= 1979–80 Rugby League Premiership =

1979–80 Premiership
- Structure: National knockout championship
- Winners: Widnes
- Runners-up: Bradford Northern

The 1979–80 Rugby League Premiership was the sixth end of season Rugby League Premiership competition.

The winners were Widnes.

== First round ==
Date	Team one	Team two	Score
26 Apr	Bradford Northern	St Helens	30-0
27 Apr	Hull F.C.	Leigh	0-8
27 Apr	Salford	Leeds	13-27
27 Apr	Widnes	Hull Kingston Rovers	20-10

== Semi-finals ==
Date	Team one	Team two	Score
6 May	Leeds	Widnes	14-4
7 May	Leigh	Bradford Northern	12-14
11 May	Bradford Northern	Leigh	17-4
11 May	Widnes	Leeds	14-3

== Final ==
17 May 1980

Widnes	19-5	Bradford Northern
T-Wright, Aspey, Bentley, Elwell, Gorley; G-Burke; DG-Eckersley, Elwell		T-Redfearn; DG-Mumby

Station Road, Swinton
Attendance: 10,215

1	Mick Burke
2	Stuart Wright
3	Mick George
4	Mal Aspey
5	Keith Bentley
6	David Eckersley
7	Reg Bowden
8	Glyn Shaw
9	Keith Elwell
10	Mike O'Neill
11	Les Gorley
12	David Hull
13	Mick Adams
Substitutions:
14	Brian Hogan for David Hull
15	unused
Coach:
Doug Laughton

1	Keith Mumby
2	Ian MacLean/Ian McLean
3	David Redfearn
4	Derek Parker
5	Leslie "Les" Gant
6	Nigel Stephenson
7	Alan Redfearn
8	Jimmy Thompson
9	John Keith Bridges
10	Colin Forsyth
11	Geoffrey Clarkson
12	Jeff Grayshon
13	Gary Hale
Substitutions:
14	Stephen/Steven "Steve" Ferres for Ian MacLean/Ian McLean
15	Gary Van Bellen for Geoffrey Clarkson
Coach:
Peter Fox
