= Bill Pattinson (rugby league, born 1954) =

England international rugby league footballer

Personal information
- Full name: William Pattinson
- Born: 8 July 1954 (age 72) Cockermouth, England

Playing information
- Position: Second-row, Loose forward
Club
Years	Team	Pld	T	G	FG	P
1975–87	Workington Town	322	67	0	0
Representative
Years	Team	Pld	T	G	FG	P
1980–86	Cumbria	6	2	0	0
1981	England	1+1	0	0	0	0
- Relatives: Bobby Pattinson (twin-brother); Bill Pattinson (uncle)

William Pattinson (born 8 July 1954), also known as Billy Pattinson, is an English former professional rugby league footballer who played in the 1970s and 1980s. He played at representative level for the British Amateur Rugby League Association Great Britain Lions, England and Cumbria, and at club level for Broughton Moor ARLFC, Cockermouth ARLFC, and Workington Town, as a second-row or loose forward.

== Playing career ==
Billy Pattinson's birth was registered in Cockermouth, Cumberland, England.

=== Club career ===
Billy Pattinson made his début for Workington Town in the 2–2 draw with Rochdale Hornets at Athletic Grounds, Rochdale on Sunday 5 October 1975, and Workington Town were promoted to First Division at the end of the 1975–76 season, and he played his last match for Workington Town in the 8–7 victory over Mansfield Marksman at North Street, Alfreton on Sunday 29 March 1987.

Billy Pattinson played loose forward (replaced by substitute Peter Gorley) in Workington Town's 11–16 defeat by Widnes in the 1976 Lancashire Cup Final during the 1976–77 season at Central Park, Wigan on Saturday 30 October 1976, played loose forward in the 13–10 victory over Wigan in the 1977 Lancashire Cup Final during the 1977–78 season at Wilderspool Stadium, Warrington on Saturday 29 October 1977, played loose forward (replaced by substitute Les Gorley) in the 13–15 defeat by Widnes in the 1978 Lancashire Cup Final during the 1978–79 season at Central Park, Wigan on Saturday 7 October 1978, and played at second-row in the 0–11 defeat by Widnes in the 1979 Lancashire Cup Final during the 1979–80 season at The Willows, Salford on Saturday 8 December 1979.

Billy Pattinson's benefit season/testimonial match at Workington Town took place during 1986.

=== Representative honours ===
Billy Pattinson won a cap for the British Amateur Rugby League Association Great Britain Lions in the 10–4 victory over France at Stade Georges-Lyvet, Lyon, France on Sunday 9 March 1975, and he won 2-caps for England while at Workington Town in 1981 against France (interchange/substitute), and Wales.

Billy Pattinson won 6-caps for Cumbria while at Workington, he made his début for Cumbria in the 9–3 victory over New Zealand at Recreation Ground, Whitehaven on Wednesday 8 October 1980.

== Genealogical information ==
Billy Pattinson is the younger brother of the rugby league footballer who played in the 1970s for Blackpool Borough (37-appearances, including the 15–25 defeat by Castleford in the Player's No.6 Trophy League Cup Final at The Willows, Salford on Saturday 22 January 1977) and Workington Town (1-appearance); Malcolm Pattinson, the younger brother of the rugby league footballer who played in the 1970s for Workington Town (12-appearances); Stanley "Stan" Pattinson, the twin brother of the rugby league footballer who played in the 1970s and 1980s for Workington Town (112-appearances from 1979 to 1985); Bobby Pattinson, and the older brother of Harold Pattinson, he is also the nephew of the rugby league footballer; Bill Pattinson.

== Note ==
Billy Pattinson's number of appearances for Workington Town is stated as being 322-appearances in the Workington Town Hall of Fame reference, but 321-appearances in the Cumberland Rugby League-100 Greats reference.
