= 1980–81 Fulham RLFC season =

- 1980–81 RFL season Rank: 3rd
- Challenge Cup: First Round
- 1980-81 record: Wins: 20; draws: 0; losses: 8
- Points scored: For: 447; against: 237

Team information
- Chairman: Ernie Clay
- Player Coach: Reg Bowden
- Captain: Reg Bowden
- Stadium: Craven Cottage
- Avg. attendance: 7345
- High attendance: 15,013 vs. Leeds

Top scorers
- Tries: Mal Aspey - 16
- Goals: Iain MacCorquodale - 75
- Points: Iain MacCorquodale - 171
Home colours	Away colours
← None	List of seasons	1981-82 →

The 1980-81 Fulham RLFC season was the first in the club's history. They entered into the 1980–81 Second Division of the Rugby Football League. They also competed in the 1980–81 Challenge Cup and the 1980–81 League Cup. They finished the season in 3rd place and were promoted to the top tier of professional rugby league in the UK.

== Birth of Fulham RLFC ==
In 1980, Fulham Football Club chairman Ernie Clay set up a rugby league team at Craven Cottage, with the intention of creating another income stream for the football club. Warrington director Harold Genders, who had helped to persuade Clay of the benefits of starting a rugby league club in the capital, resigned from the Warrington board to become managing director of Fulham R.L.F.C. The Rugby Football League (RFL), keen to encourage the expansion of the sport beyond its traditional Northern heartland, accepted the new club with 26 clubs voting in favour, with three abstentions at the League's AGM.

One of the game's leading players, Reg Bowden, was recruited by Genders to act as player-coach. He cost the club £25,000 at a time when the world record transfer fee was £40,000.

The club's first signing was Roy Lester on a free transfer from Warrington. Within nine weeks, Genders and Bowden had assembled a team of experienced players approaching retirement, together with a few promising youngsters.

Nearly 10,000 Londoners turned up for the opening game at Craven Cottage to see the newly formed side convincingly beat highly regarded Wigan 24–5. The new Fulham RL team quickly proved to be very competitive and went on to win promotion at the end of their inaugural season.

== Second Division League Table ==
	Club	P	W	D	L	PF	PA	Pts
1	York	28	23	0	5	649	331	46
2	Wigan	28	20	3	5	597	293	43
3	Fulham	28	20	0	8	447	237	40
4	Whitehaven	28	19	1	8	409	250	39
5	Huddersfield	28	18	1	9	429	310	37
6	Swinton	28	18	1	9	440	302	36
7	Keighley	28	14	1	13	445	501	29
8	Hunslet	28	13	1	14	447	430	27
9	Bramley	28	13	1	14	433	418	27
10	Rochdale Hornets	28	13	0	15	406	418	26
11	Batley	28	12	0	16	386	432	24
12	Dewsbury	28	11	1	16	346	364	23
13	Doncaster	28	5	0	23	250	562	10
14	Blackpool Borough	28	4	1	23	212	419	9
15	Huyton	28	2	0	26	211	796	4

Champions	Play-offs	Promoted	Relegated

== Players ==
Name	Appearances	Substitute	Total Appearances	Tries	Goals	Drop Goals	Points
Dave Allen	23	2	25	4	0	0	12
Mal Aspey	23	4	27	16	0	0	48
Harry Beverley	22	0	22	2	0	0	6
Reg Bowden	28	1	29	4	0	0	12
Adrian Cambriani	26	0	26	13	0	0	39
Joe Doherty	5	1	6	0	0	0	0
David Eckersley	25	2	27	12	5	10	56
Chris Ganley	19	0	19	8	0	0	24
Tony Gourley	21	3	24	1	0	0	3
Martin Herdman	7	6	13	2	0	0	6
David Hull	25	1	26	2	0	0	6
Tony Karalius	20	2	22	2	0	0	6
Roy Lester	15	8	23	3	0	0	9
Iain MacCorquodale	28	0	28	6	75	3	171
Graham Moss	2	0	2	0	0	0	0
Derek Noonan	18	0	18	4	0	0	12
Carl Radbone	9	0	9	2	3	0	12
John Risman	18	4	22	3	0	0	9
Peter Souto	4	7	11	1	0	0	3
Neil Tuffs	7	7	14	3	0	0	9
Ian van Bellen	20	3	23	4	0	0	12
John Wood	23	2	25	4	0	0	12
Graham Worgan	2	0	2	0	0	0	0

== Results ==
Date	Competition	Opposition	Venue	Result	Score	Attendance
14.09.1980	Second Division	Wigan	Home	Win	24-5	9554
21.09.1980	Second Division	Keighley	Away	Loss	24-13	3027
28.09.1980	Second Division	Swinton	Home	Win	25-11	5589
05.10.1980	Second Division	Blackpool	Away	Win	2-15	906
12.10.1980	Second Division	Huddersfield	Home	Win	30-7	5971
19.10.1980	Second Division	Doncaster	Away	Win	16-28	672
26.10.1980	Second Division	York	Home	Win	23-5	7159
09.11.1980	Second Division	Bramley	Home	Win	10-7	5405
16.11.1980	Second Division	Dewsbury	Away	Win	7-9	2500
23.11.1980	John Player Trophy Round 1	Leeds	Home	Win	9-3	12,583
30.11.1980	Second Division	Wigan	Away	Loss	15-2	8100
07.12.1980	John Player Trophy Round 2	Leigh	Away	Loss	17-9	7606
21.12.1980	Second Division	Hunslet	Home	Win	19-5	5629
28.12.1980	Second Division	Batley	Home	Win	15-5	6237
04.01.1981	Second Division	Whitehaven	Away	Loss	6-0	4235
11.01.1981	Second Division	Rochdale	Home	Loss	8-24	6162
18.01.1981	Second Division	Bramley	Away	Win	11-21	1750
25.01.1981	Second Division	Huyton	Home	Win	25-4	5805
01.02.1981	Second Division	Hunslet	Away	Win	11-12	1842
08.02.1981	Second Division	Swinton	Away	Loss	13-9	3550
15.02.1981	Challenge Cup round 1	Wakefield Trinity	Home	Loss	5-9	15,013
01.03.1981	Second Division	Blackpool	Home	Win	8-0	4715
08.03.1981	Second Division	Keighley	Home	Win	24-3	5285
15.03.1981	Second Division	Huyton	Away	Win	3-19	500
22.03.1981	Second Division	Dewsbury	Home	Win	16-4	5258
29.03.1981	Second Division	York	Away	Loss	15-10	7351
05.04.1981	Second Division	Whitehaven	Home	Win	15-0	6707
12.04.1981	Second Division	Batley	Away	Loss	10-8	3250
16.04.1981	Second Division	Rochdale	Away	Win	5-19	2750
19.04.1981	Second Division	Huddersfield	Away	Loss	8-3	2435
20.04.1981	Second Division	Doncaster	Home	Win	37-11	5867
01.05.1981	Challenge	Bradford	Home	Win	20-8	11,926
