= 1979–80 John Player Trophy =

- Structure: National knockout championship
- Teams: 32
- Winners: Bradford Northern
- Runners-up: Widnes

This was the ninth season for the League Cup, known as the John Player Trophy for sponsorship reasons.

Bradford Northern won the trophy, beating Widnes 6–0 in the final. The match was played at Headingley, Leeds, West Yorkshire. The attendance was 9,909 and receipts were £11560.

== Background ==
The council of the Rugby Football League voted to introduce a new competition, to be similar to The Football Association and Scottish Football Association's "League Cup". It was to be a similar knock-out structure to, and to be secondary to, the Challenge Cup. As this was being formulated, sports sponsorship was becoming more prevalent and as a result John Player and Sons, a division of Imperial Tobacco Company, became sponsors, and the competition never became widely known as the "League Cup."

The competition ran from 1971–72 until 1995–96 and was initially intended for the professional clubs plus the two amateur BARLA National Cup finalists. In later seasons the entries were expanded to take in other amateur and French teams. The competition was dropped due to "fixture congestion" when Rugby League became a summer sport The Rugby League season always (until the onset of "Summer Rugby" in 1996) ran from around August-time through to around May-time and this competition always took place early in the season, in the Autumn, with the final usually taking place in late January.

The competition was known by its sponsorship name, as the Player's No.6 Trophy (1971–1977), the John Player Trophy (1977–1983), the John Player Special Trophy (1983–1989), and the Regal Trophy in 1989.

The 1979–80 season saw no changes in the entrants, no new members and no withdrawals, the number remaining at eighteen. There were no drawn matches in the competition.

== Competition and results ==
=== Round 1 – First Round ===
Involved 16 matches and 32 clubs

Game No	Fixture date	Home team	Score	Away team	Venue	Att	Rec	Notes	Ref
	Fri 14 Sep 1979	Salford	47–5	Huddersfield	The Willows				
	Sat 15 Sep 1979	Wakefield Trinity	25–18	Hull F.C.	Belle Vue				
	Sun 16 Sep 1979	Barrow	13–18	St. Helens	Craven Park	4818			
	Sun 16 Sep 1979	Batley	2–12	York	Mount Pleasant				
	Sun 16 Sep 1979	Blackpool Borough	6–3	West Hull	Borough Park	555		1	
	Sun 16 Sep 1979	Bramley	43–15	Whitehaven	McLaren Field				
	Sun 16 Sep 1979	Castleford	15–12	Dewsbury	Wheldon Road				
	Sun 16 Sep 1979	Doncaster	0–48	Bradford Northern	Bentley Road Stadium/Tattersfield				
	Sun 16 Sep 1979	Featherstone Rovers	17–7	Halifax	Post Office Road				
	Sun 16 Sep 1979	Warrington	25–9	Huyton	Wilderspool			2	
	Sun 16 Sep 1979	Keighley	21–9	Rochdale Hornets	Lawkholme Lane				
	Sun 16 Sep 1979	Leigh	16–0	Hull Kingston Rovers	Hilton Park				
	Sun 16 Sep 1979	Oldham	7–31	Leeds	Watersheddings				
	Sun 16 Sep 1979	Pilkington Recs	9–18	Wigan	Knowsley Road	6707		3, 4	
	Sun 16 Sep 1979	Swinton	11-30	Workington Town	Station Road				
	Sun 16 Sep 1979	Widnes	17-11	Hunslet	Naughton Park				

=== Round 2 – Second Round ===
Involved 8 matches and 16 clubs

Game No	Fixture date	Home team	Score	Away team	Venue	Att	Rec	Notes	Ref
	Sat 29 Sep 1979	Castleford	24–10	Wigan	Wheldon Road			5	
	Sun 30 Sep 1979	Keighley	9–15	Bradford Northern	Lawkholme Lane				
	Sun 30 Sep 1979	Leeds	7–14	Leigh	Headingley				
	Sun 30 Sep 1979	Salford	23–9	Bramley	The Willows				
	Sun 30 Sep 1979	Wakefield Trinity	21–12	Featherstone Rovers	Belle Vue				
	Sun 30 Sep 1979	Warrington	20–15	York	Wilderspool				
	Sun 30 Sep 1979	Widnes	31–20	St. Helens	Naughton Park	9296			
	Sun 30 Sep 1979	Workington Town	43–7	Blackpool Borough	Derwent Park				

=== Round 3 -Quarter-finals ===
Involved 4 matches with 8 clubs

Game No	Fixture date	Home team	Score	Away team	Venue	Att	Rec	Notes	Ref
	Sat 20 Oct 1979	Warrington	6–14	Widnes	Wilderspool			6	
	Sun 21 Oct 1979	Bradford Northern	25–11	Leigh	Odsal				
	Sun 21 Oct 1979	Castleford	6–13	Salford	Wheldon Road				
	Sun 21 Oct 1979	Wakefield Trinity	26–5	Workington Town	Belle Vue				

=== Round 4 – Semi-finals ===
Involved 2 matches and 4 clubs

Game No	Fixture date	Home team	Score	Away team	Venue	Att	Rec	Notes	Ref
	Sat 3 Nov 1979	Widnes	19–3	Salford	Wilderspool	6567		7	
	Sat 17 Nov 1979	Bradford Northern	16–3	Wakefield Trinity	Headingley	8233			

=== Final ===
The final was originally scheduled to take place on 1 December 1979, but was postponed because of a BBC TV dispute. The game was rescheduled, but due to a frozen pitch at the original venue, Station Road, Swinton, the fixture was moved to Headingley in Leeds.

Fixture date	Home team	Score	Away team	Venue	Att	Rec	Notes	Ref
Saturday 5 January 1980	Bradford Northern	6–0	Widnes	Headingley	9909	11560	8	

==== Teams and scorers ====
Bradford Northern	No.	Widnes
	teams	
Keith Mumby	1	David Eckersley
"Dave" Barends	2	Stuart Wright
David Redfearn	3	Mal Aspey
Derek Parker	4	Mick George
Les Gant	5	Mick Burke
Nigel Stephenson	6	Eric Hughes
Alan Redfearn	7	Reg Bowden
James "Jimmy" Thompson	8	Brian Hogan
"Keith" Bridges	9	Keith Elwell
Colin Forsyth	10	Glyndwr "Glyn" Shaw
Jeff Grayshon	11	Les Gorley
Gary Van Bellen	12	David Hull
Len Casey	13	Mick Adams
Steve Ferres (for Gary Van Bellen)	14	? Not used
Ian Van Bellen (for Colin Forsyth)	15	Jim Mills (for Brian Hogan)
	Coach	
6	score	0
5	HT	0
	Scorers	
	Tries	
D. Parker (1)	T	
	Goals	
Keith Mumby (1)	G	
	Drop Goals	
Nigel Stephenson (1)	DG	
Referee		William "Billy" H. Thompson (Huddersfield)
Man of the match		Len Casey – Bradford Northern – loose forward
Competition Sponsor		John Player

Scoring – Try = three points – Goal = two points – Drop goal = one point

=== Prize money ===
As part of the sponsorship deal and funds, the prize money awarded to the competing teams for this season was as follows:

Finish Position	Cash prize	No. receiving prize	Total cash
Winner	£8,500	1	£8,500
Runner-up	£4,000	1	£4,000
Semi-finalist	£2,000	2	£4,000
Loser in Rd 3	£1,000	4	£4,000
Loser in Rd 2	£800	8	£6,400
Loser in Rd 1	£600	16	£9,600
Grand Total			£36,500

=== The road to success ===
This tree excludes any preliminary round fixtures

First round
Keighley	21
Rochdale Hornets	9
Doncaster	0
Bradford Northern	48
Oldham	7
Leeds	31
Leigh	16
Hull Kingston Rovers	0
Wakefield Trinity	25
Hull F.C.	18
Featherstone Rovers	17
Halifax	7
Swinton	11
Workington Town	30
Blackpool Borough	6
West Hull	3
Warrington	25
Huyton	9
Batley	2
York	12
Widnes	17
Hunslet	11
Barrow	13
St. Helens	18
Castleford	15
Dewsbury	12
Pilkington Recs	9
Wigan	18
Salford	47
Huddersfield	5
Bramley	43
Whitehaven	15

Second round
Keighley	9
Bradford Northern	15
Leeds	7
Leigh	14
Wakefield Trinity	21
Featherstone Rovers	12
Workington Town	43
Blackpool Borough	7
Warrington	21
York	15
Widnes	31
St. Helens	20
Castleford	24
Wigan	10
Salford	23
Bramley	9

Third round
Bradford Northern	25
Leigh	11
Wakefield Trinity	26
Workington Town	5
Warrington	6
Widnes	14
Castleford	6
Salford	13

Semi-finals
Bradford Northern	16
Wakefield Trinity	3
Widnes	19
Salford	3

Final
Bradford Northern	6
Widnes	0

== Notes and comments ==
1 * West Hull are a Junior (amateur) club from Hull
2 * Warrington official website and Wigan official archives shows the match played at Wilderspool but RUGBYLEAGUEproject shows Huyton at home
3 * Pilkington Recs are a Junior (amateur) club from St Helens, home ground was City Road until they moved to Ruskin Drive from 2011–12
4 * Wigan official archives give the attendance as 6,500 but RUGBYLEAGUEproject gives it as 6,707
5 * Wigan official archives gives the score as 21–10, but RUGBYLEAGUEproject gives it as 24–10
6 * Warrington official website shows the match played on 2 October but RUGBYLEAGUEproject and Wigan official archives show it played on 20 October
7 * Wigan official archives show Salford at home, but RUGBYLEAGUEproject show Widnes at home
8 * Headingley, Leeds, is the home ground of Leeds RLFC with a capacity of 21,000. The record attendance was 40,175 for a league match between Leeds and Bradford Northern on 21 May 1947.

== See also ==
- 1979–80 Northern Rugby Football League season
- 1979 Lancashire Cup
- 1979 Yorkshire Cup
- John Player Trophy
- Rugby league county cups
