= 1978–79 Challenge Cup =

Rugby league competition

1978–79 State Express Challenge Cup
- Duration: 5 Rounds
- Number of teams: 32
- Highest attendance: 94,218
- Broadcast partners: BBC
- Winners: Widnes
- Runners-up: Wakefield Trinity
- Lance Todd Trophy: David Topliss

The 1978–79 Challenge Cup was the 78th staging of rugby league's oldest knockout competition, the Challenge Cup. Known as the State Express Challenge Cup due to sponsorship by State Express 555, the final was contested by Widnes and Wakefield Trinity at Wembley. Widnes won the match 12–3.

Widnes beat Wakefield Trinity 12–3 at Wembley in front of a crowd of 94,218.

This was Widnes' fifth cup final win in seven Final appearances. To date, this was Wakefield Trinity's last appearance in a Challenge Cup final.

Despite being on the losing side, the Wakefield Trinity Stand-off, David Topliss, won the Lance Todd Trophy.

== First round ==
Date	Team one	Team two	Score
10 Feb	Hull FC	Leeds	17-6
11 Feb	Barrow	York	10-7
11 Feb	Hull Kingston Rovers	New Hunslet	23-15
11 Feb	Leigh Miners W.	Leigh	10-23
11 Feb	St Helens	Doncaster	34-9
11 Feb	Salford	Bramley	6-6
11 Feb	Warrington	Castleford	9-15
11 Feb	Widnes	Workington Town	12-5
20 Feb	Swinton	Bradford Northern	2-8
20 Feb	Wigan	Halifax	9-6
21 Feb	Huyton	Keighley	2-14
25 Feb	Dewsbury	Blackpool	13-6
25 Feb	Rochdale Hornets	Batley	15-0
25 Feb	Wakefield Trinity	Featherstone Rovers	10-7
27 Feb - replay	Bramley	Salford	2-2
28 Feb	Oldham	Ace Amateurs	23-5
01 Mar	Huddersfield	Whitehaven	11-9
01 Mar - 2nd replay	Salford	Bramley	5-7

== Second round ==
Date	Team one	Team two	Score
24 Feb	Widnes	Wigan	21-5
25 Feb	Barrow	Leigh	25-2
25 Feb	Keighley	Hull FC	12-33
04 Mar	Bradford Northern	Hull Kingston Rovers	14-7
04 Mar	Castleford	Dewsbury	31-15
04 Mar	Huddersfield	Bramley	31-12
04 Mar	Oldham	Wakefield Trinity	7-19
04 Mar	Rochdale Hornets	St Helens	10-11

== Quarter-finals ==
Date	Team one	Team two	Score
10 Mar	Castleford	St Helens	6-10
11 Mar	Bradford Northern	Hull FC	8-8
11 Mar	Huddersfield	Widnes	0-14
11 Mar	Wakefield Trinity	Barrow	8-5
14 Mar - replay	Hull FC	Bradford Northern	4-8

== Semi-finals ==
Date	Team one	Team two	Score
31 Mar	Widnes	Bradford Northern	14-11
07 Apr	Wakefield Trinity	St Helens	9-7

== Final ==
5 May 1979

Widnes	12 – 3	Wakefield Trinity
Try: Wright, Hughes; Goal: Burke (2); Drop goal: Elwell, Eckersley	Report	Try: Fletcher

Wembley, London
Attendance: 94,218
Referee: J. E. Jackson (Pudsey)
Player of the Match: David Topliss

FB	1	David Eckersley
RW	2	Stuart Wright
RC	3	Mal Aspey
LC	4	Mick George	(substituted off) 58'
LW	5	Mick Burke
SO	6	Eric Hughes
SH	7	Reg Bowden (c)
PR	8	Jim Mills
HK	9	Keith Elwell
PR	10	Glyn Shaw
SR	11	Mick Adams
SR	12	Alan Dearden	(substituted off) 74'
LF	13	Doug Laughton
Substitutions:
IC	14	Mike O'Neill	(substituted on) 74'
IC	15	David Hull	(substituted on) 58'
Player-coach:
Doug Laughton

FB	1	Les Sheard
RW	2	Andy Fletcher
RC	3	Keith Smith
LC	4	Steve Diamond
LW	5	Brian Juliff
SO	6	David Topliss (c)
SH	7	Mike Lampkowski
PR	8	John Burke
HK	9	Alan McCurrie
PR	10	Trevor Skerrett
SR	11	Bill Ashurst
SR	12	Keith Rayne
LF	13	Graham Idle
Substitutions:
IC	14	Trevor Midgley
IC	15	Kevin Rayne
Coach:
Bill Kirkbride
