= 1978–79 BBC2 Floodlit Trophy =

14th staging of the BBC2 Floodlit Trophy competition

- Structure: Floodlit knockout championship
- Teams: 22
- Winners: Widnes
- Runners-up: St. Helens

The 1978–79 BBC2 Floodlit Trophy was the 14th staging of the BBC2 Floodlit Trophy competition, and was held in 1978.

Previous two times runner-up Widnes won the trophy by beating the previous year's winners and cup holders St. Helens by 13-7. The match was played at Knowsley Road, Eccleston, St Helens, Merseyside. 10,250 fans attended, and the receipts were £7,017.

== Background ==
This season Batley dropped out after only one season, but Bramley returned; thus the number of entrants remaining the same at twenty-two.
The format remained as a knock-out competition from the preliminary round through to the final.
The preliminary round involved twelve clubs, to reduce the numbers taking part in the competition proper to just sixteen.

== Competition and results ==
=== Preliminary round ===
Involved 6 matches and 12 clubs

Game No	Fixture date	Home team	Score	Away team	Venue	Att	Rec	Notes	Ref
P	Sat 26 Aug 1978	Leeds	47–11	Bramley	Headingley	10099		1 2	
P	Sun 27 Aug 1978	Barrow	17–11	Oldham	Craven Park				
P	Sun 27 Aug 1978	Wigan	27–10	Swinton	Central Park				
P	Tue 5 Sep 1978	Hull Kingston Rovers	39–2	New Hunslet	Craven Park (1)				
P	Tue 5 Sep 1978	Keighley	10–0	Dewsbury	Lawkholme Lane				
P	Tue 12 Sep 1978	St. Helens	13–9	Warrington	Knowsley Road	5,000			

=== First round ===
Involved 8 matches and 16 clubs

Game No	Fixture date	Home team	Score	Away team	Venue	Att	Rec	Notes	Ref
1	Tue 26 Sep 1978	Castleford	20–11	Wakefield Trinity	Wheldon Road			3	
2	Thu 28 Sep 1978	Barrow	17–5	Leigh	Craven Park				
3	Tue 3 Oct 1978	Halifax	12–21	Hull Kingston Rovers	Thrum Hall			3	
4	Tue 3 Oct 1978	Keighley	15–25	Huddersfield	Lawkholme Lane				
5	Tue 3 Oct 1978	Widnes	17–13	Whitehaven	Naughton Park				
6	Tue 10 Oct 1978	Leeds	8–14	Hull F.C.	Headingley				
7	Tue 17 Oct 1978	Salford	15–17	St. Helens	The Willows	4,632		3	
8	Tue 24 Oct 1978	Wigan	13–2	Rochdale Hornets	Central Park			3 (Note: Rochdale Hornets progressed to the next round after Wigan were expelled from the competition for fielding an ineligible player.)	

=== Second round ===
Involved 4 matches with 8 clubs

Game No	Fixture date	Home team	Score	Away team	Venue	Att	Rec	Notes	Ref
1	Tue 31 Oct 1978	Barrow	0–6	Hull F.C.	Craven Park				
2	Tue 7 Nov 1978	St. Helens	47–5	Castleford	Knowsley Road	4,247		5	
3	Wed 15 Nov 1978	Rochdale Hornets	10–9	Huddersfield	Athletic Grounds				
4	Tue 21 Nov 1978	Hull Kingston Rovers	P	Widnes	Craven Park (1)			6	

=== Replay ===
Involved 1 matches and 2 clubs

Game No	Fixture date	Home team	Score	Away team	Venue	Att	Rec	Notes	Ref
R	Tue 21 Nov 1978	Hull Kingston Rovers	10–13	Widnes	Craven Park (1)				

=== Semi-finals ===
Involved 2 matches and 4 clubs

Game No	Fixture date	Home team	Score	Away team	Venue	Att	Rec	Notes	Ref
1	Tue 28 Nov 1978	Hull F.C.	5–13	St Helens	Boulevard	8,428		3	
2	Tue 05 Dec 1978	Rochdale Hornets	P	Widnes	Athletic Grounds			7	

=== Replay ===
Involved 2 matches and 4 clubs

Game No	Fixture date	Home team	Score	Away team	Venue	Att	Rec	Notes	Ref
R	Fri 08 Dec 1978	Rochdale Hornets	9–26	Widnes	Athletic Grounds				

=== Final ===
Game No	Fixture date	Home team	Score	Away team	Venue	Att	Rec	Notes	Ref
F	Tuesday 12 December 1978	St Helens	7–13	Widnes	Knowsley Road	10,250	7,017	3 8 9	

==== Teams and scorers ====
Widnes	№	St. Helens
	teams	
David Eckersley	1	Geoff Pimblett
Stuart Wright	2	Les Jones
Eric Hughes	3	Peter Glynn
Mal Aspey	4	Eddie Cunningham
Peter Shaw	5	Roy Mathias
Mick Burke	6	Bill Francis
Reg Bowden	7	Neil Holding
Brian Hogan	8	Dave Chisnall
Keith Elwell	9	Graham Liptrot
Jim Mills	10	Mel James
Mick Adams	11	George Nicholls
Alan Dearden	12	John Knighton
Doug Laughton	13	Harry Pinner
Doug Laughton	Coach	Eric Ashton
13	score	7
8	HT	5
	Scorers	
	Tries	
Stuart Wright (2)	T	David "Dave" Chisnall (1)
Mick Burke (1)	T	
	Goals	
Mick Burke (2)	G	Geoff Pimblett (2)
Referee		J McDonald (Wigan)

Scoring - Try = three (3) points - Goal = two (2) points - Drop goal = two (2) points

=== The road to success ===
This tree excludes any preliminary round fixtures

First round
Barrow	17
Leigh	5
Leeds	8
Hull F.C.	14
Salford	15
St. Helens	17
Castleford	20
Wakefield Trinity	11
Wigan	13
Rochdale Hornets	2
Keighley	15
Huddersfield	25
Halifax	12
Hull Kingston Rovers	21
Widnes	17
Whitehaven	13

Second round
Barrow	0
Hull F.C.	6
St. Helens	47
Castleford	5
Rochdale Hornets	10
Huddersfield	9
Hull Kingston Rovers	10
Widnes	13

Semi-finals
Hull F.C.	5
St. Helens	13
Rochdale Hornets	9
Widnes	26

Final
St. Helens	7
Widnes	13

== Notes ==
1 * At the time this was the second highest score, only to be equalled about two months later in the Second round
2 * The RUGBYLEAGUEprojects gives the attendance as 10,099 but this appears to be the attendance at the previous year's final added in error
3 * This match was televised
5 * At the time this equalled the second highest score
6 * Postponed due to pending court case brought by Wigan against the RFL
7 * Postponed
8 * The Rothmans Rugby League Yearbook 1990–1991 and 1991-92 and the RUGBYLEAGUEprojects gives the attendance as 10,250 but the official St. Helens archives give it as 10,500
9 * Knowsley Road was the home of St Helens R.F.C. from 1890 until its closure in 2010. The final capacity was 17,500 although the record attendance was 35,695 set on 26 December 1949 for a league game between St Helens and Wigan.

== See also ==
- 1978–79 Northern Rugby Football League season
- 1978 Lancashire Cup
- 1978 Yorkshire Cup
- BBC2 Floodlit Trophy
- Rugby league county cups
