= John Burke (rugby league, born 1957) =

GB international rugby league footballer

Personal information
- Full name: John Burke
- Born: 2 September 1957 (age 68) Leigh, England

Playing information
- Position: Fullback, Centre
Club
Years	Team	Pld	T	G	FG	P
1976–77	Wigan	15+3	3	44		97
1977–78	Workington Town
	Total	18	3	44	0	97
Representative
Years	Team	Pld	T	G	FG	P
1978	Great Britain	0	0	0	0	0

John Burke (born 2 September 1957) is an English former professional rugby league footballer who played in the 1970s, selected at representative level for Great Britain (non-Test matches), and at club level for Wigan and Workington Town, as a fullback or centre.

== Background ==
John Burke was born in Leigh, Lancashire, England.

== Playing career ==
=== International honours ===
John Burke played 3 matches for the England/English Schoolboys against the Australian Schoolboys, played for Great Britain (Colts), and he was selected for Great Britain while at Workington Town for the 1978 Kangaroo tour of Great Britain and France.

=== County Cup Final appearances ===
John Burke appeared as a substitute (replacing centre Steve Davies), and scored a goal in Wigan's 13-16 defeat by Workington Town in the 1977 Lancashire Cup Final during the 1977–78 season at Wilderspool Stadium, Warrington, on Saturday 29 October 1977. John is the only player to receive a winners and runners up medal for a cup final 1978/1979 Lancs cup final Workington v Widnes

=== Club career ===
John Burke was transferred from Wigan to Workington Town during February 1978, he broke his back, in an accidental ‘crusher tackle’ that caused a double dislocation of vertebrae five and six, while playing for Workington Town against Leeds on Sunday 3 September 1978. The injury left him tetraplegic. He had previously been selected for Great Britain, and in 1981 he was presented with his cap by Rugby Football League officials; Thomas Mitchell (Workington Town), and Bill Oxley (Barrow).
