= 1977–78 Lancashire Cup =

- Structure: Regional knockout championship
- Teams: 14
- Winners: Workington Town
- Runners-up: Wigan

The 1977–78 Lancashire Cup tournament was the sixty-fifth occasion on which the Lancashire Cup had been contested. For the first time in many years, there was a new name on the trophy as this time it was relative newcomers Workington Town who joined the league in 1945. Workington Town won the trophy by beating Wigan in the final by the score of 16-13. The match was played at Wilderspool, Warrington, now in the County Palatine of Chester but (historically in the county of Lancashire). The attendance was 9,548 and receipts were £5,038. After relatively little success in the competition, Workington Town had reached the semi-final stage in 1973, 1974 and 1975, had been runner-up in 1976, and now winner in 1977. They would go on to be runners-up again in 1978 and 1979.

== Background ==
The total number of teams entering the competition remained at last season’s total of 14 with no junior/amateur clubs taking part. The same fixture format was retained, but due to the number of participating clubs, this resulted in one "blank" or "dummy" fixture in the first round, and one bye in the second round.

== Competition and results ==
=== Round 1 ===
Involved 7 matches (with one "blank" fixture) and 14 clubs

Game No	Fixture date	Home team	Score	Away team	Venue	Att	Rec	Notes	Ref
1	Sun 21 Aug 1977	Blackpool Borough	6-24	Whitehaven	Borough Park				
2	Sun 21 Aug 1977	Rochdale Hornets	27-5	Barrow	Athletic Grounds				
3	Sun 21 Aug 1977	St. Helens	49-3	Swinton	Knowsley Road	3000			
4	Sun 21 Aug 1977	Warrington	19-13	Huyton	Wilderspool				
5	Sun 21 Aug 1977	Widnes	22-11	Leigh	Naughton Park				
6	Sun 21 Aug 1977	Wigan	42-5	Oldham	Central Park				
7	Sun 21 Aug 1977	Workington Town	17-12	Salford	Derwent Park				
8		blank		blank					

=== Round 2 - Quarter-finals ===
Involved 3 matches (with one bye) and 7 clubs

Game No	Fixture date	Home team	Score	Away team	Venue	Att	Rec	Notes	Ref
1	Sun 28 Aug 1977	Rochdale Hornets	4-4	St. Helens	Athletic Grounds	2485			
2	Sun 28 Aug 1977	Wigan	52-8	Whitehaven	Central Park				
3	Sun 28 Aug 1977	Workington Town	8-6	Widnes	Derwent Park				
4		Warrington		bye					

=== Round 2 - replays ===
Involved 1 match and 2 clubs

Game No	Fixture date	Home team	Score	Away team	Venue	Att	Rec	Notes	Ref
1	Tue 30 Aug 1977	St. Helens	16-5	Rochdale Hornets	Knowsley Road	3500			

=== Round 3 – Semi-finals ===
Involved 2 matches and 4 clubs

Game No	Fixture date	Home team	Score	Away team	Venue	Att	Rec	Notes	Ref
1	Wed 21 Sep 1977	Workington Town	5-4	St. Helens	Derwent Park	5110			
2	Wed 28 Sep 1977	Wigan	17-8	Warrington	Central Park				

=== Round 3 – Semi-finals - replays ===
Involved 1 match and 2 clubs

Game No	Fixture date	Home team	Score	Away team	Venue	Att	Rec	Notes	Ref
1	Wed 29 Sep 1977	Workington Town	26-15	Warrington	Derwent Park				

=== Final ===
Game No	Fixture date	Home team	Score	Away team	Venue	Att	Rec	Notes	Ref
	Saturday 29 October 1977	Workington Town	16-13	Wigan	Wilderspool	9,548	5,038	1	

==== Teams and scorers ====
Workington Town	№	Wigan
	teams	
Paul Charlton	1	Malcolm Swann
David Collister	2	Green Vigo
John Risman	3	David Willicombe
Ian Wright	4	Steve Davies
Iain McCorquodale	5	Jimmy Hornby
Ray Wilkins	6	Alan Taylor
Arnold "Boxer" Walker	7	Jimmy Nulty
Derek Watts	8	Brian Hogan
Alan Banks	9	Geoff Aspinall
Eddie Bowman	10	Robert Irving
Les Gorley	11	Bill Ashurst
Peter Gorley	12	Bill Melling
William Pattinson	13	Bob Blackwood
David Atkinson (for Paul Charlton 62min)	14	John Burke (for Steve Davies 59min)
Ian Hartley	15	David Regan (for Bill Melling 59min)
16	score	13
9	HT	8
	Scorers	
	Tries	
Ian Wright (1)	T	Jimmy Nulty (1)
Ray Wilkins (1)	T	Bill Ashurst (1)
	T	David Willicombe (1)
	Goals	
Iain McCorquodale (4)	G	Jimmy Nulty (1)
	G	John Burke (1)
	Drop Goals	
Arnold "Boxer" Walker (2)	DG	
Referee		W H (Billy) Thompson (Huddersfield)
Man of the match		Arnold "Boxer" Walker - Workington Town - scrum-half
sponsored by		Rugby Leaguer
Competition Sponsor		Forshaws (Burtonwood Brewery Co Ltd)

Scoring - Try = three points - Goal = two points - Drop goal = one point

=== The road to success ===
First round
Workington Town	17
Salford	12
Widnes	22
Leigh	11
Rochdale Hornets	27
Barrow	5
St. Helens	49
Swinton	3
Wigan	42
Oldham	5
Blackpool Borough	6
Whitehaven	24
Warrington	19
Huyton	13
blank
blank

Second round
Workington Town	8
Widnes	6
Rochdale Hornets	4-5
St. Helens	4-16
Wigan	52
Whitehaven	8
Warrington
bye

Semi-finals
Workington Town	5
St. Helens	4
Wigan	17
Warrington	8

Final
Workington Town	16
Wigan	13

== Notes ==
1 * Wilderspool was the home ground of Warrington from 1883 to the end of the 2003 Summer season when they moved into the new purpose built Halliwell Jones Stadium. Wilderspool remained as a sports/Ruugby League ground and is/was used by Woolston Rovers/Warrington Wizards junior club.

The ground had a final capacity of 9,000 although the record attendance was set in a Challenge cup third round match on 13 March 1948 when 34,304 spectators saw Warrington lose to Wigan 10-13.

== See also ==
- 1977–78 Northern Rugby Football League season
- Rugby league county cups
