= 1974–75 Lancashire Cup =

Sixty-second occasion

- Structure: Regional knockout championship
- Teams: 14
- Winners: Widnes
- Runners-up: Salford

The 1974–75 Lancashire Cup was the 62nd occasion on which the Lancashire Cup competition had been held. Widnes won the trophy by beating Salford by the score of 19-9.

== Background ==
The total number of teams entering the competition remained unchanged at 14. The same fixture format was retained, with one team receiving a bye in the second round.

== Competition and results ==
=== First round ===
Involved seven matches (with one “blank” fixture) and 14 clubs

Game No	Fixture date	Home team	Score	Away team	Venue	Att	Ref
1	Fri 30 Aug 1974	Barrow	10–31	Leigh	Craven Park	1,500	
2	Fri 30 Aug 1974	St. Helens	11–13	Workington Town	Knowsley Road	3,000	
3	Fri 30 Aug 1974	Salford	25–8	Blackpool Borough	The Willows	4,058	
4	Sun 01 Sep 1974	Huyton	22–15	Whitehaven	Alt Park, Huyton	250	
5	Sun 01 Sep 1974	Oldham	9–14	Widnes	Watersheddings	3,288	
6	Sun 01 Sep 1974	Rochdale Hornets	20–12	Warrington	Athletic Grounds		
7	Sun 01 Sep 1974	Swinton	17–15	Wigan	Station Road	3,316	

=== Second Round ===
Involved three matches and six clubs. Leigh received a bye into the next round.

Game No	Fixture date	Home team	Score	Away team	Venue	Att	Ref
1	Sun 08 Sep 1974	Salford	17–15	Huyton	The Willows	3,076	
2	Sun 08 Sep 1974	Workington Town	17–7	Swinton	Derwent Park	1,022	
3	Tue 10 Sep 1974	Rochdale Hornets	7–7	Widnes	Athletic Grounds	2,603	
Replay	Fri 13 Sep 1974	Widnes	8–7	Rochdale Hornets	Naughton Park	3,800	

=== Semi-finals ===
Involved 2 matches and 4 clubs

Game No	Fixture date	Home team	Score	Away team	Venue	Att	Ref
1	Tue 08 Oct 1974	Leigh	5–8	Widnes	Hilton Park	4,500	
2	Fri 11 Oct 1974	Salford	17–10	Workington Town	The Willows	8,498	

=== Final ===
The match was played at Central Park, Wigan. The attendance was 7,403 and receipts were £2,833.

This was the first time Widnes had won the Lancashire Cup since 1945.

2 November 1974

Widnes	6 – 2	Salford
Tries: George; Goals: Dutton; Drop goals: Hughes		Goals: Fielding

Central Park, Wigan
Attendance: 7,403
Referee: Fred Lindop (Wakefield)
Player of the Match: Mike Coulman

==== Teams ====
Widnes	№	Salford
Ray Dutton	1	Paul Charlton
Mick George	2	Keith Fielding
Dennis O'Neill	3	Colin Dixon
Mal Aspey	4	Gordon Graham
Alan Prescott	5	Maurice Richards
Eric Hughes	6	John Taylor
Reg Bowden	7	Peter Banner
Jim Mills	8	Graham Mackay
Keith Elwell	9	Ellis Devlin
John Stephens	10	Alan Grice
Mick Adams	11	John Knighton
Bob Blackwood	12	Mike Coulman
Doug Laughton	13	Eric Prescott
	Subs	
?	14	Tony Redford
?	15	Sam Turnbull

=== The road to success ===
First round
Barrow	10
Leigh	31
blank
blank
Rochdale Hornets	20
Warrington	12
Oldham	9
Widnes	14
Salford	25
Blackpool Borough	8
Huyton	22
Whitehaven	15
St. Helens	11
Workington Town	13
Swinton	17
Wigan	15

Second round
Leigh
bye
Rochdale Hornets	7-7
Widnes	7-8
Salford	17
Huyton	15
Workington Town	17
Swinton	7

Semi-finals
Leigh	5
Widnes	8
Salford	17
Workington Town	10

Final
Widnes	6
Salford	2

== See also ==
- 1974–75 Northern Rugby Football League season
- Rugby league county cups
