= 1971–72 Lancashire Cup =

- Structure: Regional knockout championship
- Teams: 14
- Winners: Wigan
- Runners-up: Widnes

The 1971–72 Lancashire Cup was the fifty-ninth occasion on which the completion had been held. Wigan won the trophy by beating Widnes by the score of 15-8 in the final. The match was played at Knowsley Road, Eccleston, St Helens, (historically in the county of Lancashire). The attendance was 6,970 and receipts were £2,204.00 (the first final after the UK went decimal)

== Background ==
The total number of teams entering the competition decreased by two down to a total of 14, due to no junior/amateur clubs taking part.
The same fixture format was retained, but due to the decrease in the number of participating clubs, resulted in one "blank" or "dummy" fixtures in the first round, and one bye in the second round.

== Competition and results ==
=== Round 1 ===
Involved 7 matches (with one "blank" fixture) and 14 clubs

| Game No | Fixture date | Home team | Score | | Away team | Venue | Att | Rec | Notes | Ref |
|---|---|---|---|---|---|---|---|---|---|---|
| 1 | Thu 05-08-1971 | Huyton | 6-16 | | Wigan | Alt Park, Huyton | | | | |
| 2 | Fri 06-08-1971 | St. Helens | 11-10 | | Leigh | Knowsley Road | 7,000 | | | |
| 3 | Fri 06-08-1971 | Warrington | 17-9 | | Whitehaven | Wilderspool | | | | |
| 4 | Fri 06-08-1971 | Widnes | 22-4 | | Blackpool Borough | Naughton Park | | | | |
| 5 | Sat 07-08-1971 | Barrow | 5-13 | | Rochdale Hornets | Craven Park | | | | |
| 6 | Sun 08-08-1971 | Salford | 46-5 | | Workington Town | The Willows | | | | |
| 7 | Sun 08-08-1971 | Swinton | 10-7 | | Oldham | Station Road | | | | |
| 8 | blank | | | blank | | | | | | |

=== Round 2 - Quarter-finals ===
Involved 3 matches (with one bye) and 7 clubs

| Game No | Fixture date | Home team | Score | Away team | Venue | Att | Rec | Notes | Ref |
|---|---|---|---|---|---|---|---|---|---|
| 1 | Thu 12-08-1971 | St. Helens | 23-6 | Warrington | Knowsley Road | 5,650 | | | |
| 2 | Sun 15-08-1971 | Swinton | 20-11 | Salford | Station Road | | | | |
| 3 | Sun 15-08-1971 | Widnes | 17-8 | Rochdale Hornets | Naughton Park | | | | |
| 4 | | Wigan | | bye | | | | | |

=== Round 3 – Semi-finals ===
Involved 2 matches and 4 clubs

| Game No | Fixture date | Home team | Score | Away team | Venue | Att | Rec | Notes | Ref |
|---|---|---|---|---|---|---|---|---|---|
| 1 | Tue 17-08-1971 | St. Helens | 10-12 | Widnes | Knowsley Road | 6,000 | | | |
| 2 | Wed 18-08-1971 | Swinton | 2-12 | Wigan | Station Road | | | | |

=== Final ===
| Game No | Fixture date | Home team | Score | Away team | Venue | Att | Rec | Notes | Ref |
|---|---|---|---|---|---|---|---|---|---|
| | Saturday 28 August 1971 | Wigan | 15-8 | Widnes | Knowsley Road | 6,970 | 2,204 | 1 | |

==== Teams and scorers ====
| Wigan | № | Widnes |
|---|---|---|
| | teams | |
| Colin Tyrer | 1 | Ray Dutton |
| Phil Eastham | 2 | Dennis Brown |
| Bill Francis | 3 | Mick McLoughlin |
| Chris Fuller | 4 | Mal Aspey |
| Stuart Wright | 5 | Johnny Gaydon |
| David Hill | 6 | Dennis O'Neill |
| Warren Ayres | 7 | Reg Bowden |
| Dennis Ashcroft | 8 | John Warlow |
| Colin Clarke | 9 | John Foran |
| Geoff Fletcher | 10 | Joe Doughty |
| Bill Ashurst | 11 | John Kirwan |
| Kevin O'Loughlin | 12 | Alan Walsh |
| Doug Laughton | 13 | George Nicholls |
| Dave Gandy (for Stuart Wright) | 14 | Ged Lowe (for Alan Walsh) |
| ? | 15 | ? |
| Eric Ashton | Coach | ? |
| 15 | score | 8 |
| 5 | HT | 3 |
| | Scorers | |
| | Tries | |
| Warren Ayres (1) | T | Dennis O'Neill (1) |
| Bill Francis (1) | T | Johnny Gaydon (1) |
| Phil Eastham (1) | T | |
| | Goals | |
| Colin Tyrer (3) | G | Mal Aspey (1) |
| Referee | | W H (Billy) Thompson (Huddersfield) |

Scoring - Try = three (3) points - Goal = two (2) points - Drop goal = two (2) points

=== The road to success ===
First round
Swinton | 10
Oldham | 7
Salford | 46
Workington Town | 5
Huyton | 6
Wigan | 16
blank
blank
St. Helens | 11
Leigh | 10
Warrington | 17
Whitehaven | 9
Widnes | 22
Blackpool Borough | 4
Barrow | 5
Rochdale Hornets | 13

Second round
Swinton | 20
Salford | 11
Wigan
bye
St. Helens | 23
Warrington | 6
Widnes | 17
Rochdale Hornets | 8

Semi-finals
Swinton | 2
Wigan | 12
St. Helens | 10
Widnes | 12

Final
Wigan | 15
Widnes | 8

== Notes and comments ==
1 * Knowsley Road was the home ground of St. Helens from 1890 to 2010. The final capacity was in the region of 18,000, although the actual record attendance was 35,695 set on 26 December 1949, for a league game between St Helens and Wigan

== See also ==
- British rugby league system
- 1971–72 Northern Rugby Football League season
- Rugby league county cups
- List of defunct rugby league clubs
