= 1976–77 Lancashire Cup =

- Structure: Regional knockout championship
- Teams: 14
- Winners: Widnes
- Runners-up: Workington Town

1976–77 was the sixty-fourth occasion on which the Lancashire Cup completion had been held.

Widnes won the trophy by beating Workington Town by the score of 16-11

The match was played at Central Park, Wigan, (historically in the county of Lancashire). The attendance was 9,399 and receipts were £6,414.00

== Background ==
The total number of teams entering the competition remained at last season’s total of 14 with no junior/amateur clubs taking part.

The same fixture format was retained, but due to the number of participating clubs, this resulted in one “blank” or “dummy” fixture in the first round, and one bye in the second round.

== Competition and results ==
=== Round 1 ===
Involved 7 matches (with one “blank” fixture) and 14 clubs

Game No	Fixture date	Home team	Score	Away team	Venue	Att	Rec	Notes	Ref
1	Sat 21 Aug 1976	Wigan	37-5	St. Helens	Central Park	2370			
2	Sun 22 Aug 1976	Barrow	7-40	Warrington	Craven Park				
3	Sun 22 Aug 1976	Blackpool Borough	17-10	Oldham	Borough Park				
4	Sun 22 Aug 1976	Leigh	41-13	Whitehaven	Hilton Park				
5	Sun 22 Aug 1976	Salford	46-14	Huyton	The Willows				
6	Sun 22 Aug 1976	Widnes	25-13	Rochdale Hornets	Naughton Park				
7	Sun 22 Aug 1976	Workington Town	15-11	Swinton	Derwent Park				
8		blank		blank					

=== Round 2 - Quarter-finals ===
Involved 3 matches (with one bye) and 7 clubs

Game No	Fixture date	Home team	Score	Away team	Venue	Att	Rec	Notes	Ref
1	Sun 29 Aug 1976	Warrington	14-13	Salford	Wilderspool				
2	Sun 29 Aug 1976	Wigan	14-16	Leigh	Central Park				
3	Sun 29 Aug 1976	Workington Town	30-8	Blackpool Borough	Derwent Park				
4		Widnes		bye					

=== Round 3 – Semi-finals ===
Involved 2 matches and 4 clubs

Game No	Fixture date	Home team	Score	Away team	Venue	Att	Rec	Notes	Ref
1	Wed 08 Sep 1976	Leigh	16-24	Widnes	Hilton Park				
2	Tue 21 Sep 1976	Warrington	9-9	Workington Town	Wilderspool				

=== Round 3 – Semi-finals - replays ===
Involved 1 match and 2 clubs

Game No	Fixture date	Home team	Score	Away team	Venue	Att	Rec	Notes	Ref
1	Wed 29 Sep 1976	Workington Town	26-15	Warrington	Derwent Park				

=== Final ===
Game No	Fixture date	Home team	Score	Away team	Venue	Att	Rec	Notes	Ref
	Saturday 30 October 1976	Widnes	16-11	Workington Town	Central Park	9,399	6,414	1 2 3	

==== Teams and scorers ====
Widnes	№	Workington Town
	teams	
Ray Dutton	1	Paul Charlton
Stuart Wright	2	David Collister
Mal Aspey	3	Ray Wilkins
Mick George	4	Ian Wright
Alan Prescott	5	Iain McCorquodale
David Eckersley	6	Brian Lauder
Reg Bowden	7	Arnold "Boxer" Walker
Bill Ramsey	8	Jim Mills
Keith Elwell	9	Alan Banks
Nick Nelson	10	Ralph Calvin
Mick Adams	11	Eddie Bowman
Alan Dearden	12	Les Gorley
Doug Laughton	13	Bill Pattinson
Paul Woods	14	Harry Marland
Barry Sheridan	15	Peter Gorley (for Bill Pattinson
16	score	11
9	HT	5
	Scorers	
	Tries	
Stuart Wright (1)	T	Ray Wilkins (1)
Mick George (1)	T	
	Goals	
Ray Dutton (4)	G	Iain McCorquodale (4)
	Drop Goals	
Ray Dutton (1)	DG	
Reg Bowden (1)	DG	
Referee		W H (Billy) Thompson (Huddersfield)
Man of the match		David Eckersley - Widnes - stand-off
sponsored by		Rugby Leaguer
Competition Sponsor		Forshaws (Burtonwood Brewery Co Ltd)

Scoring - Try = three points - Goal = two points - Drop goal = one point

=== The road to success ===
First round
Wigan	27
St. Helens	5
Leigh	41
Whitehaven	13
Widnes	25
Rochdale Hornets	13
blank
blank
Barrow	7
Warrington	40
Salford	46
Huyton	14
Workington Town	15
Swinton	11
Blackpool Borough	17
Oldham	10

Second round
Wigan	14
Leigh	16
Widnes
bye
Warrington	14
Salford	13
Workington Town	30
Blackpool Borough	8

Semi-finals
Leigh	19
Widnes	24
Warrington	9-26
Workington Town	9-15

Final
Widnes	16
Workington Town	11

== Notes and comments ==
1 * News of the World Football annual of 1976–77 has the score as 17-11 - other publications and archived records e.g. Widnes official archives have the score as 16-11

2 * Rothmans Rugby League Yearbook 1991-92 gives the attendance as 7,566 - RUGBYLEAGUEprojects give the attendance as 9,399

3 * Central Park was the home ground of Wigan with a final capacity of 18,000, although the record attendance was 47,747 for Wigan v St Helens 27 March 1959

== See also ==
- 1976–77 Northern Rugby Football League season
- Rugby league county cups
