= 1975–76 Player's No.6 Trophy =

- Structure: National knockout championship
- Teams: 32
- Winners: Widnes
- Runners-up: Hull F.C.

This was the fifth season for the League Cup, known as the Players No.6 Trophy for sponsorship reasons.

Widnes won the trophy by beating Hull F.C. by the score of 19–13 in the final played at Headingley, Leeds, West Yorkshire. The attendance was 9,035 and receipts were £6275.

== Background ==
This season saw no changes in the entrants, no new members and no withdrawals, the number remaining at eighteen.

== Competition and results ==
=== Round 1 - First round ===
Involved 16 matches and 32 clubs

Game No	Fixture date	Home team	Score	Away team	Venue	Att	Rec	Notes	Ref
1	Fri 26 Sep 1975	Castleford	26-15	York	Wheldon Road				
2	Fri 26 Sep 1975	Mayfield	3-53	Salford	The Willows	3449		1, 2, 3	
3	Sat 27 Sep 1975	Barrow	16-9	Pilkington Recs	Craven Park	612		4	
4	Sat 27 Sep 1975	Wigan	30-7	Keighley	Central Park				
5	Sat 27 Sep 1975	Workington Town	16-9	Bramley	Derwent Park				
6	Sun 28 Sep 1975	Batley	18-9	Whitehaven	Mount Pleasant				
7	Sun 28 Sep 1975	Blackpool Borough	11-36	St. Helens	Borough Park				
8	Sun 28 Sep 1975	Bradford Northern	12-32	Wakefield Trinity	Odsal				
9	Sun 28 Sep 1975	Doncaster	12-23	Hull F.C.	Bentley Road Stadium/Tattersfield				
10	Sun 28 Sep 1975	Huddersfield	20-12	Warrington	Fartown				
11	Sun 28 Sep 1975	Hull Kingston Rovers	33-10	Rochdale Hornets	Craven Park (1)				
12	Sun 28 Sep 1975	Huyton	14-20	Oldham	Alt Park, Huyton				
13	Sun 28 Sep 1975	Leigh	12-5	Featherstone Rovers	Hilton Park				
14	Sun 28 Sep 1975	New Hunslet	28-8	Halifax	Elland Road Greyhound Stadium			5	
15	Sun 28 Sep 1975	Swinton	7-23	Leeds	Station Road				
16	Sun 28 Sep 1975	Widnes	27-12	Dewsbury	Naughton Park				

=== Round 2 - Second round ===
Involved 8 matches and 16 clubs

Game No	Fixture date	Home team	Score	Away team	Venue	Att	Rec	Notes	Ref
1	Fri 7 Nov 1975	Hull Kingston Rovers	23-8	Leigh	Craven Park (1)			6	
2	Sat 8 Nov 1975	Wigan	5-18	Widnes	Central Park				
3	Sun 9 Nov 1975	Huddersfield	14-5	Barrow	Fartown				
4	Sun 9 Nov 1975	Hull F.C.	9-9	Leeds	Boulevard				
5	Sun 9 Nov 1975	St. Helens	47-9	Batley	Knowsley Road				
6	Sun 9 Nov 1975	Salford	46-3	Oldham	The Willows				
7	Sun 9 Nov 1975	Wakefield Trinity	14-24	Castleford	Belle Vue				
8	Sun 9 Nov 1975	Workington Town	23-6	New Hunslet	Derwent Park				

=== Round 2 - Second round replays ===
Involved 1 match and 2 clubs

Game No	Fixture date	Home team	Score	Away team	Venue	Att	Rec	Notes	Ref
1	Thu 13 Nov 1975	Leeds	11-23	Hull F.C.	Headingley				

=== Round 3 - quarterfinals ===
Involved 4 matches with 8 clubs

Game No	Fixture date	Home team	Score	Away team	Venue	Att	Rec	Notes	Ref
1	Sat 22 Nov 1975	Hull F.C.	9-8	St. Helens	Boulevard				
2	Sun 23 Nov 1975	Huddersfield	10-19	Castleford	Fartown				
3	Sun 23 Nov 1975	Hull Kingston Rovers	14-18	Widnes	Craven Park (1)				
4	Sun 23 Nov 1975	Salford	16-8	Workington Town	The Willows				

=== Round 4 – semifinals ===
Involved 2 matches and 4 clubs

Game No	Fixture date	Home team	Score	Away team	Venue	Att	Rec	Notes	Ref
1	Sat 29 Nov 1975	Castleford	9-17	Widnes	Wheldon Road				
2	Sat 13 Dec 1975	Salford	14-22	Hull F.C.	The Willows				

=== Final ===
Game No	Fixture date	Home team	Score	Away team	Venue	Att	Rec	Notes	Ref
	Saturday 24 January 1976	Widnes	19-13	Hull F.C.	Headingley	9035	6275	7	

==== Teams and scorers ====
Widnes	No.	Hull
	teams	
Ray Dutton	1	Mike Stephenson
Alan Prescott	2	Alf Macklin
Mick George	3	George Clark
Mal Aspey	4	Steve Portz
David Jenkins	5	Paul Hunter
Eric Hughes	6	Brian Hancock
Reg Bowden	7	Ken Foulkes
Jim Mills	8	Bill Ramsey
Keith Elwell	9	Peter Flanagan
John Wood	10	Alan Wardell
John Foran	11	Keith Boxall
Barry Sheridan	12	Malcolm Walker
Mick Adams	13	Mick Crane
? Not used	14	? Not used
? Not used	15	Chris Davidson (for Ken Foulkes)
	Coach	
19	score	13
8	HT	8
	Scorers	
	Tries	
David Jenkins (2)	T	Paul Hunter (1)
Reg Bowden (1)	T	Mick Crane (2)
Mick Adams (1)	T	
	Goals	
Ray Dutton (3)	G	Keith Boxhall (2)
	Drop Goals	
Reg Bowden (1)	DG	
Referee		J. V. Moss (Manchester)
Man of the match		Reg Bowden - Widnes - scrum-half
Competition Sponsor		Player's No.6

Scoring - Try = three points - Goal = two points - Drop goal = one point

=== Prize money ===
As part of the sponsorship deal and funds, the prize money awarded to the competing teams for this season was as follows:

Finish Position	Cash prize	No. receiving prize	Total cash
Winner	£6,000	1	£6,000
Runner-up	£3,000	1	£3,000
Semi-finalist	£1,500	2	£3,000
Loser in Rd 3	£600	4	£2,400
Loser in Rd 2	£450	8	£3,600
Loser in Rd 1	£300	16	£4,800
Grand Total			£22,800

=== The road to success ===
This tree excludes any preliminary round fixtures

First round
Huddersfield	20
Warrington	12
Barrow	16
Pilkington Recs	9
Bradford Northern	12
Wakefield Trinity	32
Castleford	26
York	15
Hull Kingston Rovers	33
Rochdale Hornets	10
Leigh	12
Featherstone Rovers	5
Wigan	30
Keighley	7
Widnes	27
Dewsbury	12
Mayfield	3
Salford	53
Huyton	14
Oldham	20
Workington Town	16
Bramley	9
New Hunslet	28
Halifax	8
Doncaster	12
Hull F.C.	23
Swinton	7
Leeds	23
Blackpool Borough	11
St. Helens	36
Batley	18
Whitehaven	9

Second round
Huddersfield	14
Barrow	5
Wakefield Trinity	14
Castleford	24
Hull Kingston Rovers	23
Leigh	8
Wigan	5
Widnes	18
Salford	46
Oldham	3
Workington Town	23
New Hunslet	6
Hull F.C.	9 (23)
Leeds	9 (11)
St. Helens	47
Batley	9

Third round
Huddersfield	10
Castleford	19
Hull Kingston Rovers	14
Widnes	18
Salford	16
Workington Town	8
Hull F.C.	9
St. Helens	8

Semi-finals
Castleford	9
Widnes	17
Salford	14
Hull F.C.	22

Final
Widnes	19
Hull F.C.	13

== Notes and comments ==
1 * Mayfield are a Junior (amateur) club from Rochdale
2 * Although Mayfield were drawn at home, the match was moved to Salford
3 * Rothmans Rugby League Yearbooks 1990-1991 and 1991-92 and Wigan official archives give the score as 3-57, but RUGBYLEAGUEprojects and The News of the World/Empire News annual 1976–77 give it as 3-53
4 * Pilkington Recs are a Junior (amateur) club from St Helens, home ground was City Road until they moved to Ruskin Drive from 2011 to 2012
5 * Wigan official archives gives the score as 25-8 but RUGBYLEAGUEprojects gives it as 28-8
6 * Wigan official archives gives the score as 23-3 but RUGBYLEAGUEprojects and The News of the World/Empire News annual 1976–77 give it as 23-8
7 * Headingley, Leeds, is the home ground of Leeds RLFC with a capacity of 21,000. The record attendance was 40,175 for a league match between Leeds and Bradford Northern on 21 May 1947.

== See also ==
- 1975–76 Northern Rugby Football League season
- 1975 Lancashire Cup
- 1975 Yorkshire Cup
- Player's No.6 Trophy
- Rugby league county cups
