= Keith Elwell =

GB & England international rugby league footballer

Personal information
- Full name: Keith Elwell
- Born: 12 February 1950 (age 76) Widnes, Lancashire, England

Playing information
- Height: 5 ft 7 in (1.70 m)
- Position: Hooker
Club
Years	Team	Pld	T	G	FG	P
1970–86	Widnes	591	87	14	36	335
1985(loan)	→ Barrow	4	1	0	0	4
	Total	595	88	14	36	339
Representative
Years	Team	Pld	T	G	FG	P
1975–80	Lancashire	9	2	0	1	7
1978	England	2	0	0	0	0
1977–80	Great Britain	3	0	0	0	0

Keith Elwell (born 12 February 1950), also known by the nicknames of "The Mole" or "Chiefy", is an English former professional rugby league footballer who played in the 1970s and 1980s. He played at representative level for Great Britain, England and Lancashire, and at club level for Widnes and on loan to Barrow, as a hooker.

== Background ==
Elwell was born in Widnes, Lancashire, England on 12 February 1950.

== Playing career ==
=== International honours ===
Elwell won caps for England while at Widnes in 1978 against France, and Wales, and won caps for Great Britain while at Widnes in the 1977 Rugby League World Cup against Australia, and in 1980 against New Zealand (2 matches).

=== Challenge Cup Final appearances ===
Elwell played hooker in Widnes' 14–7 victory over Warrington in the 1974–75 Challenge Cup Final during the 1974–75 season at Wembley Stadium, London on Saturday 10 May 1975, in front of a crowd of 85,998, played hooker, and scored a drop goal in the 5–20 defeat by St. Helens in the 1975–76 Challenge Cup Final during the 1975–76 season at Wembley Stadium, London on Saturday 8 May 1976, in front of a crowd of 89,982, played hooker in the 7–16 defeat by Leeds in the 1976–77 Challenge Cup Final during the 1976–77 season at Wembley Stadium, London on Saturday 7 May 1977, in front of a crowd of 80,871, the 7–16 victory over Wakefield Trinity in the 1978–79 Challenge Cup Final during the 1978–79 season at Wembley Stadium, London on Saturday 5 May 1979, in front of a crowd of 94,218, played hooker in the 18–9 victory over Hull Kingston Rovers in the 1980–81 Challenge Cup Final during the 1980–81 season at Wembley Stadium, London on Saturday 2 May 1981, in front of a crowd of 92,496, played hooker in the 14–14 draw with Hull F.C. in the 1981–82 Challenge Cup Final during the 1981–82 season at Wembley Stadium, London on Saturday 1 May 1982, in front of a crowd of 92,147, played hooker in the 9–18 defeat by Hull F.C. in the 1981–82 Challenge Cup Final replay during the 1981–82 season at Elland Road, Leeds on Wednesday 19 May 1982, in front of a crowd of 41,171, played hooker in the 19–6 victory over Wigan in the 1983–84 Challenge Cup Final during the 1983–84 season at Wembley Stadium, London on Saturday 5 May 1984, in front of a crowd of 80,116.

=== County Cup Final appearances ===
Elwell played hooker in Widnes' 6–2 victory over Salford in the 1974–75 Lancashire Cup Final during the 1974–75 season at Central Park, Wigan on Saturday 2 November 1974, played hooker in the 16–11 victory over Workington Town in the 1976–77 Lancashire Cup Final during the 1976–77 season at Central Park, Wigan on Saturday 30 October 1976, played hooker in the 15–13 victory over Workington Town in the 1978–79 Lancashire Cup Final during the 1978–79 season at Central Park, Wigan on Saturday 7 October 1978, played hooker, and scored a drop goal in the 11–0 victory over Workington Town in the 1979–80 Lancashire Cup Final during the 1979–80 season at the Willows, Salford on Saturday 8 December 1979, played hooker in the 3–8 defeat by Leigh in the 1981–82 Lancashire Cup Final during the 1981–82 season at Central Park, Wigan on Saturday 26 September 1981, and played hooker in the 8–12 defeat by Barrow in the 1983–84 Lancashire Cup Final during the 1983–84 season at Central Park, Wigan on Saturday 1 October 1983.

=== BBC2 Floodlit Trophy Final appearances ===
Elwell played hooker in Widnes' 0–5 defeat by Leigh in the 1972 BBC2 Floodlit Trophy Final during the 1972–73 season at Central Park, Wigan on Tuesday 19 December 1972, played hooker in the 7–15 defeat by Bramley in the 1973 BBC2 Floodlit Trophy Final during the 1973–74 season at Naughton Park, Widnes on Tuesday 18 December 1973, and played hooker in the 13–7 victory over St. Helens in the 1978 BBC2 Floodlit Trophy Final during the 1978–79 season at Knowsley Road, St. Helens on Tuesday 12 December 1978.

=== Player's No.6 Trophy/John Player/John Player Special Trophy Final appearances ===
Elwell played hooker in Widnes' 2–3 defeat by Bradford Northern in the 1974–75 Player's No.6 Trophy Final during the 1974–75 season at Wilderspool Stadium, Warrington on Saturday 25 January 1975, played hooker in the 19–13 victory over Hull F.C. in the 1975–76 Player's No.6 Trophy Final during the 1975–76 season at Headingley, Leeds on Saturday 24 January 1976, played hooker in the 4–9 defeat by Warrington in the 1977–78 Players No.6 Trophy Final during the 1977–78 season at Knowsley Road, St. Helens on Saturday 28 January 1978, played hooker, and scored 2-drop goals in the 16–4 victory over Warrington in the 1978–79 John Player Trophy Final during the 1978–79 season at Knowsley Road, St. Helens on Saturday 28 April 1979, played hooker in the 0–6 defeat by Bradford Northern in the 1979–80 John Player Trophy Final during the 1979–80 season at Headingley, Leeds on Saturday 5 January 1980, and played hooker in the 10–18 defeat by Leeds in the 1983–84 John Player Special Trophy Final during the 1983–84 season at Central Park, Wigan on Saturday 14 January 1984.

=== Open Rugby inaugural World XIII ===
The Open Rugby inaugural World XIII was revealed in June 1978, it was; Graham Eadie, John Atkinson, Steve Rogers, Jean-Marc Bourret, Green Vigo, Roger Millward, Steve Nash, Jim Mills, Keith Elwell, Steve Pitchford, Terry Randall, George Nicholls and Greg Pierce.

=== Career records ===
Keith Elwell holds Widnes' "Most Appearances in a Career" record with 591, he also holds the rugby league world record for consecutive games played with a total of 239 (242?) from the 1976–77 Challenge Cup Final against Leeds on Saturday 7 May 1977, to the match at Hull F.C. on Sunday 26 September 1982, 5-years 4-months and 19-days later.

== Honours ==
Club

- RFL Championship: 1977–78
- Challenge Cup: 1974–75, 1978–79, 1980–81, 1983–84
- Premiership: 1979–80, 1981–82, 1982–83
- League Cup: 1975–76, 1978–79
- Lancashire Cup: 1974–75, 1975–76, 1976–77, 1978–79, 1979–80
- BBC2 Floodlit Trophy: 1978–79

Individual

- Open Rugby World XIII, June 1978
- Widnes Hall of Fame inductee
