= Arnold Walker (rugby league) =

Great Britain and England international footballer (1952–2022)

Personal information
- Full name: Thomas Arnold Walker
- Born: 15 April 1952 Whitehaven, Cumbria, England
- Died: 12 May 2022 (aged 70)

Playing information
- Position: Stand-off, Scrum-half
Club
| Years | Team | Pld | T | G | FG | P |
|---|---|---|---|---|---|---|
| 1971–80 | Workington Town | 195 | 53 | 2 | 35 | 198 |
| 1980–83 | Whitehaven | 78 | 11 | 42 | 35 | 152 |
| | Total | 273 | 64 | 44 | 70 | 350 |
Representative
| Years | Team | Pld | T | G | FG | P |
| 1973–82 | Cumbria | 19 | 8 | 12 | 0 | 48 |
| 1981 | England | 1 | 0 | 0 | 0 | 0 |
| 1980 | Great Britain | 1 | 0 | 0 | 0 | 0 |

Thomas Arnold Walker (15 April 1952 – 12 May 2022), also known by the nickname of "Boxer", was an English professional rugby league footballer who played in the 1970s and 1980s. He played at representative level for Great Britain, England and Cumbria, and at club level for Kells A.R.L.F.C., and Cumbrian rivals; Workington Town and Whitehaven, as a stand-off, or scrum-half.

== Background ==
Walker was born in Whitehaven, Cumberland, England, he earned the nickname 'Boxer' as a child after he received a pair of boxing gloves as a gift; in his own words, "I wore them every day, the name just stuck." He worked for 12-years at the Haig Colliery, Kells, Whitehaven.

== Playing career ==
=== Workington Town ===
Walker played scrum-half in Workington Town's 11–16 defeat by Widnes in the 1976 Lancashire Cup Final at Central Park, Wigan on Saturday 30 October 1976, played scrum-half, scored 2-drop goals, and was man of the match in the 16–13 victory over Wigan in the 1977 Lancashire Cup Final at Wilderspool Stadium, Warrington on Saturday 29 October 1977, played scrum-half in the 13–15 defeat by Widnes in the 1978 Lancashire Cup Final at Central Park, Wigan on Saturday 7 October 1978, and played scrum-half in the 0–11 defeat by Widnes in the 1979 Lancashire Cup Final at The Willows, Salford on Saturday 8 December 1979.

=== Whitehaven ===
Walker was transferred to Whitehaven in January 1980 for a fee of £30,000.

In October 1981, he suffered a serious neck injury in a match against Hull Kingston Rovers, resulting in the match being abandoned. He ended his playing career after suffering a second injury at the start of the 1983–84 season against Widnes.

=== Representative honours ===
Walker won a cap for England while at Whitehaven in 1981 against France, and won a cap for Great Britain while at Whitehaven in 1980 against New Zealand.

Walker won cap(s) for Cumbria while at Workington Town, including the 9–3 victory over New Zealand at Recreation Ground, Whitehaven during October 1980.

=== Open Rugby World XIII ===
Arnold 'Boxer' Walker was selected at scrum-half in the 1980 Open Rugby World XIII.

== Honours ==
Walker is an inductee in the halls of fame at both Workington and Whitehaven.
