= Peter Gorley =

Great Britain and England international rugby league footballer

Personal information
- Full name: Peter Gorley
- Born: 10 July 1951 (age 74) Maryport, Cumberland, England

Playing information
- Height: 6 ft 2 in (1.88 m)
- Weight: 15 st 0 lb (95 kg)
- Position: Second-row
Club
Years	Team	Pld	T	G	FG	P
1975–79	Workington Town	124	13	0	0	39
1979–86	St. Helens	234	46	0	0	150
1986–87	Whitehaven	3	0	0	0	0
	Total	361	59	0	0	189
Representative
Years	Team	Pld	T	G	FG	P
1977–82	Cumbria	8	3	0	0	9
1980–81	England	3	1	0	0	3
1980–81	Great Britain	3	0	0	0	0
- Relatives: Les Gorley (brother)

Peter Gorley (born 10 July 1951) is an English former professional rugby league footballer who played in the 1970s and 1980s. He played at representative level for Great Britain, England and Cumbria, and at club level for Workington Town, St. Helens and Whitehaven, as a second-row.

== Early life, family and education ==
Gorley was born in Maryport, Cumberland, England.

== Playing career ==
=== Workington Town ===
Gorley appeared as a substitute (replacing loose forward William Pattinson) in Workington Town's 11–16 defeat by Widnes in the 1976 Lancashire Cup Final during the 1976–77 season at Central Park, Wigan on Saturday 30 October 1976, played at second-row in the 13–10 victory over Wigan in the 1977 Final during the 1977–78 season at Wilderspool Stadium, Warrington on Saturday 29 October 1977, and played at second-row in the 13-15 defeat by Widnes in the 1978 Lancashire Cup Final during the 1978–79 season at Central Park, Wigan on Saturday 7 October 1978.

=== St Helens ===
Gorley was signed by St Helens in October 1979 for a fee of £22,000. He played at second-row in St Helens 0–16 defeat by Warrington in the 1982 Lancashire Cup Final during the 1982–83 season at Central Park, Wigan on Saturday 23 October 1982, and played at prop in the 26-18 victory over Wigan in the 1984 Lancashire Cup Final during the 1984–85 season at Central Park, Wigan on Sunday 28 October 1984.

=== Representative honours ===
Gorley won caps for England while at St. Helens in 1980 against Wales, and France (sub), in 1981 against Wales, and won caps for Great Britain while at St. Helens in 1980 against New Zealand, and in 1981 against France, and France (sub).

Gorley represented Cumbria.

== Personal life ==
Peter Gorley is the younger brother of the rugby league footballer, Leslie "Les" Gorley.
