= Paul Charlton (rugby league) =

English former rugby league coach and former Great Britain and England international

Personal information
- Full name: Harold Paul Charlton
- Born: 6 December 1941 (age 84) Whitehaven, England

Playing information
- Position: Fullback
Club
Years	Team	Pld	T	G	FG	P
1961–69	Workington Town	241+3	79	77	0	391
1969–75	Salford	233+1	99	2	0	301
1975–80	Workington Town	174+1	32	0	0	96
1981	Blackpool Borough	10+1	2	0	0	6
	Total	664	212	79	0	794
Representative
Years	Team	Pld	T	G	FG	P
1965–79	Cumberland/Cumbria	31+1	4	10	0	32
1975	England	1	0	0	0	0
1965–74	Great Britain	18+1	4	0	0	12
1974	GB tour games	10+1	4	0	0	12

Coaching information
Club
Years	Team	Gms	W	D	L	W%
1975–76	Workington Town	34	23	4	7	68
1982	Workington Town	14	3	1	10	21
1994–97	Carlisle	49	30	0	19	61
1998–01	Barrow	85	37	1	47	44
	Total	182	93	6	83	51

Harold Paul Charlton (born 6 December 1941) is an English former professional rugby league footballer who played in the 1960s, 1970s and 1980s, and coached in the 1970s, 1980s and 1990s. He played at representative level for Great Britain, England, Cumberland and Cumbria, and at club level for Kells ARLFC (in Kells, Whitehaven), Workington Town (two spells), Salford and Blackpool Borough, as a fullback, and coached at club level for Workington Town. He was part of the Great Britain squad which won the 1972 World Cup.

== Background ==
Paul Charlton was born in Whitehaven, Cumberland, and as of 2017 he is living in the Gold Coast, Queensland, Australia, and now plays touch football.

== Playing career ==
=== Workington Town ===
In his two spells at Workington Town, Charlton made 415 appearances (Workington Town's "Appearances in a Career" record), scoring 111 tries, and kicking 77 goals, 65 of which came in two seasons, he scored 28 goals in the 1965–66 season, and 37 goals in the 1968–69 season, with Syd Lowdon and Jappie Ferreira being the primary goal-kickers in the early 1960s, followed by Ike Southward in the mid to late 1960s, during Charlton's second spell at Workington Town, the primary goal-kicker was Iain MacCorquodale (who scored 775 goals from 1972 to 1980, including over 100 goals in 4 consecutive seasons).

Charlton played fullback in Workington Town's 11-16 defeat by Widnes in the 1976–77 Lancashire Cup Final during the 1976–77 season at Central Park, Wigan on Saturday 30 October 1976, played fullback in the 16-13 victory over Wigan in the 1977–78 Lancashire Cup Final during the 1977–78 season at Wilderspool Stadium, Warrington on Saturday 29 October 1977, played fullback in the 13-15 defeat by Widnes in the 1978–79 Lancashire Cup Final during the 1978–79 season at Central Park, Wigan on Saturday 7 October 1978, and played fullback in the 0-11 defeat by Widnes in the 1979–80 Lancashire Cup Final during the 1979–80 season at the Willows, Weaste, Salford, on Saturday 8 December 1979.

=== Salford ===
Paul Charlton played fullback, and scored a try in Salford's 25-11 victory over Swinton in the 1972–73 Lancashire Cup Final during the 1972–73 season at Wilderspool Stadium, Warrington on Saturday 21 October 1972, and played fullback in the 9-19 defeat by Wigan in the 1973–74 Lancashire Cup Final during the 1973–74 season at Wilderspool Stadium, Warrington on Saturday 13 October 1973, played fullback in the 2-6 defeat by Widnes in the 1974–75 Lancashire Cup Final during the 1974–75 season at Central Park, Wigan on Saturday 2 November 1974.

Paul Charlton played fullback in Salford's 0-0 draw with Warrington in the 1974 BBC2 Floodlit Trophy Final during the 1974–75 season at The Willows, Salford on Tuesday 17 December 1974, and he did not play (Frank Stead played fullback) in the 10-5 victory over Warrington in the 1974 BBC2 Floodlit Trophy Final replay during the 1974–75 season at Wilderspool Stadium, Warrington on Tuesday 28 January 1975.

Paul Charlton played fullback in Salford's 7-12 defeat by Leeds in the 1972–73 Player's No.6 Trophy Final during the 1972–73 season at Fartown, Huddersfield on Saturday 24 March 1973.

=== International honours ===
Charlton won a cap for England while at Salford in the 1975 Rugby League World Cup against France, and won caps for Great Britain while at Workington in 1965 against New Zealand, while at Salford in the 1970 Rugby League World Cup against New Zealand (sub), in 1972 against France (2 matches), in the 1972 Rugby League World Cup against Australia, France, New Zealand, and Australia, in 1973 against Australia (3 matches), and in 1974 against France (2 matches), Australia (3 matches) and New Zealand (3 matches), during the 1974 Great Britain Lions tour of Australia and New Zealand he also played 11 non-Test matches scoring 8-tries and 12-goals for 48-points.

== Personal life ==
Charlton married Lily (née Wilson) in 1965 in Whitehaven. They had two children: rugby league footballer who played in the 1980s, 1990s and 2000s, and coached in the 2000s and 2010s, Gary Paul Charlton (born 1967, Whitehaven), and Melanie Jayne Charlton (born 1971, Whitehaven).
