= Dennis Brown (rugby) =

Wales international rugby league footballer

Personal information
- Full name: Dennis Brown
- Born: 24 September 1944 (age 81) Wales

Playing information

Rugby union
- Position: Wing
Club
Years	Team	Pld	T	G	FG	P
	Royal Marines

Rugby league
- Position: Wing
Club
Years	Team	Pld	T	G	FG	P
≥1964–≤75	Widnes	173	94	3
Representative
Years	Team	Pld	T	G	FG	P
1969	Wales	1	0	0	0	0

Dennis Brown (born 24 September 1944), also known by the nickname of "Brown Bomber", is a Welsh rugby union and professional rugby league footballer who played in the 1960s and 1970s. He played rugby union (RU) for Cardiff Schoolboys , and the Royal Marines, as a Wing, and representative level rugby league (RL) for Wales, and at club level for Widnes, as a wing. Dennis Brown served in the Royal Marines.

== Early life ==
Brown was born on 24 September 1944, the same day as the rugby player Jim Mills. He was born to a Nigerian father and Welsh mother.

== Playing career ==
=== International honours ===
Dennis Brown won a cap for Wales (RL) while at Widnes in 1969.

=== County Cup Final appearances ===
Dennis Brown played on the wing in Widnes 8–15 defeat by Wigan in the 1971 Lancashire Cup Final during the 1970–71 season at Knowsley Road, St. Helens on Saturday 28 August 1971.

=== Club career ===
Dennis Brown played for Widnes under the pseudonym of A. Newman to protect his amateur rugby union status, although he subsequently appeared under his own name, his Widnes appearances were restricted by his duties serving in the Royal Marines.
