= 1979–80 Lancashire Cup =

- Structure: Regional knockout championship
- Teams: 14
- Winners: Widnes
- Runners-up: Workington Town

1979–80 was the sixty-seventh occasion on which the Lancashire Cup completion had been held.

Widnes won the trophy by beating Workington Town by the score of 11-0

The match was played at The Willows, Salford, (historically in the county of Lancashire). The attendance was 6887 and receipts were £7100.00

After relatively little success in the competition, Workington Town had reached the semi-final stage in 1973–74, 1974–75 and 1975–76, had been runner-up in 1976–77, winner in 1977–78, and runners-up in 1978–79 and now again in 1979–80; not a bad eight year record.

== Background ==
The total number of teams entering the competition remained at last season’s total of 14 with no junior/amateur clubs taking part.

The same fixture format was retained, but due to the number of participating clubs, this resulted in one “blank” or “dummy” fixture in the first round, and one bye in the second round.

== Competition and results ==
=== Round 1 ===
Involved 7 matches (with one “blank” fixture) and 14 clubs

Game No	Fixture date	Home team	Score	Away team	Venue	Att	Rec	Notes	Ref
1	Sun 19 Aug 1979	Barrow	44-11	Huyton	Craven Park				
2	Sun 19 Aug 1979	Blackpool Borough	20-9	Whitehaven	Borough Park				
3	Sun 19 Aug 1979	Leigh	20-3	Rochdale Hornets	Hilton Park				
4	Sun 19 Aug 1979	St. Helens	16-28	Widnes	Knowsley Road	8350			
5	Sun 19 Aug 1979	Swinton	15-22	Oldham	Station Road				
6	Sun 19 Aug 1979	Warrington	17-14	Wigan	Wilderspool	5038			
7	Sun 19 Aug 1979	Workington Town	14-8	Salford	Derwent Park				
8		blank		blank					

=== Round 2 - Quarter-finals ===
Involved 3 matches (with one bye) and 7 clubs

Game No	Fixture date	Home team	Score	Away team	Venue	Att	Rec	Notes	Ref
1	Sun 26 Aug 1979	Barrow	50-8	Blackpool Borough	Craven Park				
2	Sun 26 Aug 1979	Oldham	6-34	Warrington	Watersheddings				
3	Sun 26 Aug 1979	Widnes	33-3	Leigh	Naughton Park				
4		Workington Town		bye					

=== Round 3 – Semi-finals ===
Involved 2 matches and 4 clubs

Game No	Fixture date	Home team	Score	Away team	Venue	Att	Rec	Notes	Ref
1	Wed 26 Sep 1979	Barrow	4-6	Workington Town	Craven Park				
2	Wed 24 Oct 1979	Warrington	2-13	Widnes	Wilderspool				

=== Final ===
Game No	Fixture date	Home team	Score	Away team	Venue	Att	Rec	Notes	Ref
	Saturday 8 December 1979	Widnes	11-0	Workington Town	The Willows	6,887	7,100	1	

==== Teams and scorers ====
Widnes	№	Workington Town
	teams	
David Eckersley	1	Paul Charlton
Stuart Wright	2	Iain McCorquodale
Mal Aspey	3	Kevin Maughan
Eric Hughes	4	Ian Thompson
Mick Burke	5	David Beck
David Moran	6	Ian Rudd
Reg Bowden	7	Arnold "Boxer" Walker
Brian Hogan	8	Harry Beverley
Keith Elwell	9	Alan Banks
Glyn Shaw	10	Gary Wallbanks
Les Gorley	11	Bill Pattinson
Alan Dearden	12	Ray Lewis
Mick Adams	13	John Dobie
Mick George (for Eric Hughes)	14	Tony Roper (for Arnold Walker)
David Hull (unused)	15	Alan Varty (for Gary Wallbanks)
11	score	0
10	HT	0
	Scorers	
	Tries	
David Moran (1)	T	
Mick Adams (1)	T	
	Goals	
Mick Burke (2)	G	
	Drop Goals	
Keith Elwell (1)	DG	
Referee		W H (Billy) Thompson (Huddersfield)
Man of the match		Mick Adams - Widnes - loose forward
sponsored by		Burtonwood Brewery
Competition Sponsor		Forshaws (Burtonwood Brewery Co Ltd)

Scoring - Try = three points - Goal = two points - Drop goal = one point

=== The road to success ===
First round
Swinton	15
Oldham	22
Warrington	17
Wigan	14
St. Helens	16
Widnes	28
Leigh	20
Rochdale Hornets	3
Barrow	44
Huyton	11
Blackpool Borough	20
Whitehaven	9
Workington Town	14
Salford	8
blank
blank

Second round
Oldham	6
Warrington	34
Widnes	33
Leigh	3
Barrow	50
Blackpool Borough	8
Workington Town
bye

Semi-finals
Warrington	2
Widnes	13
Barrow	4
Workington Town	6

Final
Widnes	11
Workington Town	0

== Notes and comments ==
1 * The Willows was the home ground of Salford with a final capacity of 11,363 which included 2,500 seats. The record attendance was 26,470 on the 13 February 1937 in the Challenge Cup first round match vs Warrington. The final match played on 11 September 2011 at The Willows attracted 10,146 spectators to a Super League match which saw Salford lose 18-44 to Catalans Dragons, a record for a Salford home match in Super League.

== See also ==
- 1979–80 Northern Rugby Football League season
- Rugby league county cups
