= Ray Dutton =

Great Britain and England international rugby league footballer

Personal information
- Full name: Raymond F. Dutton
- Born: c. 1945 Runcorn district, Cheshire, England

Playing information
- Height: 6 ft 1 in (1.85 m)
- Weight: 14 st 2 lb (90 kg)
- Position: Fullback
Club
Years	Team	Pld	T	G	FG	P
1966–78	Widnes	398	13	1072	10	2195
1978–81	Whitehaven	82	1	180	4	367
	Total	480	14	1252	14	2562
Representative
Years	Team	Pld	T	G	FG	P
1970–75	England	3	0	7	0	14
1970	Great Britain	6	0	22	0	44
1968–75	Lancashire	12	0	46	0	92
1970	GB tour games	7	2	34	0	74

Coaching information
Club
Years	Team	Gms	W	D	L	W%
1978–79	Whitehaven

Raymond "Ray" F. Dutton (born c. 1945) is an English former professional rugby league footballer who played in the 1960s, 1970s and 1980s, and coached in the 1970s and 1980s. He played at representative level for Great Britain and England, and at club level for Runcorn ARLFC, Widnes Rovers ARLFC, Widnes and Whitehaven, as a right-footed toe-end style (rather than round the corner style) goal-kicking fullback, and coached at club level for Whitehaven and Widnes Tigers ARLFC (1981 – c. 1984).

== Background ==
Dutton's birth was registered in Runcorn district, Cheshire, England, he worked as a painter and decorator c. 1976–81, as of c. 2008 he worked at the North West Ambulance Service in Widnes, Cheshire, England.

== Playing career ==
=== International honours ===
Dutton won caps for England while at Widnes in 1970 against Wales, and France, in the 1975 Rugby League World Cup against Australia, and won caps for Great Britain while at Widnes in 1970 against New Zealand (2 matches), and in the 1970 Rugby League World Cup against Australia, France, New Zealand, and Australia.

=== Challenge Cup Final appearances ===
Dutton played fullback scored 5-goals, 1-drop goal, and was named Man of the match winning the Lance Todd Trophy in Widnes' 14-7 victory over Warrington in the 1975 Challenge Cup Final during the 1974–75 season at Wembley Stadium, London on Saturday 10 May 1975, in front of a crowd of 85,998, played fullback and scored 2-goals, in the 5-20 defeat by St. Helens in the 1976 Challenge Cup Final during the 1975–76 season at Wembley Stadium, London on Saturday 8 May 1976, in front of a crowd of 89,982, and played fullback and scored 2-goals, in the 7-16 defeat by Leeds in the 1977 Challenge Cup Final during the 1976–77 season at Wembley Stadium, London on Saturday 7 May 1977, in front of a crowd of 80,871.

=== County Cup Final appearances ===
Dutton played fullback in Widnes 8-15 defeat by Wigan in the 1971 Lancashire Cup Final during the 1970–71 season at Knowsley Road, St. Helens on Saturday 28 August 1971, played fullback, and scored a goal in the 6-2 victory over Salford in the 1974 Lancashire Cup Final during the 1974–75 season at Central Park, Wigan on Saturday 2 November 1974, played fullback, and scored 3-goals and a drop goal in the 16-7 victory over Salford in the 1975 Lancashire Cup Final during the 1975–76 season at Central Park, Wigan on Saturday 4 October 1975, played fullback, and scored 4-goals and 1-drop goal in the 16-11 victory over Workington Town in the 1976 Lancashire Cup Final during the 1976–77 season at Central Park, Wigan on Saturday 30 October 1976.

=== BBC2 Floodlit Trophy Final appearances ===
Dutton played fullback in Widnes' 0-5 defeat by Leigh in the 1972 BBC2 Floodlit Trophy Final during the 1972–73 season at Central Park, Wigan on Tuesday 19 December 1972, and played fullback, and scored 2-goals in the 7-15 defeat by Bramley in the 1973 BBC2 Floodlit Trophy Final during the 1973–74 season at Naughton Park, Widnes on Tuesday 18 December 1973.

=== Player's No.6 Trophy Final appearances ===
Dutton played fullback, and scored a goal in Widnes' 2-3 defeat by Bradford Northern in the 1974–75 Player's No.6 Trophy Final during the 1974–75 season at Wilderspool Stadium, Warrington on Saturday 25 January 1975, and played fullback, and scored 3- conversions in the 19-13 victory over Hull F.C. in the 1975–76 Player's No.6 Trophy Final during the 1975–76 season at Headingley, Leeds on Saturday 24 January 1976.

=== Testimonial match ===
Dutton's Testimonial match at Widnes took place in 1976.

=== Career records ===
Dutton holds Widnes' "Most Points In A Career" record with 2195, and "Most Goals In A Career" record with 1083.

=== Club career ===
Dutton was signed by Widnes during 1964, he made his début for Widnes during 1966, he was transferred from Widnes to Whitehaven during 1978, as the then Widnes coach; Doug Laughton felt that Widnes required a different goal-kicker, he remained as a Whitehaven player until the end of the 1980–81 season, he retired from playing rugby league following a knee injury while training on holiday in Jersey.

== Coaching career ==
=== Club career ===
Dutton replaced Bill Smith as the coach of Whitehaven, he was the coach of Whitehaven from October 1978 to October 1979, he was replaced as coach by Phil Kitchin, but he remained as a Whitehaven player until the end of the 1980–81 season.
