= 1978–79 Lancashire Cup =

- Structure: Regional knockout championship
- Teams: 14
- Winners: Widnes
- Runners-up: Workington Town

1978–79 was the sixty-sixth occasion on which the Lancashire Cup completion had been held.

Widnes won the trophy by beating Workington Town by the score of 15-13

The match was played at Central Park, Wigan, (historically in the county of Lancashire). The attendance was 10,020 and receipts were £6,261.00

After relatively little success in the competition, Workington Town had reached the semi-final stage in 1973, 1974 and 1975, had been runner-up in 1976, winner in 1977, and now runners-up again in 1978. They would go on to be runners-up again in 1979.

== Background ==
The total number of teams entering the competition remained at last season’s total of 14 with no junior/amateur clubs taking part.

The same fixture format was retained, but due to the number of participating clubs, this resulted in one “blank” or “dummy” fixture in the first round, and one bye in the second round.

== Competition and results ==
=== Round 1 ===
Involved 7 matches (with one “blank” fixture) and 14 clubs

Game No	Fixture date	Home team	Score	Away team	Venue	Att	Rec	Notes	Ref
1	Fri 18 Aug 1978	Salford	30-15	Oldham	The Willows				
2	Fri 18 Aug 1978	Whitehaven	15-12	Blackpool Borough	Recreation Ground				
3	Sun 20 Aug 1978	Barrow	13-17	Leigh	Craven Park				
4	Sun 20 Aug 1978	St. Helens	14-14	Rochdale Hornets	Knowsley Road	4000			
5	Sun 20 Aug 1978	Warrington	18-4	Swinton	Wilderspool				
6	Sun 20 Aug 1978	Widnes	43-6	Huyton	Naughton Park				
7	Sun 20 Aug 1978	Workington Town	14-2	Wigan	Derwent Park	4200			
8		blank		blank					

=== Round 1 – First replays ===
Involved 1 match and 2 clubs

Game No	Fixture date	Home team	Score	Away team	Venue	Att	Rec	Notes	Ref
1	Wed 23 Aug 1978	Rochdale Hornets	8-8	St. Helens	Athletic Grounds	2384			

=== Round 1 – Second replays ===
Involved 1 match and 2 clubs

Game No	Fixture date	Home team	Score	Away team	Venue	Att	Rec	Notes	Ref
1	Fri 25 Aug 1978	St. Helens	28-9	Rochdale Hornets	Central Park	2906			

=== Round 2 - Quarter-finals ===
Involved 3 matches (with one bye) and 7 clubs

Game No	Fixture date	Home team	Score	Away team	Venue	Att	Rec	Notes	Ref
1	Sun 27 Aug 1978	Leigh	21-4	St. Helens	Hilton Park	5600			
2	Sun 27 Aug 1978	Whitehaven	6-19	Salford	Recreation Ground				
3	Sun 27 Aug 1978	Widnes	17-10	Warrington	Naughton Park				
4		Workington Town		bye					

=== Round 3 – Semi-finals ===
Involved 2 matches and 4 clubs

Game No	Fixture date	Home team	Score	Away team	Venue	Att	Rec	Notes	Ref
1	Wed 13 Sep 1978	Salford	8-9	Workington Town	The Willows				
2	Wed 13 Sep 1978	Widnes	28-14	Leigh	Naughton Park				

=== Final ===
Game No	Fixture date	Home team	Score	Away team	Venue	Att	Rec	Notes	Ref
	Saturday 7 October 1978	Widnes	15-13	Workington Town	Central Park	10,020	6,261	1	

==== Teams and scorers ====
Widnes	№	Workington Town
	teams	
David Eckersley	1	Paul Charlton
Stuart Wright	2	David Collister
Mal Aspey	3	John Risman
Mick George	4	Ray Wilkins
Mick Burke	5	Iain McCorquodale
Eric Hughes	6	Derek McMillan
Reg Bowden	7	Arnold "Boxer" Walker
Jim Mills	8	Harry Beverley
Keith Elwell	9	Alan Banks
Glyn Shaw	10	Eddie Bowman
Mick Adams	11	Robert Blackwood
Alan Dearden	12	Peter Gorley
Doug Laughton	13	Bill Pattinson
Paul Woods	14	David Smith
David Hull (for Alan Dearden)	15	Les Gorley (for William "Bill" Pattinson)
15	score	13
5	HT	11
	Scorers	
	Tries	
Stuart Wright (1)	T	Ray Wilkins (1)
Doug Laughton (2)	T	Iain McCorquodale (1)
	T	Les Gorley (1)
	Goals	
Mick Burke (3)	G	Iain McCorquodale (2)
Referee		W H (Billy) Thompson (Huddersfield)
Man of the match		Arnold "Boxer" Walker - Workington Town - scrum-half
sponsored by		Burtonwood Brewery
Competition Sponsor		Forshaws (Burtonwood Brewery Co Ltd)

Scoring - Try = three points - Goal = two points - Drop goal = one point

=== The road to success ===
First round
Widnes	43
Huyton	6
Warrington	18
Swinton	4
Barrow	13
Leigh	17
St. Helens	14-8-9
Rochdale Hornets	14-8-28
Whitehaven	15
Blackpool Borough	12
Salford	30
Oldham	15
Workington Town	14
Wigan	2
blank
blank

Second round
Widnes	17
Warrington	10
Leigh	21
St. Helens	4
Whitehaven	6
Salford	19
Workington Town
bye

Semi-finals
Widnes	17
Leigh	10
Salford	8
Workington Town	9

Final
Widnes	15
Workington Town	13

== Notes and comments ==
1 * Central Park was the home ground of Wigan with a final capacity of 18,000, although the record attendance was 47,747 for Wigan v St Helens 27 March 1959

== See also ==
- 1978–79 Northern Rugby Football League season
- Rugby league county cups
