= Raymond Wilkins (rugby) =

Wales international rugby league footballer

Ray Wilkins
Personal information
- Full name: Raymond Wilkins
- Born: 3 October 1950 (age 75) Neath, Wales

Playing information

Rugby union
Club
Years	Team	Pld	T	G	FG	P
1969–71	Aberavon RFC

Rugby league
- Position: Fullback
Club
Years	Team	Pld	T	G	FG	P
1971–82	Workington Town
Representative
Years	Team	Pld	T	G	FG	P
1974	Other Nationalities	3	0	6	0	12
1977	Wales	2

Raymond "Ray" Wilkins (born 3 October 1950) is a Welsh former professional rugby footballer who played in the 1960s, 1970s and 1980s. He played rugby union for Aberavon RFC and rugby league for Workington Town and Wales, as a fullback.

== Background ==
Ray Wilkins was born in Neath, Wales.

== Playing career ==
=== International honours ===
Ray Wilkins won a cap for Wales (RU) at under-15 in 1965, was captain in 1966, and won an under-19 cap in 1969, and won 2 caps for Wales (RL) in 1977 while at Workington Town.

=== County Cup Final appearances ===
Ray Wilkins played at centre, and scored a try in Workington Town's 11–16 defeat by Widnes in the 1976 Lancashire Cup Final during the 1976–77 season at Central Park, Wigan on Saturday 30 October 1976, played stand-off, and scored a try in the 16–13 victory over Wigan in the 1977 Lancashire Cup Final during the 1977–78 season at Wilderspool Stadium, Warrington on Saturday 29 October 1977, and played at centre, and scored a try in the 13–15 defeat by Widnes in the 1978 Lancashire Cup Final during the 1978–79 season at Central Park, Wigan on Saturday 7 October 1978.
