= Mick George =

English rugby league footballer

Personal information
- Full name: Derek Michael George
- Born: c. 1950

Playing information
- Position: Centre
Club
Years	Team	Pld	T	G	FG	P
1971–82	Widnes	296	108	0	1	325
Representative
Years	Team	Pld	T	G	FG	P
1975–81	Lancashire	4	0	0	0	0

Derek Michael George is an English former rugby league footballer who played as a centre. He played nearly 300 games for Widnes between 1971 and 1982, winning three Challenge Cup medals with the club.

== Playing career ==
George made his first team debut for Widnes in 1971 after some impressive performances for the 'A' team. He earned a regular place in the first team the following year after scoring two tries in a league game against Wakefield Trinity.

George played for Widnes during a successful era, and won five Lancashire Cups with the club (1974–75, 1975–76, 1976–77, 1978–79 and 1979–80), one John Player Trophy in 1975–76, and one Premiership in 1979–80. He also helped Widnes win the league championship in 1977–78.

George played for the club at Wembley in four Challenge Cup finals (1974–75, 1975–76, 1978–79 and 1980–81), winning three of them, and most notably scoring a try in the 1981 final against Hull Kingston Rovers.

George was granted a testimonial by Widnes in August 1981. He missed the second half of the 1981–82 season after suffering a torn knee ligament during an 'A' team game, and announced his retirement a year later after failing to fully recover from the injury.
