= Harry Beverley (rugby league, born 1947) =

England international rugby league footballer (1947–2022)

Personal information
- Full name: Harry Glenn Beverley
- Born: 11 April 1947; Leeds, West Riding of Yorkshire, England
- Died: 29 March 2022 (aged 74)

Playing information
- Position: Prop
Club
Years	Team	Pld	T	G	FG	P
1971–77	Dewsbury
1977–80	Workington Town
1980–84	Fulham RLFC	106	3	0	0	9
1984–84	Carlisle
1984–86	Workington Town
	Total	106	3	0	0	9
Representative
Years	Team	Pld	T	G	FG	P
1975–79	Yorkshire	4	0	0	0	0
1975–79	England	2	0	0	0	0

Harry Glenn Beverley (11 April 1947 – 29 March 2022) was an English professional rugby league footballer who played in the 1970s and 1980s. He played at representative level for England and Yorkshire, and at club level for Dewsbury, Workington Town (two spells), Carlisle and Fulham RLFC, as a prop

== Background ==
Beverley was born in Leeds, West Riding of Yorkshire, England. He died on 29 March 2022, aged 74.

== Playing career ==
Beverley's professional career began in 1971 when he joined Dewsbury. Two years later Beverley played prop in Dewsbury's 22–13 victory over Leeds in the Championship Final during the 1972–73 season at Odsal Stadium, Bradford on Saturday 19 May 1973. Another final appearance was in the 22–2 defeat by St. Helens in the 1975 BBC2 Floodlit Trophy Final at Knowsley Road, St. Helens on Tuesday 16 December 1975.

After six seasons with Dewsbury, Beverley joined Workington in 1978 and played in two Lancashire Cup finals, ending up on the losing side both times. Workington lost 13–15 to Widnes in the 1978–79 Lancashire Cup Final at Central Park, Wigan on Saturday 7 October 1978 and again lost to Widnes the following year 0–11 at The Willows, Salford on Saturday 8 December 1979.

In September 1980, Beverley was signed by Fulham RLFC for a fee of £20,000, becoming a member of the team in their inaugural season. He spent four seasons in London before returning to Cumbria. After a short spell with Carlisle, he ended his career with another year at Workington, retiring in 1986.

=== International and representative honours ===
Beverley made four appearances for Yorkshire in the County Championship.

Two international caps for England came his way. The first while at Dewsbury when he played prop in England's 0–25 defeat by Australia in the 1975 Rugby League World Cup Final at Headingley, Leeds on 12 November 1975. The second was in 1979 in the 15–7 victory over Wales during the 1979 European Rugby League Championship.
