= Les Gorley =

Great Britain and England international rugby league footballer (1950–2019)

Personal information
- Full name: Leslie Gorley
- Born: 3 July 1950 Great Broughton, England
- Died: 11 September 2019 (aged 69)

Playing information
- Position: Second-row
Club
| Years | Team | Pld | T | G | FG | P |
|---|---|---|---|---|---|---|
| 1970–79 | Workington Town | 224 | 50 | 2 | 0 | 154 |
| 1979–84 | Widnes | 164 | 23 | 0 | 0 | 92 |
| 1984–86 | Whitehaven | 47 | 8 | 0 | 0 | 32 |
| | Total | 435 | 81 | 2 | 0 | 278 |
Representative
| Years | Team | Pld | T | G | FG | P |
| 1973 | Cumberland | 1 | 0 | 0 | 0 | 0 |
| 1973–81 | Cumbria | 15 | 3 | 0 | 0 | 9 |
| 1977–81 | England | 2 | 0 | 0 | 0 | 0 |
| 1980–82 | Great Britain | 5 | 0 | 0 | 0 | 0 |
- Relatives: Peter Gorley (brother)

Leslie Gorley (3 July 1950 – 11 September 2019) was an English former professional rugby league footballer who played in the 1970s and 1980s. He played at representative level for Great Britain, England and Cumbria, and at club level for Workington Town, Widnes and Whitehaven as a second-row forward.

== Background ==
Gorley was born in Great Broughton, Cumberland, England in 1950.

== Playing career ==
=== Workington Town ===
Gorley played right-second-row in Workington Town's 11–16 defeat by Widnes in the 1976 Lancashire Cup Final during the 1976–77 season at Central Park, Wigan on Saturday 30 October 1976, played left-second-row in the 13–10 victory over Wigan in the 1977 Final during the 1977–78 season at Wilderspool Stadium, Warrington on Saturday 29 October 1977, and appeared as a substitute (replacing Loose forward William Pattinson) and scored a try in the 13–15 defeat by Widnes in the 1978 Lancashire Cup Final during the 1978–79 season at Central Park, Wigan on Saturday 7 October 1978.

=== Widnes ===
Gorley was signed by Widnes in 1979 for a fee of £18,000. He played left-second-row in Widnes 11–0 victory over Workington Town in the 1979 Lancashire Cup Final during the 1979–80 season at The Willows, Salford on Saturday 8 December 1979, and played left-second-row in the 3–8 defeat by Leigh in the 1981 Lancashire Cup Final during the 1981–82 season at Central Park, Wigan on Saturday 26 September 1981.

Gorley played left-second-row in Widnes' 0–6 defeat by Bradford Northern in the 1979–80 John Player Trophy Final during the 1979–80 season at Headingley, Leeds on Saturday 5 January 1980, and played left-second-row in the 10–18 defeat by Leeds in the 1983–84 John Player Special Trophy Final during the 1983–84 season at Central Park, Wigan on Saturday 14 January 1984.

Gorley appeared in five Challenge Cup Finals with Widnes, he played left-second-row in Widnes' 18–9 victory over Hull Kingston Rovers in the 1981 Challenge Cup Final during the 1980–81 season at Wembley Stadium, London on Saturday 2 May 1981, in front of a crowd of 92,496, played left-second-row in the 14–14 draw with Hull F.C. in the 1982 Challenge Cup Final during the 1981–82 season at Wembley Stadium, London on Saturday 1 May 1982, in front of a crowd of 92,147, played left-second-row in the 9–18 defeat by Hull F.C. in the 1982 Challenge Cup Final replay during the 1981–82 season at Elland Road, Leeds on Wednesday 19 May 1982, in front of a crowd of 41,171, and played left-second-row in the 19–6 victory over Wigan in the 1984 Challenge Cup Final during the 1983–84 season at Wembley Stadium, London on Saturday 5 May 1984, in front of a crowd of 80,116.

=== Representative honours ===
Gorley won caps for England while at Workington in 1977 against Wales, while at Widnes in 1981 against Wales (sub), and won caps for Great Britain while at Widnes in 1980 against New Zealand, and New Zealand (sub), in 1981 against France (2 matches), and in 1982 against Australia.

Gorley also represented Cumbria, helping the team win the County championship in 1980–81 and 1981–82.

== Personal life ==
Gorley was the elder brother of the rugby league footballer; Peter Gorley.
