= Mal Aspey =

English rugby league footballer

Personal information
- Full name: Malcolm Aspey
- Born: 26 April 1947 (age 79) Prescot, Lancashire, England

Playing information
- Position: Centre
Club
Years	Team	Pld	T	G	FG	P
1964–80	Widnes	575	236	125	0	958
1980–82	Fulham RLFC	34+6	19	0	0	57
1982	Wigan	15+2	1	0	0	3
1982–83	Salford	20+3	3	0	0	9
	Total	655	259	125	0	1027

Coaching information
Club
Years	Team	Gms	W	D	L	W%
1982–83	Salford	47	29	0	18	62

Malcolm Aspey (born 26 April 1947) is an English former professional rugby league footballer who played in the 1960s, 1970s and 1980s, and coached in the 1980s. He played at club level for Fulham RLFC, Wigan, and Salford, as a centre, and coached at club level for Salford.

== Background ==
Aspey's birth was registered in Prescot district, Lancashire, England.

== Playing career ==
=== Premiership Final appearances ===
Aspey played, and was man of the match winning the Harry Sunderland Trophy in Widnes' 26-11 victory over Bradford Northern in the Premiership Final during the 1979–80 season at Station Road, Swinton on Saturday 17 May 1980.

=== Challenge Cup Final appearances ===
Aspey played left-centre in Widnes' 14-7 victory over Warrington in the 1974–75 Challenge Cup Final during the 1974–75 season at Wembley Stadium, London on Saturday 10 May 1975, played right-centre and scored a try in the 7-16 defeat by Leeds in the 1976–77 Challenge Cup Final during the 1976–77 season at Wembley Stadium on Saturday 7 May 1977, and played right-centre, in the 12-3 victory over Wakefield Trinity in the 1978–79 Challenge Cup Final during the 1978–79 season at Wembley Stadium on Saturday 5 May 1979.

=== County Cup Final appearances ===
Aspey played left-centre and scored a goal in Widnes' 8-15 defeat by Wigan in the 1971–72 Lancashire Cup Final during the 1970–71 season at Knowsley Road, St. Helens, on Saturday 28 August 1971, played left-centre in the 6-2 victory over Salford in the 1974–75 Lancashire County Cup Final during the 1974–75 season at Central Park, Wigan on Saturday 2 November 1974, played left-centre and scored a try in the 16-7 victory over Salford in the 1975–76 Lancashire County Cup Final during the 1975–76 season at Central Park on Saturday 4 October 1975, played right-centre in the 16-11 victory over Workington Town in the 1976–77 Lancashire County Cup Final during the 1976–77 season at Central Park on Saturday 30 October 1976, played right-centre in the 15-13 victory over Workington Town in the 1978–79 Lancashire County Cup Final during the 1978–79 season at Central Park on Saturday 7 October 1978, and played right-centre in the 11-0 victory over Workington Town in the 1979–80 Lancashire County Cup Final during the 1979–80 season at The Willows, Salford on Saturday 8 December 1979.

=== BBC2 Floodlit Trophy Final appearances ===
Aspey played left-centre in Widnes' 0-5 defeat by Leigh in the 1972 BBC2 Floodlit Trophy Final during the 1972–73 season at Central Park on Tuesday 19 December 1972, played left-centre in the 7-15 defeat by Bramley in the 1973 BBC2 Floodlit Trophy Final during the 1973–74 season at Naughton Park, Widnes on Tuesday 18 December 1973, and played left-centre in the 13-7 victory over St. Helens in the 1978 BBC2 Floodlit Trophy Final during the 1978–79 season at Knowsley Road on Tuesday 12 December 1978.

=== Player's No.6 Trophy/John Player Trophy Final appearances ===
Aspey played left-centre in Widnes' 2-3 defeat by Bradford Northern in the 1974–75 Player's No.6 Trophy Final during the 1974–75 season at Wilderspool Stadium, Warrington, on Saturday 25 January 1975, played left-centre in the 19-13 victory over Hull F.C. in the 1975–76 Player's No.6 Trophy Final during the 1975–76 season at Headingley Rugby Stadium, Leeds, on Saturday 24 January 1976, played right-centre in the 4-9 defeat by Warrington in the 1977–78 Player's No.6 Trophy Final during the 1977–78 season at Knowsley Road on Saturday 28 January 1978, played right-centre in the 16-4 victory over Warrington in the 1978–79 John Player Trophy Final during the 1978–79 season at Knowsley Road on Saturday 28 April 1979, and played right-centre in the 0-6 defeat by Bradford Northern in the 1979–80 John Player Trophy Final during the 1979–80 season at Headingley on Saturday 5 January 1980.

=== Career records ===
Aspey holds Widnes' "Most Tries In A Career" record with 236 tries, and with 575-appearances, he is second behind Keith Elwell (594 appearances) in Widnes' "Most Appearances In A Career" record list.

== Post playing ==
Aspey was the landlord of Ye Olde Chequers Inn pub in Tonbridge, Kent. As of 2019 he is retired and living in Widnes, Cheshire.

== Genealogical information ==
Aspey is the grandson of Sam Aspey, the rugby league footballer who played in the 1900s and 1910s for Widnes, and the great-nephew of Sam Aspey's brothers. The elder brother, George Aspey, played in the 1890s, 1900s and 1910s for Widnes and the younger, "Bill" Aspey, played in the 1900s for Widnes.
