= Green Vigo =

South African rugby footballer (1950–2026)

Personal information
- Full name: Green Gregory Vigo
- Born: 21 April 1950 Saldanha Bay, Cape Province, South Africa
- Died: 14 February 2026 (aged 75) Manchester, England

Playing information

Rugby union
- Position: Centre
Club
Years	Team	Pld	T	G	FG	P
	Saldanha Tigers
Representative
Years	Team	Pld	T	G	FG	P
	Proteas

Rugby league
- Position: Wing
Club
Years	Team	Pld	T	G	FG	P
1973–80	Wigan	168	86	1	0	260
1980–82	Swinton	52	28	0	0	84
1982–85	Oldham	63	20	0	0	73
	Total	283	134	1	0	417
Representative
Years	Team	Pld	T	G	FG	P
1974–75	Other Nationalities	5	2	0	0	6

Green Gregory Vigo (21 April 1950 – 14 February 2026) was a South African rugby union and rugby league footballer who played in the 1970s and 1980s. He played representative level rugby union (RU) for Proteas, and at club level for Saldanha Tigers, as a centre, and representative level rugby league (RL) for Other Nationalities, and at club level for Wigan, Swinton and Oldham, as a wing.

== Rugby union ==
Vigo started his career in rugby union, playing for Saldanha Tigers. He also represented the Proteas in their 1972 tour to the United Kingdom, playing as a centre.

== Rugby league ==
In 1973, Vigo switched codes from rugby union to rugby league when he joined the English rugby league club; Wigan. Vigo played 168 first team games for Wigan, scoring 86 tries, before being sold to Swinton in 1980 for a fee of £15,000. Vigo also went on to play for Oldham.

Vigo played right wing in Wigan's 19–9 victory over Salford in the 1973–74 Lancashire Cup Final during the 1973–74 season at Wilderspool Stadium, Warrington, on Saturday 13 October 1973, and played right wing in the 13–16 defeat by Workington Town in the 1977–78 Lancashire Cup Final during the 1977–78 season at Wilderspool Stadium, Warrington, on Saturday 29 October 1977.

In August 1976, Vigo scored seven tries in a 37–5 win against St Helens in the Lancashire Cup, a record for most tries scored in a derby match between Wigan and St Helens.

At representative level, he appeared for the Other Nationalities rugby league team while at Wigan.

In June 1978, he was named in the inaugural Open Rugby World XIII.

== Death ==
Vigo died on 14 February 2026, at the age of 75.
