= Eric Hughes (rugby, born 1950) =

English rugby league coach and footballer

Personal information
- Full name: Eric Hughes
- Born: 17 October 1950 (age 75) Widnes, England

Playing information
- Height: 6 ft 0 in (1.83 m)
- Weight: 13 st 0 lb (83 kg)
- Position: Wing, Centre, Stand-off
Club
Years	Team	Pld	T	G	FG	P
1969–84	Widnes	481	199	0	1	607
1976	Canterbury-Bankstown	14	5	0	0	15
1985–86	St Helens	13	1	0	0	4
1986–87	Rochdale Hornets	9	1	0	0	4
	Total	517	206	0	1	630
Representative
Years	Team	Pld	T	G	FG	P
1975–79	England	10	8	0	0	24
1978–82	Great Britain	8	0	0	0	0
1972–79	Lancashire	12	5	0	0	15

Coaching information
Club
Years	Team	Gms	W	D	L	W%
1984–85	Widnes	61	35	3	23	57
1987–88	Rochdale Hornets	32	11	0	21	34
1994–96	St Helens	78	45	3	30	58
1996	Leigh	17	9	0	8	53
1997	Wigan Warriors	33	19	0	14	58
	Total	221	119	6	96	54

Eric Hughes (born 17 October 1950) is a retired English professional rugby league footballer who played in the 1960s, 1970s and 1980s, and coached rugby league in the 1980s and 1990s. He played representative level rugby league for Great Britain and England, and at club level for Widnes, Canterbury-Bankstown Bulldogs, St Helens and the Rochdale Hornets, as a wing, centre or stand-off, and coached at club level for Widnes, Rochdale Hornets, St Helens, Leigh and Wigan Warriors. He unwittingly added confusion to the Canterbury-Bankstown Bulldogs team as he was unrelated but played at the same time as the three Australian brothers named Hughes; Garry, Graeme and Mark.

== Background ==
Born in Widnes, he was a pupil at Wade Deacon Grammar School. Hughes played rugby union when growing up, and was selected to play for England at under-15's level.

He was later an English language teacher at Bankfield School, Widnes, and he was the landlord of The Lion public house, Moulton, Cheshire. His older brother Arthur also played rugby league, winning the challenge cup final with Widnes in 1964.

== Playing career ==
=== Challenge Cup Final appearances ===
Hughes played stand-off in Widnes' 14–7 victory over Warrington in the 1975 Challenge Cup Final during the 1974–75 season at Wembley Stadium, London on Saturday 10 May 1975, in front of a crowd of 85,998, played at centre in the 5–20 defeat by St. Helens in the 1976 Challenge Cup Final during the 1975–76 season at Wembley Stadium, London on Saturday 8 May 1976, in front of a crowd of 89,982, played stand-off in the 7–16 defeat by Leeds in the 1977 Challenge Cup Final during the 1976–77 at Wembley Stadium, London on Saturday 7 May 1977, in front of a crowd of 80,871, played stand-off in the 12–3 victory over Wakefield Trinity in the 1979 Challenge Cup Final during the 1978–79 season at Wembley Stadium, London on Saturday 5 May 1979, in front of a crowd of 94,218, the 18–9 victory over Hull Kingston Rovers in the 1981 Challenge Cup Final during the 1980–81 season at Wembley Stadium, London on Saturday 2 May 1981, in front of a crowd of 92,496, played stand-off in the 14–14 draw with Hull F.C. in the 1982 Challenge Cup Final during the 1981–82 season at Wembley Stadium, London on Saturday 1 May 1982, in front of a crowd of 92,147, played stand-off in the 9–18 defeat by Hull F.C. in the 1982 Challenge Cup Final replay during the 1981–82 season at Elland Road, Leeds on Wednesday 19 May 1982, in front of a crowd of 41,171, and played stand-off the 19–6 victory over Wigan in the 1984 Challenge Cup Final during the 1983–84 season at Wembley Stadium, London on Saturday 5 May 1984, in front of a crowd of 80,116.

=== County Cup Final appearances ===
Hughes played stand-off, and scored a drop goal in Widnes' 6–2 victory over Salford in the 1974 Lancashire Cup Final during the 1974–75 season at Central Park, Wigan on Saturday 2 November 1974, played stand-off in the 16–7 victory over Salford in the 1975 Lancashire Cup Final during the 1975–76 season at Central Park, Wigan on Saturday 4 October 1975, played stand-off in the 15–13 victory over Workington Town in the 1978 Lancashire Cup Final during the 1978–79 season at Central Park, Wigan on Saturday 7 October 1978, played at centre in the 11–0 victory over Workington Town in the 1979 Lancashire Cup Final during the 1979–80 season at The Willows, Salford on Saturday 8 December 1979, played at centre in the 3–8 defeat by Leigh in the 1981 Lancashire Cup Final during the 1981–82 season at Central Park, Wigan on Saturday 26 September 1981, and played at centre in the 8–12 defeat by Barrow in the 1983 Lancashire Cup Final during the 1983–84 season at Central Park, Wigan on Saturday 1 October 1983.

=== BBC2 Floodlit Trophy Final appearances ===
Hughes played at centre in the 7–15 defeat by Bramley in the 1973 BBC2 Floodlit Trophy Final during the 1973–74 season at Naughton Park, Widnes on Tuesday 18 December 1973, and played at centre in the 13–7 victory over St Helens in the 1978 BBC2 Floodlit Trophy Final during the 1978–79 season at Knowsley Road, St. Helens on Tuesday 12 December 1978.

=== Player's No.6 Trophy/John Player/John Player Special Trophy Final appearances ===
Hughes played stand-off in Widnes' 2–3 defeat by Bradford Northern in the 1974–75 Player's No.6 Trophy Final during the 1974–75 season at Wilderspool Stadium, Warrington on Saturday 25 January 1975, played stand-off in the 19–13 victory over Hull F.C. in the 1975–76 Player's No.6 Trophy Final during the 1975–76 season at Headingley, Leeds on Saturday 24 January 1976, played at centre in the 4–9 defeat by Warrington in the 1977–78 Players No.6 Trophy Final during the 1977–78 season at Knowsley Road, St. Helens on Saturday 28 January 1978, played stand-off in the 16–4 victory over Warrington in the 1978–79 John Player Trophy Final during the 1978–79 season at Knowsley Road, St. Helens on Saturday 28 April 1979, played stand-off in the 0–6 defeat by Bradford Northern in the 1979–80 John Player Trophy Final during the 1979–80 season at Headingley, Leeds on Saturday 5 January 1980, and played stand-off in the 10–18 defeat by Leeds in the 1983–84 John Player Special Trophy Final during the 1983–84 season at Central Park, Wigan on Saturday 14 January 1984.

=== International honours ===
Hughes won caps for England while at Widnes in the 1975 Rugby League World Cup against Wales, France, New Zealand, Australia (sub), Australia, in 1977 against France, in 1978 against France, and Wales, and in 1979 against Wales, and France.

He won eight caps for Great Britain, with his first coming in 1978 against Australia. The following year, he was selected for the 1979 Great Britain Lions tour, appearing in every Test against Australia and New Zealand. He made one further appearance in 1982 against Australia.

== Coaching career ==
Hughes coached Widnes from 1984 to 1985. He resigned following the unforeseen transfer of Joe Lydon to Wigan to alleviate Widnes' financial difficulties, following an approach from Alex Murphy. He returned to playing rugby league signing with St. Helens, and played in 13-matches for St. Helens, winning the first twelve, and then losing the thirteenth, scoring a try in a 22–38 defeat by Leeds in the 1985–86 Rugby League Premiership 1st-round match during the 1985–86 season at Knowsley Road, St. Helens on Sunday 27 April 1986. He coached Rochdale Hornets for the 1987–88 season. He was appointed as coach at St. Helens in January 1994 until January 1996, when he was replaced by Shaun McRae. He was appointed head coach at Leigh, but left the club in October 1996 to join Wigan as an academy coach. In February 1997, he was promoted to become Wigan's head coach following the departure of Graeme West. He was replaced nine months later by John Monie. He returned to St Helens as a football operations manager in 1998, a role he served in for three and a half years before stepping down at the end of the 2001 season.

Hughes also coached in rugby union at Liverpool St Helens F.C..
