= John Risman =

Former RL coach and Wales international rugby league footballer

Personal information
- Full name: John V. Risman
- Born: fourth ¼ 1944 (age 80–81); Salford, England

Playing information
- Position: Fullback, Centre
Club
Years	Team	Pld	T	G	FG	P
1970–80	Workington Town	222	41	0	0	123
1980–81	Fulham	20	3	0	0	9
1981	Blackpool Borough	14	1	0	0	3
1981–84	Carlisle	41	4	0	0	15
	Total	297	49	0	0	150
Representative
Years	Team	Pld	T	G	FG	P
1978–79	Wales	3	0	0	0	0

Coaching information
Representative
Years	Team	Gms	W	D	L	W%
2004	Serbia	3	0	1	2	0
- Father: Gus Risman
- Relatives: Bev Risman (brother)

John V. Risman (birth registered fourth ¼ 1944) is the President of Scotland Rugby League and a former professional rugby league footballer who played in the 1970s and 1980s. He played at representative level for Wales, and at club level for Workington Town, Fulham, Blackpool Borough and Carlisle, as a fullback or centre, he was coach of Scotland Students RL for the 1996 University Rugby League World Cup.

== Background ==
John Risman's birth was registered in Salford district, Lancashire, in the early 1980s, John Risman was a teacher of Geography and Physical education at Salterbeck School in Workington.

== Playing career ==
=== International honours ===
John Risman won 3 caps for Wales in 1978–1979 while at Workington Town.

=== County Cup Final appearances ===
John Risman played at centre in Workington Town's 16-13 victory over Wigan in the 1977 Lancashire Cup Final during the 1977–78 season at Wilderspool Stadium, Warrington on Saturday 29 October 1977, and played at centre in the 13-15 defeat by Widnes in the 1978 Lancashire Cup Final during the 1978–79 season at Central Park, Wigan on Saturday 7 October 1978.

== Coaching ==
John coached the Serbia national rugby league team for 3 matches in the 2004 Mediterranean Cup; losing to Lebanon and France, but getting a 20-20 draw with Morocco

== Genealogical information ==
John Risman is the son of the rugby league footballer Gus Risman, and the younger brother of the rugby union, and rugby league footballer Bev Risman.
