= Glyn Shaw =

Welsh dual-code rugby footballer (1951–2022)

Personal information
- Full name: Glyndwr Shaw
- Born: 11 April 1951 Rhigos, Glamorgan, Wales
- Died: 10 May 2022 (aged 71)

Playing information
- Height: 6 ft 2 in (188 cm)
- Weight: 15 st 2 lb (96 kg)

Rugby union
- Position: Prop
Club
Years	Team	Pld	T	G	FG	P
1970–77	Neath RFC
Representative
Years	Team	Pld	T	G	FG	P
1972–77	Wales	12	0	0	0	0

Rugby league
- Position: Prop, Second-row
Club
Years	Team	Pld	T	G	FG	P
1978–81	Widnes	140	18	0	0	54
1981–84	Wigan	63	2	0	0	6
1984–85	Warrington	21	3	0	0	12
1985–86	Rochdale Hornets	8	1	0	0	3
	Total	232	24	0	0	75
Representative
Years	Team	Pld	T	G	FG	P
1978–84	Wales	7	0	0	0	0
1980	Great Britain	1	0	0	0	0

Glyndwr Shaw (11 April 1951 – 10 May 2022) was a Welsh dual-code international rugby union, and rugby league footballer who played in the 1970s and 1980s. He played representative level rugby union for Wales, and at club level for Neath RFC, as a prop and representative level rugby league for Great Britain and Wales, and at club level for Widnes, Wigan, Warrington and Rochdale Hornets, as a prop, or second-row.

== Background ==
Shaw was born in Rhigos, Wales.

== Playing career ==
=== Rugby Union ===
Shaw started his career at seven sisters RFC in the Dulais valley at junior and youth level. Shaw first appeared for Neath in 1970 and in 1972 he won his first caps for Wales in 1972 against New Zealand. A further 11 caps followed, in 1973 against England, Scotland, Ireland, France, and Australia, in 1974 against Scotland, Ireland, France, and England, and in 1977 against Ireland, and France. In 1972 he was a member of Neath squad that won the inaugural WRU Challenge Cup beating Llanelli 15–9.

=== Rugby League ===
Despite being appointed captain at Neath in 1977, Shaw changed codes and signed for rugby league side Widnes in November of the same year. He made his début for Widnes in a midweek evening match against New Hunslet at the Leeds Greyhound Stadium on Elland Road, Leeds, where he entertained the crowd even before taking to the pitch, by doing "one arm pressups" during his warm up. Almost immediately he was selected for the won caps for Welsh national team against France and Australia in 1978. Further caps for Wales followed in 1980 against France, and England, in 1981 against England, in 1982 against Australia, and in 1984 against England. In 1980 he was chosen to play for Great Britain against New Zealand. During his four seasons at Widnes, Shaw appeared in two Challenge Cup finals. The first in the 12–3 victory over Wakefield Trinity in the 1978–79 Challenge Cup Final at Wembley Stadium, London on Saturday 5 May 1979, and two years later he was a substitute in the 18-9 victory over Hull Kingston Rovers in the 1980–81 Challenge Cup Final at Wembley Stadium on Saturday 2 May 1981.

Two County Cup final victories also appeared in Shaw's record: at right-prop in Widnes' 15-13 victory over Workington Town in the 1978 Lancashire Cup Final at Central Park, Wigan on Saturday 7 October 1978, and played right-prop in the 11-0 victory over Workington Town in the 1979 Lancashire Cup Final at The Willows, Salford on Saturday 8 December 1979.

Three losing Player's Trophy finals also featured during his time at Widnes. Shaw played right-prop in Widnes' 4-9 defeat by Warrington in the 1977–78 Players No.6 Trophy Final at Knowsley Road, St. Helens on Saturday 28 January 1978, played right-prop in the 16-4 victory over Warrington in the 1978–79 John Player Trophy Final at Knowsley Road, on Saturday 28 April 1979, played right-prop in the 0-6 defeat by Bradford Northern in the 1979–80 John Player Trophy Final at Headingley Rugby Stadium, Leeds on Saturday 5 January 1980.

In November 1981, Shaw left Widnes for Wigan for a transfer fee of £25,000. The only major final he played for Wigan was at left-prop in Wigan's 15-4 victory over Leeds in the 1982–83 John Player Trophy Final at Elland Road, Leeds on Saturday 22 January 1983.

In November 1984 Shaw left Wigan for Warrington for whom he played until November the following year. A transfer to Rochdale Hornets followed but after only eight appearances for the Hornets he retired early in 1986.

== Personal life ==
Glyn Shaw had two children, a son and a daughter, by his first marriage to Linda plus two daughters by his second marriage to Janie. Shaw died, aged 71, on 10 May 2022.
