= Brian Hogan (rugby league) =

English rugby league footballer (1947–2022)

Personal information
- Full name: John Brian Hogan
- Born: 10 December 1947
- Died: 26 November 2022 (aged 74)

Playing information
- Height: 6 ft 2 in (1.88 m)
- Weight: 16 st 0 lb (102 kg)
- Position: Prop, second-row
Club
Years	Team	Pld	T	G	FG	P
1964–68	St. Helens	53	6	0	0	18
1968–72	Wigan	121	10	0	0	30
1972–73	Bradford Northern	16	0	0	0	0
1973–74	Widnes	27	1	0	0	3
1974–78	Wigan	86	9	0	0	27
1978–82	Widnes	99	9	0	0	27
1982–83	Oldham	34	3	0	0	9
	Total	436	38	0	0	114
Representative
Years	Team	Pld	T	G	FG	P
1971–75	Lancashire	4	0	0	0	0
1975–77	England	5	1	0	0	3

John Brian Hogan (10 December 1947 – 27 November 2022) was an English professional rugby league footballer who played in the 1960s, 1970s and 1980s. He played at representative level for England and Lancashire, and at club level for St. Helens, Wigan (two spells), Workington Town, Bradford Northern, Widnes (three spells), and Oldham, as a prop, or second-row.

== Playing career ==
=== St Helens ===
Hogan made his debut for St. Helens in the 21–9 victory over Blackpool Borough in the Championship match during the 1965–66 season at Knowsley Roa on Friday 17 December 1965, and he played his last match for St. Helens in the 4–7 defeat by Wigan in the 1968–69 BBC2 Floodlit Trophy Final at Central Park, Wigan on Tuesday 17 December 1968.

Hogan played left-second-row in St. Helens' 2–2 draw with Warrington in the 1967 Lancashire Cup Final at Station Road, Swinton on Saturday 7 October 1967 (he was replaced by Eric Chisnall in the replay), was an interchange/substitute in the 30–2 victory over Oldham in the 1968 Lancashire Cup Final at Central Park, Wigan on Friday 25 October 1968.

Hogan played right-second-row in St. Helens' 4–7 defeat by Wigan in the 1968 BBC2 Floodlit Trophy Final at Central Park, Wigan on Tuesday 16 December 1968.

Hogan was an interchange/substitute in St. Helens' 8–4 victory over Australia at Knowsley Road, St. Helens on Tuesday 24 October 1967.

=== Wigan ===
Hogan made his debut for Wigan in the 14–2 victory over Workington Town at Central Park, Wigan on Saturday 21 December 1968. He played his last match in his second period with Wigan in the 21–15 victory over Castleford at Central Park, Wigan on Sunday 22 January 1978.

Hogan played in Wigan's victory in the Lancashire League during the 1969–70 season.

He played left-prop in Wigan's 13–16 defeat by Workington Town in the 1977 Lancashire Cup Final at Wilderspool Stadium, Warrington on Saturday 29 October 1977.

=== Bradford Northern ===
Hogan played left-prop in Bradford Northern's 14–33 defeat by Featherstone Rovers in the 1973 Challenge Cup Final at Wembley Stadium, London on Saturday 12 May 1973, in front of a crowd of 72,395.

=== Widnes ===
Hogan played left-prop in Widnes' 7–15 defeat by Bramley in the 1973 BBC2 Floodlit Trophy Final at Naughton Park, Widnes on Tuesday 18 December 1973, and played left-prop in the 13–7 victory over St. Helens in the 1978 BBC2 Floodlit Trophy Final at Knowsley Road, St. Helens on Tuesday 12 December 1978.

He played right-prop in Widnes' 11–0 victory over Workington Town in the 1979 Lancashire Cup Final at The Willows, Salford on Saturday 8 December 1979.

=== International honours ===
Hogan won caps for England while at Wigan in the 1975 Rugby League World Cup against Wales, France, New Zealand and Australia, and in 1977 against Wales.

== Personal life ==
Hogan died on 27 November 2022, at the age of 74.
