= Steve Davies (rugby league) =

Australian rugby league footballer

Personal information
- Full name: Stephen Davies
- Born: 21 July 1959 (age 66) Campsie, New South Wales, Australia

Playing information
- Position: Centre, Right wing
Club
Years	Team	Pld	T	G	FG	P
1975–84	Parramatta Eels	4	2	0	0	6
1984–85	Penrith Panthers	5	0	0	0	8
	Total	9	2	0	0	14
- Source: As of 21 February 2020

Stephen Davies (born July 21, 1959) is a former professional rugby league footballer who played in the 1970s and 1980s. He played at club level for both the Parramatta Eels and Penrith Panthers.

== Playing career ==
Stephen Davies played Right wing, Centre, number 2. He made his debut in 1976 with Terry Fernley's under 23’s Parramatta side whilst playing school boy football with Ashcroft High School. Stephen scored 44 tries that season as a sixteen year old.

=== Coaching career ===
Stephen Davies coached a successful, all conquering Ashcroft High School side from 1978 - 1985.
