= Stuart Wright (rugby league) =

Great Britain and England international rugby league footballer

Personal information
- Full name: Stuart Wright
- Born: 19 March 1950 (age 76) Stockton Heath, Warrington, England

Playing information
- Height: 6 ft 1 in (1.85 m)
- Weight: 12 st 12 lb (82 kg)
- Position: Wing
Club
Years	Team	Pld	T	G	FG	P
1969–76	Wigan	173	103	0	0	309
1976–87	Widnes	263	151	0	0	464
	Total	436	254	0	0	773
Representative
Years	Team	Pld	T	G	FG	P
1970–78	Lancashire	10	7	0	0	21
1975–80	England	7	5	0	0	15
1977–78	Great Britain	7	5	0	0	15

Stuart Wright (born 19 March 1950) is an English former professional rugby league footballer who played in the 1960s, 1970s and 1980s. He played at representative level for Great Britain, England and Lancashire, and at club level for Wigan and Widnes, as a wing.

== Playing career ==
=== Wigan ===
Wright joined Wigan in 1969 from Warrington-based junior club, Latchford Albion.

Wright played right wing in Wigan's 6-11 defeat by Leigh in the 1969 BBC2 Floodlit Trophy Final during the 1969–70 season at Central Park, Wigan on Tuesday 16 December 1969.

Wright played left wing (replaced by substitute Dave Gandy) in Wigan's 15-8 victory over Widnes in the 1971 Lancashire Cup Final during the 1971–72 season at Knowsley Road, St Helens on Saturday 28 August 1971, and played left wing, and scored a try in the 19-9 victory over Salford in the 1973 Lancashire Cup Final during the 1973–74 season at Wilderspool Stadium, Warrington on Saturday 13 October 1973.

=== Widnes ===
Wright transferred from Wigan to Widnes in August 1976.

Wright played right wing, and scored a try in Widnes' 12-3 victory over Wakefield Trinity in the 1979 Challenge Cup Final during the 1978–79 season at Wembley Stadium, London on Saturday 5 May 1979, in front of a crowd of 94,218. Receiving the ball well within his own half of the field, Stuart cut through the first line of the Wakefield Trinity defence, before chipping the ball over the second line of defenders and outpacing them to regather the ball and score in the corner, a video of the try is available on YouTube: Stuart Wright's try at Wembley 1979. He also played right wing in the 18-9 victory over Hull Kingston Rovers in the 1981 Challenge Cup Final during the 1980–81 season at Wembley Stadium, London on Saturday 2 May 1981, in front of a crowd of 92,496, played fullback, and scored a try in the 14-14 draw with Hull F.C. in the 1982 Challenge Cup Final during the 1981–82 season at Wembley Stadium, London on Saturday 1 May 1982, in front of a crowd of 92,147, played fullback, and scored a try in the 9-18 defeat by Hull F.C. in the 1982 Challenge Cup Final replay during the 1981–82 season at Elland Road, Leeds on Wednesday 19 May 1982, in front of a crowd of 41,171, and played right wing in the 19-6 victory over Wigan in the 1984 Challenge Cup Final during the 1983–84 season at Wembley Stadium, London on Saturday 5 May 1984, in front of a crowd of 80,116.

Wright played right wing, and scored a try in Widnes' 16-11 victory over Workington Town in the 1976 Lancashire Cup Final during the 1976–77 season at Central Park, Wigan on Saturday 30 October 1976, played right wing, and scored a try in the 15-13 victory over Workington Town in the 1978 Lancashire Cup Final during the 1978–79 season at Central Park, Wigan on Saturday 7 October 1978, and played right wing in the 11-0 victory over Workington Town in the 1979 Lancashire Cup Final during the 1979–80 season at The Willows, Salford on Saturday 8 December 1979.

Wright played right wing, and scored 2-tries in Widnes' 13-7 victory over St Helens in the 1978 BBC2 Floodlit Trophy Final during the 1978–79 season at Knowsley Road, St. Helens on Tuesday 12 December 1978. The record for the most tries in a BBC2 Floodlit Trophy Final is 2-tries, and is jointly held by; Roy Mathias, Peter Glynn, Gerald Dunn, and Stuart Wright.

Wright played right wing in Widnes' 4-9 defeat by Warrington in the 1977–78 Players No.6 Trophy final during the 1977–78 season at Knowsley Road, St. Helens on Saturday 28 January 1978, played right wing, and scored a try in the 16-4 victory over Warrington in the 1978–79 John Player Trophy final during the 1978–79 season at Knowsley Road, St. Helens on Saturday 28 April 1979, played right wing in the 0-6 defeat by Bradford Northern in the 1979–80 John Player Trophy final during the 1979–80 season at Headingley, Leeds on Saturday 5 January 1980, and played right wing in the 10-18 defeat by Leeds in the 1983–84 John Player Special Trophy Final during the 1983–84 season at Central Park, Wigan on Saturday 14 January 1984.

=== International honours ===
Stuart Wright won caps for England while at Wigan in the 1975 Rugby League World Cup against New Zealand, while at Widnes in 1977 against Wales, in 1978 against France, and Wales, in 1979 against Wales, and France, in 1980 against Wales, and won caps for Great Britain while at Widnes in 1977 against France, New Zealand, and Australia (2 matches), and in 1978 against Australia (3 matches).

Along with James "Jim" Leytham, Stanley "Stan" Moorhouse, Peter Norburn, Keith Fielding, Martin Offiah and Sam Tomkins, having scored four tries, Stuart Wright jointly holds the record for the most tries scored in an England match, scoring four tries against Wales at Knowsley Road, St. Helens on 28 May 1978.

== Honours ==
- Open Rugby World XIII: February 1979
