= David Eckersley =

English rugby league footballer

Personal information
- Full name: David Eckersley
- Born: 10 October 1948 (age 78) Leigh, England

Playing information
- Height: 5 ft 9 in (1.75 m)
- Weight: 12 st 0 lb (76 kg)
- Position: Fullback, Centre, Stand-off
Club
Years	Team	Pld	T	G	FG	P
1968–72	Leigh	160	24	22	0	116
1972–76	St Helens	124	60	5	0	190
1976–80	Widnes	167	29	30	11	158
1977	Cronulla	9	0	0	0	0
1980–84	Fulham	93	21	6	17	93
	Total	553	134	63	28	557
Representative
Years	Team	Pld	T	G	FG	P
1975–78	England	6	0	0	0	0
1973–74	Great Britain	4	0	0	0	0
1971–79	Lancashire	9	1	1	0	5

David Eckersley (born 10 October 1948) is an English former professional rugby league footballer who played in the 1960s, 1970s and 1980s. He played at representative level for Great Britain and England, and at club level for Leigh, St Helens, Widnes, Cronulla-Sutherland Sharks and Fulham RLFC, as a goal-kicking fullback, centre or stand-off.

== Background ==
Eckersley was born in Leigh, Lancashire, and as of 2012, he lives in Sydney, Australia.

== Playing career ==
=== Leigh ===
Eckersley played stand-off in Leigh's 11–6 victory over Wigan in the 1969 BBC2 Floodlit Trophy Final during the 1969–70 season at Central Park, Wigan on Tuesday 16 December 1969.

Eckersley played stand-off in Leigh's 2–11 defeat by Swinton in the 1969 Lancashire Cup Final during the 1969–70 season at Central Park, Wigan on Saturday 1 November 1969, and played stand-off, and scored a try in the 7–4 victory over St. Helens in the 1970 Lancashire Cup Final during the 1970–71 season at Station Road, Swinton on Saturday 28 November 1970.

Eckersley played fullback, scored a try, and 40-yard drop goal in Leigh's 24–7 victory over Leeds in the 1971 Challenge Cup Final during the 1970–71 season at Wembley Stadium, London on Saturday 15 May 1971.

=== Widnes ===
Eckersley played stand-off in Widnes' 16–11 victory over Workington Town in the 1976 Lancashire Cup Final during the 1976–77 season at Central Park, Wigan on Saturday 30 October 1976, played fullback in the 15–13 victory over Workington Town in the 1978 Lancashire Cup Final during the 1978–79 season at Central Park, Wigan on Saturday 7 October 1978, and played fullback in the 11–0 victory over Workington Town in the 1979 Lancashire Cup Final during the 1979–80 season at The Willows, Salford on Saturday 8 December 1979.

Eckersley played stand-off in Widnes' 5–20 defeat by St. Helens in the 1976 Challenge Cup Final during the 1975–76 season at Wembley Stadium, London on Saturday 8 May 1976, played at centre in the 7–16 defeat by Leeds in the 1977 Challenge Cup Final during the 1976–77 season at Wembley Stadium, London on Saturday 7 May 1977, and played fullback, and scored a drop goal in the 12–3 victory over Wakefield Trinity in the 1979 Challenge Cup Final during the 1978–79 season at Wembley Stadium, London on Saturday 5 May 1979.

Eckersley played fullback in Widnes 13–7 victory over St. Helens in the 1978 BBC2 Floodlit Trophy Final during the 1978–79 season at Knowsley Road, St. Helens on Tuesday 12 December 1978.

Eckersley played fullback in Widnes' 4–9 defeat by Warrington in the 1977–78 Players No.6 Trophy Final during the 1977–78 season at Knowsley Road, St. Helens on Saturday 28 January 1978, played fullback, and was man of the match in the 16–4 victory over Warrington in the 1978–79 John Player Trophy Final during the 1978–79 season at Knowsley Road, St. Helens on Saturday 28 April 1979, and played fullback in the 0–6 defeat by Bradford Northern in the 1979–80 John Player Trophy Final during the 1979–80 season at Headingley, Leeds on Saturday 5 January 1980.

=== International honours ===
Dave Eckersley won caps for England while at St Helens in 1975 against France (sub), in the 1975 Rugby League World Cup against Wales (sub), and France (sub), while at Widnes in 1977 against Wales (sub), in 1978 against Wales (sub), and won caps for Great Britain while at St Helens in 1973 against Australia (sub), and Australia, and in 1974 against Australia (sub), and played at centre in the 16–11 victory over Australia at Sydney Cricket Ground on Saturday 6 July 1974.
