= Bill Pattinson (rugby league, born 1945) =

English rugby league footballer (1945–2026)

Personal information
- Full name: William K. Pattinson
- Born: 31 March 1945 Cockermouth, England
- Died: 30 June 2026 (aged 81)

Playing information
- Position: Second-row, Loose forward
Club
Years	Team	Pld	T	G	FG	P
1965–1969	Workington Town	112	31	2
1969–1970	Warrington	25	4	0	0	12
1970–1973	Swinton	69	12	3	0	42
1973–1975	Bradford Northern	64	7	1	0	23
1975–1977	Swinton	36	0	0	0	0
	Total	306	54	6	0	77
Representative
Years	Team	Pld	T	G	FG	P
1966	Great Britain U24	1	0	0	0	0
1966–1969	Cumberland	6	2	0	0	6
- Relatives: Bobby Pattinson (nephew); Bill Pattinson (nephew)

William K. Pattinson (31 March 1945 – 30 June 2026) was an English professional rugby league footballer who played in the 1960s and 1970s. He played at representative level for England (Under-24s) and Cumberland, and at club level for Risehow ARLFC, Workington Town, Warrington, Swinton (two spells) and Bradford Northern, as an occasional goal-kicking second-row or loose forward.

== Background ==
Pattinson was born in Cockermouth, Cumberland, England on 31 March 1945. He died on 30 June 2026, aged 81.

He was the uncle of the rugby league footballer who played in the 1970s for Blackpool Borough (37 appearances, including the 15–25 defeat by Castleford in the Player's No.6 Trophy League Cup Final at The Willows, Salford on 22 January 1977) and Workington Town (1 appearance); Malcolm Pattinson, the rugby league footballer who played in the 1970s for Workington Town (12 appearances); Stanley "Stan" Pattinson, the rugby league footballer who played in the 1970s and 1980s for Workington Town (112 appearances from 1979 to 1985); Robert Pattinson, the rugby league footballer; Bill Pattinson; and Harold Pattinson.

== Playing career ==
=== International honours ===
Pattinson won a cap for England (Under-24s) while at Workington Town in the 4–7 defeat by France (Under-24s) at Stade Jean Dauger, Bayonne, France, on 26 November 1966.

=== County honours ===
Pattinson won six caps for Cumberland while at Workington Town, including a 17–15 victory over Australia at Derwent Park, Workington, on 18 November 1967.

=== Challenge Cup Final appearances ===
Pattinson played at second-row in Bradford Northern's 14–33 defeat by Featherstone Rovers in the 1973 Challenge Cup Final during the 1972–73 season at Wembley Stadium, London, on 12 May 1973, in front of a crowd of 72,395.

=== County Cup Final appearances ===
Pattinson played loose forward in Swinton's 11–25 defeat by Salford in the 1972 Lancashire Cup Final during the 1972–73 season at Wilderspool, Warrington, on 21 October 1972.

=== Player's №6 Trophy Final appearances ===
Pattinson played loose forward in Bradford Northern's 3–2 victory over Widnes in the 1974–75 Player's No.6 Trophy Final during the 1974–75 season at Wilderspool, Warrington, on 25 January 1975.

=== Club career ===
Pattinson was transferred from Risehow ARLFC to Workington Town during May 1965, he made his début for Workington Town in the 8–10 defeat by Salford at Derwent Park, Workington, on 11 December 1965, he played his last match for Workington Town in the 11–31 defeat by St. Helens at Knowsley Road, St. Helens, on 23 August 1969, he was transferred from Workington Town to Warrington between 23 August 1969 and 29 August 1969, he made his début for Warrington in the 14–7 victory over St. Helens at Derwent Park, Workington, on 29 August 1969, he played alongside Bob Fulton during the 1969–70 season, he played his last match for Warrington in the 8–36 defeat by St. Helens at Knowsley Road, St. Helens], on 18 April 1970, he was transferred from Warrington to Swinton, he made his début for Swinton, and scored two tries in the 22–7 victory over Hull F.C. at Station Road, Swinton, on 22 August 1970, he was transferred from Swinton to Bradford Northern during January 1973, he made his début for Bradford Northern in the 17–4 victory over Whitehaven at Odsal Stadium, Bradford, on 27 January 1973, he was part of the squad that won the Championship Second Division during the 1973–74 season, he was transferred from Bradford Northern to Swinton, he played his last match for Swinton in the 23–14 victory over York at Station Road, Swinton, on 24 April 1977, after which he retired from rugby league.

== Note ==
Pattinson's first-team début for Workington Town's is stated as being against Liverpool City on 3 April 1965 in the 'Cumberland Rugby League: 100 Greats' reference but this match is stated as being against Liverpool City A-Team, with Pattinson having no first-team appearances during the 1964–65 season in the 'Workington Town Hall of Fame' reference.
