= Reg Bowden =

English RL coach and former rugby league footballer

Personal information
- Full name: Reginald Bowden
- Born: 17 December 1949 (age 75) Widnes, England
- Height: 5 ft 8 in (1.73 m)
- Weight: 12 st 0 lb (76 kg)

Playing information
- Position: Scrum-half
Club
Years	Team	Pld	T	G	FG	P
1969–80	Widnes	374	42	2	4	134
1980–84	Fulham RLFC	120	14	0	0	42
1984	Warrington	9+1	0	0	0	0
	Total	504	56	2	4	176
Representative
Years	Team	Pld	T	G	FG	P
1975–79	Lancashire	10	3	0	0	9

Coaching information
Club
Years	Team	Gms	W	D	L	W%
1980–84	Fulham RLFC	80	26	2	52	33
1984–85	Warrington	68	28	0	40	41
	Total	148	54	2	92	36
- Source: As of 1 March 2021

Reginald Bowden (born 17 December 1949) is an English former professional rugby league footballer, and coach. He played for Widnes, Fulham and Warrington. He played as a scrum-half. He was head coach at Fulham and Warrington.

== Background ==
Reginald Bowden was born in Widnes, Lancashire, England.

== Playing career ==
Bowden signed for Widnes in 1968. He made his first team début in 1969.

He made 16 major cup Final appearances for Widnes, including four Wembley cup finals.

Bowden moved to Fulham in 1980. He cost the club £25,000 at a time when the world record transfer fee was £40,000.

== Coaching career ==
He was player-coach at Fulham RLFC 1980-84, then coached for two years at Warrington.

== Administrative career ==
After leaving Warrington he joined the board of directors at Widnes, where he spent a further 10 years as a director.
