= 1976–77 Rugby League Premiership =

1976–77 Premiership
- Structure: National knockout championship
- Winners: St Helens
- Runners-up: Warrington

The 1976–77 Rugby League Premiership was the third end of season Rugby League Premiership competition.

The winners were St Helens.

== First round ==
Date	Team one	Team two	Score
30 Apr	St Helens	Wigan	10-10
1 May	Castleford	Salford	25-17
1 May	Featherstone Rovers	Bradford Northern	13-2
1 May	Hull Kingston Rovers	Warrington	18-13+
3 May	Wigan	St Helens	3-8

+Match awarded to Warrington after Hull Kingston Rovers fielded an ineligible player (Phil Lowe).

== Semi-finals ==
Date	Team one	Team two	Score
10 May	Castleford	St Helens	12-36
11 May	Featherstone Rovers	Warrington	17-13
14 May	St Helens	Castleford	25-13
15 May	Warrington	Featherstone Rovers	11-1

== Final ==
28 May 1977

St Helens	32-20	Warrington
G-Pimblett (7); T-Pimblett, Benyon, Cunningham, Mathias, K Gwilliam, James		G-Hesford (4); T-A Gwilliam, Gordon, Weavill, Philbin

Station Road, Swinton
Attendance: 11,507

1	Geoff Pimblett
2	Les Jones
3	Peter Glynn
4	Dave Chisnall
5	Roy Mathias
6	Billy Benyon
7	Kenneth "Ken" Gwilliam
8	Mel James
9	Eddie Cunningham
10	Graham Liptrot
11	Eric Chisnall
12	George Nicholls
13	Harry Pinner
Substitutions:
14	Alan Ashton for Peter Glynn
15	Tony Karalius for George Nicholls
Coach:
Eric Ashton

1	Derek Finnigan/Finnegan
2	Dennis Curling
3	John Bevan
4	Steve Hesford
5	Michael "Mike" Kelly
6	Alan Gwilliam
7	Parry Gordon
8	David "Dave" Weavill
9	Joseph "Joe" Price
10	Brian Case
11	Thomas Martyn
12	Roy Lester
13	Barry Philbin
Substitutions:
14	David "Dave" Cunliffe for John Bevan
15	Michael "Mike" Peers for Thomas Martyn
Coach:
Alex Murphy

== Bracket ==
First round
Castleford	25
Salford	17
St Helens	8*
Wigan	3*
Featherstone Rovers	13
Bradford Northern	2
Hull KR	18
Warrington	13^

Semi-finals
Castleford	12	13	25
St Helens	36	25	61
Featherstone Rovers	17	1	18
Warrington	13	11	24

Final
St Helens	32
Warrington	20

* - Indicates only the replay match, not the match ending in a draw.
^ - Match awarded to Warrington. See the First round section above
