= 1975–76 Rugby League Premiership =

1975–76 Premiership
- Structure: National knockout championship
- Winners: St Helens
- Runners-up: Salford

The 1975–76 Rugby League Premiership was the second end of season Rugby League Premiership competition.

The winners were St Helens.

== First round ==
Date	Team one	Team two	Score
30 Apr	Leeds	Widnes	12-2
30 Apr	St Helens	Wigan	19-6
30 Apr	Salford	Hull Kingston Rovers	21-6
30 Apr	Featherstone Rovers	Wakefield Trinity	10-14

== Semi-finals ==
Date	Team one	Team two	Score
11 May	Leeds	St Helens	5-12
11 May	Salford	Wakefield Trinity	10-5
16 May	St Helens	Leeds	21-4
16 May	Wakefield Trinity	Salford	5-14

== Final ==
22 May 1976

St Helens	15-2	Salford
G-Pimblett (3); T-Glynn, Karalius, Chisnall		DG-Watkins (2)

Station Road, Swinton
Attendance: 18,082

1	Geoff Pimblett
2	Les Jones
3	Peter Glynn
4	Derek Noonan
5	Roy Mathias
6	Billy Benyon
7	Jeff Heaton
8	Mel James
9	Tony Karalius
10	John Mantle
11	Eric Chisnall
12	George Nicholls
13	Kel Coslett
Substitutions:
14	Kenneth "Ken" Gwilliam for Jeff Heaton
15	unused
Coach:
Eric Ashton

1	David Watkins
2	Keith Fielding
3	Maurice Richards
4	Chris Hesketh
5	Gordon Graham
6	John Butler
7	Steve Nash
8	Mike Coulman
9	Dean Raistrick
10	William "Bill" Sheffield
11	John Knighton
12	Colin Dixon
13	Eric Prescott
Substitutions:
14	Samuel "Sam" Turnbull for John Knighton
15	unused
Coach:
Les Bettinson

== Bracket ==
First round
Leeds	12
Widnes	2
St Helens	19
Wigan	6
Salford	21
Hull KR	6
Featherstone Rovers	10
Wakefield Trinity	14

Semi-finals
Leeds	5	4	9
St Helens	12	21	33
Salford	10	14	24
Wakefield Trinity	5	5	10

Final
St Helens	15
Salford	2
