= Johnny Wolford =

English RL coach and former rugby league footballer (born 1945)

Personal information
- Born: third ¼ 1945 (age 79–80); Wakefield district, England

Playing information
- Position: Fullback, Centre, Stand-off, Scrum-half, Loose forward
Club
Years	Team	Pld	T	G	FG	P
1962–76	Bramley	406+4	79	21	0	281
1976–78	Bradford Northern	93+5	16	0	9	57
1978–81	Dewsbury	57+3	13	0	4	43
1981–85	Hunslet	101+12	19	0	3	66
	Total	681	127	21	16	447
Representative
Years	Team	Pld	T	G	FG	P
1970	Yorkshire	1	0	0	0	0
1969	GB Under 24	1	1	2	0	7

Coaching information
Club
Years	Team	Gms	W	D	L	W%
1988	Hunslet

Johnny Wolford (birth registered third ¼ 1945) is an English former professional rugby league footballer who played in the 1960s, 1970s and 1980s, and coached in the 1980s. He played at representative level for Great Britain (Under-24s) and Yorkshire, and at club level for Bramley, Bradford Northern, Dewsbury and Hunslet, initially as a fullback, centre, stand-off or scrum-half, and later as a loose forward, and coached at club level for Hunslet.

== Background ==
Johnny Wolford's birth was registered during third ¼ 1945 in Wakefield district, West Riding of Yorkshire, England.

== Playing career ==
=== Premiership Final appearances ===
Johnny Wolford played stand-off and scored a drop goal in Bradford Northern's 17–8 victory over Widnes in the 1977–78 Rugby League Premiership Premiership Final during the 1977–78 season at Station Road, Swinton, Pendlebury on Saturday 20 May 1978, in front of a crowd of 16,813.

=== County Cup Final appearances ===
Johnny Wolford appeared as a substitute (replacing stand-off Ian Slater) in Bradford Northern's 18–8 victory over York in the 1978–79 Yorkshire Cup Final during the 1978–79 season at Headingley, Leeds on Saturday 28 October 1978, in front of a crowd 10,429.

=== BBC2 Floodlit Trophy Final appearances ===
Johnny Wolford played loose forward and scored two-goals/conversions in Bramley's 15–7 victory over Widnes in the 1973 BBC2 Floodlit Trophy Final during the 1973–74 season at Naughton Park, Widnes on Tuesday 18 December 1973, in fornt of a crowd of 4,542.

=== Club career ===
Johnny Wolford made his début for Bramley aged-16, in the 12–18 defeat by Hunslet in the Eastern Division Championship match at Barley Mow, Bramley on Saturday 29 September 1962, he scored his first try for Bramley in the 19–2 victory over Doncaster, he was Bramley's record try scorer (extended by Jack Austin during the 1976–77 season), he transferred from Bramley to Bradford Northern, he transferred from Bradford Northern to Dewsbury, he transferred from Dewsbury to Hunslet, he appeared in 35 of the 38 matches, 34 of the 38 matches contributed to Hunslet's promotion to the First Division during the 1983–84 season, and he played his last match for Hunslet against Doncaster during 1985.
