= 1976 World Club Challenge =

Intercontinental rugby league match

1976 Unofficial World Club Challenge
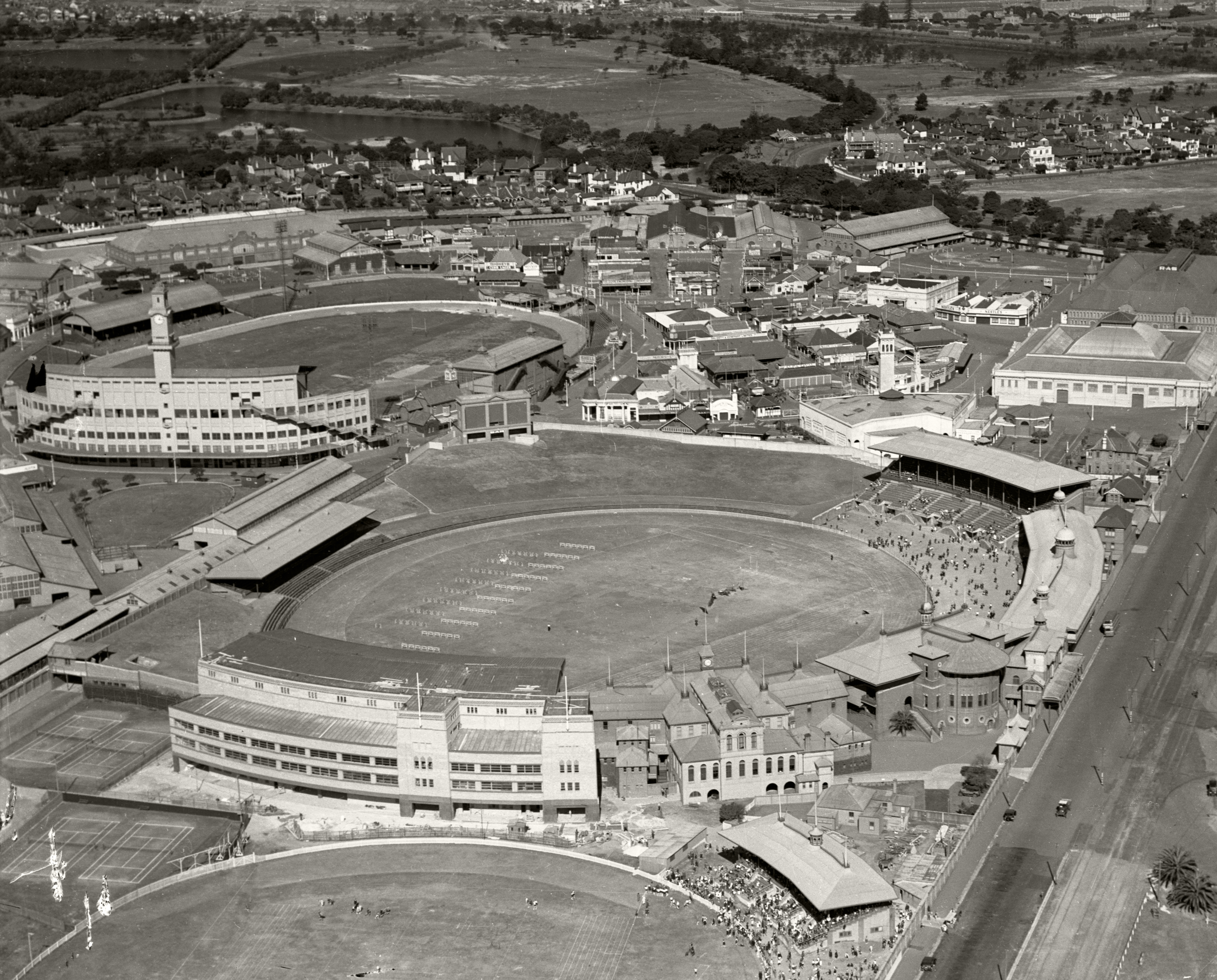
- Sydney Cricket Ground hosted the match
Eastern Suburbs	St. Helens
(NSWRFL)	(RFL)
25	2
	1	Total
EAS	0	25
ST H	0	2
- Date: 29 June 1976
- Stadium: Sydney Cricket Ground
- Location: Moore Park, Australia
- Man of the Match: Royce Ayliffe
- Referee: Gary Cook (Australia)
- Attendance: 26,856

Broadcast partners
- Broadcasters: ATN 7 (Australia)
- Commentators: Rex Mossop; Barry Ross

The 1976 World Club Challenge was an unofficial trial of what would later become the World Club Challenge concept, with the 1975 NSWRFL season's premiers, Eastern Suburbs hosting the 1975–76 Northern Rugby Football League season's Premiership and Challenge Cup winners St. Helens. The one-off challenge match was played on 29 June, right in the middle of the 1976 NSWRFL season, at the Sydney Cricket Ground before a crowd of 26,856.

The next game of its kind would not be played until 1987.

== Background ==
The game was the first of its type, and was the last to be played in Australia until 1994.

== Eastern Suburbs Roosters ==
The Roosters, coached by Jack Gibson and captained by Australian international forward Arthur Beetson, were the reigning Sydney premiers having won the NSWRFL Grand Finals in both 1974 and 1975.

== St Helens ==
Saints were the reigning English champions, having won the title in 1974-75. Saints were coached by former Great Britain captain Eric Ashton and captained by Welsh dual rugby international Kel Coslett.

== Teams ==
Eastern Suburbs	St Helens

FB	1	Russell Fairfax
LW	2	Ian Schubert
CE	3	Mark Harris
CE	4	John Brass
RW	5	Bill Mullins
FE	8	Trevor Barnes
HB	7	Kevin Stevens
LK	9	Barry Reilly
SR	11	Arthur Beetson (c)
SR	16	Ian Mackay
PR	13	Royce Ayliffe
HK	12	Elwyn Walters
PR	10	Kel Jones
Substitutions:
IC	6	Robert Laurie
IC	20	Johnny Mayes
IC	21	Grant Hedger
IC	14	Greg Townsend
Coach:
(Australia) Jack Gibson

FB	1	Geoff Pimblett
RW	2	Les Jones
CE	3	Eddie Cunningham
CE	4	Derek Noonan
LW	5	Roy Mathias
SO	6	Billy Benyon
SH	16	Kenneth Gwilliam
PR	8	John Mantle
HK	9	Tony Karalius
PR	10	Kel Coslett (c)
SR	11	Eric Chisnall
SR	12	George Nicholls
LF	13	David Hull
Substitutions:
IC	14	Peter Glynn
IC	15	Frank Wilson
IC	7	Jeff Heaton
IC	17	Mel James
Coach:
(England) Eric Ashton

== Match details ==
29 June 1976

Eastern Suburbs Roosters	25 – 2	St. Helens
Tries: Russell Fairfax; Kevin Stevens; Royce Ayliffe; Ian Schubert; Greg Townsend; Goals: John Brass (5)		Tries: Goals: Pimblett (1)

Sydney Cricket Ground, Sydney
Attendance: 26,856
Referee: Gary Cook (Australia)
Player of the Match: Royce Ayliffe

== Aftermath ==
After winning the 1974 and 1975 Sydney premierships, Eastern Suburbs would not win another until 2002, while St Helens would go on to win a third English premiership in succession in 1976–77.

The next time Easts, now known as the Sydney Roosters, would play in a World Club Challenge was in 2003 where they would again face St Helens, the 2002 Super League champions at the Reebok Stadium in Bolton, England. The result would be no different though as the Roosters defeated the Saints 38-0 in front of 19,807 fans.

To celebrate the 40th anniversary of the challenge, St Helens and the Sydney Roosters played a match as part of the 2016 World Club Series.

== See also ==
- World Club Challenge
