= 1977–78 Rugby League Premiership =

1977–78 Premiership
- Structure: National knockout championship
- Winners: Bradford Northern
- Runners-up: Widnes

The 1977–78 Rugby League Premiership was the fourth end of season Rugby League Premiership competition.

The winners were Bradford Northern.

== First round ==
Date	Team one	Team two	Score
29 Apr	Widnes	Warrington	33-8
30 Apr	Bradford Northern	Leeds	18-10
30 Apr	Hull Kingston Rovers	Wigan	17-0
30 Apr	St Helens	Salford	29-11

== Semi-finals ==
Date	Team one	Team two	Score
3 May	Hull Kingston Rovers	Widnes	12-22
3 May	St Helens	Bradford Northern	14-10
7 May	Bradford Northern	St Helens	19-12
7 May	Widnes	Hull Kingston Rovers	13-19

== Final ==
20 May 1978

Bradford Northern	17-8	Widnes
G-Mumby (2); DG-Wolford; T-Barends, Roe, D Redfearn, Haigh		G-Woods; T-Aspey (2)

Station Road, Swinton
Attendance: 16,813

1	Keith Mumby
2	David Barends
3	Peter Roe
4	Jack Austin
5	David Redfearn
6	Johnny Wolford
7	Alan Redfearn
8	Ian Van Bellen
9	Dean Raistrick
10	Jimmy Thompson
11	Graham Joyce
12	Dennis Trotter
13	Bob Haigh
Substitutions:
14	Neil Fox for Ian Van Bellen
15	Colin Forsyth for Graham Joyce
Coach:
Peter Fox

1	David Eckersley
2	Stuart Wright
3	Eric Hughes
4	Mal Aspey
5	Paul Woods
6	Ken Gill
7	Reg Bowden
8	Jim Mills
9	Keith Elwell
10	Glyn Shaw
11	Mick Adams
12	David Hull
13	Doug Laughton
Substitutions:
14	Bill Ramsey for Glyn Shaw
15	Mick George for Bill Ramsey
Coach:
Frank Myler
