= Roy Firth =

English rugby league footballer

Personal information
- Born: c. 1944 (age 81–82) Dewsbury, England

Playing information
- Height: 5 ft 11 in (1.80 m)
- Weight: 13 st 7 lb (86 kg)
- Position: Hooker
Club
Years	Team	Pld	T	G	FG	P
≤1968	Dewsbury
1968	→ Wakefield Trinity (loan)	2	0	0	0	0
1968–73	Hull FC	78	3	0	0	9
1973–75	Bramley
1974	→ Featherstone Rovers (loan)	5	0	0	0	0
	Total	85	3	0	0	9

Roy Firth (born c. 1944), also known by the nickname of "Bustler", is a former professional rugby league footballer who played in the 1960s and 1970s. He played at club level for Dewsbury, Wakefield Trinity (loan), Hull FC, Bramley and Featherstone Rovers (loan) as a hooker.

== Background ==
Roy Firth's birth was registered Dewsbury, West Riding of Yorkshire, England.

== Playing career ==
Roy Firth was loaned from Dewsbury to Wakefield Trinity during the early part of the 1968–69 season, he made his début for Wakefield Trinity during September 1968, he played his last match for Wakefield Trinity during the 1968–69 season, he was transferred from Dewsbury to Hull F.C. during early November 1968, he was the fourth hooker Hull F.C. had tried during the 1968–69 season, he was included in the Hull F.C. team to visit his previous club Dewsbury on Saturday 9 November 1968, he made his début for Hull FC during the 1968–69 season, he played his last match for Hull F.C. during the 1972–73 season, he was transferred from Hull F.C. to Bramley, he was signed by the Bramley head coach and former Hull F.C. rugby league footballer; Arthur Keegan, he was loaned from Bramley to Featherstone Rovers during November 1974, he made his début for Featherstone Rovers on Sunday 17 November 1974, and he played his last match for Featherstone Rovers during December 1974.

=== BBC2 Floodlit Trophy Final appearances ===
Roy Firth played hooker in Bramley's 15–7 victory over Widnes in the 1973 BBC2 Floodlit Trophy Final during the 1973–74 season at Naughton Park, Widnes on Tuesday 18 December 1973.
