= 1967–68 Yorkshire Cup =

- Structure: Regional knockout championship
- Teams: 16
- Winners: Hull Kingston Rovers
- Runners-up: Hull F.C.

The 1967–68 Yorkshire Cup was the sixtieth occasion on which the Yorkshire Cup competition had been held.

Hull Kingston Rovers won the trophy by beating Hull F.C. by the score of 9–6

The match was played at Headingley, Leeds, now in West Yorkshire. The attendance was 16,729 and receipts were £5,515

This final was a repeat of the 1920–21 final, in the only other final, to date, to be contested by the two clubs, and in which Hull Kingston Rovers also defeated local neighbours and fierce rivals Hull F.C. in a closely contested match. In 1920 the score was 2–0; this time it was almost as close.

This is also the second consecutive year in which Hull Kingston Rovers had won the trophy

== Background ==
This season there were no junior/amateur clubs taking part, no new entrants and no "leavers" and so the total of entries remained the same at sixteen.

This in turn resulted in no byes in the first round.

== Competition and results ==
=== Round 1 ===
Involved 8 matches (with no byes) and 16 clubs

Game No	Fixture date	Home team	Score	Away team	Venue	Att	Rec	Notes	Ref
1	Fri 1 Sep 1967	Castleford	7–13	Hull F.C.	Wheldon Road				
2	Fri 1 Sep 1967	Keighley	5–23	Wakefield Trinity	Lawkholme Lane				
3	Fri 1 Sep 1967	Leeds	25–10	Batley	Headingley				
4	Sat 2 Sep 1967	Bradford Northern	15–16	Dewsbury	Odsal				
5	Sat 2 Sep 1967	Bramley	4–7	Huddersfield	McLaren Field	5,070		(Note: The first Yorkshire Cup match played by Bramley at the new stadium, McLaren Field)	
6	Sat 2 Sep 1967	Doncaster	10–28	Halifax	Bentley Road Stadium/Tattersfield				
7	Sat 2 Sep 1967	Hunslet	14–8	Featherstone Rovers	Parkside				
8	Sat 2 Sep 1967	York	4–22	Hull Kingston Rovers	Clarence Street				

=== Round 2 - quarterfinals ===
Involved 4 matches and 8 clubs

Game No	Fixture date	Home team	Score	Away team	Venue	Att	Rec	Notes	Ref
1	Tue 12 Sep 1967	Halifax	2–11	Hull F.C.	Thrum Hall				
2	Tue 12 Sep 1967	Leeds	18–14	Hunslet	Headingley				
3	Wed 13 Sep 1967	Huddersfield	11–11	Dewsbury	Fartown	7,380			
4	Wed 13 Sep 1967	Wakefield Trinity	13–13	Hull Kingston Rovers	Belle Vue				

=== Round 2 - replays ===
Involved 2 matches and 4 clubs

Game No	Fixture date	Home team	Score	Away team	Venue	Att	Rec	Notes	Ref
R1	Thu 14 Sep 1967	Dewsbury	5–4	Huddersfield	Crown Flatt	4,400			
R2	Fri 15 Sep 1967	Hull Kingston Rovers	14–5	Wakefield Trinity	Craven Park (1)				

=== Round 3 – semifinals ===
Involved 2 matches and 4 clubs

Game No	Fixture date	Home team	Score	Away team	Venue	Att	Rec	Notes	Ref
1	Tue 26 Sep 1967	Dewsbury	0–21	Hull Kingston Rovers	Crown Flatt				
2	Wed 27 Sep 1967	Hull F.C.	31–6	Leeds	Boulevard				

=== Final ===
Game No	Fixture date	Home team	Score	Away team	Venue	Att	Rec	Notes	Ref
	Saturday 14 October 1967	Hull Kingston Rovers	8–7	Hull F.C.	Headingley	16,729	£5,515	(Note: Headingley, Leeds, is the home ground of Leeds RLFC with a capacity of 21,000. The record attendance was 40,175 for a league match between Leeds and Bradford Northern on 21 May 1947.)	

==== Teams and scorers ====
Hull Kingston Rovers	№	Hull F.C.
	teams	
Cyril Kellett	1	Arthur Keegan
Christopher Young	2	Norman Oliver
John Moore	3	David Doyle-Davidson
Dave Elliott	4	John Maloney
Alan Burwell	5	Geoff Stocks
Roger Millward	6	Terry Devonshire
Colin Cooper	7	Chris Davidson
William Holliday	8	Mick Harrison
Peter Flanagan	9	Alan McGlone
Brian Mennell	10	Eric Broom
Phil Lowe	11	John Edson
John Hickson	12	Jim Macklin
Terry Major	13	Cyril Sykes
Frank Foster (for John Hickson)	14	
Colin Hutton	Coach	Johnny Whiteley
9	score	6
7	HT	0
	Scorers	
	Tries	
Alan Burwell (1)	T	
Roger Millward (1)	T	Chris Davidson (1)
	Goals	
Cyril Kellett (1)	G	John Maloney (1)
	G	Chris Davidson (1)
	Drop Goals	
	DG	
Referee		Dennis Davies (Manchester)
White Rose Trophy for Man of the match		Chris Davidson - Hull F.C. - scrum-half
sponsored by		

Scoring - Try = three (3) points - Goal = two (2) points - Drop goal = two (2) points

=== The road to success ===
First round
Bramley	4
Huddersfield	7
Bradford Northern	15
Dewsbury	16
Keighley	5
Wakefield Trinity	23
York	4
Hull Kingston Rovers	22
Doncaster	10
Halifax	28
Castleford	7
Hull F.C.	13
Leeds	25
Batley	10
Hunslet	14
Featherstone Rovers	8

Second round
Huddersfield	11 (4)
Dewsbury	11 (5)
Wakefield Trinity	13 (5)
Hull Kingston Rovers	13 (14)
Halifax	2
Hull F.C.	11
Leeds	18
Hunslet	14

Semi-finals
Dewsbury	0
Hull Kingston Rovers	21
Hull F.C.	31
Leeds	6

Final
Hull Kingston Rovers	8
Hull F.C.	7

== See also ==
- 1967–68 Northern Rugby Football League season
- Rugby league county cups
