= 1975–76 BBC2 Floodlit Trophy =

- Structure: Floodlit knockout championship
- Teams: 22
- Winners: St. Helens
- Runners-up: Dewsbury

The 1975–76 BBC2 Floodlit Trophy was the eleventh occasion on which the BBC2 Floodlit Trophy competition had been held.

St. Helens won the trophy by beating Dewsbury by the score of 22-2
The match was played at Knowsley Road, Eccleston, St Helens, Merseyside. The attendance was 3,858, and the receipts were £1,747

== Background ==
This season saw no changes in the entrants, no new members and no withdrawals, the number remaining at twenty-two.
The format was again changed slightly, in that the preliminary round as well as the remainder of the tournament was played on a knock-out basis.
The preliminary round now involved twelve clubs, to reduce the numbers taking part in the competition proper to just sixteen.

== Competition and results ==
=== Preliminary round ===
Involved 6 matches and 12 clubs

Game No	Fixture date	Home team	Score	Away team	Venue	Att	Rec	Notes	Ref
P	Sun 14 Sep 1975	Dewsbury	7-3	Wakefield Trinity	Crown Flatt			1	
P	Sun 14 Sep 1975	Halifax	6-32	Bramley	Thrum Hall				
P	Tue 23 Sep 1975	Swinton	6-12	Warrington	Station Road				
P	Wed 24 Sep 1975	Leeds	21-10	Castleford	Headingley				
P	Tue 30 Sep 1975	Wigan	14-14	Salford	Central Park				
P	Wed 8 Oct 1975	Rochdale Hornets	7-15	St. Helens	Athletic Grounds	805			

=== Preliminary round – replays ===
Involved 4 matches and the same 8 Clubs in reverse fixtures (the other two matches were on a single leg basis)

Game No	Fixture date	Home team	Score	Away team	Venue	Att	Rec	Notes	Ref
R	Tue 7 Oct 1975	Salford	19-25	Wigan	The Willows				

=== Round 1 – first round ===
Involved 8 matches and 16 clubs

Game No	Fixture date	Home team	Score	Away team	Venue	Att	Rec	Notes	Ref
1	Tue 30 Sep 1975	Oldham	16-10	Widnes	Watersheddings				
2	Tue 7 Oct 1975	Dewsbury	22-10	Keighley	Crown Flatt				
3	Tue 7 Oct 1975	Hull Kingston Rovers	11-12	Huddersfield	Craven Park (1)				
4	Tue 14 Oct 1975	Barrow	12-7	Leigh	Craven Park (1)				
5	Tue 21 Oct 1975	Hull F.C.	18-11	Bramley	Boulevard				
6	Tue 21 Oct 1975	New Hunslet	9-10	Leeds	Elland Road Greyhound Stadium				
7	Wed 22 Oct 1975	St. Helens	38-10	Whitehaven	Knowsley Road	2,600			
8	Tue 28 Oct 1975	Warrington	8-14	Wigan	Wilderspool			2	

=== Round 2 – quarter finals ===
Involved 4 matches with 8 clubs

Game No	Fixture date	Home team	Score	Away team	Venue	Att	Rec	Notes	Ref
1	Tue 4 Nov 1975	Leeds	17-10	Wigan	Headingley			2	
2	Tue 11 Nov 1975	Oldham	9-11	Dewsbury	Watersheddings				
3	Tue 18 Nov 1975	St. Helens	36-13	Hull F.C.	Knowsley Road	2,500			
4	Tue 25 Nov 1975	Barrow	14-0	Huddersfield	Craven Park				

=== Round 3 – semi-finals ===
Involved 2 matches and 4 clubs

Game No	Fixture date	Home team	Score	Away team	Venue	Att	Rec	Notes	Ref
1	Tue 2 Dec 1975	St. Helens	11-9	Barrow	Knowsley Road	2.000			
2	Tue 9 Dec 1975	Dewsbury	7-0	Leeds	Crown Flatt				

=== Final ===
Game No	Fixture date	Home team	Score	Away team	Venue	Att	Rec	Notes	Ref
F	Tuesday 16 December 1975	St. Helens	22-2	Dewsbury	Knowsley Road	3,858	1747	2 3 4	

==== Teams and scorers ====
St. Helens	№	Dewsbury
	teams	
Geoff Pimblett	1	John Langley
Les Jones	2	John Hegarty
Billy Benyon	3	Graham Chalkley
David Hull	4	Ian Simpson
Roy Mathias	5	Garry Mitchell
Frank Wilson	6	Nigel Stephenson
Jeff Heaton	7	Alan Bates
John Mantle	8	Harry Beverley
Anthony "Tony" Karalius	9	Ray Price
Mel James	10	Steve Hankins
George Nicholls	11	Steve Halloran
Eric Chisnall	12	Graham Bell
Kel Coslett	13	Jeff Grayshon
	Subs	
David Eckersley	14	Stephen Lee
Graham Liptrot	15	Phil Artis
Eric Ashton	Coach	Dave Cox
22	score	2
11	HT	0
	Scorers	
	Tries	
Billy Benyon (1)	T	
David Hull (1)	T	
Roy Mathias (2)	T	
Frank Wilson (1)	T	
	Goals	
Kel Coslett (1)	G	Nigel Stephenson (1)
Geoff Pimblett (2)	G	
	Drop Goals	
Jeff Heaton (1)	DG	
Referee		W H (Billy) Thompson (Huddersfield)

Scoring - Try = three (3) points - Goal = two (2) points - Drop goal = two (2) points

=== The road to success ===
This tree excludes any preliminary round fixtures

First round
St Helens	38
Whitehaven	10
Hull F.C.	18
Bramley	11
Barrow	12
Leigh	7
Hull Kingston Rovers	11
Huddersfield	12
Oldham	16
Widnes	10
Dewsbury	22
Keighley	10
New Hunslet	9
Leeds	10
Warrington	8
Wigan	14

Second round
St Helens	36
Hull F.C.	13
Barrow	14
Huddersfield	0
Oldham	9
Dewsbury	11
Leeds	17
Wigan	10

Semi-finals
St Helens	11
Barrow	9
Dewsbury	7
Leeds	0

Final
St Helens	22
Dewsbury	2

== Notes and comments ==
1 * Dewsbury, who joined the competition in season 1973–74, win their first game in the competition
2 * This match was televised
3 * The Rothmans Rugby League Yearbook 1990-1991 and 1991-92 and the RUGBYLEAGUEprojects gives the attendance as 3,858 but theofficial St. Helens archives give it as 3,850
4 * Knowsley Road was the home of St Helens R.F.C. from 1890 until its closure in 2010. The final capacity was 17,500 although the record attendance was 35,695 set on 26 December 1949 for a league game between St Helens and Wigan.

== See also ==
- 1975–76 Northern Rugby Football League season
- 1975 Lancashire Cup
- 1975 Yorkshire Cup
- BBC2 Floodlit Trophy
- Rugby league county cups
