= 1973–74 BBC2 Floodlit Trophy =

- Structure: Floodlit knockout championship
- Teams: 21
- Winners: Bramley
- Runners-up: Widnes

The 1973–74 BBC2 Floodlit Trophy was the ninth occasion on which the BBC2 Floodlit Trophy competition had been held.

This year, there was another new name on the trophy when Bramley won the trophy by beating Widnes by the score of 15-7.

The match was played at Naughton Park, Widnes, Cheshire (but historically in the county of Lancashire). Attendance was 4,542, and receipts were £1538.

Bramley had been expected to make up the numbers against Widnes. Bramley had joined the Rugby League for the 1896-97 season, the second season in its existence, and in the 77 years since, this was the first trophy the club had won. It would also be the only trophy before the team left the league at the end of the 1999 season. This was also the second consecutive season in which Widnes had finished as runners-up in the BBC Floodlit Trophy.

== Background ==
This was the year in which the Arab-Israeli war created an oil crisis, which, together with the miners' work to rule, caused the British Government to ban the use of floodlights in sport on 13 November. This, in turn, led to many of the Floodlit Trophy matches, including the final, being played in the afternoon rather than at night.

This season saw three new clubs join the tournament. These were Bramley, Dewsbury and Whitehaven, which increased the number of entrants by three, to a new high of twenty-one.

The format remained the same as last season, with the preliminary round played on a two-legged home and away basis and the rest of the tournament played on a knock-out basis. The preliminary round now involved ten clubs, reducing the number taking part in the competition proper to just sixteen.

== Competition and results ==
=== Preliminary round – first leg ===
Involved 5 matches and 10 clubs

Game No	Fixture date	Home team	Score	Away team	Venue	agg	Att	Rec	Notes	Ref
P1	Mon 20 Aug 1973	Barrow	6-12	St. Helens	Craven Park		2,819			
P1	Tue 21 Aug 1973	Castleford	32-10	Huddersfield	Wheldon Road		1,195			
P1	Wed 22 Aug 1973	Leeds	31-2	Hull F.C.	Headingley		3,577			
P1	Wed 5 Sep 1973	Rochdale Hornets	15-14	Swinton	Athletic Grounds		1,552			
P1	Tue 11 Sep 1973	Oldham	12-14	Wigan	Watersheddings		1,459			

=== Preliminary round – second leg ===
Involved 5 matches and the same 10 Clubs in reverse fixtures

Game No	Fixture date	Home team	Score	Away team	Venue	agg	Att	Rec	Notes	Ref
P2	Mon 27 Aug 1973	St. Helens	20-8	Barrow	Knowsley Road	32-14	3,000		1	
P2	Wed 19 Sep 1973	Huddersfield	0-18	Castleford	Fartown	10-50	696			
P2	Tue 4 Sep 1973	Hull F.C.	14-23	Leeds	Boulevard	16-54	1,500		2	
P2	Wed 26 Sep 1973	Swinton	5-6	Rochdale Hornets	Station Road	19-21	1,874			
P2	Tue 18 Sep 1973	Wigan	9-16	Oldham	Central Park	23-28	3,469			

=== Round 1 – first round ===
Involved 8 matches and 16 clubs

Game No	Fixture date	Home team	Score	Away team	Venue	Att	Rec	Notes	Ref
1	Tue 2 Oct 1973	Leeds	7-6	Keighley	Headingley	2,788		3	
2	Tue 9 Oct 1973	Leigh	10-13	Widnes	Hilton Park	3,000		3	
3	Wed 10 Oct 1973	Oldham	0-4	Rochdale Hornets	Watersheddings	1,555			
4	Wed 10 Oct 1973	Wakefield Trinity	9-10	Bramley	Belle Vue	1,393		4	
5	Tue 16 Oct 1973	St. Helens	35-5	Whitehaven	Knowsley Road	2,108		3 5 6	
6	Tue 23 Oct 1973	Salford	26-4	Warrington	The Willows	4,389		3 7	
7	Wed 24 Oct 1973	Hull Kingston Rovers	28-8	Dewsbury	Craven Park (1)	2,912		8	
8	Tue 30 Oct 1973	Castleford	26-10	Halifax	Wheldon Road	831		3	

=== Round 2 – quarter finals ===
Involved 4 matches with 8 clubs

Game No	Fixture date	Home team	Score	Away team	Venue	Att	Rec	Notes	Ref
1	Tue 6 Nov 1973	St. Helens	15-7	Rochdale Hornets	Knowsley Road	3,150		3	
2	Tue 13 Nov 1973	Bramley	13-2	Castleford	McLaren Field	1,110		3 9	
3	Tue 20 Nov 1973	Salford	11-15	Widnes	The Willows	2,422		3	
4	Tue 27 Nov 1973	Hull Kingston Rovers	12-10	Leeds	Craven Park (1)	1,343		3	

=== Round 3 – semi-finals ===
Involved 2 matches and 4 clubs

Game No	Fixture date	Home team	Score	Away team	Venue	Att	Rec	Notes	Ref
1	Tue 4 Dec 1973	Bramley	13-12	St. Helens	McLaren Field	1,700		3	
2	Tue 11 Dec 1973	Hull Kingston Rovers	8-13	Widnes	Craven Park (1)	1,550		3	

=== Final ===
Game No	Fixture date	Home team	Score	Away team	Venue	Att	Rec	Notes	Ref
F	Tuesday 18 December 1973	Widnes	7-15	Bramley	Naughton Park	4,542	1538	3 a b c d e	

==== Teams and scorers ====
Bramley	№	Widnes
	teams	
Arthur "Ollie" Keegan	1	Ray Dutton
Peter Goodchild	2	Dennis O'Neill
Keith Bollon	3	Eric Hughes
K. John Hughes	4	Mal Aspey
Jack Austin	5	Dave Macko
Trevor Briggs	6	Tommy Warburton
Bernard "Bernie"/"Barney" Ward	7	Reg Bowden
David Briggs	8	Brian Hogan
Roy Firth	9	Keith Elwell
Anthony J./Antony J. "Tony" Cheshire	10	Nicholas "Nick" Nelson
David Sampson	11	Barry Sheridan
Graham Idle	12	Bob Blackwood
Johnny Wolford	13	Doug Laughton
Dennis/Denis Ashman (for Bernard "Bernie"/"Barney" Ward)	14	? (unused)
Kenneth "Ken" Huxley (unused)	15	John Foran (for Bob Blackwood)
Arthur "Ollie" Keegan	Coach	Vince Karalius
15	score	7
5	HT	4
	Scorers	
	Tries	
P. Goodchild (1 obstruction try)	T	Dave Macko (1)
Jack Austin (1)	T	
David Sampson (1)	T	
	Goals	
Barney Ward (1)	G	Ray Dutton (2)
John Wolford (2)	G	
Referee		D. Gerald "Gerry" Kershaw (York)

Scoring - Try = three (3) points - Goal = two (2) points - Drop goal = two (2) points

=== The road to success ===
This tree excludes any preliminary round fixtures

First round
Hull Kingston Rovers	26
Dewsbury	8
Leeds	7
Keighley	6
Salford	26
Warrington	4
Leigh	10
Widnes	13
Wakefield Trinity	9
Bramley	10
Castleford	26
Halifax	10
St. Helens	35
Whitehaven	5
Oldham	0
Rochdale Hornets	4

Second round
Hull Kingston Rovers	12
Leeds	10
Salford	11
Widnes	15
Bramley	13
Castleford	2
St. Helens	15
Rochdale Hornets	7

Semi-finals
Hull Kingston Rovers	8
Widnes	13
Bramley	13
St. Helens	12

Final
Widnes	7
Bramley	15

== Notes and comments ==
1 * The John Player Yearbook 1974–75 gives the attendance as 3,000, but the official St. Helens archives gives it as 2,000
2 * At the time this was the highest aggregate score and was never to be beaten
3 * This match was televised
4 * Bramley joins the competition and plays the first game in the competition
5 * The John Player Yearbook 1974–75 gives the attendance as 1,500, but the official St. Helens archives gives it as 2,108
6 * Whitehaven join the competition and play first game in the competition
7 * Salford, who joined the competition in season 1966-67, won their first game in the competition
8 * Dewsbury join the competition and plays its first game in the competition
9 * Bramley play their first game at home in the competition
a * There appears to be even more confusion about the attendance than normal. The Rothmans Rugby League Yearbook 1990-1991 and 1991-92 gives it 4,422, the RUGBYLEAGUEprojects as 4,542, The John Player Yearbook 1974–75 as 4,000, and the Daily Mirror of 19 December 1973 as 4,500
b * The Winning score and margin were a new record for the final, to date
c * The final was played in daylight because of restrictions on the use of electricity and floodlights in sport
d * Bramley had joined the Rugby League for the 1896-97 season, the second season in its existence, and in the 77 years since, this was the first trophy the club had ever won. It would also be the only trophy before leaving the league at the end of the 1999 season
e * Naughton Park was the home ground of Widnes from 1895 to 1997, when a new stadium was built on the same site. The final capacity was estimated to be under 10,000, although the record attendance was 24,205 set on 16 February 1961 in a match v St. Helens

== See also ==
- 1973–74 Northern Rugby Football League season
- 1973 Lancashire Cup
- 1973 Yorkshire Cup
- BBC2 Floodlit Trophy
- Rugby league county cups
