= Club Championship (rugby league) =

Rugby league competition for British clubs

The Club Championship was a competition for British rugby league clubs during the 1973–74 season. The competition was a replacement for the end-of-season playoff system which had been held between 1906 and 1973. Although named the Club Championship, it was considered a separate competition to the League Championship, which was awarded to league winners, Salford. The tournament was won by Warrington. It was replaced by the Rugby League Premiership after one season.

== Format ==
Qualification for the competition was determined by a merit points system. Points were awarded based on clubs final league position, and victories in knockout competitions during the season.

A preliminary knockout round also took place for the top 12 Second Division clubs, with three winners qualifying for the Club Championship. These three clubs were joined by the 13 teams who were awarded the most merit points.

=== Merit points ===
- Qualified: Warrington (68), Leeds (64), St Helens (53), Salford (51), Featherstone Rovers (47), Rochdale Hornets (45), Bramley (43), Wakefield Trinity (42), Dewsbury (40), Castleford (40), Widnes (39), Wigan (38), Bradford Northern (30), Workington Town (28), Keighley (25), Hull (9)
- Failed to qualify: Leigh (24), Hull KR (22), Whitehaven (20), York (20), Halifax (18), Swinton (17), Oldham (17), Batley (10), Huddersfield (8), Barrow (6), New Hunslet (4), Huyton (4), Blackpool Borough (3), Doncaster (2)

== First round ==
The draw was seeded based on the number of merit points awarded to each team, with the teams with the most points being awarded home advantage. As Castleford and Dewsbury had been awarded the same number of points, a coin toss was used to determine their respective positions in the merit table.

Date	Team one	Score	Team two
20 April 1974	Leeds	31–12	Keighley
20 April 1974	St Helens	24–7	Workington Town
21 April 1974	Bramley	0–14	Castleford
21 April 1974	Featherstone Rovers	22–14	Wigan
21 April 1974	Rochdale Hornets	5–31	Widnes
21 April 1974	Salford	16–16	Bradford Northern
21 April 1974	Wakefield Trinity	26–11	Dewsbury
21 April 1974	Warrington	34–12	Hull

=== Replay ===
Date	Team one	Score	Team two
25 April 1974	Bradford Northern	17–8	Salford

== Second round ==
Date	Team one	Score	Team two
27 April 1974	Warrington	15–9	Bradford Northern
28 April 1974	Featherstone Rovers	16–19	Wakefield Trinity
28 April 1974	Leeds	20–15	Widnes
28 April 1974	St Helens	25–9	Castleford

== Semi finals ==
Date	Team one	Score	Team two
3 May 1974	Leeds	10–23	St Helens
4 May 1974	Warrington	12–7	Wakefield Trinity

== Final ==
Date	Team one	Score	Team two
18 May 1974	Warrington	13–12	St Helens

== See also ==
- 1973–74 Northern Rugby Football League season
