= Nigel Stephenson =

English RL coach and former England international rugby league footballer

Personal information
- Full name: Nigel Stephenson
- Born: 12 October 1950 (age 75) Dewsbury, England

Playing information
- Height: 5 ft 10 in (1.78 m)
- Weight: 12 st 7 lb (79 kg)
- Position: Centre
Club
Years	Team	Pld	T	G	FG	P
1968–78	Dewsbury	327+1	124	826	39	2063
1978–81	Bradford Northern	89+1	14	36	17	131
1981–82	Carlisle	34	14	0	5	47
1982–84	Wakefield Trinity	69+1	25	11	13	120
1984–86	Dewsbury	31+9	7	0	5	33
1986–88	York	29+27	12	1	2	52
1988–89	Huddersfield	6+5	1	1	1	7
	Total	629	197	875	82	2453
Representative
Years	Team	Pld	T	G	FG	P
1971–78	Yorkshire	7+3	9	13	0	53
1975	England	1	0	0	0	0

Coaching information
Club
Years	Team	Gms	W	D	L	W%
1981–82	Carlisle RLFC	0	0	0	0
1988	Hunslet	9	1	0	8	11
1988–90	Huddersfield	42	22	0	20	52
	Total	51	23	0	28	45
- Relatives: Francis Stephenson (son)

Nigel Stephenson (born 12 October 1950) is an English former professional rugby league footballer who played in the 1960s, 1970s and 1980s, and coached in the 1980s and 1990s. He played at representative level for England and Yorkshire, and at club level for Shaw Cross, Dewsbury (two spells), Bradford Northern, Carlisle, Wakefield Trinity (captain), York and Huddersfield, as a centre, and coached at club level for Hunslet and Huddersfield.

== Background ==
Nigel Stephenson was born in Dewsbury, West Riding of Yorkshire, England.

== Playing career ==
=== Championship final appearances ===
Stephenson played at centre, was captain, and scored a try, four goals and a drop goal in Dewsbury's 22–13 victory over Leeds in the Championship Final during the 1972–73 season at Odsal Stadium, Bradford on Saturday 19 May 1973.also won the championship with Bradford northern two years running 1980/81 1981/1982. second time as captain.

=== BBC2 Floodlit Trophy Final appearances ===
Stephenson played stand-off, and scored a goal in Dewsbury's 2–22 defeat by St. Helens in the 1975 BBC2 Floodlit Trophy Final during the 1975–76 season at Knowsley Road, St. Helens on Tuesday 16 December 1975.

=== John Player Trophy Final appearances ===
Stephenson played stand-off, and scored a drop goal in Bradford Northern's 6–0 victory over Widnes in the 1979–80 John Player Trophy Final during the 1979–80 season at Headingley, Leeds on Saturday 5 January 1980.

=== Career records ===
Stephenson holds Dewsbury's career goalscoring record, 863-goals scored during his two spells with the club 1967–78 and 1984–86.

=== Representative honours ===
Stephenson played at centre in England's 0–25 defeat by Australia in the 1975 Rugby League World Cup Final at Headingley, Leeds on Wednesday 12 November 1975.

Stephenson was selected for Yorkshire County XIII on ten occasions. and scored 9 tries and won the county championship a record 5 times along with the late David Topliss.

== Family ==
Nigel Stephenson is the father of the rugby league footballer Francis Stephenson, his other son James is a highly regarded Community Coach with Shaw Cross Sharks & Dewsbury Rams and in 2010 James was awarded the RFL Kirklees Coach of the Year Award for his efforts in rugby league development.

Nigel Stephenson is not related to fellow Dewsbury 1973 Rugby Football League Championship winner Mike "Stevo" Stephenson.
