= Mick Harrison (rugby league) =

English rugby league footballer (1946–2025)

Personal information
- Full name: Michael Harrison
- Born: 19 September 1946 Featherstone, West Yorkshire, England
- Died: 5 October 2025 (aged 79)

Playing information
- Position: Prop, Centre
Club
Years	Team	Pld	T	G	FG	P
1965–74	Hull FC	313	15	0	0	45
1974–82	Leeds	205	8	0	0	24
1982–83	Hull FC	7	0	0	0	0
	Total	525	23	0	0	69
Representative
Years	Team	Pld	T	G	FG	P
1967–73	Great Britain	7	0	0	0	0
1978	England	2	0	0	0	0

Michael Harrison (19 September 1946 – 5 October 2025) was an English professional rugby league footballer who played in the 1960s, 1970s and 1980s. He played at representative level for Great Britain and England, and at club level for Hull F.C. (two spells) and Leeds. Harrison was as a prop who occasionally played centre.

== Playing career ==
=== Challenge Cup Final appearances ===
Harrison played at prop in Leeds' 16-7 victory over Widnes in the 1977 Challenge Cup Final during the 1976–77 season at Wembley Stadium, London on Saturday 7 May 1977, in front of a crowd of 80,871, and played at prop in the 14-12 victory over St Helens in the 1978 Challenge Cup Final during the 1977–78 season at Wembley Stadium, London on Saturday 13 May 1978, in front of a crowd of 96,000.

=== County Cup Final appearances ===
Harrison played at prop in Hull FC's 7-8 defeat by Hull Kingston Rovers in the 1967 Yorkshire Cup Final during the 1967–68 season at Headingley, Leeds on Saturday 14 October 1967, played at prop in the 12-9 victory over Featherstone Rovers in the 1969 Yorkshire Cup Final during the 1969–70 season at Headingley, Leeds on Saturday 20 September 1969, played at prop in Leeds' 15-11 victory over Hull Kingston Rovers in the 1975 Yorkshire Cup Final during the 1975–76 season at Odsal Stadium, Bradford on Saturday 15 November 1975, and played at prop in the 8-7 victory over Hull Kingston Rovers in the 1980 Yorkshire Cup Final during the 1980–81 season at Fartown Ground, Huddersfield on Saturday 8 November 1980.

=== John Player Trophy Final appearances ===
Harrison played at centre in Hull FC's 12-4 victory over Hull Kingston Rovers in the 1981–82 John Player Trophy Final during the 1981–82 season at Headingley, Leeds on Saturday 23 January 1982.

=== International honours ===
Harrison won caps for England while at Leeds in 1978 against France and Wales. He represented Great Britain while at Hull in 1967 against France (2 caps), in 1971 against New Zealand (2 caps), in 1972 against France (2 caps) and in 1973 against Australia.

== Death ==
Harrison died on 5 October 2025, at the age of 79.
