= John Wood (rugby league) =

GB international rugby league footballers

Personal information
- Full name: John Wood
- Born: 1 April 1956 (age 69) Widnes, Lancashire, England

Playing information
- Height: 6 ft 1 in (1.85 m)
- Weight: 16 st 2 lb (103 kg)
- Position: Prop, Second-row
Club
Years	Team	Pld	T	G	FG	P
1973–77	Widnes	96	2
1977–79	Wigan	27	2	0	0	6
1980–82	Fulham RLFC	65	11	0	0	33
1982–83	Leigh
1983–84	Salford
1984–85	Widnes
	Total	188	15	0	0	39
Representative
Years	Team	Pld	T	G	FG	P
1976	Great Britain U-24	2	0	0	0	0
1977	Lancashire	1	0	0	0	0
1982	Great Britain	1	0	0	0	0

John Wood is an English former professional rugby league footballer who played in the 1970s and 1980s. He played at representative level for Great Britain, and at club level for Widnes (two spells), Wigan, Fulham RLFC, Leigh and Salford, as a prop or second-row.

== Playing career ==
=== International honours ===
John Wood won a cap for Great Britain while at Leigh in 1982 against France.

John Wood played at right-prop in Great Britain's 7–8 defeat by France in the friendly at Stadio Pier Luigi Penzo, Venice on Saturday 31 July 1982.

=== Challenge Cup Final appearances ===
John Wood played right-prop in Widnes' 5–20 defeat by St. Helens in the 1976 Challenge Cup Final during the 1975–76 season at Wembley Stadium, London on Saturday 8 May 1976.

=== Player's No.6 Trophy Final appearances ===
John Wood played right-prop in Widnes' 19–13 victory over Hull F.C. in the 1975–76 Player's No.6 Trophy Final during the 1975–76 season at Headingley, Leeds on Saturday 24 January 1976
