= 1975–76 Challenge Cup =

Rugby league competition

- Duration: 5 Rounds
- Number of teams: 32
- Highest attendance: 89,982
- Broadcast partners: BBC
- Winners: St Helens
- Runners-up: Widnes
- Lance Todd Trophy: Geoff Pimblett

The 1975–76 Challenge Cup was the 75th staging of rugby league's oldest knockout competition, the Challenge Cup. The final was contested by St Helens and Widnes at Wembley.

St Helens beat Widnes 20–5 at Wembley in front of a crowd of 89,982.

The winner of the Lance Todd Trophy was St Helens fullback, Geoff Pimblett.

This was St Helens’ fifth Cup final win in eight Final appearances.

== First round ==
| Date | Team one | Team two | Score |
|---|---|---|---|
| 14 Feb | Castleford | Salford | 3-25 |
| 14 Feb | Huddersfield | Leeds | 10-34 |
| 15 Feb | Bramley | Wigan | 5-10 |
| 15 Feb | Doncaster | Barrow | 13-9 |
| 15 Feb | Featherstone Rovers | Wakefield Trinity | 23-9 |
| 15 Feb | Halifax | Keighley | 9-13 |
| 15 Feb | Hull FC | St Helens | 3-5 |
| 15 Feb | Hull Kingston Rovers | Whitehaven | 21-12 |
| 15 Feb | Huyton | Oldham | 4-16 |
| 15 Feb | Leigh | Pointer Panthers | 37-8 |
| 15 Feb | New Hunslet | Blackpool | 17-12 |
| 15 Feb | Rochdale Hornets | Bradford Northern | 2-15 |
| 15 Feb | Warrington | Leigh Miners W. | 16-12 |
| 15 Feb | Widnes | Batley | 26-4 |
| 15 Feb | Workington Town | Swinton | 10-7 |
| 15 Feb | York | Dewsbury | 25-15 |

== Second round ==
| Date | Team one | Team two | Score |
|---|---|---|---|
| 28 Feb | Leeds | Bradford Northern | 30-12 |
| 29 Feb | Featherstone Rovers | Hull Kingston Rovers | 25-10 |
| 29 Feb | Keighley | Workington Town | 17-12 |
| 29 Feb | Leigh | Doncaster | 29-6 |
| 29 Feb | New Hunslet | Warrington | 4-17 |
| 29 Feb | Oldham | York | 6-5 |
| 29 Feb | Salford | St Helens | 11-17 |
| 29 Feb | Widnes | Wigan | 7-5 |

== Quarter-finals ==
| Date | Team one | Team two | Score |
|---|---|---|---|
| 13 Mar | Warrington | Widnes | 0-6 |
| 14 Mar | Featherstone Rovers | Leeds | 33-7 |
| 14 Mar | Keighley | Leigh | 13-7 |
| 14 Mar | St Helens | Oldham | 17-9 |

== Semi-finals ==
| Date | Team one | Team two | Score |
|---|---|---|---|
| 27 Mar | Widnes | Featherstone Rovers | 15-9 |
| 03 Apr | Keighley | St Helens | 4-5 |

== Final ==
8 May 1976

| St Helens | 20 – 5 | Widnes |
|---|---|---|
| Try: Glynn (2), Cunningham, Heaton; Goal: Pimblett (3); Drop goal: Pimblett (2) | Report | Goal: Dutton (2); Drop goal: Elwell |

Wembley, London
Attendance: 89,982
Referee: R. Moore (Wakefield)
Player of the Match: Geoff Pimblett

| FB | 1 | Geoff Pimblett |
| RW | 2 | Les Jones |
| RC | 3 | Eddie Cunningham |
| LC | 4 | Derek Noonan |
| LW | 5 | Roy Mathias |
| SO | 6 | Billy Benyon | (substituted off) 44' |
| SH | 7 | Jeff Heaton |
| PR | 8 | John Mantle | (substituted off) 78' |
| HK | 9 | Tony Karalius |
| PR | 10 | Kel Coslett (c) |
| SR | 11 | Eric Chisnall |
| SR | 12 | George Nicholls |
| LF | 13 | David Hull |
Substitutions:
| IC | 14 | Peter Glynn | (substituted on) 44' |
| IC | 15 | Mel James | (substituted on) 78' |
Coach:
Eric Ashton

| FB | 1 | Ray Dutton |
| RW | 2 | Alan Prescott | (substituted off) 64' |
| RC | 3 | Eric Hughes |
| LC | 4 | Mick George |
| LW | 5 | Dave Jenkins |
| SO | 6 | David Eckersley |
| SH | 7 | Reg Bowden (c) |
| PR | 8 | Nick Nelson |
| HK | 9 | Keith Elwell |
| PR | 10 | John Wood |
| SR | 11 | John Foran | (substituted off) 55' |
| SR | 12 | Mick Adams |
| LF | 13 | Doug Laughton |
Substitutions:
| IC | 14 | Dennis O'Neill | (substituted on) 64' |
| IC | 15 | Barry Sheridan | (substituted on) 55' |
Coach:
Frank Myler
