= Trevor Briggs =

Trevor Briggs may refer to:

- Trevor Briggs (rugby league, born 1946) (1946–2013), English rugby league player for Castleford
- Trevor Briggs (rugby league, born 1948) (1948–2012), English rugby league player for Leeds, Bramley, Keighley and Batley
