= Peter Flanagan =

British rugby league footballer (1941–2007)

Personal information
- Born: 22 January 1941 Hull, England
- Died: 8 January 2007 (aged 65) Hull, England

Playing information
- Position: Hooker
Club
Years	Team	Pld	T	G	FG	P
1960–75	Hull Kingston Rovers	411+3	56	13	0	194
1975–≥75	Hull FC	21
	Total	435	56	13	0	194
Representative
Years	Team	Pld	T	G	FG	P
1962–70	England	5	0	0	0	0
1962–70	Great Britain	14	1	0	0	3

Peter J. Flanagan (22 January 1941 – 8 January 2007), also known by the nickname of "Flash", was an English rugby league footballer who played in the 1960s and 1970s. He played at representative level as a hooker for Great Britain, England and Eastern Division, and at club level for Hull Kingston Rovers and Hull FC as a hooker.

== Background ==
Peter "Flash" Flanagan was born in Hull, East Riding of Yorkshire, England, and he died aged 65 in Hull, East Riding of Yorkshire, England.

== Playing career ==
Flanagan made 411 appearances plus 3 substitute appearances scoring 56-tries, and 13-conversions for 194-points, for Hull Kingston Rovers from 1960 to 1975 before finishing his career at neighbouring Hull FC. He was a member of the Great Britain team 14 times, making three tours and playing in the 1968 World Cup. He appeared in three Yorkshire Cup Finals with Hull Kingston Rovers, and was part of the team that won the Eastern Division Championship in 1962.

=== Eastern Division Championship Final appearances ===
Flanagan played hooker in Hull Kingston Rovers' 13–10 victory over Huddersfield in the Eastern Division Championship Final during the 1962–63 season at Headingley, Leeds on Saturday 10 November 1962.

=== Challenge Cup Final appearances ===
Flanagan played hooker in Hull Kingston Rovers' 5-13 defeat by Widnes in the 1963–64 Challenge Cup Final during the 1963–64 season at Wembley Stadium, London on Saturday 9 May 1964, in front of a crowd of 84,488.

=== County Cup Final appearances ===
Flanagan played hooker in Hull Kingston Rovers' 25-12 victory over Featherstone Rovers in the 1966 Yorkshire Cup Final during the 1966–67 season at Headingley, Leeds on Saturday 15 October 1966, played hooker in the 8-7 victory over Hull F.C. in the 1967 Yorkshire Cup Final during the 1967–68 season at Headingley, Leeds on Saturday 14 October 1967, and played hooker in the 11-7 victory over Castleford in the 1971 Yorkshire Cup Final during the 1971–72 season at Belle Vue, Wakefield on Saturday 21 August 1971.

=== Players No.6 Trophy Final appearances ===
Flanagan played hooker in Hull FC's 13-19 defeat by Widnes in the 1975–76 Player's No.6 Trophy Final during the 1975–76 season at Headingley, Leeds on Saturday 24 January 1976.
