= 1977–78 BBC2 Floodlit Trophy =

- Structure: Floodlit knockout championship
- Teams: 22
- Winners: Hull Kingston Rovers
- Runners-up: St. Helens

The 1977–78 BBC2 Floodlit Trophy was the thirteenth occasion on which the BBC2 Floodlit Trophy competition had been held. This year there was another new name added when Hull Kingston Rovers won the trophy by beating St. Helens in the final by the score of 26-11. The match was played at Craven Park (1), in Hull, East Riding of Yorkshire. The attendance was 10,099, and the receipts were £6,586.

== Background ==
The Rugby Football League's BBC2 Floodlit Trophy was a knock-out competition sponsored by the BBC and between rugby league clubs, entrance to which was conditional upon the club having floodlights. Most matches were played on an evening, and those of which the second half was televised, were played on a Tuesday evening.
Despite the competition being named as 'Floodlit', many matches took place during the afternoons and not under floodlights, and several of the entrants, including Barrow and Bramley did not have adequate lighting. And, when in 1973, due to the world oil crisis, the government restricted the use of floodlights in sport, all the matches, including the Trophy final, had to be played in the afternoon rather than at night.
The Rugby League season always (until the onset of "Summer Rugby" in 1996) ran from around August-time through to around May-time and this competition always took place early in the season, in the Autumn, with the final taking place in December (The only exception to this was when disruption of the fixture list was caused by inclement weather)

== Competition and results ==
This season Bramley, winners in 1973, did not enter the competition (they returned next year), but Batley joined the competition; thus the number of entrants remaining the same at twenty-two. The format remained as a knock-out competition from the preliminary round through to the final. The preliminary round involved twelve clubs, to reduce the numbers taking part in the competition proper to just sixteen.

=== Preliminary round ===
Involved 6 matches and 12 clubs

Game No	Fixture date	Home team	Score	Away team	Venue	Att	Rec	Notes	Ref
P	Sun 28 Aug 1977	Halifax	5-43	Leigh	Thrum Hall				
P	Tue 30 Aug 1977	Huddersfield	18-22	Wigan	Fartown				
P	Tue 30 Aug 1977	Salford	39-5	New Hunslet	The Willows				
P	Wed 7 Sep 1977	Keighley	25-2	Swinton	Lawkholme Lane				
P	Tue 13 Sep 1977	Bramley	4-14	Wakefield Trinity	McLaren Field			1	
P	Tue 27 Sep 1977	Leeds	16-13	Widnes	Headingley				

=== Round 1 – first round ===
Involved 8 matches and 16 clubs

Game No	Fixture date	Home team	Score	Away team	Venue	Att	Rec	Notes	Ref
1	Wed 28 Sep 1977	Barrow	6-10	Leigh	Craven Park				
2	Tue 4 Oct 1977	Whitehaven	5-6	Salford	Recreation Ground				
3	Wed 5 Oct 1977	Oldham	13-11	Warrington	Watersheddings				
4	Wed 5 Oct 1977	Wakefield Trinity	15-8	Keighley	Belle Vue				
5	Tue 11 Oct 1977	St. Helens	51-0	Dewsbury	Knowsley Road	2,754		2	
6	Wed 12 Oct 1977	Leeds	19-5	Rochdale Hornets	Headingley				
7	Tue 25 Oct 1977	Hull Kingston Rovers	18-7	Wigan	Craven Park (1)			3	
8	Tue 18 Oct 1977	Hull F.C.	A	Castleford	Boulevard			4	

=== Round 1 – first round – replay ===
Involved 8 matches and 16 clubs

Game No	Fixture date	Home team	Score	Away team	Venue	Att	Rec	Notes	Ref
8	Wed 26 Oct 1977	Hull F.C.	7-10	Castleford	Boulevard				

=== Round 2 – quarter finals ===
Involved 4 matches with 8 clubs

Game No	Fixture date	Home team	Score	Away team	Venue	Att	Rec	Notes	Ref
1	Tue 1 Nov 1977	Salford	29-10	Oldham	The Willows				
2	Tue 8 Nov 1977	Wakefield Trinity	14-22	Hull Kingston Rovers	Belle Vue				
3	Tue 15 Nov 1977	Castleford	14-10	Leeds	Wheldon Road				
4	Tue 22 Nov 1977	Leigh	7-14	St. Helens	Hilton Park	4,011			

=== Round 3 – semi-finals ===
Involved 2 matches and 4 clubs

Game No	Fixture date	Home team	Score	Away team	Venue	Att	Rec	Notes	Ref
1	Tue 29 Nov 1977	Castleford	5-23	Hull Kingston Rovers	Wheldon Road				
2	Tue 6 Dec 1977	St. Helens	7-4	Salford	Knowsley Road	3,500			

=== Final ===
Game No	Fixture date	Home team	Score	Away team	Venue	Att	Rec	Notes	Ref
1	Tuesday 13 December 1977	Hull Kingston Rovers	26-11	St. Helens	Craven Park (1)	10,099	6,586	3 5	

==== Teams and scorers ====
Hull Kingston Rovers	№	St. Helens
	teams	
Dave Hall	1	Geoff Pimblett
Ged Dunn	2	Les Jones
Mike Smith	3	Derek Noonan
Bernard Watson	4	Eddie Cunningham
Clive Sullivan	5	Peter Glynn
Steve Hartley	6	Bill Francis
Roger Millward	7	Ken Gwilliam
John Millington	8	Dave Chisnall
David Watkinson	9	Graham Liptrot
John Cunningham	10	Mel James
Phil Lowe	11	Mick Hope
Paul Rose	12	Tony Karalius
Len Casey	13	Harry Pinner
Roger Millward	Coach	Eric Ashton
26	score	11
11	HT	3
	Scorers	
	Tries	
Gerald "Ged" Dunn (2)	T	Eddie Cunningham (1)
Mike Smith (1)	T	Peter Glynn (2)
Clive Sullivan (1)	T	
Steve Hartley (1)	T	
Paul Rose (1)	T	
	Goals	
Dave Hall (4)	G	Peter Glynn (1)
Referee		Michael "Mick" J. Naughton (Widnes)

Scoring - Try = three (3) points - Goal = two (2) points - Drop goal = two (2) points

=== The road to success ===
This tree excludes any preliminary round fixtures

First round
Hull F.C.	7
Castleford	10
Leeds	19
Rochdale Hornets	5
Wakefield Trinity	15
Keighley	8
Hull KR	18
Wigan	7
Barrow	6
Leigh	10
St. Helens	51
Dewsbury	0
Whitehaven	5
Salford	6
Oldham	13
Warrington	11

Second round
Castleford	14
Leeds	10
Wakefield Trinity	14
Hull KR	22
Leigh	7
St. Helens	14
Salford	29
Oldham	10

Semi-finals
Castleford	5
Hull KR	23
St. Helens	7
Salford	4

Final
Hull KR	26
St. Helens	11

== Notes ==
1 * Batley join the competition and play first game in the competition, and first at home in the competition. It was also their one and only game as they did not enter the competition again
2 * At the time this highest score and greatest winning margin, never to be beaten
3 * This match was televised
4 * Abandoned after 25 Minutes due to Fog - Second Half was due to be Live on BBC 2
5 * Craven Park (1) was the home ground of Hull Kingston Rovers from 2 September 1922 to 9 April 1989. The final capacity was estimated to be under 10,000 although the record attendance was 22,282 set on 7 October 1922 in a match against local rivals Hull FC. The stadium was demolished in 1989 and a new supermarket constructed for the Co-op, and now occupied by Morrisons.

== See also ==
- 1977–78 Northern Rugby Football League season
- 1977 Lancashire Cup
- 1977 Yorkshire Cup
- BBC2 Floodlit Trophy
- Rugby league county cups
