= Tommy Cunningham (rugby league) =

Wales international rugby league footballer

Personal information
- Full name: Thomas Cunningham
- Born: 7 August 1956 (age 69) St. Helens, Lancashire, England

Playing information
- Position: Hooker
Club
Years	Team	Pld	T	G	FG	P
1974–78	St. Helens	3	0	0	0	0
1978–82	Warrington	30	6	0	0	18
	Total	33	6	0	0	18
Representative
Years	Team	Pld	T	G	FG	P
1979	Wales	2	0	0	0	0
- Relatives: Eddie Cunningham (brother); Keiron Cunningham (brother)

Thomas Cunningham (born 7 August 1956), is an English former professional rugby league footballer who played in the 1970s and 1980s. He played at representative level for Wales, and at club level for St. Helens and Warrington, as a hooker.

== Background ==
Tommy Cunningham was born in St. Helens, Lancashire, England.

== Playing career ==
=== International honours ===
Cunningham won caps for Wales while at Warrington 1979 (2?)-caps.

=== Notable tour matches ===
Tommy Cunningham played hooker in Warrington's 15–12 victory over Australia at Wilderspool Stadium, Warrington on Wednesday 11 October 1978.

== Genealogical Information ==
Tommy Cunningham is the brother of rugby league footballers Eddie Cunningham and Keiron Cunningham.
