= Graham Idle =

English rugby league footballer

Personal information
- Born: 10 March 1950 (age 75) Leeds, England

Playing information
- Position: Second-row, Loose forward
Club
Years	Team	Pld	T	G	FG	P
1969–75	Bramley	190+22	12	0	0	36
1975–80	Wakefield Trinity	166+4	12	0	0	36
1980–84	Bradford Northern	120+8	2	0	0	6
1984–85	Hunslet	45	2	0	0	8
1985–88	Rochdale Hornets	64	0	0	0	0
1988–89	Sheffield Eagles	17+2	0	0	0	0
1989–92	Doncaster	67	1	0	0	4
1992–93	Nottingham City	28	1	0	0	4
1993	Highfield	3	0	0	0	0
	Total	736	30	0	0	94
Representative
Years	Team	Pld	T	G	FG	P
1973–81	Yorkshire	3	0	0	0	0

Graham Idle (born 10 March 1950) is an English former professional rugby league footballer who played in the 1970s and 1980s. He played at club level for Bramley, Wakefield Trinity, Bradford Northern, Hunslet, Rochdale Hornets, Sheffield Eagles, Doncaster, Nottingham City and Highfield, as a second-row, or loose forward.

== Background ==
Graham Idle's birth was registered in Leeds district, West Riding of Yorkshire, England.

== Playing career ==
Idle made a total of 740 appearances during his career between 1969 and 1993 – the fifth highest total in British rugby league history.

=== Championship appearances ===
Graham Idle played in Bradford Northern's victory in the Championship during the 1980–81 season.

=== Challenge Cup Final appearances ===
Graham Idle played loose forward in Wakefield Trinity's 3-12 defeat by Widnes in the 1979 Challenge Cup Final during the 1978–79 season at Wembley Stadium, London on Saturday 5 May 1979, in front of a crowd of a crowd of 94,218.

=== County Cup Final appearances ===
Graham Idle played at second-row in Bradford Northern's 5-10 defeat by Castleford in the 1981 Yorkshire Cup Final during the 1981–82 season at Headingley, Leeds on Saturday 3 October 1981, and played at second-row in the 7-18 defeat by Hull F.C. in the 1982 Yorkshire Cup Final during the 1981–82 season at Elland Road, Leeds on Saturday 2 October 1982.

=== BBC2 Floodlit Trophy Final appearances ===
Graham Idle played at second-row in Bramley's 15-7 victory over Widnes in the 1973 BBC2 Floodlit Trophy Final during the 1973-74 season at Naughton Park, Widnes on Tuesday 18 December 1973.
