= Terry Robbins (rugby league) =

Wales international rugby league footballer

Personal information
- Full name: Terrance Richard Robbins
- Born: 28 July 1934 Merthyr Tydfil, Wales
- Died: 17 November 2015 (aged 81) Bacup, Lancashire, England

Playing information

Rugby union
Club
Years	Team	Pld	T	G	FG	P
1957–59	Swansea RFC

Rugby league
- Position: Second-row
Club
Years	Team	Pld	T	G	FG	P
1959–60	Hunslet	27	6	0	0	18
1960–62	Bradford Northern	34	4	0	0	12
≤1963–≥63	Bramley
	Total	61	10	0	0	30
Representative
Years	Team	Pld	T	G	FG	P
1963	Wales	1	0	0	0	0

Terrance Richard Robbins (28 July 1934 – 17 November 2015) was a Welsh rugby union, and professional rugby league footballer who played in the 1950s and 1960s. He played club level rugby union (RU) for Swansea RFC, and representative level rugby league (RL) for Wales, and at club level for Hunslet, Bradford Northern and Bramley, as a second-row.

== International honours ==
Robbins won a cap for Wales (RL) while at Bramley in 1963 against France.

== Outside of rugby ==
Terry Robbins was the landlord in the Leeds public houses; Fforde Greene, Roundhay Road, Harehills, the Compton Arms, Harehills, the Kings Arms, Meanwood Road, and the Welcome Inn, Tinshill which was the home of West Park Old Boys RUFC (later named West Park Bramhope RUFC, and now named West Park Leeds RUFC ).
