= David Hull (rugby league) =

English rugby league footballer

Personal information
- Born: 13 March 1951 (age 74); St Helens, Lancashire, England

Playing information
- Position: Centre, Second-row, Loose forward
Club
Years	Team	Pld	T	G	FG	P
1973–77	St Helens	105	16	0	0	48
1977–80	Widnes	93	15
1980–84	Fulham RLFC	50	6	0	0	22
	Total	248	37	0	0	70
Representative
Years	Team	Pld	T	G	FG	P
1979	Lancashire	1	0	0	0	0

David Hull (born 13 March 1951) is an English former professional rugby league footballer who played in the 1970s and 1980s. He played at club level for St Helens, Widnes and Fulham RLFC, as a centre, second-row or loose forward.

== Playing career ==
=== St Helens ===
Hull played at centre, and scored a try in St. Helens' 22-2 victory over Dewsbury in the 1975 BBC2 Floodlit Trophy Final during the 1975–76 season at Knowsley Road, St. Helens on Tuesday 16 December 1975.

Hull played loose forward in St. Helens' 20-5 victory over Widnes in the 1976 Challenge Cup Final during the 1975–76 season at Wembley Stadium, London on Saturday 8 May 1976.

Hull played loose forward in St. Helens 2-25 defeat by the 1975 NSWRFL season premiers, Eastern Suburbs Roosters in the unofficial 1976 World Club Challenge at Sydney Cricket Ground on Tuesday 29 June 1976.

=== Widnes ===
Hull was a substitute in the 12-3 victory over Wakefield Trinity in the 1979 Challenge Cup Final during the 1978–79 season at Wembley Stadium, London on Saturday 5 May 1979.

Hull appeared as a substitute (replacing second-row Alan Dearden) in Widnes' 30-2 victory over Workington Town in the 1978 Lancashire Cup Final during the 1978–79 season at Central Park, Wigan on Saturday 7 October 1978, and was an unused(?) substitute in the 11-0 victory over Workington Town in the 1979 Lancashire Cup Final during the 1979–80 season at The Willows, Salford on Saturday 8 December 1979.

Hull played at second-row in Widnes' 4-9 defeat by Warrington in the 1977–78 Players No.6 Trophy Final during the 1977–78 season at Knowsley Road, St. Helens on Saturday 28 January 1978, played at second-row, and scored a try in the 16-4 victory over Warrington in the 1978–79 John Player Trophy Final during the 1978–79 season at Knowsley Road, St. Helens on Saturday 28 April 1979, and played at second-row in the 0-6 defeat by Bradford Northern in the 1979–80 John Player Trophy Final during the 1979–80 season at Headingley, Leeds on Saturday 5 January 1980.
