= Eddie Cunningham =

GB & Wales international rugby league footballer

Personal information
- Full name: Edward Cunningham
- Born: 22 February 1951 (age 75) St. Helens, England

Playing information
- Position: Centre, Second-row, Loose forward
Club
Years	Team	Pld	T	G	FG	P
1969–74	Wigan	96+11	45	0	0	135
1975–79	St Helens	132+12	75	0	0	225
1979–80	Leeds	25+1	8	0	0	24
1980–83	Widnes	67	26	0	0	78
1985–86	Batley	15	3	0	0	12
	Total	359	157	0	0	474
Representative
Years	Team	Pld	T	G	FG	P
1975–78	Wales	8	2	0	0	6
1978	Great Britain	1	0	0	0	0
197?	Lancashire		0	0	0	0
- Relatives: Keiron Cunningham (brother); Tommy Cunningham (brother)

Edward Cunningham (born 22 February 1951) is a former professional rugby league footballer who played in the 1960s, 1970s and 1980s. He played at international level for Great Britain and Wales, and at club level for Wigan, St. Helens, Leeds, Widnes, and Batley, as a centre, second-row, or loose forward.

== Background ==
Eddie Cunningham was born in St. Helens, Lancashire, England.

== Playing career ==
=== Wigan ===
Cunningham played loose forward in Wigan's 19–9 victory over Salford in the 1973 Lancashire Cup Final during the 1973–74 season at Wilderspool Stadium, Warrington on Saturday 13 October 1973.

=== St Helens ===
Cunningham played at centre, and scored a try in St. Helens' 20–5 victory over Widnes in the 1976 Challenge Cup Final during the 1975–76 season at Wembley Stadium, London on Saturday 8 May 1976, in front of a crowd of 89,982.

Cunningham played at centre in St. Helens 2–25 defeat by the 1975 NSWRFL season premiers, Eastern Suburbs Roosters in the unofficial 1976 World Club Challenge at Sydney Cricket Ground on Tuesday 29 June 1976.

Cunningham played at centre, and scored try in St. Helens' 11–26 defeat by Hull Kingston Rovers in the 1977 BBC2 Floodlit Trophy Final during the 1977–78 season at Craven Park, Kingston upon Hull on Tuesday 13 December 1977, and played at centre in the 7–13 defeat by Widnes in the 1978 BBC2 Floodlit Trophy Final during the 1978–79 season at Knowsley Road, St. Helens on Tuesday 12 December 1978.

=== Widnes ===
After spending one season at Leeds, Cunningham was signed by Widnes in August 1980 for a fee of £20,000.

Cunningham played at centre in Widnes' 18–9 victory over Hull Kingston Rovers in the 1981 Challenge Cup Final during the 1980–81 season at Wembley Stadium, London on Saturday 2 May 1981, in front of a crowd of 92,496, played at centre, and scored 2-tries, and was named Man of the match winning the Lance Todd Trophy in the 14–14 draw with Hull F.C. in the 1982 Challenge Cup Final during the 1981–82 season at Wembley Stadium, London on Saturday 1 May 1982, in front of a crowd of 92,147, and played at centre in the 9–18 defeat by Hull F.C. in the 1982 Challenge Cup Final replay during the 1981–82 season at Elland Road, Leeds on Wednesday 19 May 1982, in front of a crowd of 41,171.

Cunningham played at centre in Widnes' defeat by Leigh in the 1981 Lancashire Cup Final during the 1981–82 season at Central Park, Wigan on Saturday 26 September 1981.

=== International honours ===
Eddie Cunningham won caps for Wales while at St. Helens in the 1975 Rugby League World Cup against England, Australia, England, and Australia, in 1977 against England, in 1978 against France, England, and Australia, and won a cap for Great Britain while at St. Helens in 1978 against Australia.

== Genealogical information ==
Eddie Cunningham is the father of St. Helens and Widnes Vikings rugby league footballer Gareth Cunningham, and the brother of rugby league footballers Tommy Cunningham and Keiron Cunningham.
