= Trevor Briggs (rugby league, born 1948) =

English rugby league footballer

Personal information
- Born: third ¼ 1948 Kippax, West Yorkshire, England
- Died: 2012 (aged 63–64) Kippax, West Yorkshire, England

Playing information
- Position: Stand-off, Scrum-half
Club
Years	Team	Pld	T	G	FG	P
1970–71	Leeds	7	2	0	0	6
1971–79	Bramley	232+8	30	3	0	96
1979–82	Batley	80	6	0	2	20
1982–84	Keighley	60	8	0	1	25
	Total	387	46	3	3	147

Trevor Briggs (third ¼ 1948 – 2012) was an English professional rugby league footballer who played in the 1960s and 1970s. He played at club level for Leeds, Bramley, Keighley and Batley, as a stand-off, or scrum-half.

== Background ==
Trevor Briggs' birth was registered in Leeds district, West Riding of Yorkshire, England.

== Playing career ==
Briggs played stand-off in Bramley's 15–7 victory over Widnes in the 1973 BBC2 Floodlit Trophy Final during the 1973–74 season at Naughton Park, Widnes on Tuesday 18 December 1973.

He debuted for Batley in August 1979.
