= Harry Sunderland Trophy =

Awarded annually to the man of the match in the Super League Grand Final

- Sport: Rugby league
- Competition: First Division Final (1965–1973); Premiership Final (1974–1997); Super League Grand Final (1998–2023)
- Country: United Kingdom
- Presented by: Rugby League Writers and Broadcasters' Association

History
- First award: 1965
- Editions: 59
- Final award: 2023
- First winner: Terry Fogerty
- Most recent: Jake Wardle

The Harry Sunderland Trophy was awarded annually to the man of the match in the Super League Grand Final and its predecessors, the RFL First Division Final and the Premiership Final, between 1965 and 2023. Named after Harry Sunderland, who was an Australian rugby league football administrator in both Australia and the United Kingdom, the Trophy was first awarded in the Rugby Football League Championship Final of the 1964–65 season following Sunderland's death.

After the 1972–73 season the play-off system was dropped as the League went to two divisions. The Trophy's use was continued in the Rugby League Premiership and Super League Premiership finals until Super League III, when a play-off system was re-introduced to determine the Champions through the Grand Final.

The trophy's winner is determined by the Rugby League Writers' Association and presented on the field immediately following the conclusion of the match. In 2011, Rob Burrow of Leeds Rhinos became the first player to achieve the unanimous votes of all 37 judges when winning the award.

In February 2024 the Rugby Football League announced that the trophy will be replaced by the Rob Burrow Award. In announcing the new award, RFL vice-president Trevor Hunt said "I am certain that rugby league players and supporters will agree that the name of Rob Burrow is a fitting one to recognise, ... We believe that now is the right time to make a change that brings the award recognition into the new era, and Rob Burrow is the right man."

== Recipients ==
Season	Awarded in	Recipient	Team
1964–65	Championship Final	Terry Fogerty	Halifax
1965–66	Championship Final	Albert Halsall	St. Helens
1966–67	Championship Final	Ray Owen	Wakefield
1967–68	Championship Final	Gary Cooper	Wakefield
1968–69	Championship Final	Bev Risman	Leeds
1969–70	Championship Final	Frank Myler	St. Helens
1970–71	Championship Final	Bill Ashurst†	Wigan
1971–72	Championship Final	Terry Clawson	Leeds
1972–73	Championship Final	Mike Stephenson	Dewsbury
1973–74	Premiership Final	Barry Philbin	Warrington
1974–75	Premiership Final	Mel Mason	Leeds
1975–76	Premiership Final	George Nicholls	St. Helens
1976–77	Premiership Final	Geoff Pimblett	St. Helens
1977–78	Premiership Final	Bob Haigh	Bradford Northern
1978–79	Premiership Final	Kevin Dick	Leeds
1979–80	Premiership Final	Mal Aspey	Widnes
1980–81	Premiership Final	Len Casey	Hull KR
1981–82	Premiership Final	Mick Burke	Widnes
1982–83	Premiership Final	Tony Myler	Widnes
1983–84	Premiership Final	John Dorahy	Hull KR
1984–85	Premiership Final	Harry Pinner	St. Helens
1985–86	Premiership Final	Les Boyd	Warrington
1986–87	Premiership Final	Joe Lydon	Wigan
1987–88	Premiership Final	David Hulme	Widnes
1988–89	Premiership Final	Alan Tait	Widnes
1989–90	Premiership Final	Alan Tait	Widnes
1990–91	Premiership Final	Greg Mackey	Hull
1991–92	Premiership Final	Andy Platt	Wigan
1992–93	Premiership Final	Chris Joynt	St. Helens
1993–94	Premiership Final	Sam Panapa	Wigan
1994–95	Premiership Final	Kris Radlinski	Wigan
1996	Premiership Final	Andrew Farrell	Wigan
1997	Premiership Final	Andrew Farrell	Wigan
1998	Grand Final	Jason Robinson	Wigan
1999	Grand Final	Henry Paul†	Bradford
2000	Grand Final	Chris Joynt	St. Helens
2001	Grand Final	Michael Withers	Bradford
2002	Grand Final	Paul Deacon†	Bradford
2003	Grand Final	Stuart Reardon	Bradford
2004	Grand Final	Matt Diskin	Leeds
2005	Grand Final	Leon Pryce	Bradford
2006	Grand Final	Paul Wellens	St. Helens
2007	Grand Final	Rob Burrow	Leeds
2008	Grand Final	Lee Smith	Leeds
2009	Grand Final	Kevin Sinfield	Leeds
2010	Grand Final	Thomas Leuluai	Wigan
2011	Grand Final	Rob Burrow	Leeds
2012	Grand Final	Kevin Sinfield	Leeds
2013	Grand Final	Blake Green	Wigan
2014	Grand Final	James Roby	St. Helens
2015	Grand Final	Danny McGuire	Leeds
2016	Grand Final	Liam Farrell	Wigan
2017	Grand Final	Danny McGuire	Leeds
2018	Grand Final	Stefan Ratchford†	Warrington
2019	Grand Final	Luke Thompson	St. Helens
2020	Grand Final	James Roby	St. Helens
2021	Grand Final	Kevin Naiqama	St. Helens
2022	Grand Final	Jonny Lomax	St. Helens
2023	Grand Final	Jake Wardle	Wigan

† = denotes a player who won the trophy but played on the losing team in the final.

== Winners by club ==
Club	Awards (winners)
Bradford Bulls	6 (6)
Dewsbury	1 (1)
Halifax	1 (1)
Hull F.C.	1 (1)
Hull Kingston Rovers	2 (2)
Leeds Rhinos	12 (9)
St Helens	13 (11)
Wakefield Trinity	2 (2)
Warrington Wolves	3 (3)
Widnes Vikings	6 (5)
Wigan Warriors	12 (11)

Seven players have been awarded trophy twice.

== See also ==
- Clive Churchill Medal – corresponding award for the NRL Grand Final
- Karyn Murphy Medal – corresponding award for the NRLW Grand Final
- Lance Todd Trophy – corresponding award for Rugby Football League Challenge Cup final
