= McLaren Field =

Rugby league stadium in Leeds, England

- Interactive map of McLaren Field
- Location: Bramley, Leeds
- Coordinates: 53.8075°N 1.6255°W
- Owner: Bramley RLFC
- Operator: Bramley RLFC
- Capacity: 7,500

Construction
- Opened: 1965
- Closed: 1995
- Demolished: 1996

McLaren Field was a rugby league stadium in Bramley, Leeds, England. It was the home of Bramley R.L.F.C. from 1965 to 1995. The ground was also used as a home base for several years by the Leeds-based American football team Leeds Cougars of the British American Football League.

== History ==
From the late 19th century Bramley played at the Barley Mow ground. The land adjacent to the ground was owned by Edith McLaren, widow of the managing director of Leeds engineering firm J&H McLaren & Co. Despite several approaches by Bramley, Mrs McLaren would not sell the land to the club but after her death in 1958 she bequeathed the field to the club on condition that any development was named after her.

The club took the opportunity to develop a new stadium on the field and named it McLaren Field, and moved into the new stadium in 1965. The ground was home to the club for the next 30 years but by the early 1990s considerable improvements were needed which the club could not afford so in 1995 Bramley left McLaren Field and the ground was sold.

== Current use ==
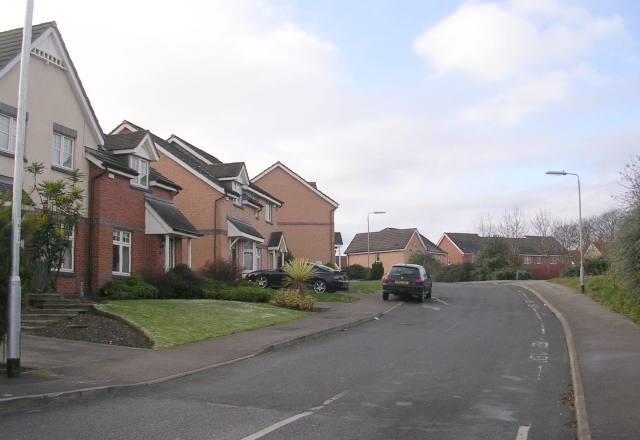
Housing in McLaren Fields

The ground was demolished and a new housing estate called McLaren Fields was built on the site.

The only part of the ground that remains is the club house that stood behind the posts at what would have been the entrance of the ground. It is currently used as a nursery.
