= Robert Bartlett (rugby league) =

Australian rugby league footballer

Bob Bartlett

Personal information
- Full name: Robert Bruce Bartlett
- Born: 15 January 1927; Lithgow, New South Wales, Australia
- Died: 19 February 2010 (aged 83); Wollongong, New South Wales, Australia

Playing information
- Position: Wing, Centre
Club
Years	Team	Pld	T	G	FG	P
	Lithgow R.L.F.C.
≤1948–49	Bramley
1949–52	Leeds	90	33	0	0	99
1958–60	Manly Warringah	3	0	0	0	0
	Total	93	33	0	0	99
Representative
Years	Team	Pld	T	G	FG	P
1949	British Empire XIII	1	0	0	0	0
1949–50	Other Nationalities	3	1	0	0	3
1953	NSW Country Firsts	2	1	0	0	3

Robert Bruce "Bob" Bartlett (15 January 1927 – 19 February 2010) was an Australian professional rugby league footballer who played in the 1940s and 1950s, and Lawn Bowls player. He played representative level rugby league (RL) for British Empire XIII, Other Nationalities and New South Wales Country Firsts, and at club level for Bramley, Leeds and Manly Warringah Sea Eagles, as a wing, or centre, and representative level Lawn Bowls for New South Wales, and at club level for Wiseman Park Wollongong City Bowling Club, winning numerous titles and events, including Australian titles.

== Background ==
Bartlett was born in Lithgow, New South Wales, and he died aged 83 in Wollongong, New South Wales.

== Playing career ==
=== International honours ===
Bartlett represented British Empire XIII (RL) while at Leeds in the 10–23 defeat by France at Stade Chaban-Delmas, Bordeaux on Thursday 26 May 1949, and won caps for Other Nationalities (RL) while at Leeds in the 7–13 defeat by England at Derwent Park, Workington on Monday 19 September 1949, the 3–8 defeat by France at Stade Vélodrome, Marseille on Sunday 15 January 1950, and the 3–16 defeat by France at Stade Chaban-Delmas, Bordeaux on Sunday 10 December 1950.

=== State honours ===
Bartlett represented NSW Country Firsts (RL) in the 28–27 victory over New South Wales Town Firsts at Sydney Cricket Ground on Saturday 16 May 1953.

=== County League appearances ===
Bartlett played in Leeds' victory in the Yorkshire League during the 1950–51 season.

=== Club career ===
Bartlett was transferred with Dennis Murphy from Bramley to Leeds in exchange for Joseph "Joe" Hulme and Dennis Warrior, he made his début for Leeds against York at Clarence Street, York on Saturday 29 January 1949.

== Australian Sports Medal ==
Bartlett's sporting achievements were rewarded with an Australian Sports Medal in 2000.

== Funeral ==
Bartlett's funeral took place at St Francis Xavier's Cathedral, Wollongong on Tuesday 23 February 2010, and was attended by family, friends, and dignitaries including former Lord Mayor of the City of Wollongong Alex Darling, former rugby league footballers Keith Barnes, Allan Fitzgibbon and Gus Miller, and rugby league administrators Bob Millward (father of Ian Millward), and Peter Newell (Illawarra Steelers chairman).
