= Dennis Warrior =

English rugby league footballer (1922–2011)

Personal information
- Full name: Dennis Warrior
- Born: 1922 Leeds district, England
- Died: 8 July 2011 (aged 89) Derbyshire, England

Playing information
- Position: Centre
Club
Years	Team	Pld	T	G	FG	P
1940–48	Leeds	65	25			75
194?–4?	→Castleford (guest)
1949–55	Bramley
	Total	65	25	0	0	75

Dennis Warrior (1922 – 9 July 2011) was an English professional rugby league footballer who played in the 1940s and 1950s. He played at club level for Leeds, Castleford (as a wartime guest) and Bramley as a centre.

== Background ==
Dennis Warrior was born in 1922. His birth was registered in Leeds district, West Riding of Yorkshire, England, he was a pupil at Burley National School (now Burley St. Matthias school), and in c. 1933 the school rugby league team won the Goldthorpe Cup (named after Goldthorpe brothers; William Goldthorpe, James Goldthorpe, John Goldthorpe, Albert Goldthorpe, Walter Goldthorpe (father of association footballer (soccer), Ernest "Ernie" Goldthorpe).

== Playing career ==
=== Club career ===
Warrior's career at Leeds was interrupted by World War II. In the 1948–49 season, he was transferred from Leeds to Bramley with Joseph "Joe" Hulme in a part-exchange for Robert "Bob" Bartlett and Dennis Murphy.

=== Testimonial match ===
Warrior's testimonial match took place at Bramley in 1955.

== Personal life and death ==
Dennis Warrior's marriage to Mildred (née Fox) was registered in Leeds district during third ¼ 1945, the birth of their daughter Christine Warrior was registered in Leeds district during third ¼ 1946.

Warrior died in Derbyshire on 9 July 2011, at the age of 89.
