= George Nicholls (rugby league) =

Former GB & England international rugby league footballer

Personal information
- Born: 14 May 1944 (age 81) Widnes, Lancashire, England

Playing information
- Position: Forward
Club
Years	Team	Pld	T	G	FG	P
1966–73	Widnes	218	46	1	0	140
1973–81	St Helens	272	41	0	0	123
1981–82	Cardiff City	28	5	0	0	15
1982–83	Salford	26	1	0	0	3
	Total	544	93	1	0	281
Representative
Years	Team	Pld	T	G	FG	P
1969–79	Lancashire	16	4	0	0	12
1971–79	Great Britain	29	2	0	0	6
1975–78	England	11	1	0	0	3

George Nicholls (born 14 May 1944) is an English former professional rugby league footballer who played in the 1970s and 1980s. A Great Britain and England international representative forward, he played his club rugby for English sides Widnes and St Helens. Eventually becoming a St Helens R.F.C. Hall of Fame inductee, he also became the first player to win the Man of Steel Award, Harry Sunderland Trophy and Lance Todd Trophy with the club. With Great Britain, Nicholls also won the 1972 Rugby League World Cup.

== Background ==
George Nicholls was born in Widnes, Lancashire, England.

== Playing career ==
=== Widnes ===
Born in Widnes, Lancashire on 14 May 1944, George Nicholls commenced playing professionally for Rugby Football League club Widnes in 1966. He played for Widnes at prop in their 8-15 defeat by Wigan in the 1971 Lancashire Cup Final at Knowsley Road, St. Helens on Saturday 28 August 1971.

He played at loose forward in Widnes' 0-5 defeat by Leigh in the 1972 BBC2 Floodlit Trophy Final at Central Park, Wigan on Tuesday 19 December 1972.

=== St Helens ===
The St Helens club acquired Nicholls' services in 1973 for £9,000. He played for them at second-row in their 22-2 victory over Dewsbury in the 1975 BBC2 Floodlit Trophy Final at Knowsley Road, St. Helens on Tuesday 16 December 1975. In the 1975–76 Challenge Cup Final Nicholls helped the St Helens side to victory. Nicholls played at second-row in St. Helens' 2-25 defeat by the 1975 NSWRFL season premiers, Eastern Suburbs Roosters in the unofficial 1976 World Club Challenge at Sydney Cricket Ground on Tuesday 29 June 1976.

In the 1978 Challenge Cup Final Nicholls was in the St Helens team which lost 14-12 to Leeds, but he won the Lance Todd Trophy. That year Nicholls was also voted the best player in the Championship, claiming the second-ever Man of Steel Award. The Open Rugby inaugural World XIII was revealed in June 1978 and included Nicholls. Nicholls played left-second-row in the 7-13 defeat by Widnes in the 1978 BBC2 Floodlit Trophy Final at Knowsley Road, St. Helens on Tuesday 12 December 1978.

=== International ===
While at Widnes, Nicholls was selected to play at loose forward for the Great Britain team who retained the 1972 World Cup.

On the 1979 tour, he was named as Great Britain's captain following an injury to Doug Laughton in the first Test against Australia.

== Honours ==
Club

- Championship: 1974–75
- Challenge Cup: 1975–76
- Premiership: 1975–76, 1976–77

Representative

- Rugby League World Cup: 1972

Individual

- Harry Sunderland Trophy: 1976
- Lance Todd Trophy: 1978
- Man of Steel Award: 1978
- Open Rugby World XIII: 1978
