= Geoff Pimblett =

England international rugby league footballer

Personal information
- Full name: Geoffrey Pimblett
- Born: 11 May 1944 St Helens, Merseyside, England
- Died: 19 February 2018 (aged 73)

Playing information

Rugby league
- Position: Fullback
Club
| Years | Team | Pld | T | G | FG | P |
|---|---|---|---|---|---|---|
| 1971–79 | St Helens | 365 | 48 | 608 | 28 | 1388 |
Representative
| Years | Team | Pld | T | G | FG | P |
| | Lancashire | 2 |
| 1978 | England | 1 | 1 | 9 | 0 | 21 |

Rugby union
Club
| Years | Team | Pld | T | G | FG | P |
|---|---|---|---|---|---|---|
| | St Helens |
Representative
| Years | Team | Pld | T | G | FG | P |
| | Lancashire |
- Relatives: Josh Simm (grandson)

Geoffrey Pimblett (11 May 1944 – 19 February 2018), also known by the nickname of "Pimmer" was an English professional rugby league and rugby union footballer whose career rose to prominence in the 1970s. He played for St Helens as a goal-kicking fullback and captain, and also represented England internationally. He was the first player to win both the Lance Todd and the Harry Sunderland trophies.

== Playing career ==
=== Premiership Final appearances ===
Pimblett played fullback, and scored three goals in St. Helens 15–2 victory over the Salford in the Premiership Final during the 1975–76 season at Station Road, Swinton on Saturday 22 May 1976, he played, and was man of the match winning the Harry Sunderland Trophy in the 32–20 victory over Warrington in the Premiership Final during the 1976–77 season at Station Road, Swinton on Saturday 28 May 1977, he became the first player to have received both the Lance Todd Trophy and Harry Sunderland Trophy.

=== Challenge Cup Final appearances ===
Pimblett played fullback in St. Helens' 16–13 victory over Leeds in the 1972 Challenge Cup Final during the 1971–72 season at Wembley Stadium, London on Saturday 13 May 1972, played fullback, scored three conversions and 2-drop goals, and was man of the match winning the Lance Todd Trophy in the 20–5 victory over Widnes in the 1976 Challenge Cup Final during the 1975–76 season at Wembley Stadium, London on Saturday 8 May 1976.

=== World Club Challenge appearances ===
Pimblett played fullback, and scored a goal in St. Helens 2–25 defeat by the 1975 NSWRFL season premiers, Eastern Suburbs Roosters in the unofficial 1976 World Club Challenge at Sydney Cricket Ground on Tuesday 29 June 1976.

=== BBC2 Floodlit Trophy Final appearances ===
Pimblett played fullback in St. Helens' 8–2 victory over Rochdale Hornets in the 1971 BBC2 Floodlit Trophy Final during the 1971-72 season at Headingley, Leeds on Tuesday 14 December 1971, played fullback, and scored two goals in the 22–2 victory over Dewsbury in the 1975 BBC2 Floodlit Trophy Final during the 1975-76 season at Knowsley Road, St. Helens on Tuesday 16 December 1975, played fullback in the 26–11 defeat by Hull Kingston Rovers in the 1977 BBC2 Floodlit Trophy Final during the 1977–78 season at Craven Park, Hull on Tuesday 13 December 1977, and played fullback, and scored two goals in the 13–7 defeat by Widnes in the 1978 BBC2 Floodlit Trophy Final during the 1978–79 season at Knowsley Road, St. Helens on Tuesday 12 December 1978.

=== Club career ===
By profession, Geoff Pimblett was a history teacher at Grange Park (later merged with Rivington to become Broadway High, later absorbed by Cowley School), he signed for St. Helens from rugby union with St. Helens RUFC (now named Liverpool St Helens F.C.) in early 1971 aged 26. Initially playing somewhat of a utility back role with the club, he soon established himself at fullback, and later, as goal-kicker.

=== International honours ===
Pimblett played fullback, and scored a try, and 9-goals for England while at St Helens' in the 60–13 victory over Wales in the 1978 European Championship at Knowsley Road, St Helens on Sunday 28 May 1978, with 9-goals he set a new record for most goals in a match for England.

== Retirement and death ==
After retiring, Geoff Pimblett became the president of the Saints' Past Players Association. He died on 19 February 2018 at the age of 73.

His grandson Josh Simm is a professional player with St. Helens.
