= Roy Mathias =

GB & Wales dual-code international rugby footballer

Personal information
- Born: 2 September 1949 (age 75); Llanelli, Wales

Playing information

Rugby union
- Position: Wing
Club
Years	Team	Pld	T	G	FG	P
	Felinfoel RFC
	Llanelli RFC
	Total	0	0	0	0	0
Representative
Years	Team	Pld	T	G	FG	P
1970	Wales	1	0	0	0	0

Rugby league
- Position: Wing, Second-row, Loose forward
Club
Years	Team	Pld	T	G	FG	P
1972–83	St. Helens	411	218	0	0	654
1984	Bridgend	5	0	0	0	0
	Total	416	218	0	0	654
Representative
Years	Team	Pld	T	G	FG	P
1975–81	Wales	20	2	0	0	6
1979	Great Britain	1	0	0	0	0

Roy Mathias (born 2 September 1949) is a Welsh dual-code international rugby union and professional rugby league, and footballer who played in the 1960s, 1970s and 1980s. He played representative level rugby union (RU) for Wales, and at club level for Felinfoel RFC and Llanelli RFC, as a wing, and representative level rugby league (RL) for Great Britain and Wales, and at club level for St. Helens and Cardiff City (Bridgend) Blue Dragons, as a wing, or loose forward.

== Background ==
Mathias was born in Llanelli, Wales.

== Rugby union career ==
Mathias won a cap playing Right-Wing for Wales (RU) while at Llanelli RFC in the 11–6 victory over France at Cardiff Arms Park on Saturday 4 April 1970.

== Rugby league career ==
=== International honours ===
Mathias won caps for Wales (RL) while at St. Helens in the 1975 Rugby League World Cup against France, England, Australia and New Zealand, and won a cap for Great Britain (RL) while at St. Helens against Australia on the 1979 Great Britain Lions tour of Australia and New Zealand.

=== World Club Challenge Final appearances ===
Roy Mathias played on the wing in St. Helens' 2–25 defeat by the 1975 NSWRFL season premiers, Eastern Suburbs Roosters in the unofficial 1976 World Club Challenge at Sydney Cricket Ground on Tuesday 29 June 1976.

=== Challenge Cup Final appearances ===
Roy Mathias played on the wing in St. Helens' 20–5 victory over Widnes in the 1976 Challenge Cup Final during the 1975–76 season at Wembley Stadium, London on Saturday 8 May 1976.

=== County Cup Final appearances ===
Roy Mathias appeared as a substitute (replacing Prop Gary Bottell) in St. Helens 0–16 defeat by Warrington in the 1982 Lancashire Cup Final during the 1982–83 season at Central Park, Wigan on Saturday 23 October 1982.

=== BBC2 Floodlit Trophy Final appearances ===
Roy Mathias played on the wing and scored two tries in St. Helens' 22–2 victory over Dewsbury in the 1975 BBC2 Floodlit Trophy Final during the 1975–76 season at Knowsley Road, St. Helens on Tuesday 16 December 1975, and played on the wing in the 7–13 defeat by Widnes in the 1978 BBC2 Floodlit Trophy Final during the 1978–79 season at Knowsley Road, St. Helens on Tuesday 12 December 1978. The record for the most tries in a BBC2 Floodlit Trophy Final is two tries, and is jointly held by; Roy Mathias, Peter Glynn, Gerald Dunn and Stuart Wright.

== Honoured at St. Helens R.F.C. ==
Roy Mathias is a St Helens R.F.C. Hall of Fame inductee.
