= Anthony Cheshire =

Australian scientist and public servant

Anthony Cheshire is a scientist and academic living and working in South Australia. Over his professional career he has served as the Head, Department of Botany in the University of Adelaide (1994-1998), as the Chief Scientist of SARDI (South Australian Research and Development Institute) Aquatic Sciences division (2000-2004) and as Director Research and Development of SARDI (2005). Over the course of his career his scientific research has focussed on understanding and measuring human impacts on the natural environment with a particular focus on the development of methods to assess the health and anthropogenic impacts in coastal marine environments.

Earlier in his career Anthony Cheshire worked as a research scientist at the Australian Institute of Marine Science (AIMS 1986-1989) and as an Academic in the Department of Botany at the University of Adelaide (1989-2000). In more recent years he has moved into the private sector although he has held numerous Adjunct, Affiliate and Advisory roles with South Australian Universities and Government Departments (including Adjunct and Affiliate appointments as Professor with both the Flinders University of South Australia and with the University of Adelaide).

His research work has spanned a number of key areas and initiatives including the ecology and ecophysiology of temperate and tropical macro-algae, the ecophysiology of tropical corals and sponges and the impact of aquaculture on coastal systems with a significant focus on the development of the state's Southern bluefin tuna seacage aquaculture sector. He has also participated in various scientific expeditions one of which resulted in the discovery of 8 new species of jellyfish collected from the Great Australian Bight (including the eponymous Amphinema cheshirei which was named after Anthony Cheshire who led a research expedition to the Nuyts archipelago in 2002).

In 2009 Anthony Cheshire led an international team of coastal scientists in a project that developed methods to assess marine litter (marine debris) in both coastal and open ocean environments. This work, funded by the United Nations Environment Programme (UNEP) in collaboration with the International Oceanographic Commission (IOC), has been published and forms the backbone of many national and trans-national marine debris survey programs.

== Ecology and ecophysiology of marine macro-algae ==
Cheshire and his students worked across a range of macro-algal systems including studies on the southern bull-kelp (Durvillaea potatorum) as well as numerous studies on the production ecology of kelp and fucoid dominated systems in South Australia. This work involved the development of novel technologies for quantifying the in-situ photosynthetic rates by macro-algal including both mixed-fucoid and turf algal communities. In addition the work involved assessing anthropogenic impacts on coastal macro-algal communities from impacts such as beach sand replenishment dredging and degraded coastal water quality.

In more recent years Cheshire has focussed on the improved utilisation of macro-algal resources including the challenges in developing a macro-algal industry in Australia.

== Southern bluefin tuna research ==
A substantial proportion of Cheshire's research work focused on the environmental impacts of tuna farming in Spencer Gulf. Subjects included early investigations of the environmental effect of tuna seacages, measurement and modeling of nitrogen loads, sediment geochemistry, developing a methodology for assessing seabed impacts, nutrient influence on the seabed, waste mitigation, oxygen availability in sea cages, net fouling communities and synthetic anti-fouling treatments, and regional monitoring systems. He also researched means of lowering the cost of environment assessments for the tuna aquaculture sector and helped improve net designs to allow Great white sharks that enter sea-cages by leaping or biting their way in to be released without harm.
