= Arthur Keegan =

GB & England international rugby league footballer and coach

Personal information
- Born: 6 November 1938; Dewsbury, Yorkshire, England
- Died: 3 November 2008 (aged 69); Wakefield, Yorkshire, England

Playing information
- Position: Fullback
Club
Years	Team	Pld	T	G	FG	P
1958–71	Hull F.C.	365	31	318	0	729
1971–76	Bramley	135	21	71	0	205
1976–77	Batley	6	0	0	0	0
	Total	506	52	389	0	934
Representative
Years	Team	Pld	T	G	FG	P
1963–69	Yorkshire	13
1969–70	England	2	0	0	0	0
1966–69	Great Britain	9	1	5	0	13

Coaching information
Club
Years	Team	Gms	W	D	L	W%
1973–76	Bramley
Representative
Years	Team	Gms	W	D	L	W%
1980–81	Yorkshire

Arthur Keegan (6 November 1938 – 3 November 2008), also known by the nickname of "Ollie", was an English professional rugby league footballer who played in the 1950s, 1960s and 1970s, and coached in the 1970s and 1980s. He played at representative level for Great Britain, England and Yorkshire, and at club level for West Town Boys ARLFC (in Dewsbury), Hull F.C., Bramley and Batley, as a goal-kicking fullback, and was captain of Hull between 1965 and 1971. He coached at representative level for Yorkshire, and at club level for Bramley, after serving in the Duke of Wellington's Regiment.

== Background ==
Arthur Keegan was born in Dewsbury, West Riding of Yorkshire, England, and he died aged 69 in Wakefield, West Yorkshire, England.

== Playing career ==
=== Hull ===
Keegan played at fullback, and scored 1-conversion, and 4-penalty goals in Hull F.C.'s 13–30 defeat by Wigan in the 1958–59 Challenge Cup Final during the 1958–59 season at Wembley Stadium, London on Saturday 9 May 1959.

Keegan played fullback in Hull F.C.'s 7–8 defeat by Hull Kingston Rovers in the 1967–68 Yorkshire Cup Final during the 1967–68 season at Headingley, Leeds on Saturday 14 October 1967.

=== International honours ===
Keegan won caps for England while at Hull in 1969 against Wales, and France, and won caps for Great Britain while at Hull in 1966 against Australia (2 matches), in 1967 against France (2 matches), and Australia (3 matches), in 1968 against France, and in 1969 against France.

== Coaching career ==
Keegan was the coach in Bramley's 15–7 victory over Widnes in the 1973 BBC2 Floodlit Trophy Final during the 1973–74 season at Naughton Park, Widnes on Tuesday 18 December 1973.

== Personal life ==
Keegan had three children from his first marriage to Anne (née Bottomley); Lucy, Bridget and Amelia, and two children from his second marriage to Jackie; twins Thomas and Rhys.
