= Eric Ashton =

England rugby league footballer (1935–2008)

Eric Ashton MBE

Personal information
- Born: 24 January 1935 St. Helens, England
- Died: 20 March 2008 (aged 73) St. Helens, England

Playing information
- Position: Centre
Club
| Years | Team | Pld | T | G | FG | P |
|---|---|---|---|---|---|---|
| 1955–68 | Wigan | 497 | 231 | 448 | 0 | 1589 |
Representative
| Years | Team | Pld | T | G | FG | P |
| 1954–61 | Lancashire | 11 | 8 | 3 | 0 | 30 |
| 1957 | Rest of World | 1 | 1 | 0 | 0 | 3 |
| 1957 | GB & France | 1 | 5 | 5 | 0 | 25 |
| 1957–63 | Great Britain | 26 | 14 | 1 | 0 | 44 |
| 1962 | England | 1 | 1 | 0 | 0 | 3 |

Coaching information
Club
| Years | Team | Gms | W | D | L | W% |
| 1963–73 | Wigan |
| 1973–74 | Leeds |
| 1974–80 | St. Helens |
| | Total | 0 | 0 | 0 | 0 |
Representative
| Years | Team | Gms | W | D | L | W% |
| 1979–80 | England | 2 | 2 | 0 | 0 | 100 |
| 1979 | Great Britain | 6 | 2 | 0 | 4 | 33 |

Eric Ashton (24 January 1935 – 20 March 2008) was an English World Cup winning professional rugby league footballer who played in the 1950s and 1960s, and coached in the 1960s, 1970s and 1980s.

He played his whole top flight football career for Wigan along with at times both captaining and coaching them; his position of choice was at centre. Over the span of his career he came to be known as one of the best centres in the modern game and formed a devastating partnership with Billy Boston somewhat because of this combination he went on to represent the Great Britain national side making his début in 1957. After his retirement from playing rugby league in 1969, Ashton went on to coach Wigan as well as Leeds, St. Helens, England and Great Britain; he also had a brief stint as chairman of St Helens in 1996. He was a member of the St Helens board for fifteen years.

== Background ==
Ashton was born and brought up in St Helens, Lancashire, England.

He began playing rugby league at an early age and it was not long before his talent became noticeable; he was signed to the St. Helens schoolboys side before joining the army not long after.

== Playing career ==
=== 1950s ===
In 1954, Ashton was spotted playing rugby union during his national service in the Royal Artillery and was subsequently invited for a trial with Wigan. He attended the trial and was seen by the directors of the club as being a player with exceptional talent, after Wigan offered him a spot in their top-level side he offered his home town club St. Helens the chance to sign him but they passed and he then signed for Wigan in 1955 for £150. He made his first representative later that year, appearing for Lancashire against New Zealand. He represented Rest of the World in the 11–20 defeat by Australia at Sydney Cricket Ground on 29 June 1957, and represented Great Britain & France in the 37–31 victory over New Zealand at Carlaw Park, Auckland on 3 July 1957. After signing for Wigan he quickly linked up with Welsh winger Billy Boston, and formed one of the most devastating right-hand side threequarters partnerships of modern times. Ashton played at centre in the 8–13 defeat by Oldham in the 1956–57 Lancashire Cup Final during the 1957–58 season at Station Road, Swinton on Saturday 19 October 1957. He played centre and was captain in the 13–9 victory over Workington Town in the 1957–58 Challenge Cup Final during the 1957–58 season at Wembley Stadium, London on Saturday 10 May 1958, in front of a crowd of 66,109, such was the impact of both Ashton and Boston it led to Ashton being promoted as captain of the Wigan side after just two years at the club at the age of 22. It was a position he would go on to hold for the next twelve years. He made his international début at the age of 22 for the Great Britain side against France in 1957. He would go on to collect a total of 26 caps for the Great Britain side with his first Southern Hemisphere tour coming in 1957 as the British side competed in the World Cup. He was a true professional in every sense, being sent off just twice in his whole career and due to his professionalism, talent and intelligence he would go on to achieve a long and distinguished footballing career. Ashton's honours and achievements are nothing short of impressive, with 3 victorious Wembley Stadium Challenge Cup finals (out of a possible six), a Championship in 1960, a Lancashire Challenge Cup and two Lancashire League Championships as well as a BBC Floodlit trophy. He played centre, and was captain in Wigan's 30–13 victory over Hull F.C. in the 1958–59 Challenge Cup Final during the 1958–59 season at Wembley Stadium, London on Saturday 9 May 1959, in front of a crowd of 79,811.

=== 1960s ===
Ashton would become somewhat immortalised as one of the players involved in the all-conquering British side of 1960, captaining Great Britain to victory over the Australians on several occasions. It's usually said that Ashton's greatest moment could have come in the 1962 tour to Australasia when while captaining Great Britain to an almost complete whitewash over the Australians, a last minute refereeing decision ruined the chance of this occurring. In total Ashton captained Great Britain 15 times. He was coach and captain, played at centre and scored a conversion in the 20–16 victory over Hunslet in the 1964–65 Challenge Cup Final during the 1964–65 season at Wembley Stadium, London on Saturday 8 May 1965, in front of a crowd of 89,016. Due to his heroics in the Southern Hemisphere, Eric Ashton was the first rugby league player to be honoured by the Queen. He was awarded the MBE in June 1966. Eric Ashton played at centre, and scored a try in Wigan's 16–13 victory over Oldham in the 1966–67 Lancashire Cup Final during the 1966–67 season at Station Road, Swinton, on Saturday 29 October 1966. Eric Ashton played centre, and was the coach in Wigan's 7–4 victory over St. Helens in the 1968 BBC2 Floodlit Trophy Final during the 1968–69 season at Central Park, Wigan on Tuesday 17 December 1968. Eric Ashton's Testimonial match was a St. Helens born XIII against a Wigan born XIII (but including the Tiger Bay, Cardiff born Billy Boston) at Central Park, Wigan on Whitsun Monday 26 May 1969.

== Coaching career ==
In 1963 he was appointed player-coach of the Wigan club, a position that he held for a further six years before hanging up his boots as a player in 1969. He would continue on his managerial role at the club for another four years.

Eric Ashton was the coach in Wigan's 6–11 defeat by Leigh in the 1969 BBC2 Floodlit Trophy Final during the 1969–70 season at Central Park, Wigan on Tuesday 16 December 1969.

Following the 1973 season Ashton resigned his post as Wigan coach and moved to Leeds for a short spell before moving on to coach St. Helens from May 1974 to May 1980, including two Challenge Cup finals in 1976 and 1978.

Eric Ashton was the coach in St. Helens' 22–2 victory over Dewsbury in the 1975 BBC2 Floodlit Trophy Final during the 1975–76 season at Knowsley Road, St. Helens on Tuesday 16 December 1975, was the coach in St. Helens' 11–26 defeat by Hull Kingston Rovers in the 1977 BBC2 Floodlit Trophy Final during the 1977–78 season at Craven Park, Hull on Tuesday 13 December 1977, and was the coach in St. Helens' 7–13 defeat by Widnes in the 1978 BBC2 Floodlit Trophy Final during the 1978–79 season at Knowsley Road, St. Helens on Tuesday 12 December 1978.

In 1996 he was appointed chairman of St. Helens, and was at the helm when they won the double that year.

In 2005 Ashton was also inducted into the Rugby League Hall of Fame, and the British Rugby League Hall of Fame. He is also an inductee of the Wigan Hall of Fame. Prior to his death, Ashton was a director at St. Helens for almost fifteen years.

Only two men have played in, and coached Rugby League World Cup winning Great Britain sides, they are; Eric Ashton, and Jim Challinor.

On 20 March 2008 it was announced that Eric had died at the age of 73 after a long battle with cancer.

== Honours ==
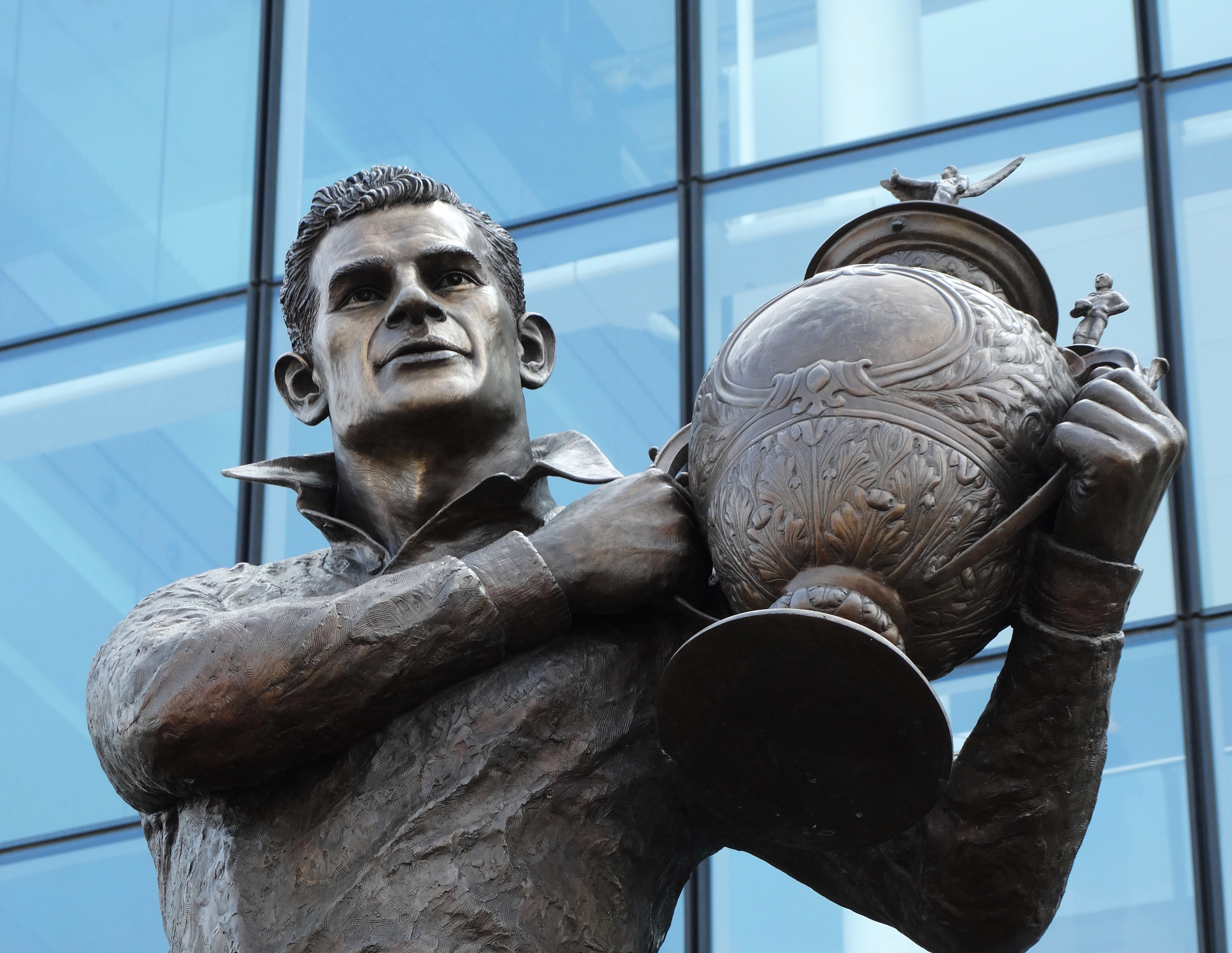
Ashton is one of five rugby league players immortalised with a statue at Wembley Stadium

As a player

- Wigan
  - Championship (1): 1959–60
  - Challenge Cup (3): 1958, 1959, 1965
  - Lancashire League (2): 1958–59, 1961–62
  - Lancashire Cup (1): 1966–67
  - BBC2 Floodlit Trophy (1): 1968
- Great Britain
  - Rugby League World Cup (1): 1960

As a coach

- Wigan
  - League Leaders Trophy (1): 1970–71
  - Lancashire League (1): 1969–70
  - Lancashire Cup (1): 1971–72
- Leeds
  - Yorkshire Cup (1): 1973–74
- St Helens
  - Championship (1): 1974–75
  - Challenge Cup (1): 1976
  - Premiership (2): 1975–76, 1976–77
  - BBC2 Floodlit Trophy (1): 1975
