= Jack Austin (rugby league) =

English RL coach and former rugby league footballer

Personal information
- Born: unknown

Playing information
- Position: Wing
Club
Years	Team	Pld	T	G	FG	P
1965–66	Wakefield Trinity	4	3	0	0	9
1966–70	Castleford	91	31	0	0	93
≤1973–≥73	Bramley
1977–78	Bradford Northern	39	9	0	0	27
	Dewsbury
	Bramley
	Total	134	43	0	0	129

Coaching information
Club
Years	Team	Gms	W	D	L	W%
1988	Hunslet

Jack Austin (birth unknown), also known by the nicknames of "Cowboy", and "Fiery Jack", is a former professional rugby league footballer who played in the 1960s, 1970s and 1980s, and coached in the 1980s. He played at club level for Wakefield Trinity, Castleford, Bramley (two spells), Bradford Northern and Dewsbury, as a wing, and coached at club level for Hunslet.

== Playing career ==
=== BBC2 Floodlit Trophy Final appearances ===
Jack Austin played on the wing and scored a try in Castleford's 7-2 victory over Swinton in the 1966 BBC2 Floodlit Trophy Final during the 1966–67 season at Wheldon Road, Castleford on Tuesday 20 December 1966, and played on the wing, and scored a try in Bramley's 15-7 victory over Widnes in the 1973 BBC2 Floodlit Trophy Final during the 1973–74 season at Naughton Park, Widnes on Tuesday 18 December 1973.
