= Mel James =

Welsh rugby footballer (1948–2022)

Personal information
- Full name: Melvyn James
- Born: 21 February 1948 Resolven, Wales
- Died: 11 December 2022 (aged 74) Resolven, Wales

Playing information

Rugby union
Club
Years	Team	Pld	T	G	FG	P
19??–68	Resolven RFC
1968–72	Swansea RFC	183	17	0	0	57
	Total	183	17	0	0	57

Rugby league
- Position: Prop
Club
Years	Team	Pld	T	G	FG	P
1972–83	St. Helens	337	41	0	0	123
Representative
Years	Team	Pld	T	G	FG	P
1975–81	Wales	11	1	0	0	3

Melvyn James (21 February 1948 – 11 December 2022) was a Welsh rugby union and professional rugby league footballer who played in the 1960s, 1970s and 1980s. He played club level rugby union (RU) for Resolven RFC and Swansea RFC, and at representative level rugby league (RL) for Wales, and at club level for St. Helens, as a prop.

== Career ==
=== International honours ===
Mel James won caps for the Wales (RL) while at St. Helens in the 1975 Rugby League World Cup against England, in 1978 against France, England, and Australia, in 1979 against France and England, in 1980 against France and England, and in 1981 against France and England (2 matches). James also toured with the 1979 Great Britain side in Australia but did not play in any of the test matches.

=== World Club Challenge Final appearances ===
Mel James was a Substitute in St. Helens 2-25 defeat by the 1975 NSWRFL season premiers, Eastern Suburbs Roosters in the unofficial 1976 World Club Challenge at Sydney Cricket Ground on Tuesday 29 June 1976.

=== Challenge Cup Final appearances ===
Mel James played as a substitute (replacing prop John Mantle) in St. Helens' 20-5 victory over Widnes in the 1976 Challenge Cup Final at Wembley Stadium, London on Saturday 8 May 1976.

=== County Cup Final appearances ===
Mel James played left-prop in St. Helens 0-16 defeat by Warrington in the 1982 Lancashire Cup Final at Central Park, Wigan on Saturday 23 October 1982.

=== BBC2 Floodlit Trophy Final appearances ===
Mel James played right-prop in St. Helens' 22-2 victory over Dewsbury in the 1975 BBC2 Floodlit Trophy Final at Knowsley Road, St. Helens on Tuesday 16 December 1975, played right-prop in the 11-26 defeat by Hull Kingston Rovers in the 1977 BBC2 Floodlit Trophy Final at Craven Park, Kingston upon Hull on Tuesday 13 December 1977, and played right-prop in the 7-13 defeat by Widnes in the 1978 BBC2 Floodlit Trophy Final at Knowsley Road, St Helens on Tuesday 12 December 1978.

== Personal life ==
James died on 11 December 2022, at the age of 74.
