= Barley Mow, Bramley =

Rugby league venue in Leeds, England

Coordinates: 53.806°N 1.623°W

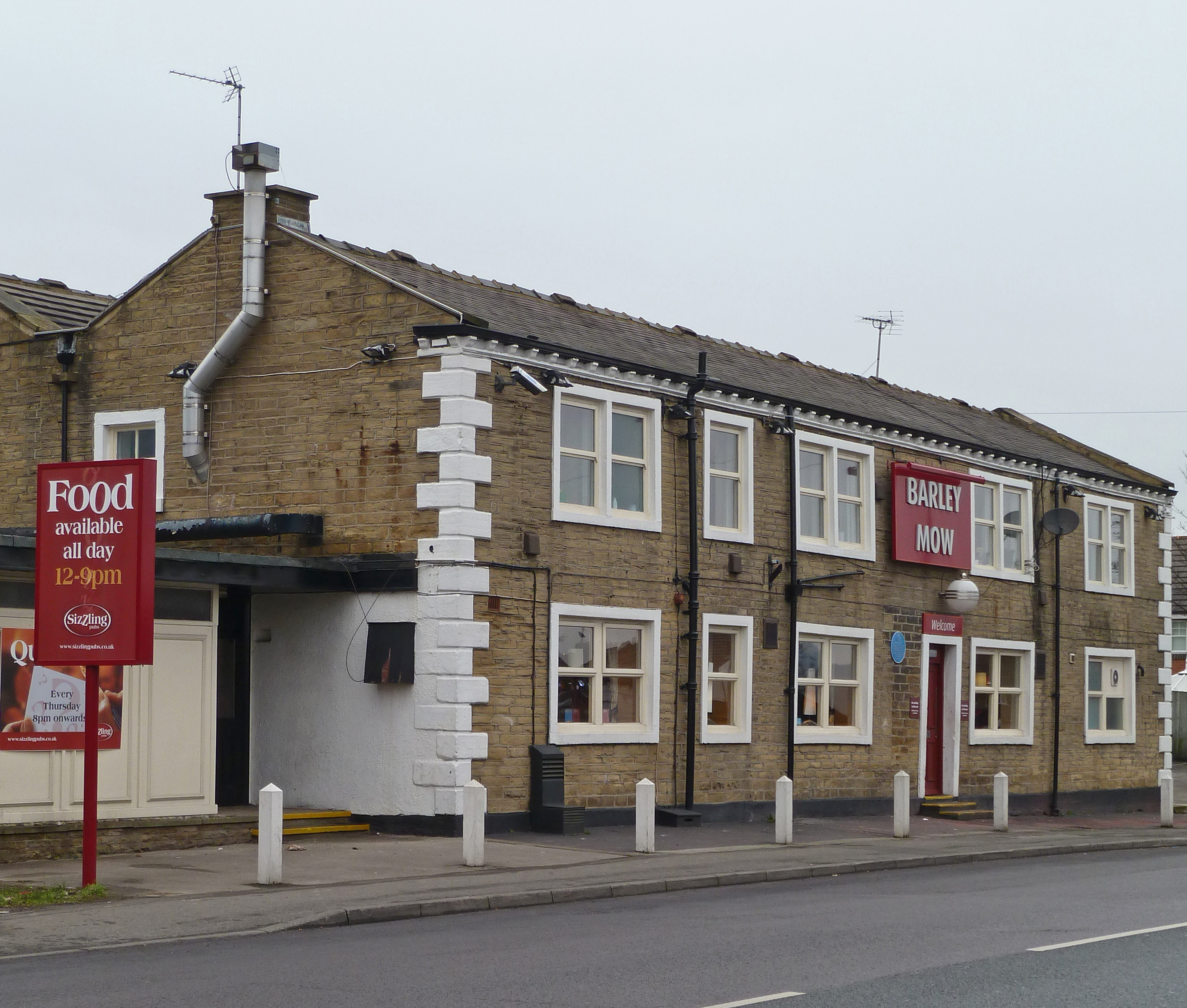
Barley Mow, Lower Town Street, Bramley

Barley Mow was a former home ground of the Bramley rugby league club in Leeds, West Yorkshire, England who moved there in 1881, just two years after their foundation. The club used the nearby Barley Mow public house as changing rooms.

In 1907 Barley Mow became the first ground to stage a club match against the touring New Zealanders. In 2007, a blue plaque was added to the Barley Mow pub to mark the anniversary of the tour match.

In the 1960s, the club moved to a new ground on adjacent land, which became known as McLaren Field. In 1995, the stadium at MacLaren Field had safety problems that Bramley could not afford to implement and it was demolished to be replaced with housing.
