= Rugby League Premiership =

Competition for British rugby league clubs

Premiership
- Sport: Rugby league
- Inaugural season: 1973–74
- Ceased: 1997
- Replaced by: Grand Final
- Country: England
- Last winners: Wigan Warriors (1997)
- Most titles: Widnes (6 titles); Wigan Warriors (6 titles)

The Rugby League Premiership was a competition for British rugby league clubs between 1973 and 1995. As the Super League Premiership the competition continued until 1997.

== History ==
From 1909 until 1973 (except for 1962–64) the Rugby Football League Championship used a play-off format to determine the league champions. For the 1973–74 season the league was split into two divisions, and a play-off system was no longer used.

In order to maintain interest towards the end of the season a new competition, the Club Championship, was introduced to replace the play-offs. The Harry Sunderland Trophy, which had until then been awarded to the man of the match in the championship final, was instead awarded in the premiership final.

The first season saw 16 teams take part: the top 12 of the first division and the top four from the second division. The following season saw the title change to "Premiership", and the format was altered so that only the top eight teams in the first division would compete. A similar competition was later instituted for clubs in the lower league(s). The Premiership continued to be played until 1995–96, and the switch to a summer sport, when the competition was abandoned to allow the 1996 Super League season to begin in the spring.

A top-four play-off leading to a final, the Super League Premiership, was instituted as part of the Super League competition. In 1998 this was replaced by a return to a play-off for the championships, with the Harry Sunderland Trophy being the award to the Grand Final's man of the match.

== Premiership winners ==
For completeness, this table includes the 1973–74 Club Championship, and premiership winners from the Super League era.

| Season | Competition | Winners | Score | Runners-up | Venue |
Rugby Football League Championship First Division era
| 1973–74 | 1973–74 Club Championship | Warrington | 13–12 | St. Helens | Central Park, Wigan |
| 1974–75 | 1974–75 Premiership | Leeds | 26–11 | St. Helens | Central Park, Wigan |
| 1975–76 | 1975–76 Premiership | St. Helens | 15–2 | Salford | Station Road, Swinton |
| 1976–77 | 1976–77 Premiership | St. Helens | 32–20 | Warrington | Station Road, Swinton |
| 1977–78 | 1977–78 Premiership | Bradford Northern | 17–8 | Widnes | Station Road, Swinton |
| 1978–79 | 1978–79 Premiership | Leeds | 24–2 | Bradford Northern | Fartown, Huddersfield |
| 1979–80 | 1979–80 Premiership | Widnes | 19–5 | Bradford Northern | Station Road, Swinton |
| 1980–81 | 1980–81 Premiership | Hull Kingston Rovers | 11–7 | Hull F.C. | Headingley, Leeds |
| 1981–82 | 1981–82 Premiership | Widnes | 23–8 | Hull F.C. | Headingley, Leeds |
| 1982–83 | 1982–83 Premiership | Widnes | 22–10 | Hull F.C. | Headingley, Leeds |
| 1983–84 | 1983–84 Premiership | Hull Kingston Rovers | 18–10 | Castleford | Headingley, Leeds |
| 1984–85 | 1984–85 Premiership | St. Helens | 36–16 | Hull Kingston Rovers | Elland Road, Leeds |
| 1985–86 | 1985–86 Premiership | Warrington | 38–10 | Halifax | Elland Road, Leeds |
| 1986–87 | 1986–87 Premiership | Wigan | 8–0 | Warrington | Old Trafford, Manchester |
| 1987–88 | 1987–88 Premiership | Widnes | 38–14 | St. Helens | Old Trafford, Manchester |
| 1988–89 | 1988–89 Premiership | Widnes | 18–10 | Hull F.C. | Old Trafford, Manchester |
| 1989–90 | 1989–90 Premiership | Widnes | 28–6 | Bradford Northern | Old Trafford, Manchester |
| 1990–91 | 1990–91 Premiership | Hull F.C. | 14–4 | Widnes | Old Trafford, Manchester |
| 1991–92 | 1991–92 Premiership | Wigan | 48–16 | St. Helens | Old Trafford, Manchester |
| 1992–93 | 1992–93 Premiership | St. Helens | 10–4 | Wigan | Old Trafford, Manchester |
| 1993–94 | 1993–94 Premiership | Wigan | 24–20 | Castleford | Old Trafford, Manchester |
| 1994–95 | 1994–95 Premiership | Wigan | 69–12 | Leeds | Old Trafford, Manchester |
Super League era
| 1996 | 1996 Premiership | Wigan | 44–14 | St. Helens | Old Trafford, Manchester |
| 1997 | 1997 Premiership | Wigan | 32–20 | St. Helens | Old Trafford, Manchester |

== See also ==
- Super League Grand Final
