= Bramley R.L.F.C. =

Defunct English rugby league club

Bramley

Club information
- Full name: Bramley Rugby League Football Club
- Nickname: Villagers
- Founded: 1879; 147 years ago
- Exited: 2000; 26 years ago

Former details
- Grounds: Hough Lane (1879-1881); Barley Mow (1881–1965); McLaren Field (1965–1995); Clarence Field (1995–1996); Headingley (1997–1999)
- Competition: Rugby League Championships

Uniforms
Home colours

Records
- BBC2 Floodlit Trophy: 1 (1973–74)

Bramley RLFC was a rugby league club from the Bramley area of Leeds in West Yorkshire, England, that folded following the 1999 season. The club is a famous name in rugby league, having existed before the formation of the Northern Union in 1895. The traditional nickname for the club was 'the Villagers'.

Following Bramley's demise, a Phoenix club was formed by the fans of the original club with the desire to return to the professional ranks, continuing the Bramley name, traditions and history. However, the RFL denied the new clubs' applications twice. The new club was admitted to National League Three in 2004.

== History ==
=== Early history ===
Bramley was founded in 1879. They played at Whitegate Farm and Pollard Lane from their founding and moved to the Barley Mow ground in 1890.

The city of Leeds had an abundance of rugby football clubs and although these were members of the Yorkshire RFU (which was in turn a Constituent Body of the RFU), it was decided to form a ‘more local’ association. For this reason, a Leeds & District organisation was formalised in a meeting at the Green Dragon Hotel, Leeds on 27 September 1888. The foundation clubs were Bramley, Holbeck, Hunslet, Kirkstall, Leeds Parish Church, Leeds St John's (later to become Leeds) and Wortley.

Bramley's England international Harry Bradshaw, was the first test case at Twickenham, over "broken time payments" in 1893, two years before the "great schism" of 1895 that resulted in the formation of the Northern Union, which in time would be renamed as the Rugby League. Bramley was admitted to the new Northern Union on 2 June 1896. The rugby league was then split into two county leagues, Lancashire and Yorkshire.

James Lomas became rugby league's first £100 transfer from Bramley to Salford in 1901.

On 9 October 1907, they became the first club to entertain a touring side when they played the New Zealand All Golds.

On 9 November 1921, the Australian Kangaroos as part of the 1921-22 Kangaroo tour, defeated Bramley 92–7 at Barley Mow. This would remain the highest ever score for an Australian team during a Kangaroo Tour.

In 1942–43, Bramley dropped out of the wartime Yorkshire League. They did not return to league competition until 1945–46.

=== Post-war ===
In the 1960s, the club moved to a new ground on land adjacent to Barley Mow, which became known as McLaren Field. Bramley developed the ground into a more modern stadium in 1966 with the hope that the new ground would help to take them up the leagues.

In 1973, the clubs voted to split into two divisions. Arthur Keegan became first team coach. Bramley defeated Wakefield Trinity, Castleford and St. Helens in order to reach the 1973 BBC2 Floodlit Trophy. They won the trophy with a 15–7 away victory over Widnes on 14 December 1973. It was the first cup Bramley had won in their entire history. Ironically, due to power cuts resulting from the Three-Day Week, the final against Widnes at Naughton Park took place on a mid-week afternoon. The club played in the First Division in that 1973–74 season. Though relegated the club had some excellent league wins including an away victory at Headingley against Leeds. The loss of fixtures against Leeds, Wakefield Trinity and Bradford Northern cost the club financially.

On 1 September 1974, Bramley defeated Doncaster 52–17 at McLaren Field in a Yorkshire County Cup first round tie. This broke the club record which had stood since 1946. However, the resources of the Villagers could not sustain this success, results and attendances flagged, and Keegan was sacked in September 1976.

Bramley won promotion to Division One, under Peter Fox in the 1976–77 season.

Bramley almost went into liquidation in October 1983 but survived.

In 1990, the club was faced with an estimated bill of £250,000 to carry out comprehensive safety work at McLaren Field, for the start of the 1991–92 season. John Kear was appointed coach in 1992.

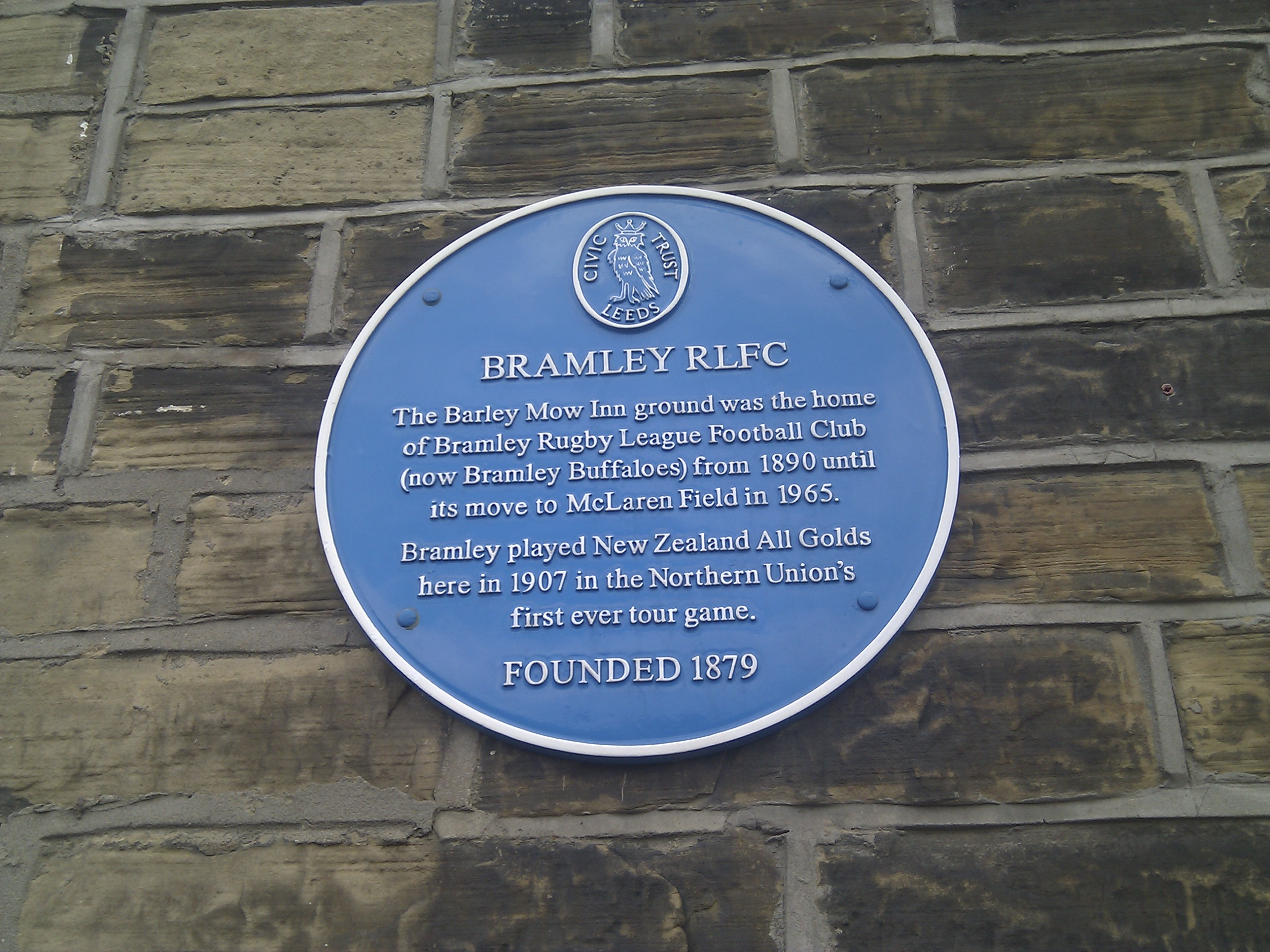
Bramley RLFC Blue Plaque

=== 1994-2000: Financial troubles and demise ===
In January 1994, due to rising debts, Bramley announced plans to leave McLaren Field and ground share with Farsley Celtic. By June the club backtracked and stayed at McLaren Field until the end of the 1994–95 season as Hunslet were considering leaving Elland Road to play at McLaren Field.

Hunslet decided against moving to McClaren Field and moving into the newly opened South Leeds Stadium, closer to Hunslet. For Bramley this meant it would be financially impossible to stay at McClaren Field. The stadium was subsequently sold to developers and the club moved to Clarence Field, Kirkstall, the home of Headingley RUFC.

Leeds Rhinos bought Clarence Field in 1996 to construct a purpose built training facility. This would leave Bramley once again homeless however Leeds would offer Bramley a ground share at Headingley from the 1997 season. Bramley played three seasons at Headingley but once again struggled due to low attendances, and the team became ever more overshadowed by Leeds with some players such as Barrie McDermott and Leroy Rivett turning out for Bramley on the way back from injury.

In 1999, Hunslet had applied to join Super League and proposed a merger with Bramley so they could play home games at Headingley. Hunslet were however unsuccessful in their attempt to join the top tier and Bramley resigned from the Northern Ford Premiership at the end of the 1999 season.

The club applied to rejoin the Northern Ford Premiership in 2000 with the intention of becoming a feeder club for Leeds Rhinos and playing home games at Farsley Celtic's Throstle Nest however they were rejected in favour of a bid from Gateshead Thunder.

After being rejected to join the professional ranks a new supporter owned Phoenix club was set up called Bramley Buffaloes.

== Past coaches ==
Also see Category:Bramley R.L.F.C. coaches.

- Ted Spillane 19??
- David Jenkins 1951-57
- Don Robinson 1964
- Keith Holliday 1966-68
- Arthur Keegan 1973–75
- Don Robinson c. 1975
- Peter Fox 1976–77
- Dave Stockwell 1978 -1979
- Keith Hepworth 1980-82
- Maurice Bamford 1982-83
- Peter Jarvis 1984-85
- Chris Forster 1985
- Allan Agar 1986-87
- Tony Fisher 1988-89
- Barry Johnson 1990
- Roy Dickinson 1991
- John Kear 1992
- Maurice Bamford 1993
- Ray Ashton 1994-96
- Mike Ford 1999

== Former players ==
=== Players earning international caps while at Bramley ===
- Harry Bradshaw won caps for England (RU) while at Bramley in 1892 against Scotland, in 1893 against Wales, Ireland, and Scotland, and in 1894 against Wales, Ireland, and Scotland
- T. Cheshire won a cap(s) for Other Nationalities while at Bramley
- C. Forster won a cap(s) for Other Nationalities while at Bramley
- Louis Marshall won a cap for England while at Bramley in 1923 against Wales
- Rom Pomering won a cap(s) for Other Nationalities while at Bramley
- Terence "Terry Robbins won a cap for Wales while at Bramley in 1963 against France
- W. Bobby Whiteley won a cap for England (RU) while at Bramley in 1896 against Wales

=== Other notable players ===
- Syd Abram captain c. 1934
- Peter Astbury c. 1974
- Mark Aston
- 'Fiery' Jack Austin wing 1973–74 BBC2 Floodlit Trophy
- (Australia) Robert "Bob" Bartlett c. 1948 (to Leeds)
- Leslie Chamberlain
- Geoffrey "Geoff" Clarkson
- Terry Crook
- Paul Drake
- Steve Durham
- Paul Fletcher (Testimonial match 1990)
- Neil Fox
- James "Jim" Hainsworth
- Keith Holliday
- Terry Hollindrake
- Dave Horn prop
- Graham Idle
- Arthur Keegan
- Peter Lister (Testimonial match 1990) try-scoring record 1985-86
- James "Jimmy" Lomas 1899...1901
- Charlie Mathers 1888 British Isles tourist (RU)
- Seamus McCallion
- Barrie McDermott
- Terry Newton
- David Sampson
- Garry Schofield
- Joseph "Joe" Sedgewick
- Stanley "Stan" Smith
- Jeffrey "Jeff" Tennant (Testimonial match 1987)
- Dennis Warrior (Testimonial match 1955)
- John "Johnny" Wilson
- Johnny Wolford
- Wayne (Danny) Thornton

== Seasons ==
=== Summer era ===
Season	League									Play-offs	Challenge Cup	Other competitions	Name	Tries	Name	Points
Season	Division	P	W	D	L	F	A	Pts	Pos	Play-offs	Challenge Cup	Other competitions	Top try scorer		Top point scorer	
1996	Division Two	22	5	0	17	360	759	10	11th		R4					
1997	Division Two	20	5	1	14	353	513	11	9th		R3					
1998	Division Two	20	12	1	7	487	386	25	4th		R3					
1999	Northern Ford Premiership	28	11	1	16	489	596	23	11th		R3					

== Honours ==
- BBC2 Floodlit Trophy
  - Winners (1): 1973–74

== Records ==
=== Player records ===
- Most tries in a match: 7 by Joe Sedgewick vs Normanton, 16 April 1906
- Most tries in a season: 34 by Peter Lister, 1985–86
- Most career tries: 140 by Peter Lister, 1982–91
- Most career goals: 926 by Johnny Wilson, 1953–64
- Most career points: 1903 by Johnny Wilson, 1953–64
- Most career appearances: 410 by Johnny Wolford 1962–76
- Most consecutive appearances: 100 by Jim Hainsworth, April 1960 - December 1962

=== Club records ===
- Highest score against: 92-7 vs Australia, 9 November 1921 (Tour Match)
- Highest attendance at Barley Mow: 12,600 vs Leeds, 7 May 1947
- Highest attendance at McLaren Field: 7,500 vs Bradford Northern, 17 February 1972
