= 1975–76 Northern Rugby Football League season =

1975–76 Rugby Football League season
- League: Northern Rugby Football League
- Champions: Salford
- Runners-up: Featherstone Rovers
- Premiership: St. Helens
- Top point-scorer(s): David Watkins 47
- Top try-scorer(s): Maurice Richards 37

Promotion and relegation
- Promoted from Second Division: Barrow; Rochdale Hornets; Workington Town; Leigh
- Relegated to Second Division: Dewsbury; Keighley; Huddersfield; Swinton

Second Division
- Champions: Barrow

The 1975–76 Rugby Football League season was the 81st season of rugby league football. The Championship was won by Salford and the Challenge Cup winners were St. Helens who beat Widnes 20-5 in the final. The Rugby League Premiership Trophy winners were also St. Helens who beat Salford 15-2 in the final.

== Championship ==
Salford won their sixth, and to date last, Championship. Dewsbury, Keighley, Huddersfield and Swinton were demoted to the Second Division.

| | Team | Pld | W | D | L | PF | PA | Pts |
|---|---|---|---|---|---|---|---|---|
| 1 | Salford | 30 | 22 | 1 | 7 | 555 | 350 | 45 |
| 2 | Featherstone Rovers | 30 | 21 | 2 | 7 | 526 | 348 | 44 |
| 3 | Leeds | 30 | 21 | 0 | 9 | 571 | 395 | 42 |
| 4 | St. Helens | 30 | 19 | 1 | 10 | 513 | 315 | 39 |
| 5 | Wigan | 30 | 18 | 3 | 9 | 514 | 399 | 39 |
| 6 | Widnes | 30 | 18 | 1 | 11 | 448 | 369 | 37 |
| 7 | Wakefield Trinity | 30 | 17 | 0 | 13 | 496 | 410 | 34 |
| 8 | Hull Kingston Rovers | 30 | 17 | 0 | 13 | 446 | 472 | 34 |
| 9 | Castleford | 30 | 16 | 1 | 13 | 589 | 398 | 33 |
| 10 | Warrington | 30 | 15 | 2 | 13 | 381 | 456 | 32 |
| 11 | Bradford Northern | 30 | 13 | 1 | 16 | 454 | 450 | 27 |
| 12 | Oldham | 30 | 11 | 1 | 18 | 380 | 490 | 23 |
| 13 | Dewsbury | 30 | 10 | 1 | 19 | 287 | 484 | 21 |
| 14 | Keighley | 30 | 7 | 0 | 23 | 274 | 468 | 14 |
| 15 | Huddersfield | 30 | 5 | 0 | 25 | 370 | 657 | 10 |
| 16 | Swinton | 30 | 3 | 0 | 27 | 238 | 581 | 6 |

== Second Division Championship ==
2nd Division Champions were Barrow, and they, Rochdale Hornets, Workington Town and Leigh were promoted to the First Division.

| | Team | Pld | W | D | L | PF | PA | Pts |
|---|---|---|---|---|---|---|---|---|
| 1 | Barrow | 26 | 20 | 3 | 3 | 366 | 213 | 43 |
| 2 | Rochdale Hornets | 26 | 19 | 3 | 4 | 347 | 200 | 41 |
| 3 | Workington Town | 26 | 18 | 4 | 4 | 519 | 228 | 40 |
| 4 | Leigh | 26 | 19 | 1 | 6 | 571 | 217 | 39 |
| 5 | Hull | 26 | 19 | 1 | 6 | 577 | 278 | 39 |
| 6 | New Hunslet | 26 | 15 | 1 | 10 | 371 | 308 | 31 |
| 7 | York | 26 | 12 | 1 | 13 | 447 | 394 | 25 |
| 8 | Bramley | 26 | 11 | 1 | 14 | 344 | 370 | 23 |
| 9 | Huyton | 26 | 10 | 0 | 16 | 242 | 373 | 20 |
| 10 | Whitehaven | 26 | 8 | 2 | 16 | 253 | 347 | 18 |
| 11 | Halifax | 26 | 7 | 1 | 18 | 322 | 460 | 15 |
| 12 | Batley | 26 | 6 | 1 | 19 | 228 | 432 | 13 |
| 13 | Blackpool Borough | 26 | 6 | 1 | 19 | 224 | 460 | 13 |
| 14 | Doncaster | 26 | 2 | 0 | 24 | 195 | 726 | 4 |

== Cups ==
=== Challenge Cup ===
In the Challenge Cup final played at Wembley in front of a crowd of 89,982 St. Helens defeated Widnes 20-5. This was St Helens’ fifth Cup Final win in eight Final appearances.

The winner of the Lance Todd Trophy was St. Helens fullback, Geoff Pimblett.

=== Premiership ===
In 1975–76 season the RFL introduced the Premiership Trophy competition. It was played at the end of the season with the top 8 in the league qualifying to play each other in a simple 1st versus 8th, 2nd versus 7th, 3rd versus 6th, and 4th versus 5th system. The final was played on a neutral venue. The competition was played until 1997 when it was scrapped.

This was the second end of season Premiership Play-off Final and was played in front of a crowd of 18,082 at Station Road, Swinton between the number four seeds, St Helens, and the number one seeds, Salford.

St Helens second-row forward, George Nicholls, was the winner of the Harry Sunderland Trophy as Man of the Match.

=== Player's No.6 Trophy ===
The 1975–76 Player's No.6 Trophy Winners were Widnes who beat Hull F.C. 19-13 in the final.

=== County cups ===
Widnes beat Salford 16–7 to win the Lancashire Cup, and Leeds beat Hull Kingston Rovers 15–11 to win the Yorkshire Cup.

=== BBC2 Floodlit Trophy ===
The BBC2 Floodlit Trophy Winners were St. Helens who beat Dewsbury 22-2 in the final.

== Sources ==
- 1975–76 Rugby Football League season at wigan.rlfans.com
- The Challenge Cup at The Rugby Football League website
