= List of testimonial players at Leeds Rhinos =

This is a list of testimonial matches involving Leeds Rhinos players.

== Testimonials ==
Year	Name	score	Opponent
1963	(Wales) Lewis Jones		
1972	(England) Mick Shoebottom		
1974	(England) Ray Batten		
1974	(England) Syd Hynes		
1975	(England) Alan Smith		
1976	(England) John Atkinson		
1980	(England) Les Dyl		
1982	(England) Roy Dickinson		
1982	(England) David Ward		
1987	(England) David "Dave" Heron		
1989	(England) John Holmes		
1992	(England) David Creasser		
2003	(England) Francis Cummins		Huddersfield Giants
2005	(England) Barrie McDermott		Oldham
2007	(England) Keith Senior		Huddersfield Giants
2008	(England) Kevin Sinfield		Oldham
2009	(England) Jamie Jones-Buchanan	16-20	Hull F.C.
2010	(England) Matt Diskin	12-10	Bradford Bulls
2011	(England) Rob Burrow	18-40	Featherstone Rovers
2013	(England) Danny McGuire	24-24	Bradford Bulls
2014	(England) Ryan Bailey	62-10	London Broncos
2015	(England) Jamie Peacock	34-14	Bradford Bulls
2016	(England) Carl Ablett	26-12	Bradford Bulls
2017	(England) Ryan Hall	30-4	Hull Kingston Rovers
2018	(England) Kallum Watkins	24-6	Castleford Tigers
2025	(England) Ash Handley	22-4	Wigan Warriors
