= 1982–83 John Player Trophy =

- Structure: National knockout championship
- Teams: 33
- Winners: Wigan
- Runners-up: Leeds

The 1982–83 John Player Trophy was a British rugby league knockout tournament sponsored by John Player & Sons. It was the 12th season that the competition was held.

Wigan claimed the trophy by beating Leeds by the score of 22-11 in the final played at Elland Road, Leeds, West Yorkshire. The attendance was 19,553 and receipts were £49,027.

== Background ==
This season saw no changes in the entrants, no new members and no withdrawals, the number remaining at thirty-three.
The preliminary round of one match remained

== Competition and results ==
=== Preliminary round ===
Involved 1 matches and 2 Clubs

Game No	Fixture Date	Home team	Score	Away team	Venue	Att	Rec	Notes	Ref
	Sun 21 Nov 1982	Huyton	9-19	Workington Town	Alt Park, Huyton	240			

=== Round 1 - First Round ===
Involved 16 matches and 32 Clubs

Game No	Fixture Date	Home team	Score	Away team	Venue	Att	Rec	Notes	Ref
1	Sat 27 Nov 1982	St. Helens	17-5	Fulham	Knowsley Road	2365			
2	Sun 5 Dec 1982	Blackpool Borough	6-5	Batley	Borough Park	592			
3	Sun 5 Dec 1982	Cardiff City	7-11	Rochdale Hornets	Ninian Park	620			
4	Sun 5 Dec 1982	Carlisle	26-17	Doncaster	Brunton Park	1413			
5	Sun 5 Dec 1982	Castleford	10-16	Wigan	Wheldon Road	5422			
6	Sun 5 Dec 1982	Dewsbury	11-28	Barrow	Crown Flatt	866			
7	Sun 5 Dec 1982	Featherstone Rovers	14-18	Hull F.C.	Post Office Road	4005			
8	Sun 5 Dec 1982	Hull Kingston Rovers	42-3	Whitehaven	Craven Park (1)	5929			
9	Sun 5 Dec 1982	Keighley	0-18	Bradford Northern	Lawkholme Lane	4278			
10	Sun 5 Dec 1982	Leeds	17-7	Bramley	Headingley	4085			
11	Sun 5 Dec 1982	Leigh	13-12	Oldham	Hilton Park	5780			
12	Sun 5 Dec 1982	Salford	23-11	Hunslet	The Willows	1471			
13	Sun 5 Dec 1982	Swinton	13-22	Huddersfield	Station Road	1417			
14	Sun 5 Dec 1982	Warrington	19-8	Halifax	Wilderspool	2892			
15	Sun 5 Dec 1982	Widnes	17-12	Wakefield Trinity	Naughton Park	4075			
16	Sun 5 Dec 1982	York	18-15	Workington Town	Clarence Street	2134			

=== Round 2 - Second Round ===
Involved 8 matches and 16 Clubs

Game No	Fixture Date	Home team	Score	Away team	Venue	Att	Rec	Notes	Ref
1	Sat 11 Dec 1982	Hull Kingston Rovers	36-7	Leigh	Craven Park (1)	5975			
2	Sun 12 Dec 1982	Bradford Northern	12-12	Hull F.C.	Odsal	6222			
3	Sun 12 Dec 1982	Carlisle	2-10	Widnes	Brunton Park	1905			
4	Sun 12 Dec 1982	Leeds	31-10	York	Headingley	3718			
5	Sun 12 Dec 1982	Rochdale Hornets	5-27	Barrow	Athletic Grounds	1295			
6	Sun 12 Dec 1982	Salford	21-19	Huddersfield	The Willows	1924			
7	Sun 12 Dec 1982	Warrington	36-15	Blackpool Borough	Wilderspool	2347			
8	Sun 12 Dec 1982	Wigan	9-5	St. Helens	Central Park	12172			

=== Round 2 - Second Round Replays ===
Involved 1 match and 2 Clubs

Game No	Fixture Date	Home team	Score	Away team	Venue	Att	Rec	Notes	Ref
	Wed 15 Dec 1982	Hull F.C.	8-10	Bradford Northern	Boulevard	7628		1	

=== Round 3 -Quarter Finals ===
Involved 4 matches with 8 clubs

Game No	Fixture Date	Home team	Score	Away team	Venue	Att	Rec	Notes	Ref
1	Sat 18 Dec 1982	Salford	4-5	Wigan	The Willows	3237			
2	Sun 19 Dec 1982	Barrow	8-13	Leeds	Craven Park	4216			
3	Sun 19 Dec 1982	Warrington	11-10	Hull Kingston Rovers	Wilderspool	3943			
4	Sun 19 Dec 1982	Widnes	16-10	Bradford Northern	Naughton Park	4667			

=== Round 4 – Semi-Finals ===
Involved 2 matches and 4 Clubs

Game No	Fixture Date	Home team	Score	Away team	Venue	Att	Rec	Notes	Ref
1	Tue 28 Dec 1982	Leeds	8-2	Widnes	Fartown	7247			
2	Sat 1 Jan 1983	Wigan	15-14	Warrington	Knowsley Road	9017			

=== Final ===
This game was the first time Wigan and Leeds had met in a cup final. The Leeds team was weakened by the absence of several players, with Keith Rayne, Kevin Rayne and Alan Smith all missing out due to injury.

The final was contested at Elland Road, and was won by Wigan through second-half tries scored by Gill and Juliff. Wigan stand-off Martin Foy received the man of the match award.

Game No	Fixture Date	Home team	Score	Away team	Venue	Att	Rec	Notes	Ref
	Saturday 22 January 1983	Wigan	15-4	Leeds	Elland Road	19553	49027		

==== Teams and scorers ====
Wigan	№	Leeds
	Teams	
Barry Williams	1	Neil Hague
Dennis Ramsdale	2	Mark Campbell
David Stephenson	3	Ian Wilkinson
Colin Whitfield	4	Les Dyl
Henderson Gill	5	Andy Smith
Martin Foy	6	John Holmes
Jimmy Fairhurst	7	Kevin Dick
Glyn Shaw	8	Roy Dickinson
Nicky Kiss	9	David Ward
Danny Campbell	10	Tony Burke
Graeme West	11	Andy Sykes
Mick Scott	12	Wayne Heron
John Pendlebury	13	David Heron
Brian Juliff (for Henderson Gill 61 min)	14	Mark Conway (not used)
Brian Case (for Graeme West 50 min)	15	David Heselwood (not used)
Alex Murphy	Coach	Robin Dewhurst
15	score	4
3	HT	4
	Scorers	
	Tries	
Henderson Gill (1)	T	
Brian Juliff (1)	T	
	Goals	
Colin Whitfield (4)	G	Kevin Dick (2)
	Drop Goals	
Colin Whitfield (1)	DG	
Referee		Ron Campbell (Widnes)
Man of the match		Martin Foy - Wigan - stand-off
Competition Sponsor		John Player

Scoring - Try = three points - Goal = two points - Drop goal = one point

==== Timeline in the final ====
Time	Incident	Score
7 min	Drop goal: Colin Whitfield	1-0
?	Penalty Goal: Kevin Dick	1-2
?	Penalty Goal: Kevin Dick	1-4
?	Penalty Goal: Colin Whitfield	3-4
Half Time		3-4
57 min	Try: Henderson Gill	6-4
	Conversion: Colin Whitfield	8-4
64 min	Penalty Goal: Colin Whitfield	10-4
?	Try: Brian Juliff	13-4
	Conversion: Colin Whitfield	15-4
Full Time		15-4

=== Prize money ===
As part of the sponsorship deal and funds, the prize money awarded to the competing teams for this season is as follows:

Finish Position	Cash prize	No. receiving prize	Total cash
Winner	£10,000	1	£10,000
Runner-up	£5,000	1	£5,000
Semi-finalist	£2,500	2	£5,000
Loser in Rd 3	£1,175	4	£4,700
Loser in Rd 2	£900	8	£7,200
Loser in Rd 1	£700	16	£11,200
Loser in Prelim Round	£700	2	£1,400
Total prize money			£44,500
Development fund			£10,500
Grand Total			£55,000

=== The road to success ===
This tree excludes any preliminary round fixtures

First round
Salford	23
Hunslet	11
Swinton	13
Huddersfield	22
Castleford	10
Wigan	16
St. Helens	17
Fulham	2
Warrington	19
Halifax	8
Blackpool Borough	6
Batley	5
Hull Kingston Rovers	42
Whitehaven	3
Leigh	13
Oldham	12
Cardiff City	7
Rochdale Hornets	11
Dewsbury	11
Barrow	28
Leeds	17
Bramley	7
York	18
Workington Town	15
Carlisle	26
Doncaster	17
Widnes	17
Wakefield Trinity	12
Keighley	0
Bradford Northern	18
Featherstone Rovers	14
Hull F.C.	18

Second round
Salford	21
Huddersfield	19
Wigan	9
St. Helens	5
Warrington	36
Blackpool Borough	15
Hull Kingston Rovers	36
Leigh	7
Rochdale Hornets	5
Barrow	27
Leeds	31
York	10
Carlisle	2
Widnes	10
Bradford Northern	12 (10)
Hull F.C.	12 (8)

Third round
Salford	4
Wigan	5
Warrington	11
Hull Kingston Rovers	10
Barrow	8
Leeds	13
Widnes	16
Bradford Northern	11

Semifinals
Wigan	15
Warrington	14
Leeds	8
Widnes	2

Final
Wigan	15
Leeds	4

== See also ==
- 1982–83 Rugby Football League season
- 1982 Lancashire Cup
- 1982 Yorkshire Cup
- Player's No.6 Trophy
- Rugby league county cups
