= John Holmes (rugby league) =

English rugby league footballer (1952–2009)

Personal information
- Born: 21 March 1952 Kirkstall, Leeds, England
- Died: 26 September 2009 (aged 57) Leeds, England

Playing information
- Position: Fullback, Stand-off, Second-row
Club
Years	Team	Pld	T	G	FG	P
1968–90	Leeds	625	153	539	3	1554
Representative
Years	Team	Pld	T	G	FG	P
1971–82	Great Britain	20	3	20	2	51
1975–78	England	7	5	0	0	15
1973–82	Yorkshire	8	1	8	0	19

John Holmes (21 March 1952 – 26 September 2009) was an English professional rugby league footballer.

In a career spanning from 1968 to 1990, Holmes made a club record 625 appearances for Leeds, starting his career as a fullback or centre, and later switching to stand-off. Holmes played in nineteen major finals for Leeds winning all but five. He played at the highest level, representing Yorkshire, England and Great Britain. He made 20 appearances between 1971 and 1982 for Great Britain, and was a World Cup winner for Great Britain in 1972 at the age of twenty.

== Background ==
John Holmes was born in Kirkstall, Leeds, West Riding of Yorkshire, England, and he died aged 57 in Leeds, West Yorkshire, England.

== Playing career ==
=== Leeds ===
Holmes début for Leeds was in a Lazenby Cup match against Hunslet where he scored a try and kicked 10 goals.

In the 1970–71 season, Holmes played fullback in Leeds' 23–7 victory over Featherstone Rovers in the 1970–71 Yorkshire Cup Final at Odsal Stadium, Bradford on Saturday 21 November 1970, played fullback, and scored 2-conversions in Leeds' 9–5 victory over St. Helens in the 1970 BBC2 Floodlit Trophy Final at Headingley, Leeds on Tuesday 15 December 1970, and played in Leeds' 7–24 defeat by Leigh in the 1970–71 Challenge Cup Final at Wembley Stadium, London on Saturday 15 May 1971, in front of a crowd of 85,514,

In the 1971–72 season, Holmes played fullback in the 13–16 defeat by St. Helens in the 1971–72 Challenge Cup Final at Wembley Stadium, London on Saturday 13 May 1972, in front of a crowd of 89,495.

In the 1972–73 season, Holmes played fullback, scored 3-tries, and was man of the match winning the White Rose Trophy in the 36–9 victory over Dewsbury in the 1972–73 Yorkshire Cup Final at Odsal Stadium, Bradford on Saturday 7 October 1972, and played fullback, and scored a conversion in Leeds' 12–7 victory over Salford in the 1972–73 Player's No.6 Trophy Final at Fartown Ground, Huddersfield on Saturday 24 March 1973.

In the 1973–74 season, Holmes played fullback in the 7–2 victory over Wakefield Trinity in the 1973–74 Yorkshire Cup Final at Headingley, Leeds on Saturday 20 October 1973.

In the 1974–75 season, Holmes played in Leeds' 26–11 victory over St. Helens in the 1974–75 Rugby League Premiership Final at Central Park, Wigan on Saturday 17 May 1975.

In the 1975–76 season, Holmes played stand-off, scored 4-conversions and a drop goal in the 15–11 victory over Hull Kingston Rovers in the 1975–76 Yorkshire Cup Final at Headingley, Leeds on Saturday 15 November 1975.

In the 1976–77 season, Holmes played stand-off and captained Leeds in the 16–12 victory over Featherstone Rovers in the 1976–77 Yorkshire Cup Final at Headingley, Leeds on Saturday 16 October 1976, and played stand-off in the 16–7 victory over Widnes in the 1976–77 Challenge Cup Final at Wembley Stadium, London on Saturday 7 May 1977, in front of a crowd of 80,871.

In the 1977–78 season, Holmes played stand-off in the 14–12 victory over St. Helens in the 1977–78 Challenge Cup Final at Wembley Stadium, London on Saturday 13 May 1978, in front of a crowd of 96,000.

In the 1978–79 season, Holmes missed the 24–2 victory over Bradford Northern in the 1978–79 Rugby League Premiership Final at Fartown Ground, Huddersfield on Saturday 27 May 1979 after being called up as a late replacement for the 1979 GB Lions Tour to Australasia.

In the 1979–80 season, Holmes played stand-off (replaced by substitute Christopher Sanderson) in the 15–6 victory over Halifax in the 1979–80 Yorkshire Cup Final at Headingley, Leeds on Saturday 27 October 1979.

In the 1980–81 season, Holmes played stand-off in the 8–7 victory over Hull Kingston Rovers in the 1980–81 Yorkshire Cup Final at Fartown Ground, Huddersfield on Saturday 8 November 1980.

In the 1982–83 season, Holmes played stand-off in the 4–15 defeat by Wigan in the 1982–83 John Player Trophy Final at Elland Road, Leeds on Saturday 22 January 1983,

In the 1983–84 season, Holmes played stand-off, and scored a try in the 18–10 victory over Widnes in the 1983–84 John Player Special Trophy Final at Central Park, Wigan on Saturday 14 January 1984.

In 1985, Holmes announced his retirement, but he returned to Headingley a year later.

John Holmes' testimonial match at Leeds took place in 1989.

=== International honours ===
Holmes won caps for England while at Leeds in the 1975 Rugby League World Cup against Wales, France, New Zealand, and Australia, in 1977 against Wales, and France (sub), in 1978 against France (sub), and won caps for Great Britain while at Leeds in 1971 against New Zealand, in 1972 against France (2 matches), in the 1972 Rugby League World Cup against Australia (sub), New Zealand and Australia, in the 1977 Rugby League World Cup against France, New Zealand, Australia, and Australia (sub), in 1978 against Australia (sub) (3 matches), in 1979 against Australia (2 matches), Australia (sub), and New Zealand (3 matches), and in 1982 against Australia.

== Death and legacy ==
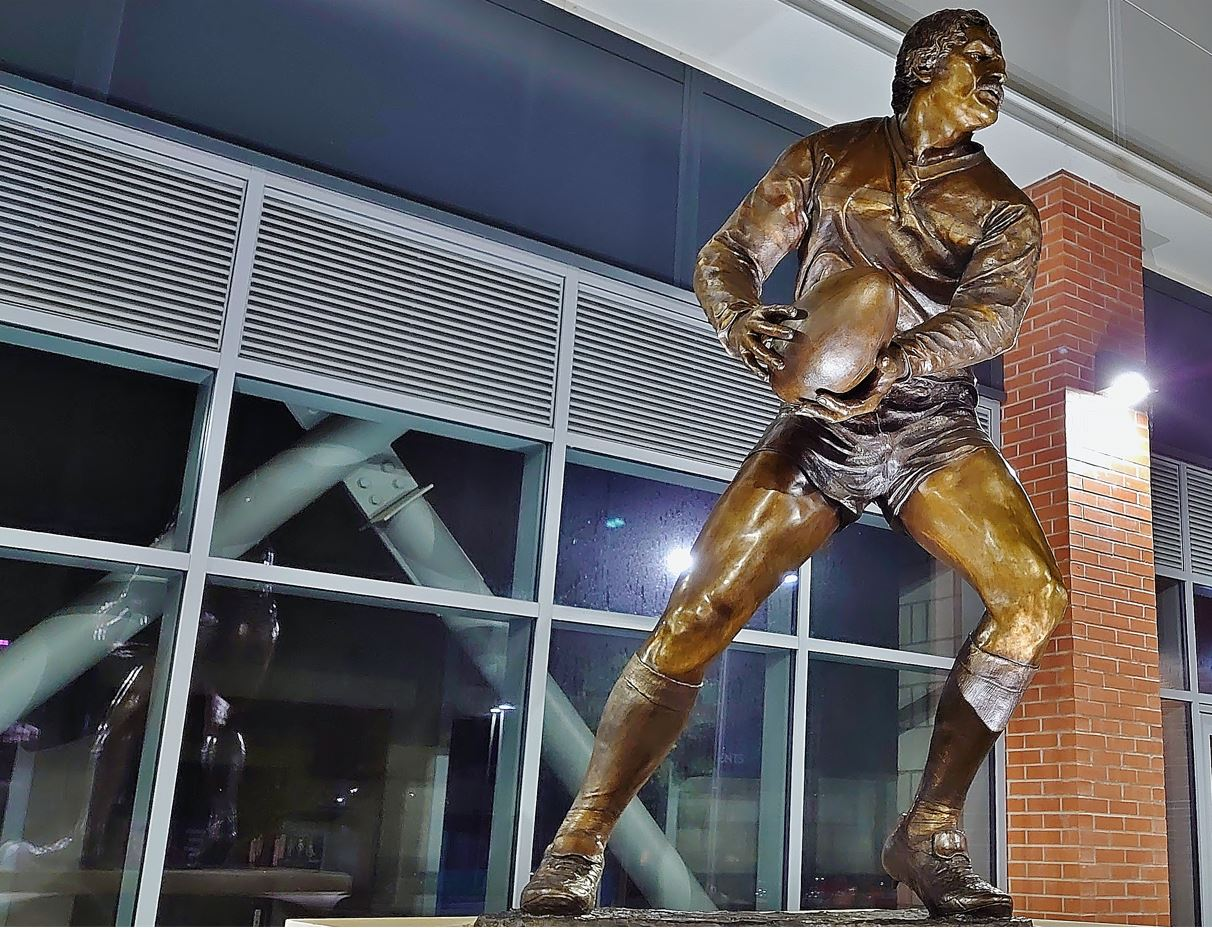
The John Holmes statue at Headingley Rugby League stadium

Holmes died from cancer on 27 September 2009. A minute's silence was observed to mark Holmes' death at the Qualifying Semi-final between Leeds and Catalan Dragons on 4 October 2009. On 10 October, Leeds won the Super League Grand Final, captain Kevin Sinfield dedicated the victory to Holmes.

Holmes was inducted into the Leeds Rugby League Hall of Fame as one of the first round of inductees in 2017.

A statue commemorating Holmes was unveiled outside the South Stand at Headingley Rugby League stadium on 11 July 2021. Many consider Holmes the greatest player Leeds ever had.
