= 1972–73 Player's No.6 Trophy =

- Structure: National knockout championship
- Teams: 32
- Winners: Leeds
- Runners-up: Salford

This was the second season of the League Cup, which was known as the Players No.6 Trophy for sponsorship reasons.

Leeds won the trophy by beating Salford 12–7 in the final. The match was played at Fartown, Huddersfield. The attendance was 10,102 and receipts were £4563.

== Background ==
This season saw no changes in the entrants, no new members and no withdrawals, the number remaining at thirty-two.

== Competition and results ==
=== Round 1 - First Round ===
Involved 16 matches and 32 Clubs

Game No	Fixture Date	Home team	Score	Away team	Venue	Att	Rec	Notes	Ref
1	Fri 22 Sep 1972	Hull Kingston Rovers	20-10	Castleford	Craven Park (1)				
2	Sat 23 Sep 1972	Batley	26-3	Hunslet	Mount Pleasant				
3	Sat 23 Sep 1972	Bramley	26-5	Pilkington Recs	McLaren Field	616		1, 2	
4	Sat 23 Sep 1972	Halifax	20-22	St. Helens	Thrum Hall	2446			
5	Sat 23 Sep 1972	Leigh	10-9	Workington Town	Hilton Park				
6	Sat 23 Sep 1972	Whitehaven	11-16	Featherstone Rovers	Recreation Ground				
7	Sun 24 Sep 1972	Barrow	2-17	Salford	Craven Park				
8	Sun 24 Sep 1972	Blackpool Borough	9-51	Leeds	Borough Park			3	
9	Sun 24 Sep 1972	Bradford Northern	32-6	Rochdale Hornets	Odsal				
10	Sun 24 Sep 1972	Dewsbury	22-4	Dewsbury Celtic	Crown Flatt	1897		4	
11	Sun 24 Sep 1972	Doncaster	7-22	Widnes	Bentley Road Stadium/Tattersfield				
12	Sun 24 Sep 1972	Huddersfield	23-15	Warrington	Fartown				
13	Sun 24 Sep 1972	Hull F.C.	17-10	Oldham	Boulevard				
14	Sun 24 Sep 1972	Swinton	29-10	Huyton	Station Road				
15	Sun 24 Sep 1972	Wigan	10-34	Wakefield Trinity	Central Park			5	
16	Sun 24 Sep 1972	York	21-13	Keighley	Clarence Street				

=== Round 2 - Second Round ===
Involved 8 matches and 16 Clubs

Game No	Fixture Date	Home team	Score	Away team	Venue	Att	Rec	Notes	Ref
1	Fri 24 Nov 1972	Hull F.C.	9-4	Wakefield Trinity	Boulevard				
2	Fri 24 Nov 1972	St. Helens	24-8	Featherstone Rovers	Knowsley Road	4800		6	
3	Fri 24 Nov 1972	Salford	19-3	Dewsbury	The Willows				
4	Sat 25 Nov 1972	Leeds	21-3	Leigh	Headingley				
5	Sun 26 Nov 1972	Bradford Northern	35-17	York	Odsal				
6	Sun 26 Nov 1972	Hull Kingston Rovers	25-5	Bramley	Craven Park (1)				
7	Sun 26 Nov 1972	Swinton	19-11	Huddersfield	Station Road				
8	Sun 26 Nov 1972	Widnes	21-8	Batley	Naughton Park				

=== Round 3 -Quarter Finals ===
Involved 4 matches with 8 clubs

Game No	Fixture Date	Home team	Score	Away team	Venue	Att	Rec	Notes	Ref
1	Fri 8 Dec 1972	Hull Kingston Rovers	A	Swinton	Craven Park (1)			7	
2	Sat 9 Dec 1972	St. Helens	10-3	Widnes	Knowsley Road				
3	Sun 10 Dec 1972	Hull F.C.	18-18	Leeds	Boulevard			8	
4	Sun 10 Dec 1972	Salford	39-2	Bradford Northern	The Willows			9	

=== Round 3 -Quarter Finals - Replays ===
Involved 2 matches with 4 clubs

Game No	Fixture Date	Home team	Score	Away team	Venue	Att	Rec	Notes	Ref
1	Wed 13 Dec 1972	Hull Kingston Rovers	30-6	Swinton	Craven Park (1)				
2	Tue 12 Dec 1972	Leeds	37-5	Hull F.C.	Headingley				

=== Round 4 – Semi-Finals ===
Involved 2 matches and 4 Clubs

Game No	Fixture Date	Home team	Score	Away team	Venue	Att	Rec	Notes	Ref
1	Sat 30 Dec 1972	Hull Kingston Rovers	13-15	Salford	Craven Park (1)				
2	Sat 13 Jan 1973	Leeds	19-0	St. Helens	Headingley	5854			

=== Final ===
Game No	Fixture Date	Home team	Score	Away team	Venue	Att	Rec	Notes	Ref
	Saturday 24 March 1973	Leeds	12-7	Salford	Fartown	10102	4563	10	

==== Teams and scorers ====
Leeds	№	Salford
	teams	
John Holmes	1	Paul Charlton
Alan Smith	2	Anthony "Tony" Colloby
Syd Hynes	3	David Watkins
Les Dyl	4	Chris Hesketh
John Atkinson	5	Maurice Richards
Alan Hardisty	6	Ken Gill
Keith Hepworth	7	Peter Banner
Terry Clawson	8	John Ward
Tony Fisher	9	Terry Ramshaw
David Jeanes	10	Graham Mackay
Bob Haigh	11	Alan Grice
Phil Cookson	12	William Kirkbride
Graham Eccles	13	Colin Dixon
David Ward (for Terry Clawson)	14	xPhil Ward (for Ken Gill)
xFred Pickup (for Tony Fisher)	15	Doug Davies (for Alan Grice)
	Coach	
12	score	7
10	HT	5
	Scorers	
	Tries	
John Atkinson (2)	T	Colin Dixon (1)
	Goals	
John Holmes (1)	G	David Watkins (2)
Terry Clawson (2)	G	
Referee		William "Billy" H. Thompson (Huddersfield)
Man of the match		Keith Hepworth - Leeds - scrum-half
Competition Sponsor		Player's №6

Scoring - Try = three points - Goal = two points - Drop goal = one point

=== Prize money ===
As part of the sponsorship deal and funds, the prize money awarded to the competing teams for this season was as follows:

Finish Position	Cash prize	No. receiving prize	Total cash
Winner	£5,000	1	£5,000
Runner-up	£2,500	1	£2,500
Semi-finalist	£1,000	2	£2,000
Loser in Rd 3	£450	4	£1,800
Loser in Rd 2	£300	8	£2,400
Loser in Rd 1	£150	16	£2,400
Grand Total			£16,100

=== The road to success ===
First round
Hull F.C.	17
Oldham	10
Wigan	10
Wakefield Trinity	34
Blackpool Borough	9
Leeds	51
Leigh	10
Workington Town	9
Halifax	20
St. Helens	22
Whitehaven	11
Featherstone Rovers	16
Doncaster	7
Widnes	22
Batley	26
Hunslet	3
Hull Kingston Rovers	20
Castleford	10
Bramley	26
Pilkington Recs	5
Swinton	29
Huyton	10
Huddersfield	23
Warrington	15
Barrow	2
Salford	17
Dewsbury	22
Dewsbury Celtic	4
Bradford Northern	32
Rochdale Hornets	6
York	21
Keighley	13

Second round
Hull F.C.	9
Wakefield Trinity	4
Leeds	21
Leigh	3
St. Helens	24
Featherstone Rovers	8
Widnes	21
Batley	8
Hull Kingston Rovers	25
Bramley	5
Swinton	19
Huddersfield	11
Salford	19
Dewsbury	3
Bradford Northern	35
York	17

Third round
Hull F.C.	18 (5)
Leeds	18 (37)
St. Helens	10
Widnes	3
Hull Kingston Rovers	30
Swinton	6
Salford	39
Bradford Northern	2

Semifinals
Leeds	19
St. Helens	0
Hull Kingston Rovers	13
Salford	15

Final
Leeds	12
Salford	7

== Notes and comments ==
1 * Pilkington Recs are a Junior (amateur) club from St Helens, home ground was City Road until they moved to Ruskin Drive from 2011 to 2012
2 * Rothmans Rugby League Yearbook 1990–1991, Rothmans Rugby League Yearbook 1991–1992, and RUGBYLEAGUEproject give the score as 26–5 but News of the World Football Annual 1973–74 gives the score as 28–5
3 * highest score to date
4 * Dewsbury Celtic are a Junior (amateur) club from Dewsbury, home ground is Crow Nest Park
5 * RUGBYLEAGUEproject gives score as 10–28 but the Wigan official archives and 100 Years of Rugby. The History of Wakefield Trinity 1873–1973 and Wakefield until I die all give the score as 10–34
6 * News of the World Football Annual 1973–74 gives score as 24–3 but both RUGBYLEAGUEproject and Wigan official archives give it as 24–8
7 * Abandoned after 22 Minutes due to Fog with the score at 4–2 - Result declared void
8 * NO mention on Hull official website of any replay
9 * News of the World Football Annual 1973–74 gives the score as 30–2 but both RUGBYLEAGUEproject and Wigan official archives give it as 39–2
10 * Fartown was the home ground of Huddersfield from 1878 to the end of the 1991–92 season to Huddersfield Town FC's Leeds Road stadium, and then to the McAlpine Stadium in 1994. Fartown remained as a sports/Rugby League ground but is now rather dilapidated, and is only used for staging amateur rugby league games.
Due to lack of maintenance, terrace closures and finally major storm damage closing one of the stands in 1986, the final ground capacity had been reduced to just a few thousands although the record attendance was set in a Challenge cup semi-final on 19 April 1947 when a crowd of 35,136 saw Leeds beat Wakefield Trinity 21–0.

== See also ==
- 1972–73 Northern Rugby Football League season
- 1972 Lancashire Cup
- 1972 Yorkshire Cup
- Player's No.6 Trophy
- Rugby league county cups
