= Ken Kellett =

English rugby league footballer

Personal information
- Full name: Kenneth Kellett
- Born: c. 1954
- Died: 1995 (aged 41)

Playing information
- Height: 5 ft 8 in (1.73 m)
- Weight: 11 st 7 lb (73 kg)
- Position: Wing
Club
Years	Team	Pld	T	G	FG	P
1970–83	Featherstone Rovers	358	124	0	0	372

Kenneth Kellett (c. 1954 – 1995) was an English professional rugby league footballer who played in the 1970s and 1980s. He played at club level for Featherstone Rovers, as a wing.

== Playing career ==
Kellett was signed from amateur club Fryston, and made his début for Featherstone Rovers on Tuesday 29 September 1970.

During the 1972–73 season, Kellett played left wing in Featherstone Rovers' 33–14 victory over Bradford Northern in the 1973 Challenge Cup Final at Wembley Stadium, London on Saturday 12 May 1973, in front of a crowd of 72,395,

Kellett played in Featherstone Rovers' victory in League Championship during the 1976–77 season. He also played left wing in Featherstone Rovers' 12–16 defeat by Leeds in the 1976 Yorkshire Cup Final at Headingley, Leeds on Saturday 16 October 1976.

During the 1977–78 season, Kellett played left wing in the 7–17 defeat by Castleford in the 1977 Yorkshire Cup Final at Headingley, Leeds on Saturday 15 October 1977.

Kellett's benefit season at Featherstone Rovers took place during the 1980–81 season.

Kellett's final appearance of his career was in the 14–12 victory over Hull F.C. in the 1983 Challenge Cup Final during the 1982–83 season at Wembley Stadium, London on Saturday 7 May 1983, in front of a crowd of 84,969.

== Death ==
Kellett died in March 1995 after suffering a stroke, aged 41.
