= 1980–81 Yorkshire Cup =

Occurrence of the Yorkshire Cup competition in the early 80s

- Structure: Regional knockout championship
- Teams: 16
- Winners: Leeds
- Runners-up: Hull Kingston Rovers

The 1980–81 Yorkshire Cup was the seventy-third occasion on which the Yorkshire Cup competition had been held.

Leeds winning the trophy by beating Hull Kingston Rovers by the score of 8–7.

The match was played at Fartown Ground, Huddersfield, now in West Yorkshire. The attendance was 9,751 and receipts were £15,578.

This was Leeds' eighth victory (and the second of two consecutive victories - for the third time within the sequence) in what has been eight times in the space of thirteen seasons.

== Background ==
This season there were no junior/amateur clubs taking part, no new entrants and no "leavers" and so the total of entries remained the same at sixteen.

This in turn resulted in no byes in the first round.

== Competition and results ==
=== Round 1 ===
Involved 8 matches (with no byes) and 16 clubs

Game No	Fixture Date	Home team	Score	Away team	Venue	Att	Rec	Notes	Ref
1	Sat 16 Aug 1980	Leeds	47–8	York	Headingley	2921			
2	Sun 17 Aug 1980	Bradford Northern	10–6	Batley	Odsal	3173			
3	Sun 17 Aug 1980	Dewsbury	5–15	Bramley	Crown Flatt	1100			
4	Sun 17 Aug 1980	Featherstone Rovers	16–12	Hull F.C.	Post Office Road	7025			
5	Sun 17 Aug 1980	Halifax	8–18	Castleford	Thrum Hall	2926			
6	Sun 17 Aug 1980	Hull Kingston Rovers	21–17	Wakefield Trinity	Craven Park (1)	7628			
7	Sun 17 Aug 1980	Hunslet	22–4	Doncaster	Mount Pleasant	550			
8	Sun 17 Aug 1980	Keighley	16–25	Huddersfield	Lawkholme Lane	1550			

=== Round 2 - Quarter-finals ===
Involved 4 matches and 8 clubs

Game No	Fixture Date	Home team	Score	Away team	Venue	Att	Rec	Notes	Ref
1	Sun 24 Aug 1980	Castleford	26–25	Bramley	Wheldon Road	2215			
2	Sun 24 Aug 1980	Huddersfield	20–13	Bradford Northern	Fartown	4080			
3	Sun 24 Aug 1980	Hull Kingston Rovers	33–12	Featherstone Rovers	Craven Park (1)	9088			
4	Sun 24 Aug 1980	Leeds	31–12	Hunslet	Headingley	3940			

=== Round 3 – Semi-finals ===
Involved 2 matches and 4 clubs

Game No	Fixture Date	Home team	Score	Away team	Venue	Att	Rec	Notes	Ref
1	Wed 10 Sep 1980	Castleford	7–11	Hull Kingston Rovers	Wheldon Road	7328			
2	Thu 11 Sep 1980	Leeds	17–13	Huddersfield	Headingley	4418			

=== Final ===
Game No	Fixture Date	Home team	Score	Away team	Venue	Att	Rec	Notes	Ref
	Saturday 8 November 1980	Leeds	8–7	Hull Kingston Rovers	Fartown	9,751	£15,578	(Note: Fartown was the home ground of Huddersfield from 1878 to the end of the 1991-92 season to Huddersfield Town FC's Leeds Road stadium, and then to the McAlpine Stadium in 1994. Fartown remained as a sports/Rugby League ground but is now rather dilapidated, and is only used for staging amateur rugby league games.)	

==== Teams and scorers ====
Leeds	№	Hull Kingston Rovers
	teams	
Willie Oulton	1	Ian Robinson
Alan Smith	2	Gary McHugh
David Smith	3	Mike Smith
Neil Hague	4	Phil Hogan
John Atkinson	5	Wally Youngman
John Holmes	6	Dave Hall
Kevin Dick	7	Paul Harkin
Mick Harrison	8	Roy Holdstock
David Ward (c)	9	xRaymond Price
Steve Pitchford	10	Steve Crooks
Graham Eccles	11	Phil Lowe
Phil Cookson	12	Len Casey (c)
David Heron	13	Mick Crane
John Sanderson	14	Ged Dunn
John Carroll (for Phil Cookson)	15	Paul Rose (for Steve Crooks)
Robin Dewhurst	Coach	Roger Millward
8	score	7
2	HT	7
	Scorers	
	Tries	
Alan Smith (1)	T	Gary McHugh (1)
	Goals	
Kevin Dick (2)	G	Phil Hogan (2)
	Drop Goals	
Kevin Dick (1)	DG	
Referee		Ron Campbell (Widnes)
White Rose Trophy for Man of the match		Kevin Dick - Leeds - scrum-half
sponsored by		
Competition Sponsor		Webster's Brewery (Samuel Webster & Sons Ltd)

Scoring - Try = three points - Goal = two points - Drop goal = one point

=== The road to success ===
First round
Leeds	47
York	8
Hunslet	22
Doncaster	4
Keighley	16
Huddersfield	25
Bradford Northern	10
Batley	6
Halifax	8
Castleford	18
Dewsbury	5
Bramley	15
Hull Kingston Rovers	21
Wakefield Trinity	17
Featherstone Rovers	16
Hull F.C.	12

Second round
Leeds	31
Hunslet	12
Huddersfield	20
Bradford Northern	13
Castleford	26
Bramley	25
Hull Kingston Rovers	33
Featherstone Rovers	12

Semi-finals
Leeds	17
Huddersfield	13
Castleford	7
Hull Kingston Rovers	11

Final
Leeds	8
Hull Kingston Rovers	7

== See also ==
- 1980–81 Rugby Football League season
- Rugby league county cups
