= 1976–77 Yorkshire Cup =

- Structure: Regional knockout championship
- Teams: 16
- Winners: Leeds
- Runners-up: Featherstone Rovers

The 1976–77 Yorkshire Cup was the sixty-ninth occasion on which the Yorkshire Cup competition had been held.

Leeds won the trophy by beating Featherstone Rovers by the score of 16–12.

The match was played at Headingley, Leeds, now in West Yorkshire. The attendance was 7,645 and receipts were £5,198.

This was Leeds' sixth victory (and the second of two consecutive victories) in what would be eight times in the space of thirteen seasons.

It as also Featherstone Rovers's first of two consecutive Yorkshire Cup final appearances, both of which resulted in a defeat.

== Background ==
This season there were no junior/amateur clubs taking part, no new entrants and no "leavers" and so the total of entries remained the same at sixteen.

This in turn resulted in no byes in the first round.

== Competition and results ==
=== Round 1 ===
Involved 8 matches (with no byes) and 16 clubs

| Game No | Fixture date | Home team | Score | Away team | Venue | Att | Rec | Notes | Ref |
|---|---|---|---|---|---|---|---|---|---|
| 1 | Sun 22 Aug 1976 | Batley | 11–27 | Keighley | Mount Pleasant | | | | |
| 2 | Sun 22 Aug 1976 | Bradford Northern | 9–11 | Leeds | Odsal | | | | |
| 3 | Sun 22 Aug 1976 | Bramley | 7–15 | Wakefield Trinity | McLaren Field | | | | |
| 4 | Sun 22 Aug 1976 | Doncaster | 5–54 | Featherstone Rovers | Bentley Road Stadium/Tattersfield | | | | |
| 5 | Sun 22 Aug 1976 | Halifax | 21–11 | York | Thrum Hall | | | | |
| 6 | Sun 22 Aug 1976 | Huddersfield | 18–26 | Dewsbury | Fartown | | | | |
| 7 | Sun 22 Aug 1976 | Hull Kingston Rovers | 12–18 | Castleford | Craven Park (1) | | | | |
| 8 | Sun 22 Aug 1976 | New Hunslet | 16–8 | Hull F.C. | Elland Road Greyhound Stadium | | | | |

=== Round 2 - Quarter-finals ===
Involved 4 matches and 8 clubs

| Game No | Fixture date | Home team | Score | Away team | Venue | Att | Rec | Notes | Ref |
|---|---|---|---|---|---|---|---|---|---|
| 1 | Fri 27 Aug 1976 | Castleford | 12–12 | Leeds | Wheldon Road | | | | |
| 2 | Sun 29 Aug 1976 | Halifax | 14–26 | Dewsbury | Thrum Hall | | | | |
| 3 | Sun 29 Aug 1976 | New Hunslet | 24–1 | Keighley | Elland Road Greyhound Stadium | | | | |
| 4 | Sun 29 Aug 1976 | Wakefield Trinity | 9–16 | Featherstone Rovers | Belle Vue | | | | |

=== Round 2 - replays ===
Involved 1 match and 2 clubs

| Game No | Fixture date | Home team | Score | Away team | Venue | Att | Rec | Notes | Ref |
|---|---|---|---|---|---|---|---|---|---|
| R | Tue 31 Aug 1976 | Leeds | 21–20 | Castleford | Headingley | | | | |

=== Round 3 – Semi-finals ===
Involved 2 matches and 4 clubs

| Game No | Fixture date | Home team | Score | Away team | Venue | Att | Rec | Notes | Ref |
|---|---|---|---|---|---|---|---|---|---|
| 1 | Wed 8 Sep 1976 | Featherstone Rovers | 34–0 | New Hunslet | Post Office Road | | | | |
| 2 | Tue 21 Sep 1976 | Leeds | 31–15 | Dewsbury | Headingley | | | | |

=== Final ===
| Game No | Fixture date | Home team | Score | Away team | Venue | Att | Rec | Notes | Ref |
|---|---|---|---|---|---|---|---|---|---|
| | Saturday 16 October 1976 | Leeds | 16–12 | Featherstone Rovers | Headingley | 7645 | 5198 | (Note: The attendance is given as 7,644 by RUGBYLEAGUEproject but the Rothmans Rugby League Yearbook of 1991-92 and 1990-91 gives the attendance as one more at 7,645) (Note: Headingley, Leeds, is the home ground of Leeds RLFC with a capacity of 21,000. The record attendance was 40,175 for a league match between Leeds and Bradford Northern on 21 May 1947.) | |

==== Teams and scorers ====
| Leeds | No. | Featherstone Rovers |
|---|---|---|
| | teams | |
| Marshall | 1 | Harold Box |
| Neil Hague | 2 | Graham Bray |
| Syd Hynes | 3 | Paul Coventry |
| Les Dyl | 4 | Steve Quinn |
| David Smith | 5 | Ken Kellett |
| John Holmes | 6 | John Newlove |
| Peter Banner | 7 | Dale Fennell |
| Roy Dickinson | 8 | Michael "Mick" Gibbins |
| David Ward | 9 | John "Keith" Bridges |
| Steve Pitchford | 10 | Vince Farrar |
| Graham Eccles | 11 | Richard 'Charlie' Stone |
| Chris Burton | 12 | Peter Smith |
| Phil Cookson | 13 | Keith Bell |
| Christopher Sanderson | 14 | Neil Tuffs |
| ? | 15 | Johnny Spells (for Keith Bell) |
| Syd Hynes | Coach | Keith Cotton |
| 16 | score | 12 |
| 11 | HT | 5 |
| | Scorers | |
| | Tries | |
| Les Dyl (2) | T | Graham Bray (1) |
| Graham Eccles (1) | T | Peter Smith (1) |
| Phil Cookson (1) | T | |
| | Goals | |
| Marshall (2) | G | Steve Quinn (3) |
| Referee | | Michael "Mick" J. Naughton (Widnes) |
| White Rose Trophy for Man of the match | | Les Dyl - Leeds - Centre |
| sponsored by | | |
| Competition Sponsor | | Esso |

Scoring - Try = three points - Goal = two points - Drop goal = one point

=== The road to success ===
First round
Bradford
Bramley
Wakefield Trinity
Leeds
Keighley
New Blackpool
York
Batley
Hull Kingston Rovers
Pontefract
Dewsbury
Huddersfield
Hull
Halifax
Hunslet
bye

Second round
Bradford
Leeds
Keighley
York
Hull Kingston Rovers
Huddersfield
Halifax
Hunslet

Semi-finals
Bradford
Keighley
Hull Kingston Rovers
Halifax

Final
Bradford | 8
Hull Kingston Rovers | 5

== See also ==
- 1976–77 Northern Rugby Football League season
- Rugby league county cups
