= David Smith (rugby league, born 1953) =

England international rugby league footballer

Personal information
- Full name: David Smith
- Born: 24 May 1953 (age 72); Dewsbury, England

Playing information
- Position: Wing, Centre
Club
| Years | Team | Pld | T | G | FG | P |
|---|---|---|---|---|---|---|
| 1971–76 | Wakefield Trinity | 170 | 115 | 5 | 0 | 355 |
| 1976–81 | Leeds |
| 1981–85 | Bradford Northern |
| | Total | 170 | 115 | 5 | 0 | 355 |
Representative
| Years | Team | Pld | T | G | FG | P |
| 1975–77 | Yorkshire | 5 | 4 | 0 | 0 | 12 |
| 1975–77 | England | 2 | 1 | 0 | 0 | 3 |

David Smith (born 24 May 1953) is an English former professional rugby league footballer who played in the 1970s and 1980s. He played at representative level for England and Yorkshire, and at club level for Wakefield Trinity, Leeds and Bradford Northern, as a wing or centre.

== Background ==
David Smith was born in Dewsbury, West Riding of Yorkshire, England, he has worked as a wholesale butcher.

== Playing career ==
=== Wakefield Trinity ===
David Smith started his professional career at Wakefield Trinity, signing from Shaw Cross. He made his debut for the club in August 1971.

Smith played right wing in Wakefield Trinity's 2–7 defeat by Leeds in the 1973 Yorkshire Cup Final during the 1973–74 season at Headingley, Leeds on Saturday 20 October 1973, and played right wing, and scored a try in the 13–16 defeat by Hull Kingston Rovers in the 1974 Yorkshire Cup Final during the 1974–75 season at Headingley, Leeds on Saturday 26 October 1974.

Fred Smith's record for the most tries for Wakefield Trinity in a season set during the 1959–60 season with 38-tries was equalled by David Smith in the 1973–74 season.

=== Leeds ===
In August 1976, Smith was signed by Leeds for a fee of £11,000.

Smith appeared as a substitute (replacing right wing Alan Smith) in Leeds' 16–7 victory over Widnes in the 1977 Challenge Cup Final during the 1976–77 season at Wembley Stadium, London on Saturday 7 May 1977, in front of a crowd of 80,871, and played right wing in the 14–12 victory over St Helens in the 1978 Challenge Cup Final during the 1977–78 season at Wembley Stadium, London on Saturday 13 May 1978, in front of a crowd of 96,000.

He played left wing in Leeds' 16–12 victory over Featherstone Rovers in the 1976 Yorkshire Cup Final during the 1976–77 season at Headingley, Leeds on Saturday 16 October 1976, played right-centre and scored a try in the 15–6 victory over Halifax in the 1979 Yorkshire Cup Final during the 1979–80 season at Headingley, Leeds on Saturday 27 October 1979, and played right-centre in the 8–7 victory over Hull Kingston Rovers in the 1980 Yorkshire Cup Final during the 1980–81 season at Fartown Ground, Huddersfield on Saturday 8 November 1980.

=== Bradford Northern ===
Smith appeared as a substitute (replacing left wing Steve Pullen) in Bradford Northern's 7–18 defeat by Hull F.C. in the 1982 Yorkshire Cup Final during the 1982–83 season at Elland Road, Leeds on Saturday 2 October 1982.

=== Representative honours ===
Smith won two caps for England while at Wakefield Trinity in 1975 against Australia, and while at Leeds in 1977 against France.

Smith also represented Yorkshire while at Wakefield Trinity.
