= 1975–76 Yorkshire Cup =

English rugby league competition

- Structure: Regional knockout championship
- Teams: 16
- Winners: Leeds
- Runners-up: Hull Kingston Rovers

The 1975–76 Yorkshire Cup was the sixty-eighth occasion on which the Yorkshire Cup competition had been held.

Leeds won the trophy by beating Hull Kingston Rovers by the score of 15–11

The match was played at Headingley, Leeds, now in West Yorkshire. The attendance was 5,743 and receipts were £3,617

This was Leeds' fifth victory (and the first of two consecutive victories) in what would be eight times in the space of thirteen seasons.

== Background ==
This season there were no junior/amateur clubs taking part, no new entrants and no "leavers" and so the total of entries remained the same at sixteen.

This in turn resulted in no byes in the first round.

== Competition and results ==
=== Round 1 ===
Involved 8 matches (with no byes) and 16 clubs

Game No	Fixture date	Home team	Score	Away team	Venue	Att	Rec	Notes	Ref
1	Fri 29 Aug 1975	Castleford	16–16	Hull F.C.	Wheldon Road				
2	Sat 30 Aug 1975	Huddersfield	7–19	Featherstone Rovers	Fartown				
3	Sat 30 Aug 1975	Leeds	32–5	Halifax	Headingley				
4	Sun 31 Aug 1975	Bradford Northern	28–12	Bramley	Odsal				
5	Sun 31 Aug 1975	Doncaster	11–18	Keighley	Bentley Road Stadium/Tattersfield				
6	Sun 31 Aug 1975	Hull Kingston Rovers	26–9	Wakefield Trinity	Craven Park (1)				
7	Sun 31 Aug 1975	New Hunslet	20–5	Batley	Elland Road Greyhound Stadium				
8	Sun 31 Aug 1975	York	18–12	Dewsbury	Clarence Street				

=== Round 1 - replays ===
Involved 1 match and 2 clubs

Game No	Fixture date	Home team	Score	Away team	Venue	Att	Rec	Notes	Ref
R	Tue 2 Sep 1975	Hull F.C.	15–16	Castleford	Boulevard				

=== Round 2 - Quarter-finals ===
Involved 4 matches and 8 clubs

Game No	Fixture date	Home team	Score	Away team	Venue	Att	Rec	Notes	Ref
1	Sat 13 Sep 1975	Bradford Northern	2–22	Leeds	Odsal				
2	Sun 14 Sep 1975	Featherstone Rovers	8–5	Castleford	Post Office Road				
3	Sun 14 Sep 1975	New Hunslet	7–15	Hull Kingston Rovers	Elland Road Greyhound Stadium				
4	Sun 14 Sep 1975	York	13–16	Keighley	Clarence Street				

=== Round 3 – Semi-finals ===
Involved 2 matches and 4 clubs

Game No	Fixture date	Home team	Score	Away team	Venue	Att	Rec	Notes	Ref
1	Tue 23 Sep 1975	Hull Kingston Rovers	19–16	Featherstone Rovers	Craven Park (1)				
2	Wed 1 Oct 1975	Keighley	2–11	Leeds	Lawkholme Lane				

=== Final ===
Game No	Fixture date	Home team	Score	Away team	Venue	Att	Rec	Notes	Ref
	Saturday 15 November 1975	Leeds	15–11	Hull Kingston Rovers	Headingley	5,743	£3,617	(Note: The attendance is given as 5,304 by RUGBYLEAGUEproject but the Rothmans Rugby League Yearbook of 1991-92 and 1990-91 gives the attendance at 5,734) (Note: Headingley, Leeds, is the home ground of Leeds RLFC with a capacity of 21,000. The record attendance was 40,175 for a league match between Leeds and Bradford Northern on 21 May 1947.)	

==== Teams and scorers ====
Leeds	№	Hull Kingston Rovers
	teams	
Dave Marshall	1	Richard Wallace
Alan Smith	2	Gerald "Ged" Dunn
Neil Hague	3	Alan Burwell
Les Dyl	4	Bernard Watson
John Atkinson	5	Clive Sullivan
John Holmes	6	Glyn Turner
Syd Hynes	7	Roger Millward
Mick Harrison	8	John Millington
Ian Payne	9	Clifford "Cliff" Dickinson
Steve Pitchford	10	Steve Lyons
Graham Eccles	11	Paul Rose
Ray Batten	12	Neil Fox
Phil Cookson	13	Mick Hughes/R. Hughes
Christopher Sanderson	14	?
Roy Dickinson (for Steve Pitchford)	15	Roy Holdstock (for Hughes)
Syd Hynes	Coach	Arthur Bunting
15	score	11
7	HT	3
	Scorers	
	Tries	
Les Dyl (1)	T	Clive Sullivan (1)
Phil Cookson (1)	T	Neil Fox (1)
	Goals	
John Holmes (4)	G	Neil Fox (2)
	Drop Goals	
John Holmes (1)	DG	Roger Millward (1)
Referee		J. V. Moss (Manchester)
Man of the match		Neil Fox - Hull KR - Second-row
sponsored by		Esso
White Rose Trophy for Man of the match		

Scoring - Try = three points - Goal = two points - Drop goal = one point

=== The road to success ===
First round
York	18
Dewsbury	12
Doncaster	11
Keighley	18
Bradford Northern	28
Bramley	12
Leeds	32
Halifax	5
New Hunslet	20
Batley	5
Hull Kingston Rovers	26
Wakefield Trinity	9
Huddersfield	7
Featherstone Rovers	19
Castleford	16 (16)
Hull F.C.	16 (15)

Second round
York	13
Keighley	16
Bradford Northern	2
Leeds	22
New Hunslet	7
Hull Kingston Rovers	15
Featherstone Rovers	8
Castleford	5

Semi-finals
Keighley	2
Leeds	11
Hull Kingston Rovers	19
Featherstone Rovers	16

Final
Leeds	15
Hull Kingston Rovers	1

== See also ==
- 1975–76 Northern Rugby Football League season
- Rugby league county cups
