= Mark Conway (rugby league) =

English rugby league footballer

Personal information
- Born: 31 January 1964 (age 62) Outwood, Wakefield, England

Playing information
- Position: Scrum-half, Stand-off
Club
Years	Team	Pld	T	G	FG	P
1981–87	Leeds	112	37	124	0	390
1987–93	Wakefield Trinity	175	54	320	9	865
1993–97	Dewsbury	55	13	25	0	102
1998	Doncaster Dragons	10	1	2	0	8
	Total	352	105	471	9	1365
Representative
Years	Team	Pld	T	G	FG	P
1984	Great Britain U-21	1	1	0	0	4

Mark Conway (born 31 January 1964) is an English former professional rugby league footballer who played in the 1980s and 1990s. He played at representative level for Yorkshire Under-13s, Yorkshire Under-16s, Yorkshire Colts (Under-19s), England Schools Under-16s, Great Britain Colts (Under-19s, including the first ever Colts tour to Australia, and Papua New Guinea in 1982), and Great Britain Under-21s, and at club level for Stanley Rangers ARLFC, Leeds, Wakefield Trinity (captain), Dewsbury Rams and Doncaster Dragons for coach Colin Maskill, as a scrum-half and occasionally stand-off. As of 2017, he still holds Wakefield Trinity's 'most goals in a match' record with 13-goals scored in the 90–12 victory over Highfield during the 1992–93 Regal Trophy preliminary round during the 1992–93 season at Belle Vue, Wakefield, on Tuesday 27 October 1992.

== Playing career ==
=== County Cup Final appearances ===
Mark Conway played scrum-half in Wakefield Trinity's 8–11 defeat by Castleford in the 1990–91 Yorkshire Cup Final during the 1990–91 season at Elland Road, Leeds on Sunday 23 September 1990.

=== Notable tour matches ===
Mark Conway played scrum-half, and scored two goals in Leeds' 4–31 defeat by Australia in the 1982 Kangaroo tour of Great Britain and France match at Headingley, Leeds on Wednesday 20 October 1982, played scrum-half in the 10–16 defeat by New Zealand in the 1985 New Zealand rugby league tour of Great Britain and France match at Headingley, Leeds on Tuesday 29 October 1985, and played scrum-half, and scored 3-goals in Wakefield Trinity's 18–36 defeat by Australia in the 1990 Kangaroo tour of Great Britain and France match at Belle Vue Wakefield on Wednesday 10 October 1990.

=== Club career ===
Mark Conway played scrum-half, and he made his début in Leeds' victory over Bramley in the Lazenby Cup at Headingley in 1981, that was to be his only appearance in the starting line-up during the 1981–82 season as the understudy to Kevin Dick, Conway spent five seasons with Leeds competing with Kevin Dick and Cliff Lyons for the Scrum-half position, and he produced a number of memorable performances in cup ties.

In August 1987, the Leeds players; Mark Conway, Phil ip Fox, Andy Mason and Keith Rayne, were transferred in exchange for the Wakefield Trinity players; John Lyons, and Gary Spencer.

Mark Conway is sixth on the all-time Wakefield Trinity goal kicking list, and fourth on the all-time Wakefield Trinity points scoring list.

== Outside of Rugby League ==
Mark was a pupil at Newton Hill Junior School, and Outwood Grange School, and is a former coach at Stanley Rangers ARLFC, and as of 2017 he is a franchise sales director at 9ROUND Fitness UK. He has a daughter Danielle, (born c. 1987 (age 38–39)), and a son Matt, (born c. 1991 (age 34–35)).
