= Graham Eccles =

English rugby league footballer

Personal information
- Full name: Graham Eccles
- Born: 19 May 1949 (age 77) Leeds, England

Playing information
- Position: Prop, Second-row, Loose forward
Club
Years	Team	Pld	T	G	FG	P
1969–82	Leeds	389	63	0	0	189
1982–83	Wakefield Trinity	20	0	0	0	0
	Total	409	63	0	0	189

Graham Eccles (born 19 May 1949) is an English former professional rugby league footballer who played in the 1960s, 1970s and 1980s. He played at club level for Leeds, and Wakefield Trinity, as a prop, second-row or loose forward.

== Background ==
Eccles was born in Leeds, West Riding of Yorkshire, England.

== Playing career ==
=== Championship final appearances ===
Graham Eccles played in Leeds' 12-24 defeat by St Helens in the Championship Final during the 1969–70 season at Odsal Stadium, Bradford on Saturday 16 May 1970, and in the 9-5 victory over St. Helens in the Championship Final during the 1971–72 season at Station Road, Swinton on Saturday 20 May 1972.

=== Challenge Cup Final appearances ===
Graham Eccles played left-second-row in Leeds' 16-7 victory over Widnes in the 1976–77 Challenge Cup Final during the 1976–77 season at Wembley Stadium, London on Saturday 7 May 1977, in front of a crowd of 80,871, and played left-second-row in the 14-12 victory over St. Helens in the 1977–78 Challenge Cup Final during the 1977–78 season at Wembley Stadium, London on Saturday 13 May 1978, in front of a crowd of 96,000.

=== County Cup Final appearances ===
Graham Eccles played right-second-row and scored a try in Leeds' 36-9 victory over Dewsbury in the 1972–73 Yorkshire Cup Final during the 1972–73 season at Odsal Stadium, Bradford on Saturday 7 October 1972, played left-second-row in the 7-2 victory over Wakefield Trinity in the 1973–74 Yorkshire Cup Final during the 1973–74 season at Headingley, Leeds on Saturday 20 October 1973, played left-second-row in the 15-11 victory over Hull Kingston Rovers in the 1975–76 Yorkshire Cup Final during the 1975–76 season at Headingley, Leeds on Saturday 15 November 1975, played left-second-row, and scored a try in the 16-12 victory over Featherstone Rovers in the 1976–77 Yorkshire Cup Final during the 1976–77 season at Headingley, Leeds on Saturday 16 October 1976, played left-second-row in the 15-6 victory over Halifax in the 1979–80 Yorkshire Cup Final during the 1979–80 season at Headingley, Leeds on Saturday 27 October 1979, and played left-second-row in the 8-7 victory over Hull Kingston Rovers in the 1980–81 Yorkshire Cup Final during the 1980–81 season at Fartown Ground, Huddersfield on Saturday 8 November 1980.

=== Player's No.6 Trophy Final appearances ===
Graham Eccles played loose forward in Leeds' 12-7 victory over Salford in the 1972–73 Player's No.6 Trophy Final during the 1972–73 season at Fartown Ground, Huddersfield on Saturday 24 March 1973.

=== Club career ===
Graham Eccles scored a try on his début for Leeds', as did fellow débutante Phil Cookson, against Bradford Northern on Saturday 19 April 1969. During the 1976–77 season Graham Eccles was named Leeds' Player of the Year, and during that season he played in 43 of the 47 Leeds games played, he played in fourteen finals for Leeds, and collected winners medals in all the major competitions, after 13-years at Leeds he was transferred to Wakefield Trinity, making his début during January 1982, ending his rugby league career during the 1982–83 season.
