= Phil Cookson =

England international rugby league footballer

Personal information
- Full name: Philip Cookson
- Born: 2 February 1951 (age 75) Featherstone, England

Playing information
- Position: Second-row
Club
Years	Team	Pld	T	G	FG	P
1969–81	Leeds	391	114	10	0	362
Representative
Years	Team	Pld	T	G	FG	P
1975	England	3	0	0	0	0

Philip Cookson (born 2 February 1951) is an English former professional rugby league footballer who played in the 1960s, 1970s and 1980s. He played at representative level for England, and at club level for Leeds, as a second-row.

== Background ==
Phil Cookson was born in Featherstone, West Riding of Yorkshire, England.

== Playing career ==
=== Challenge Cup Final appearances ===
Cookson was an unused substitute in Leeds' 7-24 defeat by Leigh in the 1971 Challenge Cup Final during the 1970–71 season at Wembley Stadium, London on Saturday 15 May 1971, in front of a crowd of 85,514, played right-second-row in the 13-16 defeat by St. Helens in the 1972 Challenge Cup Final during the 1971–72 season at Wembley Stadium, London on Saturday 13 May 1972, in front of a crowd of 89,495, played right-second-row in the 16-7 victory over Widnes in the 1977 Challenge Cup Final during the 1976–77 season at Wembley Stadium, London on Saturday 7 May 1977, in front of a crowd of 80,871, and played right-second-row, and with five minutes remaining scored a try in the 14-12 victory over St. Helens in the 1978 Challenge Cup Final during the 1977–78 season at Wembley Stadium, London on Saturday 13 May 1978, in front of a crowd of 96,000.

=== County Cup Final appearances ===
Cookson played right-prop in Leeds' 23-7 victory over Featherstone Rovers in the 1970 Yorkshire Cup Final during the 1970–71 season at Odsal Stadium, Bradford on Saturday 21 November 1970, played left-second-row in the 36-9 victory over Dewsbury in the 1972 Yorkshire Cup Final during the 1972–73 season at Odsal Stadium, Bradford on Saturday 7 October 1972, played right-second-row in the 7-2 victory over Wakefield Trinity in the 1973 Yorkshire Cup Final during the 1973–74 season at Headingley, Leeds on Saturday 20 October 1973, played loose forward in the 15-11 victory over Hull Kingston Rovers in the 1975 Yorkshire Cup Final during the 1975–76 season at Headingley, Leeds on Saturday 15 November 1975, played loose forward in the 16-12 victory over Featherstone Rovers in the 1976 Yorkshire Cup Final during the 1976–77 season at Headingley, Leeds on Saturday 16 October 1976, played loose forward in the 15-6 victory over Halifax in the 1979 Yorkshire Cup Final during the 1979–80 season at Headingley, Leeds on Saturday 27 October 1979, and played right-second-row (replaced by substitute Carrol) in the 8-7 victory over Hull Kingston Rovers in the 1980 Yorkshire Cup Final during the 1980–81 season at Fartown Ground, Huddersfield on Saturday 8 November 1980.

=== Player's No.6 Trophy Final appearances ===
Cookson played right-second-row in Leeds' 12-7 victory over Salford in the 1972–73 Player's No.6 Trophy Final during the 1972–73 season at Fartown Ground, Huddersfield on Saturday 24 March 1973.

=== Testimonial match ===
Cookson's Testimonial match at Leeds took place in the 1978/79 season.

=== Club career ===
Cookson scored a try on his début for Leeds, as did fellow débutant Graham Eccles, against Bradford Northern on Saturday 19 April 1969.

=== International honours ===
Cookson won caps for England while at Leeds in the 1975 Rugby League World Cup against New Zealand, and Australia, and in 1975 against Papua New Guinea (non-Test).
