= Neil Hague (rugby league) =

English rugby league footballer

Personal information
- Full name: Neil Hague
- Born: 7 September 1953 (age 73) Leeds, England

Playing information
- Position: Fullback, Wing, Centre, Stand-off, Scrum-half
Club
Years	Team	Pld	T	G	FG	P
1973–86	Leeds	411	87	2	7	288
1986–87	Halifax	28	3	0	2	14
1987–88	York	35	5	0	6	26
1988–89	Hunslet	25	0	0	8	8
	Total	499	95	2	23	336
Representative
Years	Team	Pld	T	G	FG	P
1977–81	Yorkshire	4	0	0	0	0

Neil Hague (born 7 September 1953) is an English former professional rugby league footballer who played in the 1970s and 1980s. He played at club level for Leeds, Halifax and York as a fullback, wing, centre, stand-off, or scrum-half.

== Background ==
Hague was born in Leeds, West Riding of Yorkshire, England.

== Playing career ==
=== Championship final appearances ===
Hague played fullback in Leeds' 24–2 victory over Bradford Northern in the Championship Final during the 1978–79 season.

=== Challenge Cup Final appearances ===
Hague played right-centre in Leeds' 16–7 victory over Widnes in the 1976–77 Challenge Cup Final during the 1976–77 season at Wembley Stadium, London on Saturday 7 May 1977, in front of a crowd of 80,871, and played right-centre in the 14–12 victory over St. Helens in the 1977–78 Challenge Cup Final during the 1977–78 season at Wembley Stadium, London on Saturday 13 May 1978, in front of a crowd of 96,000.

=== County Cup Final appearances ===
Hague played right-centre in Leeds' 15–11 victory over Hull Kingston Rovers in the 1975–76 Yorkshire Cup Final during the 1975–76 season at Headingley, Leeds on Saturday 15 November 1975, played right wing in the 15–6 victory over Halifax in the 1976–77 Yorkshire Cup Final during the 1976–77 season at Headingley, Leeds on Saturday 16 October 1976, played fullback in the 15–6 victory over Halifax in the 1979–80 Yorkshire Cup Final during the 1979–80 season at Headingley, Leeds on Saturday 27 October 1979, and played left-centre or according to Rothmans Yearbooks 1990-91 and 1991–92, fullback, in the 8–7 victory over Hull Kingston Rovers in the 1980–81 Yorkshire Cup Final during the 1980–81 season at Fartown Ground, Huddersfield on Saturday 8 November 1980.

=== John Player Trophy Final appearances ===
Hague played fullback in Leeds' 4–15 defeat by Wigan in the 1982–83 John Player Trophy Final during the 1982–83 season at Elland Road, Leeds on Saturday 22 January 1983.

=== Club career ===
Hague joined Leeds in March 1973, and made his début for Leeds against Wakefield Trinity on Sunday 15 December 1974.

=== Testimonial match ===
Hague's Testimonial match at Leeds took place in 1984.
