= Steve Pitchford =

GB international rugby league footballer

Personal information
- Full name: Stephen Pitchford
- Born: 6 February 1952 (age 73); Leeds, England

Playing information
- Position: Prop
Club
Years	Team	Pld	T	G	FG	P
1971–80	Leeds	315+12	37	0	0	111
1984–85	Bramley	22+1	2	0	0	8
	Total	350	39	0	0	119
Representative
Years	Team	Pld	T	G	FG	P
1977	Great Britain	4	1	0	0	3

Stephen Pitchford (born 6 February 1952) is an English former professional rugby league footballer who played in the 1970s and 1980s. He played at representative level for Great Britain, and at club level for Leeds and Bramley as a prop.

== Background ==
Pitchford was born in Leeds, West Riding of Yorkshire, England.

He was a pupil at Foxwood School, Seacroft, Leeds.

== Playing career ==
=== International honours ===
Pitchford won caps for Great Britain while at Leeds in the 1977 Rugby League World Cup against France, New Zealand, and Australia (2 matches).

=== Challenge Cup Final appearances ===
Pitchford played at prop and was voted Man of the Match winning the Lance Todd Trophy in Leeds' 16-7 victory over Widnes in the 1977 Challenge Cup Final during the 1976–77 season at Wembley Stadium, London on Saturday 7 May 1977, in front of a crowd of 80,871, and played at prop in the 14-12 victory over St. Helens in the 1978 Challenge Cup Final during the 1977–78 season at Wembley Stadium, London on Saturday 13 May 1978, in front of a crowd of 96,000.

=== County Cup Final appearances ===
Pitchford played at prop (replaced by substitute Roy Dickinson) in Leeds' 15-11 victory over Hull Kingston Rovers in the 1975 Yorkshire Cup Final during the 1975–76 season at Headingley, Leeds on Saturday 15 November 1975, played at prop in the 15-6 victory over Featherstone Rovers in the 1976 Yorkshire Cup Final during the 1976–77 season at Headingley, Leeds on Saturday 16 October 1976, played at prop in the 15-6 victory over Halifax in the 1979 Yorkshire Cup Final during the 1979–80 season at Headingley, Leeds on Saturday 27 October 1979, and played at prop in the 8-7 victory over Hull Kingston Rovers in the 1980 Yorkshire Cup Final during the 1980–81 season at Fartown Ground, Huddersfield on Saturday 8 November 1980.

=== Open Rugby inaugural World XIII ===
The Open Rugby inaugural World XIII was revealed in June 1978, it was; Graham Eadie, John Atkinson, Steve Rogers, Jean-Marc Bourret, Green Vigo, Roger Millward, Steve Nash, Jim Mills, Keith Elwell, Steve Pitchford, Terry Randall, George Nicholls and Greg Pierce.

== Work life ==
During the period that Pitchford played for the Leeds side, the players were not full-time professionals. Pitchford worked as a highly skilled miller in several Engineering companies in Leeds and was held in high regard at Crabtree Vickers, the Printing Press manufacturers on Water Lane in the City, and, after the closure of that company, at the Royal Ordnance Factory (ROF) at Barnbow in East Leeds, where he was renowned for his good nature. He also ran a public house, in Eastfield, North Yorkshire for many years. He also was landlord of the Leodis public house in Halton in the mid eighties.

== Honours ==
- Open Rugby World XIII: 1978
