= Mick Gibbins =

English rugby league footballer

Personal information
- Full name: Michael Gibbins

Playing information
- Position: Prop, Second-row
Club
| Years | Team | Pld | T | G | FG | P |
|---|---|---|---|---|---|---|
| 1971–86 | Featherstone Rovers | 333 | 12 | 0 | 0 | 36 |
| 1986–87 | Hull FC | 4 | 0 | 0 | 0 | 0 |
| | Total | 337 | 12 | 0 | 0 | 36 |
Representative
| Years | Team | Pld | T | G | FG | P |
| 1977 | Great Britain U24 | 2 | 0 | 0 | 0 | 0 |
| 1979 | Yorkshire | 2 | 0 | 0 | 0 | 0 |

Michael "Mick" Gibbins is an English former professional rugby league footballer who played in the 1970s and 1980s. He played at representative level for Yorkshire, and at club level for Featherstone Rovers and Hull FC, as a prop or second-row.

== Playing career ==
=== Club career ===
Gibbins made his début for Featherstone Rovers on Tuesday 7 September 1971.

Gibbins played at prop in Featherstone Rovers' 12–16 defeat by Leeds in the 1976 Yorkshire Cup Final during the 1976–77 season at Headingley, Leeds on Saturday 16 October 1976, and played at second-row in the 7–17 defeat by Castleford in the 1977 Yorkshire Cup Final during the 1977–78 season at Headingley, Leeds on Saturday 15 October 1977.

Gibbins played at prop in Featherstone Rovers' 14–12 victory over Hull F.C. in the 1983 Challenge Cup Final during the 1982–83 season at Wembley on Saturday 7 May 1983, in front of a crowd of 84,969.

Gibbins' benefit season/testimonial match at Featherstone Rovers took place during the 1982–83 season.

=== Representative Honours ===
Gibbins won a cap for Yorkshire while at Featherstone Rovers; during the 1979–80 season against Cumbria.

== Honoured at Featherstone Rovers ==
Gibbins is a Featherstone Rovers Hall of Fame inductee.

== Personal life ==
Mick Gibbins is the brother of the rugby league footballer who played in the 1970s for Featherstone Rovers; Brian Gibbins. His step-son, also called Michael "Tugga" Gibbins, played professional rugby league with Dewsbury Rams RLFC.
