= 1979–80 Yorkshire Cup =

- Structure: Regional knockout championship
- Teams: 16
- Winners: Leeds
- Runners-up: Halifax

The 1979–80 Yorkshire Cup was the seventy-second occasion on which the Yorkshire Cup competition had been held.

Leeds winning the trophy by beating Halifax by the score of 15–6

The match was played at Headingley, Leeds, now in West Yorkshire. The attendance was 9,137 and receipts were £9,999

This was Leeds' seventh victory (and the first of two consecutive victories for the third time within the sequence) in what would be eight times in the space of thirteen seasons.

This would be Halifax's last appearance in a Yorkshire Cup final, giving them a total record of five wins and four defeats.

== Background ==
This season there were no junior/amateur clubs taking part, no new entrants and no "leavers" and so the total of entries remained the same at sixteen.

This in turn resulted in no byes in the first round.

== Competition and results ==
=== Round 1 ===
Involved 8 matches (with no byes) and 16 clubs

Game No	Fixture date	Home team	Score	Away team	Venue	Att	Rec	Notes	Ref
1	Fri 17 Aug 1979	Bramley	5–12	Halifax	McLaren Field				
2	Sun 19 Aug 1979	Leeds	26–14	Castleford	Headingley				
3	Sun 19 Aug 1979	Dewsbury	16–15	York	Crown Flatt				
4	Sun 19 Aug 1979	Huddersfield	7–22	Bradford Northern	Fartown				
5	Sun 19 Aug 1979	Hull F.C.	13–19	Featherstone Rovers	Boulevard				
6	Sun 19 Aug 1979	Hunslet	33–12	Keighley	Mount Pleasant			(Note: This was the first Yorkshire Cup match played by the renamed Hunslet at their "new" temporary home at Batley's Mount Pleasant after the owners of Elland Road Greyhound Stadium suddenly closed the previous ground)	
7	Sun 19 Aug 1979	Wakefield Trinity	28–16	Hull Kingston Rovers	Belle Vue				
8	Sun 19 Aug 1979	Batley	26–14	Doncaster	venue unknown				

=== Round 2 - Quarter-finals ===
Involved 4 matches and 8 clubs

Game No	Fixture date	Home team	Score	Away team	Venue	Att	Rec	Notes	Ref
1	Sun 26 Aug 1979	Batley	6–29	Leeds	Mount Pleasant				
2	Sun 26 Aug 1979	Bradford Northern	5–30	Wakefield Trinity	Odsal				
3	Sun 26 Aug 1979	Featherstone Rovers	16–17	Dewsbury	Post Office Road				
4	Sun 26 Aug 1979	Halifax	23–12	Hunslet	Thrum Hall				

=== Round 3 – Semi-finals ===
Involved 2 matches and 4 clubs

Game No	Fixture date	Home team	Score	Away team	Venue	Att	Rec	Notes	Ref
1	Wed 19 Sep 1979	Wakefield Trinity	7–12	Leeds	Belle Vue				
2	Thu 20 Sep 1979	Halifax	5–3	Dewsbury	Thrum Hall				

=== Final ===
Game No	Fixture date	Home team	Score	Away team	Venue	Att	Rec	Notes	Ref
	Saturday 27 October 1979	Leeds	15–6	Halifax	Headingley	9,137	£9,999	(Note: The attendance is given as 9,134 by RUGBYLEAGUEproject but the Rothmans Rugby League Yearbook of 1991-92 and 1990-91 gives the attendance as three more at 9,137) (Note: Headingley, Leeds, is the home ground of Leeds RLFC with a capacity of 21,000. The record attendance was 40,175 for a league match between Leeds and Bradford Northern on 21 May 1947.)	

==== Teams and scorers ====
Leeds	No.	Halifax
	teams	
Neil Hague	1	Jimmy Birts
Alan Smith	2	Derek Howard
David Smith	3	Graham Garrod
Les Dyl	4	David Cholmondeley
John Atkinson	5	Keith Waites
John Holmes	6	Bob Blacker
Kevin Dick	7	Terry Langton
Roy Dickinson	8	Peter Jarvis
David Ward	9	Dean Raistrick
Steve Pitchford	10	Alan Wood
Graham Eccles	11	Mick Scott
David Heron	12	Greg Sharp
Phil Cookson	13	David Busfield
John Sanderson	14	Mick Snee (for Derek Howard)
Bryan Adams (for David Heron)	15	David Callon (for Peter Jarvis)
Syd Hynes	Coach	Maurice Bamford
15	score	6
10	HT	6
	Scorers	
	Tries	
Alan Smith (2)	T	
David Smith (1)	T	
	Goals	
Kevin Dick (3)	G	Jimmy Birts (3)
Referee		Michael "Mick" J. Naughton (Widnes)
White Rose Trophy for Man of the match		Alan Smith - Leeds - Wing
sponsored by		
Competition Sponsor		Esso

Scoring - Try = three points - Goal = two points - Drop goal = one point

=== The road to success ===
First round
Huddersfield	7
Bradford Northern	22
Wakefield Trinity	28
Hull Kingston Rovers	16
Batley	26
Doncaster	14
Leeds	26
Castleford	14
Bramley	5
Halifax	12
Hunslet	33
Keighley	12
Hull F.C.	13
Featherstone Rovers	19
Dewsbury	16
York	15

Second round
Bradford Northern	5
Wakefield Trinity	30
Batley	6
Leeds	29
Halifax	23
Hunslet	12
Featherstone Rovers	16
Dewsbury	17

Semi-finals
Wakefield Trinity	7
Leeds	12
Halifax	5
Dewsbury	3

Final
Leeds	15
Halifax	6

== See also ==
- 1979–80 Northern Rugby Football League season
- Rugby league county cups
