= Harry Jepson =

English rugby league administrator

- Born: 4 February 1920; Hunslet, Leeds, England
- Died: 29 August 2016 (aged 96)
- Occupation: Rugby league administrator

Harry Jepson OBE (4 February 1920 – 29 August 2016) was an English rugby league administrator and president of Leeds Rhinos.

== Early life ==
Born in Hunslet, Leeds, Jepson was educated at Cockburn High School and subsequently worked for Leeds City Council. After army service in the Second World War with the Duke of Wellington's Regiment and the Royal Army Service Corps, he returned to Leeds and trained as a teacher.

== Teaching and rugby careers ==
One of his first teaching appointments was at Bewerley Street School where the headmaster, Edgar Meeks, was also the chairman of Hunslet F.C. Jepson was a life-long fan of Hunslet F.C. (and Hunslet R.L.F.C.), and through Meeks he became involved with the administration of the Hunslet club, first as assistant secretary and from 1963 club secretary. While maintaining his teaching career, Jepson moved from Hunslet to Leeds at the request of the Leeds chairman, Jack Myersclough.

With a perennial interest in the development of young players, Jepson was heavily involved in the formation of the Colts League and chairman of the league until 1988 including managing the Colts tour to Australia and Papua New Guinea in 1982. Appointed at Director of Football at Leeds in 1983 he was instrumental in bringing stars like Eric Grothe and Andrew Ettingshausen to the club. In later years he was made club president of Leeds Rhinos and was also chairman of the Rugby League Conference. In this latter role he established a cup competition for clubs in the conference premier leagues and this was subsequently named after him - the Harry Jepson Trophy.

Jepson was an inaugural member of the Rugby Football League board of directors and was the chairman of the Rugby League Council when the decision to found the Super League was taken.

== Recognition ==
For services to rugby league, Jepson was appointed an Officer of the Order of the British Empire (OBE) in the Queen's Birthday honours list in 1996.

Shortly before his death in August 2016 he was made an honorary Doctor of Education by Leeds Beckett University.

In November 2016 Leeds Rhinos and Hunslet announced that the traditional pre-season friendly between the two clubs would be renamed the Harry Jepson OBE Memorial Cup, having previously been known as the Lazenby Cup.
