= 1977–78 Challenge Cup =

Rugby league competition

- Duration: 5 Rounds
- Number of teams: 32
- Highest attendance: 96,000
- Broadcast partners: BBC
- Winners: Leeds
- Runners-up: St. Helens
- Lance Todd Trophy: George Nicholls

The 1977–78 Challenge Cup was the 77th staging of rugby league's oldest knockout competition, the Challenge Cup.

The final was contested by Leeds and St. Helens at Wembley.

Leeds beat St. Helens on Saturday 13 May 1978 in front of a crowd of 96,000.

The winner of the Lance Todd Trophy was Saints forward, George Nicholls.

This was Leeds’ eleventh Cup final win in fifteen appearances and their second in successive years.

== First round ==
The first round consisted of all 30 professional rugby league clubs, plus two amateur teams, Dewsbury Celtic and Pilkington Recs.

The match between Leeds and Halifax was televised by the BBC, and became infamous for a stray dog which invaded the pitch several times during the match.

Date	Team one	Team two	Score
11 Feb	Leeds	Halifax	25-5
24 Feb	St Helens	Huyton	36-8
24 Feb	Salford	Bramley	9-7
25 Feb	York	Warrington	10-16
26 Feb	Blackpool	Huddersfield	7-9
26 Feb	Bradford Northern	Barrow	21-13
26 Feb	Dewsbury Celtic	Wigan	5-15
26 Feb	Dewsbury	New Hunslet	13-22
26 Feb	Hull FC	Hull Kingston Rovers	9-7
26 Feb	Leigh	Featherstone Rovers	14-23
26 Feb	Oldham	Doncaster	21-7
26 Feb	Pilkington Recs	Castleford	22-23
26 Feb	Swinton	Batley	13-0
26 Feb	Whitehaven	Wakefield Trinity	13-21
26 Feb	Widnes	Rochdale Hornets	15-8
26 Feb	Workington Town	Keighley	16-5

== Second round ==
Date	Team one	Team two	Score
11 Mar	Wigan	Bradford Northern	10-22
12 Mar	Featherstone Rovers	New Hunslet	23-7
12 Mar	Huddersfield	Salford	13-3
12 Mar	Hull FC	Widnes	8-20
12 Mar	Oldham	St Helens	11-26
12 Mar	Wakefield Trinity	Leeds	6-28
12 Mar	Warrington	Swinton	29-4
12 Mar	Workington Town	Castleford	8-8
14 Mar - replay	Castleford	Workington Town	8-8
16 Mar - 2nd replay	Workington Town	Castleford	13-20

== Quarter-finals ==
Date	Team one	Team two	Score
19 Mar	Featherstone Rovers	Castleford	25-15
19 Mar	Leeds	Bradford Northern	16-8
19 Mar	St Helens	Huddersfield	31-5
19 Mar	Warrington	Widnes	6-0

== Semi-finals ==
Date	Team one	Team two	Score
01 Apr	Leeds	Featherstone Rovers	14-9
08 Apr	St Helens	Warrington	12-8

== Final ==
13 May 1978

Leeds	14 – 12	St Helens
Try: Atkinson, Smith, Cookson; Goal: Oulton; Drop goal: Ward (2), Holmes	Report	Try: Liptrot, Francis; Goal: Pimblett (3)

Wembley, London
Attendance: 96,000
Referee: Billy Thompson (Huddersfield)
Player of the Match: George Nicholls

FB	1	Willie Oulton
RW	2	David Smith
RC	3	Neil Hague
LC	4	Les Dyl
LW	5	John Atkinson
SO	6	John Holmes
SH	7	John Sanderson	(substituted off) 60'
PR	8	Mick Harrison	(substituted off) 66'
HK	9	David Ward (c)
PR	10	Steve Pitchford
SR	11	Graham Eccles
SR	12	Phil Cookson
LF	13	Mick Crane
Substitutions:
IC	14	Kevin Dick	(substituted in) 60'
IC	15	Roy Dickinson	(substituted in) 66'
Coach:
Syd Hynes

FB	1	Geoff Pimblett (c)
RW	2	Les Jones
RC	3	Derek Noonan
LC	4	Peter Glynn
LW	5	Roy Mathias
SO	6	Bill Francis
SH	7	Ken Gwilliam
PR	8	Dave Chisnall
HK	9	Graham Liptrot
PR	10	Mel James
SR	11	George Nicholls
SR	12	Eddie Cunningham
LF	13	Harry Pinner
Substitutions:
IC	14	Alan Ashton
IC	15	Tony Karalius
Coach:
Eric Ashton
