= Mick Scott =

English rugby league footballer

Personal information
- Full name: Michael Scott
- Born: 23 September 1954 (age 72) Halifax, England

Playing information
- Position: Second-row, Loose forward
Club
Years	Team	Pld	T	G	FG	P
1974–81	Halifax	176	36	23	20	174
1981–85	Wigan	125	12	0	0	41
1985–91	Halifax	130	7	0	0	28
1988	York	9	0	0	0	0
	Total	440	55	23	20	243

Michael Scott (born 23 September 1954) is an English former professional rugby league footballer who played in the 1970s, 1980s and 1990s. He played at club level for Halifax (two spells), and Wigan, as a second-row, or loose forward.

== Background ==
Scott was born in Halifax, West Riding of Yorkshire, England.

== Playing career ==
=== Halifax ===
Scott played at second-row in Halifax's 6–15 defeat by Leeds in the 1979 Yorkshire Cup Final during the 1979–80 season at Headingley, Leeds on Saturday 27 October 1979.

=== Wigan ===
Scott was transferred to Wigan in August 1981 for a fee of £28,500.

Scott played at second-row in Wigan's 15–4 victory over Leeds in the 1982–83 John Player Trophy Final during the 1982–83 season at Elland Road, Leeds on Saturday 22 January 1983.

=== Return to Halifax ===
Scott was re-signed from Wigan by Halifax in July 1985 for a transfer fee of £10,000. He played in 32 games in all competitions in the 1985–86 season as Halifax pipped Wigan to the Championship by 1 point.

Scott played at second-row in Halifax's 19–18 victory over St. Helens in the 1987 Challenge Cup Final during the 1986–87 season at Wembley Stadium, London on Saturday 2 May 1987, and played as a substitute (replacing second-row Les Holliday) in the 12–32 defeat by Wigan in the 1988 Challenge Cup Final during the 1987–88 season at Wembley Stadium, London on Saturday 30 April 1988.

Scott played as a substitute, (replacing substitute Steve Smith) in Halifax's 12–24 defeat by Wigan in the 1989–90 Regal Trophy Final during the 1989–90 season at Headingley, Leeds on Saturday 13 January 1990.

== Honoured at Halifax ==
Scott is a Halifax Hall of Fame Inductee.
