= Syd Hynes =

English rugby league footballer (1944–2024)

Personal information
- Full name: Sydney Hynes
- Born: 31 July 1944 Hunslet, West Riding of Yorkshire, England
- Died: 11 December 2024 (aged 80) Perth, Western Australia, Australia

Playing information
- Position: Centre
Club
Years	Team	Pld	T	G	FG	P
1965–76	Leeds	366	158	156	32	850
Representative
Years	Team	Pld	T	G	FG	P
1968–73	Yorkshire	4	1	0	0	3
1969–70	England	4	5	0	0	15
1970–73	Great Britain	13	5	2	3	25

Coaching information
Club
Years	Team	Gms	W	D	L	W%
1975–81	Leeds

Sydney Hynes (31 July 1944 – 11 December 2024) was an English professional rugby league footballer who played in the 1960s and 1970s and coached rugby league in the 1970s and 1980s. He played club level rugby union for the sports club of the Leeds branch of National and Local Government Officers' Association (NALGO), as well as rugby league at representative level for Great Britain and England, and at club level for Leeds RLFC. Hynes played at centre and coached at club level for Leeds.

== Background ==
Hynes was born in Hunslet (in south Leeds), and was educated at Bewerley Street School. As of December 2016, Hynes lived in Willagee, Western Australia.

On 11 December 2024, it was announced that Hynes had died early that day from a short illness, in Perth, Western Australia. He was 80.

== Playing career ==
=== Club career ===
Hynes played at centre in Leeds' 11–10 victory over Wakefield Trinity in the 1968 Challenge Cup "Watersplash" Final during the 1967–68 season at Wembley Stadium, London on Saturday 11 May 1968, in front of a crowd of 87,100, played at centre and was captain in the 7–24 defeat by Leigh in the 1971 Challenge Cup Final during the 1970–71 at Wembley Stadium, London on Saturday 15 May 1971, in front of a crowd of 85,514, and became the first player to be sent off in a Challenge Cup Final after a headbutt on Leigh's Alex Murphy, and played at centre (replaced by substitute John Langley) in the 13–16 defeat by St. Helens in the 1972 Challenge Cup Final during the 1971–72 season at Wembley Stadium, London on Saturday 13 May 1972, in front of a crowd of 89,495.

Hynes played at centre in Leeds' 22-11 victory over Castleford in the 1968 Yorkshire Cup Final during the 1968–69 season at Belle Vue, Wakefield on Saturday 19 October 1968, played at centre scored 4-goals, and was man of the match winning the White Rose Trophy in the 23-7 victory over Featherstone Rovers in the 1970 Yorkshire Cup Final during the 1970–71 season at Odsal Stadium, Bradford on Saturday 21 November 1970, played at centre and scored a goal in the 36-9 victory over Dewsbury in the 1972 Yorkshire Cup Final during the 1972–73 season at Odsal Stadium, Bradford on Saturday 7 October 1972, played at centre and scored a goal in the 7-2 victory over Wakefield Trinity in the 1973 Yorkshire Cup Final during the 1973–74 season at Headingley, Leeds on Saturday 20 October 1973, played scrum-half, and was the coach in the 15-11 victory over Hull Kingston Rovers in the 1975 Yorkshire Cup Final during the 1975–76 season at Headingley, Leeds on Saturday 15 November 1975, played at centre and was the coach in the 16-12 victory over Featherstone Rovers in the 1976 Yorkshire Cup Final during the 1976–77 season at Headingley, Leeds on Saturday 16 October 1976.

Hynes played at centre and scored a try, and a goal in Leeds' 9-5 victory over St. Helens in the 1970 BBC2 Floodlit Trophy Final during the 1970–71 season at Headingley, Leeds on Tuesday 15 December 1970.

Hynes played at centre in Leeds' 12-7 victory over Salford in the 1972–73 Player's No.6 Trophy Final during the 1972–73 season at Fartown Ground, Huddersfield on Saturday 24 March 1973.

Hynes' Testimonial match at Leeds took place in 1974. His final game for the club took place in November 1976 in a Player's No.6 Trophy match against Castleford.

=== International honours ===
Syd Hynes won caps for England while at Leeds in 1969 against Wales and France, in 1970 against Wales, and France, and won caps for Great Britain while at Leeds in 1970 against Australia (2 matches), New Zealand (2 matches), New Zealand (sub), in the 1970 Rugby League World Cup against Australia, France, New Zealand and Australia, in 1971 against France, and in 1973 against Australia (3 matches).

== Coaching career ==
Hynes was the coach in Leeds' 16-7 victory over Widnes in the 1977 Challenge Cup Final during the 1976–77 season at Wembley Stadium, London on Saturday 7 May 1977, in front of a crowd of 80,871, and was the coach in the 14-12 victory over St. Helens in the 1978 Challenge Cup Final during the 1977–78 season at Wembley Stadium, London on Saturday 13 May 1978, in front of a crowd of 96,000.

Hynes was the coach in Leeds' 15-6 victory over Hull Kingston Rovers in the 1979 Yorkshire Cup Final during the 1979–80 season at Headingley, Leeds on Saturday 27 October 1979.

Before stepping down in April 1981, Leeds had won all seven cup finals they had played in while Hynes was coach.
