= Kevin Dick =

GB international rugby league footballer (born 1957)

Personal information
- Born: 27 October 1957 (age 68) Leeds, West Riding of Yorkshire, England

Playing information
- Position: Scrum-half
Club
Years	Team	Pld	T	G	FG	P
1975–86	Leeds	259	85	392	2	1054
1986–88	Hull FC	42	5	3	1	27
1988–89	Halifax	9	0	0	0	0
1990–91	Huddersfield	23	2	45	7	105
	Total	333	92	440	10	1186
Representative
Years	Team	Pld	T	G	FG	P
1980	Great Britain	2	0	0	0	0

Kevin Dick (born 27 October 1957), also known by the nickname of "Iron Teddy Bear", is an English former professional rugby league footballer who played in the 1970s, 1980s and 1990s. He played at representative level for Great Britain, and at club level for Leeds, Hull FC, Halifax and Huddersfield, as a goal-kicking scrum-half.

== Background ==
Kevin Dick is the son of the rugby league footballer who played in the 1950s for Leeds and Batley, Alec Dick. Kevin Dick's birth was registered in Leeds district, West Riding of Yorkshire, England. He has worked as a roofer.

== Playing career ==
=== International honours ===
Kevin Dick won caps for Great Britain while at Leeds in 1980 against New Zealand (2 matches).

=== Challenge Cup Final appearances ===
Kevin Dick played scrum-half, and scored a try, two goals, a penalty, and a drop goal in Leeds' 16–7 victory over Widnes in the 1977 Challenge Cup Final during the 1976–77 season at Wembley Stadium, London on Saturday 7 May 1977, in front of a crowd of 80,871, and appeared as a substitute in the 14–12 victory over St. Helens in the 1978 Challenge Cup Final during the 1977–78 season at Wembley Stadium, London on Saturday 13 May 1978, in front of a crowd of 96,000.

=== County Cup Final appearances ===
Kevin Dick played scrum-half, and scored three goals in Leeds' 15–6 victory over Halifax in the 1979 Yorkshire Cup Final during the 1979–80 season at Headingley, Leeds on Saturday 27 October 1979, and played scrum-half, was man of the match winning the White Rose Trophy, and scored two goals and a drop goal in the 8–7 victory over Hull Kingston Rovers in the 1980 Yorkshire Cup Final during the 1980–81 season at Fartown Ground, Huddersfield on Saturday 8 November 1980.

=== John Player Trophy/John Player Special Trophy Final appearances ===
Kevin Dick played scrum-half, and scored two goals in Leeds' 4–15 defeat by Wigan in the 1982–83 John Player Trophy Final during the 1982–83 season at Elland Road, Leeds on Saturday 22 January 1983, and played scrum-half, and scored a try in the 18–10 victory over Widnes in the 1983–84 John Player Special Trophy Final during the 1983–84 season at Central Park, Wigan on Saturday 14 January 1984.

=== Club career ===
Kevin Dick made his début for Leeds in 1975, and was transferred from Leeds to Hull F.C. in 1986 in exchange for Trevor Skerrett and Andy Gascoigne.
