= Keith Rayne =

GB & England international rugby league footballer and coach

Personal information
- Full name: Keith Rayne
- Born: 23 May 1956 (age 70)

Playing information
- Position: Prop, Second-row
Club
Years	Team	Pld	T	G	FG	P
1975–80	Wakefield Trinity	157	22	0	0	66
1980–87	Leeds	170	35	0	0	120
1987–90	Wakefield Trinity	68	11	0	0	44
1990–91	Batley	24	5	0	0	20
1991–92	Doncaster	9	0	0	0	0
	Total	428	73	0	0	250
Representative
Years	Team	Pld	T	G	FG	P
1980	England	2	1	0	0	3
1984	Great Britain	4	0	0	0	0

Coaching information
Club
Years	Team	Gms	W	D	L	W%
1990–91	Batley
- Relatives: Kevin Rayne (brother)

Keith Rayne (born 1956) is an English former professional rugby league footballer who played in the 1970s, 1980s and 1990s, and coached in the 1990s. He played at representative level for Great Britain and England, and at club level for Wakefield Trinity (two spells) (captain), Leeds and Doncaster, as a prop or second-row, and coached at club level for Batley.

== Playing career ==
=== Wakefield Trinity ===
Keith Rayne played at second-row, in Wakefield Trinity’s 3-12 defeat by Widnes in the 1978–79 Challenge Cup Final during the 1978–79 season at Wembley Stadium, London on Saturday 5 May 1979, in front of a crowd of a crowd of 94,218.

=== Leeds ===
In September 1980, Rayne was signed by Leeds for a fee of £35,000.

Keith Rayne played at prop, in Leeds' 18-10 victory over Widnes in the 1983–84 John Player Special Trophy Final during the 1983–84 season at Central Park, Wigan on Saturday 14 January 1984.

=== Return to Wakefield ===
In July 1987, Rayne was part of a six-player exchange deal; the Leeds players Mark Conway, Phil Fox, Andy Mason, and Keith Rayne, were transferred to Wakefield Trinity in exchange for John Lyons, and Gary Spencer. During his two spells at Wakefield Trinity, Rayne scored 22 three-point tries and 11 four-point tries.

=== International honours ===
Keith Rayne won caps for England while at Wakefield Trinity in 1980 against Wales, and France, and won caps for Great Britain while at Leeds in 1984 against France (2 matches), Australia, and Papua New Guinea.

== Coaching career ==
Rayne was the coach of Batley from May 1990 to April 1991, during the 1990–91 season.

== Personal life ==
Keith Rayne is the twin brother of the rugby league footballer, Kevin Rayne.
