= John Atkinson (rugby league) =

English rugby footballer and coach (1946–2017)

Personal information
- Full name: John Atkinson
- Born: 3 October 1946 Leeds, England
- Died: 23 December 2017 (aged 71)

Playing information

Rugby union
Club
Years	Team	Pld	T	G	FG	P
	Roundhay RUFC

Rugby league
- Position: Wing
Club
Years	Team	Pld	T	G	FG	P
1966–82	Leeds	518	340	0	0	1020
1982–83	Carlisle	20	4	0	0	13
	Total	538	344	0	0	1033
Representative
Years	Team	Pld	T	G	FG	P
1968–78	England	12	7	0	0	21
1968–80	Great Britain	26	12	0	0	36
1968–78	Yorkshire	15	10	0	0	30
1968–74	GB tour games	23+1	24	0	0	72
1975	England tour games	3	4	0	0	12

Coaching information
Club
Years	Team	Gms	W	D	L	W%
1983–85	Carlisle

John Atkinson (3 October 1946 – 23 December 2017) was an English rugby union and World Cup-winning professional rugby league footballer. He played in the 1960s, 1970s and 1980s, and was a coach in the 1980s.

Atkinson played club level rugby union (RU) for Roundhay RUFC, representative level rugby league (RL) for Great Britain and England, and at club level for Leeds and Carlisle as a wing.

Atkinson played in four Rugby League World Cups (1968, 1970, 1972 and 1975), scoring six tries in total.

== Background ==
John Atkinson was born Leeds, West Riding of Yorkshire, on 3 October 1946. After leaving school, he joined local rugby union club, Roundhay RUFC.

His grandfather George Broughton, and uncle George Broughton Jr., both played rugby league for Leeds.

== Rugby league career ==
=== Club career ===
Atkinson was signed by his hometown rugby league club Leeds in May 1965. He made his first team debut in March 1966, scoring two tries against York.

On 11 May 1968, he won his first trophy with the club with a 11–10 victory over Wakefield Trinity in the 1968 Challenge Cup final at Wembley Stadium. Atkinson was credited with scoring Leeds' only try during the match after being awarded a penalty try.

In the 1968–69 season, Atkinson won the first of seven Yorkshire Cup finals with the club, scoring a try in Leeds' 22–11 victory over Castleford in the 1968 Yorkshire Cup Final at Belle Vue, Wakefield on 19 October 1968. He also won his first league championship with the club, scoring the match-winning try in Leeds' 16–14 victory over Castleford in the Championship Final at Odsal, Bradford, on 24 May 1969.

In the 1970–71 season, Atkinson played and scored a try in the 23–7 victory over Featherstone Rovers in the 1970 Yorkshire Cup Final at Odsal, Bradford on 21 November 1970, played in Leeds' 9–5 victory over St Helens in the 1970 BBC2 Floodlit Trophy Final at Headingley, Leeds on 15 December 1970, and played in the 7–24 defeat by Leigh in the 1971 Challenge Cup Final at Wembley on 15 May 1971.

In the 1971–72 season, Atkinson played in the 13–16 defeat by St Helens in the 1972 Challenge Cup Final at Wembley on 13 May 1972, and scored a try in the 9–5 victory over St Helens in the 1972 Championship Final at Station Road, Swinton, on 20 May 1972.

In the 1972–73 season, Atkinson scored a try in the 36–9 victory over Dewsbury in the 1972 Yorkshire Cup Final at Odsal Stadium on 7 October 1972, and scored two tries in Leeds' 12–7 victory over Salford in the 1972–73 Player's No.6 Trophy Final at Fartown, Huddersfield on 24 March 1973.

In the 1973–74 season, Atkinson played in the 7–2 victory over Wakefield Trinity in the 1973 Yorkshire Cup Final at Headingley on 20 October 1973.

In the 1975–76 season, Atkinson played in the 15–11 victory over Hull Kingston Rovers in the 1975 Yorkshire Cup Final at Headingley on 15 November 1975. Atkinson's testimonial match at Leeds also took place in 1976. In March 1976, Atkinson suffered a broken leg in a league match against Wigan. During his recovery, he fractured his wrist when slipping on his crutches. The injuries kept him out of action for nine months. At the end of the 1976–77 season, he played and scored a try in the 16–7 victory over Widnes in the 1977 Challenge Cup Final at Wembley on 7 May 1977.

In October 1977, Atkinson announced his retirement from rugby league due to work commitments, but admitted his decision had also been influenced by his performance in a recent League Cup defeat against Wigan, in which he was beaten by his opposing winger Green Vigo several times throughout the match. He resumed playing for Leeds three months later. At the end of the 1977–78 season, Atkinson played and scored a try in the 14–12 victory over St Helens in the 1978 Challenge Cup Final at Wembley on 13 May 1978.

In the 1979–80 season, Atkinson played in the 15–6 victory over Halifax in the 1979 Yorkshire Cup Final at Headingley on 27 October 1979.

In the 1980–81 season, Atkinson played in the 8–7 victory over Hull Kingston Rovers in the 1980 Yorkshire Cup Final at Fartown on 8 November 1980.

Atkinson left Leeds to join Carlisle in 1982. He scored 340 tries for Leeds, the second highest career total in the club's history.

=== Representative career ===
Atkinson was capped 26 times for Great Britain between 1968 and 1980. He was selected for three World Cups for Great Britain (1968, 1970 and 1972), and was part of the World Cup-winning team that played against Australia in the 1972 Rugby League World Cup final. He was also selected for the 1970 and 1974 Lions tours. He was also offered a place on the 1979 Lions tour, but declined the selection.

Atkinson was also capped 12 times for England between 1968 and 1978. He was selected for a fourth World Cup in 1975.

=== Coaching career ===
Atkinson became player-coach at Carlisle in February 1983, replacing Mick Morgan. He resigned in February 1986.

== Outside rugby league ==
Atkinson worked as a police officer during his playing career. After retiring from rugby, he became a detective sergeant and later worked as a security manager.

In March 2017, it was revealed that Atkinson was suffering from dementia and was being cared for by his wife. He died on 23 December 2017, aged 71.

== Honours ==
Club

- RFL Championship
  - Winners (2): 1968–69, 1971–72
- Challenge Cup
  - Winners (3): 1967–68, 1976–77, 1977–78
- RFL Premiership
  - Winners (2): 1974–75, 1978–79
- BBC2 Floodlit Trophy
  - Winners (1): 1970–71
- Players No. 6 Trophy
  - Winners (1): 1972–73
- RFL Yorkshire Cup
  - Winners (7): 1968–69, 1970–71, 1972–73, 1973–74, 1975–76, 1979–80, 1980–81

Representative

- Rugby League World Cup
  - Winners (1): 1972

Individual

- Open Rugby World XIII: 1978, Oct 1979
- Leeds Rugby Hall of Fame Inductee: 2019
