= 1976–77 Challenge Cup =

Rugby league competition

- Duration: 6 Rounds
- Number of teams: 34
- Highest attendance: 80,871
- Broadcast partners: BBC
- Winners: Leeds
- Runners-up: Widnes
- Lance Todd Trophy: Steve Pitchford

The 1976–77 Challenge Cup was the 76th staging of rugby league's oldest knockout competition, the Challenge Cup. The final was contested by Leeds and Widnes at Wembley.

Leeds beat Widnes 16-7 at Wembley in front of a crowd of 80,871.

The winner of the Lance Todd Trophy was the Leeds prop, Steve Pitchford.

This was Leeds’ tenth Cup final win in fourteen Final appearances.

== First round ==
Date	Team one	Team two	Score
11 Feb	Beecroft	Swinton	2-10
11 Feb	Salford	Huddersfield	25-2
12 Feb	Leeds	Batley	40-6
12 Feb	Warrington	St Helens	12-13
13 Feb	Blackpool	Bradford Northern	8-38
13 Feb	Bramley	Widnes	6-11
13 Feb	Castleford	New Hunslet	27-6
13 Feb	Hull FC	Doncaster	34-11
13 Feb	Hull Kingston Rovers	Keighley	20-10
13 Feb	Huyton	Workington Town	3-10
13 Feb	Oldham	Dewsbury	8-15
13 Feb	Pilkington Recs	Wigan	4-10
13 Feb	Rochdale Hornets	Leigh	23-8
13 Feb	Wakefield Trinity	Halifax	12-3
13 Feb	Whitehaven	Featherstone Rovers	5-6
26 Feb	York	Barrow	9-15

== Second round ==
Date	Team one	Team two	Score
26 Feb	Hull Kingston Rovers	Hull FC	12-9
26 Feb	Leeds	Barrow	21-11
27 Feb	Bradford Northern	Featherstone Rovers	12-7
27 Feb	Dewsbury	Wakefield Trinity	3-0
27 Feb	Rochdale Hornets	Castleford	2-10
27 Feb	Widnes	Swinton	36-5
27 Feb	Wigan	St Helens	4-9
27 Feb	Workington Town	Salford	13-4

== Quarter-finals ==
Date	Team one	Team two	Score
12 Mar	Castleford	Hull Kingston Rovers	15-25
13 Mar	Dewsbury	St Helens	8-11
13 Mar	Widnes	Bradford Northern	19-5
13 Mar	Workington Town	Leeds	2-8

== Semi-finals ==
Date	Team one	Team two	Score
26 Mar	St Helens	Leeds	2-7
02 Apr	Hull Kingston Rovers	Widnes	5-14

== Final ==
7 May 1977

Leeds	16 – 7	Widnes
Try: Atkinson, Dyl, Dick; Goal: Dick (3); Drop goal: Dick	Report	Try: Aspey; Goal: Dutton (2)

Wembley, London
Attendance: 80,871
Referee: J. V. Moss (Manchester)
Player of the Match: Steve Pitchford

FB	1	Bryan Murrell
RW	2	Alan Smith	(substituted off) 77'
RC	3	Neil Hague
LC	4	Les Dyl
LW	5	John Atkinson
SO	6	John Holmes
SH	7	Kevin Dick
PR	8	Mick Harrison
HK	9	David Ward (c)
PR	10	Steve Pitchford
SR	11	Graham Eccles
SR	12	Phil Cookson
LF	13	Stan Fearnley	(substituted off) 71'
Substitutions:
IC	14	David Smith	(substituted in) 77'
IC	15	Roy Dickinson	(substituted in) 71'
Coach:
Syd Hynes

FB	1	Ray Dutton
RW	2	Stuart Wright
RC	3	Mal Aspey
LC	4	David Eckersley
LW	5	Dennis O'Neill
SO	6	Eric Hughes
SH	7	Reg Bowden (c)
PR	8	Bill Ramsey
HK	9	Keith Elwell
PR	10	Jim Mills
SR	11	Alan Dearden	(substituted off) 64'
SR	12	Mick Adams
LF	13	Doug Laughton
Substitutions:
IC	14	Mick George
IC	15	John Foran	(substituted in) 64'
Coach:
Frank Myler
