= Kevin Rayne =

GB international rugby league footballer

Personal information
- Full name: Kevin Rayne
- Born: 23 May 1956 (age 69)

Playing information
- Position: Prop, Second-row
Club
Years	Team	Pld	T	G	FG	P
1975–81	Wakefield Trinity	115	18	0	0	54
1981–88	Leeds	189	24	0	0	88
1988–92	Doncaster	96	22	0	0	88
1992–93	Bramley
	Total	400	64	0	0	230
Representative
Years	Team	Pld	T	G	FG	P
1980	Yorkshire	2
1986	Great Britain	1	0	0	0	0
- Relatives: Keith Rayne (brother)

Kevin Rayne (born 23 May 1956) is an English former professional rugby league footballer who played in the 1970s, 1980s and 1990s. He played at representative level for Great Britain and Yorkshire, and at club level for Wakefield Trinity, Leeds and Doncaster, as a prop, or second-row.

== Playing career ==
=== Wakefield Trinity ===
Kevin Rayne made his début for Wakefield Trinity in the 30–13 victory over Huddersfield at Fartown Ground, Huddersfield on Saturday 4 October 1975.

Kevin Rayne was an unused interchange/substitute in Wakefield Trinity's 3–12 defeat by Widnes in the 1978–79 Challenge Cup Final during the 1978–79 season at Wembley Stadium, London on Saturday 5 May 1979, in front of a crowd of a crowd of 94,218.

=== Leeds ===
In December 1981, Rayne was signed by Leeds for a club record fee of £41,500.

Kevin Rayne played at prop, in Leeds' 18–10 victory over Widnes in the 1983–84 John Player Special Trophy Final during the 1983–84 season at Central Park, Wigan on Saturday 14 January 1984, and played at prop (replaced by interchange/substitute John Fairbank) in the 14–15 defeat by St Helens in the 1987–88 John Player Special Trophy Final during the 1987–88 season at Central Park, Wigan on Saturday 9 January 1988.

=== Representative honours ===
Rayne played twice for Yorkshire while at Wakefield Trinity in the County Championship during the 1980–81 season.

Rayne was capped once for Great Britain, playing at second-row, in Great Britain's 24–10 victory over France in the Test match at Central Park, Wigan on Saturday 1 March 1986.

== Personal life ==
Kevin Rayne is the twin brother of the rugby league footballer, Keith Rayne.
