= Christopher Sanderson =

English rugby league footballer

Chris Sanderson

Personal information
- Full name: Christopher Sanderson
- Born: 27 July 1954 York, England
- Died: 24 April 1977 (aged 22) Salford, England

Playing information
- Position: Stand-off, Scrum-half
Club
Years	Team	Pld	T	G	FG	P
1971–77	Leeds	90	21	0	0	63

Christopher Sanderson (27 July 1954 – 24 April 1977) was an English professional rugby league footballer who played in the 1970s. He played at club level for York Juniors and Leeds, as a stand-off or scrum-half.

== Playing career ==
=== County Cup Final appearances ===
Chris Sanderson was a substitute in Leeds' 15-11 victory over Hull Kingston Rovers in the 1975 Yorkshire Cup Final at Headingley Stadium on Saturday 15 November 1975, and was a substitute in the 16-12 victory over Featherstone Rovers in the 1976 Yorkshire Cup Final at Headingley Stadium on Saturday 16 October 1976.

=== Club career ===
Chris Sanderson's Leeds début came against Halifax on 8 September 1971, and he played in the Challenge Cup matches during the 1974–75 season against Bradford Northern and Salford, and the semi-final defeat by Warrington.

== Death ==
During Leeds' match (with the score at 5-2 to Leeds, subsequently abandoned, and not replayed) against Salford at the Willows on Sunday 24 April 1977, Chris Sanderson collapsed following a tackle in the eighth minute. He died later that day at a nearby hospital.

=== Testimonial match ===
Leeds' 1976–77 Challenge Cup victory was dedicated to Chris Sanderson. Chris Sanderson's testimonial match at Leeds on the Thursday 12 May 1977 was played between Leeds and Great Britain. It was attended by 11,000 people and raised £7,000 for his family.

== See also ==
- List of rugby league players who died during matches
