= David Ward (rugby league) =

Pro RL coach and former GB & England international rugby league footballer (born 1953)

Personal information
- Born: 16 December 1953 (age 72) Morley, England

Playing information
- Position: Hooker
Club
Years	Team	Pld	T	G	FG	P
1971–86	Leeds	482	40	2	15	143
	Workington Town
	Total	482	40	2	15	143
Representative
Years	Team	Pld	T	G	FG	P
1976	Great Britain U-24	2	0	0	0	0
1977–81	England	6	0	0	0	0
1977–82	Great Britain	12	0	0	0	0
1977–82	Yorkshire	6	2	0	0	6

Coaching information
Club
Years	Team	Gms	W	D	L	W%
1986–87	Hunslet
1989–90	Hunslet
1990–91	Leeds
1991–94	Batley
1994–96	Featherstone Rovers
1999–00	Batley Bulldogs
2001	Batley Bulldogs	0	0	0	0
	Total	0	0	0	0

David J. Ward (born 16 December 1953) is an English former rugby league footballer who played in the 1970s and 1980s, and coached in the 1980s and 1990s. He played at representative level for Great Britain and England, and at club level for Leeds, as a hooker, and coached at club level for Hunslet (two spells), Leeds, Batley (two spells), and Featherstone Rovers. He was the first winner of Rugby League’s prestigious Man of Steel award in 1977. He won a total of 12 Great Britain caps.

== Background ==
Ward was born in Morley, West Riding of Yorkshire, England.

== Playing career ==
Ward played hooker in Leeds' 16–7 victory over Widnes in the 1977 Challenge Cup Final during the 1976–77 season at Wembley Stadium, London on Saturday 7 May 1977, and won the inaugural Man of Steel Award that season.

Ward played hooker, and scored 2-drop goals in the 14–12 victory over St. Helens in the 1978 Challenge Cup Final during the 1977–78 season at Wembley Stadium, London on Saturday 13 May 1978, in front of a crowd of 96,000, this was possibly the greatest moment of his playing career, he gave a commanding performance marshalling the Leeds team, and kicked two late drop goals to complete what was then a record comeback. Ward's Testimonial match at Leeds took place in 1982. In addition to the above Test matches, Ward played hooker in Great Britain’s 7–8 defeat by France in the friendly at Stadio Pier Luigi Penzo, Venice on Saturday 31 July 1982.

=== County Cup Final appearances ===
Ward played hooker in Leeds' 36–9 victory over Dewsbury in the 1972 Yorkshire Cup Final during the 1972–73 season at Odsal Stadium, Bradford on Saturday 7 October 1972, played hooker in the 7–2 victory over Wakefield Trinity in the 1973 Yorkshire Cup Final during the 1973–74 season at Headingley, Leeds on Saturday 20 October 1973, played hooker in the 16–12 victory over Featherstone Rovers in the 1976 Yorkshire Cup Final during the 1976–77 season at Headingley, Leeds on Saturday 16 October 1976, played hooker in the 15–6 victory over Halifax in the 1979 Yorkshire Cup Final during the 1979–80 season at Headingley, Leeds on Saturday 27 October 1979, and played hooker in the 8–7 victory over Hull Kingston Rovers in the 1980 Yorkshire Cup Final during the 1980–81 season at Fartown Ground, Huddersfield on Saturday 8 November 1980

=== Player's No.6/John Player/John Player Special Trophy Final appearances ===
Ward came on as a substitute (replacing prop Terry Clawson) in Leeds' 12–7 victory over Salford in the 1972–73 Player's No.6 Trophy Final during the 1972–73 season at Fartown Ground, Huddersfield on Saturday 24 March 1973, played hooker in the 4–15 defeat by Wigan in the 1982–83 John Player Trophy Final during the 1982–83 season at Elland Road, Leeds on Saturday 22 January 1983, and played hooker (replaced by substitute Kevin Squire) in the 18–10 victory over Widnes in the 1983–84 John Player Special Trophy Final during the 1983–84 season at Central Park, Wigan on Saturday 14 January 1984.

== Coaching career ==
One of the more notable signings of his coaching career was when Ward brought John Gallagher to Leeds, converting the player from rugby union, but Ward was ultimately unsuccessful at Leeds, despite being in charge of one of only two full-time squads in the league at the time, the other being Wigan.

Ward coached at Featherstone Rovers between 1994 and 1997.

== Post playing ==
He is the father of the rugby league footballer; Danny Ward.

Ward was one of the inaugural inductees to the Leeds Hall of Fame in 2017.
