= 1972–73 Northern Rugby Football League season =

- League: Championship
- Teams: 30
- Champions: Dewsbury
- League Leaders: Warrington
- Runners-up: Leeds
- Top point-scorer(s): David Watkins 493
- Top try-scorer(s): John Atkinson 39

League reorganisation
- Created Second Division: York; Halifax; Batley; Keighley; Swinton; Workington Town; Bradford Northern; Huddersfield; Hull; Barrow; Doncaster; Hunslet; Blackpool Borough; Huyton

The 1972–73 Northern Rugby Football League season was the 78th season of rugby league football played in England. It would also be the last season whereby the British championship was decided by a play-off system until Super League III in 1998. Dewsbury were crowned champions after defeating Leeds in the Final. The 1972–73 season was also punctuated by the 1972 Rugby League World Cup which was played in France in October and November. At the end of this season the league re-formed into two divisions. The top 16 in the championship would form Division 1 and the bottom 14 Division 2.

== Rule changes ==
Number of tackles:

- The four-tackle rule was altered and a new limit of six tackles was introduced. The four-tackle rules had been blamed for making the game seem "disjointed". A scrum was formed at the end of a completed set of the tackles.

Timekeeping:

- Timekeepers were given responsibility, rather than referees, for controlling time in matches. They signalled using a hooter siren system.

== Season summary ==
Salford's David Watkins set the record for most goals (including drop goals) in a season with 221. Also, on 19 August 1972, Watkins started his record scoring streak which lasted until 25 April 1974. He totalled 929 points from 41 tries and 403 goals in 92 consecutive matches for one club.

1972-73 also saw the Wigan club celebrate its centenary, having been formed as Wigan F.C. on 21 November 1872. During the season they played a special Centenary Celebration match against an "Australians" side.

- Challenge Cup Winners: Featherstone Rovers (33-14 v Bradford Northern)
- Player's No.6 Trophy Winners: Leeds (12-7 v Salford at Fartown Ground, Huddersfield)
- BBC2 Floodlit Trophy Winners: Leigh (5-0 v Widnes)

Hunslet disbanded at the end of the season, reforming as New Hunslet for the 1973–74 season.

== Championship ==
=== Final standings ===
Pos	Team	Pld	W	D	L	PF	PA	PAv	Pts	Qualification or relegation
1	Warrington (L)	34	27	2	5	816	400	2.040	56	Qualification for the Championship play-offs
2	Featherstone Rovers	34	27	0	7	768	436	1.761	54	Qualification for the Championship play-offs
3	Leeds	34	26	1	7	810	324	2.500	53	Qualification for the Championship play-offs
4	St Helens	34	24	2	8	623	298	2.091	50	Qualification for the Championship play-offs
5	Wakefield Trinity	34	25	0	9	814	398	2.045	50	Qualification for the Championship play-offs
6	Salford	34	25	0	9	723	383	1.888	50	Qualification for the Championship play-offs
7	Castleford	34	25	0	9	704	404	1.743	50	Qualification for the Championship play-offs
8	Dewsbury	34	23	0	11	534	354	1.508	46	Qualification for the Championship play-offs
9	Oldham	34	20	2	12	604	349	1.731	42	Qualification for the Championship play-offs
10	Hull Kingston Rovers	34	20	1	13	731	522	1.400	41	Qualification for the Championship play-offs
11	Rochdale Hornets	34	20	1	13	438	426	1.028	41	Qualification for the Championship play-offs
12	Widnes	34	19	0	15	592	458	1.293	38	Qualification for the Championship play-offs
13	Leigh	34	18	2	14	479	390	1.228	38	Qualification for the Championship play-offs
14	Bramley	34	18	1	15	452	465	0.972	37	Qualification for the Championship play-offs
15	Whitehaven	34	18	1	15	408	512	0.797	37	Qualification for the Championship play-offs
16	Wigan	34	17	1	16	577	491	1.175	35	Qualification for the Championship play-offs
17	York	34	17	1	16	586	575	1.019	35	Relegation to Second Division
18	Halifax	34	17	0	17	543	562	0.966	34	Relegation to Second Division
19	Batley	34	15	0	19	537	600	0.895	30	Relegation to Second Division
20	Keighley	34	15	0	19	451	505	0.893	30	Relegation to Second Division
21	Swinton	34	14	1	19	441	458	0.963	29	Relegation to Second Division
22	Workington Town	34	12	1	21	444	464	0.957	25	Relegation to Second Division
23	Bradford Northern	34	12	0	22	582	685	0.850	24	Relegation to Second Division
24	Huddersfield	34	10	2	22	465	598	0.778	22	Relegation to Second Division
25	Hull	34	11	0	23	494	693	0.713	22	Relegation to Second Division
26	Barrow	34	7	0	27	351	775	0.453	14	Relegation to Second Division
27	Doncaster	34	6	0	28	298	911	0.327	12	Relegation to Second Division
28	Hunslet	34	5	0	29	371	916	0.405	10	Relegation to Second Division
29	Blackpool Borough	34	4	0	30	324	972	0.333	8	Relegation to Second Division
30	Huyton	34	3	1	30	243	879	0.276	7	Relegation to Second Division

Rules for classification: 1) Points; 2) Points average; 3) Number of points scored;
(L) Won League Leader's Trophy

=== Play-offs ===
First round
3	Leeds	45
14	Bramley	8
7	Castleford	24
10	Hull Kingston Rovers	12
4	St Helens	29
13	Leigh	14
5	Wakefield Trinity	33
12	Widnes	6
1	Warrington	30
16	Wigan	15
6	Salford	10
11	Rochdale Hornets	14
2	Featherstone Rovers	14
15	Whitehaven	4
8	Dewsbury	29
9	Oldham	14

Quarter-finals
Leeds	30
Castleford	5
St Helens	28
Wakefield Trinity	0
Warrington	16
Rochdale Hornets	9
Featherstone Rovers	7
Dewsbury	26

Semi-finals
Leeds	7
St Helens	2
Warrington	7
Dewsbury	12

Championship final
Leeds	13
Dewsbury	22

=== Final ===
The 1973 Final was to be the last time a play-off system would be used to determine the British champions until 1998's Super League season. The match was played on 19 May 1973 at Bradford's Odsal Stadium between the previous season's champions, Leeds and first-time finalists, Dewsbury. Dewsbury had suffered a county cup record defeat 36–9 at the hands of Leeds in the Yorkshire County Cup Final earlier in the season. Also Leeds had finished 3rd on the ladder and Dewsbury 8th. However, Dewsbury opened up a 12–4 lead by the interval with tries by the hooker Mike Stephenson and Allan Agar and two goals and a drop-goal from the boot of centre Nigel Stephenson. Leeds captain Alan Hardisty was sent off for the first time in his career for a high tackle on John Bates.

A second try from Mike Stephenson on 44 minutes extended Dewsbury's lead and though Leeds hit back with tries by Graham Eccles, Phil Cookson and Les Dyl, it was not to be with Nigel Stephenson converting his own try to complete a resounding 22-13 success. Leading journalist Jack Winstanley wrote at the time: "Dewsbury's win sprung from a superb team effort that paid ample tribute to the coaching and inspiration of (coach) Tommy Smales. They bewildered a jaded Leeds outfit with a series of scissors moves and dummy passes that might have looked grossly over-elaborate had they not worked to such perfection." The Harry Sunderland Trophy for man-of-the-match went to Mike Stephenson. Greg Ashcroft, Jeff Grayshon and Alan Bates also played in the champion Dewsbury side.

19 May 1973

Dewsbury	22 – 13	Leeds
Tries: M. Stephenson (2), N. Stephenson, Agar; Goals: N. Stephenson (5)		Tries: Dyl, Cookson, Eccles; Goals: Clawson, Hynes

Odsal Stadium, Bradford
Attendance: 18,889
Referee: Harry Hunt (Prestbury)
Player of the Match: Mike Stephenson

Dewsbury	Number	Leeds
	Teams	
Adrian Rushton	1	John Holmes
Greg Ashcroft	2	Alan Smith
John Clarke	3	Syd Hynes
Nigel Stephenson	4	Les Dyl
Terry Day	5	John Atkinson
Allan Agar	6	Alan Hardisty
Alan Bates	7	Keith Hepworth
Harry Beverley	8	Terry Clawson
Mike Stephenson	9	Tony Fisher
Trevor Lowe	10	Geoff Clarkson
Jeff Grayshon	11	Phil Cookson
John Bates	12	Graham Eccles
Joe Whittington	13	Bob Haigh
	Subs	
Steve Lee	14	David Ward (for Fisher)
Brian Taylor (for Beverley)	15	John Langley (for Clarkson)
Tommy Smales	Coach	Derek Turner

== Challenge Cup ==
The 1973 Challenge Cup Final was won by Featherstone Rovers who beat Bradford Northern 33–14 at Wembley Saturday 12 May 1973 before a crowd of 72,395. Featherstone Rovers' Great Britain scrum half-back, Steve Nash put in a man-of-the-match performance to win the Lance Todd Trophy. Cyril Kellett scored 8-conversions for Featherstone Rovers, the most in a Challenge Cup Final (equalled by Iestyn Harris in 1999).

== Players No.6 Trophy ==
This was the second season of the League Cup, which was known as the Players No.6 Trophy for sponsorship reasons. Leeds won the trophy by beating Salford 12-7 in the final. The match was played at Fartown, Huddersfield. The attendance was 10,102 and receipts were £4563.

== County cups ==
Salford beat Swinton 25–11 to win the Lancashire Cup, and Leeds beat Dewsbury 36–9 to win the Yorkshire Cup.

== Sources ==
- All Time Records at rlhalloffame.org.uk
- 1972-73 Rugby Football League season at wigan.rlfans.com
- Pain of defeat serves Dewsbury well to prevent any repeat performance - article at yorkshirepost.co.uk
- Playing at Smales pace sank champions - article at yorkshirepost.co.uk
