= David Heron (rugby league) =

GB international rugby league footballer

Personal information
- Full name: David Heron
- Born: 1 March 1958 (age 67)

Playing information
- Position: Second-row, Loose forward
Club
| Years | Team | Pld | T | G | FG | P |
|---|---|---|---|---|---|---|
| 1977–92 | Leeds | 401 | 94 | 0 | 0 | 316 |
| 1992–95 | Bradford Northern | 95 | 7 | 0 | 0 | 28 |
| 1995–96 | Batley | 32 | 8 | 0 | 0 | 32 |
| 1997 | Bramley | 11 | 1 | 0 | 0 | 4 |
| | Total | 539 | 110 | 0 | 0 | 380 |
Representative
| Years | Team | Pld | T | G | FG | P |
| 1980–88 | Yorkshire | 6 | 1 | 0 | 0 | 4 |
| 1982 | Great Britain | 2 | 0 | 0 | 0 | 0 |

David Heron (born 1 March 1958) is an English former professional rugby league footballer who played in the 1970s, 1980s and 1990s. He played at representative level for Great Britain and Yorkshire, and at club level for Leeds, Bradford Northern and Batley, as a second-row, or loose forward.

== Playing career ==
=== Club career ===
David Heron played at second-row (replaced by substitute Bryan Adams) in Leeds' 15–6 victory over Halifax in the 1979 Yorkshire Cup Final during the 1979–80 season at Headingley, Leeds on Saturday 27 October 1979, played loose forward in the 8–7 victory over Hull Kingston Rovers in the 1980 Yorkshire Cup Final during the 1980–81 season at Fartown Ground, Huddersfield on Saturday 8 November 1980, and played loose forward in the 33–12 victory over Castleford in the 1988 Yorkshire Cup Final during the 1988–89 season at Elland Road, Leeds on Sunday 16 October 1988.

Heron played loose forward in Leeds' 4–15 defeat by Wigan in the 1982–83 John Player Trophy Final during the 1982–83 season at Elland Road, Leeds on Saturday 22 January 1983, played loose forward in the 14–15 defeat by St. Helens in the 1987–88 John Player Special Trophy Final during the 1987–88 season at Central Park, Wigan on Saturday 9 January 1988.

Dave Heron's Testimonial match at Leeds took place in 1987.

He left Leeds in 1992 and joined Bradford Northern. He played loose forward in Bradford Northern's 8–15 defeat by Wigan in the 1992–93 Regal Trophy Final during the 1992–93 season at Elland Road, Leeds on Saturday 23 January 1993.

=== Representative honours ===
Dave Heron won caps for Great Britain while at Leeds in 1982 against Australia (sub), and Australia.
