= Ron Campbell (referee) =

English rugby league referee (1936–2026)

Personal information
- Born: 8 March 1936 Widnes, England
- Died: 17 April 2026 (aged 90)

Playing information
- Position: Second-row
Club
Years	Team	Pld	T	G	FG	P
	Liverpool City

Refereeing information
Years	Competition	Apps
1974–1986	Rugby Football League Championship
1978–1985	Internationals

Ron Campbell (8 March 1936 – 17 April 2026) was an English rugby league referee and player. As a player, he was a second-row forward for Liverpool City. After finishing his playing career, he became a referee. He took charge of the 1985 Challenge Cup final, and refereed several international matches throughout the late 1970s and early 1980s.

== Biography ==
Campbell was born in Widnes, Cheshire on 8 March 1936. He began playing rugby league as a second-row forward for amateur club, Widnes St Maries. After an unsuccessful trial with Salford, he later played professionally for Liverpool City.

When he ended his playing career in 1969, Campbell turned to refereeing. He was added to the Rugby Football League's Grade One referee's list during the 1974–75 season. He took charge of his first international match in January 1978. Later that year, he officiated the first Test between Great Britain and Australia of the 1978 Kangaroo Tour.

In July 1982, Campbell was diagnosed with cancer, and missed most of the following season while receiving treatment. He made a full recovery, and went on to be appointed as referee of the 1985 Challenge Cup final. Campbell was praised for his officiating of the match, which is often regarded as the greatest final in Challenge Cup history.

Throughout his career, he refereed over 250 games, as well as eight Test matches, before retiring in 1986, aged 50.

Campbell died in April 2026, at the age of 90.
