= Alan Smith (rugby league, born 1944) =

Great Britain and England international rugby league footballer

Personal information
- Full name: Montagu(e) Alan Smith
- Born: 8 February 1944 (age 81); Overton, Wakefield, England

Playing information
- Position: Wing
Club
Years	Team	Pld	T	G	FG	P
1962–83	Leeds	469	283	0	0	849
Representative
Years	Team	Pld	T	G	FG	P
1968–70	England	3	4	0	0	12
1970–73	Great Britain	10	3	0	0	9

Montagu(e) Alan Smith (born 8 February 1944) is an English former professional rugby league footballer who played in the 1960s, 1970s and 1980s. He played at representative level for Great Britain and England, and at club level for Leeds, as a wing.

== Background ==
Alan Smith was born in Overton, Wakefield, West Riding of Yorkshire, and as a child he lived on a farm in the village.

== Playing career ==
=== International honours ===
Alan Smith won caps for England while at Leeds in 1968 against Wales, in 1970 against Wales, and France, in the 1975 Rugby League World Cup against Australia, and won caps for Great Britain while at Leeds in 1970 against Australia (2 matches), New Zealand (3 matches), in the 1970 Rugby League World Cup against Australia (2 matches), in 1971 against France (2 matches), and in 1973 against Australia.

=== Challenge Cup Final appearances ===
Alan Smith played on the wing in Leeds' 11–10 victory over Wakefield Trinity in the 1968 Challenge Cup "Watersplash" Final during the 1967–68 season at Wembley Stadium, London on Saturday 11 May 1968, in front of a crowd of 87,100, played on the wing in the 13–16 defeat by St. Helens in the 1972 Challenge Cup Final during the 1971–72 season at Wembley Stadium on Saturday 13 May 1972, and played on the wing in the 16–7 victory over Widnes in the 1977 Challenge Cup Final during the 1976–77 season at Wembley Stadium on Saturday 7 May 1977, in front of a crowd of 80,871.

=== County Cup Final appearances ===
Alan Smith played on the wing and scored a try in Leeds' 22–11 victory over Castleford in the 1968 Yorkshire Cup Final during the 1968–69 season at Belle Vue, Wakefield on Saturday 19 October 1968, played on the wing, and scored 2 tries in the 23–7 victory over Featherstone Rovers in the 1970 Yorkshire Cup Final during the 1970–71 season at Odsal Stadium, Bradford on Saturday 21 November 1970, played on the wing in the 36–9 victory over Dewsbury in the 1972 Yorkshire Cup Final during the 1972–73 season at Odsal Stadium on Saturday 7 October 1972, played on the wing in the 15–11 victory over Hull Kingston Rovers in the 1975 Yorkshire Cup Final during the 1975–76 season at Headingley, Leeds on Saturday 15 November 1975, played on the wing, scored 2 tries, and was man of the match winning the White Rose Trophy in the 15–6 victory over Halifax in the 1979 Yorkshire Cup Final during the 1979–80 season at Headingley on Saturday 27 October 1979, and played on the wing, and scored a try in the 8–7 victory over Hull Kingston Rovers in the 1980 Yorkshire Cup Final during the 1980–81 season at Fartown Ground, Huddersfield on Saturday 8 November 1980. The record for the most tries in a Yorkshire Cup Final is 4 tries, and is jointly held by; Stan Moorhouse, Alan Smith, and Stanley Smith.

=== BBC2 Floodlit Trophy Final appearances ===
Alan Smith played on the wing in Leeds' 9–5 victory over St. Helens in the 1970 BBC2 Floodlit Trophy Final during the 1970–71 season at Headingley on Tuesday 15 December 1970.

=== Player's No.6 Trophy Final appearances ===
Alan Smith played on the wing in Leeds' 12–7 victory over Salford in the 1972–73 Player's No.6 Trophy Final during the 1972–73 season at Fartown Ground, Huddersfield on Saturday 24 March 1973.
