= Les Dyl =

English rugby league footballer (1952–2022)

Personal information
- Full name: Leslie P. Dyl
- Born: 1 December 1952 Castleford, West Yorkshire, England
- Died: 22 May 2022 (aged 69)

Playing information
- Position: Centre, Wing
Club
| Years | Team | Pld | T | G | FG | P |
|---|---|---|---|---|---|---|
| 1970–85 | Leeds | 434 | 193 | 11 | 1 | 604 |
| 1988–89 | Bramley | 23 | 4 | 0 | 0 | 16 |
| | Total | 457 | 197 | 11 | 1 | 620 |
Representative
| Years | Team | Pld | T | G | FG | P |
| 1975–81 | England | 12+1 | 2 | 0 | 0 | 6 |
| 1974–82 | Great Britain | 11 | 4 | 0 | 0 | 12 |
| 1974 | GB tour games | 12 | 11 | 0 | 0 | 33 |
| 1972–82 | Yorkshire | 6+2 | 1 | 0 | 0 | 3 |
| 1975 | England tour games | 6 | 8 | 0 | 0 | 24 |

Leslie P. Dyl (1 December 1952 – 22 May 2022) was an English professional rugby league footballer who played in the 1970s and 1980s. He played at representative level for Great Britain and England, and at club level for Leeds and Bramley, as a wing or centre.

== Playing career ==
=== Challenge Cup Final appearances ===
Dyl played as an interchange/substitute (replacing centre Ronnie Cowan) in Leeds' 7–24 defeat by Leigh in the 1971 Challenge Cup Final at Wembley Stadium, London on 15 May 1971 in front of a crowd of 85,514; played left-centre in the 13–16 defeat by St. Helens in the 1972 Challenge Cup Final at Wembley Stadium on 13 May 1972 in front of a crowd of 89,495; played left-centre and scored a try in the 16–7 victory over Widnes in the 1977 Challenge Cup Final at Wembley on 7 May 1977 in front of a crowd of 80,871; and played left-centre in the 14–12 victory over St. Helens in the 1978 Challenge Cup Final at Wembley on 13 May 1978 in front of a crowd of 96,000.

=== County Cup Final appearances ===
Dyl played left-centre in Leeds' 36–9 victory over Dewsbury in the 1972 Yorkshire Cup Final at Odsal Stadium, Bradford on 7 October 1972, played left-centre and scored 2 tries in the 7–2 victory over Wakefield Trinity in the 1973 Yorkshire Cup Final at Headingley Stadium in Leeds on 20 October 1973; played left-centre and scored a try in the 15–11 victory over Hull Kingston Rovers in the 1975 Yorkshire Cup Final during the 1975–76 season at Headingly on 15 November 1975; played left-centre, scored 2 tries, and was man of the match winning the White Rose Trophy in the 16–12 victory over Featherstone Rovers in the 1976 Yorkshire Cup Final at Headingly on 16 October 1976; and played left-centre in the 15–6 victory over Halifax in the 1979 Yorkshire Cup Final during the 1979–80 season at Headingly on 27 October 1979.

=== Player's No.6/John Player Trophy Final appearances ===
Dyl played left-centre in Leeds' 12–7 victory over Salford in the 1972–73 Player's No.6 Trophy Final at Fartown Ground, Huddersfield on 24 March 1973, and played left-centre in the 4–15 defeat by Wigan in the 1982–83 John Player Trophy Final at Elland Road in Leeds on 22 January 1983.

=== Testimonial match ===
Dyl's testimonial match at Leeds took place in 1980.

=== International honours ===
Dyl won caps for England while at Leeds in 1975 against France, in the 1975 Rugby League World Cup against Wales, France, Wales, New Zealand, New Zealand (sub), Australia, and Australia, in 1975 against Papua New Guinea (non-test), in 1977 Wales, and France, in 1978 France, and Wales, in 1981 against Wales, and won caps for Great Britain while at Leeds in 1974 against Australia (2 matches), and New Zealand (3 matches), in the 1977 Rugby League World Cup against France, New Zealand, and Australia (2 matches) including the World Cup final at the Sydney Cricket Ground, in 1978 against Australia, and in 1982 against Australia.

In addition to test matches, Dyl appeared as a substitute in Great Britain's 7–8 defeat by France in the friendly at Stadio Pier Luigi Penzo, Venice on 31 July 1982.
