= Harry Jepson OBE Memorial Cup =

- Sport: Rugby league
- Instituted: 1912
- Number of teams: 2
- Country: (England) (RFL)
- Holders: Hunslet

The Harry Jepson OBE Memorial Cup (formerly the Lazenby Cup until 2017) is an annual pre-season friendly between English rugby league teams Leeds Rhinos and Hunslet.

== History ==
The Lazenby Cup was first played in 1912 after Tracey Lazenby donated the trophy to be played for by Hunslet F.C. and Leeds with the proceeds going to junior rugby in the city. Hunslet and Leeds both played for the trophy until 1972. After Hunslet F.C. was dissolved, Leeds played Bramley until 1985. The trophy was retired until 2004 when the it was contested between Leeds and Hunslet again.

In 2017 the cup was renamed the Harry Jepson OBE Memorial Cup after Harry Jepson who was club president of Leeds Rhinos and had strong links to Hunslet and died in 2016.

== Results ==
Year	Winner	Score	Runners up
1912	Leeds	14–6	Hunslet
1913	Hunslet	13–8	Leeds
1914			
1915	Leeds	25–5	Hunslet
1919	Leeds	17–14	Hunslet
1920	Hunslet	11–8	Leeds
1921	Leeds	21–5	Hunslet
1922	Hunslet	6–0	Leeds
1923	Leeds	9–0	Hunslet
1925	Hunslet	12–5	Leeds
1926	Hunslet	22–5	Leeds
1931	Hunslet	11–9	Leeds
1932	Hunslet	23–0	Leeds
1938	Leeds	26–3	Hunslet
1939	Leeds	23–3	Hunslet
1940	Hunslet	26–10	Leeds
1941	Leeds	45–10	Hunslet
1946	Hunslet	18–4	Leeds
1947	Hunslet	14–9	Leeds
1948	Hunslet	11–10	Leeds
1949	Leeds	23–10	Hunslet
1950	Leeds	17–12	Hunslet
1951		12–12	
1952	Hunslet	18–7	Leeds
1954	Leeds	13–5	Hunslet
1972	Leeds	57–0	Hunslet
2004	Leeds Rhinos	40–10	Hunslet Hawks
2005	Hunslet Hawks	24–22	Leeds Rhinos
2006	Hunslet Hawks	34–22	Leeds Rhinos
2007	Leeds Rhinos	12–8	Hunslet Hawks
2008	Leeds Rhinos	50–6	Hunslet Hawks
2009	Leeds Rhinos	11–10	Hunslet Hawks
2010	Leeds Rhinos	56–14	Hunslet Hawks
2011	Leeds Rhinos	36–26	Hunslet Hawks
2012	Leeds Rhinos	22–20	Hunslet Hawks
2013	Leeds Rhinos	10–6	Hunslet Hawks
2014	Hunslet Hawks	20–16	Leeds Rhinos
2015	Leeds Rhinos	28–14	Hunslet Hawks
2016	Leeds Rhinos	22–18	Hunslet Hawks
2017	Leeds Rhinos	21–14	Hunslet
2018	Hunslet	50–18	Leeds Rhinos
2019	Hunslet	34–28	Leeds Rhinos
2020	Hunslet	48–6	Leeds Rhinos
2021	Cancelled – Covid-19		
2022	Hunslet	34–6	Leeds Rhinos
2023	Hunslet	50–12	Leeds Rhinos
2024	Hunslet	18–16	Leeds Rhinos

=== Winners ===
	Team	Wins	Years
1	Leeds Rhinos	38	
2	Hunslet	22	
