= Old Craven Park =

Stadium in Kingston upon Hull, England

Coordinates: 53°45′46″N 0°17′33″W

- Interactive map of Old Craven Park
- Location: Holderness Road, Hull, East Riding of Yorkshire, England

Construction
- Opened: 1922
- Closed: 1989

Old Craven Park was a rugby league and greyhound racing stadium in Hull, East Riding of Yorkshire, England.

== Rugby league ==
Hull Kingston Rovers moved from Craven Street in East Hull to a new ground called Craven Park in 1922. The club had purchased a site behind the tram and bus depot on the eastern end of Holderness Road by Aberdeen Street at a cost of £18,281 and it hosted its first game on 2 September 1922.

The ground staged an Ashes series test in 1929 with Australia defeating Great Britain 31–8 in front of 20,000 fans.

In the early 1970s Hull Kingston Rovers purchased a site at Winchester Avenue with the aim of building a new stadium there. These plans never came to fruition and the site was later sold to a private developer. The profit made from this land was used to buy back Craven Park with greyhound racing continuing as a subsidiary concern.

=== Test matches ===
The list of international rugby league matches played at Craven Park is:

Game#	Date	Result	Attendance	Notes
1	5 October 1929	Australia def. England 31–8	20,000	1929–30 Kangaroo tour
2	1 February 1936	Wales def. England 17–14	20,000	1936–37 European Rugby League Championship
3	3 November 1951	Other Nationalities def. France 17–14	18,000	1951–52 European Rugby League Championship

=== Tour matches ===
Craven Park also saw the Hull Kingston Rovers, the county team Yorkshire and the Great Britain Under-24 side play host to international touring teams from Australia and New Zealand from 1926 to 1986.

game	Date	Result	Attendance	Notes
1	16 October 1926	New Zealand def. Hull Kingston Rovers 15–13	12,999	1926–27 New Zealand Kiwis tour
2	5 October 1929	Australia def. Hull Kingston Rovers 31–8	12,000	1929–30 Kangaroo tour
3	2 September 1933	Australia def. Hull Kingston Rovers 20–0	7,831	1933–34 Kangaroo tour
4	18 October 1948	Hull Kingston Rovers def. Australia 17–12	7,614	1948–49 Kangaroo tour
5	15 November 1952	Australia def. Hull Kingston Rovers 31–6	5,817	1952–53 Kangaroo tour
6	18 September 1963	Yorkshire def. Australia 11–5	10,324	1963–64 Kangaroo tour
7	7 October 1967	Hull Kingston Rovers def. Australia 27–15	11,252	1967–68 Kangaroo tour
8	7 November 1973	Australia def. Hull Kingston Rovers 25–9	5,150	1973 Kangaroo tour
9	4 October 1978	Australia def. Great Britain U/24 30–8	6,418	1978 Kangaroo tour
10	22 October 1980	New Zealand def. Hull Kingston Rovers 20–12	9,516	1980 New Zealand Kiwis tour
11	10 October 1982	Australia def. Hull Kingston Rovers 30–10	10,742	1982 Kangaroo tour
12	16 October 1983	Hull Kingston Rovers def. Queensland 8–6	6,383	1983 Queensland Maroons tour
13	15 October 1986	Australia def. Hull Kingston Rovers 46–10	6,868	1986 Kangaroo tour

== Greyhound racing ==
=== History ===
A company called Entertainments Hull Ltd brought greyhound racing to the stadium to rival the operation at the Boulevard Stadium and the first meeting took place on 5 May 1928. The lease was soon secured by the Associated Greyhound Company who also had control of Towneley Stadium in Burnley and Darnall Stadium in Sheffield but the company went bankrupt and the greyhound operation suffered difficult times with a depression on the horizon.

With the greyhound racing boom underway a new company called Hull (Craven Park) Stadium Ltd bought the stadium from Hull Kingston Rovers in 1938. The rugby team secured a 21-year lease in the £10,750 sale. The track raced under National Greyhound Racing Club (NGRC) rules and the circuit was described as a handy sized track with a circumference of 407 yards with good length straights and with starting boxed that are set back to take full advantage of the length of the straight. Banking was 1 in 12 and an 'Inside Sumner' hare was used. Distances of 292, 496 & 698 yards made up the races and the stadium kennels charged owners one guinea per week, an agreement that included veterinary attention.

Facilities included three covered enclosures; the large home straight enclosure offered two clubs, the Silver Ring Club and the Stadium Club. The Supporters Club was to be found within the back straight covered stand whilst the totalisator and racing office was situated between the third and fourth bends. Distances changed to 500 and 700 yards by 1946.

Business exceeded the much larger Boulevard venue and Craven Park managed to pass the £1 million mark in 1946 in regards to tote turnover.

The stadium opened a restaurant and four buffet bars for the public with racing held on Thursday and Saturday nights during the 1950s and 1960s and in 1975 the stadium was bought back by Hull Kingston Rovers. As the 1970s progressed Mr V Holland was brought in as the new Racing Manager and Roy Thickett became replacing the retiring Arthur Rising. Popular events at the track included the Hair Belle Trophy, Art Wells Stakes, Charles Key Memorial Stakes and the Jack Lawlor Trophy. The track trainers were Jack King and Sylvia Cooke and they were joined by Ray Jones and John Tollafield. The last meeting was held during March 1989.

=== Track records ===
Distance	Greyhound	Time	Date
292y	Noblesse Oblige	16.62	1946
295y	Spring Shower	16.47	14.08.1948
496y	Down Signal	28.43	1946
500y	Dronmore Printer	28.25	07.07.1948
500y	Promotive	28.22	05.10.1950
500y	Galbally Gallop	28.04	20.06.1963
500y	Ryedale Swallow	28.01	28.04.1966
700y	Lilacs Luck		April 1946
700y	Mileys Bridge	40.53	29.05.1948
700y	Clonalvy Sue	40.30	16.07.1964
268m	Spiral Gigi	15.91	10.07.1986
458m	Autumn Opinion	27.60	27.08.1987
462m	Inchy Sand	27.70	1987
644m	Black Lupin	40.70	29.01.1987
837m	Versatile Fury	53.90	19.05.1988

== Closure ==
Following the Bradford City stadium fire, capacity was restricted and costs of safety work spiraled. With the club in debt the ground was sold to developers and the final rugby league game was played there on 9 April 1989. John Kennedy the new general manager of the greyhounds was tasked with securing the future of the greyhound operation which moved two miles away to New Craven Park.

The ground was demolished and a supermarket was built on the land originally called Leo's then Co-op, it is now occupied by Morrisons.
