= 1976–77 Northern Rugby Football League season =

- League: Northern Rugby Football League
- Champions: Featherstone Rovers
- Premiership: St. Helens
- Man of Steel Award: David Ward
- Top point-scorer(s): Geoff Lloyd 341
- Top try-scorer(s): Stuart Wright 31

The 1976–77 Northern Rugby Football League season was the 82nd season of rugby league football. Sixteen English clubs competed for the Championship, with Featherstone Rovers claiming the title.

== Season summary ==
In July 1976, the Rugby League Council imposed a ban on players moving to Australian clubs on short term contracts unless a transfer fee was paid.

In April 1977, the League's executive committee recommended as of next season that points difference should be used to determine league position for teams level on points, instead of points average.

The League Champions were Featherstone Rovers for the first and, to date, only time. During the season, the Salford versus Leeds match was abandoned after 38 minutes when Chris Sanderson of Leeds suffered a fatal injury. Leeds were ahead 5-2, but the game was declared null and void and not replayed.

Rochdale Hornets, Leigh, Barrow and Oldham were demoted to the Second Division.

The Challenge Cup Winners were Leeds who beat Widnes 16-7 in the final.

2nd Division Champions were Hull FC, and they, Dewsbury, Bramley and New Hunslet were promoted to the First Division.

== League Tables ==
=== First Division Championship ===
	Team	Pld	W	D	L	PF	PA	Pts
1	Featherstone Rovers	30	21	2	7	568	334	44
2	St. Helens	30	19	1	10	547	345	39
3	Castleford	30	19	1	10	519	350	39
4	Hull Kingston Rovers	30	18	1	11	496	415	37
5	Warrington	30	18	0	12	532	406	36
6	Salford	29	17	1	11	560	402	35
7	Wigan	30	15	2	13	463	416	32
8	Bradford Northern	30	15	2	13	488	470	32
9	Leeds	29	14	2	13	467	439	30
10	Widnes	30	15	0	15	403	393	30
11	Wakefield Trinity	30	13	2	15	487	480	28
12	Workington Town	30	13	1	16	352	403	27
13	Rochdale Hornets	30	11	0	19	367	449	22
14	Leigh	30	8	1	21	314	634	17
15	Barrow	30	8	0	22	345	628	16
16	Oldham	30	7	0	23	322	666	14

=== Second Division Championship ===
	Team	Pld	W	D	L	PF	PA	Pts
1	Hull	26	22	1	3	599	238	45
2	Dewsbury	26	19	2	5	429	199	40
3	Bramley	26	19	0	7	464	377	38
4	New Hunslet	26	17	3	6	411	231	37
5	York	26	17	0	9	422	279	34
6	Keighley	26	16	1	9	486	235	33
7	Huddersfield	26	13	0	13	397	329	26
8	Whitehaven	26	11	1	14	290	346	23
9	Huyton	26	11	0	15	302	402	22
10	Halifax	26	10	0	16	301	429	20
11	Swinton	26	8	2	16	261	406	18
12	Batley	26	7	1	18	262	461	15
13	Blackpool Borough	26	5	1	20	233	464	11
14	Doncaster	26	1	0	25	243	704	2

== Cups ==
=== Challenge Cup ===
Leeds beat Widnes 16-7 in the final played at Wembley Stadium on Saturday 7 May 1977 in front of a crowd of 80,871. The winner of the Lance Todd Trophy was the Leeds prop, Steve Pitchford.

This was Leeds’ tenth Cup Final win in fourteen Final appearances.

=== County cups ===
Widnes beat Workington Town (from Cumbria) 16–11 to win the Lancashire County Cup, and Leeds beat Featherstone Rovers 16–12 to win the Yorkshire County Cup.

=== BBC2 Floodlit Trophy ===
BBC2 Floodlit Trophy Winners were Castleford who beat Leigh 12-4 in the final.

=== Player's No.6 Trophy ===
Players No.6 Trophy Winners were Castleford who beat Blackpool Borough 25-15.

=== Premiership ===
Rugby League Premiership Trophy Winners were St. Helens who beat Warrington 32-20.

== Sources ==
- 1976-77 Rugby Football League season at wigan.rlfans.com
- The Challenge Cup at The Rugby Football League website
