= 1974–75 Rugby League Premiership =

1974–75 Premiership
- Structure: National knockout championship
- Winners: Leeds
- Runners-up: St Helens

The 1974–75 Rugby League Premiership was the inaugural edition of the end of season Rugby League Premiership competition.

The winners were Leeds.

== First round ==
| Date | Home team | Score | Away team | Attendance |
|---|---|---|---|---|
| 25 April 1975 | Castleford | 37–7 | Wakefield Trinity | 2,915 |
| 25 April 1975 | St Helens | 42–5 | Oldham | 3,700 |
| 26 April 1975 | Bradford Northern | 22–14 | Warrington | 3,084 |
| 26 April 1975 | Wigan | 19–17 | Swinton | 4,219 |
| 27 April 1975 | Dewsbury | 8–9 | Keighley | 2,700 |
| 27 April 1975 | Featherstone Rovers | 8–27 | Leeds | 3,000 |
| 27 April 1975 | Huddersfield | 18–35 | Hull Kingston Rovers | 2,994 |
| 27 April 1975 | Widnes | 12–20 | Salford | 7,200 |

== Second round ==
| Date | Home team | Score | Away team | Attendance |
|---|---|---|---|---|
| 29 April 1975 | Leeds | 28–8 | Castleford | 6,316 |
| 29 April 1975 | Wigan | 35–17 | Salford | 4,514 |
| 30 April 1975 | Hull Kingston Rovers | 29–10 | Keighley | 4,861 |
| 1 May 1975 | Bradford Northern | 5–5 | St Helens | 5,590 |

=== Replay ===
| Date | Home team | Score | Away team | Attendance |
|---|---|---|---|---|
| 2 May 1975 | St Helens | 14-5 | Bradford Northern | 7,000 |

== Semi finals ==
4 May 1975

| Leeds | 18 – 8 | Hull Kingston Rovers |
|---|---|---|
| Tries: Dyl, Smith, Mason, Batten; Goals: Holmes (3) | | Tries: Millward, Sullivan; Goals: Fox |

Headingley, Leeds
Attendance: 7,417

4 May 1975

| Wigan | 16 – 22 | St Helens |
|---|---|---|
| Tries: Gregory, Irving; Goals: Fairbairn (5) | | Tries: Pimblett, Wilson, Walsh, Chisnall; Goals: Coslett (5) |

Central Park, Wigan
Attendance: 13,900

== Final ==
17 May 1975

| Leeds | 26 – 11 | St Helens |
|---|---|---|
| Tries: Atkinson (2), Mason, Hynes, Smith; Goals: Holmes (2), Marshall (3); Drop goals: Hynes | | Tries: Jones, Mathias, Heaton; Goals: Coslett |

Central Park, Wigan
Attendance: 14,531
Referee: W. H. Thompson (Huddersfield)
Player of the Match: Mel Mason

| 1 | John Holmes | (substituted off) 34' |
| 2 | Alan Smith |
| 3 | Syd Hynes (c) | (substituted off) 40' |
| 4 | Les Dyl |
| 5 | John Atkinson |
| 6 | Mel Mason |
| 7 | Keith Hepworth |
| 8 | Roy Dickinson |
| 9 | David Ward |
| 10 | Steve Pitchford |
| 11 | Phil Cookson |
| 12 | Ray Batten |
| 13 | Bob Haigh |
Substitutes:
| 14 | David Marshall | (substituted in) 34' |
| 15 | Graham Eccles | (substituted in) 40' |
Coach:
Roy Francis

| 1 | Geoff Pimblett |
| 2 | Les Jones |
| 3 | Frank Wilson |
| 4 | David Hull |
| 5 | Roy Mathias |
| 6 | John Walsh |
| 7 | Jeff Heaton |
| 8 | John Warlow | (substituted off) 8' |
| 9 | Tony Karalius |
| 10 | John Mantle | (substituted off) 32' |
| 11 | George Nicholls |
| 12 | Eric Chisnall |
| 13 | Kel Coslett (c) |
Substitutes:
| 14 | Ken Gwilliam | (substituted in) 32' |
| 15 | Eddie Cunningham | (substituted in) 8' |
Coach:
Eric Ashton
