= 1970–71 BBC2 Floodlit Trophy =

- Structure: Floodlit knockout championship
- Teams: 18
- Winners: Leeds
- Runners-up: St. Helens

The 1970–71 BBC2 Floodlit Trophy was the sixth occasion on which the BBC2 Floodlit Trophy competition had been held.
This year was another new name on the trophy - and ALSO St. Helens' third time in six years as runner-up
Leeds won the trophy by beating St. Helens by the score of 9-5
The match was played at Headingley, Leeds, now in West Yorkshire. The attendance was 7,612 and receipts were £2,189

== Background ==
This season saw no changes in the entrants, no new members and no withdrawals, the number remaining at eighteen.
The format was changed slightly removing the two-legged home and away ties from the preliminary round and playing the whole competition on a knock-out basis.
The preliminary round involved four clubs, to reduce the numbers to sixteen.

== Competition and results ==
=== Preliminary round ===
Involved 2 matches and 4 clubs

Game No	Fixture date	Home team	Score	Away team	Venue	Att	Rec	Notes	Ref
P	Tue 29 Sep 1970	Huddersfield	16-14	Wakefield Trinity	Fartown				
P	Thu 8 Oct 1970	Leigh	17-0	Swinton	Hilton Park				

=== Round 1 – first round ===
Involved 8 matches and 16 clubs

Game No	Fixture date	Home team	Score	Away team	Venue	Att	Rec	Notes	Ref
1	Tue 15 Sep 1970	Wigan	28-0	Keighley	Central Park				
2	Fri 19 Sep 1970	Hull Kingston Rovers	25-13	Warrington	Craven Park (1)				
3	Tue 29 Sep 1970	St. Helens	14-7	Castleford	Knowsley Road	7000			
4	Tue 6 Oct 1970	Barrow	6-15	Leeds	Craven Park				
5	Tue 13 Oct 1970	Halifax	14-15	Hull F.C.	Thrum Hall				
6	Tue 20 Oct 1970	Salford	2-7	Widnes	The Willows				
7	Fri 23 Oct 1970	Huddersfield	14-5	Oldham	Fartown				
8	Tue 27 Oct 1970	Leigh	14-5	Rochdale Hornets	Hilton Park				

=== Round 2 – quarter finals ===
Involved 4 matches with 8 clubs

Game No	Fixture date	Home team	Score	Away team	Venue	Att	Rec	Notes	Ref
1	Tue 3 Nov 1970	Hull Kingston Rovers	18-8	Hull F.C.	Craven Park (1)				
2	Tue 10 Nov 1970	Widnes	6-16	Leeds	Naughton Park				
3	Tue 24 Nov 1970	Wigan	25-9	Huddersfield	Central Park			1	
4	Mon 30 Nov 1970	Leigh	4-10	St. Helens	Hilton Park	10372			

=== Round 3 – semi-finals ===
Involved 2 matches and 4 clubs

Game No	Fixture date	Home team	Score	Away team	Venue	Att	Rec	Notes	Ref
1	Tue 1 Dec 1970	Leeds	24-2	Hull Kingston Rovers	Headingley				
2	Tue 8 Dec 1970	Wigan	7-7	St. Helens	Central Park	10372		1	

=== Round 3 – Semi-finals – replays ===
Involved 1 match and 2 clubs

Game No	Fixture date	Home team	Score	Away team	Venue	Att	Rec	Notes	Ref
R	Sun 13 Dec 1970	St. Helens	16-15	Wigan	Knowsley Road	10285			

=== Final ===
Game No	Fixture date	Home team	Score	Away team	Venue	Att	Rec	Notes	Ref
F	Tuesday 15 December 1970	Leeds	9-5	St. Helens	Headingley	7,612	2,189	1 2	

==== Teams and scorers ====
Leeds	№	St. Helens
	teams	
John Holmes	1	Frank Barrow
Alan Smith	2	Les Jones
Syd Hynes	3	Billy Benyon
Ronnie Cowan	4	Johnny Walsh
John Atkinson	5	Frank Wilson
Anthony "Tony" Wainwright	6	Alan Whittle
Mick Shoebottom	7	Jeff Heaton
John Burke	8	Graham Rees
Tony Fisher	9	Anthony "Tony" Karalius
Edward/Edwin "Ted" Barnard	10	Eric Chisnall
Bob Haigh	11	John Mantle
Bill Ramsey	12	Eric Prescott
Ray Batten	13	Kel Coslett
Derek Turner	Coach	Jim Challinor
9	score	5
7	HT	3
	Scorers	
	Tries	
Syd Hynes (1)	T	Les Jones (1)
	Goals	
John Holmes (2)	G	Kel Coslett (1)
Syd Hynes (1)	G	
Referee		E. Lawrinson (Warrington)

Scoring - Try = three (3) points - Goal = two (2) points - Drop goal = two (2) points

=== The road to success ===
This tree excludes any preliminary round fixtures

First round
Salford	2
Widnes	7
Barrow	6
Leeds	15
Hull Kingston Rovers	25
Warrington	13
Halifax	14
Hull F.C.	15
Wigan	28
Keighley	0
Huddersfield	14
Oldham	5
Leigh	14
Rochdale Hornets	5
St. Helens	14
Castleford	7

Second round
Widnes	6
Leeds	16
Hull Kingston Rovers	18
Hull F.C.	8
Wigan	25
Huddersfield	9
Leigh	4
St. Helens	10

Semi-finals
Leeds	24
Hull Kingston Rovers	2
Wigan	7 (15)
St. Helens	7 (16)

Final
Leeds	9
St. Helens	5

== Notes and comments ==
1 * This match was televised
2 * Headingley, Leeds, is the home ground of Leeds RLFC with a capacity of 21,000. The record attendance was 40,175 for a league match between Leeds and Bradford Northern on 21 May 1947.

== See also ==
- 1970–71 Northern Rugby Football League season
- 1970 Lancashire Cup
- 1970 Yorkshire Cup
- BBC2 Floodlit Trophy
- Rugby league county cups
