= 1971–72 BBC2 Floodlit Trophy =

- Structure: Floodlit knockout championship
- Teams: 18
- Winners: St. Helens
- Runners-up: Rochdale Hornets

The 1971–72 BBC2 Floodlit Trophy was the seventh occasion on which the BBC2 Floodlit Trophy competition had been held.
This year was another new name on the trophy
St. Helens won the trophy by beating Rochdale Hornets by the score of 8-2
The match was played at Knowsley Road, Eccleston, St Helens, Merseyside. The attendance was 9,255 and receipts were £2,493
This was St. Helens first victory after being runner-up in three of the previous six finals

== Background ==
This season saw no changes in the entrants, no new members and no withdrawals, the number remaining at eighteen.
The format was changed back to that favoured in previous seasons when the preliminary round was played on a two-legged home and away basis with the rest of the tournament being played on a knock-out basis.
The preliminary round involved four clubs, to reduce the numbers to sixteen.

== Competition and results ==
=== Preliminary round – first leg ===
Involved 2 matches and 4 clubs

| Game No | Fixture date | Home team | Score | Away team | Venue | agg | Att | Rec | Notes | Ref |
|---|---|---|---|---|---|---|---|---|---|---|
| P1 | Mon 13 Sep 1971 | Wigan | 23-11 | Barrow | Central Park | | | | | |
| P1 | Wed 15 Sep 1971 | Rochdale Hornets | 28-2 | Oldham | Athletic Grounds | | | | | |

=== Preliminary round – second leg ===
Involved 2 matches and the same 4 Clubs in reverse fixtures

| Game No | Fixture date | Home team | Score | Away team | Venue | agg | Att | Rec | Notes | Ref |
|---|---|---|---|---|---|---|---|---|---|---|
| P2 | Mon 20 Sep 1971 | Barrow | 11-19 | Wigan | Craven Park | 22-42 | | | | |
| P2 | Wed 29 Sep 1971 | Oldham | 16-14 | Rochdale Hornets | Watersheddings | 18-42 | | | | |

=== Round 1 – first round ===
Involved 8 matches and 16 clubs

| Game No | Fixture date | Home team | Score | Away team | Venue | Att | Rec | Notes | Ref |
|---|---|---|---|---|---|---|---|---|---|
| 1 | Tue 21 Sep 1971 | Hull F.C. | 23-16 | Wakefield Trinity | Boulevard | | | | |
| 2 | Tue 21 Sep 1971 | Swinton | 9-14 | St. Helens | Station Road | 2;650 | | | |
| 3 | Tue 28 Sep 1971 | Leeds | 33-13 | Hull Kingston Rovers | Headingley | | | | |
| 4 | Wed 29 Sep 1971 | Halifax | 16-8 | Keighley | Thrum Hall | | | | |
| 5 | Tue 5 Oct 1971 | Castleford | 7-8 | Huddersfield | Wheldon Road | | | | |
| 6 | Tue 12 Oct 1971 | Leigh | 6-2 | Warrington | Hilton Park | | | | |
| 7 | Tue 19 Oct 1971 | Salford | 15-17 | Rochdale Hornets | The Willows | | | | |
| 8 | Tue 26 Oct 1971 | Wigan | 10-15 | Widnes | Central Park | | | 1 | |

=== Round 2 – quarter finals ===
Involved 4 matches with 8 clubs

| Game No | Fixture date | Home team | Score | Away team | Venue | Att | Rec | Notes | Ref |
|---|---|---|---|---|---|---|---|---|---|
| 1 | Tue 2 Nov 1971 | Leeds | 26-10 | Halifax | Headingley | | | | |
| 2 | Tue 9 Nov 1971 | Leigh | 4-13 | St. Helens | Hilton Park | 4500 | | | |
| 3 | Tue 16 Nov 1971 | Huddersfield | 7-15 | Hull F.C. | Fartown | | | | |
| 4 | Tue 23 Nov 1971 | Rochdale Hornets | 6-5 | Widnes | Athletic Grounds | | | | |

=== Round 3 – semi-finals ===
Involved 2 matches and 4 clubs

| Game No | Fixture date | Home team | Score | Away team | Venue | Att | Rec | Notes | Ref |
|---|---|---|---|---|---|---|---|---|---|
| 1 | Tue 30 Nov 1971 | Leeds | 0-17 | St. Helens | Headingley | 6;269 | | | |
| 2 | Tue 7 Dec 1971 | Rochdale Hornets | 30-8 | Hull F.C. | Athletic Grounds | | | | |

=== Final ===
| Game No | Fixture date | Home team | Score | Away team | Venue | Att | Rec | Notes | Ref |
|---|---|---|---|---|---|---|---|---|---|
| F | Tuesday 14 December 1971 | St. Helens | 8-2 | Rochdale Hornets | Knowsley Road | 9,255 | 2,493 | 1 2 3 | |

==== Teams and scorers ====
| St. Helens | № | Rochdale Hornets |
|---|---|---|
| | teams | |
| Geoff Pimblett | 1 | Joe Chamberlain |
| Les Jones | 2 | Norman Brelsford |
| Billy Benyon | 3 | J. Crelin |
| Johnny Walsh | 4 | D. Taylor |
| Frank Wilson | 5 | B. Glover |
| Ken Kelly | 6 | Frank Myler |
| Jeff Heaton | 7 | Peter Gartland |
| Graham Rees | 8 | Peter Birchall |
| Anthony "Tony" Karalius | 9 | P. Clarke |
| Eric Chisnall | 10 | E. Brown |
| Eric Prescott | 11 | R. Welding |
| John Mantle | 12 | Billy Sheffield |
| Kel Coslett | 13 | Henry Delooze |
| | Subs | |
| John Houghton | 14 | Hammond |
| John Stephens | 15 | Alan Hodkinson (for Billy Sheffield) |
| Jim Challinor | Coach | Frank Myler |
| 8 | score | 2 |
| 4 | HT | 2 |
| | Scorers | |
| | Goals | |
| Kel Coslett (4) | G | Joe Chamberlain (1) |
| Referee | | "Sergeant Major" Eric Clay (Leeds) |

Scoring - Try = three (3) points - Goal = two (2) points - Drop goal = two (2) points

=== The road to success ===
This tree excludes any preliminary round fixtures

First round
Leeds | 33
Hull Kingston Rovers | 13
Halifax | 16
Keighley | 8
Leigh | 6
Warrington | 2
Swinton | 9
St Helens | 14
Salford | 15
Rochdale Hornets | 17
Wigan | 10
Widnes | 15
Castleford | 7
Huddersfield | 8
Hull F.C. | 23
Wakefield Trinity | 16

Second round
Leeds | 26
Halifax | 10
Leigh | 4
St Helens | 13
Rochdale Hornets | 6
Widnes | 5
Huddersfield | 7
Hull F.C. | 15

Semi-finals
Leeds | 0
St Helens | 17
Rochdale Hornets | 30
Hull F.C. | 8

Final
St Helens | 8
Rochdale Hornets | 2

== Notes and comments ==
1 * This match was televised
2 * Rothmans Rugby League Yearbook 1990-1991 and 1991-92 and the St. Helens official archives give the attendance as 9,300, but RUGBYLEAGUEprojects gives it as 9,255
3 * Knowsley Road was the home of St Helens R.F.C. from 1890 until its closure in 2010. The final capacity was 17,500 although the record attendance was 35,695 set on 26 December 1949 for a league game between St Helens and Wigan.

== See also ==
- 1971–72 Northern Rugby Football League season
- 1971 Lancashire Cup
- 1971 Yorkshire Cup
- BBC2 Floodlit Trophy
- Rugby league county cups
