= Bob Haigh =

Great Britain and England international rugby league footballer (born 1943)

Personal information
- Full name: Robert Haigh
- Born: 11 November 1943 (age 82)

Playing information
- Position: Second-row, Loose forward
Club
Years	Team	Pld	T	G	FG	P
1962–70	Wakefield Trinity	250
1970–77	Leeds	167	93	0	0	279
1977–79	Bradford Northern	63	18	0	0	54
	Total	480	111	0	0	333
Representative
Years	Team	Pld	T	G	FG	P
	Yorkshire
1969–70	England	2	1	0	0	3
1968–71	Great Britain	7	0	0	0	0

Coaching information
Club
Years	Team	Gms	W	D	L	W%
1984	Wakefield Trinity

Robert Haigh (born 11 November 1943) is an English former rugby league footballer who played in the 1960s and 1970s, and coached in the 1970s. He played at representative level for Great Britain, England and Yorkshire, and at club level for Wakefield Trinity (captain), Leeds and Bradford Northern, as a second-row, or loose forward.

== Playing career ==
=== Wakefield Trinity ===
Haigh played at second-row in Wakefield Trinity's 18–2 victory over Leeds in the 1964 Yorkshire Cup Final during the 1964–65 season at Fartown Ground, Huddersfield on Saturday 31 October 1964.

He played at second-row in Wakefield Trinity's 21–9 victory over St. Helens in the Championship Final replay during the 1966–67 season at Station Road, Swinton on Wednesday 10 May 1967, and played at second-row in the 17-10 victory over Hull Kingston Rovers in the Championship Final during the 1967–68 season at Headingley, Leeds on Saturday 4 May 1968.

Haigh played at second-row in Wakefield Trinity's 10–11 defeat by Leeds in the 1968 Challenge Cup "Watersplash" Final during the 1967–68 season at Wembley Stadium, London on Saturday 11 May 1968, in front of a crowd of 87,100.

=== Leeds ===
Haigh played at second-row in Leeds' 23–7 victory over Featherstone Rovers in the 1970 Yorkshire Cup Final during the 1970–71 season at Odsal Stadium, Bradford on Saturday 21 November 1970.

He played at second-row in Leeds' 9–5 victory over St. Helens in the 1970 BBC2 Floodlit Trophy Final during the 1970–71 season at Headingley, Leeds on Tuesday 15 December 1970.

Haigh played at second-row in Leeds' 7–24 defeat by Leigh in the 1971 Challenge Cup Final during the 1970–71 season at Wembley Stadium, London on Saturday 15 May 1971, in front of a crowd of 85,514, and played at second-row in the 13-16 defeat by St. Helens in the 1972 Challenge Cup Final during the 1971–72 season at Wembley Stadium, London on Saturday 13 May 1972.

He played at second-row in Leeds' 12–7 victory over Salford in the 1972–73 Player's No.6 Trophy Final during the 1972–73 season at Fartown Ground, Huddersfield on Saturday 24 March 1973.

=== Bradford Northern ===
Haigh played, and was man of the match winning the Harry Sunderland Trophy (At 34 years, 190 days, he's the oldest player to win the trophy) in Bradford Northern's 17–8 victory over Widnes in the Championship Final during the 1977–78 season.

He played loose forward and was man of the match winning the White Rose Trophy in Bradford Northern's 18-8 victory over York in the 1978 Yorkshire Cup Final during the 1978–79 season at Headingley, Leeds on Saturday 28 October 1978.

=== Representative honours ===
Haigh won caps for England while at Wakefield Trinity in 1969 against Wales, and France, in 1970 against Wales, and won caps for Great Britain while at Wakefield Trinity in the 1968 Rugby League World Cup against Australia, and France, while at Leeds in the 1970 Rugby League World Cup against New Zealand, and Australia, and in 1971 against France, and New Zealand.

Alongside fellow Wakefield Trinity player, Ian Brooke, Bob Haigh was selected to play for Great Britain in the 1968 Rugby League World Cup in Australia and New Zealand.

Alongside fellow Leeds players, John Atkinson, Tony Fisher, Syd Hynes, Mick Shoebottom and Alan Smith, Bob Haigh was selected to play for Great Britain in the 1970 Rugby League World Cup in Great Britain.

Haigh won cap(s) for Yorkshire while at Wakefield Trinity.
