= Geoff Clarkson =

English rugby union & league footballer

Personal information
- Full name: Geoffrey Clarkson
- Born: 12 August 1943; Wakefield, England
- Died: 10 July 2001 (aged 57); Huddersfield, England

Playing information

Rugby union
Club
Years	Team	Pld	T	G	FG	P
≤1965–65	Wakefield RFC
Representative
Years	Team	Pld	T	G	FG	P
<1965–<65	Yorkshire

Rugby league
- Position: Second-row
Club
Years	Team	Pld	T	G	FG	P
1965–68	Wakefield Trinity (Note: statistics aggregate both spells at club)	79	11	2	0	37
1968–70	Bradford Northern	57+1	8	0	0	24
1970–71	Leigh (Note: statistics aggregate both spells at club)	107	9	0	0	27
1971–72	Warrington	35+1	0	0	0	0
1972–75	Leeds	66+3	3	0	0	9
1975–76	York	36	4	0	0	12
1976–78	Bramley	23	2	0	0	6
1978	Wakefield Trinity
1978–80	Hull Kingston Rovers	43+8	3	0	0	9
1979–80	Bradford Northern	18+3	1	0	0	3
1980–81	Oldham	11	0	0	0	0
1981–83	Leigh
1983–84	Featherstone Rovers	11+1	0	0	0	0
	Total	503	41	2	0	127
Representative
Years	Team	Pld	T	G	FG	P
1967	Yorkshire	2	0	0	0	0

Geoffrey Clarkson (12 August 1943 – 10 July 2001) was an English rugby union, and professional rugby league footballer who played in the 1960s, 1970s and 1980s. He played representative level rugby union (RU) for Yorkshire, and at club level for Wakefield RFC, and representative level rugby league (RL) for Yorkshire, and at club level for Wakefield Trinity (two spells), Bradford Northern (two spells), Leigh (two spells), Warrington, Leeds, York, Bramley, Hull Kingston Rovers, Oldham and Featherstone Rovers, as a second-row.

== Background ==
Geoff Clarkson was born in Wakefield, West Riding of Yorkshire, England and he died aged 57 in Huddersfield, West Yorkshire, England.

== Playing career ==
Geoff Clarkson turned professional with Wakefield Trinity in 1965 after gaining Yorkshire County rugby union forward honours while at Wakefield RFC.

Geoff Clarkson won cap(s) for Yorkshire (RL) while at Wakefield Trinity.

Geoff Clarkson played at second-row in Wakefield Trinity's 21–9 victory over St. Helens in the Championship Final replay during the 1966–67 season at Station Road, Swinton on Wednesday 10 May 1967.

Geoff Clarkson played at second-row in Leigh's 7–4 victory over St. Helens in the 1970 Lancashire Cup Final during the 1970–71 season at Station Road, Swinton on Saturday 28 November 1970, played at second-row in Leigh's 24–7 victory over Leeds in the 1971 Challenge Cup Final during the 1970–71 season at Wembley Stadium, London on Saturday 15 May 1971, in front of a crowd of 85,514, and played at second-row in Leigh's 8–3 victory over Widnes in the 1981 Lancashire Cup Final during the 1981–82 season at Central Park, Wigan on Saturday 26 September 1981.

Geoff Clarkson played at second-row in Hull Kingston Rovers' 3–13 defeat by Hull F.C. in the 1979 BBC2 Floodlit Trophy Final during the 1979–80 season at The Boulevard, Hull on Tuesday 18 December 1979.

Geoff Clarkson extended his record number of transfers to 12 when he left Leigh for Featherstone Rovers on 27 October 1983. He played for 10 different English clubs, and also had a brief spell in Australia, he was 40 years old when he finished playing regular first team rugby in 1983–84.

=== Club career ===
Geoff Clarkson made his début for Wakefield Trinity during December 1965, he played his last match (during his second spell) for Wakefield Trinity during the 1977–78 season, he made his début for Leigh during the 1970–71 season, he played his last match (during his second spell) for Leigh on Thursday 27 October 1983, during the 1983–84 season, he made his début for Warrington on Friday 20 August 1971, he played his last match for Warrington on Sunday 22 October 1972, he made his début for Featherstone Rovers on Sunday 30 October 1983, he played his last match for Featherstone Rovers during the 1983–84 season.
