= Joseph Walsh (rugby league) =

GB international rugby league footballer

Joe Walsh
Personal information
- Full name: Michael Joseph Walsh
- Born: c. 1944; Widnes, England
- Died: 24 December 2008 (aged 64); Scunthorpe, England

Playing information
- Position: Wing
Club
Years	Team	Pld	T	G	FG	P
1965–77	Leigh	353	128	0	0	384
1978–79	Warrington	9+1	1	0	0	3
	Total	363	129	0	0	387
Representative
Years	Team	Pld	T	G	FG	P
1970–71	Lancashire	4	0	0	0	0
1971	Great Britain	1	1	0	0	3

Michael Joseph Walsh (c. 1944 – 24 December 2008) was an English professional rugby league footballer who played in the 1960s and 1970s. He played at representative level for Great Britain, and at club level for Leigh, and Warrington, as a wing.

== Background ==
Walsh was born in Widnes, Lancashire, England, and he died aged 64 in Lindsey Lodge Hospice in Scunthorpe, North Lincolnshire.

== Playing career ==
=== International honours ===
Walsh won a cap, and scored a try, for Great Britain while at Leigh in 1971 against New Zealand at Wheldon Road, Castleford.

=== Challenge Cup Final appearances ===
Walsh played left wing in Leigh's 24–7 victory over Leeds in the 1971 Challenge Cup Final during the 1970–71 season at Wembley Stadium, London on Saturday 15 May 1971, in front of a crowd of 85,514.

=== County Cup Final appearances ===
Walsh played left wing in Leigh's 7–4 victory over St. Helens in the 1970 Lancashire Cup Final during the 1970–71 season at Station Road, Swinton on Saturday 28 November 1970.

=== BBC2 Floodlit Trophy Final appearances ===
Walsh played left wing in Leigh's 5–8 defeat by Castleford in the 1967 BBC2 Floodlit Trophy Final during the 1967–68 season at Headingley, Leeds on Saturday 16 January 1968, played left wing in the 11–6 victory over Wigan in the 1969 BBC2 Floodlit Trophy Final during the 1969–70 season at Central Park, Wigan on Tuesday 16 December 1969, and played left wing in the 4–12 defeat by Castleford in the 1976 BBC2 Floodlit Trophy Final during the 1976–77 season at Hilton Park, Leigh on Tuesday 14 December 1976.

=== Notable tour matches ===
Walsh made his full (starting) début for Warrington, and played left wing in Warrington's 15–12 victory over Australia in the 1978 Kangaroo tour of Great Britain and France match at Wilderspool Stadium, Warrington on Wednesday 11 October 1978.

=== Club career ===
Walsh made début for Leigh, and scored a try in the 17–7 victory over Leeds at Hilton Park, Leigh, Lancashire, the first-ever player to score a try when the first professional matches were allowed to take place Sundays in 1967, and he made his début for Warrington on Sunday 8 October 1978, and he played his last match for Warrington Friday 13 April 1979.
