= Eric Prescott =

English rugby league footballer (1948–2023)

William Eric Prescott
Personal information
- Born: 21 June 1948 Widnes, Lancashire, England
- Died: 21 August 2023 (aged 75)

Playing information
- Position: Wing, Centre, Second-row, Loose forward
Club
Years	Team	Pld	T	G	FG	P
1968–72	St Helens	88	20	3	2	68
1972–80	Salford	273	46	7	1	153
1980–84	Widnes	127	19	0	1	63
1984	Salford	18	5	0	0	20
1985–89	Runcorn Highfield	85	9	0	1	37
	Total	591	99	10	5	341
Representative
Years	Team	Pld	T	G	FG	P
1970–79	Lancashire	11	2	0	0	6
- Relatives: Steve Prescott (son); Alan Prescott (cousin); Robin Whitfield (cousin); Colin Whitfield (cousin)

William Eric Prescott (21 June 1948 – 21 August 2023) was an English rugby union, and professional rugby league footballer who played in the 1960s, 1970s and 1980s. He played club level rugby union (RU) for Widnes ICI RUFC, and representative level rugby league (RL) for Lancashire, and at club level for St Helens, Salford (two spells), Widnes and Runcorn Highfield, as a wing, centre, second-row or loose forward. He was the father of England and Ireland international rugby league player, Steve Prescott, cousin to Great Britain Ashes captain Alan Prescott, Robin Whitfield & Colin Whitfield

== Background ==
Eric Prescott was born in Widnes, Lancashire, England. He died on 21 August 2023, at the age of 75.

== Playing career ==
=== St Helens ===
Prescott joined St Helens in 1968, making his debut on Saturday 12 October 1968 v Leeds, he appeared in his first Championship final in the 1969–70 season when he played on the wing, and scored two-tries in St. Helens' 24-12 victory over Leeds at Odsal Stadium, Bradford on Saturday 16 May 1970, The following season he was a substitute (replacing prop Graham Rees) in St. Helens' 4-7 defeat by Leigh in the 1970 Lancashire Cup Final at Station Road, Swinton on Saturday 28 November 1970.

Prescott appeared for St Helens in three finals of the BBC2 Floodlit Trophy. In the 1968 final he was substitute as St Helens lost 4–7 to Wigan at Central Park, Wigan on Tuesday 17 December 1968, In 1970 he was in St Helens' starting line-up, playing at second-row in the 5-9 defeat by Leeds at Headingley, Leeds on Tuesday 15 December 1970. He was, eventually, on the winning side in 1971 when he played at second-row in the 8-2 victory over Rochdale Hornets at Headingley Stadium on Tuesday 14 December 1971. His final game for St helens was on Monday 28 August 1972 v Huyton.

=== Salford ===
Prescott was transferred from St. Helens to Salford for a world record fee of £13,500 on 6 September 1972. As well as being part of the Salford team that won the league in the 1973–74, and 1975–76, Prescott appeared at loose forward in Salford's 2-15 defeat by St. Helens in the Premiership Final during the 1975–76 season at Station Road, Swinton on Saturday 22 May 1976.

Prescott and Salford appeared in four consecutive Lancashire Cup finals between 1972 and 1975, losing all of them. At loose forward Prescott was in Salford's 25-11 victory over Swinton in the 1972 Final at Wilderspool Stadium, Warrington on Saturday 21 October 1972, played loose forward in the 9-19 defeat by Wigan in the 1973 Final at Wilderspool on Saturday 13 October 1973, played loose forward in the 2-6 defeat by Widnes in the 1974 Final at Central Park, Wigan on Saturday 2 November 1974, played loose forward in the 7-16 defeat by Widnes in the 1975 Final at Central Park, Wigan on Saturday 4 October 1975.

Prescott played loose forward in Salford's 0-0 draw with Warrington in the 1974 BBC2 Floodlit Trophy Final during the at The Willows, Salford on Tuesday 17 December 1974, and played loose forward in the 10-5 victory over Warrington replay at Wilderspool Stadium, Warrington on Tuesday 28 January 1975.

=== Widnes ===
Prescott was transferred from Salford to Widnes for a fee of £22,000 in 1980. With his hometown club Widnes he made two appearances in the Challenge Cup final. The first in the 1981 final as Widnes defeated Hull Kingston Rovers 18–9 at Wembley Stadium, London on Saturday 2 May 1981. The second was the following year when Widnes drew 14–14 with Hull F.C. at Wembley on Saturday 1 May 1982 in front of a crowd of 92,147. Two weeks later, he played at second-row in the 9-18 defeat by Hull F.C. in the replay at Elland Road, Leeds on Wednesday 19 May 1982, in front of a crowd of 41,171.

His career at Widnes also included two more Lancashire Cup finals; the 3-8 defeat by Leigh in the 1981 Final at Central Park, Wigan on Saturday 26 September 1981, and in the 8-12 defeat by Barrow in the 1983 Final at Central Park, Wigan on Saturday 1 October 1983. His final game for Widnes was in the John Player Special Trophy final as an unused substitute at Central Park, Wigan on Saturday 14 January 1984 in the 18 - 10 defeat by Leeds.

=== Return to Salford ===
Prescott returned to Salford in January 1984 in a player exchange deal which saw John Wood make the move in the opposite direction. His last match for Salford was on Wednesday 26 December 1984, and retired at the end of the 1984 season.

=== Runcorn Highfield ===
One year later Prescott made a comeback with second division side Runcorn Highfield and made his debut on Saturday 31 March 1985 v Whitehaven and retired playing his last game on Sunday 9 April 1989 v Keighley, having made 85 appearances.

=== County honours ===
Prescott represented Lancashire on 11 occasions between 1970 and 1979.

Achievements
Preceded by Mal Reilly	Rugby league transfer record St Helens to Salford; 1972	Succeeded by Bill Ashurst
