= Frank Wilson (rugby, born 1944) =

Wales international rugby league footballer (1944–2024)

Personal information
- Born: 5 April 1944 Cardiff, Wales
- Died: 27 December 2024 (aged 80)

Playing information

Rugby union
Club
| Years | Team | Pld | T | G | FG | P |
|---|---|---|---|---|---|---|
| 1964–68 | Cardiff RFC | 37 | 22 | | | 66 |

Rugby league
- Position: Wing, Centre, Stand-off
Club
| Years | Team | Pld | T | G | FG | P |
|---|---|---|---|---|---|---|
| 1968–76 | St. Helens | 310 | 176 | 0 | 0 | 528 |
| 1976–77 | Workington Town | 5 | 1 | 0 | 0 | 3 |
| 1977–78 | Warrington | 29 | 9 | 0 | 0 | 27 |
| 1979–81 | Salford | 71 | 17 | 0 | 0 | 51 |
| 1981–82 | Cardiff City Blue Dragons | 20 | 7 | 0 | 0 | 21 |
| | Total | 435 | 210 | 0 | 0 | 630 |
Representative
| Years | Team | Pld | T | G | FG | P |
| 1968–76 | Wales | 14 | 1 | 0 | 0 | 3 |
| 1974–75 | Other Nationalities | 2 | 2 | 0 | 0 | 6 |

Frank Wilson (5 April 1944 – 27 December 2024) was a Welsh rugby union and professional rugby league footballer who played in the 1960s and 1970s. He played club level rugby union (RU) for Cardiff RFC, and representative level rugby league (RL) for Wales, and at club level for St. Helens, Workington Town, Warrington, Salford and Cardiff City (Bridgend) Blue Dragons, as a wing, centre or stand-off.

== Background ==
Wilson was born in Cardiff, Wales on 5 April 1944. He died on 27 December 2024, at the age of 80.

== Playing career ==
=== International honours ===
Wilson won caps for the Wales national rugby league team while at St. Helens in the 1975 Rugby League World Cup against France, England, Australia, England, Australia, New Zealand, and France.

=== World Club Challenge Final appearances ===
Wilson was a substitute in St. Helens 2–25 defeat by the 1975 NSWRFL season premiers, Eastern Suburbs Roosters in the unofficial 1976 World Club Challenge at Sydney Cricket Ground on Tuesday 29 June 1976.

=== Challenge Cup Final appearances ===
Frank Wilson played on the wing in St. Helens' 16-13 victory over Leeds in the 1972 Challenge Cup Final during the 1971–72 season at Wembley Stadium, London on Saturday 13 May 1972.

=== County Cup Final appearances ===
Wilson played on the wing, and scored 2-tries in St Helens' 30-2 victory over Oldham in the 1968 Lancashire Cup Final during the 1968–69 season at Central Park, Wigan on Friday 25 October 1968, and played on the wing in the 4–7 defeat by Leigh in the 1970 Lancashire Cup Final during the 1970–71 season at Station Road, Swinton on Saturday 28 November 1970.

=== BBC2 Floodlit Trophy Final appearances ===
Wilson played on the wing in St. Helens' 4-7 defeat by Wigan in the 1968–69 BBC2 Floodlit Trophy Final at Central Park, Wigan on Tuesday 17 December 1968, played on the wing in the 5–9 defeat by Leeds in the 1970 BBC2 Floodlit Trophy Final during the 1970–71 season at Headingley, Leeds on Tuesday 15 December 1970, played on the wing in the 8–2 victory over Rochdale Hornets in the 1971 BBC2 Floodlit Trophy Final during the 1971–72 season at Headingley, Leeds on Tuesday 14 December 1971, and played on the wing, and scored a try in the 22–2 victory over Dewsbury in the 1975 BBC2 Floodlit Trophy Final during the 1975–76 season at Knowsley Road, St. Helens on Tuesday 16 December 1975.

=== Player's No.6 Trophy Final appearances ===
Wilson played at centre in Warrington's 9–4 victory over Widnes in the 1977–78 Players No.6 Trophy Final during the 1977–78 season at Knowsley Road, St. Helens on Saturday 28 January 1978.

=== Career records ===
Wilson became one of less than twenty Welshmen to have scored more than 200-tries in their rugby league career.

== Coaching career ==
Wilson coached University of Manchester rugby league, and New Broughton Rangers.
