= Karalius =

- Lithuanian surname
- m.: Karalius
- f.: (unmarried): Karaliūtė
- f.: (married): Karalienė

Karalius is a surname. Notable people with the surname include:

- Tony Karalius (1943–2019), English rugby league footballer
- Vince Karalius (1932–2008), English rugby league footballer and coach
