= Ronnie Cowan (rugby) =

GB & Scotland international rugby union & league footballer

Personal information
- Full name: Ronnie C. Cowan
- Born: 26 November 1941 (age 83) Selkirk, Scottish Borders, Scotland

Playing information

Rugby union
- Position: Wing
Club
Years	Team	Pld	T	G	FG	P
	Selkirk RFC
	Barbarians
	Total	0	0	0	0	0
Representative
Years	Team	Pld	T	G	FG	P
1961–62	Scotland	5	0	0	0	0
1962	British Lions	1	1	0	0	3

Rugby league
- Position: Wing, Centre
Club
Years	Team	Pld	T	G	FG	P
1962–72	Leeds	232	119	0	0	357
1972–74	Hull FC	12	2	0	0	6
1974	Keighley
	Total	244	121	0	0	363
Representative
Years	Team	Pld	T	G	FG	P
1965	Other Nationalities
- Relatives: Stan Cowan (brother)

Ronald C. Cowan (born 26 November 1941) is a Scottish former rugby union and professional rugby league player who played in the 1960s and 1970s. He played international rugby union for Scotland and the British Lions, and at club level for Selkirk RFC, as a wing, In rugby league he played at club level for Leeds and Hull FC, as a wing or centre, and for Other Nationalities.

== Background ==
Cowan was born in Selkirk, Scotland. Cowan is the son of Jimmy Cowan, the rugby union and rugby league player for Hull F.C., and the younger brother of the rugby union and rugby league player Stan Cowan.

== Rugby union career ==
Cowan played for Selkirk RFC. He was capped five times for Scotland in 1961–62. He went on the 1962 tour of South Africa, Rhodesia and Kenya, aged 20, and played in ten games, scoring four tries. He won one cap, in the fourth test against South Africa, scoring a try.

== Rugby league career ==
Cowan transferred to Leeds during the 1962–63 season, and scored 119 tries for the club.

Cowan played on the wing in Leeds' 2–18 defeat by Wakefield Trinity in the 1964–65 Yorkshire Cup Final during the 1964–65 season at Fartown Ground, Huddersfield on Saturday 31 October 1964, and played at centre in the 23–7 victory over Featherstone Rovers in the 1970–71 Yorkshire Cup Final during the 1970–71 season at Odsal Stadium, Bradford on Saturday 21 November 1970.

Cowan played at centre in Leeds' 9–5 victory over St. Helens in the 1970 BBC2 Floodlit Trophy Final during the 1970–71 season at Headingley, Leeds on Tuesday 15 December 1970.

Cowan played at centre (replaced by substitute Les Dyl) in Leeds' 7–24 defeat by Leigh in the 1970–71 Challenge Cup Final during the 1970–71 season at Wembley Stadium, London on Saturday 15 May 1971, in front of a crowd of 85,514.

He transferred to Hull in 1972, before finishing his career at Keighley.

=== Representative ===
Cowan represented Other Nationalities while at Leeds, he was a substitute in the 2–19 defeat by St. Helens at Knowsley Road on 27 January 1965, to mark the switching-on of new floodlights.

== Notes ==
- Bath, Richard (ed.) The Scotland Rugby Miscellany (Vision Sports Publishing Ltd, 2007 ISBN 1-905326-24-6)
- Massie, Allan A Portrait of Scottish Rugby (Polygon, Edinburgh; ISBN 0-904919-84-6)
