= Mel Mason =

English rugby league footballer

Personal information
- Full name: Melvyn Mason
- Born: unknown

Playing information
- Position: Stand-off
Club
Years	Team	Pld	T	G	FG	P
1970–75	Featherstone Rovers	121	34	5	0	112
1975–77	Leeds	21	9	0	0	27
1977–83	Barrow	105	26	0	2	80
1983–84	Whitehaven	37	3	0	0	12
	Total	284	72	5	2	231
Representative
Years	Team	Pld	T	G	FG	P
1982	Cumbria	1	0	0	0	0

Mel Mason (birth unknown) is an English former professional rugby league footballer who played in the 1970s and 1980s. He played at representative level for Cumbria, and at club level for Featherstone Rovers, Leeds, Barrow and Whitehaven, as an occasional goal-kicking stand-off.

== Playing career ==
=== Featherstone Rovers ===
Mason was made his début for Featherstone Rovers in the defeat by Leeds during the 1970–71 season at Headingley, Leeds on Monday 5 October 1970.

Mason played stand-off in Featherstone Rovers' 33-14 victory over Bradford Northern in the 1973 Challenge Cup Final during the 1972–73 season at Wembley Stadium, London on Saturday 12 May 1973, in front of a crowd of 72,395.

=== Leeds ===
He was signed by Leeds for a fee of £6,000 during January 1975, but injuries limited his appearances at the club.

Mason played, and was man of the match winning the Harry Sunderland Trophy in Leeds' 26-11 victory over St. Helens in the 1974–75 Premiership Final during the 1974–75 season at Central Park, Wigan on Saturday 17 May 1975.

=== Later career ===
He was transferred to Barrow in 1977 where he represented Cumbria. Mason played in Barrow's 5-12 defeat by Warrington in the 1980–81 John Player Trophy Final during the 1980–81 season at Central Park, Wigan on Saturday 24 January 1981. He finished his playing career at Whitehaven.
