= 1964–65 Yorkshire Cup =

- Structure: Regional knockout championship
- Teams: 16
- Winners: Wakefield Trinity
- Runners-up: Leeds

The 1964–65 Yorkshire Cup was the fifty-seventh occasion on which the Yorkshire Cup competition had been held.

Wakefield Trinity winning the trophy by beating Leeds by the score of 18–2. The match was played at Fartown, Fartown Ground, Huddersfield, now in West Yorkshire. The attendance was 13,527 and receipts were £2,707.

This was Wakefield Trinity's fifth Yorkshire Cup final appearance in a period of nine years (which included four as cup winners and one as runner-up).

== Background ==
This season there were no junior/amateur clubs taking part, no new entrants and no "leavers" and so the total of entries remained the same at sixteen.

This in turn resulted in no byes in the first round.

== Competition and results ==
=== Round 1 ===
Involved 8 matches (with no byes) and 16 clubs

Game No	Fixture date	Home team	Score	Away team	Venue	Att	Rec	Notes	Ref
1	Fri 4 Sep 1964	Keighley	22–3	Doncaster	Lawkholme Lane				
2	Fri 4 Sep 1964	Leeds	25–8	Hunslet	Headingley				
3	Sat 5 Sep 1964	Bradford Northern	6–17	Huddersfield	Odsal	11,140			
4	Sat 5 Sep 1964	Bramley	2–7	Featherstone Rovers	Barley Mow				
5	Sat 5 Sep 1964	Castleford	8–16	Hull Kingston Rovers	Wheldon Road				
6	Sat 5 Sep 1964	Dwesbury	10–11	Wakefield Trinity	Crown Flatt				
7	Sat 5 Sep 1964	Halifax	32–14	York	Thrum Hall				
8	Sat 5 Sep 1964	Hull F.C.	35–9	Batley	Boulevard				

=== Round 2 - Quarter-finals ===
Involved 4 matches and 8 clubs

Game No	Fixture date	Home team	Score	Away team	Venue	Att	Rec	Notes	Ref
1	Mon 14 Sep 1964	Halifax	16–3	Hull F.C.	Thrum Hall				
2	Wed 16 Sep 1964	Featherstone Rovers	5–15	Wakefield Trinity	Post Office Road				
3	Wed 16 Sep 1964	Huddersfield	6–5	Hull Kingston Rovers	Fartown	4,447			
4	Thu 17 Sep 1964	Leeds	38–14	Keighley	Headingley				

=== Round 3 – Semi-finals ===
Involved 2 matches and 4 clubs

Game No	Fixture date	Home team	Score	Away team	Venue	Att	Rec	Notes	Ref
1	Wed 30 Sep 1964	Huddersfield	0–7	Wakefield Trinity	Fartown	9,371			
2	Mon 5 Oct 1964	Halifax	7–20	Leeds	Thrum Hall				

=== Final ===
Game No	Fixture date	Home team	Score	Away team	Venue	Att	Rec	Notes	Ref
	Saturday 31 October 1964	Wakefield Trinity	18–2	Leeds	Fartown	13,527	£2,707	(Note: The attendance is given as 13,754 by the official Huddersfield 1965 Yearbook but given as 13,527 by RUGBYLEAGUEproject and by the Rothmans Rugby League Yearbook of 1991-92 and 1990-91) (Note: Belle Vue is the home ground of Wakefield Trinity with a capacity of approximately 12,500. The record attendance was 37,906 on the 21 March 1936 in the Challenge Cup semi-final between Leeds and Huddersfield)	

==== Teams and scorers ====
Wakefield Trinity	№	Leeds
	teams	
Donald "Don" Metcalfe	1	Robin Dewhurst
Berwyn Jones	2	Ronnie Cowan
Tony Thomas	3	Andrew Broatch
Neil Fox	4	Dick Gemmell
Gert "Oupa" Coetzer	5	Geoff Wriglesworth
Harold Poynton	6	Mick Shoebottom
Ray Owen	7	Barry Seabourne
Edward "Ted" Campbell	8	Bill Drake
George Shepherd	9	Alan Lockwood
Don Vines	10	Leslie Chamberlain
Bob Haigh	11	Mick Clark
Derek Plumstead	12	Louis Neumann
Keith Holliday	13	John Sykes
Ken Traill	Coach	Roy Francis
18	score	2
7	HT	2
	Scorers	
	Tries	
Neil Fox (2)	T	
Berwyn Jones (2)	T	
	Goals	
Neil Fox (3)	G	Robin Dewhurst (1)
Referee		Dennis Davies (Manchester)

Scoring - Try = three (3) points - Goal = two (2) points - Drop goal = two (2) points

=== The road to success ===
First round
Bradford
Bramley
Wakefield Trinity
Leeds
Keighley
New Blackpool
York
Batley
Hull Kingston Rovers
Pontefract
Dewsbury
Huddersfield
Hull
Halifax
Hunslet
bye

Second round
Bradford
Leeds
Keighley
York
Hull Kingston Rovers
Huddersfield
Halifax
Hunslet

Semi-finals
Bradford
Keighley
Hull Kingston Rovers
Halifax

Final
Bradford	8
Hull Kingston Rovers	5

== See also ==
- 1964–65 Northern Rugby Football League season
- Rugby league county cups
