= Martin Murphy (rugby league) =

England rugby league footballer (1938–2026)

Personal information
- Full name: Martin Murphy
- Born: 1938 Leigh, Lancashire, England
- Died: 17 January 2026 (aged 87)

Playing information
- Position: Fullback
Club
Years	Team	Pld	T	G	FG	P
1966–1982	Oldham	462	52	0	0	156
1974	Newtown Jets
1982–1983	Rochdale Hornets	17
1985–1986	Mansfield Marksman	4	0	2	0	4
	Total	483	52	2	0	160
Representative
Years	Team	Pld	T	G	FG	P
≥1966–≤82	Lancashire	2
1975	England	1	1	0	0	3

Martin Murphy (1938 – 17 January 2026) was an English professional rugby league footballer who played in the 1960s, 1970s and 1980s. He played at representative level for England and Lancashire, and at club level for Oldham and Newtown Jets, as a fullback.

== Playing career ==
=== County Cup Final appearances ===
Murphy played fullback in Oldham's 2-30 defeat by St. Helens in the 1968 Lancashire Cup Final during the 1968–69 season at Central Park, Wigan on Friday 25 October 1968.

=== International honours ===
Murphy won a cap for England while at Oldham against France scoring the match-winning try in the 11-9 European Championship win in Perpignan in January 1975.

== Honoured at Oldham ==
Murphy is an Oldham Hall Of Fame Inductee.
