= Tony Fisher (rugby) =

Welsh RL coach and former GB & Wales international rugby league footballer

Personal information
- Full name: Anthony Fisher
- Born: 1944 (age 80–81); Swansea, Glamorgan, Wales

Playing information

Rugby union
- Position: Hooker
Club
Years	Team	Pld	T	G	FG	P
19??–??	Swansea

Rugby league
- Position: Hooker
Club
Years	Team	Pld	T	G	FG	P
1964–70	Bradford Northern
1970–75	Leeds	141	10	0	1	32
1975–78	Castleford	45	1	0	0	3
1978–79	Bradford Northern	19	0	0	1	1
	Total	205	11	0	2	36
Representative
Years	Team	Pld	T	G	FG	P
1968–78	Wales	16	1	0	0	3
1970–78	Great Britain	11	1	0	0	3
1974	Other Nationalities	1	0	0	0	0

Coaching information
Club
Years	Team	Gms	W	D	L	W%
1988–89	Bramley
1990–91	Keighley
1993–94	Doncaster RLFC
1995–96	Dewsbury
1996–97	Doncaster RLFC
	Total	0	0	0	0
Representative
Years	Team	Gms	W	D	L	W%
1995	South Africa	3	0	0	3	0
- Relatives: Idwal Fisher (brother)

Anthony Fisher (born c. 1944), also known by the nickname of "Fishcake", is a Welsh former rugby union, and professional rugby league footballer who played in the 1960s and 1970s, and coached rugby league in the 1980s and 1990s. He played club level rugby union (RU) for Swansea RFC, as a hooker, and representative level rugby league (RL) for Great Britain and Wales, and at club level for Bradford Northern (two spells), Leeds and Castleford, as a prop, or hooker, and coached representative level rugby league (RL) for South Africa, and at club level for Bramley, Keighley, Doncaster and Dewsbury.

== Background ==
Tony Fisher was born in Swansea, Glamorgan, Wales.

== Playing career ==
=== International honours ===
Fisher won caps for Wales (RL) while at Bradford Northern in 1970 against England, while at Leeds in the 1975 Rugby League World Cup against France, England, Australia, New Zealand, while at Castleford in the 1975 Rugby League World Cup against England, Australia, and New Zealand, and in 1977 against England and France, and while at Bradford Northern in 1978 against Australia, and won caps for Great Britain (RL) while at Bradford/Leeds in 1970 against Australia (2 matches), New Zealand (3 matches), and Australia (2 matches), while at Leeds in 1971 against France (2 matches), and in 1978 against Australia (2 matches).

=== Challenge Cup Final appearances ===
Tony Fisher played hooker in Leeds' 7–24 defeat by Leigh in the 1971 Challenge Cup Final during the 1970–71 season at Wembley Stadium, London on Saturday 15 May 1971, in front of a crowd of 85,514, and played hooker in the 13–16 defeat by St. Helens in the 1972 Challenge Cup Final during the 1971–72 season at Wembley Stadium, London on Saturday 13 May 1972, in front of a crowd of 89,495.

=== County Cup Final appearances ===
Tony Fisher appeared as a substitute (replacing prop Terry Clawson) in Leeds' 36–9 victory over Dewsbury in the 1972 Yorkshire Cup Final during the 1972–73 season at Odsal Stadium, Bradford on Saturday 7 October 1972, played at prop in Castleford's 17–7 victory over Featherstone Rovers in the 1977 Yorkshire Cup Final during the 1977–78 season at Headingley, Leeds on Saturday 15 October 1977, and played hooker in Bradford Northern's 18–8 victory over York in the 1978 Yorkshire Cup Final during the 1978–79 season at Headingley, Leeds on Saturday 28 October 1978.

=== BBC2 Floodlit Trophy Final appearances ===
Tony Fisher played hooker in Leeds' 9–5 victory over St. Helens in the 1970 BBC2 Floodlit Trophy Final during the 1970–71 season at Headingley, Leeds on Tuesday 15 December 1970.

=== Player's No.6 Trophy Final appearances ===
Tony Fisher played hooker in Leeds' 12–7 victory over Salford in the 1972–73 Player's No.6 Trophy Final during the 1972–73 season at Fartown Ground, Huddersfield on Saturday 24 March 1973.

== Genealogical information ==
Tony Fisher is the younger brother of the rugby union, and rugby league footballer; Idwal Fisher.
