= Sean Casey (rugby league) =

Ireland international rugby league footballer

Personal information
- Full name: Sean Casey
- Born: 9 December 1971 (age 54) St Helens, Merseyside, England

Playing information
- Position: Wing, Centre, Hooker, Second-row, Loose forward
Club
| Years | Team | Pld | T | G | FG | P |
|---|---|---|---|---|---|---|
| 1992–95 | St. Helens | 14 | 4 | 0 | 0 | 16 |
| 1995–96 | Whitehaven | 37 | 5 | 17 | 0 | 54 |
| 1997–00 | Swinton Lions | 103 | 38 | 5 | 9 | 171 |
| | Total | 154 | 47 | 22 | 9 | 241 |

Sean Casey (born 9 December 1971) is an English former professional rugby league footballer who played in the 1990s and 2000s, and coached in the 2000s. He played at club level for Blackbrook A.R.L.F.C., St. Helens, Whitehaven, and Swinton Lions, as a wing, centre, hooker, second-row, or loose forward, and coached at St. Helens (Assistant Academy Coach Under-21s c. 2003).
