= 1970–71 Lancashire Cup =

- Structure: Regional knockout championship
- Teams: 16
- Winners: Leigh
- Runners-up: St. Helens

The 1970–71 Lancashire Cup was the fifty-eighth staging of the tournament. Leigh won the trophy by beating St. Helens by the score of 7–4 in the final. The match was played at Station Road, Pendlebury, (historically in the county of Lancashire). The attendance was 10,776 and receipts were £3,136.

== Background ==
The total number of teams entering the competition remained the same at a total of 16. Once again two junior (or amateur) clubs were invited St Helens Amateurs and this year, Whitehaven Amateurs.
The same fixture format was retained, and due to the number of participating clubs, resulted in a full fixture list with no byes or “blank” or “dummy” fixtures.

== Competition and results ==
=== Round 1 ===
Involved 8 matches (with no bye or “blank” fixture) and 16 clubs

Game No	Fixture date	Home team	Score	Away team	Venue	Att	Rec	Notes	Ref
1	Fri 28-08-1970	Rochdale Hornets	14-11	Whitehaven	Athletic Grounds				
2	Fri 28-08-1970	Warrington	9-21	Leigh	Wilderspool				
3	Sat 29-08-1970	Blackpool Borough	10-10	Widnes	Borough Park				
4	Sat 29-08-1970	Huyton	3-30	St. Helens	Alt Park, Huyton	2,121			
5	Sat 29-08-1970	Oldham	12-35	Salford	Watersheddings				
6	Sat 29-08-1970	Swinton	51-21	St Helens Amateurs	Station Road			1	
7	Sat 29-08-1970	Wigan	32-2	Barrow	Central Park				
8	Sun 30-08-1970	Workington Town	49-7	Whitehaven Amateurs	Derwent Park			2	

=== Round 1 replays ===
Involved 1 match and 2 clubs

Game No	Fixture date	Home team	Score	Away team	Venue	Att	Rec	Notes	Ref
1	Thu 03-09-1970	Widnes	41-6	Blackpool Borough	Naughton Park				

=== Round 2 - Quarter-finals ===
Involved 4 matches (with no bye) and 8 clubs

Game No	Fixture date	Home team	Score	Away team	Venue	Att	Rec	Notes	Ref
1	Mon 07-09-1970	Widnes	32-5	Rochdale Hornets	Naughton Park				
2	Sun 13-09-1970	Salford	12-12	Wigan	The Willows				
3	Wed 16-09-1970	Leigh	12-8	Workington Town	Hilton Park				
4	Thu 17-09-1970	St. Helens	20-7	Swinton	Knowsley Road	7,500			

=== Round 2 – replays ===
Involved 1 match and 2 clubs

Game No	Fixture date	Home team	Score	Away team	Venue	Att	Rec	Notes	Ref
1	Sun 20-09-1970	Wigan	32-6	Salford	Central Park				

=== Round 3 – Semi-finals ===
Involved 2 matches and 4 clubs

Game No	Fixture date	Home team	Score	Away team	Venue	Att	Rec	Notes	Ref
1	Sun 04-10-1970	Widnes	10-13	Leigh	Naughton Park				
2	Sat 10-10-1970	Wigan	0-23	St. Helens	Central Park	23,508			

=== Final ===
Game No	Fixture date	Home team	Score	Away team	Venue	Att	Rec	Notes	Ref
	Saturday 28 November 1970	Leigh	7-4	St. Helens	Station Road	10,776	£3,136	HT 0-0	

==== Teams and scorers ====
Leigh	No.	St. Helens
	teams	
Stuart Ferguson	1	Frank Barrow
Rod Tickle	2	Les Jones
Les Chisnall	3	Billy Benyon
Mick Collins	4	Johnny Walsh
Joseph Walsh	5	Frank Wilson
David Eckersley	6	Frank Myler
Alex Murphy	7	Alan Whittle
Dave Chisnall	8	Albert Halsall
Kevin Ashcroft	9	Tony Karalius
Derek Watts	10	Graham Rees
Paul Grimes	11	John Mantle
Geoffrey Clarkson	12	Eric Chisnall
Mick Mooney	13	Kel Coslett
Thomas "Tom" /"Tommy" Canning (for Rod Tickle)	14	Jeff Heaton (not used)
	15	Eric Prescott (for Graham Rees)
7	score	4
0	HT	0
	Scorers	
	Tries	
David Eckersley (1)	T	
	Goals	
Stuart Ferguson (2)	G	Kel Coslett (2)
Referee		W H (Billy) Thompson (Huddersfield)
		-

Scoring - Try = three (3) points - Goal = two (2) points - Drop goal = two (2) points

=== The road to success ===
First round
Blackpool Borough	10-6
Widnes	10-41
Rochdale Hornets	14
Whitehaven	11
Warrington	9
Leigh	21
Workington Town	49
Whitehaven Amateurs	7
Oldham	12
Salford	35
Wigan	32
Barrow	2
Huyton	3
St. Helens	30
Swinton	51
St Helens Amateurs	21

Second round
Widnes	32
Rochdale Hornets	5
Leigh	12
Workington Town	8
Salford	12-6
Wigan	12-32
St. Helens	20
Swinton	7

Semi-finals
Widnes	10
Leigh	13
Wigan	0
St. Helens	23

Final
Leigh	7
St. Helens	4

== Notes and comments ==
1 * St Helens Amateurs were a junior (or amateur) club from St Helens
2 * Whitehaven Amateurs are a junior (or amateur) club from Whitehaven
3 * Station Road was the home ground of Swinton from 1929 to 1932 and at its peak was one of the finest rugby league grounds in the country and it boasted a capacity of 60,000. The actual record attendance was for the Challenge Cup semi-final on 7 April 1951 when 44,621 watched Wigan beat Warrington 3-2

== See also ==
- British rugby league system
- 1970–71 Northern Rugby Football League season
- Rugby league county cups
- List of defunct rugby league clubs
