= George Shepherd =

George Shepherd may refer to:

- George Shepherd (hurdler) (1938–2022), Canadian Olympic hurdler
- George Shepherd (rugby league), rugby league footballer who played in the 1960s
- George Shepherd (artist) (1784–1862), British draughtsman and watercolour painter
- George Shepherd, 1st Baron Shepherd (1881–1954), British Labour politician
