= 1971–72 Challenge Cup =

Rugby league competition

- Highest attendance: 89,495
- Broadcast partners: BBC
- Winners: St. Helens
- Runners-up: Leeds
- Lance Todd Trophy: Kel Coslett

The 1971–72 Challenge Cup was the 71st staging of rugby league's oldest knockout competition, the Challenge Cup. The final was contested by St. Helens and Leeds at Wembley.

== First round ==
Date	Team one	Team two	Score
29 Jan	Bramley	Pilkington Recs	19-5
29 Jan	Dewsbury Celtic	Featherstone Rovers	2-34
29 Jan	Doncaster	Wakefield Trinity	3-5
29 Jan	Huyton	Halifax	4-7
29 Jan	Leeds	Widnes	17-8
29 Jan	Leigh	Workington Town	19-4
29 Jan	Oldham	St Helens	6-8
29 Jan	Swinton	Blackpool	33-12
29 Jan	Whitehaven	Castleford	0-17
30 Jan	Barrow	Hunslet	24-6
30 Jan	Bradford Northern	Keighley	17-2
30 Jan	Dewsbury	Huddersfield	4-17
30 Jan	Salford	Wigan	12-16
30 Jan	Warrington	Batley	30-7
30 Jan	York	Rochdale Hornets	13-5
03 Feb	Hull FC	Hull Kingston Rovers	7-5

== Second round ==
Date	Team one	Team two	Score
19 Feb	Castleford	Warrington	8-8
19 Feb	Halifax	Featherstone Rovers	11-5
20 Feb	Barrow	York	9-9
20 Feb	Bramley	Bradford Northern	8-5
20 Feb	Hull FC	Leeds	5-16
20 Feb	Leigh	Swinton	3-4
20 Feb	St Helens	Huddersfield	32-9
20 Feb	Wakefield Trinity	Wigan	6-5
23 Feb - replay	Warrington	Castleford	11-5
23 Feb - replay	York	Barrow	15-3

== Quarter-finals ==
Date	Team one	Team two	Score
04 Mar	Bramley	Warrington	7-14
04 Mar	York	St Helens	5-32
05 Mar	Halifax	Swinton	9-8
05 Mar	Leeds	Wakefield Trinity	11-5

== Semi-finals ==
Date	Team one	Team two	Score
08 Apr	Leeds	Halifax	16-3
15 Apr	St Helens	Warrington	10-10
19 Apr - replay	St Helens	Warrington	10-6

== Final ==
The final was played on Saturday 13 May 1972, in front of a crowd of 89,495. After leading 12-6 at half time, St Helens beat Leeds 16-13.

The winner of the Lance Todd Trophy was Saints’ Kel Coslett.

St Helens scorers were Les Jones (1 try), Graham Rees (1 try), and Kel Coslett (5 goals).

This was St Helens’ fourth Cup final win in eight Final appearances.

13 May 1972

St Helens	16 – 13	Leeds
Try Rees, Jones; Goals Coslett (4) DG Coslett		Try Cookson; Goals Clawson (5)

Wembley, London
Attendance: 89,495
Referee: Eric Lawrinson (Warrington)
Player of the Match: Kel Coslett

1	Geoff Pimblett
2	Les Jones
3	Billy Benyon
4	Johnny Walsh
5	Frank Wilson
6	Ken Kelly
7	Jeff Heaton
8	Graham Rees
9	Les Greenall
10	John Stephens
11	John Mantle
12	Eric Chisnall
13	Kel Coslett (c)
Substitutes:
14	Alan Whittle (unused)
15	Kelvin Earl (unused)
Coach:
Jim Challinor

1	John Holmes
2	Alan Smith
3	Syd Hynes	Substituted off
4	Les Dyl
5	John Atkinson
6	Alan Hardisty (c)
7	Keith Hepworth
8	Terry Clawson
9	Tony Fisher
10	Bill Ramsey
11	Bob Haigh
12	Phil Cookson
13	Ray Batten
Substitutes:
14	John Langley	Substituted in
15	Graham Eccles (unused)
Coach:
Derek Turner
