= Mike Elliott (rugby) =

Welsh rugby league footballer

Personal information
- Full name: Michael Elliott
- Born: c. 1945 (age 80–81) Cardiff district, Wales

Playing information
- Position: Wing, Centre
Club
Years	Team	Pld	T	G	FG	P
1962–79	Oldham	446	153			459

Michael Elliott (born c. 1945) is a Welsh former rugby union, and professional rugby league footballer who played in the 1960s and 1970s who played for Oldham as a three-quarter back. He is an Oldham Hall Of Fame Inductee.

== Playing career ==
=== County Cup Final appearances ===
Mike Elliott played on the wing in Oldham's defeat by St. Helens in the 1968 Lancashire Cup Final during the 1968–69 season at Central Park, Wigan on Friday 25 October 1968.
