= Derek Plumstead =

English rugby league footballer

Personal information
- Full name: Derek Plumstead
- Born: second ¼ 1944 (age 80–81); Lower Agbrigg district, Wakefield, England

Playing information
- Position: Second-row
Club
| Years | Team | Pld | T | G | FG | P |
|---|---|---|---|---|---|---|
| 1964–65/66 | Wakefield Trinity | 49 | 2 | 0 | 0 | 6 |

Derek Plumstead (birth registered second ¼ 1944) is an English former professional rugby league footballer who played in the 1960s. He played at club level for Wakefield Trinity, as a second-row.

== Background ==
Derek Plumstead's birth was registered in Lower Agbrigg district, Wakefield, West Riding of Yorkshire, England, and he was a pupil at Hall Green School, Wakefield.

== Playing career ==
=== County Cup Final appearances ===
Derek Plumstead played at second-row in Wakefield Trinity's 18-2 victory over Leeds in the 1964 Yorkshire Cup Final during the 1964–65 season at Fartown Ground, Huddersfield on Saturday 31 October 1964.
