= 1970–71 Challenge Cup =

Rugby league competition

- Highest attendance: 85,514
- Broadcast partners: BBC
- Winners: Leigh
- Runners-up: Leeds
- Lance Todd Trophy: Alex Murphy

The 1970–71 Challenge Cup was the 70th staging of rugby league's oldest knockout competition, the Challenge Cup.

The final was contested by Leeds and Leigh at Wembley.

== First round ==
Date	Team one	Team two	Score
23 Jan	Barrow	Widnes	11-15
23 Jan	Batley	Wigan	4-13
23 Jan	Blackpool	Huddersfield	7-8
23 Jan	Leeds	Oldham	49-2
23 Jan	Swinton	Huyton	13-2
23 Jan	Thames Board Mills	Hunslet	5-49
23 Jan	Warrington	Rochdale Hornets	13-7
23 Jan	Whitehaven	Castleford	0-15
23 Jan	Workington Town	St Helens	6-8
24 Jan	Hull BOCM	Dewsbury	3-25
24 Jan	Bramley	Doncaster	6-5
24 Jan	Halifax	Featherstone Rovers	13-18
24 Jan	Keighley	Hull Kingston Rovers	9-9
24 Jan	Leigh	Bradford Northern	9-2
24 Jan	Salford	Wakefield Trinity	6-6
24 Jan	York	Hull FC	0-2
27 Jan -replay	Hull Kingston Rovers	Keighley	11-18
27 Jan - replay	Wakefield Trinity	Salford	8-15

== Second round ==
Date	Team one	Team two	Score
19 Feb	Castleford	Keighley	9-6
20 Feb	Leeds	St Helens	4-0
21 Feb	Dewsbury	Bramley	13-17
21 Feb	Featherstone Rovers	Hull FC	7-7
21 Feb	Hunslet	Huddersfield	0-16
21 Feb	Salford	Warrington	20-9
21 Feb	Swinton	Wigan	8-2
21 Feb	Widnes	Leigh	11-14
24 Feb -replay	Hull FC	Featherstone Rovers	12-8

== Quarter-finals ==
Date	Team one	Team two	Score
06 Mar	Bramley	Leeds	0-14
06 Mar	Castleford	Salford	9-8
07 Mar	Huddersfield	Swinton	11-8
07 Mar	Leigh	Hull FC	8-4

== Semi-finals ==
Date	Team one	Team two	Score
27 Mar	Leeds	Castleford	19-8
03 Apr	Leigh	Huddersfield	10-4

== Final ==
The final was played on Saturday 15 May 1971, where Leigh beat Leeds 24-7 at Wembley in front of a crowd of 85,514.

The winner of the Lance Todd Trophy was Leigh's captain-coach, Alex Murphy who was stretchered off after a clash with Leeds player, Syd Hynes. For his part in the "clash", Hynes was sent off, and became the first player to be sent-off in a Challenge Cup final after the headbutt on Leigh's Murphy.

This was Leigh's second Cup final win in two final appearances. It was their last appearance in a Challenge Cup final until 2023.

15 May 1971

Leigh	24 – 7	Leeds
Try Dorrington, Eckersley; Goals Ferguson (5); DG Fiddler, Murphy (2), Eckersley		Try Wainwright; Goals Holmes (2)

Wembley, London
Attendance: 85,514
Referee: Billy Thompson
Player of the Match: Alex Murphy

1	David Eckersley
2	Stuart Ferguson
3	Stan Dorrington
4	Mick Collins
5	Joseph Walsh
6	Tony Barrow
7	Alex Murphy (c)	Substituted off
8	Derek Watts
9	Kevin Ashcroft
10	Jimmy Fiddler
11	Paul Grimes
12	Geoffrey Clarkson
13	Peter Smethurst
Substitutes:
14	Les Chisnall	Substituted on
15	Roy Lester (unused)
Coach:
Alex Murphy

1	John Holmes
2	John Langley
3	Syd Hynes (c) (red card)
4	Ronnie Cowan	Substituted off
5	John Atkinson
6	Tony Wainwright
7	Barry Seabourne
8	John Burke
9	Tony Fisher
10	Ted Barnard
11	David Hick
12	Bob Haigh
13	Bill Ramsey
Substitutes:
14	Les Dyl	Substituted on
15	Phil Cookson (unused)
Coach:
Derek Turner
