= Stan Cowan =

Scottish rugby footballer

Personal information
- Full name: Stanley Cowan
- Born: 22 December 1931 Selkirk, Scottish Borders
- Died: 8 February 2015 (aged 83)

Playing information

Rugby union
Club
| Years | Team | Pld | T | G | FG | P |
|---|---|---|---|---|---|---|
| ≤1954–54 | Selkirk RFC |
Representative
| Years | Team | Pld | T | G | FG | P |
| ≤1954–≤54 | South of Scotland |

Rugby league
- Position: Wing, Centre
Club
| Years | Team | Pld | T | G | FG | P |
|---|---|---|---|---|---|---|
| 1954–66 | Hull FC | 163 | 66 | 0 | 0 | 198 |
- Relatives: Ronnie Cowan (brother)

Stanley Cowan (22 December 1931 – 8 February 2015) was a Scottish rugby union and professional rugby league player who played in the 1950s and 1960s. He played representative rugby union for South of Scotland, including against the New Zealand All Blacks and at club level for Selkirk RFC, and club level rugby league for Hull FC, as a wing or centre.

== Background ==
Cowan died in February 2015 after a short illness. He was 83.

== Playing career ==
=== Challenge Cup Final appearances ===
Cowan played on the wing in Hull FC's 13-30 defeat by Wigan in the 1959 Challenge Cup Final during the 1958–59 season at Wembley Stadium, London on Saturday 9 May 1959, in front of a crowd of 79,811, and played at centre in the 5-38 defeat by Wakefield Trinity in the 1960 Challenge Cup Final during the 1959–60 season at Wembley Stadium, London on Saturday 14 May 1960, in front of a crowd of 79,773.

=== County Cup Final appearances ===
Cowan played on the wing in Hull FC's 14-15 defeat by Featherstone Rovers in the 1959 Yorkshire Cup Final at Headingley, Leeds on Saturday 31 October 1959, in front of a crowd of 23,983.

== Personal life ==
Cowan was the son of the rugby union, and rugby league footballer for Hull F.C.; James Cowan, and the older brother of the rugby union and rugby league footballer; Ronnie Cowan.
