= Colin Whitfield =

English rugby league footballer and coach

Personal information
- Full name: Colin Whitfield
- Born: 20 September 1960 (age 65) England

Playing information
- Position: Fullback, Wing, Centre
Club
Years	Team	Pld	T	G	FG	P
1979–81	Salford	79+10	11	101	4	239
1981–85	Wigan	144+5	46	379	13	937
1986–89	Halifax	128+6	48	303	7	805
1987	Canterbury-Bankstown	12	0	11	0	22
1990–92	Rochdale Hornets	77	7	110	5	253
	Total	461	112	904	29	2256
Representative
Years	Team	Pld	T	G	FG	P
1980–87	Lancashire	5	0	11	0	22
1981	Great Britain U24	1	0	0	0	0

Coaching information
Club
Years	Team	Gms	W	D	L	W%
1998–00	Widnes	51	33	0	18	65
- Relatives: Robin Whitfield (brother); Eric Prescott (cousin)

Colin Whitfield (born 20 September 1960) is an English former professional rugby league footballer who played in the 1980s and 1990s, and coached in the 1990s. He played at club level for Salford, Wigan, Halifax, Canterbury-Bankstown and the Rochdale Hornets, as a fullback, wing, or centre, and coached at club level for Widnes.

== Playing career ==
=== Wigan ===
Whitfield made his debut for Wigan in the 20-24 defeat by York at Clarence Street, York on Sunday 8 November 1981. He scored his first try for Wigan in the 15-18 defeat by Barrow at Central Park, Wigan on Sunday 3 January 1982. He scored his last try for Wigan in the 38-14 victory over St. Helens at Central Park, Wigan on Thursday 26 December 1985, and he played his last match for Wigan in the 38-14 victory over St. Helens at Central Park on Thursday 26 December 1985.

Whitfield played left-centre, and scored 4 goals and 1 drop goal in Wigan's 15-4 victory over Leeds in the 1982–83 John Player Trophy Final during the 1982–83 season at Elland Road, Leeds on Saturday 22 January 1983.

Whitfield played left-centre, and scored 3-goals in Wigan's 18-26 defeat by St. Helens in the 1984 Lancashire Cup Final during the 1984–85 season at Central Park, Wigan, on Sunday 28 October 1984, and played left wing, in the 34-8 victory over Warrington in the 1985 Lancashire Cup Final during the 1985–86 season at Knowsley Road, St. Helens, on Sunday 13 October 1985,

Whitfield played left wing, in Wigan's 14-8 victory over New Zealand in the 1985 New Zealand rugby league tour of Great Britain and France match at Central Park, Wigan on Sunday 6 October 1985.

=== Halifax ===
Whitfield was signed from Wigan by Halifax in January 1986, who paid a then club record fee of £25,000 (based on increases in average earnings, this would be approximately £95,910 in 2014). He played in the last 12 League matches of the 1985–86 season scoring 2-tries and 23-goals as Halifax pipped Wigan to the Championship by 1-point.

Whitfield played right-centre, and scored 3-goals in Halifax's 19-18 victory over St. Helens in the 1987 Challenge Cup final during the 1986–87 season at Wembley Stadium, London on Saturday 2 May 1987, and played left wing, and scored 2- goals in the 12-32 defeat by Wigan in the 1988 Challenge Cup Final during the 1987–88 season at Wembley on Saturday 30 April 1988.

Whitfield played fullback in Halifax' 12-24 defeat by Wigan in the 1989–90 Regal Trophy Final during the 1989–90 season at Headingley, Leeds on Saturday 13 January 1990.

=== Rochdale Hornets ===
Whitfield played, and scored a goal in Rochdale Hornets' 14-24 defeat by St. Helens in the 1991 Lancashire Cup Final during the 1991–92 season at Wilderspool Stadium, Warrington, on Sunday 20 October 1991.
