= Geoff Wriglesworth =

GB international rugby league footballer

Personal information
- Full name: Geoffrey W. Wriglesworth
- Born: September 1943 (age 81–82); York district, England

Playing information
- Position: Wing, Centre
Club
Years	Team	Pld	T	G	FG	P
1961–67	Leeds	174	98	0	0	294
1967–68	Bradford Northern	48	16	0	0	48
≤1972–72	Hull Kingston Rovers	51	17	0	0	51
1972–76/77	Wakefield Trinity	62	19	0	0	57
–76	York
	Total	335	150	0	0	450
Representative
Years	Team	Pld	T	G	FG	P
1964–68	Yorkshire	8	6	0	0	18
1965–66	Great Britain	5	0	0	0	0

Geoffrey "Geoff" W. Wriglesworth (born in September 1943) is an English former professional rugby league footballer who played in the 1960s and 1970s. He played at representative level for Great Britain, and at club level for Leeds, Bradford Northern, Hull Kingston Rovers, Wakefield Trinity, and York, as a wing, or centre.

== Background ==
Geoff Wriglesworth's birth was registered in York, Yorkshire.

== Playing career ==
=== Club career ===
Wriglesworth joined Leeds in 1961 from amateur club Heworth. He played left wing in Leeds' 2–18 defeat by Wakefield Trinity in the 1964 Yorkshire Cup Final during the 1964–65 season at Fartown Ground, Huddersfield on Saturday 31 October 1964.

Geoff Wriglesworth made his début for Wakefield Trinity against Swinton at Station Road, Swinton on Monday 9 October 1972.

=== International honours ===
Geoff Wriglesworth won caps for Great Britain while at Leeds in 1965 against New Zealand, and in 1966 against Australia (2 matches), and New Zealand (2 matches).
