= Idwal Fisher =

Wales international rugby league & union footballer

Personal information
- Full name: Idwal Fisher
- Born: 3 February 1935 Swansea district, Wales
- Died: 5 January 2012 (aged 76) Lochmaben, Scotland

Playing information

Rugby union
- Position: Back row
Club
Years	Team	Pld	T	G	FG	P
1960–62	Swansea	51

Rugby league
- Position: Second-row
Club
Years	Team	Pld	T	G	FG	P
1962–63	Warrington	47	5	0	0	15
1964–65	Bradford Northern	17	1	0	0	3
	Total	64	6	0	0	18
Representative
Years	Team	Pld	T	G	FG	P
1963	Wales	1	0	0	0	0
- Relatives: Tony Fisher (brother)

Idwal Fisher (3 February 1935 – 5 January 2012) was a Welsh rugby union and professional rugby league footballer who played in the 1960s. He played club level rugby union (RU) for Swansea RFC, in the back row, and representative level rugby league (RL) for Wales, and at club level for both Warrington, and Bradford Northern, as a second-row.

== Background ==
Idwal Fisher's birth was registered in Swansea district, and he died aged 76 in Lochmaben, Scotland, having retired to live near his daughter in Lockerbie.

== Playing career ==
=== Club career ===
Idwal Fisher made his début for Warrington on Saturday 24 March 1962, and he played his last match for Warrington on Saturday 14 December 1963.

After one season at Bradford Northern, he was transferred to Bramley in 1965.

=== International honours ===
Idwal Fisher won a cap for Wales (RL) while at Warrington in 1963.

== Personal life ==
Idwal Fisher was the older brother of the rugby union, and rugby league footballer; Tony Fisher.
