= Les Greenall =

English rugby league footballer

Personal information
- Full name: Leslie Greenall
- Born: 11 April 1944 (age 80); Haydock, Lancashire, England

Playing information
- Position: Hooker
Club
Years	Team	Pld	T	G	FG	P
1963–65	St. Helens	2	0	0	0	0
1966–67	Wigan	3	1	0	0	3
1967–70	Rochdale Hornets
1970–73	St. Helens	16	4	0	0	12
	Total	21	5	0	0	15

Leslie "Les" Greenall (born 11 April 1944) is an English former professional rugby league footballer who played in the 1960s and 1970s. He played at club level for St. Helens (two spells), Wigan, and Rochdale Hornets as a hooker. Les supported St. Helens growing up.

== Background ==
Les Greenall was born in Haydock, Lancashire, England.

== Playing career ==
=== Challenge Cup Final appearances ===
Les Greenall played hooker in St. Helens' 16-13 victory over Leeds in the 1972 Challenge Cup Final during the 1971-72 season at Wembley Stadium, London on Saturday 13 May 1972.

=== Club career ===
In 1965, Les Greenall was signed aged 21 by Wigan from St. Helens for £750 (based on increases in average earnings, this would be approximately £24,690 in 2013).

== Outside of Rugby League ==
As of 2011, Les Greenall is a warden at St. Mark's Church, Haydock.
