= Eric Chisnall =

Great Britain and England international rugby league footballer (born 1946)

Personal information
- Born: 5 July 1946 (age 80) St. Helens, England

Playing information
- Position: Prop, Second-row
Club
Years	Team	Pld	T	G	FG	P
1966–81	St. Helens	523	70	0	0	210
1981–82	Leigh	26	2	0	0	6
	Total	549	72	0	0	216
Representative
Years	Team	Pld	T	G	FG	P
1968–72	Lancashire	4	0	0	0	0
1974	Great Britain	2	1	0	0	3
1975	England	5	0	0	0	0
- Relatives: Dave Chisnall (brother)

Eric Chisnall (born 5 July 1946) is an English former professional rugby league footballer who played in the 1960s, 1970s and 1980. He played at representative level for Great Britain and England, and at club level for St Helens and Leigh, as a prop or second-row.

== Background ==
Chisnall was born in St. Helens, Lancashire, England.

== Playing career ==
=== World Club Challenge Final appearances ===
Chisnall played at second-row in St. Helens 2–25 defeat by the 1975 NSWRFL season premiers, Eastern Suburbs Roosters in the unofficial 1976 World Club Challenge at Sydney Cricket Ground on Tuesday 29 June 1976.

=== Challenge Cup Final appearances ===
Chisnall played at second-row in St. Helens' 16–13 victory over Leeds in the 1972 Challenge Cup Final during the 1971–72 season at Wembley Stadium, London on Saturday 13 May 1972, and played at second-row in the 20–5 victory over Widnes in the 1976 Challenge Cup Final during the 1975–76 season at Wembley Stadium, London on Saturday 8 May 1976.

=== County Cup Final appearances ===
Chisnall played at second-row and scored a try in St. Helens' 13–10 victory over Warrington in the 1967 Lancashire Cup Final replay during the 1967–68 season at Station Road, Swinton on Saturday 2 December 1967 (he replaced John Mantle, who had played in the previous drawn final), played at second-row, and scored a try in the 30–2 victory over Oldham in the 1968 Lancashire Cup Final during the 1968–69 season at Central Park, Wigan on Friday 25 October 1968, and played at prop in Leigh's 7–4 victory over St. Helens in the 1970 Lancashire Cup Final during the 1970–71 season at Station Road, Swinton on Saturday 28 November 1970.

=== BBC2 Floodlit Trophy Final appearances ===
Chisnall was a substitute in St. Helens' 4–7 defeat by Wigan in the 1968 BBC2 Floodlit Trophy Final during the 1968–69 season at Central Park, Wigan on Tuesday 17 December 1968, played at prop in the 5–9 defeat by Leeds in the 1970 BBC2 Floodlit Trophy Final during the 1970–71 season at Headingley, Leeds on Tuesday 15 December 1970, played at prop in the 8–2 victory over Rochdale Hornets in the 1971 BBC2 Floodlit Trophy Final during the 1971–72 season at Headingley, Leeds on Tuesday 14 December 1971, and played at second-row in the 22–2 victory over Dewsbury in the 1975 BBC2 Floodlit Trophy Final during the 1975–76 season at Knowsley Road, St. Helens on Tuesday 16 December 1975.

=== International honours ===
Chisnall won caps for England while at St. Helens in 1975 against France, in the 1975 Rugby League World Cup against Wales, and New Zealand, and Australia (sub), in 1975 against Papua New Guinea (non-test), and won caps for Great Britain while at St. Helens in 1974 against Australia (2 matches), and New Zealand (2 matches).

== Honoured at St. Helens ==
Chisnall is a St Helens R.F.C. Hall of Fame inductee.

== Personal life ==
Chisnall is the younger brother of the rugby league footballer who played in the 1960s and 1970s for Leigh; Les Chisnall, and the older brother of the rugby league footballer; David "Dave" Chisnall.
