= Ray Batten =

English rugby player and coach (1945–2020)

Personal information
- Full name: Raymond Batten
- Born: 23 September 1945 York, Yorkshire, England
- Died: 23 September 2020 (aged 75)

Playing information
- Position: Second-row, Loose forward
Club
Years	Team	Pld	T	G	FG	P
1963–76	Leeds	434	80	0	0	240
Representative
Years	Team	Pld	T	G	FG	P
1968–69	England	3	2	0	0	6
1969–73	Great Britain	3	0	0	0	0

Coaching information
Club
Years	Team	Gms	W	D	L	W%
1980–81	Wakefield Trinity
1982–83	Wakefield Trinity
	Total	0	0	0	0
- Relatives: Billy Batten (grandfather); Eric Batten (uncle)

Raymond Batten (23 September 1945 – 23 September 2020) was an English professional rugby league footballer who played in the 1960s and 1970s, and coached in the 1980s. He played at representative level for Great Britain and England, and at club level for Heworth ARLFC and Leeds as a second-row or loose forward, and coached at club level for Wakefield Trinity.

== Playing career ==
=== Challenge Cup Final appearances ===
Batten played loose forward in Leeds' 11-10 victory over Wakefield Trinity in the 1968 Challenge Cup "Watersplash" final during the 1967-68 season at Wembley Stadium, London on Saturday 11 May 1968, and played loose forward in the 13-16 defeat by St. Helens in the 1972 Challenge Cup Final during the 1971-72 season at Wembley Stadium, London on Saturday 13 May 1972.

=== County Cup Final appearances ===
Batten played loose forward in Leeds' 22-11 victory over Castleford in the 1968 Yorkshire Cup Final during the 1968–69 season at Belle Vue, Wakefield on Saturday 19 October 1968, played loose forward in the 23-7 victory over Featherstone Rovers in the 1970 Yorkshire Cup Final during the 1970–71 season at Odsal Stadium, Bradford on Saturday 21 November 1970, played loose forward in the 36-9 victory over Dewsbury in the 1972 Yorkshire Cup Final during the 1972–73 season at Odsal Stadium, Bradford on Saturday 7 October 1972, played loose forward in the 7-2 victory over Wakefield Trinity in the 1973 Yorkshire Cup Final during the 1973–74 season at Headingley, Leeds on Saturday 20 October 1973, and played right-second-row in the 15-11 victory over Hull Kingston Rovers in the 1975 Yorkshire Cup Final during the 1975–76 season at Headingley, Leeds on Saturday 15 November 1975.

=== BBC2 Floodlit Trophy Final appearances ===
Batten played loose forward in Leeds' 9-5 victory over St. Helens in the 1970 BBC2 Floodlit Trophy Final during the 1970–71 season at Headingley, Leeds on Tuesday 15 December 1970.

=== Testimonial match ===
Batten's Testimonial match at Leeds took place in 1974.

=== International honours ===
Batten won caps for England while at Leeds in 1968 against Wales, in 1969 against Wales, and France, and won caps for Great Britain while at Leeds in 1969 against France, and in 1973 against Australia (2 matches).

== Coaching career ==
Batten was the coach of Wakefield Trinity from April 1980 to May 1981 and again from May 1982 to July 1983.

== Death ==
Batten died on 23 September 2020, at the age of 75.

== Genealogical Information ==
Ray Batten was the son of the rugby league footballer; Billy Batten Jr., the grandson of the rugby league footballer; Billy Batten, and the nephew of the rugby league footballer; Eric Batten.
