= Jim Challinor =

Former GB RL coach & English dual-code rugby footballer

Personal information
- Full name: James Pevitt Challinor
- Born: 2 August 1934 Warrington, England
- Died: 18 December 1976 (aged 42) Warrington, England

Playing information
- Height: 6 ft 0 in (1.83 m)
- Weight: 13 st 5 lb (85 kg; 187 lb)
- Position: Wing, Centre
Club
Years	Team	Pld	T	G	FG	P
1952–63	Warrington	282	135	2	0	409
1963–67	Barrow	119+2	20	2	0	64
1967–68	Liverpool City	22	1	0	0	3
	Total	425	156	4	0	476
Representative
Years	Team	Pld	T	G	FG	P
1958–60	Great Britain	3	1	0	0	3
1956	England Services	1	1	0	0	3
1959–60	Lancashire	2	0	0	0	0

Coaching information
Club
Years	Team	Gms	W	D	L	W%
1963–67	Barrow
1967–68	Liverpool City
1970–74	St. Helens
1974–76	Oldham
	Total	0	0	0	0
Representative
Years	Team	Gms	W	D	L	W%
1958–59	Great Britain	8	5	0	3	63
1972–74	Great Britain	17	11	1	5	65

Rugby union career
International career
Years	Team	Apps	(Points)
1955	RAF Rugby Union		

James Pevitt Challinor (2 August 1934 – 18 December 1976) was an English rugby union and professional rugby league footballer who played in the 1950s and 1960s, and coached rugby league in the 1960s and 1970s. A Great Britain international representative three-quarter back, he played club level rugby league (RL) for Warrington (with whom he won the 1954 Challenge Cup), and Barrow (who he also captained). Challinor later coached Great Britain as well as Barrow, Liverpool City and St. Helens. Challinor is a Warrington Wolves Hall of Fame inductee, only two men have played in, and coached Rugby League World Cup winning Great Britain sides, they are; Eric Ashton, and Jim Challinor.

== Biography ==
Challinor was born in Warrington, Lancashire.

=== Playing career ===
Challinor had been offered a trial at Manchester United, but made his début aged-18 for Warrington against St. Helens in October 1952, he initially played on the wing, but later moved into the centres. Challinor played right-centre and scored the first try in Warrington's 8–4 victory over Halifax in the 1953–54 Challenge Cup Final replay during the 1953–54 season at Odsal Stadium, Bradford on Wednesday 5 May 1954, in front of a record crowd of 102,575 or more. Challinor played in Warrington's 8–7 victory over Halifax the Championship Final during the 1953–54 season at Maine Road, Manchester on Saturday 8 May 1954, in front of a crowd of 36,519, played in the 7–3 victory over Oldham the Championship Final during the 1954–55 season at Maine Road, Manchester on Saturday 14 May 1955.

Jim Challinor's marriage to Wendy (née Stringer) (birth registered during fourth ¼ 1935 in Warrington district) was registered during fourth ¼ 1956 in Newton district. They would go on to have children; Neil Challinor (birth registered during second ¼ 1957 (age 68–69) in Newton district), Yvonne Challinor (birth registered during second ¼ 1960 (age 65–66) in Runcorn district), and Nadine Challinor (birth registered during third ¼ 1964 (age 61–62) in Barrow-in-Furness district). During his period of national service he served with the Royal Air Force (RAF), and was based at RAF Padgate in Warrington. He also played representative level rugby union for the Royal Air Force.

Challinor won caps for Great Britain while at Warrington on the 1958 Great Britain Lions tour against Australia and New Zealand. He also played for the Lions in the 1960 Rugby League World Cup against France, helping Great Britain to victory. Challinor played in the 5–4 victory over St. Helens in the 1959–60 Lancashire Cup Final during the 1959–60 season at Central Park, Wigan on Saturday 31 October 1959, in front of a crowd of 39,237. Challinor played in the 10–25 defeat by victory over Leeds the Championship Final during the 1960–61 season at Odsal Stadium, Bradford on Saturday 20 May 1961. He made 282 appearances for Warrington, scoring 135 tries, kicking 2 goals for 409 points.

In 1963 Challinor moved to Barrow. He played right-centre and was captain-coach in Barrow's 12–17 defeat by Featherstone Rovers in the 1966–67 Challenge Cup Final during the 1966–67 season at Wembley Stadium, London on Saturday 13 May 1967.

Jim Challinor opened Challinor Sports at 146 Padgate Lane, Warrington in 1967.

=== Coaching career ===
After retiring from the playing field Challinor took up coaching. He joined St. Helens, and coached them in the 5–9 defeat by Leeds in the 1970 BBC2 Floodlit Trophy Final at Headingley, Leeds on Tuesday 15 December 1970, in front of a crowd of 7,612.

Challinor coached St Helens to the 16–12 victory over Wigan in the 1970–71 season's Championship Final at Station Road, Swinton on Saturday 22 May 1971. He also coached them to the 8–2 victory over Rochdale Hornets the 1971 BBC2 Floodlit Trophy Final during the 1971–72 season at Knowsley Road, St. Helens on Tuesday 14 December 1971, in front of a crowd of 9,255, the 16–13 victory over Leeds in the 1971–72 Challenge Cup Final during the 1971–72 season at Wembley Stadium, London on Saturday 13 May 1972, in front of a crowd of 89,495, the 5–9 defeat by Leeds the Championship Final during the 1971–72 season at Station Road, Swinton on Saturday 20 May 1972.

Challinor coached Great Britain to victory in the 1972 Rugby League World Cup in France. During the 1973 Kangaroo tour he coached Great Britain to an 11–7 victory over Australia at Knowsley Road, St. Helens on Tuesday 13 November 1973. Challinor was also coach on the 1974 Great Britain Lions tour, due to an injury crisis he came out of retirement on the New Zealand leg, he scored a try in the 33–2 victory over South Island rugby league team at Greymouth on Tuesday 6 August 1974, however he picked up an injury that resulted in him having a kidney removed.

=== Death ===
Challinor died from cancer in 1976, aged 42.
