= Mick Shoebottom =

GB & England international rugby league footballer (1944–2002)

Personal information
- Full name: Michael D. Shoebottom
- Born: 24 December 1944 Hunslet, Leeds, England
- Died: 12 October 2002 (aged 57) Leeds, England

Playing information
- Height: 5 ft 10 in (178 cm)
- Weight: 13 st 0 lb (83 kg)
- Position: Fullback, Centre, Stand-off, Scrum-half
Club
Years	Team	Pld	T	G	FG	P
1962–71	Leeds	288	117	52	0	355
Representative
Years	Team	Pld	T	G	FG	P
	Yorkshire	4
1968–70	England	4	1	0	0	3
1968–71	Great Britain	12	1	0	0	3

Michael "Mick" D. Shoebottom (24 December 1944 – 12 October 2002), also known by the nickname "Shoey", was an English professional rugby league footballer who played in the 1960s and 1970s. He played at representative level for Great Britain, England and Yorkshire, and at club level for Bison ARLFC (Bison in Stourton, Leeds) and Leeds, as a fullback, centre, stand-off or scrum-half.

== Playing career ==
=== Club career ===
Shoebottom played stand-off in Leeds' 2–18 defeat by Wakefield Trinity in the 1964 Yorkshire Cup Final during the 1964–65 season at Fartown Ground, Huddersfield on Saturday 31 October 1964, and played stand-off in the 22–11 victory over Castleford in the 1968 Yorkshire Cup Final during the 1968–69 season at Belle Vue, Wakefield on Saturday 19 October 1968, played scrum-half in the 23–7 victory over Featherstone Rovers in the 1970 Yorkshire Cup Final during the 1970–71 season at Odsal Stadium, Bradford on Saturday 21 November 1970.

Shoebottom played stand-off in Leeds' 11–10 victory over Wakefield Trinity in the 1968 Challenge Cup "Watersplash" final during the 1967-68 season at Wembley Stadium, London on Saturday 11 May 1968.

Shoebottom played scrum-half in Leeds' 9–5 victory over St. Helens in the 1970 BBC2 Floodlit Trophy Final during the 1970–71 season at Headingley, Leeds on Tuesday 15 December 1970.

While playing for Leeds during the 1970–71 Championship semi-final against Salford at Headingley, Shoebottom dived to score a try and was subsequently carried unconscious from the field, having been caught on the head by the boot of Colin Dixon. Although paralysed for a time, Shoebottom made an arduous recovery that enabled him to live a near normal life, but he would never play rugby league again.

=== International honours ===
Shoebottom won caps for England while at Leeds in 1968 against Wales, in 1969 against France (sub), in 1970 against Wales, and France, and won caps for Great Britain while at Leeds in the 1968 Rugby League World Cup against Australia, and New Zealand (sub) (1-try), in 1969 against France, in 1970 against Australia (2 matches), Australia (sub), and New Zealand, in the 1970 Rugby League World Cup against Australia, France, New Zealand, and Australia, and in 1971 against France.

== Testimonial match ==
Mick Shoebottom's Testimonial match at Leeds took place in 1972.
