= Kelvin Earl =

English rugby league footballer

Kel Earl
Personal information
- Full name: Kelvin Earl
- Born: 2 September 1951 (age 74) Littleborough, England

Playing information
- Position: Prop
Club
Years	Team	Pld	T	G	FG	P
1971	Rochdale Hornets
1971–72	St. Helens	10	2	0	0	6
1972–76	Bradford Northern	60	12	0	0	36
1976–81	Swinton	112	19	0	0	57
1981–82	Rochdale Hornets	28	3	0	0	9
	Total	210	36	0	0	108

Kelvin "Kel" Earl (born 2 September 1951) is an English former professional rugby league player. He played in the 1970s at club level for the Rochdale Hornets (two spells), St Helens, Bradford Northern and Swinton as a prop.

== Background ==
Kelvin Earl's birth was registered in Littleborough, Lancashire, England.

== Playing career ==
=== Challenge Cup Final appearances ===
Earl was an unused substitute in St. Helens' 16–13 victory over Leeds in the 1972 Challenge Cup Final during the 1971–72 season at Wembley Stadium, London on Saturday 13 May 1972, in front of a crowd of 89,495. He played at prop in Bradford Northern's 14–33 defeat by Featherstone Rovers in the 1973 Challenge Cup Final during the 1972–73 season at Wembley Stadium on Saturday 12 May 1973, in front of a crowd of 72,395.

=== Player's No.6 Trophy Final appearances ===
Earl played at prop in Bradford Northern's 3–2 victory over Widnes in the 1974–75 Player's No.6 Trophy Final during the 1974–75 season at Wilderspool Stadium, Warrington on Saturday 25 January 1975.
