= Robin Whitfield =

English rugby league referee (1943–2025)

Personal information
- Born: 26 November 1943 Widnes, England
- Died: 20 July 2025 (aged 81)

Playing information
Club
| Years | Team | Pld | T | G | FG | P |
|---|---|---|---|---|---|---|
| 1962–69 | Widnes | 116 | 20 | 209 | 0 | 478 |
| 1969–70 | Barrow | 45 | 5 | 29 | 0 | 73 |
| 1970–74 | Huyton |
| | Total | 161 | 25 | 238 | 0 | 551 |

Refereeing information
| Years | Competition | Apps |
| 1980–94 | Rugby Football League Championship |
| 1985–86 | New South Wales Rugby League |
| 1982–92 | Internationals |
- Relatives: Colin Whitfield (brother); Eric Prescott (cousin)

Robin Whitfield (26 November 1943 – 20 July 2025) was an English rugby league player and referee. As a player, he was a fullback for his hometown club Widnes, and later went on to play for Barrow and Huyton. After finishing his playing career, he became a referee, officiating his first professional game in 1980. He took charge of three Challenge Cup finals, and regularly refereed international matches throughout the 1980s.

== Biography ==
Whitfield was born in Widnes, Cheshire on 26 November 1943. He began playing rugby league as a fullback for his hometown club, Widnes. A prolific goal-kicker, he kicked 11 goals in a match in 1965, a club record which stood for over 30 years. He moved to Barrow in August 1969, where he made 45 appearances before transferring to Huyton a year later.

He eventually ended his playing career due to a poor disciplinary record and turned to refereeing. He was added to the Rugby Football League's Grade One referee's list during the 1980–81 season. He went on to officiate three Challenge Cup finals (in 1983, 1986 and 1992). He also took charge of the third game in the 1983 State of Origin series.

Throughout his career, he refereed over 400 games, both domestically and internationally, before retiring in 1994.

Whitfield died after suffering from Alzheimer's disease on 20 July 2025, at the age of 81.

== Personal life ==
Whitfield was the elder brother of Colin Whitfield, who played rugby league for Wigan and Salford.
