= John Walsh (rugby league) =

GB & England international rugby league footballer

Personal information
- Born: 13 June 1946 (age 80) St Helens, Lancashire, England

Playing information
- Position: Fullback, Wing, Centre, Stand-off
Club
Years	Team	Pld	T	G	FG	P
1968–75	St. Helens	185	48	156	0	456
Representative
Years	Team	Pld	T	G	FG	P
1970–75	Lancashire	5	1	10	0	23
1972	Great Britain	5	1	0	0	3
1975	England	3	0	0	0	0

John "Johnny" Walsh (born 13 June 1946), also known by the nickname of "Waller", is an English World Cup former winning professional rugby league footballer who played in the 1960s and 1970s. He played at representative level for Great Britain and England, and at club level for St Helens, as a fullback, wing, centre, or stand-off.

== Playing career ==
=== Club career ===
Walsh joined St Helens in 1968 from amateur club Moss Bank.

Walsh played at centre St Helens' 4–7 defeat by Leigh in the 1970–71 Lancashire Cup Final during the 1970–71 season at Station Road, Swinton on Saturday 28 November 1970.

Walsh played at centre in St Helens' 5–9 defeat by Leeds in the 1970 BBC2 Floodlit Trophy Final during the 1970-71 season at Headingley, Leeds on Tuesday 15 December 1970, and played at centre in the 8–2 victory over Rochdale Hornets in the 1971 BBC2 Floodlit Trophy Final during the 1971-72 season at Headingley, Leeds on Tuesday 14 December 1971.

Walsh played at centre in St Helens' 16–13 victory over Leeds in the 1971–72 Challenge Cup Final during the 1971-72 season at Wembley Stadium, London on Saturday 13 May 1972.

His final game for the club was the 1974–75 Premiership final defeat against Leeds, after which he retired to focus on his career outside of rugby league.

=== International honours ===
Walsh won caps for England while at St. Helens in 1975 against France, in the 1975 Rugby League World Cup against Australia, and New Zealand, in 1975 against Papua New Guinea (non-test), and won caps for Great Britain while at St. Helens in 1972 against France (sub), and in the 1972 Rugby League World Cup against Australia, France, New Zealand, and Australia.

== Outside rugby league ==
John Walsh now lives in Canada.
