= 1968–69 Lancashire Cup =

- Structure: Regional knockout championship
- Teams: 14
- Winners: St. Helens
- Runners-up: Oldham

The 1968–69 Rugby League Lancashire Cup competition was the fifty-sixth edition of the Lancashire Cup. St. Helens won the trophy by defeating Oldham by the score of 30-2. The match was played at Central Park, Wigan, (historically in the county of Lancashire). The attendance was 17,008, and receipts totalled £4644. This was the second of two consecutive Lancashire Cup final victories for St. Helens, and notably, the seventh time the club would win the trophy in nine successive seasons.

== Background ==
The total number of teams entering the competition remained unchanged at 14.
The same fixture format was retained. Due to the number of participating clubs, this resulted in no byes but one “blank” or “dummy” fixture in the first round, and one bye in the second round.

== Competition and results ==
=== Round 1 ===
Involved 7 matches (with no bye but one “blank” fixture) and 14 clubs

Game No	Fixture date	Home team	Score	Away team	Venue	Att	Rec	Notes	Ref
1	Fri 06 Sep 1968	Rochdale Hornets	5-17	Oldham	Athletic Grounds				
2	Fri 06 Sep 1968	Salford	14-3	Warrington	The Willows				
3	Fri 06 Sep 1968	Widnes	16-15	Huyton	Naughton Park			1	
4	Sat 07 Sep 1968	Leigh	15-15	Blackpool Borough	Hilton Park				
5	Sat 07 Sep 1968	St. Helens	19-16	Wigan	Knowsley Road	13500			
6	Sat 07 Sep 1968	Swinton	11-14	Workington Town	Station Road				
7	Sat 0704 Sep 1968	Whitehaven	19-9	Barrow	Recreation Ground				
8		blank		blank					

=== Round 1 - Replay ===
Involved 1 match

Game No	Fixture date	Home team	Score	Away team	Venue	Att	Rec	Notes	Ref
1	Wed 11 Sep 1968	Blackpool Borough	15-32	Leigh	Borough Park				

=== Round 2 - Quarter-finals ===
Involved 3 matches (with one bye) and 7 clubs

Game No	Fixture date	Home team	Score	Away team	Venue	Att	Rec	Notes	Ref
1	Mon 16 Sep 1968	Oldham	7-5	Workington Town	Watersheddings				
2	Tue 18 Sep 1968	Widnes	17-20	St. Helens	Naughton Park	10300			
3	Sat 22 Sep 1968	Whitehaven	4-17	Salford	Recreation Ground				
4		Leigh		bye					

=== Round 3 – Semi-finals ===
Involved 2 matches and 4 clubs

Game No	Fixture date	Home team	Score	Away team	Venue	Att	Rec	Notes	Ref
1	Mon 07 Oct 1968	Leigh	6-17	St. Helens	Hilton Park	12750			
2	Wed 09 Oct 1968	Salford	9-12	Oldham	The Willows				

=== Final ===
Game No	Fixture date	Home team	Score	Away team	Venue	Att	Rec	Notes	Ref
	Friday 25 October 1968	St. Helens	30-2	Oldham	Central Park	17,008	£4,644	2	

==== Teams and scorers ====
St. Helens	№	Oldham
	teams	
Austin Rhodes	1	Martin Murphy
Frank Wilson	2	Mike Elliott
Billy Benyon	3	Phil Larder
Frank Myler	4	Jim McCormack
Cennyd Williams	5	Derek Whitehead
Alan Whittle	6	Wilf Briggs
Tommy Bishop	7	Thomas "Tom" /"Tommy" Canning
John Warlow	8	Ken Wilson
Bill Sayer	9	Kevin Taylor
Cliff Watson	10	Geoff Fletcher
Graham Rees	11	Robert Irving
Eric Chisnall	12	Charlie McCourt
Kel Coslett	13	Arthur Hughes
John Houghton	14	Trevor Buckley
Brian Hogan	15	Dennis Maders (for Geoff Fletcher)
Cliff Evans	Coach	
30	score	2
0	HT	2
	Scorers	
	Tries	
Frank Wilson (2)	T	
Cen Williams (1)	T	
Tommy Bishop (1)	T	
Graham Rees (1)	T	
Eric Chisnall (1)	T	
	Goals	
Kel Coslett (6)	G	Wilf Briggs (1)
Referee		William "Billy" H. Thompson (Huddersfield)

Scoring - Try = three (3) points - Goal = two (2) points - Drop goal = two (2) points

=== The road to success ===
First round
Leigh	15-32
Blackpool Borough	15-15
blank
blank
Widnes	16
Huyton	15
St. Helens	19
Wigan	16
Whitehaven	19
Barrow	9
Salford	14
Warrington	3
Rochdale Hornets	5
Oldham	17
Swinton	11
Workington Town	14

Second round
Leigh
bye
Widnes	17
St. Helens	20
Whitehaven	4
Salford	17
Oldham	7
Workington Town	5

Semi-finals
Leigh	6
St. Helens	17
Salford	9
Oldham	12

Final
St. Helens	30
Oldham	2

== Notes and comments ==
1 * This was the first Lancashire Cup match played by new/newly renamed club Huyton (who were "homeless" for this their first season)
2 * Central Park was the home ground of Wigan with a final capacity of 18,000, although the record attendance was 47,747 for Wigan v St Helens 27 March 1959

== See also ==
- 1968–69 Northern Rugby Football League season
- Rugby league county cups
