= Graham Rees =

Wales international rugby league footballer

Personal information
- Full name: Graham Rees
- Born: 18 April 1936 Maesteg, Glamorgan, Wales
- Died: July 1987 (aged 51) Prestwich, England

Playing information

Rugby union
Club
Years	Team	Pld	T	G	FG	P
	Maesteg RFC

Rugby league
- Position: Prop, Second-row, Loose forward
Club
Years	Team	Pld	T	G	FG	P
≤1968–≤68	Salford
≤1968–68	Swinton
1968–73	St. Helens	181	33	0	0	99
1973–≥73	Salford
	Total	181	33	0	0	99
Representative
Years	Team	Pld	T	G	FG	P
1968–70	Wales	4

Graham Rees (18 April 1936 – July 1987) was a Welsh rugby union, and professional rugby league footballer who played in the 1960s and 1970s. He played club level rugby union (RU) for Maesteg RFC, and representative level rugby league (RL) for Wales, and at club level for Salford (two spells) Swinton and St. Helens as a prop, second-row, or loose forward.

== Background ==
Graham Rees was born in Maesteg, Wales, and he died aged 51 in Prestwich, Greater Manchester, England.

== Playing career ==
=== International honours ===
Graham Rees won caps for Wales (RL) while at St. Helens 1968-70 - 4-caps.

=== Challenge Cup Final appearances ===
Graham Rees played at prop in St Helens' 16–13 victory over Leeds in the 1972 Challenge Cup Final during the 1971-72 season at Wembley Stadium, London on Saturday 13 May 1972. He scored the first try of the game after just 35 seconds; the fastest try in Challenge Cup Final history.

=== County Cup Final appearances ===
Graham Rees played at second-row in Swinton's 4–12 defeat by St. Helens in the 1964 Lancashire Cup Final during the 1964–65 season at Central Park, Wigan on Saturday 24 October 1964, played at second-row, and scored a try in St. Helens' 30–2 victory over Oldham in the 1968 Lancashire Cup Final during the 1968–69 season at Central Park, Wigan on Friday 25 October 1968, and played at prop in the 4–7 defeat by Leigh in the 1970 Lancashire Cup Final during the 1970–71 season at Station Road, Swinton on Saturday 28 November 1970.

=== BBC2 Floodlit Trophy Final appearances ===
Graham Rees played at second-row in Swinton's 2–7 defeat by Castleford in the 1966 BBC2 Floodlit Trophy Final during the 1966–67 season at Wheldon Road, Castleford on Tuesday 20 December 1966, played at prop in St. Helens' 5–9 defeat by Leeds in the 1970 BBC2 Floodlit Trophy Final during the 1966–67 season at Headingley, Castleford on Tuesday 15 December 1970, and played at prop in the 8–2 victory over Rochdale Hornets in the 1971 BBC2 Floodlit Trophy Final during the 1971–72 season at Knowsley Road, St. Helens on Tuesday 14 December 1971.

== Death ==
On 1 August 1987, it was reported that Rees had died following a collapse shortly after playing squash at a club in Prestwich.
