= Les Jones (rugby league, born 1948) =

GB & England international rugby league footballer

Personal information
- Full name: Leslie Jones
- Born: 19 July 1948 (age 77); Blackbrook, St. Helens, England

Playing information
- Position: Wing, Centre
Club
| Years | Team | Pld | T | G | FG | P |
|---|---|---|---|---|---|---|
| 1967–81 | St. Helens | 477+8 | 282 | 0 | 0 | 846 |
Representative
| Years | Team | Pld | T | G | FG | P |
| 1968–78 | Lancashire | 9 | 1 | 0 | 0 | 3 |
| 1977 | England | 1 | 0 | 0 | 0 | 0 |
| 1971 | Great Britain | 1 | 0 | 0 | 0 | 0 |

Leslie "Les" Jones (born 19 July 1948) is an English former professional rugby league footballer who played in the 1960s, 1970s and 1980s. He played at representative level for Great Britain, England and Lancashire, and at club level for St. Helens, as a wing, or centre.

== Background ==
Jones was born in Blackbrook, St. Helens, Lancashire, England.

== Playing career ==
=== Club career ===
Jones made his debut for St Helens on Good Friday 1967, scoring a try in the 21–7 victory over local rivals Wigan.

Jones played on the wing (replacing Tony Barrow, who had played in the original final) and scored a try in the 13–10 victory over Warrington in the 1967 Lancashire Cup Final replay during the 1967–68 season at Station Road, Swinton on Saturday 2 December 1967, and played on the wing in the 4–7 defeat by Leigh in the 1970 Lancashire Cup Final during the 1970–71 season at Station Road, Swinton on Saturday 28 November 1970.

Jones played on the wing and scored a try in St Helens' 5–9 defeat by Leeds in the 1970 BBC2 Floodlit Trophy Final during the 1970–71 season at Headingley, Leeds on Tuesday 15 December 1970, played on the wing in the 8–2 victory over Rochdale Hornets in the 1971 BBC2 Floodlit Trophy Final during the 1971–72 season at Headingley, Leeds on Tuesday 14 December 1971, played on the wing in the 22–2 victory over Dewsbury in the 1975 BBC2 Floodlit Trophy Final during the 1975–76 season at Knowsley Road, St Helens on Tuesday 16 December 1975, played on the wing in the 11–26 defeat by Hull Kingston Rovers in the 1977 BBC2 Floodlit Trophy Final during the 1977–78 season at Craven Park, Kingston upon Hull on Tuesday 13 December 1977, and played on the wing in the 7–13 defeat by Widnes in the 1978 BBC2 Floodlit Trophy Final during the 1978–79 season at Knowsley Road, St Helens on Tuesday 12 December 1978.

Jones played on the wing in St Helens' 16–13 victory over Leeds in the 1972 Challenge Cup Final during the 1971–72 season at Wembley Stadium, London on Saturday 13 May 1972, and in the 20–5 victory over Widnes in the 1976 Challenge Cup Final during the 1975–76 season at Wembley Stadium, London on Saturday 8 May 1976.

Jones played on the wing in St Helens' 2–25 defeat by the 1975 NSWRFL season premiers, Eastern Suburbs Roosters in the unofficial 1976 World Club Challenge at Sydney Cricket Ground on Tuesday 29 June 1976.

With 282 tries, Jones is the second highest all-time try-scorer for St Helens behind Tom van Vollenhoven, who scored 392.

=== International honours ===
Jones won a cap for England while at St. Helens in 1977 against Wales, and won a cap for Great Britain while at St. Helens in 1971 against New Zealand.
