= Jeff Heaton =

English rugby league footballer

Personal information
- Full name: Jeffrey Heaton
- Born: 13 October 1943 (age 81); St. Helens, England

Playing information
- Position: Scrum-half
Club
Years	Team	Pld	T	G	FG	P
1962–63	St. Helens	28	6	0	0	18
1963–69	Liverpool City/Huyton
1969–76	St. Helens	291	68	6	1	217
1976–??	Rochdale Hornets
	Total	319	74	6	1	235

Jeffrey Heaton (born 13 October 1943) is an English former professional rugby league footballer who played in the 1960s and 1970s who became a St Helens R.F.C. Hall of Fame inductee. He played at club level for St Helens (two spells), Liverpool City/Huyton and Rochdale Hornets, as a scrum-half.

== Background ==
Jeff Heaton was born in St. Helens, Lancashire, England.

== Playing career ==
=== World Club Challenge Final appearances ===
Jeff Heaton was a substitute in St Helens 2-25 defeat by the 1975 NSWRFL season premiers, Eastern Suburbs Roosters in the unofficial 1976 World Club Challenge at Sydney Cricket Ground on Tuesday 29 June 1976.

=== Challenge Cup Final appearances ===
Jeff Heaton played scrum-half in St Helens' 16-13 victory over Leeds in the 1972 Challenge Cup Final during the 1971-72 season at Wembley Stadium, London on Saturday 13 May 1972, and played stand-off, and scored a try in the 20-5 victory over Widnes in the 1976 Challenge Cup Final during the 1975–76 season at Wembley Stadium, London on Saturday 8 May 1976.

=== County Cup Final appearances ===
Jeff Heaton played scrum-half in St. Helens' 7-4 victory over Swinton in the 1962 Lancashire Cup Final during the 1962–63 season at Central Park, Wigan on Saturday 27 October 1962, and was an unused substitute in the 4-7 defeat by Leigh in the 1970 Lancashire Cup Final during the 1970–71 season at Station Road, Swinton on Saturday 28 November 1970.

=== BBC2 Floodlit Trophy Final appearances ===
Jeff Heaton played scrum-half in St. Helens' 5-9 defeat by Leeds in the 1970 BBC2 Floodlit Trophy Final during the 1970-71 season at Headingley, Leeds on Tuesday 15 December 1970, played scrum-half in the 8-2 victory over Rochdale Hornets in the 1971 BBC2 Floodlit Trophy Final during the 1971-72 season at Headingley, Leeds on Tuesday 14 December 1971, and played scrum-half, and scored a drop goal in the 22-2 victory over Dewsbury in the 1975 BBC2 Floodlit Trophy Final during the 1975-76 season at Knowsley Road, St. Helens on Tuesday 16 December 1975.
