= Louis Neumann =

South African rugby league player and coach

Personal information
- Born: 1941
- Died: 2003 (aged 61–62)

Playing information
- Position: Prop, second-row
Club
Years	Team	Pld	T	G	FG	P
1961–66	Leeds	159	16	0	1	50
1967–71	Eastern Suburbs	81	3	0	0	9
	Total	240	19	0	1	59

Coaching information
Club
Years	Team	Gms	W	D	L	W%
1969	Eastern Suburbs	22	8	1	13	36

Louis Neumann (1941 – 2003) was a South African-born professional rugby league player and coach. Originally a rugby union player, he was signed by Leeds in 1960–61. Having made 123 appearances for the English side, he moved to Australia to play for the Eastern Suburbs ahead of the 1967 NSWRFL season. He played in 81 matches for the club, including 22 as player-coach in 1969, following the departure of Jack Gibson.

After leaving the Eastern Suburbs in 1971, Neumann moved to Orange, New South Wales, and became the player-coach of Orange Ex-Services. He died in 2003.
