= New Broughton Rangers =

Defunct English amateur rugby league club

Club information
- Full name: New Broughton Rangers ARLFC
- Colours: Dark blue, sky blue and white
- Founded: circa 2007; 19 years ago
- Exited: 2010; 16 years ago
- Website: New Broughton Rangers Facebook

Former details
- Competition: None

New Broughton Rangers were a rugby league team based in Broughton, Salford. They played in the North West Premier division of the Rugby League Conference, but have since withdrawn from the league and are no longer active. New Broughton Rangers are not connected to the historic rugby league club Broughton Rangers. The rights to the intellectual property of Broughton Rangers and Belle Vue Rangers are owned by entrepreneur Stefan Hopewell, who is also currently chairman of Mancunians RL, based in the south of the city.

== History ==
=== History of rugby league in Broughton ===
Broughton Rangers were founded in 1877. They were one of the twenty-one clubs to meet at the George Hotel, Huddersfield on 29 August 1895 to form the Northern Rugby Football Union.

The club went on to win the Championship once; the Challenge Cup twice; the Lancashire County Cup twice and the Lancashire League twice. They were also runners-up in the Challenge Cup on two occasions and the Lancashire Cup once.

In 1933, Broughton Rangers moved out of Broughton to the Belle Vue Stadium. In 1945/46, Broughton rebranded themselves as Belle Vue Rangers. The team folded after the 1954/55 season.

=== New Broughton Rangers ===
New Broughton Rangers were formed with the assistance of Salford City Reds and competed in the Dolben Cup at the 2007 York International 9s. They won one game out of three and failed to make it out of their pool. Rangers joined the Rugby League Conference in 2008, finishing second in the North West division.

The club played their home games at Peel Park, Salford located next to the Salford University Leisure Centre.

They stepped up to the RLC North West Premier for the 2009 & 2010 seasons, but dropped out of the league part way through the 2010 season and their results were deleted from the records.
