= Tony Karalius =

GB international rugby league footballer (1943–2019)

Personal information
- Full name: Anthony Karalius
- Born: 19 September 1943 Widnes, England
- Died: 29 November 2019 (aged 76)

Playing information
- Position: Hooker
Club
Years	Team	Pld	T	G	FG	P
1963–66	Widnes	38	4	0	0	12
1967–78	St. Helens	355	26	0	0	78
1978–80	Wigan	39	1	0	0	3
1980–81	Fulham RLFC	22	2	0	0	6
1981–82	Cardiff City Blue Dragons	25	1	0	0	3
	Total	479	34	0	0	102
Representative
Years	Team	Pld	T	G	FG	P
1971–72	Great Britain	5	0	0	0	0
1971–72	Lancashire	4	2	0	0	6
- Relatives: Vince Karalius (brother)

Anthony Karalius (19 September 1943 – 29 November 2019) was an English professional rugby league footballer who played in the 1960s, 1970s and 1980s. He played at representative level for Great Britain, and at club level for Widnes, St Helens, Wigan, Fulham RLFC and the Cardiff City Blue Dragons, as a hooker.

== Background ==
Tony Karalius was born in Widnes, Lancashire, England. He was of Lithuanian background. His surname means King in Lithuanian.

== Playing career ==
=== St Helens ===
Karalius joined St Helens from Widnes in January 1967 for a fee of £1,500. He replaced Bill Sayer as the club's first-choice hooker during the 1969–70 season.

Karalius was a substitute in St. Helens' 2–2 draw with Warrington in the 1967 Lancashire Cup Final during the 1967–68 season at Station Road, Swinton on Saturday 7 October 1967, but he did not play in the replay at Station Road, Swinton on Saturday 2 December 1967. He played hooker in the 4–7 defeat by Leigh in the 1970 Lancashire Cup Final during the 1970–71 season at Station Road, Swinton on Saturday 28 November 1970.

Karalius played hooker in St. Helens' 5–9 defeat by Leeds in the 1970 BBC2 Floodlit Trophy Final during the 1970-71 season at Headingley, Leeds on Tuesday 15 December 1970, played hooker in the 8–2 victory over Rochdale Hornets in the 1971 BBC2 Floodlit Trophy Final during the 1971-72 season at Headingley, Leeds on Tuesday 14 December 1971, played hooker in the 22–2 victory over Dewsbury in the 1975 BBC2 Floodlit Trophy Final during the 1975-76 season at Knowsley Road, St. Helens on Tuesday 16 December 1975, and played right-second-row in the 11–26 defeat by Hull Kingston Rovers in the 1977 BBC2 Floodlit Trophy Final during the 1977–78 season at Hilton Park, Leigh on Tuesday 13 December 1977.

Karalius played hooker in St. Helens' 20-5 victory over Widnes in the 1976 Challenge Cup Final during the 1975–76 season at Wembley Stadium, London on Saturday 8 May 1976.

Karalius played hooker in St. Helens 2–25 defeat by the 1975 NSWRFL season premiers, Eastern Suburbs Roosters in the unofficial 1976 World Club Challenge at Sydney Cricket Ground on Tuesday 29 June 1976.

He was an unused substitute in the 12-14 defeat by Leeds in the 1978 Challenge Cup Final during the 1977–78 season at Wembley Stadium, London on Saturday 13 May 1978, in front of a crowd of a crowd of 96,000.

=== Later career ===
In October 1978, Karalius was signed by Wigan for a fee of £2,500. He announced his retirement from rugby league in February 1980, but was persuaded to come out of retirement the following season to join newly formed club Fulham.

=== International honours ===
Karalius won caps for Great Britain while at St. Helens in 1971 against New Zealand (3 matches), in 1972 against France, and in the 1972 Rugby League World Cup against New Zealand.

== Personal life ==
Tony Karalius was the younger brother of the rugby league footballer who played in the 1950s and 1960s for St. Helens, and Warrington; Denis/Dennis Karalius, and the St. Helens, and Widnes rugby league legend; Vince Karalius.
