= John Mantle (rugby) =

Welsh dual-code rugby footballer and coach (1942–2018)

Personal information
- Full name: John Thomas Mantle
- Born: 13 March 1942 Cardiff, Glamorgan, Wales
- Died: 18 November 2018 (aged 76)

Playing information

Rugby union
- Position: Number 8
Club
Years	Team	Pld	T	G	FG	P
	Bargoed RFC
	Loughborough Colleges
1962–65	Newport RFC
	Total	0	0	0	0	0
Representative
Years	Team	Pld	T	G	FG	P
1964	Wales	2				0

Rugby league
- Position: Wing, Centre, Prop, Second-row, Loose forward
Club
Years	Team	Pld	T	G	FG	P
1965–76	St. Helens	435	69	2	0	211
1976–77	Salford	37				18
1977–78	Leigh	39	4	0	0	12
1978–79	Barrow	28	1			3
1979–80	Keighley	13				0
1981	Oldham RLFC	1				0
1982	Blackpool Borough	1	1			3
	Total	554	75	2	0	247
Representative
Years	Team	Pld	T	G	FG	P
1966–73	Great Britain	13	0	0	0	0
1975	Wales	8	1	0	0	3
1975	Wales tour games	3+2	1	0	0	3
1966	GB tour games	6+1				9

Coaching information
Club
Years	Team	Gms	W	D	L	W%
1977–78	Leigh	0	0	0	0
1981	Cardiff Blue Dragons	0	0	0	0
	Total	0	0	0	0
Representative
Years	Team	Gms	W	D	L	W%
1978	Wales	1	0	0	1	0

John Mantle (13 March 1942 – 18 November 2018) was a Welsh dual-code international rugby player. He was capped for Wales at rugby union, and Great Britain and Wales in rugby league.

== Personal ==
=== Education ===
He attended Bedwellty Grammar School, and later Loughborough College.

== Rugby Union career ==
Mantle began his rugby career at a young age, playing for the Wales School team. As an adult he played with Bargoed before switching to first class team Newport.

=== International ===
While representing Newport, Mantle was selected for his two Welsh rugby union caps. His first was when he was selected as part of the touring Wales team to Africa. Mantle played in the early games of the tour, including wins over East Africa in Nairobi, and Boland at Wellington. His first international was against South Africa in Durban in 1964, but Wales were outclassed and lost 24–3 in a one-sided match. Mantle played in the later games on the tour, including matches against Northern Transvaal and Orange Free State. On his return he played one final game in a draw with England, at the Twickenham as part of the 1964 Five Nations Championship.

Wales rugby union

- England 1964
- South Africa 1964

== Rugby League career ==
Mantle may have won more caps for Wales, but 'Went North', switching to the professional rugby league code when he joined St. Helens in 1964. He would later play for the Great Britain rugby league team. John Mantle played at prop in St. Helens' 2–25 defeat by the 1975 NSWRFL season premiers, Eastern Suburbs Roosters in the unofficial 1976 World Club Challenge at Sydney Cricket Ground on Tuesday 29 June 1976. After leaving St Helens, he went on to play for Salford, Leigh, Barrow, Keighley, Oldham RLFC and finished his playing career at Blackpool Borough.

=== International games played ===
In rugby league Mantle was capped 13 times by Great Britain between 1966 and 1973, and won eight caps for Wales in 1975. He scored one try for Wales, giving him an overall total of 21 international rugby league appearances and three points.

=== Championship final appearances ===
John Mantle played loose forward in St. Helens' 35–12 victory over Halifax in the Championship Final during the 1965–66 season at Station Road, Swinton on Saturday 28 May 1966, in front of a crowd of 30,165.

=== Challenge Cup Final appearances ===
John Mantle played loose forward and scored a try in St. Helens' 21–2 victory over Wigan in the 1966 Challenge Cup Final during the 1965–66 season at Wembley Stadium, London on Saturday 21 May 1966, in front of a crowd of 98,536, and played at second-row in the 16–13 victory over Leeds in the 1972 Challenge Cup Final during the 1971–72 season at Wembley Stadium, London on Saturday 13 May 1972, in front of a crowd of 89,495.

=== County Cup Final appearances ===
John Mantle played at second-row in St. Helens' 2–2 draw with Warrington in the 1967 Lancashire Cup Final during the 1967–68 season at Station Road, Swinton on Saturday 7 October 1967 (replaced by Kel Coslett in the replay), and played at second-row in the 4–7 defeat by Leigh in the 1970 Lancashire Cup Final during the 1970–71 season at Station Road, Swinton on Saturday 28 November 1970.

=== BBC2 Floodlit Trophy Final appearances ===
John Mantle played at second-row in St. Helens' 0–4 defeat by Castleford in the 1965 BBC2 Floodlit Trophy Final during the 1965–66 season at Knowsley Road, St. Helens on Tuesday 14 December 1965, played at second-row in St. Helens' 4–7 defeat by Wigan in the 1968 BBC2 Floodlit Trophy Final during the 1968-69 season at Central Park, Wigan on Tuesday 17 December 1968. played at second-row in the 5–9 defeat by Leeds in the 1970 BBC2 Floodlit Trophy Final during the 1970-71 season at Headingley, Leeds on Tuesday 15 December 1970, played at second-row in the 8–2 victory over Rochdale Hornets in the 1971 BBC2 Floodlit Trophy Final during the 1971-72 season at Headingley, Leeds on Tuesday 14 December 1971, and played at prop in the 22–2 victory over Dewsbury in the 1975 BBC2 Floodlit Trophy Final during the 1975-76 season at Knowsley Road, St. Helens on Tuesday 16 December 1975.

=== Coaching ===
He was head coach of Leigh and later the Cardiff City Blue Dragons. He also had a brief spell as coach at Blackpool Borough.

He coached Wales for one fixture, along with Bill Francis, v England on 28 May 1978; England won 60–13.

== Bibliography ==
- Thomas, Wayne (1979). A Century of Welsh Rugby Players. Ansells Ltd.
- Smith, David; Williams, Gareth (1980). Fields of Praise: The Official History of The Welsh Rugby Union. Cardiff: University of Wales Press. ISBN 0-7083-0766-3.

Sporting positions
Preceded by Club formed	Coach Cardiff Blue Dragons; 1981	Succeeded by David Watkins; 1981-1984
