= John Stephens (rugby league) =

English rugby league footballer

Personal information
- Full name: John Roland Stephens
- Born: 2 September 1945 (age 80); Widnes, Cheshire, England

Playing information
- Position: Prop
Club
Years	Team	Pld	T	G	FG	P
1963–70	Wigan	234	22	0	0	66
1970–74	St. Helens	128	16	0	0	48
1974–76	Widnes	27	2	1	0	8
1979	Wigan	4	1	0	0	3
	Total	393	41	1	0	125
Representative
Years	Team	Pld	T	G	FG	P
1968–72	Lancashire	7
1969–70	England	3	0	0	0	0

John Roland Stephens (born 2 September 1945) is an English former professional rugby league footballer who played in the 1960s and 1970s. He played at representative level for England and Lancashire, and at club level for Wigan (two spells), St Helens and Widnes as a prop.

== Background ==
Stephens was born in Widnes, Lancashire. His birth was registered in Prescot, Lancashire, England. He was a restaurateur in Liverpool. As of 2008, he lives in Newcastle upon Tyne with his second wife Judith, who he married after his first wife of over 40 years, Sue, died in tragic circumstances at the age of 59. John and Sue had 2 children together (Mark and Sarah) and 4 grand children (Lewis, James, Lydia and Sophie)

== Playing career ==
=== Wigan ===
Stephens played right-prop in Wigan's 16–13 victory over Oldham in the 1966 Lancashire Cup Final during the 1966–67 season at Station Road, Swinton on Saturday 29 October 1966,

He played left-prop in Wigan's 7–4 victory over St. Helens in the 1968 BBC2 Floodlit Trophy Final during the 1968–69 season at Central Park, Wigan on Tuesday 17 December 1968, and played left-prop in the 6–11 defeat by Leigh in the 1969 BBC2 Floodlit Trophy Final during the 1969–70 season at Central Park, Wigan on Tuesday 16 December 1969.

=== St Helens ===
After being transfer listed at his own request, Stephens was signed by St Helens in December 1970.

Stephens played right-prop in St Helens' 16–13 victory over Leeds in the 1972 Challenge Cup Final during the 1971-72 season at Wembley Stadium, London on Saturday 13 May 1972.

=== Widnes ===
In September 1974, Stephens was signed by Widnes for a fee of £2,000, and scored a try on his debut against Bradford Northern.

He played right-prop in Widnes' 6–2 victory over Salford in the 1974 Lancashire Cup Final during the 1974–75 season at Central Park, Wigan on Saturday 2 November 1974.

=== Representative honours ===
Stephens won caps for England while at Wigan in 1969 against Wales, and France, and in 1970 against France.

He was also selected for the 1970 Great Britain Lions tour, but was forced to withdraw due to injury.
