= Kel Coslett =

Former Wales rugby league coach and Wales dual-code international rugby footballer

Kel Coslett junior
Personal information
- Full name: Thomas Kelvin Coslett
- Born: 14 January 1942 (age 84) Bynea, Carmarthenshire, Wales

Playing information
- Height: 6 ft 0 in (183 cm)
- Weight: 14 st 11 lb (94 kg)

Rugby union
- Position: Full-back
Club
Years	Team	Pld	T	G	FG	P
1961–62	Aberavon
19??–??	Llanelli
	Total	0	0	0	0	0
Representative
Years	Team	Pld	T	G	FG	P
1962	Wales	3				3

Rugby league
- Position: Fullback, Prop, Second-row, Loose forward
Club
Years	Team	Pld	T	G	FG	P
1962–76	St. Helens	519+12	45	1639	0	3413
1976–79	Rochdale Hornets	47+2	3	38	1	86
	Total	580	48	1677	1	3499
Representative
Years	Team	Pld	T	G	FG	P
1963–75	Wales	12	1	8	0	19
1974	Other Nationalities	1	0	2	0	4
1975	Wales tour games	4	1	10	0	23

Coaching information
Club
Years	Team	Gms	W	D	L	W%
1976–79	Rochdale Hornets
1979–80	Wigan
1980–82	St. Helens
	Total	0	0	0	0
Representative
Years	Team	Gms	W	D	L	W%
1978–81	Wales	5	0	0	5	0

Thomas Kelvin Coslett (born 14 January 1942) is a Welsh former dual-code international rugby union and professional rugby league footballer who played in the 1960s and 1970s, and coached rugby league in the 1970s and 1980s. He played representative level rugby union (RU) for Wales, and at club level for Aberavon RFC and Llanelli RFC, as a goal-kicking full-back, and representative level rugby league (RL) for Wales and Other Nationalities, and at club level for St. Helens (captain), and Rochdale Hornets, as a toe-end kicking style (rather than round the corner kicking style) goal-kicking fullback, prop, second-row, or loose forward, and coached at club level for Rochdale Hornets, Wigan and St. Helens.

== Background ==
Coslett was born in Bynea, Carmarthenshire, Wales.

== Rugby union ==
Coslett made his international rugby union début for Wales as a full-back in the 1962 Five Nations Championship match against England. He also appeared that year in the Test matches against Scotland and France, before shifting to the professional rugby league code in July 1962 with St Helens.

== Rugby league ==
Coslett played fullback, and scored two goals in St. Helens' 7–4 victory over Swinton in the 1962 Lancashire Cup Final at Central Park, Wigan on Saturday 27 October 1962, he played fullback in the 15–4 victory over Swinton in the 1963 Lancashire Cup Final at Central Park, Wigan on Saturday 26 October 1963, he played loose forward, and scored a goal in the 2–2 draw Warrington in the 1967 Lancashire Cup Final at Central Park, Wigan on Saturday 7 October 1967, he played second-row in the 13–10 victory over Warrington in the 1967 Lancashire Cup Final replay at Station Road, Swinton on Saturday 2 December 1967, he played loose forward and scored 6-goals in the 30–2 victory over Oldham in the 1968 Lancashire Cup Final at Central Park, Wigan on Friday 25 October 1968, he played loose forward, and scored 2-goals in the 4–7 defeat by Wigan in the 1968 BBC2 Floodlit Trophy Final at Central Park, Wigan on Tuesday 17 December 1968, he played loose forward, and scored 2-goal in the 4–7 defeat by Leigh in the 1970 Lancashire Cup Final at Station Road, Swinton on Saturday 28 November 1970, he played loose forward, and scored a goal in the 5–9 defeat by Leeds in the 1970 BBC2 Floodlit Trophy Final at Headingley, Leeds on Tuesday 15 December 1970, he played loose forward, and scored 4-goals in the 8–2 victory over Rochdale Hornets in the 1971 BBC2 Floodlit Trophy Final at Headingley, Leeds on Tuesday 14 December 1971, played loose forward, was captain, scored four goals, and a drop goal, and was man of the match winning the Lance Todd Trophy in the 16–13 victory over Leeds in the 1972 Challenge Cup Final during the 1971–72 season at Wembley Stadium, London on Saturday 13 May 1972, he played loose forward, and scored a goal in the 22–2 victory over Dewsbury in the 1975 BBC2 Floodlit Trophy Final at Knowsley Road, St. Helens on Tuesday 16 December 1975, he played at prop, and was captain, in the 20–5 victory over Widnes in the 1976 Challenge Cup Final at Wembley Stadium, London on Saturday 8 May 1976, he played right-prop, and was captain in the 2–25 defeat by the 1975 NSWRFL season premiers, Eastern Suburbs Roosters in the unofficial 1976 World Club Challenge at Sydney Cricket Ground on Tuesday 29 June 1976.

Coslett had 15 seasons at St. Helens from 1962 to 1976, making a total of 531 appearances – a club record until this total was surpassed by James Roby in 2023. He was a prolific goal-kicker landing 1,639 career goals and scoring 45 tries for the club. He started as a tough-tackling, raw-boned youngster. A broken ankle later in his career cost his blistering pace, but he remained ever a dangerous player with the ball in hand.

=== Records ===
Kel Coslett is one of less than ten Welshmen to have scored more than 2,000-points in their rugby league career and as of 2015, with 3,545-points is eighth on British rugby league's "most points in a career" record list behind Neil Fox, Jim Sullivan, Kevin Sinfield, Gus Risman, John Woods, Mick Nanyn and Cyril Kellett. The record for the most goals in a BBC2 Floodlit Trophy Final is 4-goals, and is jointly held by; Ron Willett, Kel Coslett and Dave Hall.

== Coaching career ==
Coslett went on to coach Wigan, Rochdale Hornets and St. Helens, and remains involved at St Helens more than 50-years after first signing.
