= 1971–72 Northern Rugby Football League season =

- League: Northern Rugby Football League
- Champions: Leeds
- League Leaders: Leeds
- Top point-scorer(s): David Watkins 473
- Top try-scorer(s): John Atkinson 38; Mike Lamb 38

The 1971–72 Northern Rugby Football League season was the 77th season of rugby league football. This season saw the entry of rugby league's first sponsors: Joshua Tetley and John Player.

== Season summary ==
This season saw the introduction of a new knock-out competition, the Player's No.6 Trophy, as a major secondary competition to the Challenge Cup. It began in this year as the Player's No.6 Trophy and finished up as the Regal Trophy before being abandoned after 1995-96 when the sport switched to summer.

Leeds won their third Championship when they beat St. Helens 9–5 in the Championship Final. Leeds also finished the regular season as league leaders.

The Challenge Cup winners were St. Helens who beat Leeds 16–13 in the final.

== Championship ==
Pos	Team	Pld	W	D	L	PF	PA	PAv	Pts	Qualification
1	Leeds (L)	34	28	2	4	750	325	2.308	58	Qualification for the Championship play-offs
2	Bradford Northern	34	26	2	6	724	357	2.028	54	Qualification for the Championship play-offs
3	St Helens	34	26	1	7	661	297	2.226	53	Qualification for the Championship play-offs
4	Wigan	34	25	0	9	702	314	2.236	50	Qualification for the Championship play-offs
5	Salford	34	25	0	9	720	338	2.130	50	Qualification for the Championship play-offs
6	Swinton	34	23	2	9	554	368	1.505	48	Qualification for the Championship play-offs
7	Featherstone Rovers	34	23	1	10	632	372	1.699	47	Qualification for the Championship play-offs
8	Rochdale Hornets	34	21	1	12	429	306	1.402	43	Qualification for the Championship play-offs
9	Wakefield Trinity	34	21	0	13	587	414	1.418	42	Qualification for the Championship play-offs
10	Castleford	34	20	1	13	488	368	1.326	41	Qualification for the Championship play-offs
11	Widnes	34	19	3	12	476	388	1.227	41	Qualification for the Championship play-offs
12	Dewsbury	34	18	2	14	431	352	1.224	38	Qualification for the Championship play-offs
13	Oldham	34	18	1	15	573	480	1.194	37	Qualification for the Championship play-offs
14	Hull Kingston Rovers	34	18	0	16	432	498	0.867	36	Qualification for the Championship play-offs
15	Warrington	34	16	3	15	537	397	1.353	35	Qualification for the Championship play-offs
16	Leigh	34	17	0	17	421	407	1.034	34	Qualification for the Championship play-offs
17	Huddersfield	34	17	0	17	394	435	0.906	34	
18	Barrow	34	16	2	16	375	508	0.738	34	
19	Hull	34	16	0	18	488	495	0.986	32	
20	York	34	15	2	17	465	498	0.934	32	
21	Halifax	34	14	0	20	398	564	0.706	28	
22	Bramley	34	13	0	21	333	542	0.614	26	
23	Whitehaven	34	12	0	22	394	523	0.753	24	
24	Workington Town	34	11	2	21	303	533	0.568	24	
25	Blackpool Borough	34	11	0	23	351	560	0.627	22	
26	Keighley	34	8	0	26	330	740	0.446	16	
27	Huyton	34	7	1	26	277	610	0.454	15	
28	Batley	34	5	2	27	249	628	0.396	12	
29	Doncaster	34	5	0	29	234	729	0.321	10	
30	Hunslet	34	2	0	32	300	662	0.453	4	

Rules for classification: 1) Points; 2) Points average; 3) Number of points scored;
(L) Won League Leader's Trophy

=== Play-offs ===
Round of 16
Leeds	40
Leigh	2
Swinton	11
Widnes	15
Salford	23
Dewsbury	7
Wigan	18
Oldham	8
St Helens	25
Hull KR	5
Rochdale Hornets	18
Wakefield Trinity	13
Featherstone Rovers	14
Castleford	18
Bradford Northern	37
Warrington	0

Quarter-finals
Leeds	20
Widnes	9
Salford	21
Wigan	9
St Helens	17
Rochdale Hornets	5
Castleford	12
Bradford Northern	22

Semi-finals
Leeds	10
Salford	0
St Helens	14
Bradford Northern	10

Final
Leeds	9
St Helens	5

=== Final ===
The Championship final was played at Swinton.

20 May 1972

Leeds	9 – 5	St Helens
Tries: Atkinson; Goals: Clawson (3)		Tries: Greenall; Goals: Walsh

Station Road, Swinton
Attendance: 24,055
Referee: S. Shepherd (Oldham)
Player of the Match: Terry Clawson

Leeds	Number	St Helens
	Teams	
John Holmes	1	Geoff Pimblett
Alan Smith	2	Les Jones
John Langley	3	Billy Benyon
Les Dyl	4	John Walsh
John Atkinson	5	Frank Wilson
Alan Hardisty	6	Ken Kelly
David Barham	7	Jeff Heaton
Terry Clawson	8	Graham Rees
David Ward	9	Les Greenall
Tony Fisher	10	John Stephens
Phil Cookson	11	John Mantle
Graham Eccles	12	Eric Chisnall
Ray Batten	13	Kel Coslett
	Subs	
David Hick (for Holmes)	14	Alan Whittle (for Jones)
Fred Pickup (for Fisher)	15	Kelvin Earl
Derek Turner	Coach	Jim Challinor

== Challenge Cup ==
The final was played between St. Helens and Leeds at Wembley Stadium, London on Saturday 13 May 1972, in front of a crowd of 89,495. After leading 12-6 at half time, St Helens beat Leeds 16-13. St Helens scorers were Les Jones (1 try), Graham Rees (1 try), and Kel Coslett (5 goals). St Helens forward Kel Coslett was the man of the match winning the Lance Todd Trophy. This was St Helens’ fourth Cup Final win in eight Final appearances.

== Player's No.6 Trophy ==
Player's No.6 Trophy winners were Halifax who beat Wakefield Trinity 22-11 in the final.

== County cups ==
Wigan beat Widnes 15–8 to win the Lancashire County Cup, and Hull Kingston Rovers beat Castleford 11–7 to win the Yorkshire County Cup.

== Sources ==
- Saxton, Irvin (ed.). History of Rugby League: No.77 1971–1972. League Publications.
- 1971-72 Rugby Football League season at wigan.rlfans.com
- The Challenge Cup at The Rugby Football League website
