= 1970–71 Northern Rugby Football League season =

1970–71 Rugby Football League season
- League: Northern Rugby Football League
- Champions: St. Helens
- League Leaders: Wigan
- Top point-scorer: Kel Coslett 395
- Top try-scorer(s): Bob Haigh 40; Les Jones 40

The 1970–71 Rugby Football League season was the 76th season of rugby league football.

== Season summary ==
Sunday afternoon rugby was allowed for the first time by the RFL on 17 December 1967. Initially most clubs chose not to switch away from Saturdays despite competition from association football. The first ever Sunday fixtures were Bradford Northern v York, and Leigh v Dewsbury.

St. Helens won their sixth Championship when they beat Wigan 16–12 in the Championship Final. Wigan had ended the regular season as the league leaders.

The Challenge Cup Winners were Leigh when they beat Leeds 24–7 in the final.

There was no county league competition this season, other than a break between the 1902–03 and 1906–07 seasons, and breaks for World War I and World War II, this was the first season in which the Lancashire League and Yorkshire League titles were no longer awarded.

== Championship ==
| | Team | Pld | W | D | L | Pts |
|---|---|---|---|---|---|---|
| 1 | Wigan | 34 | 30 | 0 | 4 | 60 |
| 2 | St. Helens | 34 | 29 | 0 | 5 | 58 |
| 3 | Leeds | 34 | 28 | 0 | 6 | 56 |
| 4 | Leigh | 34 | 26 | 0 | 8 | 52 |
| 5 | Wakefield Trinity | 34 | 24 | 1 | 9 | 49 |
| 6 | Keighley | 34 | 21 | 0 | 13 | 42 |
| 7 | Salford | 34 | 20 | 1 | 13 | 41 |
| 8 | Hull | 34 | 20 | 1 | 13 | 41 |
| 9 | Workington Town | 34 | 20 | 1 | 13 | 41 |
| 10 | Halifax | 34 | 20 | 0 | 14 | 40 |
| 11 | Dewsbury | 34 | 17 | 3 | 14 | 37 |
| 12 | Castleford | 34 | 18 | 0 | 16 | 36 |
| 13 | Hull Kingston Rovers | 34 | 18 | 0 | 16 | 36 |
| 14 | Batley | 34 | 16 | 2 | 16 | 34 |
| 15 | Huddersfield | 34 | 16 | 2 | 16 | 34 |
| 16 | Oldham | 34 | 12 | 7 | 15 | 31 |
| 17 | Bramley | 34 | 15 | 1 | 18 | 31 |
| 18 | Widnes | 34 | 14 | 2 | 18 | 30 |
| 19 | York | 34 | 14 | 1 | 19 | 29 |
| 20 | Featherstone Rovers | 34 | 14 | 1 | 19 | 29 |
| 21 | Barrow | 34 | 14 | 0 | 20 | 28 |
| 22 | Warrington | 34 | 13 | 2 | 19 | 28 |
| 23 | Swinton | 34 | 13 | 0 | 21 | 26 |
| 24 | Huyton | 34 | 11 | 2 | 21 | 24 |
| 25 | Rochdale Hornets | 34 | 9 | 3 | 22 | 21 |
| 26 | Blackpool Borough | 34 | 10 | 1 | 23 | 21 |
| 27 | Bradford Northern | 34 | 8 | 2 | 24 | 18 |
| 28 | Doncaster | 34 | 7 | 3 | 24 | 17 |
| 29 | Whitehaven | 34 | 8 | 1 | 25 | 17 |
| 30 | Hunslet | 34 | 6 | 1 | 27 | 13 |

| Champions | Play-offs |

=== Play-offs ===
Round 1:

Hull 14 beat Workington Town 3.

Dewsbury 20 beat Keighley 7.

Leeds 28 beat Batley 0.

Leigh 10 beat Hull Kingston Rovers 5.

Salford 33 beat Halifax 3.

St Helens 28 beat Huddersfield 5.

Wakefield Trinity 10 beat Castleford 4.

Wigan 12 beat Oldham 7.

Round 2:

Leeds 37 beat Salford 22.

Wakefield Trinity 8 beat Leigh 5.

St Helens 30 beat Hull 5.

Wigan 36 beat Dewsbury 12.

Semi-finals:

St Helens 22 beat Leeds 7.

Wigan 49 beat Wakefield Trinity 15.

==== Final ====
22 May 1971

| St Helens | 16 – 12 | Wigan |
|---|---|---|
| Tries: Benyon, Blackwood; Goals: Coslett (5) | | Tries: Ashurst, Robinson; Goals: Ashurst (2), Tyrer |

Station Road, Swinton
Attendance: 21,745
Referee: E. Lawrinson (Warrington)
Player of the Match: Bill Ashurst

| St Helens | Number | Wigan |
|---|---|---|
| | Teams | |
| Geoff Pimblett | 1 | Colin Tyrer |
| Les Jones | 2 | Kevin O'Loughlin |
| Billy Benyon | 3 | Bill Francis |
| John Walsh | 4 | Peter Rowe |
| Bob Blackwood | 5 | Stuart Wright |
| Alan Whittle | 6 | David Hill |
| Jeff Heaton | 7 | Warren Ayres |
| John Stephens | 8 | Brian Hogan |
| Tony Karalius | 9 | Colin Clarke |
| Graham Rees | 10 | Geoff Fletcher |
| John Mantle | 11 | Bill Ashurst |
| Eric Chisnall | 12 | Dave Robinson |
| Kel Coslett | 13 | Doug Laughton |
| | Subs | |
| Ken Kelly (for Benyon) | 14 | Dave Gandy |
| Bobby Wanbon (for Rees) | 15 | Eddie Cunningham (for Robinson) |
| Jim Challinor | Coach | Eric Ashton |

== Challenge Cup ==
Leigh beat Leeds 24–7 in the Challenge Cup Final at Wembley Stadium, London on Saturday 15 May 1971, in front of a crowd of 85,514.

This was Leigh's second Cup final win in two final appearances. To date it was also their last appearance in a Challenge Cup final.

In the final, Lance Todd Trophy winner, Leigh's captain-coach, Alex Murphy, was stretchered off after a clash with Leeds player, Syd Hynes. For his part in the "clash", Hynes was sent off.

== County cups ==
Leigh beat St. Helens 7–4 to win the Lancashire County Cup, and Leeds beat Featherstone Rovers 23–7 to win the Yorkshire County Cup.

== Sources ==
- Saxton, Irvin (ed.). History of Rugby League: No.76 1970–1971. League Publications.
- 1970-71 Rugby Football League season at wigan.rlfans.com
- The Challenge Cup at The Rugby Football League website
