= 1980 New Zealand rugby league season =

Seasons
- ← 1979 1981 →

The 1980 New Zealand rugby league season was the 73rd season of rugby league that had been played in New Zealand.

== International competitions ==
New Zealand lost a series against the touring Australian side 0–2. Coached by Ces Mountford, New Zealand included; Michael O'Donnell, Kevin Fisher, Olsen Filipaina, James Leuluai, captain Dane O'Hara, Gordon Smith, Shane Varley, Mark Broadhurst, Howie and Kevin Tamati, Paul Te Ariki, Barry Edkins, Mark Graham, Graeme West, Lewis Hudson, Dennis Williams and Tony Coll. The second Test match was controlled by referee John Percival, his twenty sixth and last Test match.

The Kiwis then toured Great Britain and France, drawing both series 1-all. New Zealand were coached by Ces Mountford and included; Fred Ah Kuoi, Ray Baxendale, Mark Broadhurst, Tony Coll, Bruce Dickison, Barry Edkins, Kevin Fisher, captain Mark Graham, James Leuluai, Michael O'Donnell, Dane O'Hara, Gary Prohm, Alan Rushton, Gordon Smith, Howie and Kevin Tamati, Graeme West, Gary Kemble and John Whittaker.

Australia drew with New Zealand Māori 10-all before defeating Central Districts 23-0 and a New Zealand XIII 51–7. The New Zealand XIII included Ron O'Regan.

The South Island the upset Australia 12–11, defeating them at the Show Grounds. In the final tour game, Auckland lost to Australia 7–21 at Carlaw Park. Auckland included; Gary Kemble, Chris Jordan, Dave Lepper, captain Dennis Williams, Dane O'Hara, Ron O'Regan, John Smith, Doug Gailey, John Gordon, Pat Poasa, Tom Conroy, Alan McCarthy and Gary Prohm. Bench; Peter Simons and Ian Bell.

Mark Graham and Fred Ah Kuoi shared the New Zealand Rugby League's player of the year award.

== National competitions ==
=== Rugby League Cup ===
Canterbury held the Rugby League Cup at the end of the season, after they had defeated Wellington 20–8 in Christchurch. Wellington had earlier defended the trophy against Manawatu, Hamilton and twice against Taranaki.

Canterbury included Robin Alfeld, David Field, captain Alan Rushton, Michael O'Donnell, Mark Broadhurst and Bruce Dickison.

=== Inter-district competition ===
Central Districts won the Inter-Districts competition on count back, after they had tied on points with Auckland and the South Island.

The South Island lost to Auckland 24–19 at the Show Grounds. Central Districts defeated Auckland 22–13.

Fred Ah Kuoi played for Auckland. Barry Edkins, Mark Broadhurst, Bruce Dickison, Bernie Green, David Field, Gordon Smith, Wayne Dwyer, Alan Rushton, captain Tony Coll and Michael O'Donnell played for the South Island.

== Australasian competition ==
Auckland were eliminated in Round one of the Tooth Cup after losing 14–40 to the Western Suburbs Magpies.

== Club competitions ==
=== Auckland ===
Richmond won the Auckland Rugby League's Fox Memorial Trophy, Kiwi Shield and Rukutai Shield. Richmond defeated Otahuhu 21–15 in the final. They also shared the Stormont Shield with Manukau, who had won the Roope Rooster. Mt Albert won the Sharman Cup and Otara won the Norton Cup.

James Leuluai (Mt Wellington) won the Lipscombe Cup, Stan Martin (Richmond) won the Rothville Trophy, Gary Evans (Manukau) and Stephen Craike (Ellerslie) won the Bert Humphries Memorial, David Kerr (Mt Wellington) won the Tetley Trophy, Dennis Williams (Te Atatu) won the Painter Rosebowl Trophy and Mike McLennan (Mt Albert) won the Hyland Memorial Cup.

Eastern United, a combined senior team from the Howick and Pakuranga, were coached by Murray Eade.

=== Wellington ===
Petone won the Wellington Rugby League's Appleton Shield.

Kevin Tamati played for Upper Hutt.

=== Canterbury ===
Eastern Suburbs won the Canterbury Rugby League's Pat Smith Challenge Trophy.

=== Other Competitions ===
Hawera won the Taranaki Rugby League championship. The Waitara Bears were runner up.

Runanga defeated Marist-Western Suburbs 19–12 to win the Thacker Shield. Eastern Suburbs had relinquished the right to challenge after being upset with the refereeing in the 1979 Thacker Shield match.
