= 1980 Kangaroo tour of New Zealand =

1980 rugby league tour

The 1980 Kangaroo Tour of New Zealand was a mid-season tour of New Zealand by the Australia national rugby league team. The Australians played seven matches on tour, including a two test series against the New Zealand national rugby league team. The tour began on 1 June and finished on 17 June.

The Test matches against the Kiwis were broadcast back to New South Wales and Queensland by 0–Ten with Ray Warren in commentary. Warren was joined in the first Test call by St George centre Graham Quinn while he was joined by Kerry Boustead for the second Test. Boustead missed the second Test due to a shoulder injury picked up in the first Test and was ironically replaced on the wing by Quinn.

== Leadership ==
As he had been since 1978, Frank Stanton, in 1980 coaching at Redcliffe in the Brisbane Rugby League (BRL) competition, was the coach of the Australian team while Greek born Canterbury-Bankstwon hooker George Peponis was in his second year as Australian captain. Unfortunately due to persistent neck injuries, the second Test against New Zealand would not only be his last test as Australian captain but his last game of representative football. Peponis, a fully qualified Physician, ended his tenure as Australian Test captain with a 5–0 win–loss record.

== Touring squad ==
The 18 man squad was made up mostly of those playing in the Sydney Premiership. Although not the only Queenslander in the squad (there was also Kerry Boustead, Rod Morris and Rod Reddy), Chris Close was the sole player selected from Queensland, prior to his Man of the Match performance in the experimental 1980 State of Origin game. In his first game against the NZ Māori, Close was sent-off.

* Tests and (as sub) not included in Games total.

Player	Club	Position(s)	Games (as sub)	Tests (as sub)	Tries	Goals	F/Goals	Points
Chris Anderson	Canterbury-Bankstown	Wing	4	2	2	0	0	6
Kerry Boustead	Eastern Suburbs	Wing	(1)	1	1	0	0	3
Les Boyd	Manly-Warringah	Second-row, Wing	3 (1)	2	2	0	0	6
Greg Brentnall	Canterbury-Bankstown	Centre, Wing, Fullback	5	2	3	0	0	9
Chris Close	Redcliffe	Centre	3 (1)	–	3	0	0	9
Michael Cronin	Parramatta	Centre	3	2	2	22	0	50
Garry Dowling	Parramatta	Fullback	3	2	2	0	0	6
Jim Leis	Western Suburbs	Lock, Centre	2	–	0	0	0	0
Steve Martin	Manly-Warringah	Five-eighth, Halfback	3 (1)	–	1	0	0	3
Rod Morris	Balmain	Prop	3	2	0	0	0	0
George Peponis (c)	Canterbury-Bankstown	Hooker	1	2	1	0	0	3
Ray Price	Parramatta	Lock	4	2	0	0	0	0
Graham Quinn	St George	Centre, Wing	5	1	4	6	0	24
Tommy Raudonikis	Newtown	Halfback	4	2	1	0	0	3
Rod Reddy	St George	Second-row	4	2	4	0	0	12
Alan Thompson	Manly-Warringah	Five-eighth	2 (1)	2	0	0	0	0
Graeme Wynn	St George	Second-row	3 (1)	–	1	3	0	9
Craig Young	St George	Prop	3 (1)	2	1	0	0	3

== Tour ==
The Australian's played seven games on the tour, winning five, losing one with one drawn game.

=== 1st Test ===
Sunday 1 June

New Zealand	6 – 27	Australia
Tries: Goals: Michael O'Donnell (3/4)		Tries: Alan Thompson (2); Craig Young; Kerry Boustead; Rod Reddy; Goals: Michael Cronin (6/8)

Carlaw Park, Auckland
Attendance: 12,321
Referee: Kevin Steele (New Zealand)
Player of the Match: Tommy Raudonikis

New Zealand	Australia

FB	1	Michael O'Donnell
RW	2	Kevin Fisher
CE	3	Olsen Filipaina
CE	4	James Leuluai
LW	5	Dane O'Hara
FE	6	Gordon Smith
HB	7	Shane Varley
PR	8	Mark Broadhurst
HK	9	Howie Tamati
PR	10	Paul Te Ariki
SR	11	Kevin Tamati
SR	12	Barry Edkins
LK	13	Mark Graham (c)
Substitutions:
IC	14	Lewis Hudson
IC	15	Graeme West
Coach:
(New Zealand) Ces Mountford

FB	1	Garry Dowling
LW	2	Kerry Boustead
CE	3	Michael Cronin
CE	4	Greg Brentnall
RW	5	Chris Anderson
FE	6	Alan Thompson
HB	7	Tommy Raudonikis
PR	8	Craig Young
HK	9	George Peponis (c)
PR	12	Rod Morris
SR	11	Rod Reddy
SR	12	Les Boyd
LK	13	Ray Price
Substitutions:
IC	14
IC	15
Coach:
(Australia) Frank Stanton

Wednesday 4 June

New Zealand Māori	10 – 10	Australia
Tries: James Leuluai, Kevin Tamati; Goals: Dennis Williams (2)		Tries: Graham Quinn, Chris Close; Goals: Graeme Wynn (2)

Tomoana Showgrounds, Hastings
Attendance: 5,000
Referee: John Percival

Māori: James Leuluai, Lou Kapa, John Smith, Dennis Williams (c), Ron Siulepa, Ray Harris, Dennis Key, Rick Muru, Howie Tamati, Warren Rangi, Pat Poasa, Kevin Tamati, Ian Bell. Reserves – Bart Herangi. Coach – Tom Newton

Australia: Garry Dowling, Chris Anderson, Graham Quinn, Chris Close, Greg Brentnall, Steve Martin, Tommy Raudonikis (c), Rohan Hancock, John Lang, Rod Morris, Rod Reddy, Graeme Wynn, Jim Leis. Reserves – Kerry Boustead, Craig Young

Friday 6 June

Central Districts	0 – 23	Australia
Tries: Goals:		Tries: Graham Quinn (2), Rohan Hancock, Greg Brentnall, Graeme Wynn; Goals: Michael Cronin (4)

Basin Reserve, Wellington
Attendance: 4,000

Central Districts: Paul Christensen, Lou Kapa, John Whittaker (c), Gary Butler, Nolan Tupaea, Lance Pupuke, Monty Henry, Paul Te Ariki, Howie Tamati, Whetu Henry, Eddie Allbright, Bruce Gall, Victor Bracken. Reserves – John Knuckey, Mike Butler. Coach –

Australia: Garry Dowling, Chris Anderson, Greg Brentnall, Michael Cronin, Graham Quinn, Alan Thompson (c), Steve Martin, Rohan Hancock, John Lang, Craig Young, Les Boyd, Rod Reddy, Ray Price. Reserves – Chris Close, Graeme Wynn

Sunday 8 June

New Zealand XIII	7 – 51	Australia
Tries: Ron O'Regan; Goals: Gary Kemble (2)		Tries: Greg Brentnall (2), Chris Close (2), Rod Reddy (2), Chris Anderson, Les Boyd, George Peponis, Graham Quinn, Tommy Raudonikis; Goals: Michael Cronin (9)

Addington Showgound, Christchurch
Attendance: 6,000
Referee: Don Wilson (New Zealand)

New Zealand XIII: Gary Kemble, Dick Uluave, Lewis Hudson, Ron O'Regan, Mark Petersen, Chris Menzies, Daryl Morrison, Danny Campbell, Paul Ravlich, Alan Rushton, Tony Coll (c), Graeme West, Gary Prohm. Reserves – Billy Kells, Owen Wright. Coach – Neville Denton

Australia: Greg Brentnall, Chris Anderson, Chris Close, Michael Cronin, Graham Quinn, Alan Thompson, Tommy Raudonikis, Rod Morris, George Peponis (c), Craig Young, Les Boyd, Rod Reddy, Ray Price. Reserves – Steve Martin, Graeme Wynn

Wednesday 11 June

South Island	12 – 11	Australia
Tries: Kevin Franklin, Paul McCone; Goals: Barry Edkins (2); Michael O'Donnell (1)		Tries: Garry Dowling (2), Chris Anderson; Goals: Graeme Wynn (1)

Addington Showgound, Christchurch
Attendance: 3,000
Referee: Earle Pilcher

South Island: Michael O'Donnell, Michael Williams, Bruce Dickinson, Bernard Green, Paul McCone, Chris Menzies, Gordon Smith, Mark Broadhurst, Paul Truscott, Alan Rushton, Kevin Franklin, Tony Coll (c), Barry Edkins. Reserves – David Field, Wayne Dwyer. Coach – Cecil Clark

Australia: Garry Dowling, Graham Quinn, Chris Close, Greg Brentnall, Chris Anderson, Steve Martin, Tommy Raudonikis (c), Rod Morris, John Lang, Rohan Hancock, Jim Leis, Graeme Wynn, Ray Price. Reserves – Alan Thompson, Les Boyd

=== 2nd Test ===
Sunday 15 June

New Zealand	6 – 15	Australia
Tries: Goals: Michael O'Donnell (3/5)		Tries: Les Boyd; Michael Cronin; Rod Reddy; Goals: Michael Cronin (3/4)

Carlaw Park, Auckland
Attendance: 9,706
Referee: John Percival (New Zealand)

New Zealand	Australia

FB	1	Michael O'Donnell
RW	2	Kevin Fisher
CE	3	Olsen Filipaina
CE	4	James Leuluai
LW	5	Dane O'Hara
FE	6	Dennis Williams
HB	7	Gordon Smith
PR	8	Mark Broadhurst
HK	9	Howie Tamati
PR	10	Kevin Tamati
SR	11	Tony Coll
SR	12	Barry Edkins
LK	13	Mark Graham (c)
Substitutions:
IC	14
IC	15	Graeme West
Coach:
(New Zealand) Ces Mountford

FB	1	Garry Dowling
LW	2	Graham Quinn
CE	3	Michael Cronin
CE	4	Greg Brentnall
RW	5	Chris Anderson
FE	6	Alan Thompson
HB	7	Tommy Raudonikis
PR	8	Craig Young
HK	9	George Peponis (c)
PR	10	Rod Morris
SR	11	Rod Reddy
SR	12	Les Boyd
LK	13	Ray Price
Substitutions:
IC	14
IC	15
Coach:
(Australia) Frank Stanton

Australian winger Kerry Boustead suffered a shoulder injury in the first test that kept him out of the second test. St George centre Graham Quinn came in onto the wing for his only Test match. Boustead spent the game in the 0–Ten commentary booth calling the game for Australian television next to chief commentator Ray Warren.

Tuesday 17 July

Auckland	7 – 21	Australia
Tries: Dave Lepper; Goals: Chris Jordan (2)		Tries: Michael Cronin, Steve Martin, Goals: Graham Quinn (6)

Carlaw Park, Auckland
Attendance: 14,000
Referee: Bob Cooper (New Zealand)
Player of the Match: Ray Price

Auckland: Gary Kemble, Chris Jordan, James Leuluai, Dennis Williams (c), Dane O'Hara, Ron O'Regan, John Smith, Doug Gailey, John Gordon, Pat Poasa, Tom Conroy, Alan McCarthy, Gary Prohm. Reserves – Ian Bell, Dave Lepper. Coach – Don Hammond

Australia: Greg Brentnall, Graham Quinn, Michael Cronin, Jim Leis, Les Boyd, Steve Martin, Tommy Raudonikis, John Lang, Craig Young, Rod Reddy, Graeme Wynn, Ray Price (c). Reserves –

== Statistics ==
Leading Try Scorer

- 4 by Rod Reddy and Graham Quinn

Leading Point Scorer

- 50 by Michael Cronin (2 tries, 22 goals)

Largest Test Attendance

- 12,321 – First test vs New Zealand at Carlaw Park

Largest non-test Attendance

- 14,000 – Australia vs Auckland at Carlaw Park
