= 1981 New Zealand rugby league season =

Seasons
- ← 1980 1982 →

The 1981 New Zealand rugby league season was the 74th season of rugby league that had been played in New Zealand.

== International competitions ==
New Zealand defeated France twice. New Zealand included; Fred Ah Kuoi, Ray Baxendale, Mark Broadhurst, Tony Coll, Olsen Filipaina, captain Mark Graham, James Leuluai, Michael O'Donnell, Dane O'Hara, Gary Prohm, Alan Rushton, Howie and Kevin Tamati, Shane Varley, Graeme West, Dennis Williams and Wally Wilson.

The South Island lost to France 16–12 at the Addington Showgrounds. The South Island included Bernie Green, captain Ray Baxendale, Wayne Dwyer, Barry Edkins and Wayne Wallace. France also defeated Central Districts, New Zealand Māori and Northern Districts. Auckland defeated France 20–10 at Carlaw Park. Auckland included; Nick Wright, Gary Prohm, Marcus Pouesi, James Leuluai, Dane O'Hara, Ron O'Regan, captain Shane Varley, Lyndsay Proctor, Les Beehre, Pat Poasa, Kevin Schaumkel, Tom Conroy and Ian Bell. Reserves; Gary Kemble and Mark Gillespie.

Graeme West won the New Zealand Rugby League's player of the year award.

== National competitions ==
=== Rugby League Cup ===
Canterbury held the Rugby League Cup at the end of the season. They defended the trophy 31–30 against Northland, scoring as the final hooter sounded, the West Coast 13-10 and Wellington 16–12.

Canterbury included Barry Edkins, Alan Rushton and David Field.

=== Inter-district competition ===
The South Island won the Inter-Districts competition on count back.

Auckland defeated the South Island 28–27. Central Districts defeated Auckland 19–10.

The South Island included; Michael O'Donnel, David Field, Wally Wilson, Ray Baxendale, Wayne Wallace, Barry Edkins and Alan Rushton.

Graeme West played for Taranaki and Central Districts.

== Australasian competition ==
Central Districts were eliminated after two Rounds of the Tooth Cup after losing 51–11 to the Manly-Warringah Sea Eagles and 31–5 to the Penrith Panthers.

== Club competitions ==
=== Auckland ===
Mt Albert won the Auckland Rugby League's Fox Memorial Trophy, Rukutai Shield, Stormont Shield and Kiwi Shield. They defeated Glenora 18–7 in the Fox Memorial Grand Final. Otahuhu won the Roope Rooster, Ellerslie won the Sharman Cup and Richmond won the Norton Cup.

John Ackland (Mt Albert) won the Lipscombe Cup, Ron O'Regan (City Newton) won the Rothville Trophy, Kevin Schaumkel (Glenora) and Marcus Pouesi (Mt Albert) won the Bert Humphries Memorial, Emil Vaafusuaga (Otahuhu) and Dean Bell (Manukau) shared the Tetley Trophy, Dennis Williams (Glenora) won the Painter Rosebowl Trophy and Mike McClennan (Mt Albert) won the Hyland Memorial Cup.

Dennis Williams joined the Glenora Bears. Graham Mattson was the head coach of the new Papatoetoe Panthers club, also serving on their inaugural committee.

Eastern United, a combined senior team from the Howick and Pakuranga, were coached by Murray Eade. After a poor season, he was replaced at the end of the year.

=== Wellington ===
Petone won the Wellington Rugby League's Appleton Shield.

Kevin Tamati played for Randwick.

=== Canterbury ===
Eastern Suburbs won the Canterbury Rugby League's Pat Smith Challenge Trophy.

=== Other Competitions ===
Western Suburbs won the Taranaki Rugby League championship.
