= 1979 New Zealand rugby league season =

Seasons
- ← 1978 1980 →

The 1979 New Zealand rugby league season was the 72nd season of rugby league that had been played in New Zealand.

== International competitions ==
New Zealand lost a series to Great Britain 1–2. New Zealand were coached by Ces Mountford and included; Mark Broadhurst, third Test captain Fred Ah Kuoi, Tony Coll, Warren Collicoat, Barry Edkins, Olsen Filipaina, Kevin Fisher, Mark Graham, Lewis Hudson, James Leuluai, Dane O'Hara, Paul Ravlich, Gordon Smith, John Smith, Dane Sorensen, Howie and Kevin Tamati, Dick Uluave, first and second Test captain Graeme West and Shane Varley.

The Lions match against Canterbury was cancelled due to flooded fields at the Addington Showgrounds and the need to get the ground prepared for the second Test. Auckland lost to Great Britain 10–18 in the Lions final match on tour in front of 12,500 fans at Carlaw Park. Auckland included Gary Kemble, James Leuluai, Olsen Filipaina, Ken Andersson, Toa Fepuleai, captain Fred Ah Kuoi, Shane Varley, Wayne Robertson, Murray Netzler, Doug Gailey, Alan McCarthy, Owen Wright and Gary Prohm.

The Otahuhu Leopards defeated the New South Wales Rugby League's Cronulla-Sutherland Sharks 8–2 at Carlaw Park.

The Auckland under 19 side toured New South Wales.

Fred Ah Kuoi won the New Zealand Rugby League's player of the year award.

== National competitions ==
=== Rugby League Cup ===
Taranaki held the Rugby League Cup at the end of the season.

=== Inter-district competition ===
Central Districts won the Inter-Districts competition, defeating Auckland 26–18, the South Island 21-16 and Northern Districts 22–12.

The South Island defeated Auckland 11–10 at Carlaw Park. Auckland defeated Northern Districts 22–12. The South Island defeated Northern Districts 42–8.

Central Districts included Howie and Kevin Tamati, Graeme West, Bruce Gall and Warren Collicoat.

==== Seasons Standings ====
Team	Pld	W	L	PF	PA	Pts
Central Districts	3	3	0	69	46	6
South Island	3	2	1	69	39	4
Auckland	3	1	2	50	49	2
Northern Districts	3	0	3	32	86	0

=== District competition ===
Auckland won the Rothmans trophy, defeating the West Coast 43–19 at Carlaw Park in the final.

The West Coast defeated Canterbury at Wingham Park.

Fred Ah Kuoi, Olsen Filipaina, Shane Varley, Toa Fepuleai and Gary Kemble played for Auckland, who were coached by Don Hammond.

Canterbury included Robin Alfeld, Lewis Hudson, Michael O'Donnell, Bob Jarvis, captain Wally Wilson, Alan Rushton, Wayne Wallace, Barry Edkins and Mark Broadhurst.

== Australasian competition ==
Auckland failed to make the semi-finals of the Amco Cup after losing 5–12 to the Penrith Panthers, 3–12 to the Canterbury-Bankstown Bulldogs and 10–30 to the Cronulla Sharks. Canterbury 12 (McCartney, McDonald tries, McDonald 3 goals) d Auckland 3 (Varley try) at Leichhardt Oval. Wednesday 30 May 1979. Crowd: 3,000. Referee – Gary Cook.

== Club competitions ==
=== Auckland ===
Richmond won the Auckland Rugby League's Fox Memorial Trophy and Stormont Shield. They defeated Otahuhu 16–15 in the Fox final. Otahuhu won the Rukutai Shield and Kiwi Shield while Glenora won the Roope Rooster, Northcote won the Sharman Cup and Glenora Corona won the Norton Cup.

Wayne Robertson (Te Atatu) won the Best and Fairest award. Paul Bridges (Mt Albert) won the Lipscombe Cup, Fred Ah Kuoi (Richmond) won the Rothville Trophy, Alan McCarthy (Ponsonby Marist) and James Leuluai (Mt Wellington) won the Bert Humphries Memorial, Olsen Filipaina (Mangere East) won both the Tetley Trophy and Painter Rosebowl Trophy and Joe Gwynne (Richmond) won the Hyland Memorial Cup.

The Mt Roskill Red Devils and the Blockhouse Bay Cougars started discussion in 1979 on amalgamation (under direction of the Auckland Rugby League) and in October 1979 the amalgamation papers were signed, forming the Bay Roskill Vikings.

Richmond were coached by Joe Gwynne. Eastern United, a combined senior team from the Howick and Pakuranga, finished the season undefeated in the second division with only three draws. The team was coached by Murray Eade and included Paul Matete.

=== Wellington ===
Upper Hutt won the Wellington Rugby League's Appleton Shield.

Kevin Tamati played for Upper Hutt.

=== Canterbury ===
Eastern Suburbs won the Canterbury Rugby League's Pat Smith Challenge Trophy.

Halswell played its first season in premier grade.

=== Other Competitions ===
The Waitara Bears won the Taranaki Rugby League championship. Hawera were the runners up

Runanga defeated Eastern Suburbs 10–6 in Greymouth to win the Thacker Shield. Eastern Suburbs were so upset with the refereeing that they relinquished the right to challenge in 1980.
