= 1982 New Zealand rugby league tour of Australia and Papua New Guinea =

The 1982 New Zealand rugby league tour of Australia and Papua New Guinea was a four match tour by the New Zealand national rugby league team. The New Zealand national rugby league team lost a series 0-2 against Australia, but defeated Papua New Guinea in a one-off test match. Their only other game was a match against Queensland.

== Background ==
New Zealand last toured Australia in 1978 while this would be their second trip to Papua New Guinea having played a test against the Kumuls in Port Moresby in 1978.

== Squad ==
The New Zealand squad was chosen from those playing in the NZ, Australia and English competitions. The coach was Cecil Mountford with the captain being Hawera's giant back row forward Graeme West, although North Sydney's Mark Graham would captain the team in the tests against Australia.

The Kiwis were without the services of fiery Cronulla-Sutherland brothers Dane and Kurt Sorensen after the cash strapped Sharks refused to release them for test duty.

Name	Games	Tests	Tries	Goals	FGs	Points	Club
Fred Ah Kuoi	2	2	0	0	0	0	North Sydney Bears
Mark Broadhurst	3	3	0	0	0	0	Manly-Warringah Sea Eagles
Tony Coll	2	1	0	1	0	2	Marist Saints (NZ)
Wayne Dwyer	0	0	0	0	0	0	Marist Saints (NZ)
David Field	0	0	0	0	0	0	
Olsen Filipaina	2	2	0	0	0	0	Balmain Tigers
Kevin Fisher	2	1	2	0	0	6	Huntly South (NZ)
Clayton Friend	2	1	1	0	0	3	Carlisle RLFC
Bruce Gall	4	3	1	0	0	3	Taranaki Wildcats (NZ)
Mark Gillespie	0	0	0	0	0	0	
Mark Graham (vc)	2	2	0	0	0	0	North Sydney Bears
John Griffin	0	0	0	0	0	0	South Island (NZ)
Lewis Hudson	0	0	0	0	0	0	Linwood Keas (NZ)
Gary Kemble	3	2	1	0	0	3	Hull F.C.
James Leuluai	4	3	3	0	0	9	Mount Wellington (NZ)
Hugh McGahan	2	1	2	0	0	6	Otahuhu Leopards (NZ)
Peter Mellars	1	0	0	0	0	0	Wellington (NZ)
Dane O'Hara	4	3	1	0	0	3	Hull F.C.
Gary Prohm	4	3	1	0	0	3	Hull Kingston Rovers
Gordon Smith	4	3	1	16	0	35	Hull Kingston Rovers
Gerard Stokes	0	0	0	0	0	0	Eastern Suburbs (NZ)
Howie Tamati	4	3	1	0	0	3	Waitara Bears (NZ)
Kevin Tamati	4	3	1	0	0	3	Randwick (NZ)
Shane Varley	0	0	0	0	0	0	Workington Town
Graeme West (c)	3	2	1	0	0	3	Hawera Hawks (NZ)
John Whittaker	1	0	0	0	0	0	Randwick (NZ)
Owen Wright	1	1	0	0	0	0	Otahuhu Leopards (NZ)

== Australia ==
Sunday, 27 June

Queensland	31 – 16	New Zealand
Tries: Wayne Challis, Brad Backer, Tony Currie, Wally Lewis, Mal Meninga; Goals: Mal Meninga (5)		Tries: Gary Kemble, James Leuluai, Dane O'Hara, Gordon Smith; Goals: Gordon Smith (2)

Lang Park, Brisbane
Attendance: 12,000
Referee: Eddie Ward

Queensland: Tony Currie, Brad Backer, Gene Miles, Mal Meninga, Wayne Challis, Wally Lewis (c), Mark Murray, Rod Morris, Greg Conescu, Paul Khan, Rohan Hancock, Bryan Neibling, Norm Carr. Res - Cavill Heugh, Greg Holben. Coach - Arthur Beetson

New Zealand: Gary Kemble, Gary Prohm, John Whittaker, James Leuluai, Dane O'Hara, Gordon Smith, Clayton Friend, Bruce Gall, Howie Tamati, Kevin Tamati, Graeme West (c), Tony Coll, Hugh McGahan. Res - Kevin Fisher, Peter Mellars

In the first game on the Australian leg of the tour, the Kiwis faced an almost test strength Queensland side, losing 31–16 at Lang Park.

=== First Test ===
The Australian's escaped with an 11-8 win over New Zealand at Lang Park in Brisbane. The forced retirement due to a chronic knee injury of Canterbury-Bankstown's George Peponis saw Manly-Warringah's Max Krilich named as both Australian hooker and new team captain. Red headed Manly-Warringah and Queensland back rower Paul Vautin made his test debut at lock forward in place of an injured Ray Price. Queensland's Warwick Wattles forward Rohan Hancock made his debut in the second row while both of Australia's reserves, Parramatta Eels back rower John Muggleton and Brisbane Souths heavyweight centre Mal Meninga (who would not get on the field during the game) were also on their test debuts. For New Zealand, Taranaki back rower Bruce Gall was also making his test match debut as was Otahuhu Leopards forward and future New Zealand test captain Hugh McGahan who, like future Australian test captain Meninga, would not get on the field during the game.

Saturday 3 July

Australia	11 – 8	New Zealand
Tries: John Muggleton; Goals: Michael Cronin (4)		Tries: Goals: Gordon Smith (4)

Lang Park, Brisbane
Attendance: 11,400
Referee: Fred Lindop (United Kingdom)
Player of the Match: Wally Lewis

Australia	New Zealand

FB	1	Greg Brentnall
LW	2	John Ribot
CE	3	Michael Cronin
CE	4	Steve Rogers
RW	5	Kerry Boustead
FE	6	Wally Lewis
HB	7	Steve Mortimer
LK	8	Paul Vautin
SR	9	Les Boyd
SR	10	Rohan Hancock
PR	11	Rod Morris
HK	12	Max Krilich (c)
PR	13	Craig Young
Substitutions:
IC	14	John Muggleton
IC	15	Mal Meninga
Coach:
(Australia) Frank Stanton

FB	1	Gary Kemble
LW	2	Gary Prohm
CE	3	Olsen Filipaina
CE	4	James Leuluai
RW	5	Dane O'Hara
FE	6	Fred Ah Kuoi
HB	7	Gordon Smith
LK	8	Mark Graham (c)
SR	9	Bruce Gall
SR	10	Graeme West
PR	11	Kevin Tamati
HK	12	Howie Tamati
PR	13	Mark Broadhurst
Substitutions:
IC	14	Hugh McGahan
IC	15	John Whittaker
Coach:
(New Zealand) Cecil Mountford

English referee Fred Lindop had what the press termed a "Love affair with his whistle" and blew 44 penalties during the game. New Zealand led for most of the game through the boot of Gordon Smith, though with the number of penalties gave Michael Cronin ample opportunity to tie the game at 8-all late in the second half. Only a late John Muggleton try gave the Aussies their win. Of Lindop's 44 penalties, New Zealand won the count 25-19. There were only 7 decisive scrums in the game with Lindop blowing a penalty to end most of them.

Australian debutant second rower Rohan Hancock 's first touch of the ball saw him knocked senseless in a crunching full body tackle by Kiwi hardman prop Kevin Tamati.

=== Second Test ===
Australia wrapped up the Trans-Tasman series 2-0 with a 20-2 win over the Kiwis at the Sydney Cricket Ground.

Saturday 17 July

Australia	20 – 2	New Zealand
Tries: Greg Brentnall; Ray Price; Kerry Boustead; Wally Lewis; Goals: Michael Cronin (4)		Tries: Goals: Gordon Smith (1)

Sydney Cricket Ground, Sydney
Attendance: 16,775
Referee: Fred Lindop (United Kingdom)
Player of the Match: Ray Price

Australia	New Zealand

FB	1	Greg Brentnall
LW	2	John Ribot
CE	3	Michael Cronin
CE	4	Mal Meninga
RW	5	Kerry Boustead
FE	6	Wally Lewis
HB	7	Steve Mortimer
LK	8	Ray Price
SR	9	Les Boyd
SR	10	John Muggleton
PR	11	Craig Young
HK	12	Max Krilich (c)
PR	13	Rohan Hancock
Substitutions:
IC	14	Steve Rogers
IC	15	Rod Morris
Coach:
(Australia) Frank Stanton

FB	1	Gary Kemble
LW	2	Gary Prohm
CE	3	Olsen Filipaina
CE	4	James Leuluai
RW	5	Dane O'Hara
FE	6	Fred Ah Kuoi
HB	7	Gordon Smith
LK	8	Mark Graham (c)
SR	9	Bruce Gall
SR	10	Graeme West
PR	11	Kevin Tamati
HK	12	Howie Tamati
PR	13	Mark Broadhurst
Substitutions:
IC	14	John Whittaker
IC	15	Hugh McGahan
Coach:
(New Zealand) Cecil Mountford

Although Ray Price was named as the Man of the Match, the game was a personal triumph for Australian halfback Steve Mortimer who controlled the play and led the Aussies to a 20-2 win.

Giant Queensland centre Mal Meninga, after not being used off the bench in the first test, made his official test debut in this game in place of Steve Rogers who moved to the bench. Meninga had an unhappy game though, dislocating his elbow in the 28th minute after a crunching blindside tackle from Kiwi winger Dane O'Hara, while at the same time attempting to break a tackle from Kiwi fullback Gary Kemble. The other major change for the Australians was Ray Price returning to the side at lock for Paul Vautin.

== Papua New Guinea ==
Sunday 25 July

Papua New Guinea	5 – 56	New Zealand
Tries: Alan Rero Goals: Poka Kila (1)		Tries: Kevin Fisher (2); James Leuluai (2); Hugh McGahan (2); Clayton Friend; Bruce Gall; Gary Prohm; Howie Tamati; Kevin Tamati; Graeme West; Goals: Gordon Smith (9); Tony Coll (1)

Lloyd Robson Oval, Port Moresby
Attendance: 13,000
Referee: John Gocher (Australia)

Papua New Guinea	New Zealand

FB	1	Kungas Kuveu
RW	2	Alan Rero
CE	3	Y. Pilkokos
CE	4	Jimmy Peter
LW	5	Samu Sasama
FE	6	Jon Joseph
HB	7	Poka Kila
LK	8	John Wagambie (c)
SR	9	Jack Waninara
SR	10	Arebo Taumaku
PR	11	Philip Ralda
HK	12	J. Tenakanai
PR	13	Tara Gau
Substitutions:
IC	14	Joe Tep
IC	15	Joe Katsir
Coach:
(Papua New Guinea) Uve Sabumei

FB	1	James Leuluai
LW	2	Kevin Fisher
CE	3	Gary Prohm
CE	4	John Whittaker
RW	5	Dane O'Hara
FE	6	Gordon Smith
HB	7	Clayton Friend
LK	8	Hugh McGahan
SR	9	Bruce Gall
SR	10	Graeme West (c)
PR	11	Kevin Tamati
HK	12	Howie Tamati
PR	13	Mark Broadhurst
Substitutions:
IC	14	Owen Wright
IC	15	Tony Coll
Coach:
(New Zealand) Cecil Mountford
