= 1982 New Zealand rugby league season =

Seasons
- 1981 1983

The 1982 New Zealand rugby league season was the 75th season of rugby league that had been played in New Zealand.

== International competitions ==
New Zealand toured Australia and Papua New Guinea. The Kiwis lost the series 0–2 to Australia but defeated Papua New Guinea 56–5. New Zealand were coached by Ces Mountford and included; Gary Kemble, Gary Prohm, James Leuluai, Olsen Filipaina, Dane O'Hara, Fred Ah Kuoi, Gordon Smith, Howie and Kevin Tamati, Mark Broadhurst, PNG Test captain Graeme West, Bruce Gall, Australian Test captain Mark Graham, John Whittaker, Hugh McGahan, Kevin Fisher, Clayton Friend, Owen Wright and Tony Coll.

Mark Graham won the New Zealand Rugby League's player of the year award.

== National competitions ==
=== Rugby League Cup ===
Wellington held the Rugby League Cup at the end of the season after they defeated Canterbury 26–12. Canterbury had earlier successfully defended it against the West Coast 39–16.

=== Inter-district competition ===
Central Districts won the Inter-Districts competition.

Central Districts defeated Auckland 10–9.

=== National Club competition ===
Petone won the Wrangler Cup, defeating Randwick 16–14 in the final.

Otahuhu defeated Addington and Western Suburbs (Taranaki) before losing to Petone 9–8 in a semifinal. Randwick had defeated Glenora 8–5 in the first round.

== Australasian competition ==
The South Island were eliminated after two Rounds of the KB Cup after losing 47–15 to the Canberra Raiders and 34–3 to the Brisbane Broncos.

== Club competitions ==
=== Auckland ===
Mount Albert won the Auckland Rugby League's Fox Memorial Trophy, defeating Otahuhu 18–8 in the final. Otahuhu won the Roope Rooster, Stormont Shield and Kiwi Shield. Glenora won the Rukutai Shield and Norton Cup. Mangere East won the Sharman Cup.

Hugh McGahan (Otahuhu) won the Lipscombe Cup and Bert Humphries Memorial (forward), Owen Wright (Otahuhu) won the Rothville Trophy, Clayton Friend (Manukau) won the Bert Humphries Memorial (back), Fred Muller (Otahuhu) won the Tetley Trophy, Billy Kem (Glenora) won the Painter Rosebowl Trophy while Ian Gorden (Otahuhu) won the Hyland Memorial Cup.

Mark Bourneville played for Mount Albert.

The Hibiscus Coast Raiders were formed in 1982.

=== Wellington ===
Petone won the Wellington Rugby League's Appleton Shield.

Kevin Tamati played for Randwick.

Peter Mellars played for Petone. Nolan Tupaea played for Petone.

=== Canterbury ===
Addington won the Canterbury Rugby League's Pat Smith Challenge Trophy, defeating Hornby 11–10 in the Grand Final. Frank Endacott coached Addington while Wayne Wallace played for Hornby.

=== Other Competitions ===
Western Suburbs defeated the Waitara Bears 14–4 in the Taranaki Rugby League grand final.

John Griffin was the West Coast Rugby League player of the year in 1982.
