= 1980 New Zealand rugby league tour of Great Britain and France =

The 1980 New Zealand rugby league tour of Great Britain and France was a tour by the New Zealand national rugby league team. The test series between the New Zealand national rugby league team and Great Britain was drawn one all, as was the test series between New Zealand and France.

The Test series was broadcast across the United Kingdom via the BBC with chief commentator Eddie Waring and his co-commentator, former Great Britain halfback and then Salford coach Alex Murphy. The series was broadcast in New Zealand via Television New Zealand with former Kiwi fullback Des White providing the commentary.

== Squad ==
The touring squad was selected in September 1980. The squad was almost entirely domestic based, with captain Mark Graham the only overseas player. The team was coached by Ces Mountford.

Although not part of the original squad, Wigan prop forward Danny Campbell was selected to play in the match against Leigh due to the number of injuries suffered during the tour.

Player	Club	Position(s)	Tests	Matches	Tries	Goals	F/Goals	Points
Fred Ah Kuoi (vc)	(New Zealand) Auckland	Five-eighth, Centre	5	9	1	0	0	3
Ray Baxendale	(New Zealand) West Coast	Second-row, Lock	3	8	1	0	0	3
Mark Broadhurst	(New Zealand) Canterbury	Prop	5	9	0	0	0	0
Danny Campbell	(England) Wigan	Second-row	0	1	0	0	0	0
Tony Coll	(New Zealand) West Coast	Second-row	3	6	4	0	0	12
Bruce Dickison	(New Zealand) Canterbury	Centre	4	8	2	0	0	6
Barry Edkins	(New Zealand) Canterbury	Second-row, Lock	1	7	0	9	0	18
Kevin Fisher	(New Zealand) Waikato	Wing	1	7	0	0	0	0
Bruce Gall	(New Zealand) Taranaki	Second-row	0	8	3	0	0	9
Mark Graham (c)	(Australia) Brisbane Norths	Lock	5	6	4	0	0	12
Bernie Green	(New Zealand) West Coast	Centre	0	5	2	0	0	6
Bill Kells	(New Zealand) Waikato	Five-eighth, Halfback	0	4	0	0	0	0
Gary Kemble	(New Zealand) Auckland	Fullback, Wing	1	7	2	9	0	24
James Leuluai	(New Zealand) Auckland	Fullback, Centre, Five-eighth	3	9	3	0	0	9
Rick Muru	(New Zealand) Waikato	Prop	0	5	1	0	0	3
Michael O'Donnell	(New Zealand) Canterbury	Fullback, Centre	5	8	1	5	0	13
Dane O'Hara	(New Zealand) Auckland	Wing, Centre	5	10	6	0	0	18
Gary Prohm	(New Zealand) Auckland	Second-row, Wing	4	9	0	0	0	0
Alan Rushton	(New Zealand) Canterbury	Prop, Hooker	4	8	1	0	0	3
Gordon Smith	(New Zealand) West Coast	Halfback	4	7	1	15	0	33
Howie Tamati	(New Zealand) Taranaki	Hooker	1	9	1	0	0	3
Kevin Tamati	(New Zealand) Wellington	Prop	5	8	1	0	0	3
Paul Te Ariki	(New Zealand) Wellington	Prop, Second-row	0	6	0	0	0	0
Nolan Tupaea	(New Zealand) Wellington	Five-eighth, Centre	0	6	3	0	0	9
Shane Varley	(New Zealand) Auckland	Halfback	0	7	1	0	0	3
Graeme West	(New Zealand) Taranaki	Second-row	5	9	2	0	0	6
John Whittaker	(New Zealand) Wellington	Centre	4	9	2	0	0	6

== Great Britain ==
=== Test Venues ===
The three tests took place at the following venues.

Wigan	Bradford	Leeds
Central Park	Odsal Stadium	Elland Road
Capacity: 35,000	Capacity: 40,000	Capacity: 32,500

Sunday 28 September

Blackpool Borough	5 – 23	New Zealand
Tries: Michael Chester; Goals: William Oxley (1)		Tries: James Leuluai (2), Bruce Dickison, Rick Muru, Nolan Tupaea; Goals: Gary Kemble (4)

Borough Park, Blackpool
Attendance: 1,312
Referee: Ron Moore

Blackpool Borough: Ron Oldham, Michael Chester, Steve Tilly, John Heritage, William Oxley, James Arnold, James Green, Paul Gamble, Don Parry, John Waterworth, Peter Frodsham, Philip Holmes, John Corcoran. Res – Kevin Hanley. Coach – Geoff Lyon

New Zealand: James Leuluai, Bernie Green, John Whittaker, Bruce Dickison, Gary Kemble, Nolan Tupaea, Shane Varley, Rick Muru, Howie Tamati, Kevin Tamati, Ray Baxendale, Bruce Gall, Barry Edkins. Res – Gary Prohm

Sunday 5 October

Hull F.C.	10 – 33	New Zealand
Tries: Vince Farrar, Tim Wilby; Goals: Sammy Lloyd (2)		Tries: Tony Coll (2), Mark Graham (2), Dane O'Hara (2), Alan Rushton, Gordon Smith, Kevin Tamati; Goals: Michael O'Donnell (3)

Boothferry Park, Kingston upon Hull
Attendance: 15,945
Referee: Billy Thompson

Hull F.C.: George Robinson, Graham Walters, Chris Harrison, Tim Wilby, Paul Prendiville, Ian Wilson, Clive Pickerill, Keith Tindall, Ian Crowther, Vince Farrar, Charles Birdsall, Keith Boxall, Sammy Lloyd. Res – Robert Gaitley, Charlie Stone. Coach – Arthur Bunting

New Zealand: Michael O'Donnell, Kevin Fisher, James Leuluai, Bruce Dickison, Dane O'Hara, Fred Ah Kuoi, Gordon Smith, Mark Broadhurst, Alan Rushton, Kevin Tamati, Graeme West, Tony Coll, Mark Graham (c). Res – John Whittaker, Paul Te Ariki

Wednesday 8 October

Cumbria	9 – 3	New Zealand
Tries: Arnie Walker; Goals: Ian Ball (3)		Tries: Graeme West; Goals:

Recreation Ground, Whitehaven
Attendance: 4,070
Referee: Harry Hunt

Cumbria: Steve Tickle, John Bulman, Peter Stoddart, Ian Ball, Chris Camilleri, Ian Rudd, Arnie Walker, Terry Bowman, Alan McCurrie, John Cunningham, Vince Fox, Les Gorley, Bill Pattinson

New Zealand: Gary Kemble, Kevin Fisher, James Leuluai, Bruce Dickison, Dane O'Hara, Fred Ah Kuoi, Shane Varley, Rick Muru, Howie Tamati, Alan Rushton, Graeme West, Tony Coll, Mark Graham (c)

Sunday 12 October

St Helens	11 – 6	New Zealand
Tries: Les Jones; Goals: Clive Griffiths (4)		Tries: Bernie Green, Nolan Tupaea; Goals:

Knowsley Road, St. Helens
Attendance: 6,000
Referee: John McDonald

St Helens: Clive Griffiths, Les Jones, Denis Litherland, Roy Haggerty, Roy Mathias, Brian Parkes, Neil Holding, Mel James, Dennis Nulty, Michael Hope, Eric Chisnall, George Nicholls, Harry Pinner. Res – John Smith, Keiron Pickavance. Coach – Kel Coslett

New Zealand: James Leuluai, Bernie Green, John Whittaker, Fred Ah Kuoi, Nolan Tupaea, Bill Kells, Gordon Smith, Mark Broadhurst, Howie Tamati, Kevin Tamati, Paul Te Ariki, Bruce Gall, Gary Prohm

Tuesday 14 October

Bradford Northern	15 – 10	New Zealand
Tries: David Barends (2), Alan Parker (2); Goals: Alan Redfearn (3)		Tries: Bruce Dickison, Howie Tamati; Goals: Michael O'Donnell (2)

Odsal Stadium, Bradford
Attendance: 4,553
Referee: John McDonald

Bradford Northern: John Green, David Barends, Les Gant, Derek Parker, Alan Parker, Nigel Stephenson, Alan Redfearn, Jim Fiddler, Brian Noble, Phil Sanderson, Dennis Trotter, Gary Van Bellen, Graham Idle. Res – Stephen Ferres, Gary Hale. Coach – Peter Fox

New Zealand: Michael O'Donnell, Bernie Green, John Whittaker, Bruce Dickison, Gary Kemble, Nolan Tupaea, Bill Kells, Paul Te Ariki, Howie Tamati, Ray Baxendale, Bruce Gall, Gary Prohm, Barry Edkins

=== First Test ===
Saturday 18 October

Great Britain	14 – 14	New Zealand
Tries: Chris Camilleri; Mike Smith; Goals: George Fairbairn (4)		Tries: Fred Ah Kuoi; Tony Coll; Goals: Gordon Smith (4/5)

Central Park, Wigan
Attendance: 7,031
Referee: Billy Thompson (England)
Player of the Match: Fred Ah Kuoi

Great Britain	New Zealand

FB	1	George Fairbairn (c)
RW	2	Chris Camilleri
RC	3	John Joyner
LC	4	Mike Smith
LW	5	Keith Bentley
SO	6	Steve Hartley
SH	7	Kevin Dick
PR	8	Roy Holdstock
HK	9	David Watkinson
PR	10	Trevor Skerrett
SR	11	Jeff Grayshon
SR	12	Les Gorley
LF	13	Len Casey
Substitutions:
IC	14
IC	15	Harry Pinner
Coach:
(England) Johnny Whiteley

FB	1	Michael O'Donnell
RW	2	Kevin Fisher
RC	3	James Leuluai
LC	4	Bruce Dickison
LW	5	Dane O'Hara
FE	6	Fred Ah Kuoi
HB	7	Gordon Smith
PR	8	Mark Broadhurst
HK	9	Alan Rushton
PR	10	Kevin Tamati
SR	11	Graeme West
SR	12	Tony Coll
LK	13	Mark Graham (c)
Substitutions:
IC	14	Ray Baxendale
IC	15
Coach:
(New Zealand) Ces Mountford

Wednesday 22 October

Hull Kingston Rovers	12 – 20	New Zealand
Tries: Paul Harkin, Phil Lowe; Goals: Phil Hogan (2); Steve Hubbard (1)		Tries: Bruce Gall (3), John Whittaker; Goals: Barry Edkins (3); Gary Kemble (1)

Craven Park, Kingston upon Hull
Attendance: 9,516
Referee: Fred Lindop

Hull Kingston Rovers: Dave Hall, Steve Hubbard, Mike Smith, Phil Hogan, Wally Youngman, Steve Hartley, Paul Harkin, Roy Holdstock, Raymond Price, David Watkinson, Phil Lowe, Len Casey, Mick Crane. Res – Ian Robinson, Graham Douglas. Coach – Roger Millward

New Zealand: Gary Kemble, Gary Prohm, John Whittaker, James Leuluai, Dane O'Hara, Nolan Tupaea, Shane Varley, Mark Broadhurst, Howie Tamati, Bruce Gall, Graeme West, Ray Baxendale, Barry Edkins. Res – Paul Te Ariki

Sunday 26 October

Leeds	5 – 25	New Zealand
Tries: David Smith; Goals: Kevin Dick (1)		Tries: Mark Graham (2), Tony Coll, James Leuluai, John Whittaker; Goals: Gordon Smith (5)

Headingley, Leeds
Attendance: 5,662
Referee: Ron Campbell

Leeds: Willie Oulton, Alan Smith, David Smith, Neil Hague, John Atkinson, John Holmes, Kevin Dick, Neil Lean, David Ward, Steve Pitchford, Graham Eccles, John Carroll, David Heron. Res – Gary Hetherington, Roy Dickinson. Coach – Robin Dewhurst

New Zealand: Michael O'Donnell, Kevin Fisher, John Whittaker, James Leuluai, Dane O'Hara, Fred Ah Kuoi, Gordon Smith, Mark Broadhurst, Alan Rushton, Kevin Tamati, Graeme West, Tony Coll, Mark Graham (c). Res – Rick Muru

Wednesday 29 October

Warrington	11 – 7	New Zealand
Tries: Edwin Hunter, Tommy Martyn; Goals: Steve Hesford (2); Field Goals: Anthony Waller (1)		Tries: Shane Varley; Goals: Barry Edkins (1); Gary Kemble (1)

Wilderspool Stadium, Warrington
Attendance: 5,680
Referee: Vince Moss

Warrington: Derek Finnegan, Richard Thackray, Ian Duane, John Bevan, Steve Hesford, Jimmy Fairhurst, Alan Gwilliam, Neil Courtney, Anthony Waller, Brian Case, Tommy Martyn, Ian Potter, Edwin Hunter. Res – Billy Benyon, Bob Eccles. Coach – Billy Benyon

New Zealand: Gary Kemble, Bernie Green, Nolan Tupaea, Bruce Dickison, Gary Prohm, Bill Kells, Shane Varley, Rick Muru, Howie Tamati, Bruce Gall, Paul Te Ariki, Ray Baxendale, Barry Edkins. Res – Dane O'Hara

=== Second Test ===
Sunday 2 November

Great Britain	8 – 12	New Zealand
Tries: Goals: George Fairbairn (4/5)		Tries: Michael O'Donnell; Dane O'Hara; Goals: Gordon Smith (3/4); Michael O'Donnell (0/2)

Odsal Stadium, Bradford
Attendance: 10,946
Referee: Fred Lindop (England)
Player of the Match: Mark Broadhurst

Great Britain	New Zealand

FB	1	George Fairbairn (c)
RW	2	Des Drummond
RC	3	John Joyner
LC	4	Mike Smith
LW	5	Chris Camilleri
SO	6	Ken Kelly
SH	7	Kevin Dick
PR	8	Roy Holdstock
HK	9	Keith Elwell
PR	10	Glyn Shaw
SR	11	Jeff Grayshon
SR	12	Len Casey
LF	13	Harry Pinner
Substitutions:
IC	14	Steve Evans
IC	15	Les Gorley
Coach:
(England) Johnny Whiteley

FB	1	Michael O'Donnell
RW	2	Gary Prohm
RC	3	James Leuluai
LC	4	John Whittaker
LW	5	Dane O'Hara
FE	6	Fred Ah Kuoi
HB	7	Gordon Smith
PR	8	Mark Broadhurst
HK	9	Alan Rushton
PR	10	Kevin Tamati
SR	11	Graeme West
SR	12	Tony Coll
LK	13	Mark Graham (c)
Substitutions:
IC	14	Ray Baxendale
IC	15	Kevin Fisher
Coach:
(New Zealand) Ces Mountford

Wednesday 5 November

Great Britain U/24	14 – 18	New Zealand
Tries: Steve Evans, Neil Holding; Goals: Mick Burke (4)		Tries: Dane O'Hara (2), Ray Baxendale, Graeme West; Goals: Gary Kemble (2); Barry Edkins (1)

Craven Cottage, London
Attendance: 2,397
Referee: Stan Wall

Great Britain U/24: Mick Burke, Richard Thackray, David Stephenson, Gary Hyde, Steve Fenton, Steve Evans (c), Neil Holding, Gary Van Bellen, Paul O'Neill, Brian Case, Kevin Ward, Vince Fox, Terry Flanagan. Res – Keith Bentley, Mike O'Neill. Coach – Johnny Whiteley

New Zealand: Michael O'Donnell, Gary Kemble, Gary Prohm, Dane O'Hara, Kevin Fisher, Fred Ah Kuoi, Shane Varley, Mark Broadhurst, Howie Tamati, Bruce Gall, Graeme West, Ray Baxendale, Barry Edkins. Res – Dane O'Hara

Sunday 9 November

Widnes	14 – 7	New Zealand
Tries: Keith Elwell, Mick George; Goals: Mick Burke (4)		Tries: Dane O'Hara; Goals: Gordon Smith (2)

Naughton Park, Widnes
Attendance: 6,416
Referee: Stan Wall

Widnes: Mick Burke, Stuart Wright, Mick George, Eddie Cunningham, Keith Bentley, Eric Hughes, Tony Myler, Brian Hogan, Keith Elwell, Glyn Shaw, Mike O'Neill, Eric Prescott, Mick Adams. Res – Wayne Rutene, Fred Whitfield. Coach – Doug Laughton

New Zealand: Michael O'Donnell, Kevin Fisher, John Whittaker, James Leuluai, Dane O'Hara, Fred Ah Kuoi, Gordon Smith, Mark Broadhurst, Alan Rushton, Kevin Tamati, Graeme West, Ray Baxendale, Tony Coll. Res – Shane Varley, Bruce Gall

Tuesday 11 November

Leigh	5 – 22	New Zealand
Tries: Keith Elwell, Mick George; Goals: Mick Burke (4)		Tries: Dane O'Hara; Goals: Gordon Smith (2)

Hilton Park, Leigh
Attendance: 3,166
Referee: Stan Wall

Leigh: Peter Alstead, David Bullough, David Dunn, Steve Donlan, Philip Fox, Alan Fairhurst, Ken Green, Anthony Cooke, Les Wall, Terry Bowman, Ian Hobson, Alan Rathbone, Tom Gittins. Res – Alan Keaveney, Ray Tabern. Coach – Alex Murphy

New Zealand: Gary Kemble, Bernie Green, Bruce Dickison, Nolan Tupaea, Gary Prohm, Bill Kells, Shane Varley, Rick Muru, Howie Tamati, Danny Campbell, Paul Te Ariki, Bruce Gall, Barry Edkins. Res – Kevin Fisher, Alan Rushton

=== Third Test ===
Saturday 15 November

Great Britain	10 – 2	New Zealand
Tries: Des Drummond (2); Goals: Mick Burke (2/3)		Tries: Goals: Gordon Smith (1/3); Barry Edkins (0/3)

Elland Road, Leeds
Attendance: 8,210
Referee: Billy Thompson (England)

Great Britain	New Zealand

FB	1	Mick Burke
RW	2	Des Drummond
RC	3	John Joyner
LC	4	Steve Evans
LW	5	John Atkinson
SO	6	John Woods
SH	7	Arnold Walker
PR	8	Trevor Skerrett
HK	9	Keith Elwell
PR	10	Len Casey (c)
SR	11	Mick Adams
SR	12	Peter Gorley
LF	13	Steve Norton
Substitutions:
IC	14
IC	15
Coach:
(England) Johnny Whiteley

FB	1	Michael O'Donnell
RW	2	Gary Prohm
RC	3	John Whittaker
LC	4	Bruce Dickison
LW	5	Dane O'Hara
FE	6	Fred Ah Kuoi
HB	7	Gordon Smith
PR	8	Mark Broadhurst
HK	9	Alan Rushton
PR	10	Kevin Tamati
SR	11	Graeme West
SR	12	Barry Edkins
LK	13	Mark Graham (c)
Substitutions:
IC	14	Howie Tamati
IC	15	Ray Baxendale
Coach:
(New Zealand) Ces Mountford

== France ==
=== First Test ===
Sunday 23 November

France	6 – 5	New Zealand
Tries: Jean-Marc Bourret (2); Goals:		Tries: Gary Prohm; Goals: Michael O'Donnell (1)

Stade Gilbert Brutus, Perpignan
Attendance: 6,000
Referee: Guy Cattaneo (France)

France	New Zealand

FB	1	Marcel Pillon
RW	2	Jean-Pierre Siré
RC	3	Jean-Marc Bourret
LC	4	Christian Laumond
LW	5	Hugues Ratier
SO	6	Hervé Guiraud
SH	7	Ivan Grésèque
PR	8	Henri Daniel
HK	9	André Malacamp
PR	10	Charles Zalduendo
SR	11	Jean-Jacques Vila
SR	12	Didier Hermet (c)
LK	13	Joël Roosebrouck
Substitutions:
IC	14	Guy Delaunay
IC	15	Guy Garcia
Coach:
(France) Roger Garrigue

FB	1	Gary Kemble
RW	2	Gary Prohm
RC	3	John Whittaker
LC	4	Michael O'Donnell
LW	5	Dane O'Hara
FE	6	Fred Ah Kuoi
HB	7	Gordon Smith
PR	8	Mark Broadhurst
HK	9	Alan Rushton
PR	10	Kevin Tamati
SR	11	Graeme West
SR	12	Ray Baxendale
LK	13	Mark Graham (c)
Substitutions:
IC	14	Howie Tamati
IC	15	Bruce Dickison
Coach:
(New Zealand) Ces Mountford

=== Second Test ===
Sunday 7 December

France	3 – 11	New Zealand
Tries: Jean-Marc Bourret Goals:		Tries: Dane O'Hara; Gary Prohm; Gordon Smith; Goals: Gordon Smith (1)

Stadium Municipal, Toulouse
Attendance: 3,000
Referee: Pierre Bonnefont (France)

France	New Zealand

FB	1	Marcel Pillon
RW	2	Jean-Pierre Siré
RC	3	Jean-Marc Bourret
LC	4	Hugues Ratier
LW	5	Bernard Imbert
SO	6	Hervé Guiraud
SH	7	Ivan Grésèque
PR	8	Guy Hermet
HK	9	André Malacamp
PR	10	Dominique Verdières
SR	11	Jean-Jacques Vila
SR	12	Jean-Pierre Tremouille
LK	13	Joël Roosebrouck (c)
Substitutions:
IC	14	Charles Zalduendo
IC	15
Coach: (France) Roger Garrigue

FB	1	Michael O'Donnell
RW	2	Gary Prohm
RC	3	John Whittaker
LC	4	James Leuluai
LW	5	Dane O'Hara
FE	6	Fred Ah Kuoi
HB	7	Gordon Smith
PR	8	Mark Broadhurst
HK	9	Howie Tamati
PR	10	Kevin Tamati
SR	11	Graeme West
SR	12	Tony Coll
LK	13	Mark Graham (c)
Substitutions:
IC	14	Alan Rushton
IC	15	Bruce Dickison
Coach:
(New Zealand) Ces Mountford

== Statistics ==
Leading try scorer

- 6 by Dane O'Hara

Leading point scorer

- 33 by Gordon Smith (1 try, 15 goals)

Largest Test attendance

- 10,946 – Second test vs Great Britain at Odsal Stadium

Largest club game attendance

- 15,945 – Hull F.C. vs New Zealand at Boothferry Park

== Aftermath ==
Following the tour, Fred Ah Kuoi (North Sydney Bears), James Leuluai, Dane O'Hara and Gary Kemble (Hull F.C.) and Mark Broadhurst (Manly-Warringah) subsequently secured professional contracts.
