= 1977 New Zealand rugby league season =

Seasons
- ← 1976 1978 →

The 1977 New Zealand rugby league season was the 70th season of rugby league that had been played in New Zealand.

== International competitions ==
New Zealand co-hosted the World Cup with Australia. The Kiwis lost to Great Britain, France and Australia. Matches were played at the Addington Showgrounds and Carlaw Park. New Zealand were coached by Ron Ackland and consisted of captain Tony Coll (c), Fred Ah Kuoi, Warren Collicoat, Ray Baxendale, Olsen Filipaina, Kevin Fisher, Mark Graham, Whare Henry, Whetu Henry, Chris Jordan, Michael O'Donnell, Dane O'Hara, Lyndsay Proctor, Alan Rushton, John Smith, Kurt and Dane Sorensen, John Whittaker and Dennis Williams. Dane Sorensen became the first New Zealander to be selected for the New Zealand national rugby league team while based overseas, when he was picked while playing for the Cronulla-Sutherland Sharks.

Coached by Bill Sorensen, Auckland famously completed a "grand slam" when they defeated Australia, England and France in the space of 21 days in June. Auckland defeated Australia 19–15 on 1 June, Great Britain 14–10 on 14 June and France 17–0 on 21 June all at Carlaw Park. Auckland were captained by Dennis Williams and included Gary Kemble, Warren Winter, Olsen Filipaina, Chris Jordan, Dave Sorensen, John Smith, John Wilson, Glenn Taylor, Lyndsay Proctor, Kurt Sorensen, Alan McCarthy, Mark Graham, Dave Lepper, Dane O'Hara, Fred Ah Kuoi, Stan Napa, Luther Toloa and Mark Lowe.

New Zealand also hosted the Pacific Cup. The New Zealand Māori side defended their title, beating Western Australia 35–12 in the final at Carlaw Park. Coached by Tom Newton, the New Zealand Māori squad included Dick Uluave, James Leuluai, Dennis Key, Rick Muru, John Wilson, Josh Liavaa and Ian Bell. The Pacific Cup was not a financial success and was not held again until 1986.

The Auckland under 21 side toured New South Wales.

John Smith won the New Zealand Rugby League's player of the year award.

== National competitions ==
=== Rugby League Cup ===
Taranaki held the Rugby League Cup at the end of the season.

=== Inter-district competition ===
Auckland won the Rothmans trophy, defeating Wellington 36–22 at Carlaw Park in the final.

John Smith, Warren Winter, Dennis Williams, Mark Graham, Joe Karam and Dane O'Hara played for Auckland, who were coached by Bill Sorensen.

== Australasian competition ==
Auckland were eliminated in Round one of the Amco Cup when they lost 2–23 to a Northern Division side. The match was held at the same time as the Kiwis trial, meaning Auckland was without fourteen of its top players.

Canterbury also lost 12–20 to Brisbane Easts in Round one.

== Club competitions ==
=== Auckland ===
Otahuhu dominated, winning the Auckland Rugby League's Fox Memorial Trophy, Rukutai Shield, Roope Rooster, Stormont Shield and the Kiwi Shield. They defeated the Richmond Bulldogs 11–3 in the Fox Memorial grand final. Manukau won the Sharman Cup and Glenfield won the Norton Cup.

John Wilson (Northcote) won the Lipscombe Cup, Dennis Williams (Te Atatu) won the Rothville Trophy, Lyndsay Proctor(Ellerslie) and Olsen Filipaina (Mangere East) won the Bert Humphries Memorial, Nick Wright (Otahuhu) won the Tetley Trophy, Joe Karam (Glenora) won the Painter Rosebowl Trophy and Graham Lowe (Otahuhu) won the Hyland Memorial Cup.

The East Coast Bays club was founded in 1977.

Otahuhu were coached by Graham Lowe while Joe Karam played for Glenora.

=== Wellington ===
St George won the Wellington Rugby League's Appleton Shield.

Kevin Tamati played for Upper Hutt.

=== Canterbury ===
Papanui won the Canterbury Rugby League's Pat Smith Challenge Trophy.

Wigram and Woodbourne met in the first rugby league match between Royal New Zealand Air Force bases.

The Parklands club joined the Rugby League in 1977.

Mocky Brereton was the player-coach of Marist-Western Suburbs.

=== Other Competitions ===
The Waitara Bears won the Taranaki Rugby League championship. Marist were the runners up
