= 1978 New Zealand rugby league season =

Seasons
- ← 1977 1979 →

The 1978 New Zealand rugby league season was the 71st season of rugby league that had been played in New Zealand.

== International competitions ==
New Zealand toured Australia and Papua New Guinea. The Kiwis lost 0–3 to Australia but defeated Papua New Guinea in the first Test match between the two countries. Ron Ackland coached the Kiwis who were selected by Ackland, Bill Sorensen and Harry Walker and included; Fred Ah Kuoi, Ray Baxendale, Ian Bell, Tony Coll, Murray Eade, Olsen Filipaina, Mark Graham, Whetu Henry, Chris Jordan, Dane O'Hara, Lyndsay Proctor, Gary Prohm, Alan Rushton, John Smith, captain Ken Stirling, Glenn Taylor, Shane Varley, Dennis Williams, Nick Wright, Steve McGregor and Warren Winter. Barry Edkins was injured on debut.

The New South Wales Rugby League's St. George Dragons defeated Auckland 27–18 in September. A week later the Auckland Rugby League's Otahuhu Leopards defeated the Cronulla-Sutherland Sharks 8–2.

Olsen Filipaina won the New Zealand Rugby League's player of the year award.

== National competitions ==
=== Rugby League Cup ===
Taranaki again held the Rugby League Cup at the end of the season.

=== Inter-zone competition ===
Northern Zone defeated Southern Zone 11–5.

=== Inter-district competition ===
Auckland retained the Rothmans trophy when they defeated Canterbury 20–13 at Carlaw Park. Canterbury had defeated the West Coast 39–8 in Greymouth.

Olsen Filipaina, Fred Ah Kuoi, Dennis Williams, Gray Prohm and Nick Wright played for Auckland, who were coached by Don Hammond. Mocky Brereton played for Canterbury.

==== South Island Second Division ====
Canterbury B won the South Island second division title, defeating the West Coast B, Marlborough-Tasman Bays and Otago-Southland.

== Australasian competition ==
Auckland lost in the quarter-finals Amco Cup 6–22 to the Cronulla Sharks. They had defeated Riverina to qualify for the quarter finals. Wellington lost 5–63 to Illawarra in Wollongong in Round one.

== Club competitions ==
=== Auckland ===
Otahuhu won the Auckland Rugby League's Fox Memorial Trophy, Rukutai Shield, Stormont Shield and Kiwi Shield. They defeated the Mangere East Hawks 18–4 in the Fox Memorial final. Glenora won the Roope Rooster, Te Atatu won the Sharman Cup and Pt Chevalier won the Norton Cup.

Gene Swann (Marist) won the Lipscombe Cup, Olsen Filipaina (Mangere East) won the Rothville Trophy, Owen Wright (Otahuhu)and Warwick Freeman (Glenora) won the Bert Humphries Memorial, Brian Campbell (Richmond) won the Tetley Trophy, Phil Dryland (Richmond) won the Painter Rosebowl Trophy and Graham Lowe (Otahuhu) won the Hyland Memorial Cup.

Steve McGregor played for the North Shore and Ken Stirling played for Ellerslie. Otahuhu were coached by Graham Lowe and included John Wright, Owen Wright, captain Mark Graham, Nick Wright and Glenn Taylor. Eastern United, a combined senior team from the Howick and Pakuranga, were coached by Murray Eade.

=== Wellington ===
Petone won the Wellington Rugby League's Appleton Shield.

Kevin Tamati played for Upper Hutt.

=== Canterbury ===
Papanui won the Canterbury Rugby League's Pat Smith Challenge Trophy.

The "United" club joined in 1978. It drew many members from the Paparua Prison.

=== Other Competitions ===
The Waitara Bears won the Taranaki Rugby League championship. Marist were the runners up
