= 1976 New Zealand rugby league season =

Seasons
- ← 1975 1977 →

The 1976 New Zealand rugby league season was the 69th season of rugby league that had been played in New Zealand. This was the first season played under the current rule of each team being limited to six tackles per possession.

== International competitions ==
A New Zealand XIII defeated the touring Sydney Metropolitan side 18–5 at Carlaw Park. From the team, only Bill Sorensen junior and Terry Gillman never wore the Kiwi jersey. The New Zealand selectors were Ron Ackland (coach), Morrie Church and George Menzies.

Sydney opened their tour with a 41–3 win over Waikato, who included Rick Muru and Paul Ravlich, before heading north to face New Zealand XIII. They then defeated North Island 54–8. North Island was without players from Waikato, Auckland and New Zealand XIII. The North Island included Joe Karam, Nolan Tupaea, Bruce Gall and Graeme West.

The South Island upset Sydney Metropolitan 18–17 with Bruce Dickison (two tries) and Michael O'Donnell (six goals) scoring all of the points. The South Island also included Eddie Kerrigan, David Field, John Griffin, Mark Broadhurst, captain Tony Coll and Mocky Brereton.

Auckland ended the tour with a 17–7 defeat of Sydney Metropolitan. Auckland also defeated St Helens R.F.C. during the season but lost to the New South Wales Rugby League's Eastern Suburbs Roosters. Auckland included Joe Karam, Fred Ah Kuoi, captain Dennis Williams, Bill Sorensen, John Smith, Shane Dowsett, Lyndsay Proctor, Dane Sorensen, Josh Liavaa, Kurt Sorensen and Dave Sorensen.

Tony Coll won the New Zealand Rugby League's player of the year award.

== National competitions ==
=== Rugby League Cup ===
Waikato again held the Rugby League Cup at the end of the season.

During the season the New Zealand Rugby League board changed the rules to allow Waikato to accept challenges from Minor Leagues. Previously only the Major Leagues had been able to challenge for the trophy.

=== Inter-district competition ===
Auckland won the Rothmans trophy, defeating Canterbury 29–22 in the final at the Addington Showgrounds. Auckland had earlier defeated Midlands-Bay of Plenty 51–26, Waikato 34-18 and Wellington 36–23.

Auckland were coached by Bill Sorensen and included Fred Ah Kuoi, John Smith, Chris Jordan, Dennis Williams, Joe Karam and Kurt Sorensen. Warren Collicoat and John O'Sullivan played for Wellington. Jim Fisher coached Canterbury who included Bob Jarvis and Murray Wright. Tony Coll played for the West Coast.

=== North Island club competition ===
The second DB Draught North Island club competition was held. Qualifying was on 26 September and featured clubs from eight regions; Northland, Bay of Plenty, Waikato, Hamilton, Midlands, Taranaki, Hawkes' Bay and Manawatu. In Huntly, Taniwharau (Waikato) defeated the Portland Parrots (Northland) 38-10 while the Ngongotaha Chiefs (Bay of Plenty) defeated Frankton Albions (Hamilton) 26–19. The Waitara Bears (Taranaki) and Tokoroa (Midlands) won qualifying matches against teams from Manawatu and Hawkes' Bay on the same day. Their matches were held in Manawatu.

On 2 October at Matarawa Park in Tokoroa, Taniwharau defeated Ngongotahā 41-10 and Tokoroa defeated Waitara 19–14. The final was held at Davies Park and saw Taniwharau defeat Tokora 27–12. Taniwharau included Rick Muru.

Quarter-finals
26 September, Huntly/Manawatu
Taniwharau (Waikato)	38
Portland Parrots (Northland)	10
26 September, Huntly/Manawatu
Ngongotaha Chiefs (Bay of Plenty)	26
Frankton Albions (Hamilton)	19
26 September, Huntly/Manawatu
Waitara Bears (Taranaki)
Unknown
26 September, Huntly/Manawatu
Tokoroa (Midlands)
Unknown

Semi-finals
2 October, Mataraw Park, Tokoroa
Taniwharau	41
Ngongotaha	10
2 October, Mataraw Park, Tokoroa
Waitara	14
Tokoroa	19

Final
Davies Park, Huntly
Taniwharau	27
Tokoroa	12

== Australasian competition ==
Auckland were eliminated in Round two of the Amco Cup when they lost 8–21 to the Balmain Tigers. Auckland had defeated Redcliffe 30–5 in Round one. Canterbury lost 7–38 to Brisbane Easts in Round one.

== Club competitions ==
=== Auckland ===
Mount Wellington won the Auckland Rugby League's Fox Memorial Trophy and Rukutai Shield. They defeated Glenora 20–12 in the Fox final. Richmond won the Roope Rooster and Stormont Shield while Glenora won the Kiwi Shield, Te Atatu won the Sharman Cup and City Newton won the Norton Cup.

Dane Sorensen played for Mount Wellington, in his last season in New Zealand before signing with the Cronulla-Sutherland Sharks. He won the Lipscombe Cup. His brother Kurt, who also played for Mount Wellington, won the Rothville Trophy.

Murray Netzler (Ellerslie) and Gary Kemble (Ellerslie) won the Bert Humphries Memorial while Gus Fepuleai (Richmond) won the Tetley Trophy, Joe Karam (Glenora) won the Painter Rosebowl Trophy and Ron Ackland (Mt Wellington) won the Hyland Memorial Cup.

Former All Black Joe Karam scored 160 points for the Glenora Bears during the season. Richmond included Fred Ah Kuoi and Shane Varley.

=== Wellington ===
Randwick won the Wellington Rugby League's Appleton Shield.

Warren Collicoat and John O'Sullivan both transferred to Wellington clubs from Auckland. Kevin Tamati played for Upper Hutt.

=== Canterbury ===
Papanui won the Canterbury Rugby League's Pat Smith Challenge Trophy.

Hornby signed Bob Jarvis, Wayne Robertson and Murray Wright from Auckland, for which the New Zealand Rugby League imposed a $1000 transfer fee per player. The Eastern Suburbs included Graeme Cooksley. Mark Broadhurst played for Papanui.

=== Other Competitions ===
The Waitara Bears won the Taranaki Rugby League championship. Marist were the runners up

The Canterbury Rugby League assisted expansion in the South Island with two clubs being founded in Marlborough, Blenheim City and Woodbourne, the Ashley (now Rangiora) club being founded and the Wai-iti club being founded in Timaru. Twizel prepared for entry in the 1977 competition and the Southland Rugby League was re-established.
