= Uve =

Uve or UVE may refer to

- An alternative spelling of the German masculine given name Uwe
- Ouvéa Airport in Ouvéa, New Caledonia (call sign UVE)
- Uve Sabumei, Papua New Guinean rugby coach
- Uncorrelated volume element, a term used in the theory of composite materials
- Unión Velocipédica Española, former name of the Royal Spanish Cycling Federation
