= Prohm =

Prohm is a surname. Notable people with the surname include:

- Gary Prohm (born 1956), New Zealand rugby league footballer and coach
- Steve Prohm (born 1974), American basketball coach
