= Keith Bentley =

GB international rugby league footballer

Personal information
- Full name: Keith Bentley
- Born: 1 October 1959 (age 66)

Playing information
- Position: Wing, Centre
Club
Years	Team	Pld	T	G	FG	P
1976–82	Widnes	125	64	0	0	192
1982–83	Barrow	17	4	0	0	12
1983–91	Salford	77	23	2	1	97
1986–87	→ Leigh (loan)	4	1	0	0	4
	Total	223	92	2	1	305
Representative
Years	Team	Pld	T	G	FG	P
1980	Great Britain U24	1	0	0	0	0
1980–81	Lancashire	4	1	0	0	3
1980	Great Britain	1	0	0	0	0

Keith Bentley (born 1 October 1959) is a former professional rugby league footballer who played in the 1970s, 1980s and 1990s. He played at representative level for Great Britain, and at club level for Widnes, Barrow, Salford and Leigh, as a wing or centre.

== Playing career ==
=== Widnes ===
Keith Bentley played in Widnes' 18–9 victory over Hull Kingston Rovers in the 1981 Challenge Cup Final during the 1980–81 season at Wembley Stadium, London on Saturday 2 May 1981.

Bentley played left wing, and scored a try in Widnes' 3–8 defeat by Leigh in the 1981 Lancashire Cup Final during the 1981–82 season at Central Park, Wigan on Saturday 26 September 1981.

In April 1982, Bentley was transferred to Barrow in exchange for Chris Camilleri.

=== Salford ===
Bentley was signed by Salford in September 1983. He had a spell on loan at Leigh during the 1986–87 season.

Bentley played right-centre, and scored a try in Salford's 17–22 defeat by Wigan in the 1988 Lancashire Cup Final during the 1988–89 season at Knowsley Road, St. Helens on Sunday 23 October 1988.

=== Representative honours ===
Bentley won a cap for Great Britain while at Widnes in 1980 against New Zealand.

Bentley also represented Lancashire, playing four times for the team between 1980 and 1981.
