= Danny Campbell (rugby league) =

New Zealand rugby league footballer (1956–2021)

Personal information
- Full name: Daniel William Campbell
- Born: 20 April 1956 New Zealand
- Died: 22 August 2021 (aged 65) Mitimiti, New Zealand

Playing information
- Position: Prop, Second-row
Club
Years	Team	Pld	T	G	FG	P
	Far North Falcons
1979–86	Wigan	145	12	0	0	38
1986	Leigh	10	1	0	0	4
1986–89	Runcorn Highfield	62	1	0	0	4
	Total	217	14	0	0	46
Representative
Years	Team	Pld	T	G	FG	P
	Northland
1980	New Zealand	1	0	0	0	0

Daniel William Campbell (20 April 1956 – 22 August 2021) was a New Zealand rugby league footballer who played professionally for Wigan, Leigh and Runcorn Highfield.

== Playing career ==
Campbell played for the Far North Falcons and represented Northland.

Danny Campbell moved to England in 1979, joining Wigan. Danny Campbell played at prop in Wigan's 15–4 victory over Leeds in the 1982–83 John Player Trophy Final during the 1982–83 season at Elland Road, Leeds on Saturday 22 January 1983. Danny Campbell was a substitute in Wigan's 28–24 victory over Hull F.C. in the 1985 Challenge Cup Final during the 1984–85 season at Wembley Stadium, London on Saturday 4 May 1985. He played in a total of 145 matches for Wigan between 1979 and 1986.

He was part of the New Zealand squad during their 1980 tour of Great Britain and France, but did not appear in any of the Test matches.

On 22 August 2021, Campbell died at his home in Mitimiti, New Zealand. He left a wife and four children.
