= Bernie Green =

New Zealand international rugby league footballer

Bernie Green (Hurgi)
Personal information
- Full name: Bernard John Green
- Born: 15 April 1959 Rapahoe, Greymouth, New Zealand
- Died: 8 September 2006 (aged 47) Blackball, New Zealand

Playing information
- Height: 185 cm (6 ft 1 in)
- Position: Centre
Club
Years	Team	Pld	T	G	FG	P
1964–89	Runanga
Representative
Years	Team	Pld	T	G	FG	P
1977–89	West Coast
1978–84	South Island	21
1980	New Zealand	9	5	0	0	0

Bernard John Green (15 April 1959 – 8 September 2006) was a New Zealand rugby league player who represented New Zealand.

== Playing career ==
Green played in the West Coast Rugby League competition and represented the West Coast.

In 1980 he played for the South Island in the New Zealand Rugby League's inter-district competition. He was then selected for the New Zealand squad that was touring Great Britain and France, becoming Kiwi number 556. He played in 9 games and scored 5 tries on tour, but did not play in any of the test matches.

1980 Green played for South Island against the touring Australian team filled with talent. Green marked Chris Close with South Island winning the game giving Australia their only loss for the tour.

Green was later selected for the 1980 kiwi tour of GB and France where he played 8 games scoring 5 tries. Green picked up an illness on tour preventing him from playing further games. In France, the kiwis last tour game, Green was named player of the day.

In 1981 Green played for the South Island against the touring French side.

In 1986 Green was part of the Runanga side that won the West Coast premiership. In 1987 Runanga again won the West Coast title, and Green was part of the West Coast B side that won the South Island second division. Green was Runanga's player-coach in 1989 and again played for the West Coast.

In 1997, Green coached the Runanga team to the post competition super-six title. The game was played against Cobden in Cobden and a young Runanga side claimed the victory. This would be Runangas last title until 2006.

in 2001 at 42, Green made a special appearance playing his last senior competitive game for Runanga against Suburbs. Green played alongside his four sons and was cheered on by his wife Rose and daughter in the stands. Suburbs were the previous years grand final winners and clear favourites, however tries to two of Greens sons who also kicked goals created a memorial win for Green. Due to two of Greens sons playing in Australia and not being registered and Green himself not being registered, Suburbs complained to the WCRL and were awarded the two points. Green commented, the win was the icing on the cake, considering the games he played during his playing days, Green said this was his biggest career highlight playing alongside his four boys.

Two of Greens sons played for New Zealand junior age group teams.

== Later years ==
A miner, Green died on 8 September 2006 during a rockfall at the Roa mine.
