= Paul Te Ariki =

New Zealand international rugby league footballer

Personal information
- Full name: Paul William Te Ariki
- Born: 1956 (age 68–69); Gisborne, New Zealand

Playing information
- Position: Prop
Representative
| Years | Team | Pld | T | G | FG | P |
|---|---|---|---|---|---|---|
| | Wellington |
| 1980 | New Zealand | 1 | 0 | 0 | 0 | 0 |

Paul William Te Ariki is a New Zealand former professional rugby league footballer who played in the 1980s. He played at representative level for New Zealand, and Wellington, as a prop.

== Playing career ==
=== Representative career ===
Te Ariki represented New Zealand in 1980 against Australia, and on the tour of Great Britain and France.
