= Chris Camilleri =

GB & Wales international rugby league footballer

Personal information
- Born: 4 March 1954 (age 72)

Playing information

Rugby union
Club
Years	Team	Pld	T	G	FG	P
1974–79	Cardiff RFC	124	73	0	0	292

Rugby league
- Position: Wing
Club
Years	Team	Pld	T	G	FG	P
1979–81	Barrow	44	33	0	0	99
1981–82	Fulham RLFC	6	0	0	0	0
1982–83	Widnes	13	7	0	0	21
1983–85	Cardiff City (Bridgend) Blue Dragons	40	10	0	0	40
	Total	103	50	0	0	160
Representative
Years	Team	Pld	T	G	FG	P
1980	Cumbria	1	0	0	0	0
1980–84	Wales	3	0	0	0	0
1980	Great Britain	2	1	0	0	4

Chris Camilleri (born 4 March 1954) is a Welsh former rugby union and professional rugby league footballer who played in the 1970s and 1980s. He played rugby union (RU) at club level initially for St. Peter's RFC and then Cardiff RFC, and rugby league (RL) at representative level for Great Britain, Wales and Cumbria, and at club level for Barrow, Fulham RLFC, Widnes and Cardiff City (Bridgend) Blue Dragons, as a wing.

== International honours ==
Chris Camilleri won caps for Wales (RL) while at Barrow in 1980 against France, while at Widnes in 1982 against Australia, and while at Cardiff City (Bridgend) Blue Dragons in 1984 against England, and won caps for Great Britain (RL) while at Barrow in 1980 against New Zealand (2 matches).

== County honours ==
Chris Camilleri represented Cumbria.
