= Rick Muru =

New Zealand international rugby league player (died 2020)

Personal information
- Full name: Wiremu Hira Muru
- Born: 4 September 1950 Huntly, New Zealand
- Died: 15 May 2020 (aged 69) Huntly, New Zealand

Playing information
- Weight: 115 kg (18 st 2 lb)
- Position: Prop
Club
Years	Team	Pld	T	G	FG	P
	Taniwharau
Representative
Years	Team	Pld	T	G	FG	P
	Waikato
1975–77	New Zealand Māori
1980–81	New Zealand	0	0	0	0	0

Wiremu Hira Muru (4 September 1950 – 15 May 2020), commonly known as Rick Muru, was a New Zealand rugby league footballer who represented New Zealand.

== Playing career ==
From Huntly, Muru played for the Taniwharau Rugby League Club in the Waikato Rugby League competition and represented Waikato. He also played for New Zealand Māori, including at the 1975 and 1977 Pacific Cups.

In 1980 Muru was selected to play for the New Zealand national rugby league team on their tour of Great Britain and France. He played in 5 games, scoring one try, but did not play in any of the test matches.

== Later years ==
Muru was a member of the Tainui tribe and was a nephew of Robert Mahuta. Muru served as the chairman of the Waahi Marae Committee and was a board member of the Auckland Warriors when Tainui controlled the club.

In 2015, he was named at prop in Taniwharau's team of their first 70 years.

Muru died at Waahi Pā, Huntly, on 15 May 2020, aged 69.
