= Uve Sabumei =

PNG international rugby league coach

Uve Sambumei
Personal information
- Born: Papua New Guinea

Coaching information
Representative
Years	Team	Gms	W	D	L	W%
1979–83	Papua New Guinea	5	0	1	4	0

Uve Sabumei was the first Papua New Guinean national to coach the PNG Kumuls rugby league team.
