= Nolan Tupaea =

New Zealand international rugby league footballer

Personal information
- Full name: Nolan John Kotahitanga o te Hau Tupaea
- Born: 26 December 1952 (age 73)

Playing information
- Position: Stand-off
Club
Years	Team	Pld	T	G	FG	P
1970–79	St. George (WRL)
1973–74	Wigan	11	0	0	0	0
1980–85	Petone (WRL)
	Total	11	0	0	0	0
Representative
Years	Team	Pld	T	G	FG	P
1971–85	Wellington	64
1976	North Island
1979–82	Central Districts
1980	New Zealand	0	0	0	0	0
1983	New Zealand Māori

Nolan John Kotahitanga o te Hau Tupaea is a New Zealand former professional rugby league footballer who played in the 1980s. He played at representative level for New Zealand, and Wellington, as a stand-off.

== Playing career ==
Tupaea played for the St. George club and the Petone Panthers in the Wellington Rugby League competition. Tupaea played for St. George between 1970 and 1979, being part of a premiership winning side in 1977. He spent 1973-74 season playing for Wigan, although he did not play in a first grade match. In 1979 he moved to Petone, winning premierships in 1980, 1981 and 1982. He was also part of their 1982 victory in the National Club Cup.

== Representative career ==
Tupaea represented Wellington, playing 64 matches between 1971 and 1985. He was selected for the Kiwi Colts in 1973 for a match against Queensland. In 1976 he represented the North Island against the touring Sydney Metropolitan side.

Tupaea played for the Central Districts side in their first five years of the New Zealand Rugby League's district competition. The side won the competition in 1979, 1980 and 1982.

He represented the New Zealand national rugby league team in 1980 on their tour of Great Britain and France. He didn't play a test match, but he did play in 11 games for the Kiwis, scoring three tries. In 1983 he toured Britain again, this time with the New Zealand Māori side.

== Legacy ==
Tupaea was named as the Stand-off in the Petone Panthers' Team of the Century in 2012.
