= Bruce Dickison =

New Zealand rugby league footballer and coach (born 1953)

Personal information
- Full name: Bruce Ian Dickison
- Born: 30 August 1953 (age 72) New Zealand

Playing information
- Position: Centre
Club
Years	Team	Pld	T	G	FG	P
19??–76	Eastern Suburbs (CRL)
1977–80	Sydenham (CRL)
1983	Papanui (CRL)
	Total	0	0	0	0	0
Representative
Years	Team	Pld	T	G	FG	P
1973–80	Canterbury	21
1973	Southern Zone
1975–80	New Zealand	8	0	0	0	0
1974–80	South Island

Coaching information
Club
Years	Team	Gms	W	D	L	W%
1985	Eastern Suburbs (CRL)

Bruce Dickison is a New Zealand former rugby league footballer who represented New Zealand in the 1975 World Cup.

== Playing career ==
Dickison played for the Eastern Suburbs in the Canterbury Rugby League competition. He represented New Zealand at the under 17 and under 19 levels before first being selected for the New Zealand national rugby league team in 1975 as part of the World Cup. Dickison scored three tries in his debut against Southwest France. Dickison again played for the Kiwis in 1980, finishing his career with 19 matches for New Zealand, including six Test matches. In his career with New Zealand, Bruce Dickison scored eight tries.

Dickison was also a Canterbury representative, playing 21 times for Canterbury between 1973 and 1980. He also played for Southern Zone against Northern Zone and represented South Island in such competitions as a 1976 match against Sydney Metropolitan and another in 1980 against Australia.

In 1973 Dickison shared the A.G.Bailey Challenge Cup as the leading try-scorer in the Canterbury Rugby League. Dickison moved to the Sydenham club between 1977 and 1980 before finishing his career with Papanui in 1983. He finished his career with 125 tries in the Canterbury Rugby League competition.

== Coaching career ==
Dickison coached Eastern Suburbs in 1985.
