= Bruce Gall =

New Zealand international rugby league footballer

Personal information
- Full name: Bruce Percy Gall
- Born: 1956 (age 68–69); New Zealand

Playing information
- Position: Second-row
Club
| Years | Team | Pld | T | G | FG | P |
|---|---|---|---|---|---|---|
| | Unknown (TRL) |
| 1983–84 | Balmain Tigers | 11 | 1 | 0 | 0 | 4 |
| | Total | 11 | 1 | 0 | 0 | 4 |
Representative
| Years | Team | Pld | T | G | FG | P |
| | Taranaki |
| 1976 | North Island |
| 1979 | Central Districts |
| 1980–82 | New Zealand | 3 | 1 | 0 | 0 | 3 |

Bruce Gall is a New Zealand rugby league player who represented New Zealand.

== Playing career ==
Gall played in the Taranaki Rugby League and represented Taranaki. In 1976 Gall played for the North Island against the touring Sydney Metropolitan side.

In 1979 he played for the Central Districts side that won the Inter-Districts competition.

He was selected for the New Zealand national rugby league team on the 1980 tour of Great Britain and France. Gall did not play in a test match but did play in 8 games for the Kiwis, scoring 3 tries. In 1982 Gall played in three test matches for New Zealand against Australia and Papua New Guinea, scoring one try.

Gall moved to Sydney in 1983, joining the Balmain Tigers in the NSWRL Premiership. He played in eleven matches over two seasons, scoring one try.

== Legacy ==
In 2008 he was named in the Taranaki Rugby League Team of the Century.
