= Ray Baxendale =

New Zealand international rugby league player

Personal information
- Full name: Raymond Frederick Baxendale
- Born: 23 February 1955 (age 71) New Zealand

Playing information
- Position: Prop, Second-row, Lock
Club
Years	Team	Pld	T	G	FG	P
19??–80	Runanga
1981	Marist-Western Suburbs
1981–82	Wakefield Trinity	14	1	0	0	3
	Total	14	1	0	0	3
Representative
Years	Team	Pld	T	G	FG	P
19??–80	West Coast
1975–81	New Zealand	17	0	0	0	0
19??–81	South Island
1981	Canterbury

Ray Baxendale is a New Zealand former rugby league footballer who represented New Zealand in the 1975 and 1977 World Cups.

== Playing career ==
Baxendale began his career playing for Runanga. A Junior Kiwi, Baxendale first made the New Zealand national rugby league team in 1975 at the World Cup and went on to play in 39 matches for New Zealand, including in 17 Test matches. Baxendale also represented the West Coast and the South Island.

In 1981 Baxendale joined Marist-Western Suburbs in the Canterbury Rugby League competition and represented Canterbury, captained the South Island against France and again played for New Zealand. He played for Wakefield Trinity in the 1981–82 season.
