= Barry Edkins =

New Zealand international rugby league footballer

Personal information
- Full name: Barry Rex Edkins
- Born: 12 October 1956 (age 70) Christchurch, New Zealand

Playing information
- Position: Loose forward, Second-row
Club
Years	Team	Pld	T	G	FG	P
	Eastern Suburbs (CRL)
	Hornby
	Randwick
	Total	0	0	0	0	0
Representative
Years	Team	Pld	T	G	FG	P
1975–??	Canterbury	52
1977–85	South Island	8	0	16	0	32
1979–80	New Zealand	4	0	0	0	0

Barry Rex Edkins (born 12 October 1956) is a New Zealand former professional rugby league footballer who played as a loose forward or second-row. He made four Test appearances for New Zealand between 1979 and 1980.

== Playing career ==
At club level, Edkins started his career with Eastern Suburbs in the Canterbury Rugby League (CRL) before transferring to Hornby at the start of the 1982 season. His usual position throughout his career was at loose forward, but he also occasionally played in the second-row.

Edkins played in 10 CRL grand finals during his career, five with Eastern Suburbs (1975, 1977 and 1979–81), and five consecutive finals with Hornby between 1982 and 1986.

Edkins also briefly played for Randwick in the Wellington Rugby League competition before returning back to Christchurch.

Edkins debuted for Canterbury in 1975, and went on to represent the team 52 times, one appearance short of the record held by Mocky Brereton.

Edkins was selected in the New Zealand squad for their 1978 tour of Australia. He impressed in his first appearance for the team against Riverina, but took no further part in the tour after suffering a broken jaw. He made his Test debut the following year against Great Britain in the third Test of the 1979 Lions tour. He was also selected for the 1980 Kiwis tour of Great Britain and France.
