= John Whittaker (rugby league) =

New Zealand & Cook Islands international rugby league footballer (1950–2020)

Personal information
- Full name: John Albert Whittaker
- Born: 28 March 1950
- Died: 29 September 2020 (aged 70)

Playing information
- Position: Fullback, Wing, Centre
Club
Years	Team	Pld	T	G	FG	P
	Randwick Kingfishers
Representative
Years	Team	Pld	T	G	FG	P
	Wellington	73
1970–82	New Zealand	26	8	0	0	24
	Central Districts	9
1986	Cook Islands

John Albert Whittaker (28 March 1950 – 29 September 2020) was a New Zealand rugby league footballer who played in the 1970s and 1980s at international level for the New Zealand national rugby league team and the Cook Islands.

== Playing career ==
From the Randwick club, Whittaker also played for Wellington a record 73 times. Whittaker was involved in Randwick's premierships in 1968, 1969, 1970, 1976 and 1983.

=== Representative career ===
Whittaker made his international début for the New Zealand national rugby league team in 1970 and went on to play for the Kiwis in twenty four matches, including four world cups. Whittaker's international career spanned thirteen seasons. Despite suffering major injuries in a motoring accident, Whittaker made a full recovery and was recalled in the early 1980s after two years out of the national side.

Whittaker then represented the Cook Islands in the 1986 Pacific Cup.

== Legacy ==
In 2012 Whittaker was named as one of the New Zealand Rugby League's Legends of League. At the Wellington Rugby League's Centenary celebrations, Whittaker was named as their player of the century. He was also named in their team of the century.

Whittaker died on 29 September 2020, aged 70.
