= Dennis A. Williams =

New Zealand international rugby league footballer

Dennis Williams
Personal information
- Full name: Dennis Arthur Williams
- Born: 1953 (age 72–73)

Playing information
- Position: Centre, Five-eighth
Club
| Years | Team | Pld | T | G | FG | P |
|---|---|---|---|---|---|---|
| 1959–80 | Te Atatu |
| 1981–?? | Glenora |
| | Total | 0 | 0 | 0 | 0 | 0 |
Representative
| Years | Team | Pld | T | G | FG | P |
| 1967–?? | Auckland |
| | New Zealand Māori |
| 1971–81 | New Zealand | 31 | 4 | 4 | 1 | 21 |

Dennis Arthur Williams is a New Zealand former rugby league international.

== Playing career ==
Williams was a Te Atatu Roosters player in the Auckland Rugby League competition. In 1977 he won the Rothville Trophy as player of the year and in 1980 he was the competition's leading goalscorer. In 1981 he again was the leading goalscorer, despite switching to local rivals the Glenora Bears.

== Representative career ==
Williams celebrated his 18th birthday with a try in his first Test match against Great Britain during the New Zealand national rugby league team' successful tour in 1971. Williams also represented New Zealand Māori.

On 21 June 1977, Williams captained Auckland to an upset win over Australia. The squad went on a grand slam, defeating the touring French and British sides in the same year.

== Legacy ==
In 1995 Williams was inducted by the New Zealand Rugby League as one of the inaugural Legends of League.
