= Gordon Smith (rugby league) =

New Zealand international rugby league footballer and coach

Personal information
- Full name: Gordon James Smith
- Born: 19 May 1955 (age 70) Greymouth, New Zealand

Playing information
- Position: Scrum-half
Club
Years	Team	Pld	T	G	FG	P
	Waro-rakau
1982–88	Hull Kingston Rovers	177	25	1	5	102
	Waro-rakau
	Halswell
	Total	177	25	1	5	102
Representative
Years	Team	Pld	T	G	FG	P
	West Coast
	South Island
1979–83	New Zealand	14	1	24	0	51

Coaching information
Club
Years	Team	Gms	W	D	L	W%
	Halswell

Gordon Smith is a New Zealand former rugby league footballer who represented New Zealand.

== Playing career ==
From the Waro-rakau club in the West Coast Rugby League competition, Smith represented both the West Coast and the South Island before being selected to play for the New Zealand national rugby league team in 1979. Smith would play in 14 Test matches between 1979 and 1983.

In 1982 Smith signed with Hull Kingston Rovers in the English competition and remained with the club until 1988, scoring 80 points for the club.

Gordon Smith was a First Division Championship winner with Hull Kingston Rovers in the 1983–84 season and the 1984–85 season.

Gordon Smith was a substitute in Hull Kingston Rovers' 14–15 defeat by Castleford in the 1984 Challenge Cup Final during the 1984–85 season at Wembley Stadium, London, on Saturday 3 May 1986, in front of a crowd of 82,134.

Gordon Smith played stand-off in Hull Kingston Rovers' 22–18 victory over Castleford in the 1985 Yorkshire Cup Final during the 1985–86 season at Headingley, Leeds on Sunday 27 October 1985.

Gordon Smith played stand-off in Hull Kingston Rovers' 8–11 defeat by Wigan in the 1985–86 John Player Special Trophy Final during the 1985–86 season at Elland Road, Leeds on Saturday 11 January 1986.

Smith rejoined Waro-rakau in the West Coast competition before moving to the Canterbury Rugby League in 1990, becoming the player-coach of Halswell.
