= Howie Tamati =

New Zealand international rugby league footballer and coach

Howie Tamati MBE
- Born: Howard Kevin Tamati; 3 January 1953 (age 73); Waitara, New Zealand
- Education: Waitara High School
- Relatives: Kevin Tamati (cousin)
- Rugby league career

Playing information
- Position: Hooker
Club
Years	Team	Pld	T	G	FG	P
	Waitara Bears (TRL)
1983–84	Wigan	29	3	0	0	12
	Total	29	3	0	0	12
Representative
Years	Team	Pld	T	G	FG	P
	Taranaki
	Central Districts
1979–85	New Zealand	24	2	0	0	6

Coaching information
Representative
Years	Team	Gms	W	D	L	W%
1986–90	Wellington
1992–93	New Zealand	10	3	1	6	30

Howard Kevin Tamati MBE (born 3 January 1953), generally known as Howie Tamati, is a New Zealand politician and former professional rugby league footballer and coach who played for New Zealand. He is the cousin of fellow international Kevin Tamati.

== Early life and family ==
Tamati was born in Waitara on 3 January 1953, the son of Esme and Kingi Tamati. Of Māori descent, he affiliates to the Te Āti Awa, Ngāti Mutunga and Ngāi Tahu iwi. He was educated at Waitara High School. Tamati is the cousin of Kevin Tamati.

Howie Tamati and Joanne Smith had three children. He is now married to Aroaro and has four more children.

== Rugby league career ==
=== Player ===
Tamati played for the Waitara Bears and represented Taranaki locally before being selected for the Kiwis in 1979. Tamati played a total of 50 games for the Kiwis, including 24 tests for them between 1979 and 1985.

Tamati played for Wigan between 1983 and 1984. He played against his cousin in the final of the 1984 Challenge Cup.

=== Coach ===
Tamati began his coaching career with the Wellington side. He then coached the New Zealand side for two years from 1992. He was replaced in 1994 by Frank Endacott.

Tamati coached the Taranaki Rockets in the 1996 Lion Red Cup and the 1997 Super League Challenge Cup.

In 1997, he was appointed the coach of the Oceania Nines Fiji national team.

Since 2007, he has been the convener of the New Zealand Kiwis selectors.

=== Administrator ===
Tamati currently serves as the Chairman of the New Zealand Māori Rugby League starting in 2004.

Tamati was the CEO of Sport Taranaki from 1994-2019. In 2013 he was appointed the president of New Zealand Rugby League.

== Political career ==
Tamati served three terms as a New Plymouth District Councillor from 1999 to 2007. He was re-elected as a councillor in October 2010. He is the former chairman of Te Ihi Tu Maori Prisoner Habilitation Centre in New Plymouth.

In 2016 he announced he would not seek re-election to the council in 2015 and won the Māori Party nomination for the Te Tai Hauāuru electorate in the 2017 New Zealand general election.

== Honours and awards ==
In 1990, Tamati was awarded the New Zealand 1990 Commemoration Medal. In the 1994 New Year Honours, he was appointed a Member of the Order of the British Empire, for services to rugby league.

Tamati was selected as the patron of New Zealand Police recruitment wing 245 in 2007. In 2008, he was named in the Taranaki Rugby League Team of the Century. He has also been inducted into the Taranaki Sports Hall of Fame.
