= Graeme West =

New Zealand rugby league coach and former rugby league footballer

Personal information
- Full name: Graeme Leonard West
- Born: 5 December 1953 (age 72) New Zealand

Playing information
- Height: 6 ft 5 in (196 cm)
- Position: Second-row, Prop
Club
Years	Team	Pld	T	G	FG	P
1971–??	Hawera
1982–91	Wigan	202	49	0	0	196
	Total	202	49	0	0	196
Representative
Years	Team	Pld	T	G	FG	P
1971–??	Taranaki
1975–85	New Zealand	17	2	0	0	7

Coaching information
Club
Years	Team	Gms	W	D	L	W%
1994–97	Wigan	71	64	2	5	90
1997–98	Widnes Vikings	38	14	1	23	37
	Total	109	78	3	28	72
- Relatives: Dwayne West (son)

Graeme Leonard West (born 5 December 1953) is a New Zealand former rugby league footballer and coach.

He played as a forward, captaining English club Wigan during a successful period for the club. West also played representative rugby league for New Zealand, winning 17 caps.

After retiring as a player, West coached Wigan from 1994 to 1997, winning nine trophies, and Widnes from 1997 to 1998.

He is the father of Super League player, Dwayne West.

== Playing career ==
West began playing club rugby league for Hawera in the Taranaki Rugby League competition. He was selected to play for the New Zealand national team in the 1975 World Cup tournament, making his Test debut against Australia. He did not play again for his country until four years later during the 1979 Great Britain Lions tour, when he was surprisingly named as captain in only his second Test appearance. He was a stand-out performer during the 1980 Kiwis tour of Britain and France, and the following year he received the Steve Watene Trophy player of the year award from the New Zealand Rugby League in recognition of his performances.

He was signed by English club Wigan for the 1982–83 Rugby Football League season from New Zealand side Taranaki. He was actually 29 when he signed, though Wigan believed him to be 2 years younger. Within weeks of him making his début, he played left-second-row in the 15–4 victory over Leeds in the 1982–83 John Player Trophy Final during the 1982–83 season at Elland Road, Leeds on Saturday 22 January 1983. He became captain in 1984, leading Wigan to Wembley for the 1984 Challenge Cup Final, which was lost to Widnes. He captained Wigan to victory in the 1985 Challenge Cup Final. West was a non playing substitute for defending champions Wigan in their 1987 World Club Challenge victory against the visiting Manly-Warringah Sea Eagles.

Graeme West played left-second-row and scored a try in Wigan's 18–26 defeat by St. Helens in the 1984 Lancashire Cup Final during the 1984–85 season at Central Park, Wigan, on Sunday 28 October 1984, played left-prop in Wigan's 34–8 victory over Warrington in the 1985 Lancashire Cup Final during the 1985–86 season at Knowsley Road, St. Helens, on Sunday 19 October 1986, and played as an interchange/substitute (replacing Prop Shaun Wane), and scored a try in the 28–16 victory Warrington in the 1987 Lancashire Cup Final during the 1987–88 season at Knowsley Road, St. Helens, on Sunday 11 October 1987.

Graeme West played left-second-row in the 11–8 victory over Hull Kingston Rovers in the 1985–86 John Player Special Trophy Final during the 1985–86 season at Elland Road, Leeds on Saturday 11 January 1986, and played left-prop in the 18–4 victory over Warrington in the 1986–87 John Player Special Trophy Final during the 1986–87 season at Burnden Park, Bolton on Saturday 10 January 1987.

He retired from the first team in 1989 to lead the reserve 'A' Team as player-coach, but made a late appearance against Castleford in 1991 due to injuries and a fixture pile up, scoring a try late in the game that gained a standing ovation.

== Coaching career ==
In 1994, following the sacking of John Dorahy, West was appointed as coach of Wigan, after fans petitioned for him to get the job. In his first month as coach, at the end of the 1993–94 Rugby Football League season West secured the First Division Premiership Trophy against Castleford, and then travelled with Wigan to Brisbane, guiding them in their 1994 World Club Challenge victory over Australian premiers, the Brisbane Broncos - the first time it was won by an English team in Australia.

At the end of his first full season, Wigan won the League Championship, Challenge Cup, Regal Trophy, and Premiership - the 'Grand Slam' of all four trophies. Even though Wigan dominated Rugby League from 1985 to 1995, it was the only season the club achieved this feat. During the 1994 Kangaroo tour Wigan hosted a match against the Australian national team but lost the match 30-20.

In 1995-96, Wigan won the championship, Premiership and Regal Trophy again.

West stayed in the role until February 1997 when, following an early exit from the Challenge Cup in 2 consecutive years, he was replaced by Eric Hughes.

After leaving Wigan, West spent short spells at Lancashire Lynx and Widnes Vikings.

== Legacy ==
In 2008 West was named in the Taranaki Rugby League Team of the Century. He still lived and worked in Wigan up to the early 2010s, but then returned to his native New Zealand.

== Sources ==
- Graeme West Wigan Playing Career Page on the Wigan RL Fansite.
- Graeme West Wigan Coaching Career Page on the Wigan RL Fansite.
- Graeme West at wiganwarriors.com
