= Shane Varley =

NZ international rugby league footballer

Personal information
- Born: New Zealand

Playing information
- Position: Scrum-half
Club
Years	Team	Pld	T	G	FG	P
	Richmond
	Point Chevalier
1981–82	Workington Town		1	0	0	3
1983–84	Leigh	23	3	0	0	12
	Total	23	4	0	0	15
Representative
Years	Team	Pld	T	G	FG	P
	Auckland
1978–84	New Zealand	11	1	0	0	3
1984	Oceania	1	0	0	0	0

Shane Varley is a New Zealand rugby league player who represented New Zealand.

== Playing career ==
Varley played for Richmond and the Point Chevalier Pirates in the Auckland Rugby League competition and represented Auckland.

He was first selected to play for New Zealand in 1978, touring Australia and Papua New Guinea. He went on to play in 11 test matches for New Zealand and was part of the 1980 tour of Great Britain and France. In 1981 he captained Auckland to a 20-10 victory over France.

He played in England for two off-seasons, playing for Workington Town in 1981-82 and Leigh in 1983-84.

Varley's last test match for New Zealand was in 1984. Also that year he represented Oceania in a match against Europe, held to celebrate French Rugby League's 50th anniversary.
