= Michael O'Donnell (rugby league) =

New Zealand international rugby league footballer

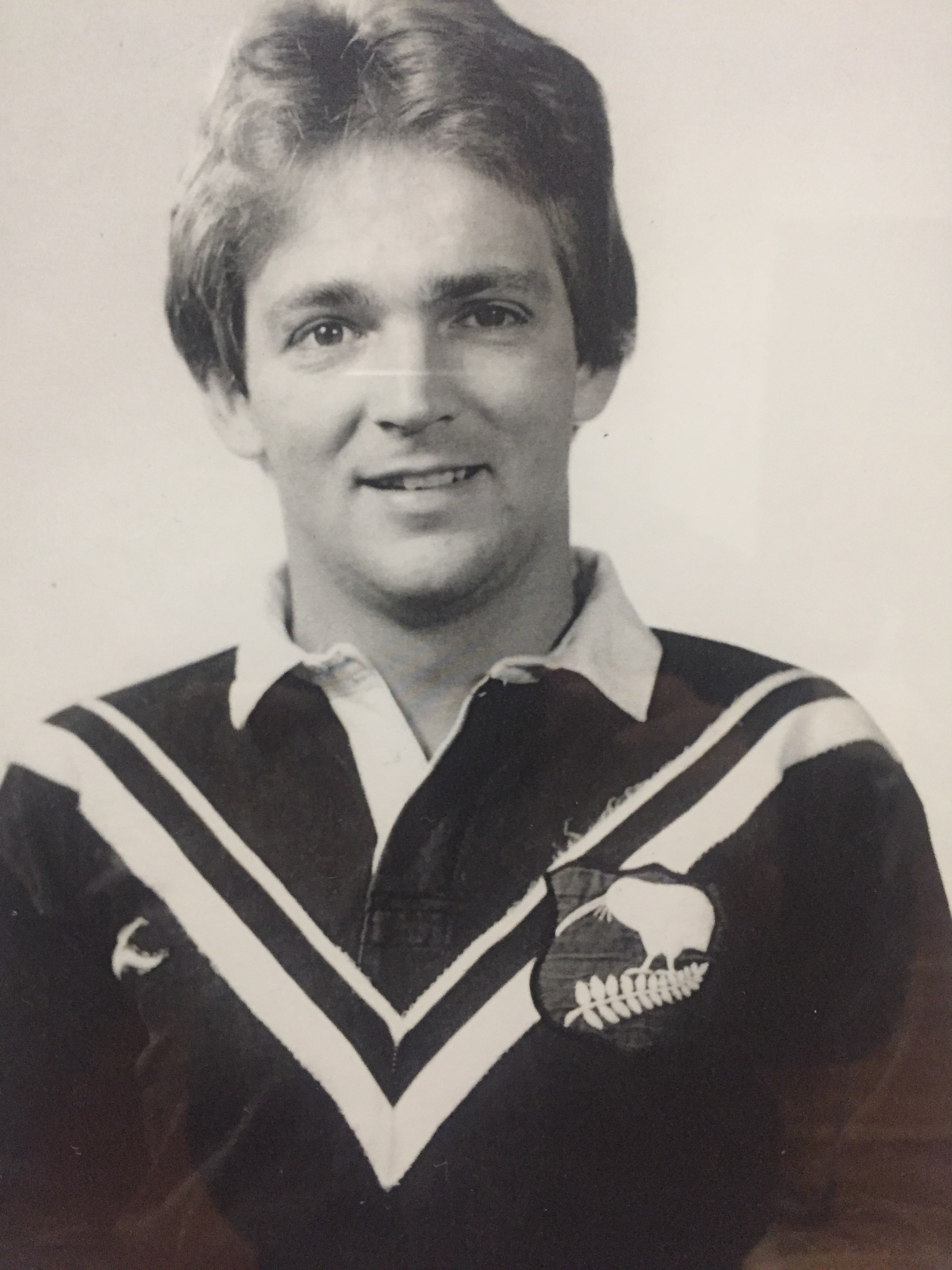
- Michael O'Donnell, "Kiwi" 1977, 78, 80, 81

Personal information
- Full name: Michael William O'Donnell
- Born: 24 July 1952 (age 74) New Zealand

Playing information
- Position: Fullback, Centre
Club
Years	Team	Pld	T	G	FG	P
1970–86	Marist-Western Suburbs		87	713	0	1668
Representative
Years	Team	Pld	T	G	FG	P
1971–82	Canterbury	48	8	84	0	192
1971–81	South Island	16
1977–81	New Zealand	10	2	6	0	18

Michael O'Donnell is a New Zealand former rugby league footballer who represented New Zealand in the 1977 World Cup.

== Playing career ==
Originally from the West Coast, O'Donnell was a Schoolboy Kiwi before moving to Canterbury in 1970. He played most of his football at centre, although nine of the Test matches were at fullback.

O'Donnell played for the Marist-Western Suburbs club in the Canterbury Rugby League competition between 1970 and 1986. In 1972 O'Donnell shared the Turner and Le Brun Cup as top-equal goalscorer in the competition.

He first represented Canterbury in 1971 and went on to earn 48 caps for his province and also represent the South Island. He first made the New Zealand national rugby league team in 1977 for the World Cup and went on to play in 28 matches for the Kiwis, scoring 68 points (6 tries, 25 goals), including ten Test matches between 1977 and 1981. He was unavailable for the Kiwis in 1982 and broke his leg early in the 1983 season.

O'Donnell moved to Auckland in 1986 to pursue business interests.
