= Alan Rushton =

New Zealand international rugby league footballer

Personal information
- Full name: Alan Phillip Rushton
- Born: 26 September 1950 (age 75) New Zealand

Playing information
- Position: Hooker, Prop, Second-row
Club
Years	Team	Pld	T	G	FG	P
	Eastern Suburbs
	Hornby
1986	Linwood
	Total	0	0	0	0	0
Representative
Years	Team	Pld	T	G	FG	P
1970–81	Canterbury	41
1974–81	South Island
1977–81	New Zealand	13	1	0	0	3

Alan Rushton is a New Zealand former rugby league footballer who represented New Zealand in the 1977 World Cup.

== Playing career ==
Originally a second-row, Rushton moved to prop and then to hooker as his career evolved.

Rushton was a Canterbury and South Island representative and was part of the Canterbury side that defeated Auckland 15-14 in 1975. He was first selected for the New Zealand national rugby league team in 1977 for the World Cup. Rushton went on to play 28 matches for New Zealand, including in thirteen test matches between 1977 and 1981.

Rushton captained Canterbury in six matches in 1980. He was a Kiwi from the Eastern Suburbs and Hornby clubs and played for Linwood in 1986.
