= Fred Ah Kuoi =

New Zealand international rugby league footballer

Fred Ah Kuoi MNZM
- Ah Kuoi in 2026

Personal information
- Born: 7 June 1956 (age 70) Apia, Western Samoa

Playing information
- Height: 5 ft 11 in (180 cm)
- Weight: 12 st 5 lb (78 kg)
- Position: Centre, Five-eighth
Club
Years	Team	Pld	T	G	FG	P
1973–80	Richmond
1981–83	North Sydney Bears	27	4	0	0	12
1983–87	Hull FC	125	28	0	1	113
1987	Richmond
	Total	152	32	0	1	125
Representative
Years	Team	Pld	T	G	FG	P
1975–80	Auckland	10	5	0	0	15
1975	New Zealand Māori	2	2	0	0	6
1975–85	New Zealand	28	5	0	0	17

Coaching information
Club
Years	Team	Gms	W	D	L	W%
1988–98	Richmond

Freddie Ah Kuoi MNZM (born 7 June 1956) is a Samoa-born New Zealand former professional rugby league footballer who represented New Zealand.

== Early years ==
Ah Kuoi was born in Apia, Western Samoa, in 1956 and emigrated to New Zealand in 1962 with his parents, Fred Snr and Siutu Ah Kuoi, and his two younger brothers, Peter and Afi. Brothers Andrew and Paul and sister Elizabeth were born in Auckland, New Zealand.

Paul later played for Marist Richmond, Glenora and represented Samoa. Both Peter and Andrew represented New Zealand universities in rugby league with Peter being selected into the 1976 team, while Andrew toured England and France in 1984 with the New Zealand Universities team. Fred Ah Kuoi also played for Auckland University in several university winter tournaments, but was never chosen by the national selectors.

== Playing career ==
Ah Kuoi began his career in 1973 playing for Richmond in the Auckland Rugby League competition. He was part of the Richmond side that won the championship in 1979.

Ah Kuoi moved to Sydney in 1981 to play professionally for the North Sydney Bears, then to England to join his former teammates, James Leuluai, Gary Kemble and Dane O'Hara, at Hull FC from 1983 to 1987.

Ah Kuoi played stand-off in Hull's 24–28 defeat by Wigan in the 1985 Challenge Cup Final during the 1984–85 season at Wembley Stadium, London on Saturday 4 May 1985, in front of a crowd of 99,801, in what is regarded as the most marvellous cup final in living memory, which Hull narrowly lost after fighting back from down 12–28 at half-time.

Ah Kuoi played stand-off in Hull's 29–12 victory over Hull Kingston Rovers in the 1984 Yorkshire Cup Final during the 1984–85 season at Boothferry Park, Kingston upon Hull on Saturday 27 October 1984, and played stand-off in the 24–31 defeat by Castleford in the 1986 Yorkshire Cup Final during the 1986–87 season at Headingley, Leeds on Saturday 11 October 1986.

Fred Ah Kuoi played at centre in Hull's 0–12 defeat by Hull Kingston Rovers in the 1984–85 John Player Special Trophy Final during the 1984–85 season at Boothferry Park, Kingston upon Hull on Saturday 26 January 1985.

Debuting at home versus Hull KR on 2/10/1983 he went on to play for Hull 126 times (including 10 as sub), scoring 28 tries and 1 drop goal for 113 points. Ever versatile, in addition to his main half back role he was also able to play in most of the back positions and even as hooker when need be. In his last year with Hull, 1986 he also became assistant coach to Kenny Foulkes, before finishing his career by returning to Richmond before retiring at the end of the 1987 New Zealand season.

== Representative career ==
Ah Kuoi represented Auckland between 1975 and 1980.

Ah Kuoi made his international début for New Zealand Māori in 1975, at the age of 18. He toured Australia with the side, participated in the 1975 Pacific Cup and faced Australia, Wales, England and France in New Zealand.

That same year, he made the national Kiwi team, touring England and France during the World Cup series. He was Vice Captain in 1979, 80, 81 and 83 and captained the New Zealand team in 1979, becoming New Zealand's youngest ever Captain at just 22, leading the 18-11 3rd test victory over Britain's Tourists (after they'd lost the first two under Graham West) then again in 1984 when he led New Zealand to their first 3–0 victory over a Great Britain Touring Team - also meaning that New Zealand had never lost a game when Ah Kuoi was Captain. During the 1980 tour of Great Britain and France, Ah Kuoi was man of the match in the 14-14 1st test at Wigan and voted the "Most Valuable Player" of the tour also being given the world No. 1 ranking in the 5/8th position, by the English press.

In 1983 he was a member of the team that beat the Australians for the first time since 1971, at Lang Park in Brisbane, Australia. He represented the New Zealand "Kiwi" rugby league team from 1975 to 1985, achieving 28 test appearances.

== Later years ==
Ah Kuoi married his wife Margot in Sydney, Australia on 9 June 1982. Their daughter, Danielle, was born in Sydney on 3 June 1983; their son, Joshua, was born on 9 July 1985 in Hull, and their youngest daughter, Madeleine, was born in Auckland, NZ on 3 December 1988.

Ah Kuoi coached the Richmond Bulldogs from 1988 to 89, and again in 1997 and 1998.

Ah Kuoi lived in Ponsonby, Auckland, working as a senior residential youth mentor at the Auckland Dream Centre.

In the 2026 King’s Birthday Honours, Ah Kuoi was appointed a Member of the New Zealand Order of Merit, for services to rugby league and the community.
