= Olsen Filipaina =

NZ international rugby league footballer (1957–2022)

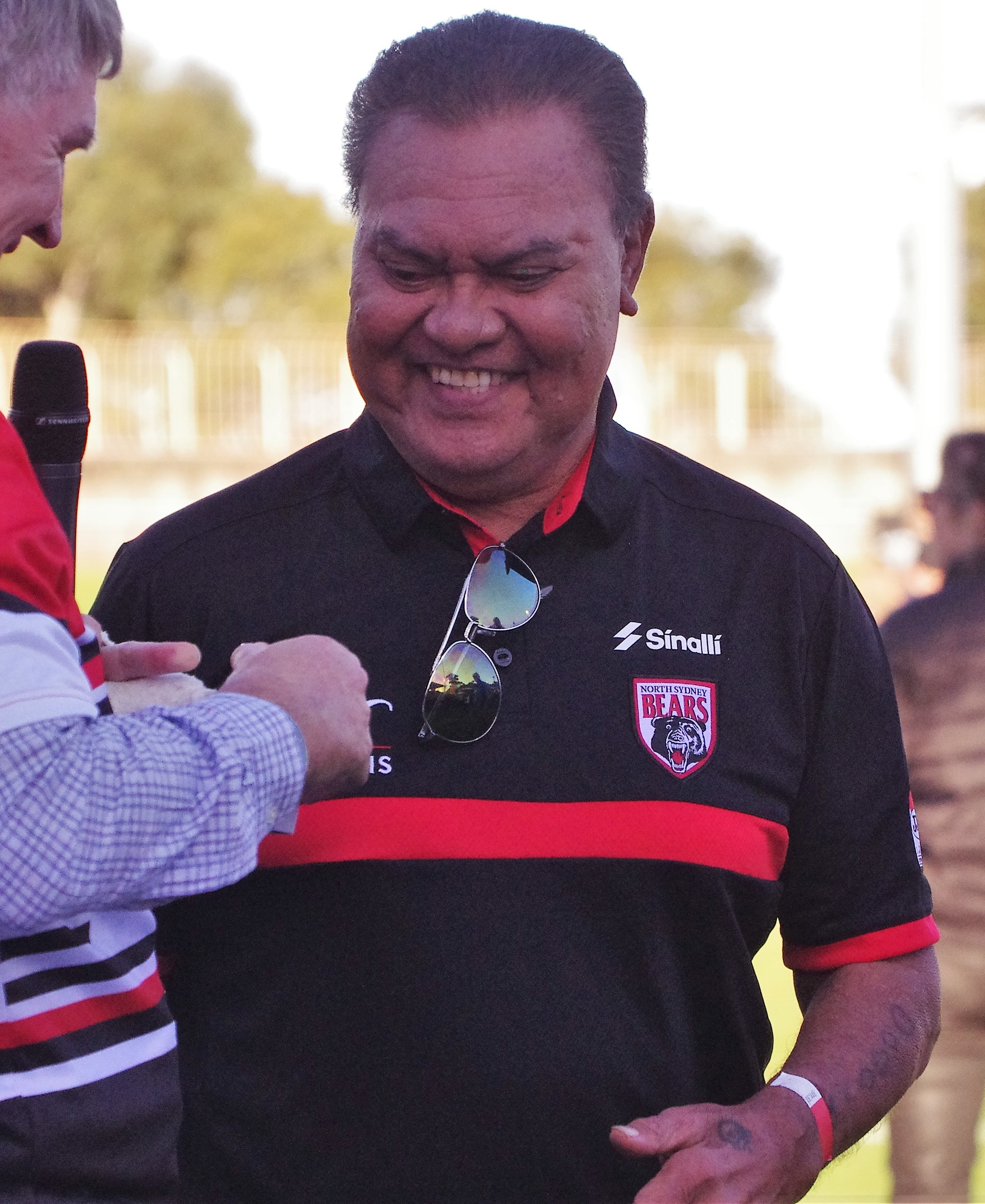
- Filipaina in 2021

Personal information
- Full name: Olsen Orekewa Filipaina
- Born: 23 April 1957 Kaikohe, New Zealand
- Died: 10 February 2022 (aged 64) Westmead, New South Wales, Australia

Playing information
- Height: 184 cm (6 ft 0 in)
- Weight: 130 kg (20 st 7 lb)
- Position: Centre, Five-eighth
Club
Years	Team	Pld	T	G	FG	P
19??–79	Mangere East
1980–84	Balmain Tigers	77	19	83	0	225
1985	Eastern Suburbs	8	0	21	0	42
1986–87	North Sydney Bears	18	2	24	0	56
	Total	103	21	128	0	323
Representative
Years	Team	Pld	T	G	FG	P
	Auckland
1977–86	New Zealand	28	6	44	0	108
1988	Western Samoa

Olsen Orekewa Filipaina (23 April 1957 – 10 February 2022) was a professional rugby league footballer who represented both New Zealand and Western Samoa. He played for the Balmain Tigers, Eastern Suburbs, and North Sydney Bears during his New South Wales Rugby League (NSWRL) premiership career from 1980 to 1987.

== Early life ==
Filipaina was born in Kaikohe, New Zealand, on 23 April 1957. His mother was Māori and his father was from Samoa. He was raised in Māngere, and started his career with the Mangere East Hawks in the Auckland Rugby League competition.

== Playing career ==
While playing for the Hawks, Filipaina was named the best back in the competition in 1977, before winning the Rothville Trophy as player of the year the following season.

Filipaina moved to Sydney in 1980, joining the Balmain Tigers. He spent five seasons at the club, playing in 82 games and amassing 225 points. After a one-year spell at the Eastern Suburbs Roosters in 1985, he played for two years with the North Sydney Bears. During his time in the NSWRL Premiership, Filipaina suffered racial abuse and sledging from both players and supporters. He later captained Ryde-Eastwood to victory in the inaugural Metropolitan Cup final in 1990.

== Representative career ==
An Auckland representative, Filipaina was part of the Auckland side that defeated Great Britain, Australia and France within the span of 20 days in 1977.

Filipaina was first picked for the New Zealand national rugby league team in 1977, becoming the first junior player from the Hawks to be selected. In 1983 and again in 1985, he was picked for the Kiwis despite playing in the Sydney reserve grade competition. On both occasions, he played a pivotal role in the Kiwis defeating Australia. He was named the man of the series in 1985. He also made six appearances at the 1977 and 1985–1986 editions of the Rugby League World Cup. He eventually retired from the Kiwis in 1987.

In total, Filipaina played in 50 matches for New Zealand, including 28 tests where he scored 108 points. As of 2010, his 108 points places him sixth on the point scoring list.

Filipaina subsequently changed his national representation to Western Samoa, his father's country of origin. He captained the team in the 1988 Pacific Cup, as well as its inaugural test match that same year.

== Later years ==
Filipaina remained in Sydney after his retirement, living in Ryde. He worked the same garbage run the Balmain Tigers helped him get when he first moved to Australia. From this job he received the nickname “The Galloping Garbo” during his playing days.

Filipaina was named one of New Zealand Rugby League's "Legends of League" in 2007. His biography, The Big O: The Life and Times of Olsen Filipaina, was published in April 2020 and recounted the racial abuse he endured throughout his career.

== Personal life ==
Filipaina was the son of a Samoan boxer and a Maori mother. He was born in Kaikohe, New Zealand. He has five children: Louise, John, Alysha, Quin and Jazmine, and five grandchildren: Tamati, Matahi, Ignatius, Kaimana and Octavia. Two of his brothers, Jerry and Alf, are involved in politics in Auckland. Filipaina's son, Quin, played in the Harold Matthews Cup side for the Tigers. Another son, John, was arrested in 2006 and charged with robbery.

In mid-January 2022, Filipaina was admitted to Westmead Hospital with a stomach infection. His condition slowly deteriorated and he died of kidney failure on 10 February 2022, 72 days short of his 65th birthday.
