= Kevin Tamati =

New Zealand international rugby league footballer and coach

Personal information
- Full name: Kevin Ronald Tamati
- Born: 21 September 1953 (age 72) Bridge Pa, Hawke's Bay, New Zealand

Playing information
- Height: 178 cm (5 ft 10 in)
- Weight: 95 kg (14 st 13 lb)
- Position: Prop, Second-row
Club
Years	Team	Pld	T	G	FG	P
1971–74	Petone Panthers
1975–80	Upper Hutt Tigers
1981–82	Randwick
1982–85	Widnes	96	15	1	0	58
1984	Randwick
1984–85	Northcote Tigers
1985–89	Warrington	105+11	6	0	0	24
1990–91	Salford	5+2	0	0	0	0
	Total	219	21	1	0	82
Representative
Years	Team	Pld	T	G	FG	P
1972–82	Wellington	52
1984	Auckland
1975–80	New Zealand Māori
1979–85	New Zealand	22	1	0	0	3

Coaching information
Club
Years	Team	Gms	W	D	L	W%
1989–93	Salford
1994–98	Chorley Borough
1999–00	Whitehaven
	Total	0	0	0	0
Representative
Years	Team	Gms	W	D	L	W%
2006	New Zealand Māori
- Education: Hastings Boys' High School
- Relatives: Howie Tamati (cousin)

Kevin Ronald Tamati (born 21 September 1953) is a New Zealand former rugby league representative player and coach. He played at representative level for New Zealand, New Zealand Māori, Auckland, Central Districts and Wellington, and professionally at club level for Widnes, Warrington and Salford, Chorley Borough in the forwards. He has coached the New Zealand Māori, and professionally for Salford, Chorley Borough/Lancashire Lynx, British Army Rugby League and Whitehaven. He is the cousin of fellow international Howie Tamati.

== Early life and family ==
Born in 1953 of Ngāti Kahungunu and Ngāti Mutunga descent, Tamati was educated at Hastings Boys' High School. He is the cousin of Howie Tamati.

== Playing career ==
After moving to Wellington in 1971 Tamati took up rugby league, joining the Petone Panthers club. He later played for the Upper Hutt Tigers and the Randwick Kingfishers. He made the Junior Kiwis in 1973. A Wellington representative, Tamati made a name for himself as a tough player.

He moved to England in 1982 and had success with both Widnes and Warrington. During the 1984 season Tamati played on Saturday for the Northcote Tigers in the Auckland Rugby League competition and then flew down to Wellington on Sundays to play for the Randwick Kingfishers. During this season Tamati also represented Auckland.

A Wellington representative and New Zealand international, Tamati played 52 times for Wellington and for the Kiwis from 1979 until 1985. He is perhaps best known for his fight with Australian prop Greg Dowling which continued on the sideline after both players had been sent to the sin-bin by French referee Julien Rascagneres. Tamati won caps for New Zealand in 1979 against Great Britain (3 matches), in 1980 against Australia (2 matches), and Great Britain (3 matches), and France (2 matches), in 1981 against France, while at Widnes in 1982 against Australia (2 matches), and Papua New Guinea, in 1984 against Great Britain, in 1985 against Australia (2 matches), in 1985 in the 1985–1988 Rugby League World Cup against Australia, in 1985 against Great Britain (interchange/substitute), and in 1985 in the 1985–1988 Rugby League World Cup against Great Britain. In total Tamati playing in 37 games for the Kiwis, including 29 test matches.

=== Premiership Final appearances ===
Kevin Tamati played in Warrington's 38–10 victory over Halifax in the Premiership Final during the 1985–86 season at Elland Road, Leeds on Sunday 18 May 1986.

=== Challenge Cup Final appearances ===
Kevin Tamati played at prop in Widnes' 19–6 victory over Wigan in the 1984 Challenge Cup Final during the 1983–84 season at Wembley Stadium, London on Saturday 5 May 1984, in front of a crowd of 80,116.

=== County Cup Final appearances ===
Kevin Tamati played at prop in Widnes' 8–12 defeat by Barrow in the 1983 Lancashire Cup Final during the 1983–84 season at Central Park, Wigan on Saturday 1 October 1983, appeared as a substitute (replacing Second-row Les Boyd) in Warrington's 8–34 defeat by Wigan in the 1985 Lancashire Cup Final during the 1985–86 season at Knowsley Road, St. Helens, on Sunday 13 October 1985, and played at prop in the 16–28 defeat by Wigan in the 1987 Lancashire Cup Final during the 1987–88 season at Knowsley Road, St. Helens on Sunday 11 October 1987.

=== John Player Special Trophy Final appearances ===
Kevin Tamati played at prop in Widnes' 10-18 defeat by Leeds in the 1983–84 John Player Special Trophy Final during the 1983–84 season at Central Park, Wigan on Saturday 14 January 1984, and played hooker (replaced by substitute Alan Rathbone at half-time) in Warrington's 4-18 defeat by Wigan in the 1986–87 John Player Special Trophy Final during the 1986–87 season at Burnden Park, Bolton on Saturday 10 January 1987.

== Coaching career ==
Tamati coached the Salford from 1989 until 1993.

Tamati was employed as a rugby league development officer with Warrington Borough Council for nine years from 1989 to 1997 when he left in 1997 to take up a full-time position coaching the Lancashire Lynx. Tamati had previously been coaching Chorley Borough part-time, but the club's rebirth as the Lancashire Lynx prompted him to take up the roll full-time. Tamati was released by Lynx at end of the 1998 season, after failing to agree a new contract.

Tamati then began a two-year spell coaching the Whitehaven.

In 2006 Tamati was coach of the New Zealand Māori rugby league team.

== Later years ==
Tamati was inducted into the New Zealand Rugby League Legends of League in 1995. He is an Auckland Rugby League Immortal.

Tamati is currently chairman and referee coordinator for Rugby League Hawkes Bay.

Tamati was named at Prop in the Petone Panthers' Team of the Century in 2012.

In 2012 he was named in the Wellington Rugby League's Team of the Century.

In 2024, he joined the second season of The Restaurant That Makes Mistakes, as he was diagnosed with dementia in 2021. He was mentored by Chef Ben Bayly to become a chef. On episode 2, he personally served dishes for his former teammates, including Hugh McGhan, Dean Bell, Frano Botica and Dane O'Hara.
