= Mark Broadhurst (rugby league) =

New Zealand international rugby league footballer and coach

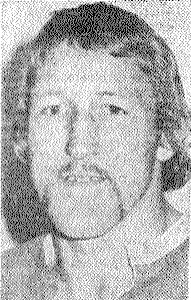

Personal information
- Full name: Mark Edward Broadhurst
- Born: 8 April 1955 (age 71) Christchurch, New Zealand

Playing information
- Position: Prop
Club
Years	Team	Pld	T	G	FG	P
19??–77	Papanui (CRL)
1978–80	Marist-Western Suburbs
1981–82	Manly-Warringah	44	6	0	0	18
1983	Illawarra Steelers	24	1	0	1	5
1983–87	Hull Kingston Rovers	95	10	0	0	40
1985–86	Papanui (CRL)
	Total	163	17	0	1	63
Representative
Years	Team	Pld	T	G	FG	P
1975–80	Canterbury	27
	South Island	8
1979–83	New Zealand	17	0	0	0	0

Coaching information
Club
Years	Team	Gms	W	D	L	W%
1986	Papanui (CRL)

Mark Edward Broadhurst (born 8 April 1955) is a New Zealand former rugby league footballer. He played professionally in Australia and the United Kingdom, and played for New Zealand from 1979 to 1983.

== Playing career ==
He was a Schoolboy Kiwi in 1970 and played in the Canterbury Rugby League competition for Papanui. Broadhurst represented Canterbury, the South Island and New Zealand before moving overseas to play for the Manly-Warringah Sea Eagles, Illawarra Steelers and Hull Kingston Rovers.

One of the most memorable incidents in his career was his brawl with Newtown Jets player Steve Bowden during the minor semi-final match of the 1981 NSWRFL season.

=== County Cup Final appearances ===
Mark Broadhurst played left-prop in Hull Kingston Rovers' 12–29 defeat by Hull F.C. in the 1984 Yorkshire Cup Final during the 1984–85 season at Boothferry Park, Kingston upon Hull, on Saturday 27 October 1984.

=== John Player Special Trophy Final appearances ===
Mark Broadhurst played left-prop in Hull Kingston Rovers' 12–0 victory over Hull F.C. in the 1984–85 John Player Special Trophy Final during the 1984–85 season at Boothferry Park, Kingston upon Hull on Saturday 26 January 1985.

== Later years ==
Broadhurst later coached Papanui in the Canterbury Rugby League competition. In 2020, Broadhurst revealed that he had been diagnosed with Alzheimer's disease.

== Honours and legacy ==
In 2013, Broadhurst was inducted as a New Zealand Legend of League.

Since 2018, the Manly Warringah Sea Eagles and the New Zealand Warriors have played for the Broadhurst-Shelford trophy, named for Mark Broadhurst and the late Kiwis prop Adrian Shelford.
