= Gary Prohm =

NZ international rugby league footballer and coach

Personal information
- Full name: Gary John Prohm
- Born: 3 October 1956 (age 70) New Zealand

Playing information
- Position: Wing, Centre, Second-row, Lock
Club
Years	Team	Pld	T	G	FG	P
	Otahuhu Leopards
1982–86	Hull Kingston Rovers	147	104	0	0	399
1986–87	Eastern Suburbs	28	5	0	0	20
1988	Mount Albert Lions
	Total	175	109	0	0	419
Representative
Years	Team	Pld	T	G	FG	P
	Auckland
1978–86	New Zealand	23	4	0	0	12

Gary Prohm (born 3 October 1956) is a New Zealand former rugby league footballer and coach who represented New Zealand, including in matches that counted towards the 1988 World Cup.

== Playing career ==
Prohm played in the Auckland Rugby League competition for Otahuhu and played for Auckland. In 1978 he made his début for the New Zealand national rugby league team. He played 23 Test Matches between 1978 and 1986.

Prohm moved to England in 1982, joining Hull Kingston Rovers. He went on to play for four seasons for the club and claimed the club record for tries in as season by scoring 45 tries in 1984–85 season before leaving in 1986 to join Eastern Suburbs in Australia for two years.

=== Rugby League Championship ===
Prohm played in Hull Kingston Rovers Championship winning teams of the 1983–84 season and 1984–85 season.

=== Challenge Cup Final appearances ===
Prohm played at centre and scored two tries in Hull Kingston Rovers' 14–15 defeat by Castleford in the 1984 Challenge Cup Final during the 1984–85 season at Wembley Stadium, London, on Saturday 3 May 1986, in front of a crowd of 82,134.

=== John Player Special Trophy Final appearances ===
Prohm played at centre and scored a try in Hull Kingston Rovers' 12-0 victory over Hull F.C. in the 1984–85 John Player Special Trophy Final during the 1984–85 season at Boothferry Park, Kingston upon Hull on Saturday 26 January 1985.

=== Premiership Trophy Final Appearances ===
Prohm played at centre and scored a try in Hull Kingston Rovers' 18-10 victory over Castleford Tigers in the Final of the 1983-84 Rugby League Premiership during the 1983–84 season.

Prohm played at centre in Hull Kingston Rovers' 36-16 defeat against St.Helens in the Final of the 1984-85 Rugby League Premiership during the 1984-85 season.

=== County Cup Final appearances ===
Prohm played at centre in Hull Kingston Rovers' 12–29 defeat by Hull F.C. in the 1984 Yorkshire Cup Final during the 1984–85 season at Boothferry Park, Kingston upon Hull, on Saturday 27 October 1984.

Prohm played at centre, in the 22–18 victory over Castleford in the 1985–86 Yorkshire Cup Final during the 1985–86 season at Headingley, Leeds, on Sunday 27 October 1985.

=== 1982 Kangaroo Tour ===
Prohm played loose forward and scored a try in Hull Kingston Rovers' 30-10 defeat against the 1982 Kangaroos.

=== 1983 Queensland Tour ===
Prohm played left-wing in Hull Kingston Rovers' 8-6 victory over Queensland as they toured Papua New Guinea and England part of the 1983–84 Rugby Football League season.

== Later years ==
In 1994 Prohm coached the new Auckland City Vulcans in the Lion Red Cup competition.

He now runs Gary Prohm Automotive in Royal Oak.
