= Tony Coll =

New Zealand rugby league footballer and coach (1952–2020)

Personal information
- Full name: Anthony Peter Coll
- Born: 7 February 1952
- Died: 14 May 2020 (aged 68) Karoro, New Zealand

Playing information
- Weight: 87 kg (13 st 10 lb; 192 lb)
- Position: Second-row
Club
Years	Team	Pld	T	G	FG	P
1970	Marist-West Suburbs
Representative
Years	Team	Pld	T	G	FG	P
1970	Canterbury	1
	West Coast	58
	South Island
1972–82	New Zealand	30	4	1	0	14

Coaching information
Club
Years	Team	Gms	W	D	L	W%
	Marist (WCRL)
Representative
Years	Team	Gms	W	D	L	W%
	West Coast

Anthony Peter Coll (7 February 1952 – 14 May 2020) was a New Zealand professional rugby league footballer and coach who represented New Zealand in three World Cups.

== Early life and family ==
Coll grew up on the West Coast. He was the son of Peter Coll—a West Coast rugby league representative who played in the team that defeated the touring Great Britain side in 1946—and the uncle of squash player Paul Coll. He was educated at Marist Brothers High School, Greymouth.

== Playing career ==
A West Coast representative, Coll played in 65 games (including 30 tests) for the New Zealand national rugby league team including three world cups. Coll trialled for the 1971 Kiwis unsuccessfully, however he was selected the following year. He was the Kiwis' captain at the 1977 World Cup.

Coll also had a brief spell in the Canterbury Rugby League competition, playing with Marist-Western Suburbs and representing Canterbury.

== Later years ==
Coll coached the West Coast in 1986 and 1987.

He was made a New Zealand Rugby League "Legends of League" in 2007.

He ran a sports store in Greymouth. In 2011 Coll was elected to the Grey District Council in a by-election.

Coll suffered a heart attack in 2019. On 14 May 2020, he died aged 68 after suffering a second heart attack while biking near Karoro.
