= Dane O'Hara =

New Zealand international rugby league footballer

Personal information
- Full name: Dane Bradford Mark O'Hara
- Born: 15 November 1953 (age 72) New Zealand

Playing information
- Position: Wing
Club
Years	Team	Pld	T	G	FG	P
19??	Bay Roskill (ARL)
1981–90	Hull FC	271	116	0	0	432
1990–91	Doncaster RLFC	8	3	0	0	12
	Total	279	119	0	0	444
Representative
Years	Team	Pld	T	G	FG	P
1976–80	Auckland	6	2	0	0	6
1977–86	New Zealand	36	15	0	0	52

Dane Bradford Mark O'Hara is a New Zealand former rugby league footballer who represented New Zealand. At the time of his retirement he held the record for most international matches for New Zealand.

== Early years ==
O'Hara attended St. Paul's College in Auckland and played for the Bay Roskill Vikings when they amalgamated in 1979. He toured Australia in 1973 with the Auckland under-23 side.

== Playing career ==
After establishing himself in the Auckland Rugby League competition and representing Auckland, O'Hara moved to England and joined Hull FC in 1981, playing alongside fellow Kiwis Gary Kemble and James Leuluai and then, from 1983, another New Zealand Captain, Fred Ah Kuoi. He began his Hull career on 27 September 1981 when 16,159 turned out to the Boulevard to see both O'Hara and Leuluai début in a 42–24 win (Kemble had already appeared) against Castleford. O'Hara suffered a punctured lung and rib damage after being hit by the knee of a Castleford player. He was fortunate to recover quickly, missing only three games, and went on to play 9 seasons for the club and to the age of 35, becoming an automatic choice in the Hull line up. Achievements in that first year included helping Hull to win the John Player Trophy, also being Premiership runners up, and to lift the Challenge Cup in 1982, the first victory for Hull since 1914. Recognised throughout the game as a true gentleman, both on and off the field, by the time he left Hull for Doncaster in 1990, where injuries restricted him to just 8 appearances, no overseas player had ever made more appearances or scored more tries for Hull than O'Hara.

Amongst his many outstanding performances, Dane O'Hara played on the wing, and scored a try in Hull FC's 14-14 draw with Widnes in the 1982 Challenge Cup Final during the 1981–82 season at Wembley Stadium, London on Saturday 1 May 1982, in front of a crowd of 92,147, he was ruled out of Hull's 18–9 win in the replay at Elland Road through injury (Clive Sullivan played in his place). In the final O'Hara scored Hull's second try which tied the game at 14 all. He also played a crucial part in chasing Stuart Wright the Widnes wing when Wright intercepted a pass and forced him to score too wide out for the try to be converted, setting up the draw, and subsequent successful replay, the first time the Cup had returned to the Boulevard since 1914. O'Hara played on the wing in Hull FC's 24-28 defeat by Wigan in the 1985 Challenge Cup Final during the 1984–85 season at Wembley Stadium, London on Saturday 4 May 1985, in front of a crowd of 99,801, in what is regarded as the most marvellous cup final in living memory, which Hull narrowly lost after fighting back from 12-28 down at half-time. O'Hara captained the side in his last full season, 1990, leading Hull to a (losing) Premiership play-off final at Old Trafford, the only major trophy to elude him in his time in England. O'Hara played on the wing and scored a try in Hull FC's 13-2 victory over Castleford in the 1983 Yorkshire Cup Final during the 1983–84 season at Elland Road, Leeds on Saturday 15 October 1983, played on the wing in the 29-12 victory over Hull Kingston Rovers in the 1984 Yorkshire Cup Final during the 1984–85 season at Boothferry Park, Kingston upon Hull on Saturday 27 October 1984, and played at centre and scored two tries in the 24-31 defeat by Castleford in the 1986 Yorkshire Cup Final during the 1986–87 season at Headingley, Leeds on Saturday 11 October 1986. O'Hara played on the wing and scored four conversions in Hull FC's 12-4 victory over Hull Kingston Rovers in the 1981–82 John Player Trophy Final during the 1981–82 season at Headingley, Leeds on Saturday 23 January 1982, played on the wing in the 12-0 victory over Hull Kingston Rovers in the 1984–85 John Player Special Trophy Final during the 1984–85 season at Boothferry Park, Kingston upon Hull on Saturday 26 January 1985. Such was the commitment of those early Kiwis to British Rugby League that in 1986 the Government and Rugby Football League agreed to change rules and by-laws to enable such overseas players to qualify as non quota players. When Hull hit financial difficulties and were forced to sell Lee Crooks to Leeds for a then record fee O'Hara agreed to take a pay cut in his contract renewal, staying with Hull through good times and bad. He received a testimonial year in 1989 / 1990, having achieved a remarkable 300 appearances for Club and Country, becoming the first overseas player ever to be awarded such a benefit.

His last game in the UK was for Doncaster in January 1992.

== Representative career ==
O'Hara was first selected for the New Zealand national rugby league team in 1977, playing in the 1977 World Cup. He went on to play thirty six test matches between 1977 and 1986, captaining the Kiwis twice in 1980.

O'Hara was the fastest sprinter in New Zealand's 1980 tour of Britain party, scoring most tries (6) and making most appearances (9 plus 2 as sub) on tour. He finished his international career with a total of 36 tests, 75 appearances and 15 tries*—equaling Phil Orchards long standing record.

== Testimonial match ==
Dane O'Hara's Testimonial match at Hull F.C. took place in 1990.
