= 1986 New Zealand rugby league season =

Seasons
- 1985 1987

The 1986 New Zealand rugby league season was the 79th season of rugby league that had been played in New Zealand. The main feature of the year was the Interdistricts Series competition that was run by the New Zealand Rugby League. Auckland won the series, defeating the other three inter-district teams.

== International competitions ==
The New Zealand national rugby league team lost a three test series to Australia. Coached by Graham Lowe, the squad was: Darrell Williams, Joe Ropati, Dean Bell, James Leuluai, Dane O'Hara, Olsen Filipaina, Shane Cooper, Owen Wright, Wayne Wallace, Kurt Sorensen, Mark Graham, Hugh McGahan, Gary Prohm, Mark Elia, Ron O'Regan, Gary Kemble, Gary Freeman, Barry Harvey and Brent Todd. Peter Brown, Tea Ropati, Marty Crequer, Dean Lonergan, Adrian Shelford, Sam Stewart, James Goulding, Glenn Donaldson and Gary Mercer also played for the Kiwis in New Zealand and Papua New Guinea. New Zealand lost to Australia 8-22, 12-29 and 12–32. In the tour games the Kiwis defeated Newcastle 22–17, Riverina 14–16, Wide Bay 32-7 and North Queensland 46–6. In Papua New Guinea they defeated Island Zone 26–6, lost to Southern Zone 20-26 and then won the first Test against Papua New Guinea 36–26. They then lost the second Test match 22–24, a match which counted towards the 1988 World Cup. Lowe resigned in August and Tony Gordon was appointed coach in September.

Howie Tamati captained the New Zealand Universities side in the first World University Cup. The New Zealand side defeated Australia 14–10 in the final to win the trophy. The side also included John, Peter, Iva and Tea Ropati.

The New Zealand Māori side competed in the Pacific Cup, winning the tournament by defeating Western Samoa 23 – 6 in the final. Coached by Richard Bolton, the squad included Gary Mercer, Dave Watson, Adrian Shelford, Mark Woods, Anthony Murray, captain Sam Stewart, Mark Horo, Tawera Nikau and Mike Kuiti. Hugh McGahan, Ron O'Regan, Owen Wright, Tracey McGregor, Andrew Vincent and Brendon Tuuta all pulled out of the side due to injury or professional club commitments. The Māori side played a warm up game before the competition began, defeating Waikato 52–32. It was the first time in over two decades that the Māori side was comprised completely of Māori players, as the side had previously also picked Polynesian players. Mercer, Ramsay, Shelford, Stewart and Greene were named in the team of the tournament.

Bob Bailey coached the Junior Kiwis. The side twice thrashed the Papua New Guinea juniors, 52-6 and 56–4. The team included Kevin Iro, Paul Okesene, Dean Clarke, Robert Piva, Tony Kemp, and Tawera Nikau.

Hugh McGahan won the New Zealand Rugby League's Player of the Year award. George Rainey was elected NZRL Chairman, replacing Ron McGregor.

== National competitions ==
=== Rugby League Cup ===
Canterbury lost the Rugby League Cup to Auckland 16–14 on Queen's Birthday. 6,500 watched the match in bad weather at the Addington Showgrounds.Canterbury had earlier defeated Waikato 48-14 and Wellington 30–9.

Near the end of the season Auckland defended the cup against Canterbury, defeating them 22–8.

=== Interdistricts Series ===
The Travelseekers Interdistricts Series included Auckland, Northern Districts, Central Districts and the South Island. Auckland defeated the South Island 38–8 at Carlaw Park.

- Auckland were coached by Bob Bailey and included George Mann, Shane Horo, Darrell Williams, Marty Crequer, Joe and Tea Ropati, Mark Elia, Shane Cooper, Gary Freeman, Peter Brown, Owen Wright, Dean Lonergan, Mark Bourneville, captain Ron O'Regan, Paddy Tuimavave, George Mann, Kelly Shelford, Paul Okesene and James Goulding. David Watson, Peter Ropati, Mark Horo, Sam Panapa and Brian McClennan all played for Auckland in the district final against Canterbury.
- Northern Districts were coached by Tony Gordon and included Gary Mercer, Russell Stewart, Mark Woods and Glen Donaldson
- Central Districts included Mike Kuiti, Barry Harvey, Adrian Shelford, Sam Stewart and George Lajpold.
- The South Island were coached by Ray Heffenden and included Phil Bancroft, Esene Faimalo, Ross Taylor, Brendon Tuuta, captain Wayne Wallace, Brent Todd and Wayne Dwyer.

==== Seasons Standings ====
Team	Pld	W	L	PF	PA	Pts
Auckland	3	3	0	100	54	6
South Island	3	2	1	50	52	4
Central Districts	3	1	2	62	68	2
Northern Districts	3	0	3	54	92	0

=== National Provincial Competition ===
Canterbury defeated Bay of Plenty 16–0 to win the National Provincial Competition. They then played Auckland in a challenge match. Auckland won 22–8.

==== North Island First Division ====
- Northland achieved its first ever win in New Plymouth when it defeated Taranaki 10–9.
- Waikato were coached by Laurie Stubbing and included Tawera Nikau and Steve Rapira senior who both played for the Junior Kiwis.
- The Bay of Plenty were coached by Tony Gordon and included Gary Mercer, Mark Woods, Russell Stewart and Glenn Donaldson.
- Barry Harvey played for Taranaki. Taranaki defeated Midlands 32–18 to retain their place in the first division.

==== South Zone First Division ====
- Wellington were coached by Howie Tamati and included Tony Kemp, George Lajpold, Sonny Whakarau, Robert Piva, Adrian Shelford, Mike Kuiti and Sam Stewart. Kemp, Whakarau and Shelford had all moved into the province that season
- Canterbury were coached by Ray Haffenden and included Wayne Wallace, Barry Edkins, Brendon Tuuta, Esene Faimalo (at only 19), Ross Taylor, Phil Bancroft and Brent Todd.
- The West Coast were coached by Tony Coll and included Glen Gibb and Wayne Dwyer.

==== Second Division ====
- Manawatu included Dick Uluave and Peter Sixtus.

=== National Club Competition ===
The national club competition, called the Lion Red League Nationals for sponsorship reasons, was won by the Te Atatu Roosters who defeated the Mount Albert Lions 36–10 in the final. The final was held at Carlaw Park.

In a qualifying match, Cooks (Invercargill) defeated St Kilda (Otago) 42–28.

Round of 16
Halswell (Canterbury)	10
Omahu (H.Bay)	6
Mt Albert (Auckland)	24
Turangi (Midlands)	0
Huntly South (Waikato)	18
Kaiti (Gisborne EC)	8
Hornby (Canterbury)	56
Foxton (Manawatu)	10
Te Atatu (Auckland)	44
Portland (Northland)	4
Randwick (Wellington)	18
Runanga (W.Coast)	12
Upper Hutt (Wellington)	80
Cooks (Invercargill)	0
Pikiao (BOP)	20
Waitara (Taranaki)	12

Quarter-finals
Halswell	12
Mt Albert	26
Huntly South	4
Hornby	18
Te Atatu	24
Randwick	18
Upper Hutt	20
Pikiao	12

Semi-finals
Mt Albert	47
Hornby	26
Te Atatu	20
Upper Hutt	12

Grand Final
Mt Albert	10
Te Atatu	36

== Club competitions ==
=== Auckland ===
The Mount Albert Lions and Te Atatu Roosters dominated the club scene. Mt Albert defeated Te Atatu 31–4 in the final to give the Lions their third straight Fox Memorial. The Manukau Magpies won the Roope Rooster and the Stormont Shield. Te Atatu won the Rukutai Shield.

The Mount Albert Lions were coached by Mike McClennan and included Riki Cowan, Shane Cooper, Brian McClennan, Paddy Tuimavave, Mark Bourneville and Dominic Clark while the Te Atatu Roosters were coached by Brian Tracey and included Shane and Mark Horo, Peter Brown, Mark Elia, Sam Panapa and Ron O'Regan. The Northcote Tigers were coached by John O'Sullivan and included Gary Freeman, Kurt Sorensen and Marty Crequer and the Manukau Magpies included Paul Okesene, Mike Patton, Kelly Shelford, Owen and Nick Wright and David Watson. The Otahuhu Leopards included Tea Ropati and David Pakieto and the Mangere East Hawks included George Mann.

=== Wellington ===
The Upper Hutt Tigers defeated the Randwick Kingfishers 18–16 in the 18th minute of extra time to win the Wellington Rugby League grand final. Randwick included Sam Stewart, George Lajpold and Tony Kemp while Adrian Shelford, Mike Kuiti and Sonny Whakarau played for Upper Hutt. Robert Piva played for St. George.

=== Canterbury ===
Hornby, for the third consecutive year, played Halswell in the grand final. Hornby won 20–5.

Esene Faimalo played for Addington. Mocky Brereton was the club president of Marist-Western Suburbs. Hornby included Brendon Tuuta, Ross Taylor and Wayne Wallace. Mark Broadhurst coached Papanui.

Hornby defeated Runanga 40–20 at the Addington Show Grounds to retain the Thacker Shield.

Aranui High School won the inaugural The Press cup.

=== Other Competitions ===
Portland won the Northland Rugby League grand final, defeating Moerewa 28–20. The Te Paatu Warriors won the Far North division. Portland then defeated Te Paatu 50–6 to advance into the National Club Competition.

Huntly South defeated Taniwharau 20–11 to win the Waikato Rugby League grand final. Tapuwaeharuru won the Midlands final, defeating Pacific 18–8. Pikiao, who included Gary Mercer defeated the Ngongotaha Chiefs 18–12 in the Bay of Plenty Rugby League grand final. The Chiefs included Mark Woods and Russell Stewart. Kaiti won the Gisborne-East Coast final over Paikea.

Omahu won the Hawke's Bay Rugby League grand final, defeating Flaxmere 24–14. The Waitara Bears defeated Marist 46–0 to win the Taranaki Rugby League title. Foxton won the Manawatu Rugby League grand final, defeating Wanganui United 32–13.

Runanga won their eight consecutive West Coast Rugby League title, defeating Marist 50–22 in the grand final at Wingham Park. Runanga included Glen Gibb and Bernie Green. St Kilda won the Otago final 22–18 over Mosgiel.
