= 1985 New Zealand rugby league season =

Seasons
- 1984 1986

The 1985 New Zealand rugby league season was the 78th season of rugby league that had been played in New Zealand.

== International competitions ==
New Zealand lost a series to Australia 1–2, however the win, 18–0 at Carlaw Park, counted towards the 1988 World Cup. New Zealand were coached by Graham Lowe and included; Dean Bell, Riki Cowan, Mark Elia, Olsen Filipaina, Clayton Friend, captain Mark Graham, Gary Kemble, James Leuluai, Hugh McGahan, Dane O'Hara, Gary Prohm, Joe Ropati, Kurt Sorensen, Howie and Kevin Tamati and Owen Wright.

Australia defeated the South Island 56–0 at the Addington Showgrounds. They then recorded wins against Central Districts, 24–4, and Northern Districts, 52–6. Auckland then lost to Australia 10–50 in front of 15,000 fans at Carlaw Park.

The Kiwis then toured Great Britain and France. They drew the series with Great Britain 1-all, drawing the World Cup match, and defeated France 2–0, securing the World Cup win. Graham Lowe was the coach of the Kiwis, who included; Fred Ah Kuoi, Dean Bell, Riki Cowan, third Great Britain Test captain Olsen Filipaina, Clayton Friend, tour captain Mark Graham, Gary Kemble, James Leuluai, first French Test captain Hugh McGahan, Dane O'Hara, Gary Prohm, Dane and Kurt Sorensen, Sam Stewart, Howie and Kevin Tamati, Graeme West, Shane Cooper, Wayne Wallace, Darrell Williams, James Goulding and Owen Wright.

St. Helens toured the country, losing to Canterbury 24–30. Manukau defeated St Helens 26–10.

Mark Graham won the New Zealand Rugby League's player of the year award.

== National competitions ==
=== Rugby League Cup ===
Canterbury held the Rugby League Cup at the end of the season. Earlier in the year Taranaki defeated Wellington to capture the trophy before themselves losing it to Canterbury 22-16 who were on a North Island tour where they also defeated Waikato and Wellington. Canterbury then drew with Auckland 22-all in front of 5,000 on 21 May and the West Coast 16-all and defeated Wellington 10–4 in Rugby League Cup challenges. The West Coast was also defeated 24–12 in a non-challenge match.

Canterbury were coached by Ray Haffenden and included Barry Edkins, Robin Alfeld, Marty Crequer, Wayne Wallace, Ross Taylor, Adrian Shelford, Brent Todd, Phil Bancroft and captain David Field.

=== Inter-district competition ===
Auckland won the Inter-Districts competition on count back after they drew 12-all with the South Island at Wingham Park.

Auckland were coached by Bob Bailey and included Mark Elia, Joe Ropati, Nick Wright, Mark Bourneville, Darrell Williams, Paddy Tuimavave, captain Ron O'Regan, Kelly Shelford, Ricky Cowan, Frank Tinitelia, James Goulding, Dean Lonergan, Ian Bell and Sam Panapa.

The South Island included Robin Alfeld, Marty Crequer, David Field, Glen Gibb, Wayne Wallace, Ross Taylor, Adrian Shelford, Brent Stuart and Barry Edkins.

=== National Club competition ===
Manukau won the Tusk Cup, defeating Randwick 34–13 to claim the $15,000 prize. It was the third consecutive final Randwick had lost. Manukau had defeated defending champions Mount Albert 24–10 in a semifinal.

== Australasian competition ==
Auckland were eliminated in Round one of the National Panasonic Cup when they lost 32–10 to the Western Suburbs Magpies at Leichhardt Oval.

== Club competitions ==
=== Auckland ===
Mt Albert won the Auckland Rugby League's Fox Memorial Trophy and the Stormont Shield. They defeated Manukau 24–19 in the Fox Memorial Grand Final. Manukau won the Rukutai Shield, Roope Rooster and Kiwi Shield. Glenora won the Sharman Cup and Lawson Cup in division two while Richmond won division three's Norton Cup.

Dean Lonergan (City-Newton) won the Best and Fairest award. Michael Patton won the Lipscombe Cup for Mangere East, Shane Cooper won the Rothville Trophy, James Goulding (forward) from Richmond and Kelly Shelford (back) from Manukau won the Bert Humphries Memorial Medals. Joe Ropati from Otahuhu won the Tetley Trophy, Kevin Hughes from Te Atatu won the Painter Rosebowl Trophy and Cameron Bell won the Hyland Memorial Cup for Manukau as coach of the year.

Mark Bourneville and Paddy Tuimavave played for Mount Albert while Manukau were coached by Cameron Bell and included Paul and Hitro Okesene, Dean and Ian Bell, Clayton Friend and Nick Wright.

=== Wellington ===
Randwick won the Wellington Rugby League's Appleton Shield.

=== Canterbury ===
Halswell won the Canterbury Rugby League's Pat Smith Challenge Trophy in its 25th season.

Marty Crequer and Adrian Shelford played for Hornby while Phil Bancroft played for Halswell.

=== Other Competitions ===
The Waitara Bears defeated Western Suburbs 50–12 in the Taranaki Rugby League grand final.
