= 1985 Kangaroo tour of New Zealand =

1985 rugby league tour

The 1985 Kangaroo Tour of New Zealand was a mid-season tour of New Zealand by the Australia national rugby league team. The Australians played six matches on tour, including the final two games of a three-game test series against the Graham Lowe coached, Mark Graham captained New Zealand Kiwis, with the first test taking place at Lang Park in Brisbane on 18 June. The New Zealand tour began on 19 June and finished on 10 July.

== Squad and Leadership ==
After long time coach Frank Stanton stepped down from representative coaching duties after Australia's successful defence of The Ashes in 1984 against the touring Great Britain Lions, the Australian Rugby League re-appointed 1977 Rugby League World Cup Final winning coach and former Parramatta Eels coach Terry Fearnley as head coach of the Kangaroos. The team was captained by Queensland captain Wally Lewis who had captained the team since the 1984 Ashes series. Balmain's New South Wales captain-in waiting Wayne Pearce was chosen as the team vice-captain after Blues captain Steve Mortimer announced his retirement from representative football and declined to tour.

The team consisted of 19 players, 13 of them from the Winfield Cup with all being from New South Wales except for red-headed Manly-Warringah back rower Paul Vautin who was the only Queensland player selected from the Sydney Premiership. 5 of the 6 Queensland based players were drawn from the Brisbane Rugby League competition with only hooker Greg Conescu picked from country Queensland as he was playing for Past Brothers in Gladstone.

== Controversy ==
While he was named Australian coach, Terry Fearnley had also been appointed as New South Wales State of Origin coach in 1985. After losing the single Origin games played in 1980 and 1981, as well as the 1982, 1983 and 1984 Origin series, the once dominant Blues won their first ever Origin series in 1985 after winning games 1 and 2. In what was to prove a case of bad planning, the test series and the tour of NZ were scheduled to take place between games 2 and 3 of the Origin series.

Rumours soon surfaced that Fearnley and Lewis did not get along on tour. Lewis later confirmed this by admitting in television interviews that the pair hated each other while Fearnley openly admitted that in light of the circumstances he could have done a better job in bringing the team together (Steve Mortimer, who had formed a close friendship with Lewis since they first teamed together in the Australian halves in 1981 and were room mates on the 1982 Kangaroo tour, later also said that he regretted his decision not to tour as he believed his relationships with both of them could have acted as a bridge and eased the tension). Wally Lewis also publicly stated that he believed Fearnley openly favoured vice-captain Wayne Pearce, as well as the rest of the Kangaroos who were from his NSW team. At one point before the third test in Auckland, Lewis claimed to have caught Fearnley and Pearce going over team selection in Fearnley's hotel room, something strongly denied by the pair.

Fearnley himself created controversy on the tour. In the book King Wally which was published in 1987, Wally Lewis claimed that Fearnley had said of team member Michael O'Connor, a NSW player, "Can't play, no heart. Lucky he can kick goals or he wouldn't be here" (a former Wallabies rugby union international, O'Connor was the only player not to play a test on the tour). The publishing of this story led to some animosity over the coming years between Lewis and O'Connor despite them being regular Test team mates until the end of 1989. But the biggest controversy came from the team selection for the third test. Fearnley dropped five players from the second test win, four of them Queenslanders (Chris Close, Mark Murray, Greg Dowling and Greg Conescu - Close and Dowling dropped to the bench. Noel Cleal who played from the bench in the 2nd Test was the only NSW player dropped), which caused all hell to break loose and prompted Queensland Rugby League Chairman, Federal Senator Ron McAuliffe, to publicly condemn the dropping of the four Queensland players from a winning Test side, saying "Its a football assassination and beyond all reasoning. And there can be no reasonable excuse for it".

With the replacement players in place (Steve Ella, Des Hasler, Peter Tunks and Benny Elias), the disjointed Kangaroos would go on to lose the third test 18–0, the first time they had been held scoreless since losing 19–0 to Great Britain in the 3rd Ashes series Test of the 1956–57 Kangaroo tour. Such was the animosity in the group between the NSW and Qld players that according to second row forward Paul "Fatty" Vautin (one of 4 Queensland players who retained their spot in the starting XIII) in his book Fatty: The Strife and Times of Paul Vautin, two of the dropped players Mark Murray and Greg Conescu, acted as the Australian teams statisticians for the game and that both recorded a number of errors that were actually made by team mates to the players who directly replaced them in the side, Hasler and Elias.

Terry Fearnley stepped down as Australian coach following the tour. He would be replaced in 1986 by 1956–57 Kangaroo tourist and Canberra Raiders head coach Don Furner.

As a result of the problems during the tour, the Australian Rugby League made a number of decisions for future Australian teams, including:

- No current State of Origin coach can also be the current Australian coach.
- Mid-season Test series or single Tests will only take place before or after the Origin series and not during one to avoid bringing the NSW vs Qld rivalry into the Australian team.

== Touring squad ==
* Tests and (as sub) not included in games totals.
* Table includes Brisbane Test.

Player	Club	Position(s)	Games (as sub)	Tests (as sub)	Tries	Goals	F/Goals	Points
Noel Cleal	Manly Warringah Sea Eagles	Second-row	3	1 (1)	5	0	0	20
Chris Close	Manly Warringah Sea Eagles	Centre	2	2 (1)	2	0	0	8
Greg Conescu	Past Brothers Gladstone (Qld)	Hooker	2	2	0	0	0	0
Greg Dowling	Wynnum Manly Seagulls (Qld)	Prop	2	2 (1)	0	0	0	0
Benny Elias	Balmain Tigers	Hooker	2 (1)	1	0	0	0	0
Steve Ella	Parramatta Eels	Fullback, Centre, Five-eighth	3	1 (1)	2	0	0	8
John Ferguson	Eastern Suburbs Roosters	Wing	3	3	2	0	0	8
Des Hasler	Manly-Warringah Sea Eagles	Halfback, Wing	3	1	5	0	0	20
Garry Jack	Balmain Tigers	Fullback	2 (2)	3	4	0	0	16
Wally Lewis (c)	Wynnum Manly Seagulls (Qld)	Five-eighth	2	3	1	0	0	4
Mal Meninga	Souths Magpies (Qld)	Centre	2	3	3	11	0	34
Mark Murray	Redcliffe Dolphins (Qld)	Halfback	2 (1)	2	0	0	0	0
Michael O'Connor	St George Dragons	Centre, Fullback	4	–	3	13	0	38
Wayne Pearce (vc)	Balmain Tigers	Lock	3	3	0	0	0	0
John Ribot	Redcliffe Dolphins (Qld)	Wing	4	3	6	3	0	24
Steve Roach	Balmain Tigers	Prop	2 (1)	3	0	0	0	0
Peter Tunks	Canterbury-Bankstown Bulldogs	Prop	4	1 (1)	0	0	0	0
Paul Vautin	Manly-Warringah Sea Eagles	Second-row	1	2	0	0	0	0
Peter Wynn	Parramatta Eels	Second-row, Lock	1	3	0	0	0	0

== Tour ==
=== First test ===
Immediately prior to the tour, the first test took place at Lang Park in Brisbane on 18 June. This match is most remembered for the sideline fight between rival prop forwards Greg Dowling and Kevin Tamati after the pair had been sent to the sin-bin for fighting.

Tuesday, 18 June

Australia	26 – 20	New Zealand
Tries: 5 John Ribot (2); Noel Cleal; Chris Close; Steve Roach; Goals: 3 Mal Meninga (2/6); John Ribot (1/1)		Tries: 3 Dean Bell; Olsen Filipaina; Hugh McGahan; Goals: 4 Olsen Filipaina (4)

Lang Park, Brisbane
Attendance: 22,000
Referee: Julien Rascagnères (France)
Player of the Match: Olsen Filipaina

Australia	New Zealand

FB	1	Garry Jack
LW	2	John Ribot
CE	3	Chris Close
CE	4	Mal Meninga
RW	5	John Ferguson
FE	6	Wally Lewis (c)
HB	7	Mark Murray
PR	8	Greg Dowling
HK	9	Greg Conescu
PR	10	Steve Roach
SR	11	Noel Cleal
SR	12	Peter Wynn
LF	13	Wayne Pearce
Substitutions:
IC	14	Steve Ella
IC	15	Peter Tunks
Coach:
(Australia) Terry Fearnley

FB	1	Gary Kemble
LW	2	Dean Bell
CE	3	Gary Prohm
CE	4	James Leuluai
RW	5	Dane O'Hara
FE	6	Olsen Filipaina
HB	7	Clayton Friend
PR	8	Owen Wright
HK	9	Howie Tamati
PR	10	Kevin Tamati
SR	11	Kurt Sorensen
SR	12	Mark Graham (c)
LK	13	Hugh McGahan
Substitutions:
IC	14	Riki Cowan
IC	15	Mark Elia
Coach:
(New Zealand) Graham Lowe

The Australians played six games on the tour, winning five.

Sunday 23 June

South Island	0 – 56	Australia
Tries: Goals:	Report	Tries: Mal Meninga (3), Des Hasler (2), John Ribot (2), John Ferguson, Garry Jack, Wally Lewis, Michael O'Connor; Goals: Mal Meninga (6/11)

Addington Showgrounds, Christchurch
Attendance: 5,000
Referee: Don Wilson (New Zealand)
Player of the Match: Mal Meninga

South Island: Robin Alfeld, Mike Kerrigan, Bill Baker, Lance Setu, Marty Crequer, David Field (c), Glen Gibb, Paul Truscott, Wayne Wallace, Ross Taylor, Adrian Shelford, Brent Stuart, Barry Edkins. Reserves – Boyd Kilkelly, David Campbell. Coach – Ray Haffenden

Australia: Steve Ella, John Ferguson, Michael O'Connor, Mal Meninga, John Ribot, Wally Lewis (c), Des Hasler, Steve Roach, Benny Elias, Peter Tunks, Wally Fullerton Smith, Noel Cleal, Peter Wynn. Reserves – Garry Jack, Greg Conescu

Wednesday, 26 June

Central Districts	4 – 24	Australia
Tries: John Gray; Goals:	Report	Tries: Chris Close, John Ferguson, Des Hasler; Goals: Mal Meninga (1); Michael O'Connor (1)

Hutt Recreation Ground, Wellington
Attendance: 5,500
Referee: Tony Drake

Central Districts: Vaun O'Callaghan, Bill Baker, Ben Mathews, Kelly Shelford, John Gray, Gerard Katene, Phil Bancroft, Glen Bell, James Goulding, Barry Harvey, Sam Stewart, Mike Kuiti, Phillip Henry. Reserves – Gary Freeman, Dave MacFarlane. Coach – John O'Sullivan

Australia: Michael O'Connor, John Ferguson, Chris Close, Mal Meninga, John Ribot, Mark Murray, Des Hasler, Steve Roach, Greg Conescu, Peter Tunks, Wally Fullerton Smith, Paul Vautin, Wayne Pearce (c). Reserves – Garry Jack, Benny Elias

=== Second test ===
The Australians escaped with a 10-6 win over New Zealand thanks to a last minute try to winger John Ribot.

Sunday, 30 June

New Zealand	6 – 10	Australia
Tries: James Leuluai; Goals: Olsen Filipaina (1)		Tries: John Ribot; Goals: Mal Meninga (2); John Ribot (1)

Carlaw Park, Auckland
Attendance: 19,132
Referee: Julien Rascagnères (France)
Player of the Match: Olsen Filipaina

New Zealand	Australia

FB	1	Gary Kemble
LW	2	Dean Bell
CE	3	Gary Prohm
CE	4	James Leuluai
RW	5	Dane O'Hara
FE	6	Olsen Filipaina
HB	7	Clayton Friend
PR	8	Owen Wright
HK	9	Howie Tamati
PR	10	Kevin Tamati
SR	11	Kurt Sorensen
SR	12	Mark Graham (c)
LK	13	Hugh McGahan
Substitutions:
IC	14	Joe Ropati
IC	15	Riki Cowan
Coach:
(New Zealand) Graham Lowe

FB	1	Garry Jack
LW	2	John Ribot
CE	3	Chris Close
CE	4	Mal Meninga
RW	5	John Ferguson
FE	6	Wally Lewis (c)
HB	7	Mark Murray
PR	8	Greg Dowling
HK	9	Greg Conescu
PR	10	Steve Roach
SR	11	Paul Vautin
SR	12	Peter Wynn
LF	13	Wayne Pearce
Substitutions:
IC	14	Noel Cleal
IC	15	Steve Ella
Coach:
(Australia) Terry Fearnley

Wednesday, 3 July

Northern Districts	6 – 52	Australia
Tries: Shane Horo; Goals: Rusty Campbell (1)	Report	Tries: Noel Cleal (2), Steve Ella (2), Garry Jack (2), Benny Elias, Wally Fullerton Smith, Des Hasler, Michael O'Connor, John Ribot; Goals: Michael O'Connor (3/8); John Ribot (1/2)

Okara Park, Whangārei
Attendance: 1,500
Referee: Ray Shrimpton
Player of the Match: Peter Tunks

Northern Districts: George Huriwai, Terry Rapana, Walter Toka, Pihama Green, Shane Horo, Russell Stewart, Glenn Donaldson, Tom Murray, Trevor Clark, Darren Harris, Mark Horo, Rusty Campbell, Neville Ramsey. Reserves – Poko Daniels, Derek Nukunuka. Coach – Tony Gordon

Australia: Garry Jack, John Ribot, Michael O'Connor, Steve Ella, John Ferguson, Wally Lewis (c), Des Hasler, Greg Dowling, Benny Elias, Peter Tunks, Noel Cleal, Wally Fullerton Smith, Wayne Pearce. Reserves – Mark Murray, Steve Roach

=== Third test ===
The dead rubber third test also doubled as the first game of the 1985–1988 Rugby League World Cup tournament. John Ribot, Steve Ella, John Ferguson, Peter Wynn and Chris Close played their last tests for Australia.

Sunday, 7 July

New Zealand	18 – 0	Australia
Tries: Clayton Friend (2); James Leuluai; Goals: Olsen Filipaina (3/4)		Tries: Goals:

Carlaw Park, Auckland
Attendance: 15,327
Referee: Julien Rascagnères (France)
Player of the Match: Clayton Friend

New Zealand	Australia

FB	1	Gary Kemble
LW	2	Dean Bell
CE	3	Gary Prohm
CE	4	James Leuluai
RW	5	Dane O'Hara
FE	6	Olsen Filipaina
HB	7	Clayton Friend
PR	8	Owen Wright
HK	9	Howie Tamati
PR	10	Kevin Tamati
SR	11	Kurt Sorensen
SR	12	Mark Graham (c)
LK	13	Hugh McGahan
Substitutions:
IC	14	Joe Ropati
IC	15	Riki Cowan
Coach:
(New Zealand) Graham Lowe

FB	1	Garry Jack
LW	2	John Ribot
CE	3	Mal Meninga
CE	4	Steve Ella
RW	5	John Ferguson
FE	6	Wally Lewis (c)
HB	7	Des Hasler
PR	8	Peter Tunks
HK	9	Benny Elias
PR	10	Steve Roach
SR	11	Paul Vautin
SR	12	Peter Wynn
LF	13	Wayne Pearce
Substitutions:
IC	14	Chris Close
IC	15	Greg Dowling
Coach:
(Australia) Terry Fearnley

Tuesday, 9 July

Auckland	10 – 50	Australia
Tries: Mark Bourneville, Dennis Stewart; Goals: Nick Wright (1)	Report	Tries: Chris Close (3), Noel Cleal (2), Des Hasler, Garry Jack, Michael O'Connor; Goals: Michael O'Connor (9/11)

Carlaw Park, Auckland
Attendance: 18,000
Referee: Dennis Hale

Auckland: Nick Wright, Mark Bourneville, Darrell Williams, Ron O'Regan, Mark Elia, Kelly Shelford, Sam Panapa, Riki Cowan, Tracey McGregor, Frank Tinitelia, James Goulding, Dennis Stewart, Ian Bell. Reserves – . Coach – Bob Bailey

Australia: Garry Jack, Des Hasler, Chris Close, Michael O'Connor, John Ribot, Steve Ella, Mark Murray, Peter Tunks, Greg Conescu, Greg Dowling, Wally Fullerton Smith, Noel Cleal, Wayne Pearce (c). Reserves –

== Statistics ==
* stats only for games played in New Zealand. First Test in Brisbane not included here.
Leading Try Scorer

- 5 by Des Hasler

Leading Point Scorer

- 38 by Michael O'Connor (3 tries, 13 goals)

Largest Test Attendance

- 19,132 – Second test vs New Zealand at Carlaw Park

Largest non-test Attendance

- 18,000 – Australia vs Auckland at Carlaw Park
