= 1984 New Zealand rugby league season =

Seasons
- ← 1983 1985 →

The 1984 New Zealand rugby league season was the 77th season of rugby league that had been played in New Zealand. The main feature of the year was the Interdistricts Series competition that was run by the New Zealand Rugby League. Auckland won the series, defeating the other three inter-district teams.

== International competitions ==
The Great Britain side toured New Zealand in July. They opened the tour by defeating Northern Districts, who featured Russell Stewart before losing the first Test match against the New Zealand national rugby league team 0–12. They then defeated the New Zealand Māori side 19–8 and Central Districts, who included Sam Stewart, 38–6 before losing the second Test match, and the series, 12–28. They defeated the South Island 36–14 before losing the third and final Test match 16–32. The South Island side included Glen Gibb, Robin Alfeld, Marty Crequer, David Field, Wayne Dwyer, Wayne Wallace, Ross Taylor, Barry Edkins and Adrian Shelford. The tour finished with a match against Auckland, which they lost 16–18 in front of 7,000 fans at Carlaw Park. Auckland were coached by Bob Bailey and included; Darrell Williams, Cedric Lovett, Dean Bell, captain Ron O'Regan, Joe Ropati, Shane Cooper, Clayton Friend, Kevin Tamati, Lindsay Hooker, Ricky Cowan, John Ackland, Steve Howells and Owen Wright. Bench: Afi Ah Kuoi and John Zwart.

Before the tour a Kiwis trial match was held with the sides being coached by Mike McClennan and John O'Sullivan. The Kiwis were coached by Graham Lowe and for all three tests the side was: Gary Kemble, Dane O'Hara, James Leuluai, Fred Ah Kuoi, Dean Bell, Olsen Filipaina, Shane Varley, Kevin Tamati, Howard Tamati, Dane Sorensen, Owen Wright, Kurt Sorensen, Hugh McGahan. Bench: Clayton Friend and Riki Cowan.

In June, before the Great Britain tour, a home based New Zealand side lost to Queensland 18–14 in Brisbane. The side for the Brisbane match was: Nick Wright, Joe Ropati, Dean Bell, Ron O'Regan, Marty Crequer, David Field, Clayton Friend, Riki Cowan, Wayne Wallace, Vern Wilson, Owen Wright, Russell Tuuta, Hugh McGahan. Bench: Robin Alfeld and Chappie Pine.

A Queensland Country side had earlier toured the country in May–June, the side defeated the South Island and Northern Districts but lost to Auckland 2–28. Auckland had earlier lost a Panasonic Cup match 18–25 to Queensland Country to be eliminated from the tournament.

A New Zealand Universities side toured Great Britain and France, defeating English University Students 24–4 but losing to French Universities 8–0.

During the season a match between Europe and Oceania was held in France to celebrate the French Rugby League's 50th year. Graham Lowe was appointed the Oceania coach with Robin Alfeld, Dean Bell, Howie Tamati, Kevin Tamati, Mark Graham, Shane Varley and Hugh McGahan all invited to play in the side.

Kevin Tamati won the New Zealand Rugby League's Player of the Year award.

== National competitions ==
=== Rugby League Cup ===
Wellington defended the Rugby League Cup with Taranaki being their only challenger. Wellington defeated Taranaki 30–12 at Rugby League Park in Wellington with Mike Kuiti, Sam Stewart and George Lajpold representing Wellington.

=== Interdistricts Series ===
The Travelseekers Interdistricts Series included Auckland, Northern Districts, Central Districts and the South Island. Auckland defeated the South Island 22–18.

- Auckland were coached by Bob Bailey and included Mark Bournville, John Ackland, Hugh McGahan, Riki Cowan, Dean Bell, captain Ron O'Regan, Shane Cooper, Owen Wright, Joe Ropati, Clayton Friend and Darrell Williams.
- Northern Districts included Russell Stewart, Anthony Murray, Bill Kells and Mark Horo.
- Central Districts were coached by Allan Marshall and included Sam Stewart, Whare Henry, Mike Kuiti and Barry Harvey.
- The South Island included David Field, Glen Gibb, Wayne Dwyer, Ross Taylor, Marty Crequer and Wayne Wallace.

==== Seasons Standings ====
Team	Pld	W	L	PF	PA	Pts
Auckland	3	3	0	72	30	6
South Island	3	2	1	77	42	4
Central Districts	3	1	2	48	63	2
Northern Districts	3	0	3	40	102	0

=== National Provincial Competition ===
A final between Canterbury and Waikato was not played as no suitable date could be found.

==== North Island First Division ====
- Northland included Shane Horo and Anthony Murray.
- Waikato won the division. The side included Bill Kells and Mark Horo.
- Taranaki included Barry Harvey.

Team	Pld	W	L	PF	PA	Pts
Waikato	6	4	2	171	101	8
Northland	6	3	3	108	118	6
Taranaki	6	3	3	108	142	6
Midlands	6	2	4	113	118	4

==== Southern Zone First Division ====
- Canterbury included Adrian Shelford, Marty Crequer, Wayne Wallace, Phil Bancroft, captain David Field and Ross Taylor.
- Wellington withdrew from the competition.
- West Coast included Glen Gibb, Brent Stuart and Wayne Dwyer.

Team	Pld	W	L	PF	PA	Pts
Canterbury	2	2	0	80	28	4
West Coast	2	0	2	28	80	0

==== North Island Second Division ====
- The Bay of Plenty were coached by Tony Gordon. During the season they also defeated Northland and the West Coast. The side included Russell Stewart and Mark Woods.

Team	Pld	W	L	PF	PA	Pts
Bay of Plenty	3	3	0	104	58	6
Hawkes Bay	3	1	2	76	44	2
Gisborne-East Coast	3	1	2	83	102	2
Manawatu	3	1	2	31	90	2

==== South Island Second Division ====
This was the last time a combined Otago-Southland would play until 1998, with the districts splitting after the 1984 season.

Semifinal		Final
		Canterbury B	54
Canterbury B	40	West Coast B	10
Otago-Southland	0

=== National Club Competition ===
The national club competition, called the Tusk Cup for sponsorship reasons, was won by the Mt Albert Lions who defeated the Randwick Kingfishers 24–10 in the final. The final was held at Carlaw Park.

Round of 16
Hornby (Canterbury)	12
Marist-Northern (Wellington)	6
Mt Albert (Auckland)	104
AML (Gisborne)	4
Otahuhu (Auckland)	58
Portland (Northland)	4
Taniwharau (Waikato)	18
Waitara (Taranaki)	4
Mangakino (Midlands)	24
Central (BOP)	8
Omahu (H.Bay)	33
He Tauaa (O-Sth)	8
Randwick (Wellington)	30
Runanga (Wst.C)	10
Halswell (Canterbury)	36
Wanganui (Manawatu)	14

Quarter-finals
Hornby	4
Mt Albert	8
Otahuhu	20
Taniwharau	12
Mangakino	16
Omahu	22
Randwick	18
Halswell	6

Semi-finals
Mt Albert	26
Otahuhu	16
Omahu	20
Randwick	46

Grand Final
Mt Albert	24
Randwick	10

== Club competitions ==
=== Auckland ===
Mount Albert defeated minor premiers Otahuhu 25–6 in the Fox Memorial grand final. City-Newton won the Sharman Cup. The pre season tournament was won by Manukau. Mt Albert won the Roope Rooster, played as a mid-week knock out competition.

Otahuhu were then defeated 32–13 by the touring Wynnum Manly Seagulls.

- Mount Albert, coached by Mike McClennan included Mark Bourneville, Darrell Williams, John Ackland, Riki Cowan and captain Shane Cooper.
- Otahuhu included Owen Wright, Joe and Tea Ropati and Hugh McGahan.
- Manukau included Ian and Dean Bell and Clayton Friend.
- Te Atatu included Ron O'Regan.

=== Wellington ===
The Randwick Kingfishers defended their Wellington Rugby League title, defeating Marist-Northern 28–14 in the Grand Final. Randwick included Sam Stewart, Kevin Tamati and George Lajpold. Mike Kuiti played for Upper Hutt.

Sam Stewart won the Best and Fairest award.

=== Canterbury ===
Hornby, who included Marty Crequer, Ross Taylor, Wayne Wallace and Adrian Shelford, defended their Canterbury Rugby League title. They defeated Halswell 22–12 in the grand final.

Hornby then defeated Runanga 50–12 to retain the Thacker Shield for Canterbury.

Adrian Shelford was the CRL's Sportsman of the Year.

Hornby High School won the High School grand final.

=== Waikato ===
Taniwharau won the Waikato Rugby League grand final, in the first year of the competition since the Waikato and Hamilton districts amalgamated. Taniwharau, who included Rick Muru, defeated the Hamilton City Tigers 15–8.

=== Other Competitions ===
Piako won the Bay of Plenty Rugby League competition, defeating Central 22–14 in the grand final. Minor premiers Central were coached by Tony Gordon.

The Waitara Bears, led by Howie Tamati, won the Taranaki Rugby League grand final, defeating Western Suburbs 8–2.

The Omahu Huias won the Hawkes Bay Rugby League competition by defeating He Tauaa 30–18.

Runanga won their sixth consecutive West Coast Rugby League championship.

A six team competition was played in Otago-Southland.
