= 1986 New Zealand rugby league tour of Australia and Papua New Guinea =

International rugby league tour

The 1986 New Zealand rugby league tour of Australia and Papua New Guinea was a tour by the New Zealand national rugby league team. Test matches were played in New Zealand, Australia and Papua New Guinea. The tour began on 6 July in Auckland and finished on 17 August in Port Moresby, consisted of five test matches, with two of them counting towards the 1985-88 World Cup.

After having lost 18–0 to the Kiwis at Carlaw Park in the 3rd test of the 1985 series, Australia won the 1986 series 3–0. New Zealand then continued their tour to Papua New Guinea. In Papua New Guinea they won the first test against Papua New Guinea 36–26. They then lost the second test match 22–24, a match which counted towards the 1988 World Cup.

== Squads ==
=== Australia ===
Australia was coached for the first time by 1956–57 Kangaroo Tourist Don Furner. Wally Lewis was the captain of the team with Wayne Pearce the team vice captain.

The players used by Australia in the series was: Wally Lewis (Wynnum Manly) (c), Wayne Pearce (Balmain) (vc), Noel Cleal (Manly Warringah), Steve Folkes (Canterbury-Bankstown), Garry Jack (Balmain), Brett Kenny (Parramatta), Les Kiss (North Sydney), Terry Lamb (Canterbury-Bankstown), Gene Miles (Wynnum Manly), Bryan Niebling (Redcliffe), Michael O'Connor (St George), Steve Roach (Balmain), Dale Shearer (Manly-Warringah), Royce Simmons (Penrith), Peter Sterling (Pattamatta), Peter Tunks (Canterbury-Bankstown).

Of the players used by Australia, only Wayne Pearce (injury) and Peter Tunks (personal reasons) did not go on the end of season 1986 Kangaroo Tour of Great Britain and France.

=== New Zealand ===
The New Zealand test team was coached by Graham Lowe and captained by Mark Graham.

The Kiwis squad was: Mark Graham (North Sydney) (c), Dean Bell (Eastern Suburbs), Shane Cooper (Mt Albert), Mark Elia (Te Atatu), Olsen Filipaina (North Sydney), Gary Freeman (Northcote), Barry Harvey (Western Suburbs (Taranaki)), Gary Kemble (Hull), A'au Leulaui (Hull), Hugh McGahan (Eastern Suburbs), Dane O'Hara (Hull), Ron O'Regan (Mt Albert), Gary Prohm (Hull Kingston Rovers), Joe Ropati (Warrington), Kurt Sorensen (Widnes), Brent Todd (Linwood), Wayne Wallace (Hornby), Darrell Williams (Mt Albert), Owen Wright (Manukau).

Peter Brown, Tea Ropati, Marty Crequer, Dean Lonergan, Adrian Shelford, Sam Stewart, James Goulding, Glenn Donaldson and Gary Mercer also played for the Kiwis against Papua New Guinea.

== New Zealand leg ==
The tour began with Australia coming to Auckland to play the first of three test matches between the trans-Tasman rivals.

This would be the 18th and final test played between New Zealand and Australia at the Carlaw Park ground in Auckland. Due to sponsorship, the test series was known as the "Winfield Test Series".

With the selection of goal kicking St George and NSW outside back Michael O'Connor, the former Wallaby became Australia's 39th dual-code rugby international. Dale Shearer, Steve Folkes and utility reserve Terry Lamb also played in their debut tests for Australia.

=== First test ===
6 July 1986

New Zealand	8 – 22	Australia
Tries: Dean Bell Goals: Olsen Filipaina (2/2)		Tries: Brett Kenny (2); Steve Folkes; Dale Shearer; Goals: Michael O'Connor (3/5)

Carlaw Park, Auckland
Attendance: 14,566
Referee: Robin Whitfield (England)

New Zealand	Australia

FB	1	Darrell Williams
LW	2	Joe Ropati
CE	3	Dean Bell
CE	4	James Leuluai
RW	5	Dane O'Hara
FE	6	Olsen Filipaina
HB	7	Shane Cooper
PR	8	Owen Wright
HK	9	Wayne Wallace
PR	10	Kurt Sorensen
SR	11	Mark Graham (c)
SR	12	Hugh McGahan
LK	13	Gary Prohm
Substitutions:
IC	14	Ron O'Regan
IC	15	Mark Elia
Coach:
(New Zealand) Graham Lowe

FB	1	Garry Jack
LW	2	Michael O'Connor
CE	3	Brett Kenny
CE	4	Gene Miles
RW	5	Dale Shearer
FE	6	Wally Lewis (c)
HB	7	Peter Sterling
PR	8	Steve Roach
HK	9	Royce Simmons
PR	10	Peter Tunks
SR	11	Noel Cleal
SR	12	Steve Folkes
LF	13	Wayne Pearce
Substitutions:
IC	14	Terry Lamb
IC	15	Bryan Niebling
Coach:
(Australia) Don Furner

== Australian leg ==
In the tour games the Kiwis defeated Newcastle 22–17, Riverina 14–16, Wide Bay 32-7 and North Queensland 46–6.

=== Second test ===
After having been Sydney's main test match venue since 1914, this would be the 69th and final test played at the Sydney Cricket Ground until 2008. Gary Freeman, who would go on to play a total of 46 tests for New Zealand until 1995, made his test debut in this game while for Australia, North Sydney and Queensland winger Les Kiss made his test debut replacing an injured Dale Shearer.

19 July 1986

Australia	29 – 12	New Zealand
Tries: Garry Jack; Brett Kenny; Wally Lewis; Gene Miles; Wayne Pearce; Goals: Michael O'Connor (4); Field Goals: Peter Sterling		Tries: Olsen Filipaina; Dane O'Hara Goals: Olsen Filipaina (2)

Sydney Cricket Ground, Sydney
Attendance: 34,302
Referee: Robin Whitfield (England)
Player of the Match: Steve Roach

Australia	New Zealand

FB	1	Garry Jack
RW	2	Les Kiss
CE	3	Brett Kenny
CE	4	Gene Miles
LW	5	Michael O'Connor
FE	6	Wally Lewis (c)
HB	7	Peter Sterling
PR	8	Steve Roach
HK	9	Royce Simmons
PR	10	Peter Tunks
SR	11	Noel Cleal
SR	12	Steve Folkes
LF	13	Wayne Pearce
Substitutions:
IC	14	Bryan Niebling
IC	15	Terry Lamb
Coach:
(Australia) Don Furner

FB	1	Gary Kemble
LW	2	Dean Bell
CE	3	Joe Ropati
CE	4	Mark Elia
RW	5	Dane O'Hara
FE	6	Olsen Filipaina
HB	7	Gary Freeman
PR	8	Owen Wright
HK	9	Barry Harvey
PR	10	Kurt Sorensen
SR	11	Mark Graham (c)
SR	12	Hugh McGahan
LK	13	Gary Prohm
Substitutions:
IC	14	Shane Cooper
IC	15	Ron O'Regan
Coach:
(New Zealand) Graham Lowe

=== Third test ===
Australian vice-captain Wayne Pearce tore the Anterior cruciate ligament in his left knee during the first half. Despite surgery and an intense rehabilitation, he was eventually ruled out of the 1986 Kangaroo Tour after failing a team medical.

Australia continued its international dominance and scored a clean sweep against the Kiwis with a 32–12, 6 tries to 2 win in front of almost 23,000 at Lang Park. The match was broadcast into NSW and Qld by the Nine Network and via relay into New Zealand. This game also counted towards the 1985-1988 Rugby League World Cup.

29 July 1986

Australia	32 – 12	New Zealand
Tries: Brett Kenny (2); Peter Sterling; Wally Lewis; Gene Miles; Michael O'Connor; Goals: Michael O'Connor (4/6)		Tries: Darrell Williams (2) Goals: Olsen Filipaina (2/3)

Lang Park, Brisbane
Attendance: 22,811
Referee: Robin Whitfield (England)
Player of the Match: Wally Lewis

Australia	New Zealand

FB	1	Garry Jack
RW	2	Les Kiss
CE	3	Gene Miles
CE	4	Brett Kenny
LW	5	Michael O'Connor
FE	6	Wally Lewis (c)
HB	7	Peter Sterling
PR	8	Steve Roach
HK	9	Royce Simmons
PR	10	Peter Tunks
SR	11	Noel Cleal
SR	12	Steve Folkes
LF	13	Wayne Pearce
Substitutions:
IC	14	Bryan Niebling
IC	15	Terry Lamb
Coach:
(Australia) Don Furner

FB	1	Gary Kemble
LW	2	Darrell Williams
CE	3	Joe Ropati
CE	4	Gary Prohm
RW	5	Dane O'Hara
FE	6	Olsen Filipaina
HB	7	Gary Freeman
PR	8	Brent Todd
HK	9	Barry Harvey
PR	10	Kurt Sorensen
SR	11	Hugh McGahan
SR	12	Mark Graham (c)
LK	13	Ron O'Regan
Substitutions:
IC	14	Shane Cooper
IC	15	Owen Wright
Coach:
(New Zealand) Graham Lowe

== Papua New Guinea leg ==
In Papua New Guinea they defeated Island Zone 26-6 and lost to Southern Zone 20-26 before the two test matches.

=== First test ===
10 August 1986

Papua New Guinea	26 – 36	New Zealand
Tries: Lauta Atoi; Darius Haili; Joe Tep; Bernard Waketsi Goals: Kungas Kuveu (5)		Tries: Peter Brown (2); Mark Elia; Gary Freeman; Hugh McGahan; Dane O'Hara; Joe Ropati; Goals: Joe Ropati (3); Peter Brown (1)

Danny Leahy Oval, Goroka
Attendance: 11,000
Referee: Kevin Roberts (Australia)
Player of the Match: Adrian Shelford

Papua New Guinea	New Zealand

FB	1	Kungas Kuveu
RW	2	Joe Katsir
CE	3	Lauta Atoi (c)
CE	4	Bal Numapo
LW	5	Arnold Tivelit
FE	6	Darius Haili
HB	7	Gessau Gebob
PR	8	Joe Tep
HK	9	Roy Heni
PR	10	Bobby Ako
SR	11	Roy Loitive
SR	12	Bernard Waketsi
LF	13	Arebo Taumaku
Substitutions:
IC	14	Dairi Kovae
IC	15	Peter Peng
Coach:
(New Zealand) Barry Wilson

FB	1	Gary Kemble
LW	2	Joe Ropati
CE	3	Darrell Williams
CE	4	Mark Elia
RW	5	Dane O'Hara
FE	6	James Leuluai
HB	7	Gary Freeman
PR	8	Adrian Shelford
HK	9	Wayne Wallace
PR	10	Peter Brown
SR	11	Owen Wright
SR	12	Hugh McGahan (c)
LK	13	Ron O'Regan
Substitutions:
IC	14	Marty Crequer
IC	15	Sam Stewart
Coach:
(New Zealand) Graham Lowe

=== Second test ===
This match counted towards the 1988 Rugby League World Cup.

17 August 1986

Papua New Guinea	24 – 22	New Zealand
Tries: Darius Haili (2); Bobby Ako; Lauta Atoi Goals: Dairi Kovae (4)		Tries: Peter Brown; Hugh McGahan; Joe Ropati; Wayne Wallace; Goals: Peter Brown (3)

Lloyd Robson Oval, Port Moresby
Attendance: 15,000
Referee: Kevin Roberts (Australia)
Player of the Match: Arebo Taumaku

Papua New Guinea	New Zealand

FB	1	Kungas Kuveu
RW	2	Joe Katsir
CE	3	Lauta Atoi (c)
CE	4	Bal Numapo
LW	5	Arnold Tivelit
FE	6	Darius Haili
HB	7	Gessau Gebob
PR	8	Joe Tep
HK	9	Roy Heni
PR	10	Bobby Ako
SR	11	Roy Loitive
SR	12	Bernard Waketsi
LF	13	Arebo Taumaku
Substitutions:
IC	14	Dairi Kovae
IC	15	Peter Peng
Coach:
(New Zealand) Barry Wilson

FB	1	Gary Kemble
LW	2	Joe Ropati
CE	3	Darrell Williams
CE	4	Mark Elia
RW	5	Dane O'Hara
FE	6	James Leuluai
HB	7	Gary Freeman
PR	8	Adrian Shelford
HK	9	Wayne Wallace
PR	10	Peter Brown
SR	11	Owen Wright
SR	12	Hugh McGahan (c)
LK	13	Ron O'Regan
Substitutions:
IC	14	Marty Crequer
IC	15	Sam Stewart
Coach:
(New Zealand) Graham Lowe

Papua New Guinea scored their first ever test match victory against New Zealand and their first test win since defeating France 37–6 in 1977. The Kumuls would not win another test until 1990.

== Aftermath ==
Following the loss to Papua New Guinea, Graham Lowe resigned in August to take up the position of head coach with English club side Wigan. Tony Gordon was appointed as his replacement in September.

Dun Furner and Wally Lewis would lead the Australian team on the undefeated 1986 Kangaroo Tour of Great Britain and France at the end of the NSWRL and BRL seasons.

== See also ==
- Australia vs New Zealand in rugby league
- 1985-88 Rugby League World Cup
