= 1985 New Zealand rugby league tour =

1985 Kiwis tour
- Date: 6 October 1985 – 12 December 1985
- Manager: Jim Campbell; Tom McKeown
- Coach: Graham Lowe
- Tour captain: Mark Graham
Summary
P	W	D	L
Total
19	15	1	3
Test match
5	3	1	1
Opponent
P	W	D	L
Great Britain
3	1	1	1
France
2	2	0	0

Tour chronology
- ← 1980 1989 →

The 1985 New Zealand rugby league tour was a series of matches played between October and December by the New Zealand national rugby league team in England and France. The team played a three-game series against Great Britain, named the Whitbread Trophy Bitter Tests for sponsorship reasons, and the tied the series 1–1. The team also defeated France 2–0.

== Background ==
New Zealand last toured Great Britain in 1980.

Despite tense relations between France and New Zealand over the sinking of the Rainbow Warrior, the team went ahead with the French leg of the tour as planned.

== Touring party ==
A 24-man touring squad was selected in August 1985, with Mark Graham named as captain. The squad included six players who played in the Australian Winfield Cup competition. New Zealand players contracted to British clubs were not included in the squad, but could still be considered for selection in Test matches.

Graham Lowe was the coach, and Jim Campbell was the team manager.

Prior to the tour, Marty Crequer withdrew from the squad due to injury, and was replaced by Shane Horo. Crequer was later called up as a replacement during the tour for the injured Joe Ropati. Ross Taylor also suffered an injury on tour, and was replaced by Brent Todd.

Name	Club/District
Dean Bell	(Australia) Eastern Suburbs
Mark Bourneville	(New Zealand) Auckland
Shane Cooper	(New Zealand) Auckland
Ricky Cowan	(New Zealand) Auckland
Marty Crequer	(New Zealand) Canterbury
Mark Elia	(New Zealand) Auckland
Olsen Filipaina	(Australia) Eastern Suburbs
Clayton Friend	(New Zealand) Auckland
Glen Gibb	(New Zealand) West Coast
James Goulding	(New Zealand) Auckland
Mark Graham (c)	(Australia) North Sydney
Shane Horo	(New Zealand) Waikato
Hugh McGahan	(Australia) Eastern Suburbs
Vaun O'Callaghan	(New Zealand) Waikato
Ron O'Regan	(New Zealand) Auckland
Joe Ropati	(New Zealand) Auckland
Adrian Shelford	(New Zealand) Canterbury
Dane Sorensen	(Australia) Cronulla-Sutherland
Kurt Sorensen	(Australia) Cronulla-Sutherland
Sam Stewart	(New Zealand) Wellington
Howie Tamati	(New Zealand) Taranaki
Ross Taylor	(New Zealand) Canterbury
Brent Todd	(New Zealand) Canterbury
Wayne Wallace	(New Zealand) Canterbury
Darrell Williams	(New Zealand) Auckland
Owen Wright	(New Zealand) Auckland

== Schedule and results ==
Date	Opponents	Score (NZ first)	Venue	Attendance	Notes
6 October	Wigan	8–14	Wigan	13,009	
9 October	Great Britain under-21	16–12	Bradford	2,285	
13 October	Hull Kingston Rovers	20–10	Hull	6,585	
15 October	Cumbria	32–6	Whitehaven	5,500	
19 October	Great Britain	24–22	Leeds	12,591	
23 October	Yorkshire	8–18	Bradford	3,745	
27 October	St Helens	46–8	St Helens	7,897	
29 October	Leeds	16–10	Leeds	4,713	
2 November	Great Britain	8–25	Wigan	15,506	
4 November	Widnes	32–12	Widnes	5,200	
9 November	Great Britain	6–6	Leeds	22,209	This match counted towards the 1985–1988 Rugby League World Cup
13 November	Lancashire	—N/a	Oldham		Postponed due to a frozen pitch
17 November	Hull	33–10	Hull	8,500	
20 November	Invitational XIII	20–8	Paris	1,500	
24 November	France	22–0	Marseille	1,492	
28 November	Midi-Pyrenees XIII	18–12	Toulouse	3,000	
1 December	Languedoc/Roussillon XIII	66–1	Carcassonne	5,000	
7 December	France	22–0	Perpignan	5,000	This match counted towards the 1985–1988 Rugby League World Cup
10 December	Rest of the World	22–10	Narbonne	700	
12 December	Aquitane/Côte d'Azur	22–10	Bordeaux	1,930	

== Aftermath ==
For the series against Great Britain, the Man of the Series was awarded to Great Britain's John Fieldhouse and Dane Sorensen for New Zealand.
