= 1989 Kangaroo tour of New Zealand =

1989 rugby league tour

The 1989 Kangaroo Tour of New Zealand was a mid-season tour of New Zealand by the Australia national rugby league team. The Australians played six matches on tour, including a three test series against the New Zealand national rugby league team. The tour began on 4 July and finished on 23 July.

Australia, the reigning Rugby League World Cup champions after having defeated New Zealand 25–12 in the 1988 World Cup Final at Auckland's Eden Park ground, defeated the home side 3–0 in the series. The third test of the series also doubled as the first match of the 1989–1992 Rugby League World Cup tournament.

The series was broadcast to Australia by the Nine Network with commentary provided by Ray Warren and Darrell Eastlake with former New Zealand coach Graham Lowe giving special comments from the Nine studios in Brisbane for the first two tests.

As of 2024, this remains the last full mid-season Kangaroo tour of New Zealand in which the Australians played against club and regional teams.

== Leadership ==
Don Furner had stepped down after three successful years as coach and was replaced by 1978 Kangaroo tour captain and Manly-Warringah's 1987 premiership winning coach Bob Fulton. Wally Lewis was the captain of the side as he had been since 1984 while Manly-Warringah's Paul Vautin was the team vice-captain. Vautin captained the team in the three non-test games of the tour.

== Touring squad ==
Queensland had won the 1989 State of Origin series with a 3–0 clean sweep of New South Wales prior to the tour. Of the 20 man touring team, 12 were from Qld with 8 from NSW. Balmain Tigers front rower Steve Roach was the only tourist who had not played in the Origin series.

Only 10 players from the touring party would go on to be selected for the 1990 Kangaroo tour of Great Britain and France (Alexander, Belcher, Bella, Hancock, Hasler, Meninga as captain, Roach, Shearer, Sironen and Walters).

Player	Club	Position(s)	Games	Tests	Tries	Goals	F/Goals	Points
Greg Alexander	Penrith Panthers	Halfback	5	2	5	–	–	–
Sam Backo	Brisbane Broncos	Prop	6	3	1	–	–	4
Gary Belcher	Canberra Raiders	Fullback	5	3	3	–	–	12
Martin Bella	North Sydney Bears	Prop	3	–	–	–	–	–
Bradley Clyde	Canberra Raiders	Second-row	4	3	1	–	–	4
Tony Currie	Brisbane Broncos	Centre	5	3	2	–	–	8
Michael Hancock	Brisbane Broncos	Wing	6	3	3	–	–	12
Des Hasler	Manly-Warringah Sea Eagles	Five-eighth, Halfback	4	2	1	–	–	4
Peter Jackson	Brisbane Broncos	Centre	3	–	–	–	–	–
Wally Lewis (c)	Brisbane Broncos	Five-eighth	3	3	–	–	–	–
Bruce McGuire	Balmain Tigers	Second-row, Lock	5	2	–	–	–	–
Mal Meninga	Canberra Raiders	Centre, Second-row	3	3	1	8	–	20
Michael O'Connor	Manly-Warringah Sea Eagles	Wing	5	2	3	15	–	42
Steve Roach	Balmain Tigers	Prop	5	3	–	–	–	–
Dale Shearer	Manly-Warringah Sea Eagles	Wing, Fullback, Centre	5	3	5	–	–	20
Paul Sironen	Balmain Tigers	Second-row	3	2	1	–	–	4
Dan Stains	Cronulla-Sutherland Sharks	Second-row	3	–	–	–	–	–
David Trewhella	Eastern Suburbs Roosters	Hooker	3	–	–	–	–	–
Paul Vautin (vc)	Manly-Warringah Sea Eagles	Lock, Five-eighth	6	3	–	1	–	2
Kerrod Walters	Brisbane Broncos	Hooker	5	3	1	–	–	4

== Tour ==
The Australians played six games on the tour, winning five.

Tuesday 4 July

New Zealand XIII	18 – 50	Australia
Tries: Duane Mann, Kelly Shelford, Dave Watson; Goals: Phil Bancroft (3)		Tries: Greg Alexander (3), Gary Belcher (3), Sam Backo, Des Hasler, Michael O'Connor; Goals: Michael O'Connor (7)

Palmerston North Showgrounds
Attendance: 5,000
Referee: Jim Stokes

New Zealand XIII: Morvin Edwards, Sam Panapa, Dave Watson, Tea Ropati, David Ewe, Kelly Shelford, Phil Bancroft, George Mann, Duane Mann, Russell Tuuta, Shane Hansen, Francis Leota, Mike Kuiti (c). Res - Gary Mercer, Peter Brown.

Australia: Gary Belcher, Michael O'Connor, Peter Jackson, Tony Currie, Michael Hancock, Des Hasler, Greg Alexander, Sam Backo, David Trewhella, Steve Roach, Bruce McGuire, Dan Stains, Paul Vautin (c). Res - Kerrod Walters, Martin Bella.

=== First test ===
Sunday 9 July

New Zealand	6 – 26	Australia
Tries: Mark Elia Goals: Kevin Iro (1/2)		Tries: Tony Currie; Wally Lewis; Paul Sironen; Kerrod Walters; Goals: Mal Meninga (5/5)

Queen Elizabeth II Park, Christchurch
Attendance: 17,000
Referee: Ray Tennant (England)
Player of the Match: Bradley Clyde

New Zealand	Australia

FB	1	Darrell Williams
RW	2	Tony Iro
CE	3	Kevin Iro
CE	4	Tony Kemp
LW	5	Mark Elia
FE	6	Shane Cooper
HB	7	Clayton Friend
PR	8	Brent Todd
HK	9	Barry Harvey
PR	10	James Goulding
SR	11	Hugh McGahan (c)
SR	12	Sam Stewart
LF	13	Brendon Tuuta
Substitutions:
IC	14	Gary Freeman
IC	15
IC	16
IC	17	Mark Horo
Coach:
(New Zealand) Tony Gordon

FB	1	Gary Belcher
RW	2	Dale Shearer
CE	3	Mal Meninga
CE	4	Tony Currie
LW	5	Michael Hancock
FE	6	Wally Lewis (c)
HB	7	Greg Alexander
PR	8	Sam Backo
HK	9	Kerrod Walters
PR	10	Steve Roach
SR	11	Paul Sironen
SR	12	Bradley Clyde
LF	13	Paul Vautin
Substitutions:
IC	14	Michael O'Connor
IC	15	Bruce McGuire
IC	16
IC	17
Coach:
(Australia) Bob Fulton

Wednesday 12 July

Auckland	26 – 24	Australia
Tries: Shane Hansen, Francis Leota, Mike Patton, Dave Watson; Goals: Kelly Shelford (5/6); Tea Ropati (0/1)		Tries: Dale Shearer (2), Greg Alexander, Tony Currie, Michael Hancock; Goals: Michael O'Connor (2/5)

Carlaw Park, Auckland
Attendance: 9,000
Referee: Bill Shrimpton

Auckland: Carl Magatogia, Sam Panapa, Mike Patton, Dave Watson, Kevin Pulieta, Kelly Shelford (c), Neville Ramsay, Mike Thomson, Peter Ropati, George Mann, Tawera Nikau, Francis Leota, Shane Hansen. Res - Tea Ropati, Taime Tagaloa. Coach - Cameron Bell

Australia: Dale Shearer, Michael O'Connor, Peter Jackson, Tony Currie, Michael Hancock, Des Hasler, Greg Alexander, Sam Backo, David Trewhella, Martin Bella, Dan Stains, Bruce McGuire, Paul Vautin (c). Res - Bradley Clyde.

The 26-24 loss to Auckland was the Kangaroos first loss to a club or provincial team since losing 12-11 to NZ side South Island during the 1980 NZ tour. As of 2024 it remains the last time an Australian side has lost a non-test match. This was also the last time the Australians would play a match at Carlaw Park.

=== Second test ===
Sunday 16 July

New Zealand	0 – 8	Australia
Tries: Goals: Phil Bancroft (0/1); Kevin Iro (0/2); Tony Kemp (0/1)		Tries: Michael Hancock; Goals: Mal Meninga (2/3)

Rotorua International Stadium, Rotorua
Attendance: 26,000
Referee: Ray Tennant (England)

New Zealand	Australia

FB	1	Darrell Williams
RW	2	Tony Iro
CE	3	Kevin Iro
CE	4	Tony Kemp
LW	5	Gary Mercer
FE	6	Shane Cooper
HB	7	Gary Freeman
PR	8	Brent Todd
HK	9	Duane Mann
PR	10	James Goulding
SR	11	Hugh McGahan (c)
SR	12	Sam Stewart
LF	13	Brendon Tuuta
Substitutions:
IC	14	Phil Bancroft
IC	15
IC	16
IC	17	Mark Horo
Coach:
(New Zealand) Tony Gordon

FB	1	Gary Belcher
RW	2	Dale Shearer
CE	3	Mal Meninga
CE	4	Tony Currie
LW	5	Michael Hancock
FE	6	Wally Lewis (c)
HB	7	Greg Alexander
PR	8	Sam Backo
HK	9	Kerrod Walters
PR	10	Steve Roach
SR	11	Paul Sironen
SR	12	Bradley Clyde
LF	13	Paul Vautin
Substitutions:
IC	14	Des Hasler
IC	15	Bruce McGuire
IC	16	Michael O'Connor
IC	17	David Trewhella
Coach:
(Australia) Bob Fulton

Wednesday 19 July

Wellington	10 – 28	Australia
Tries: Morvin Edwards; Goals: George Lajpold (3)		Tries: Dale Shearer (2), Greg Alexander, Michael Hancock, Michael O'Connor; Goals: Michael O'Connor (3); Paul Vautin (1)

Basin Reserve, Wellington
Attendance: 5,000
Referee: Alan Church

Wellington: Morvin Edwards, David Ewe, George Lajpold, Charlie McAlister, Victor Aramoana, Geoffrey Tangira, Sibi Raika, Arnold Lomax, Barry Harvey (c), Daroa Ben-Moide, Sonny Whakarau, Kelly Makoare, Mike Kuiti. Coach – Howie Tamati

Australia: Gary Belcher, Michael O'Connor, Peter Jackson, Dale Shearer, Michael Hancock, Paul Vautin (c), Greg Alexander, Steve Roach, David Trewhella, Martin Bella, Dan Stains, Paul Sironen, Bruce McGuire. Res - Kerrod Walters, Sam Backo.

As of 2024, this remains the last game Australia has played against a NZ club or provincial side.

=== Third test ===
The dead rubber third test also doubled as the first game of the 1989–1992 Rugby League World Cup tournament and it also saw the first time that the Mount Smart Stadium would host a rugby league test match. Australia's vice-captain Paul Vautin played his 13th and last test match. Tony Currie, Sam Backo and Bruce McGuire also played their last tests. With Paul Sironen out injured having rolled an ankle at training, Mal Meninga was moved into the second row for only the second (and last) time in his test career. After 9 tests on the wing, Dale Shearer played his first test at centre with Manly team mate Michael O'Connor coming in on the wing. This would also be the 24th and last time Wally Lewis would captain Australia in a test match.

For the Kiwis, goal kicking Eastern Suburbs centre and former All Black Kurt Sherlock became a dual rugby international with his selection on the bench, while St Helens outside back Mark Elia was playing his 10th and final test in New Zealand colours (he would later appear twice for Western Samoa in the 1995 Rugby League World Cup). Auckland 5/8 Kelly Shelford was also playing his first test for the Kiwis and also took over the goal kicking after they had used three kickers without any success in Rotorua.

Sunday 23 July

New Zealand	14 – 22	Australia
Tries: Mark Elia; Gary Mercer Goals: Kelly Shelford (3/5)		Tries: Bradley Clyde; Mal Meninga; Michael O'Connor; Dale Shearer; Goals: Mal Meninga (1/3); Michael O'Connor (2/3)

Mount Smart Stadium, Auckland
Attendance: 15,000
Referee: Ray Tennant (England)
Player of the Match: Bradley Clyde

New Zealand	Australia

FB	1	Darrell Williams
RW	2	Gary Mercer
CE	3	Kevin Iro
CE	4	Tony Kemp
LW	5	Mark Elia
FE	6	Kelly Shelford
HB	7	Gary Freeman
PR	8	Brent Todd
HK	9	Duane Mann
PR	10	James Goulding
SR	11	Mark Horo
SR	12	Sam Stewart
LF	13	Hugh McGahan (c)
Substitutions:
IC	14	Kurt Sherlock
IC	15
IC	16	Brendon Tuuta
IC	17
Coach:
(New Zealand) Tony Gordon

FB	1	Gary Belcher
RW	2	Michael O'Connor
CE	3	Dale Shearer
CE	4	Tony Currie
LW	5	Michael Hancock
FE	6	Wally Lewis (c)
HB	7	Des Hasler
PR	8	Sam Backo
HK	9	Kerrod Walters
PR	10	Steve Roach
SR	11	Mal Meninga
SR	12	Bradley Clyde
LF	13	Paul Vautin
Substitutions:
IC	14
IC	15
IC	16	Bruce McGuire
IC	17
Coach:
(Australia) Bob Fulton

During the second half of the game, Australian captain Wally Lewis pulled off a massive (but fair) hit on Kiwi fullback Darrell Williams. Lewis later told that he thought he was lining up Brendon Tuuta who had produced a fair bit of foul play through the series, only to look down at the tackled player and find it was Williams and not Tuuta (who wasn't actually on the field at the time).

Following the game as a bit of a release at the end of the tour, Wally Lewis and Peter Jackson both Bungee jumped from the back of Mount Smart Stadium's main grandstand.

== Statistics ==
Leading Try Scorer

- 5 by Greg Alexander and Dale Shearer

Leading Point Scorer

- 42 by Michael O'Connor (3 tries, 15 goals)

Largest Attendance

- 26,000 - Second test vs New Zealand at Rotorua International Stadium

Largest non-test Attendance

- 9,000 - Australia vs Auckland at Carlaw Park
