= 1989 New Zealand rugby league tour of Great Britain and France =

1989 Kiwis tour
- Date: 1 October 1989 – 3 December 1989
- Manager: Ian Jenkins; Tom McKeown
- Coach: Tony Gordon
- Tour captain: Hugh McGahan
- Top point scorer: Phil Bancroft (100)
- Top try scorer: Dave Watson (17)
Summary
P	W	D	L
Total
17	13	0	4
Test match
5	3	0	2
Opponent
P	W	D	L
Great Britain
3	1	0	2
France
2	2	0	0

Tour chronology
- ← 1985 1993 →

The 1989 New Zealand rugby league tour was a series of matches played between October and December by the New Zealand national rugby league team in England and France. The team lost a series 1–2 against Great Britain but defeated France 2–0.

== Background ==
New Zealand last toured Great Britain in 1985.

Earlier in 1989, New Zealand lost all three Tests at home to Australia on the 1989 Kangaroo tour.

== Touring party ==
A 26-man touring squad was selected in September 1989, with Hugh McGahan named as captain, and Gary Freeman as vice-captain. Tony Gordon was the coach, while Ian Jenkins and Tom McKeown were appointed as tour managers.

Dean Bell (Wigan) and Kurt Sorensen (Widnes) were not included in the touring squad, but could still be selected for the Tests against Great Britain and France.

James Goulding and Tea Ropati were injured during the tour, and were replaced by George Mann and David Ewe. Ewe was later sent home early from the tour due to misconduct.

Name	Club/District
Phil Bancroft	(New Zealand) Auckland
Dean Clark	(New Zealand) Auckland
Morvin Edwards	(New Zealand) Wellington
Mark Elia	(Australia) Canterbury-Bankstown
David Ewe	(New Zealand) Wellington
Esene Faimalo	(New Zealand) Canterbury
Gary Freeman (vc)	(Australia) Balmain
James Goulding	(Australia) Newcastle
Kevin Iro	(England) Wigan
Tony Kemp	(Australia) Newcastle
Mike Kuiti	(New Zealand) Wellington
Francis Leota	(New Zealand) Auckland
Duane Mann	(New Zealand) Auckland
George Mann	(England) St Helens
Hugh McGahan (c)	(Australia) Eastern Suburbs
Gary Mercer	(New Zealand) Bay of Plenty
Tawera Nikau	(New Zealand) Auckland
Tea Ropati	(New Zealand) Auckland
Adrian Shelford	(England) Wigan
Kelly Shelford	(New Zealand) Auckland
Kurt Sherlock	(Australia) Eastern Suburbs
Sam Stewart	(Australia) Newcastle
Whetu Taewa	(New Zealand) Canterbury
Brent Todd	(Australia) Canberra
Brendon Tuuta	(New Zealand) Canterbury
Wayne Wallace	(New Zealand) Canterbury
Dave Watson	(New Zealand) Auckland
Darrell Williams	(Australia) Manly-Warringah

== Schedule and results ==
Date	Opponents	Score (NZ first)	Venue	Attendance	Notes
1 October	St Helens	26–27	St Helens	6,940	
3 October	Castleford	22–20	Castleford	5,963	
8 October	Wigan	14–24	Wigan	15,083	
11 October	Bradford Northern	26–8	Bradford	3,598	
15 October	Leeds	34–4	Leeds	9,218	
17 October	Cumbria	28–2	Whitehaven	3,983	
21 October	Great Britain	24–16	Manchester	18,273	
28 October	Great Britain	6–26	Leeds	13,000	
1 November	Hull	44–8	Hull	5,898	
5 November	Widnes	26–18	Widnes	9,905	
7 November	Featherstone Rovers	44–20	Featherstone	2,830	
11 November	Great Britain	6–10	Wigan	20,346	This match counted towards the 1989–1992 Rugby League World Cup
15 November	Midi-Pyrenees XIII	36–12	Toulouse	1,000	
19 November	France	16–14	Carcassonne	3,500	
22 November	Selection de L'Aude	70–0	Carcassonne	500	
25 November	France B	62–4	Albi	1,500	
3 December	France	34–0	Carcassonne	4,208	This match counted towards the 1989–1992 Rugby League World Cup

== Aftermath ==
The tourists were the first New Zealand team to lose a series in Great Britain since 1965.

Following the conclusion of the tour, many players in the squad signed contracts with English clubs.
