= 1983 New Zealand rugby league season =

Seasons
- 1982 1984

The 1983 New Zealand rugby league season was the 76th season of rugby league that had been played in New Zealand.

== International competitions ==
New Zealand drew a series with Australia 1-all and defeated Papua New Guinea 60–20. New Zealand were coached by Graham Lowe and included; Fred Ah Kuoi, Dean Bell, Ian Bell, Mark Broadhurst, first Test captain Mark Graham, Gary Kemble, James Leuluai, Ron O'Regan, Gary Prohm, Joe Ropati, Gordon Smith, Dane and Kurt Sorensen, PNG Test captain Howie Tamati, Shane Varley, second Test captain Graeme West, Nick Wright, Robin Alfeld, Marty Crequer, Clayton Friend, Frank Tinitelia, Hugh McGahan, Dean Orr and John Ackland. In the match against Papua New Guinea, McGahan scored a world Test record six tries.

First Division champions Hull FC, who included James Leuluai and Gary Kemble, drew 16-all with Auckland at Carlaw Park.

New Zealand Māori toured the United Kingdom. Coached by Andy Berryman, the side included Nolan Tupaea, Pat Poasa, Riki Cowan, Russell Tuuta, Owen Wright, Hugh McGahan, Kevin Schaumkell, Cedric Lovett, Dean Bell, Mark Roiall, Dick Uluave, Tom Waitai, Joe Ropati, Lou Kupa, Trevor Clark, Charles Paki, Clayton Friend, Ron O'Regan (vice-captain), Ian Bell (captain), Nick Wright and Anthony Murray.

James Leuluai won the New Zealand Rugby League's player of the year award.

== National competitions ==
=== Rugby League Cup ===
Wellington again held the Rugby League Cup at the end of the season.

=== Inter-district competition ===
Auckland won the Inter-Districts competition.

Auckland defeated Central Districts 52–2 at Carlaw Park. Auckland were coached Bob Bailey and included Ron O'Regan, Dean Bell, John Ackland, Dean Bell, James Leuluai, Owen Wright, Mark Bourneville and Nick Wright. Auckland also defeated New Zealand Māori 44–2.

=== District competition ===
The West Coast defeated Canterbury 28–8 at Wingham Park. Their biggest win since 1948.

Canterbury B defeated Otago-Southland 20–16.

=== National Club competition ===
Otahuhu won the Tusk Cup, defeating Randwick 30–22. Otahuhu had eliminated the Mount Albert Lions 14–8 in a quarterfinal.

== Australasian competition ==
Central Districts were eliminated in Round one of the KB Cup when they lost 50–0 to the Newtown Jets at Leichhardt Oval.

== Club competitions ==
=== Auckland ===
Otahuhu won the Auckland Rugby League's Fox Memorial Trophy and Kiwi Shield. They defeated the Mount Albert Lions 14–11 in the Fox Memorial Grand Final. Mount Albert won the Rukutai Shield while Manukau won the Roope Rooster and Stormont Shield. Richmond won the Sharman Cup while Glenora/Kelston won the Norton Cup.

Owen Wright (Otahuhu) won the Best and Fairest award. Darryl Morrison (Otahuhu) won the Lipscombe Cup, Ron O'Regan (City Newton) again won the Rothville Trophy, John Ackland (Mt Albert) and Joe Ropati (Otahuhu) won the Bert Humphries Memorial, Paul Sorich (Ellerslie) won the Tetley Trophy, Phil Harrison(Northcote) won the Painter Rosebowl Trophy and Ian Gorden Otahuhu) won the Hyland Memorial Cup.

Mark Bourneville played for Mount Albert while Otahuhu included Hugh McGahan, Frank Tinitelia and Owen Wright.

=== Wellington ===
Randwick won the Wellington Rugby League's Appleton Shield.

=== Canterbury ===
Hornby won the Canterbury Rugby League's Pat Smith Challenge Trophy.

=== Other Competitions ===
The Waitara Bears defeated Western Suburbs 16–12 in the Taranaki Rugby League grand final.
