= NZRL National Club Competition =

New Zealand rugby competition

The NZRL National Club Competition was a rugby league competition run by the New Zealand Rugby League (NZRL). The competition was an end-of-season tournament played by the best teams from each region of New Zealand. It was first staged in 1982, and was contested annually until 1992, when it was scrapped following the introduction of a new national league competition; the Lion Red Cup. The competition was briefly revived as a one-off event in 2007.

== History ==
The first attempt at establishing a national rugby league competition in New Zealand occurred in the early 1960s. The tournament was held as a club competition between 1962 and 1964, but was then re-organised as a provincial tournament. A new national club competition was announced in 1981, with the first staging of the competition taking place in the 1982 season. The competition continued until 1992, after which it was superseded by a new national league competition, which became known as the Lion Red Cup. Following the demise of the Bartercard Cup, the club competition briefly returned in 2007, but has not been contested since.

== Format ==
The format of the tournament was a 16-team knockout competition. Each region was represented by at least one team, while stronger leagues such as Auckland, Canterbury and Wellington were typically awarded multiple berths. In 1992, the competition was reduced to eight teams, and the knock-out format was replaced by a round-robin tournament, with the teams split into two groups of four.

== Winners ==
Year	Champions	Score	Runners-up
1982	Petone	16–14	Randwick
1983	Otahuhu	30–22	Randwick
1984	Mt Albert	24–10	Randwick
1985	Manukau	34–13	Randwick
1986	Te Atatu	36–10	Mt Albert
1987	Northcote	14–12	Mangere East
1988	Te Atatu	18–8	Glenora
1989	Northcote	10–4	Wainuiomata
1990	Wainuiomata	34–12	Otahuhu
1991	Northcote	30–12	Randwick
1992	Wainuiomata	25–18	Northcote
1993–2006: No competition
2007	Wainuiomata	25–18	Papakura

== Sponsorship ==
Period	Sponsor	Name
1982	Standfast Ltd.	Wrangler Cup
1983–1985	Standfast Ltd.	Tusk Cup
1986–1988	Lion Breweries	Lion Red League Nationals
1989–1992	Lion Breweries	Lion Red League Cup
