= Andrew Chalmers =

Andrew Chalmers may refer to:

- Andrew Chalmers (actor) (born 1992), Canadian actor
- Andrew Chalmers (footballer) (born 1899), Scottish professional footballer
- Andrew Chalmers (rugby league) New Zealand businessman rugby league player
