= Kyle Shelford =

English rugby league footballer (born 1996)

Personal information
- Born: 13 September 1996 (age 30) Wigan, Greater Manchester, England
- Height: 5 ft 11 in (1.80 m)
- Weight: 13 st 5 lb (85 kg)

Playing information
- Position: Loose forward, Hooker
Club
Years	Team	Pld	T	G	FG	P
2016–17	Wigan Warriors	1	0	0	0	0
2016(loan)	→ Swinton Lions	1	0	0	0	0
2017(loan)	→ Workington Town	6	0	0	0	0
2018–19	Swinton Lions	34	4	0	0	16
2019–20	Rochdale Hornets	6	1	0	0	4
2020–	Warrington Wolves	1	0	0	0	0
	Total	49	5	0	0	20
- Source: As of 10 March 2021
- Father: Adrian Shelford

Kyle Shelford (born 13 September 1996) is an English professional rugby league footballer who plays as a loose forward and hooker for the Warrington Wolves in the Super League.

He previously played for the Swinton Lions in the Championship.

== Background ==
Shelford was born in Wigan, Greater Manchester, England.

He is the son of former late New Zealand international Adrian Shelford.

== Career ==
=== Wigan Warriors ===
In 2016 Shelford played once for Wigan and once for Swinton on dual registration. In 2017, Shelford joined Workington Town on a season-long loan deal. In October 2017 he signed for Swinton.

=== Swinton Lions ===
Shelford played part-time for Swinton after leaving Wigan

=== Rochdale Hornets ===
On 21 Jun 2019 it was reported that he had signed for Rochdale Hornets in the RFL League 1

=== Warrington Wolves ===
On 26 Jan 2020 it was reported that he had signed for Warrington Wolves in the Super League on a part-time contract

In Sep 2020 Shelford made his Super League debut for the Warrington Wolves vs Salford Red Devils.
