= Dairi Kovae =

PNG international rugby league footballer

Personal information
- Full name: Dairi Kovae
- Born: NCD, Papua New Guinea

Playing information
- Position: Fullback, Wing, Centre
Club
| Years | Team | Pld | T | G | FG | P |
|---|---|---|---|---|---|---|
| 1988 | North Sydney Bears | 2 | 0 | 0 | 0 | 0 |
| 1989 | Newcastle Knights | 8 | 1 | 0 | 0 | 4 |
| | Total | 10 | 1 | 0 | 0 | 4 |
Representative
| Years | Team | Pld | T | G | FG | P |
| 1986–88 | Papua New Guinea | 9 | 5 | 9 | 0 | 38 |
| 1988 | Rest of the World | 1 | 0 | 0 | 0 | 0 |
- As of 14 Jul 2021

Dairi Kovae is a Papua New Guinean former professional rugby league footballer who played in the 1980s. He played for the second division North Sydney Bears in 1988 and the Newcastle Knights in 1989. He played for Papua New Guinea from 1986 to 1989.

His rugby league career started with his local village team, Porebada DCA. Played in the Port Moresby rugby league competition. Won the comps grand final in 1986 and scouted straight to North Sydney Bears in 1988 and transferred to the Newcastle Knights in 1989.

== Playing career ==
- Porebada DCA - 1985-1986
- North Sydney Bears Reserve grade - 1988
- Newcastle Knights (first grade Debut, Round 2) - 1989
- Rest of the World Team - 1988
- PNG Kumuls - 1986-1989
