= Barry Wilson (rugby league) =

Former professional RL coach

Personal information
- Full name: Barry Wilson

Coaching information
Representative
Years	Team	Gms	W	D	L	W%
1986–87	Papua New Guinea	4	1	0	3	25

Barry Wilson was the coach of the PNG Kumuls Team in 1986 during which they defeated the New Zealand 24–22 on 17 Aug 1986 in Port Moresby.
