= Kungas Kuveu =

Papua New Guinean rugby league footballer

Kungas Kuveu is a Papua New Guinean former professional rugby league footballer who played in the 1970s and 1980s.

From the New Ireland Province, he was a Papua New Guinea fullback who was part of the team that beat the New Zealand in 1986.
