= Andrew Chalmers (rugby league) =

New Zealand rugby league player

- Education: Bachelors in Marketing (Hon) Massey University | Masters in Finance Massey University

Andrew Chalmers is a New Zealand ex rugby league player, businessman and millionaire former owner of the Bradford Bulls rugby club along with Graham Lowe Chalmers is also the former chairman of New Zealand Rugby League As of 2024 he is in the process of creating a second team, bidding NZ$60m to revive the Wellington Orcas for the NZRL.

== Rugby career ==
After studying at Massey University, he joined a rugby league Wainuiomata team.

Chalmers was a back-rower who converted to a fullback. At a New Zealand Maori tournament he was recruited by an Australian team St. George Dragons. He trained with St. George Dragons in 1992 before joining Manly.

He played reserve grade at Manly and at the Balmain Tigers before he broke his arm twice and broke his thumb.

== Business career ==
Chalmers has a bachelor's in marketing and honours' and master's degrees in finance from Massey University, additionally he worked as an associate lecturer at the University of New South Wales.

After his time playing Rugby league he spent seven years in Sydney as a CEO of a travel company with 550 staff and an annual revenue of $A280 million. Chalmers went on to work as the CEO of New Zealand forestry companies Harvest Pro and Kiwi Forestry.Chalmers also works as the executive director of Pango New Zealand.

In 2017 following the English rugby club's liquidation, Chalmers along with Graham Lowe purchased the Bradford Bulls. Facing mounting debts and player departures he announced he was selling the club in October 2019. The pair also founded the recruitment agency Lowie Recruitment.
