= Darius Haili =

Papua New Guinean rugby league footballer

Personal information
- Born: Papua New Guinea

Playing information
- Position: Five-eighth
Representative
Years	Team	Pld	T	G	FG	P
1981–88	Papua New Guinea	10	3	2	0	16

Darius Haili is a Papua New Guinean former professional rugby league footballer who played for the Papua New Guinea Kumuls at five-eighth. He scored two tries against the New Zealand national rugby league team in 1986 in Port Moresby in the Kumuls first ever victory over the Kiwis.
