= Arebo Taumaku =

Former PNG international rugby league footballer

Personal information
- Born: Papua New Guinea

Playing information
- Position: Second-row, Lock
Representative
Years	Team	Pld	T	G	FG	P
1982–90	Papua New Guinea	12	1	1	0	6

Papua New Guinea

Arebo Taumaku was a Papua New Guinean rugby league player who represented Papua New Guinea, including in the Rugby League World Cup matches.
