= Brendon Tuuta =

NZ international rugby league footballer

Personal information
- Full name: Brendon Ephia Tuuta
- Born: 29 April 1965 (age 61) Chatham Islands, New Zealand

Playing information
- Height: 178 cm (5 ft 10 in)
- Weight: 90 kg (14 st 2 lb)
- Position: Stand-off, Five-eighth, Second-row, Lock
Club
Years	Team	Pld	T	G	FG	P
1989–90	Western Suburbs	34	3	0	0	12
1990–95	Featherstone	155	29	0	1	117
1995	Western Reds	9	1	0	0	4
1995–97	Castleford Tigers	60	4	0	0	16
1998	Warrington	22	4	0	0	16
1999	Featherstone
	Total	280	41	0	1	165
Representative
Years	Team	Pld	T	G	FG	P
	Canterbury
	South Island
1989–95	New Zealand	16	1	0	0	4

Brendon Ephia Tuuta (born 29 April 1965) is a New Zealand former rugby league footballer of Māori (Ngāti Mutunga) and Moriori descent.

Tuuta played a variety of positions including stand-off, scrum-half, second-row and loose forward. He was known as "the baby-faced assassin" and had a reputation as a brawler.

== Background ==
He is related to Lewis Brown.

== Early years ==
Originally from the Chatham Islands, Tuuta played much of his youth league for Canterbury.

Tuuta withdrew from the New Zealand Māori squad for the 1986 Pacific Cup.

== Playing career ==
Tuuta first played professionally when he played for the Western Suburbs Magpies in the New South Wales Rugby League premiership between 1989 and 1990.

He was a New Zealand international between 1989 and 1995. During his début in 1989 he was involved in an incident where it was claimed he kneed Paul Vautin. He went on the 1989 Kiwis tour of Great Britain and France and played in Featherstone for the first time.

He then moved to Featherstone Rovers in England, playing in the second division. In 1993 he was suspended for six matches for breaking Nigel Heslop's jaw with a punch. He played loose forward in the Rovers' 20–16 victory over Workington Town in the 1992–93 Division Two Premiership Final at Old Trafford, Manchester on 19 May 1993.

Tuuta was a Canterbury representative and famously returned to New Zealand for the 1993 provincial grand final where Canterbury upset Auckland, earning the man of the match award that day.

During the 1995 Australian season, he returned to play for the Western Reds, before signing for the Castleford Tigers for the English 1995/96 season.

Tuuta joined the Warrington Wolves for the 1998 season but struggled with knee problems. Despite deciding to retire after 1998 he reconsidered and returned to Featherstone Rovers for one more season.

== Honours ==
Tuuta is a Featherstone Rovers' Hall of Fame inductee.

== Sources ==
- Alan Whiticker & Glen Hudson (2007). The Encyclopedia of Rugby League Players. Wetherill Park, New South Wales: Gary Allen Pty Ltd. ISBN 978-1-877082-93-1.
- Ron Bailey (2002). 100 Greats Featherstone Rovers Rugby League Football Club. The Mill, Brimscombe Port, Stroud, Gloucestershire: Tempus Publishing Limited. ISBN 0-7524-2713-X.
