= Wayne Dwyer =

New Zealand rugby league footballer

Personal information
- Full name: Wayne Patrick Dwyer
- Born: 24 May 1959 (age 65); New Zealand

Playing information
- Position: Second-row
Club
| Years | Team | Pld | T | G | FG | P |
|---|---|---|---|---|---|---|
| | Marist |
Representative
| Years | Team | Pld | T | G | FG | P |
| 1978–?? | West Coast |
| 19?? | South Island |
| 1982 | New Zealand |

Wayne Patrick Dwyer is a New Zealand former rugby league footballer who represented New Zealand.

== Early life ==
Dwyer was originally from the West Coast. He was educated at Marist Brothers High School, Greymouth.

== Playing career ==
A Marist representative, Dwyer first represented the West Coast in 1978.

During the 1980s Dwyer represented both the West Coast and the South Island. He was included in the New Zealand national rugby league team squad in 1982 but did not play a Test match for New Zealand.

He retired in 1998, with his last match being the West Coast Rugby League grand final.
