= Darrell Williams (rugby league) =

New Zealand rugby league footballer and coach

Personal information
- Full name: Darrell Christopher Williams
- Born: 30 August 1963 (age 63)

Playing information
- Position: Fullback, Centre, Wing
Club
Years	Team	Pld	T	G	FG	P
	Mount Albert
1987–93	Manly Sea Eagles	93	15	0	0	60
1994	Parramatta Eels	5	0	0	0	0
	Total	98	15	0	0	60
Representative
Years	Team	Pld	T	G	FG	P
	Auckland
1985–90	New Zealand	21	4	0	0	16

Coaching information
Representative
Years	Team	Gms	W	D	L	W%
2000	Samoa

Darrell Christopher Williams is a New Zealand rugby league selector and NRL Judiciary member and a former footballer and coach. A New Zealand international representative outside back, he played his club football in the Auckland Rugby League for Mt Albert and in Sydney's NSWRFL Premiership for the Manly-Warringah Sea Eagles (with whom he won the 1987 NSWRL Grand Final) and the Parramatta Eels. He later coached the Samoan national team.

== Playing career ==
=== New Zealand ===
Williams started his playing career in the Auckland Rugby League competition where he played with the Mt Albert club, junior club was the Waitemata Seagulls. His form for Mt Albert also saw him selected to play for the Auckland representative side against the 1984 Great Britain Lions tourists. He was selected to play for Auckland again, this time against Australia during the 1985 Kangaroo tour of New Zealand. He was selected for the 1985 New Zealand rugby league tour of Great Britain and France and would make his test debut playing on the wing in the third test against Great Britain at the Elland Road ground in Leeds which ended in a 6-all draw. Between 1985 and 1990, Williams gained selection for New Zealand on 21 occasions. He scored 5 tries in his test career including scoring a double in the third game of the 1986 Trans-Tasman Test series against Australia at Lang Park in Brisbane, though Australia would win the game 32–12 and the series 3–0.

=== Australia ===
Williams moved to Australia to play in the NSWRL premiership for the Manly-Warringah Sea Eagles at the start of the 1987 NSWRL season. He made his debut for the Sea Eagles in the wing in a 4-all draw with St George in the opening round of the season. On 21 July 1987, Williams played fullback for NZ in their shock 13–6 win over Australia at Lang Park. It would be the only time he would be on the winning side in 9 tests against the Australians. He would go on to play in Manly's Grand Final winning team that year, becoming the first Kiwi to play in an Australian grand final-winning team. Following the grand final victory he travelled with Manly to England for the 1987 World Club Challenge against their champions, Wigan.

During the 1988 Great Britain Lions tour the New Zealand national team hosted the British side for a Test match at Addington Showgrounds and Williams played for the Kiwis at fullback in their 12 – 10 defeat of Great Britain on Sunday, 17 July before a crowd of 8,525. The result of this match determined that New Zealand would contest the final of the 1985–1988 World Cup tournament's final to be played later in the year, but Williams did not play.

During the 1989 Kangaroo tour of New Zealand Williams was selected to play for the Kiwis at fullback in all three tests against Australia. In the third test of the 1989 Trans-Tasman series against Australia in Auckland, Williams was on the receiving end of a famous hit from Australian captain; Wally Lewis. This tackle was later described by commentator Ray Warren as easily the biggest he's ever seen.

During the 1990 Great Britain Lions tour Williams played for New Zealand against the British at fullback in the first test and at centre in the 2nd and 3rd. His final test appearance for NZ came on 19 August 1990 when he played in the centres against Australia at the Athletic Park stadium in Wellington, with the Australians winning the game 24–6.

The 1994 NSWRL season was Williams last and was spent playing for the Parramatta Eels.

== Later years ==
Following his retirement from playing at the end of the 1994 NSWRL season, Williams was appointed a National Rugby League judiciary member. He was later appointed coach of the Samoa national rugby league team for their 2000 World Cup campaign. Samoa reached the quarter-finals where they faced eventual champions Australia and were knocked out. Williams has also been a selector for the New Zealand national side. During the lead up to the 2008 NRL grand final Williams, at the time the longest-serving member of the NRL Judiciary, threatened legal action against the Melbourne Storm for criticism levelled at the judiciary over their controversial suspension of Storm captain Cameron Smith. This led to Storm coach Craig Bellamy and then-CEO Brian Waldron paying out $105,000 plus legal costs to Williams and the other judiciary panellists in late 2010.

Sporting positions
Preceded by Graham Lowe; 1995	Coach Samoa; 2000	Succeeded by John Ackland; 2007-2008
