= Glenn Donaldson (rugby league) =

New Zealand international rugby league footballer

Personal information
- Born: 14 February 1965 (age 61) New Zealand

Playing information
- Position: Scrum-half
Representative
| Years | Team | Pld | T | G | FG | P |
|---|---|---|---|---|---|---|
| 1986–91 | Bay of Plenty |
| 1986 | Northern Districts |
| 1986 | New Zealand | 0 | 0 | 0 | 0 | 0 |

Glenn Donaldson is a New Zealand former rugby league footballer who played in the 1980s and 1990s. He played at representative level for New Zealand, Northern Districts and Bay of Plenty, as a scrum-half.

== Playing career ==
Donaldson represented the Bay of Plenty and Northern Districts. In 1986 he was selected for the New Zealand national rugby league team but did not play a test match for the side. He played for the Bay of Plenty until 1991.

In 2011 he competed in a charity boxing match against a former Bay of Plenty Steamers rugby union representative.
