= Ray Haffenden =

New Zealand rugby league player and administrator

Ray Haffenden MNZM
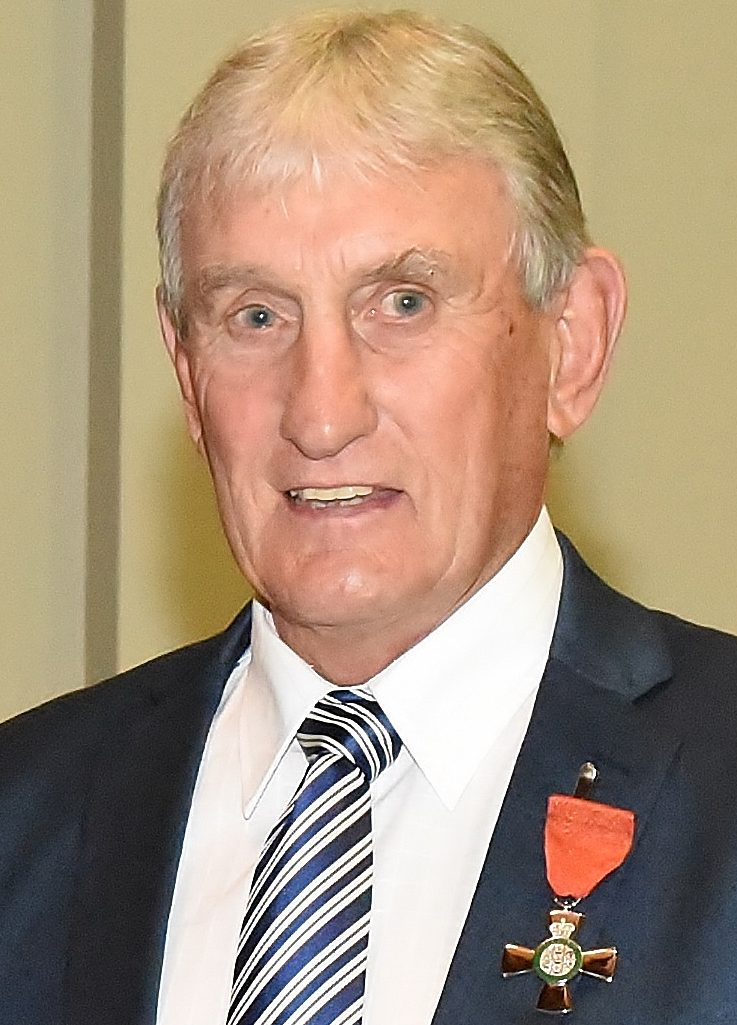
- Haffenden in 2017
- Born: Ray Kenway Haffenden
- Rugby league career

Playing information
- Position: Fullback
Club
| Years | Team | Pld | T | G | FG | P |
|---|---|---|---|---|---|---|
| | Linwood (CRL) |
Representative
| Years | Team | Pld | T | G | FG | P |
| 1970–74 | Canterbury | 4 |
| 1974 | South Island | 1 |

Coaching information
Representative
| Years | Team | Gms | W | D | L | W% |
| 1982–88 | Canterbury | 36 | 20 | 4 | 12 | 56 |
| | South Island |

Ray Kenway Haffenden MNZM is a New Zealand rugby league administrator and former player and coach who served as the New Zealand Rugby League's chairman. He currently serves as the NZRL vice-chairman.

== Playing career ==
Haffenden played for the Linwood Keas in the Canterbury Rugby League competition until he was 32. He played in the Keas' premiership winning teams in 1968 and 1970.

Haffenden played four games for Canterbury and represented the South Island against Great Britain in 1974.

== Coaching career ==
Haffenden coached Canterbury in 1982 and again from 1984, stepping down in 1988 with 20 wins, 4 draws and 12 losses. During this time he also coached the South Island.

In 1989 and 1990 he coached the Junior Kiwis, including a tour of Papua New Guinea. Haffenden also managed the New Zealand national rugby league team in 1990 and 1991 under coach Bob Bailey, who he had challenged for the position. He continued to manage the Kiwis under Frank Endacott until 1995.

== Administration career ==
Haffenden was voted onto the New Zealand Rugby League board in 1992, serving until 1995.

Haffenden later served on the judiciary for Bartercard Cup games and the New Zealand Rugby League judiciary panel. Haffenden is also a life member of the Linwood Keas club in Christchurch.

He was elected back onto the NZRL board and took over as chairman in November 2007. As chairman Haffenden took over in a time of turmoil and oversaw a SPARC review of the NZRL that led to its revamp in 2009. Haffenden's term as chairman ended with the restructure, however he was elected as the vice-chairman. Haffenden was part of the independent judiciary following the 2011 Bill Kelly Test match.

In the 2017 Queen's Birthday Honours, Haffenden was appointed a Member of the New Zealand Order of Merit for services to rugby league.
