= Frank Tinitelia =

New Zealand international rugby league footballer

Personal information
- Born: 15 October 1959 (age 67) New Zealand
- Height: 193 cm (6 ft 4 in)
- Weight: 120 kg (18 st 13 lb)

Playing information
- Position: Prop
Club
Years	Team	Pld	T	G	FG	P
	Otahuhu
Representative
Years	Team	Pld	T	G	FG	P
	Auckland
1983	New Zealand	1	0	0	0	0

Frank Tinitelia is a New Zealand former professional rugby league footballer who represented New Zealand.

== Playing career ==
A prop forward, Tinitelia played for the Otahuhu Leopards in the Auckland Rugby League competition.

He represented Auckland and in 1983 was called up to play for the New Zealand national rugby league team. He played in one test match against Papua New Guinea, becoming Kiwi number 577.
