= George Lajpold =

Cook Islands & NZ international rugby league footballer

Personal information
- Full name: George Turirua Lajpold
- Born: New Zealand

Playing information
- Position: Fullback
Club
Years	Team	Pld	T	G	FG	P
1976–96	Randwick	300+
Representative
Years	Team	Pld	T	G	FG	P
1979–92	Wellington
1982–87	Central Districts	20
1986	Cook Islands	6
1987	New Zealand	1	0	0	0	0

George Turirua Lajpold is a New Zealand former rugby league footballer who represented New Zealand.

== Playing career ==
Lajpold played for the Randwick Kingfishers club in the Wellington Rugby League competition and represented Wellington. He was selected for Central Districts in 1982. In 1987 he played for a New Zealand XIII before being selected to tour Australia with New Zealand. Lajpold sustained an injury when representing Wellington just prior to the tour. The injury was re-aggravated early in the tour and Lajpold returned to New Zealand. Lajpold also played 6 tests for his native country the Cook Islands in the Pacific Cup held in Rarotonga in 1986. Lajpold retired as a player in 1996 after 20 years of premier and representative league.
