= Robin Alfeld =

New Zealand international rugby league player (born 1956)

Personal information
- Full name: Robin Leonard Alfeld
- Born: 12 December 1956 (age 68); New Zealand
- Height: 181 cm (5 ft 11 in)
- Weight: 90 kg (14 st 2 lb; 198 lb)

Playing information
- Position: Fullback, Wing
Club
Years	Team	Pld	T	G	FG	P
1976–86	Hornby		116
Representative
Years	Team	Pld	T	G	FG	P
1977–1985	Canterbury	28	18
1979–85	South Island	18	4
1983	New Zealand	1	0	0	0	0

Robin Leonard Alfeld is a New Zealand rugby league player who represented New Zealand.

== Playing career ==
Alfeld played for the Hornby Panthers in the Canterbury Rugby League competition between 1976 and 1985, scoring 116 tries for his club - a Hornby club record. He played for Canterbury between 1977 and 1985, scoring 18 tries in 28 matches. Alfeld also played 18 games for the South Island between 1979 and 1985.

Alfeld retired in 1985 due to injury.

== Representative career ==
Alfeld played one test match for the New Zealand national rugby league team in 1981 against Papua New Guinea. He also played for Oceania against Europe in 1983 as part of the French Rugby League 50th anniversary celebrations and was a replacement for the New Zealand XIII that played Queensland in 1984.
