= Mike Kuiti =

New Zealand rugby league coach and former international rugby league footballer

Personal information
- Full name: Michael James Kuiti
- Born: 18 March 1963 (age 63) Foxton, New Zealand

Playing information
- Position: Second-row, Loose forward
Club
Years	Team	Pld	T	G	FG	P
1980–92	Upper Hutt Tigers
1985	Rochdale Hornets	18	6			24
1990–91	Leeds	41	16	0	0	64
1991–93	Rochdale Hornets	65	14	0	0	56
1993–95	Oldham	69	11	0	0	44
1995–96	Wakefield Trinity	30	3	0	0	12
1996–97	Batley	38	3	0	1	13
	Total	261	53	0	1	213
Representative
Years	Team	Pld	T	G	FG	P
1981–93	Wellington	59
	New Zealand Māori
1984–87	Central Districts	4
1989–92	New Zealand	6	1	0	0	4

Coaching information
Club
Years	Team	Gms	W	D	L	W%
1996	Batley	0	0	0	0

Michael James Kuiti (born 18 March 1963 in Foxton, New Zealand) is a New Zealand rugby league player who played professionally in England and represented New Zealand, including in test matches that counted towards the 1992 World Cup. Currently living in Lower Hutt, New Zealand.

== Playing career ==
Kuiti was a member of the Upper Hutt club in the Wellington Rugby League competition, making his senior début in 1980. He was part of premiership wins in 1986 and 1987. Kuiti played for the club until 1992, becoming club captain.

On 8 January 1990 Kuiti signed with the Leeds club. He spent three seasons at the club before joining Rochdale Hornets. Mike Kuiti played, and scored a try in Rochdale Hornets 14–24 defeat by St. Helens in the 1991 Lancashire Cup Final during the 1991–92 season at Wilderspool Stadium, Warrington, on Sunday 20 October 1991. Kuiti then spent three years at Oldham before joining Wakefield Trinity (captain) in 1996. Kuiti also played for the Batley Bulldogs and Swinton Lions.

== Representative career ==
Kuiti represented Wellington, making his début in 1981. Kuiti went on to play in 59 games for Wellington and is the sixth highest capped player. He played for Central Districts four times between 1984 and 1987 and also played for New Zealand Māori, including at the 1986 Pacific Cup.

Kuiti made his long-awaited New Zealand national rugby league team début on the 1989 tour of Great Britain and France. He played in eleven games on tour, including two test wins over France. He was dropped in 1990 for home tests against Great Britain before being reinstated for the 1990 tour of Papua New Guinea. He finished his international career with two tests against the touring Great Britain Lions in 1992.

== Coaching career ==
Kuiti was the head coach of the Porirua Pumas in the 2000 Bartercard Cup.

In 2010 Kuiti was the coach of the Hutt International Boys' School side in the Wellington Rugby League's Stephen Kearney Cup.

He coached the Wellington Orcas in the 2013 National Competition.

== Legacy ==
In 2012 he was named in the Wellington Rugby League's Team of the Century.
