= Glen Gibb =

New Zealand international rugby league footballer

Personal information
- Full name: Glen Lyndley Gibb
- Born: 5 December 1959 (age 66) New Zealand

Playing information
- Position: Scrum-half
Club
Years	Team	Pld	T	G	FG	P
19??–87	Runanga (WCRL)
1988–??	Cobden-Kohinoor (WCRL)
	Suburbs (WCRL)
	Total	0	0	0	0	0
Representative
Years	Team	Pld	T	G	FG	P
	West Coast
	South Island
1985	New Zealand	0	0	0	0	0

Glen Lyndley Gibb is a New Zealand former rugby league footballer who represented New Zealand.

== Playing career ==
Gibb played for Runanga in the West Coast Rugby League competition. He was a West Coast and South Island representative. In 1985 Gibb was selected for the New Zealand national rugby league team, however he did not play in a Test match.

In 1988 Gibb joined Cobden-Kohinoor and he later played for the Suburbs club.
