= Phil Bancroft =

New Zealand international rugby league footballer

Personal information
- Full name: Philip William Bancroft
- Born: 4 June 1964 (age 62) Canterbury, New Zealand

Playing information
- Position: Halfback
Club
Years	Team	Pld	T	G	FG	P
1985–86	Rochdale Hornets	19	4	13	0	42
1988–19??	Glenora Bears
1992	City-Pt Chev
1994	Canterbury Cardinals	8	2	3	0	14
	Total	27	6	16	0	56
Representative
Years	Team	Pld	T	G	FG	P
19??–1987	Canterbury
19??–87	South Island
1988–??	Auckland
1989	New Zealand	2	0	0	0	0

Philip William Bancroft is a New Zealand rugby league player who represented New Zealand in two Test matches in 1989.

== Playing career ==
A Canterbury and South Island representative in the 1980s, Bancroft played for the Glenora Bears in the Auckland Rugby League competition and also represented Auckland. In 1988, 1989 and 1990 Bancroft won the Painter Rosebowl Trophy for being the leading goalscorer in the competition.

Bancroft played for English Rugby League Club Rochdale Hornets in the 1985/86 season, enjoying a good season but narrowly missing out on promotion.

Bancroft was called up to the New Zealand national rugby league team during the 1989 tour of Great Britain and France and played in two test matches against Great Britain.

Bancroft later returned to Canterbury playing for the Halswell Hornets club and the Canterbury Country Cardinals in the 1994 Lion Red Cup.
