= Ross Taylor (rugby league) =

New Zealand rugby league footballer

Personal information
- Full name: Ross Henry Taylor
- Born: 4 January 1961 (age 65) New Zealand

Playing information
- Position: Prop
Club
| Years | Team | Pld | T | G | FG | P |
|---|---|---|---|---|---|---|
| 1987–88 | Hull Kingston Rovers | 17 | 2 | 0 | 0 | 8 |
| 19??–91 | Hornby |
| | Total | 17 | 2 | 0 | 0 | 8 |
Representative
| Years | Team | Pld | T | G | FG | P |
| 1983–88 | Canterbury |
| 1983–87 | South Island |
| 1985–87 | New Zealand | 2 | 0 | 0 | 0 | 0 |

Ross Henry Taylor (born 4 January 1961) is a New Zealand former rugby league footballer who represented New Zealand.

== Playing career ==
Taylor was a Junior Kiwi in 1976.

Taylor played for the Hornby club in the Canterbury Rugby League competition and was both a Canterbury and South Island representative. He first made the New Zealand national rugby league team in 1985, touring Great Britain until he broke his arm. In 1987 he made his Test debut, playing in two matches; against Papua New Guinea and Australia.
