= Mark Bourneville =

New Zealand rugby league footballer (born 1963)

Personal information
- Full name: Mark Trevor Bourneville
- Born: 30 June 1963 (age 63) Auckland, New Zealand

Playing information
- Position: Wing, Centre, Second-row
Club
Years	Team	Pld	T	G	FG	P
1982–89	Mount Albert Lions
1982–83	Leigh	8	2	0	0	6
1986	Swinton	3	1	0	0	4
	Villeneuve
1990	St. Helens	5	0	0	0	0
1991–94	Saint Estève
	Total	16	3	0	0	10
Representative
Years	Team	Pld	T	G	FG	P
1982–89	Auckland	3	1	0	0	4
1985	New Zealand	1
1993–94	France

Mark Trevor "Horse" Bourneville (born 30 June 1963) is a New Zealand former professional rugby league footballer. He represented both New Zealand and France in international rugby league and is the only dual-international the two countries share.

== Early years ==
After playing for the Mt Albert club from age 18, Bourneville was selected for Auckland that same year. He was involved in the 1984 Auckland Rugby League grand final which saw Mt Albert defeat Otahuhu for the Fox Memorial. During his time in New Zealand, Bourneville was plagued by injuries and suffered two broken arms, knee ligament damage and a broken jaw.

== Professional career ==
In a long professional career Bourneville played for Leigh, Swinton and St. Helens in England and for Villeneuve and AS Saint Estève in France. He was originally a winger but moved to the second row during his time in Europe.

After his retirement he moved back to New Zealand.

== Representative career ==
Bourneville was named in the 1985 New Zealand national rugby league team squad that toured Great Britain and France and played in one test match. He would have been selected again in 1986 but was unavailable due to injury.

In 1993 he represented France, playing for the French against the Kiwis in Carcassonne. During the match he broke his arm and was forced to consider retiring.

== Fight for life ==
Bourneville was a regular competitor in Dean Lonergan's Fight for Life charity boxing events and scored wins over rugby union footballers; Steve McDowall, Va'aiga Tuigamala and Lindsay Raki.

== Surf lifesaving ==
Bourneville is a surf lifesaver in Piha and competes in the national championships at the top level. This role has seen him appear on Piha Rescue.

The first Piha Big Wave Classic (Day of the Giants) was held at Piha Beach in April 2005 with 12 crews on the beach and Piha coming in second in the open men's race. These races, held annually are part of the national surf life saving championship surf boat series. In 2007 three crews came from Australia (Bronte, Jan Juc and Austinmer) to compete in these races. In 2014 Piha became the first club to win the trifecta at Piha - Mark HORSE Bourneville Swept 3 crews the Open Men's, Open Women's and Under 23 Men. The big wave classic was held at Piha on 21 February 2015.

In 2008 Piha crews comprising James Dallinger, Brad Mytton, Hayden Smith, Craig Knox, Matt Kirke, Mark Bourneville and Bruce O'Brien won the European Open Surf Boat Championships (also known as the World Surf Rowing Championships) at Biarritz, France. In 2012 Piha A crew won the Battle of the Ditch Surfboat Race (New Zealand versus Australia) and became the first crew to win the Australian Surf Life Saving men's open Australian Surf Rowers League title.

In 2013 Piha became the first club to win 5 Golds Surf boat Medals at a New Zealand National Surf Life Saving Championships, Mark HORSE Bourneville Swept 3 crews and won 2 x double titles and a gold & silver with U19 (Open Men long and short courses, Under 23 Men long and short courses and under 19 Men long course).

At the 2014 New Zealand Nationals Phia A became the first crew to win 8 New Zealand titles in 5 consecutive seasons. The 2014 Piha A crew was Paul Gerritsen, Chris Morris, Scott Lissington, Benjamin Richards, Ben Scott and sweep Mark Bourneville. The under 23 crew also scored a first - the first to win 5 New Zealand National titles in the under 23 division, the crew included Mark Bournevilles two twin sons Cedric & Ludovik Bourneville. The club also became the first to win 4 of the 6 divisional New Zealand Surf Boat Series titles - Men's Open, Women's Open, Under 23 Men's and Under 19 Women. The current Piha surf boats, sponsored by Burger Fuel and Trillion Trust, are named after previous Piha great boaties:- Tom Pearce, E D Wright, Buddy Lucas and Tiger O'Brien.

The Piha Boaties, during Mark 'HORSE' Bourneville's Boat captaincy, obtained the greatest decade in national titles;winning 25 titles over a 10-year period. Bourneville himself won 21 of the titles.

== Personal life ==
Bourneville's great grandfather and his wife are both French.
