= Clayton Friend =

New Zealand rugby league footballer

Personal information
- Full name: Clayton Ivan Friend
- Born: 22 March 1962 (age 63) Auckland, New Zealand

Playing information
- Position: Halfback
Club
| Years | Team | Pld | T | G | FG | P |
|---|---|---|---|---|---|---|
| | Manukau |
| 1982–84 | Carlisle | 23 | 2 |
| 1986–89 | North Sydney Bears | 68 | 8 | 1 | 2 | 36 |
| 1990–92 | Carlisle | 63 | 22 | 2 | 6 | 98 |
| 1992–95 | Whitehaven | 39 | 9 | 11 | 2 |
| 1996 | Counties Manukau | 17 | 8 | 0 | 0 | 32 |
| | Total | 210 | 49 | 14 | 10 | 166 |
Representative
| Years | Team | Pld | T | G | FG | P |
| | Auckland |
| 1982–91 | New Zealand | 24 | 7 | 0 | 0 | 27 |
| 1983–91 | New Zealand Māori |

Clayton Ivan Friend (born 1964) is a New Zealand former professional rugby league footballer who played in the 1980s and 1990s. He played at representative level for New Zealand, and at club level for Carlisle (two spells), North Sydney Bears and Whitehaven, as a scrum-half.

== Playing career ==
A Manukau junior and Auckland representative, Friend played for Carlisle in 1982 and then enjoyed a long spell with North Sydney. Cut by the Bears in 1990, he joined the Ryde-Eastwood team and, along with Olsen Filipaina, helped lead them to a Grand Final win in the Metropolitan Cup. At the end of the season he moved to England and returned to Carlisle. After a stint at Whitehaven between 1992 and 1995, Friend returned home and played for the Counties Manukau Heroes in the Lion Red Cup.

== International career ==
Friend toured with the 1982 and 1985 Kiwis and toured the United Kingdom in 1983 with the New Zealand Māori side.
