= Sam Stewart (rugby league) =

NZ international rugby league footballer (born 1962)

Personal information
- Full name: Samuel Weka Stewart
- Born: 5 December 1962 (age 63) Wellington, New Zealand

Playing information
- Position: Second-row
Club
Years	Team	Pld	T	G	FG	P
1981–87	Randwick
1988–93	Newcastle Knights	81	7	0	0	28
1993–95	London Crusaders	72	8	0	0	32
1995–97	Hull Kingston Rovers	20	1	0	0	4
	Total	173	16	0	0	64
Representative
Years	Team	Pld	T	G	FG	P
1981–87	Wellington	32
1984–87	Central Districts	4
1985–89	New Zealand	16	0	0	0	0
1986	NZ Māori
1988	Rest of the World	1	0	0	0	0

Samuel Weka Stewart (born 5 December 1962), also known by the nicknames of "Slammin' Sam" and "Wheka", is a New Zealand former professional rugby league footballer who represented New Zealand. He played for the Newcastle Knights when they first started competing in the New South Wales Rugby League premiership and became the Knights first captain.

== Playing career ==
Stewart was a Wellington Rugby League player for the Randwick club. He made his senior and Wellington debut's in 1981 and was a Junior Kiwi that same year. On the Junior Kiwis 1981 tour of Australia, Stewart signed a contract to play with the North Sydney Bears, however, later opted to instead pursue his career in the New Zealand Police. He was the New Zealand Police Triathlon champion in 1985 and was named the Police Sportsman of the year in 1987.

Stewart was named one of the Wellington Rugby League's players of the year in 1983. He toured Great Britain and France for the New Zealand Universities side. In 1984, Stewart was first selected for the Central Districts team. Stewart was part of Randwick's hat trick of Wellington Rugby League premierships between 1983 and 1985.

Stewart then crossed the Tasman, playing for the Newcastle Knights from 1988 until 1992 and captained their inaugural side. After 81 matches, Stewart was made the Knights first life member.

In 1993, Stewart travelled to England and joined the London Crusaders before spending time with Hull Kingston Rovers.

== Representative career ==
Stewart played for the Wellington and New Zealand Māori sides, captaining the Māori at the 1986 Pacific Cup.

Stewart played for the New Zealand national rugby league team from 1985 until 1989. He was first selected for the 1985 tour of Great Britain and France, playing in eleven games on tour. He also toured Australia and Papua New Guinea in 1986 and 1987 and competed in the 1988 World Cup. Before finishing his career in 1989 with tests against Australia and a tour of Great Britain and France. Stewart finished his career having played in sixteen test matches and forty games in total.

In 1988, he was chosen for the Rest of the World side in a match against Australia during their Bicentenary celebrations.

== Later years ==
Stewart is now based in Queensland where he did some scouting for the New Zealand Rugby League. In 2008, he participated in a bike ride from Burleigh to Bondi to raise money for prostate cancer.

== Legacy ==
In 2012, he was named in the Wellington Rugby League's Team of the Century.
