= Brent Todd =

New Zealand international rugby league footballer

Personal information
- Full name: Brent Trevor Todd
- Born: 5 December 1964 (age 61) New Zealand

Playing information
- Position: Prop
Club
Years	Team	Pld	T	G	FG	P
19??–86	Linwood (CRL)
1987–91	Canberra Raiders	91	0	0	0	0
1988–89	Wakefield Trinity	9	0	0	0	0
1992–93	Gold Coast Seagulls	34	1	1	0	6
	Total	134	1	1	0	6
Representative
Years	Team	Pld	T	G	FG	P
1985–86	Canterbury N.Z.
1985–86	South Island
1985–93	New Zealand	28	2	0	0	8
- Spouse: Wendy Botha (m. 1993; sep. 2005)

Brent Trevor Todd (born 5 December 1964) is a New Zealand former professional sportsman who has represented New Zealand at both rugby league football and water polo. His rugby league position was prop forward.

== Early years ==
Todd played in the New Zealand men's water polo team.

In 1982 he was invited to play for the New Zealand junior league team, the Junior Kiwis. He also played for the team in 1983.

== Playing career ==
Todd played for the Linwood club in the Canterbury Rugby League competition, and was a Canterbury representative. Todd played 28 tests for national team, the Kiwis, between 1985 and 1993.

Todd joined Australian team the Canberra Raiders in 1986, after a $37,200 transfer fee was paid. Todd played at prop forward for the Raiders in the Winfield Cup Grand Finals of 1987, 1989, 1990 and 1991. After suffering a broken arm in 1988, he spent the off-season with Wakefield Trinity, playing nine games. In 1992, Todd signed for the Gold Coast club. Todd caused laughter in his press conference when he replied to a question from a reporter asking why he signed for the Gold Coast. Todd replied “because the sheilas are good looking and I want to f*** them all”. Todd went on to make 34 appearances for the Gold Coast before retiring from the New South Wales Rugby League premiership in 1993. Later he became an Australian-based television commentator for league games.

== Personal life ==
Todd married former world surfing champion Wendy Botha in 1994 and they were married for 11 years. Todd's biography, League, Lies & Alibis was published the year he got married. In 2004, he appeared on reality show Celebrity Treasure Island with his then wife.

In December 2007 Todd was sentenced to 12 months' home detention for his role in a poker-machine fraud scheme.

== Sources ==
- Brent Todd at yesterdayshero.com.au
- Brent Todd profile at tvnz.co.nz
- Brent Todd at nrlstats.com
