= Tony Gordon (rugby) =

New Zealand rugby union footballer and coach, and rugby league footballer and coach

Personal information
- Full name: Anthony Ralph Gordon
- Born: 31 July 1948 Rotorua, Bay of Plenty, New Zealand
- Died: 25 March 2012 (aged 63)

Playing information

Rugby union
- Position: Fullback, Wing
Club
Years	Team	Pld	T	G	FG	P
1971–1974	King Country	44	9	101	1	302

Rugby league
- Position: Fullback, Wing
Club
Years	Team	Pld	T	G	FG	P
	Maritime
Representative
Years	Team	Pld	T	G	FG	P
	Bay of Plenty
1975	New Zealand	3	0	0	0	0

Coaching information
Club
Years	Team	Gms	W	D	L	W%
	Central (BOPRL)
1993–94	London Crusaders
1994–95	Hull FC
	Total	0	0	0	0
Representative
Years	Team	Gms	W	D	L	W%
19??–86	Bay of Plenty
	Northern Districts
1987–89	New Zealand	13	7	0	6	54
1991–92	Bay of Plenty

Anthony Ralph "Tank" Gordon (31 July 1948 – 25 March 2012) was a New Zealand rugby league and rugby union footballer and coach who represented the New Zealand Kiwis in the 1975 World Cup and coached them to the 1988 World Cup final. He was known for his strong kick

== Early years ==
Anthony was born in Rotorua. Later he would become a New Zealand Army PT Instructor. While in the army Gordon was the player-coach of the Wairau army and played rugby union for King Country.

== Playing career ==
Gordon then switched to rugby league in 1975 and joined the Maritime club in the Auckland Rugby League. He made the New Zealand national rugby league team after only 14 rugby league matches. He played in thirteen test matches for the Kiwis, including at the 1975 World Cup.

== Coaching career ==
After retirement Gordon turned his attention to coaching. He had a brief spell with Mangere East before he was convinced to become Central's head coach in the Bay of Plenty Rugby League competition. Gordan was met with immediate success, taking control of the Bay of Plenty and Northern Districts sides. In 1987 he became coach of the New Zealand national rugby league team. The Kiwis toured Australia and Papua New Guinea in 1987 and Gordon was involved in an upset win of Australia. The team couldn't repeat the feat in 1988 as they lost the final of the World Cup in front of 47,000 fans at Eden Park. The Kiwis toured Britain and France in 1989 before Gordon was replaced as Kiwis coach.

Gordon became coach of the London Crusaders in 1993 before joining Hull F.C. for the 1994–1995 season.

Halfway through the 1995 Lion Red Cup Neil Joyce resigned as the coach of the Bay of Plenty Stags. Gordon became a co-coach alongside Lawrence Brydon for the remainder of the season. In 1996 he remained with the Stags as the business Manager while Brydon became the head coach. During the season he was suspended and investigated by the New Zealand Rugby League over accusations of fraud. He was later cleared of all charges.

Between 1996 and 2001 he coached the Coastline Mariners.

== Later years ==
In 2006 Gordon was the coach of Kahukura in the Baywide rugby union competition. He died on 25 March 2012 after a long illness.
