= Riki Cowan =

New Zealand rugby league footballer

Personal information
- Full name: Areariki Arthur Cowan
- Born: 28 December 1963 (age 62) New Zealand

Playing information
- Position: Prop
Club
Years	Team	Pld	T	G	FG	P
	Mount Albert Lions
1992–93	St. Helens	4	0	0	0	0
1994	Wellington City	5	1	0	0	4
	Total	9	1	0	0	4
Representative
Years	Team	Pld	T	G	FG	P
	Auckland
	New Zealand Māori
1984–85	New Zealand	6	0	0	0	0
1986	Cook Islands
1990	Canterbury
1991–92	Wellington

Areariki Arthur Cowan "Riki" Cowan (born 28 December 1963) is a New Zealand rugby league footballer who represented New Zealand and the Cook Islands.

== Playing career ==
Cowan represented Auckland and the New Zealand Māori side before being selected to play for the New Zealand national rugby league team in 1984. He played in six test matches between 1984 and 1985. He toured the United Kingdom in 1983 with the New Zealand Māori side.

In 1986 he represented the Cook Islands at the Pacific Cup.

Cowan later represented the Wellington district and spent the 1992–93 season in England with St. Helens.
