= Shane Cooper (rugby league) =

Former NZ international rugby league footballer

Personal information
- Full name: Shane David Cooper
- Born: 26 May 1960 (age 66)

Playing information
- Position: Stand-off, Halfback, Loose forward
Club
Years	Team	Pld	T	G	FG	P
1965–86	Mt Albert Lions
1987–88	Mangere East
1987–95	St. Helens	271	76	0	6	310
1995–97	Widnes Vikings	63	16	0	1	1
	Total	334	92	0	7	311
Representative
Years	Team	Pld	T	G	FG	P
	Auckland
1985–89	New Zealand	12	0	0	1	1
1988	Rest of the World	1	0	0	0	0

Shane David Cooper (born 26 May 1960) is a New Zealand former rugby league footballer who played in the 1980s and 1990s. He represented New Zealand in the 1988 World Cup Final and had a long career in England with St. Helens and Widnes. Cooper is now a senior jogger at the Mt Albert Jogging and Walking Club & an active member of the Akarana Golf Club.

== Playing career ==
Playing for the Mt Albert Lions, Cooper won the Rothville Trophy, awarded to the Auckland Rugby League player of the year, in 1985.

In 1987 Cooper joined the St. Helens in England, transferring from Auckland's Mangere East club. He quickly became the captain of the side.

On 17 February 1988 Cooper scored six tries for St Helens in a match against Hull F.C.

At the end of the 1994-95 Rugby Football League season Cooper moved to the Widnes Vikings, playing three more seasons for them before retiring.

=== County Cup Final appearances ===
Shane Cooper played loose forward in St. Helens' 24–14 victory over Rochdale Hornets in the 1991 Lancashire Cup Final during the 1991–92 season at Wilderspool Stadium, Warrington, on Sunday 20 October 1991, and played loose forward in the 4–5 defeat by Wigan in the 1992 Lancashire Cup Final during the 1992–93 season at Knowsley Road, St. Helens, on Sunday 18 October 1992.

=== John Player Special Trophy Final appearances ===
Shane Cooper played stand-off in St. Helens' 15–14 victory over Leeds in the 1987–88 John Player Special Trophy Final during the 1987–88 season at Central Park, Wigan on Saturday 9 January 1988.

== Representative career ==
Cooper made his début for the New Zealand national rugby league team in 1985 and went on to play in twelve test matches, including the 1988 World Cup final loss to Australia at Eden Park. In this match Cooper started on the bench, a move later described as a mistake.

Cooper was also an Auckland representative and toured England with the Auckland side in 1987.
