= Wayne Wallace =

New Zealand rugby league footballer and coach

Personal information
- Full name: Wayne John Wallace

Playing information
- Height: 178 cm (5 ft 10 in)
- Weight: 87 kg (13 st 10 lb)
- Position: Hooker, Loose forward
Club
Years	Team	Pld	T	G	FG	P
19??–87	Hornby
1988	Marist-Western Suburbs
1989–??	Hornby
	Total	0	0	0	0	0
Representative
Years	Team	Pld	T	G	FG	P
1978–90	Canterbury	57
1981–??	South Island
1985–88	New Zealand	11	2	0	0	8
1988	Rest of the World	1	0	0	0	0

Coaching information
Club
Years	Team	Gms	W	D	L	W%
1990–??	Hornby
1994	Christchurch City	22	6	0	16	27
	Total	22	6	0	16	27

Wayne John Wallace is a New Zealand former rugby league footballer and coach who represented New Zealand in the 1988 World Cup final.

== Playing career ==
Wallace played in the Canterbury Rugby League club competition for Hornby, although he spent one season with the Marist-Western Suburbs team.

He first made the Canterbury side in 1979, initially as a Loose forward but he soon shifted to the Hooker position after an injury to Alan Rushton. He set a Canterbury record of 57 appearances between 1978 and 1990, leading the province to wins over Great Britain and Auckland in 1990.

Wallace made the New Zealand national rugby league team in 1985 and went on to play in eleven test matches. He was the only non-professional player in the 1988 World Cup final loss to Australia, his last game for New Zealand.

Wallace became player-coach of Hornby before retiring as a player to become a full-time coach.

== Coaching career ==
In 1994 Wallace coached the Christchurch City Shiners in their debut season in the Lion Red Cup.

Wallace's Hornby side won the 1997 Pat Smith Challenge Trophy, defeating Papanui. They won the Massetti Cup (minor premiership) the next year but could not defend the title.
