= Mark Elia =

Former NZ & (Western) Samoa international rugby league footballer

Personal information
- Full name: Mark Wycliffe Elia
- Born: 25 December 1962 (age 63) Auckland, New Zealand

Playing information
- Height: 1.83 m (6 ft 0 in)
- Weight: 92 kg (14 st 7 lb)
- Position: Fullback, Wing, Centre
Club
Years	Team	Pld	T	G	FG	P
1982–88	Te Atatu Roosters	50	41
1983–84	Kent Invicta	34	17	0	0	68
1984–85	Southend Invicta	17	15	0	0	60
1985–89	St. Helens	74	50	2	0	204
1989	Canterbury Bankstown	9	1	0	0	4
1990–91	Halifax	16	14	0	0	56
1994	Widnes	4	0	0	0	0
	RC Albi	14	8
1992–93	Northcote Tigers	34	20
1994–95	St. Helens	29	8	1	0	34
1996	Hawke's Bay	1	0	0	0	0
	Total	282	174	3	0	426
Representative
Years	Team	Pld	T	G	FG	P
1985–93	Auckland	30	18
1985–89	New Zealand	10	5	0	0	20
1995	Western Samoa	2	0	0	0	0

Coaching information
Club
Years	Team	Gms	W	D	L	W%
1996	Hawke's Bay	22	7	1	14	32

Mark Wycliffe Elia (born 25 December 1962) is a former professional rugby league footballer who represented both New Zealand and Western Samoa.

== Background ==
Elia was born in Auckland, New Zealand.

== Playing career ==
During his long career, Elia played for the Te Atatu Roosters, Northcote Tigers, Kent Invicta, Southend Invicta, St. Helens, Widnes, Halifax, the Canterbury Bulldogs and RC Albi in France.

=== John Player Special Trophy Final appearances ===
Mark Elia played at centre in St. Helens' 15-14 victory over Leeds in the 1987–88 John Player Special Trophy Final during the 1987–88 season at Central Park, Wigan on Saturday 9 January 1988.

== Representative career ==
Elia represented the New Zealand national rugby league team between 1985 and 1989, playing in ten tests and thirty seven games. He scored five test tries and thirty overall for the Kiwis.

In 1995 Elia represented Western Samoa at the World Cup.

== Cricket ==
During the 1990 season, Elia played cricket in the United States. During this period he umpired a friendly match that took place in America between Australia and Pakistan.

== Later years ==
In 1996 Elia coached the Hawkes Bay Unicorns in the Lion Red Cup.

He later retired to Cootamundra, New South Wales. He coached the Northcote Tigers in the 2015 Auckland Rugby League competition.
