= Marty Crequer =

New Zealand international rugby league footballer

Personal information
- Full name: Martin Paul Crequer
- Born: 28 June 1965 (age 61) New Zealand

Playing information
- Position: Fullback, Wing
Club
Years	Team	Pld	T	G	FG	P
19??–85	Hornby (CRL)
1986–??	Northcote Tigers
1990	Newcastle Knights	11	0	25	0	50
1991	Canterbury-Bankstown	3	0	7	0	14
1994	Christchurch City	12	6	21	0	66
1995	Canterbury Cardinals	1	0	0	0	0
	Total	27	6	53	0	130
Representative
Years	Team	Pld	T	G	FG	P
1983–85	Canterbury	12
1983–85	South Island	9
1983–86	New Zealand	3	1	0	0	4
1986–??	Auckland
19??–94	Canterbury
- Source: As of 16 January 2019

Martin (Marty) Paul Crequer (born 28 June 1965) is a New Zealand former rugby league footballer who represented New Zealand.

== Playing career ==
A Hornby junior in the Canterbury competition, Crequer was a Schoolboy Kiwi in 1979 and a Junior Kiwi in 1983. Crequer transferred to Auckland for the 1986 season, joining the Northcote Tigers.

Crequer then signed with the Canterbury Bulldogs, however he could not make the first grade side.

Crequer moved to the Newcastle Knights in 1990, finally breaking into first grade. In 1991 he transferred back to the Canterbury Bulldogs for a season. Crequer made his Canterbury run-on debut against St.George in round 8 scoring 5 goals at fullback & came on as a replacement in rounds 17 & 19 against Easts & Penrith respectively, scoring one goal in each game. After this he returned to play league in New Zealand.

Crequer played for the Christchurch City Shiners in the 1994 Lion Red Cup. He switched to the Canterbury Country Cardinals in 1995.

== Representative career ==
Crequer represented Canterbury and the South Island and was part of the 1993 Canterbury side that upset Auckland in the provincial final. He retired from provincial level after the 1994 Rugby League Cup defence against Auckland.

Crequer represented the New Zealand national rugby league team in 1983 and again from 1985 until 1986.
