= Adrian Shelford =

New Zealand rugby league footballer

Personal information
- Full name: Adrian Tremain Shelford
- Born: 4 January 1964 Christchurch, New Zealand
- Died: 19 September 2003 (aged 39) Wigan, Greater Manchester, England

Playing information
- Position: Prop, Second-row
Club
Years	Team	Pld	T	G	FG	P
19??–85	Hornby
1986–87	Upper Hutt
1987–90	Wigan	82	5	0	0	20
1988	Newcastle Knights	5	0	0	0	0
1990	Manly Sea Eagles	11	0	0	0	0
1990–92	Wakefield Trinity	36	2	0	0	8
1992	Sheffield Eagles	4
	Total	138	7	0	0	28
Representative
Years	Team	Pld	T	G	FG	P
1984–85	Canterbury	11
1984–85	South Island	5
1986–87	Wellington	10
1986–87	Central Districts
1986	New Zealand Māori
1986–89	New Zealand	8	1	0	0	4
1988	Rest of the World	1	0	0	0	0
- Relatives: Kyle Shelford (son); Buck Shelford (cousin); Darrel Shelford (cousin)

Adrian Tremain Shelford (4 January 1964 – 19 September 2003) was a New Zealand rugby league footballer who played in the 1980s and 1990s. He played at representative level for New Zealand, and at club level for Wigan and Wakefield Trinity in the Championship as well as the Newcastle Knights and Manly Sea Eagles in the NSWRL Premiership, as a prop.

== Background ==
Shelford was born in Christchurch, New Zealand.

== Early years ==
Shelford played for Hornby and Canterbury before moving to Wellington to advance his career. He was named the Canterbury Rugby League Player of the Year in 1984. He made the Junior Kiwis in 1982 and 1983.

In 1986, Shelford joined the Wellington-based Upper Hutt Tigers.

== Professional career ==
Shelford moved to England in 1987 with both St Helens R.F.C. and Wigan claiming to have secured his signature. Shelford eventually joined Wigan after it was ruled by the High Court that he had not entered into a binding commitment to play for Saints. He appeared in 21 matches for Wigan and was part of the Challenge Cup winning side that beat Halifax 32–12 before 94,273 spectators at Wembley Stadium.

After a short stint with the Newcastle Knights during the 1988 season, he was back at Wigan. He played in 40 games during the 1988–89 season, the most matches by any player at the club. Shelford featured in the Challenge Cup Final win over St. Helens by 27–0 in front of a crowd of 78,000 spectators. Shelford played at prop and scored a try in Wigan's 22–17 victory over Salford in the 1988 Lancashire Cup Final during the 1988–89 season at Knowsley Road on Sunday 23 October 1988.

Shelford played at prop (replaced by interchange/substitute Andy Goodway on 20-minutes) in Wigan's 12-6 victory over Widnes in the 1988–89 John Player Special Trophy Final during the 1988–89 season at Burnden Park, Bolton on Saturday 7 January 1989.

Shelford played 22 matches for the Wigan club in the 1989/90 season, and was back again at Wembley Stadium to help Wigan to a win over Warrington. "He was someone that would do the hard yards and lay the platform for the backs," said former team-mate Kevin Iro. Shelford had a stint with Manly in the Australian competition in 1990, appearing in 11 matches, with most of those coming off the bench.

Shelford headed over to Wakefield Trinity during the 1990–91 season, playing 28 games. Shelford played at prop in Wakefield Trinity's 8–11 defeat by Castleford in the 1990 Yorkshire Cup Final during the 1990–91 season at Elland Road on Sunday 23 September 1990. He was involved in eight games in 1991–92 season with Wakefield Trinity before finishing the season with four games for the Sheffield Eagles.

== Representative career ==
Shelford represented the New Zealand Under 17's in 1981 and was a Junior Kiwi the following year while playing for Christchurch club Hornby. In 1984, his first full senior year, he made his début for South Island. He played 11 provincial games for Canterbury before being chosen to tour Great Britain and France with the New Zealand national rugby league team in 1985. He was involved in 11 games on that tour but did not feature in any of the Test matches.

He moved to Wellington club Upper Hutt in 1986 and went on to represent the district in 10 provincial matches between 1986 and 1987. He represented the New Zealand Māori in the 1986 Pacific Cup.

He made his Test début in 1987 against Papua New Guinea at Goroka and Port Moresby before taking on the Australians in 1987 in which the Kiwis scored a famous 13–6 win over the world champions at Lang Park.

“We were confident of beating the Aussies. We have a side that I believe is the best in the world, which is good for the game in New Zealand," Shelford said at the time.

He played just four games, including one test, on the 1989 tour of Great Britain before being injured. Overall, he appeared in eight test matches as well as representing the Rest of the World in 1988 against Australia at the Sydney Football Stadium.

== Personal life ==
Shelford's league career was ended by a knee injury at the age of 27.

Shelford planned for life after rugby league by graduating with honours from Edge Hill University. He was teaching at a local high school in Wigan, England and had just gained promotion when he died on 19 September 2003 of a heart attack, aged 39.

Shelford's cousin Buck Shelford played rugby union for the All Blacks. His son Kyle Shelford made his début for Wigan Warriors against the Wakefield Trinity Wildcats on Friday 8 July 2016 and his eldest son Dane Shelford represented Junior All Blacks at the 2015 under 19 Rugby World Championship in South Africa.
