= Owen Wright (rugby league) =

New Zealand international rugby league footballer and coach

Personal information
- Full name: Owen Grant Wright
- Born: 15 January 1957 (age 69) New Zealand

Playing information
- Position: Second-row
Club
Years	Team	Pld	T	G	FG	P
	Otahuhu
	Manukau
	Total	0	0	0	0	0
Representative
Years	Team	Pld	T	G	FG	P
1978–86	Auckland	42
1982–86	New Zealand	16	1	0	0	4
1983–86	New Zealand Māori

Coaching information
Representative
Years	Team	Gms	W	D	L	W%
1991–93	Auckland

Owen Grant Wright is a New Zealand former professional rugby league footballer who represented New Zealand in sixteen Tests, including in matches that counted towards the 1988 World Cup.

His brother Nick also represented New Zealand while his father Owen and his uncles Jack and Joe all represented the New Zealand Māori side.

== Playing career ==
Wright was an Otahuhu Leopards player in the Auckland Rugby League competition. He won several trophies while at Otahuhu, including both the Lipscombe Cup for sportsman of the year and Rothville Trophy for player of the year in 1984.

In 1974 Wright was an Under-17 and Under-19 Auckland representative. He played for the Under-21s in 1975 before making his senior debut for Auckland in 1978.

Wright represented the New Zealand Māori team, including touring Great Britain and at the 1986 Pacific Cup.

Wright remained in Auckland despite having offers from professional clubs in England and Australia. In 1986 he played for the Manukau Magpies club.

== Coaching career ==
Between 1991 and 1993 Wright coached Auckland in the national provincial competition.

== Later years ==
Wright now works in radio. He has commentated on New Zealand Warriors matches for Radio Sport since 1995.
