= James Goulding =

New Zealand international rugby league footballer

Personal information
- Full name: James Wayne Goulding
- Born: 27 March 1966 (age 59) New Zealand

Playing information
- Position: Prop, Second-row
Club
Years	Team	Pld	T	G	FG	P
19??	Richmond
1988–90	Newcastle Knights	29	0	0	0	0
1990–91	Hull Kingston Rovers	22	3	0	0	12
1995	Western Reds	1	0	0	0	0
	Total	52	3	0	0	12
Representative
Years	Team	Pld	T	G	FG	P
19??	Auckland
1985–89	New Zealand	5	1	0	0	5
1993	Wellington
- Source: As of 4 February 2019

James Wayne Goulding is a New Zealand former rugby league footballer who represented New Zealand five times.

== Playing career ==
A Richmond Bulldogs player in the Auckland Rugby League competition, Goulding won the Bert Humphries Memorial Medal in 1985 for the most improved forward.

In 1988 he joined the new Newcastle Knights franchise in the New South Wales Rugby League premiership and played for the Knights for three seasons.

In 1995 he joined the new Western Reds franchise, but only played one game for the new club.

== Representative career ==
An Auckland representative, Goulding also represented New Zealand from 1985 until 1989 - playing in five matches for the New Zealand national rugby league team.

He spent the 1993 season with the Wellington side, coming in as a replacement for John Lomax who signed with the Canberra Raiders before the season began.
