= Hugh McGahan =

New Zealand international rugby league footballer and coach

Hugh McGahan MBE
- Born: Hugh Joseph McGahan; 15 November 1961 (age 65); Auckland, New Zealand
- Relatives: Matt McGahan (son)
- Rugby league career

Playing information
- Position: Lock
Club
Years	Team	Pld	T	G	FG	P
	Otahuhu
1985–91	Eastern Suburbs	117	20	0	0	80
	Total	117	20	0	0	80
Representative
Years	Team	Pld	T	G	FG	P
	Auckland
	New Zealand Māori
1982–90	New Zealand	32	16	0	1	63

Coaching information
Club
Years	Team	Gms	W	D	L	W%
1990	Eastern Suburbs	22	6	1	15	27

Hugh Joseph McGahan MBE (born 15 November 1961) is a New Zealand former professional rugby league footballer, and coach who represented New Zealand. He retired as the New Zealand national team's all-time top try scorer, with 16. Since retirement McGahan has worked as a rugby league newspaper columnist and a football manager.

His son, Matt McGahan, is a rugby union professional.

== Playing career ==
Educated at St Peter's College, Auckland, the tall Māori backrower of Ngāi Tūhoe descent was an Otahuhu Leopards junior and played in the Auckland Rugby League competition under coach Graham Lowe. He later moved to Sydney to play for Australian club Eastern suburbs from 1985. In 1987 the Roosters captain was named the Dally M backrower of the year. The following year McGahan was co-recipient of the Adidas Golden Boot Award with Peter Sterling. In his final season with the Roosters McGahan took over as captain-coach following the dismissal of Russell Fairfax. He played in over 100 matches for the club from 1985 until his retirement at the end of the 1991 season. Following his retirement from the club, McGahn was a director of both East's the leagues and football club.

== Representative career ==
McGahan represented New Zealand in 53 tests. He was the captain in 17 of those test matches. He once scored 6 tries in a test match against Papua New Guinea.

He toured the United Kingdom in 1983 with the New Zealand Māori side.

In 1987, McGahan jointly won the prestigious Golden Boot award along with Parramatta Eels and Australian Halfback Peter Sterling. The award is given to the player judged to be the best international footballer of the year. As of 2013 McGahan is the only second row forward, and one of only two forwards (Melbourne Storm Hooker Cameron Smith in 2007 being the other), to have won the Golden Boot.

== Later years ==
In the 1991 New Year Honours, McGahan was appointed a Member of the Order of the British Empire, for services to rugby league. In 1990, he served as caretaker coach of the Eastern Suburbs Roosters. In 1995 he was one of the initial inductees of the NZRL's Legends of League.

McGahan went on to sports management roles in the United Kingdom and back home in New Zealand and successfully built his own management company, which he still runs today. In 1999 he was the Auckland Warriors football manager.

In 2006 McGahan coached the Waitemata rugby union club. The side made the Auckland Rugby Union grand final.

== Controversy ==
On 5 November 2007, McGahan and former All Black Doug Rollerson, appeared in the Auckland District Court on charges of alleged fraud. A small group used an elaborate scheme of invoices and accounts to defraud sports organisations out of charity money. The group was accused of supplying Touch New Zealand, the North Harbour Rugby Union and Team Harbour Limited with false invoices. McGahan pleaded guilty and in May 2009 he was sentenced to 270 hours of community service.
