= Graham Lowe =

New Zealand rugby league footballer, coach and administrator

Sir Graham Lowe KNZM QSM
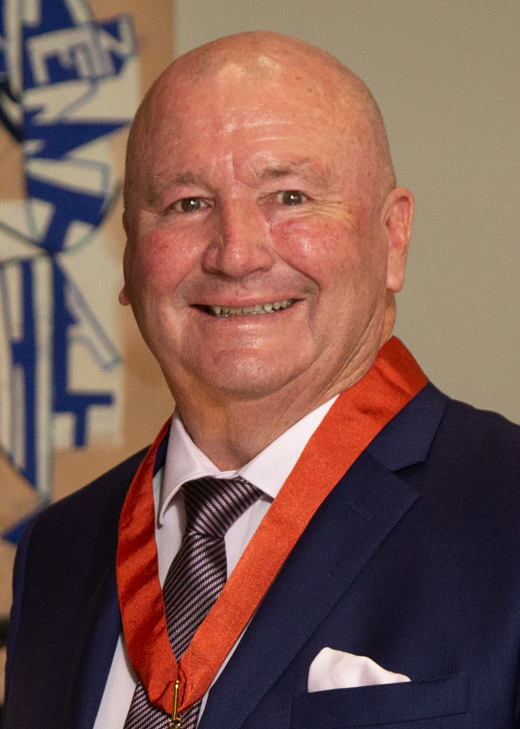
- Lowe in 2019

Personal information
- Full name: Graham Michael Lowe
- Born: 2 October 1946 (age 79) New Zealand
- Rugby league career

Playing information
Club
Years	Team	Pld	T	G	FG	P
	Otahuhu

Coaching information
Club
Years	Team	Gms	W	D	L	W%
1973–78	Otahuhu
1979–82	Northern Suburbs	80	38	0	42	48
1986–89	Wigan	128	104	3	21	81
1990–92	Manly-Warringah	70	40	3	27	57
1996	North Qld Cowboys	21	6	0	15	29
	Total	299	188	6	105	63
Representative
Years	Team	Gms	W	D	L	W%
1983–86	New Zealand	17	10	0	7	59
1988	Rest of the World	1	0	0	1	0
1991–92	Queensland	6	3	0	3	50
1995	Western Samoa	2	1	0	1	50

Sir Graham Michael Lowe KNZM QSM is the owner of the Bradford Bulls together with fellow New Zealander Andrew Chalmers. He is a New Zealand former rugby league football coach and administrator. He previously coached in Australia and England and was the CEO of the Manly-Warringah Sea Eagles. He is also the only non-Australian to coach a State of Origin team.

== Playing career ==
Lowe was an Otahuhu Leopards junior and played in their premier side before he retired early due to injury.

== Coaching career ==
=== 1970s ===
Lowe had begun coaching the Otahuhu under 18s in 1974 before becoming a first grade coach in 1977 at Otahuhu. The club won the Fox Memorial in his first year as coach. In 1979 he moved to the Brisbane club competition, coaching Northern Suburbs.

=== 1980s ===
In 1980 Lowe took the Norths club to the Brisbane Rugby League grand final, which they won. He coached Norths until the end of the 1982 season, his last game being against the Arthur Beetson-coached Redcliffe Dolphins at Dolphin Oval. In 1983, Lowe was appointed coach of New Zealand. He relinquished the Kiwis role in 1985, but returned to coach them in 1985 and 1986. Under his coaching the Kiwis won two games (including New Zealand's first win over Australia in twelve years at Lang Park in 1983) and lost five, mostly to the powerful Wally Lewis-led Australians (New Zealand lost all three tests of the 1986 Trans-Tasman Tests).

In 1986, he moved to Britain's Rugby Football League competition, where he coached English club Wigan. Wigan had been bereft of success for 27 years. However, under Lowe's coaching, Wigan re-emerged to be a power in the British game. It was while Lowe was coaching that Wigan were able to secure the signatures of Great Britain players Ellery Hanley and Andy Gregory. Lowe was the coach in Wigan's 15–8 victory over Oldham in the 1986 Lancashire Cup Final during the 1986–87 season at Knowsley Road, St. Helens, on Sunday 19 October 1986, in the 28–16 victory over Warrington in the 1987 Lancashire Cup Final during the 1987–88 season at Knowsley Road on Sunday 11 October 1987, and in the 22–17 victory over Salford in the 1988 Lancashire Cup Final during the 1988–89 season at Knowsley Road on Sunday 23 October 1988. Lowe led Wigan to their first Championship in 27-years during the 1986–87 season, and went on to guide Wigan to their 1987 World Club Challenge victory over Manly-Warringah Sea Eagles, the English club's first ever WCC title. He also led Wigan to success in both the 1988 and 1989 Challenge Cup finals.

=== 1990s ===
Moving back to Australia, Lowe coached the team he had beaten in the 1987 WCC, Manly-Warringah, between 1990 and 1992. He was successful in bringing the Sea Eagles back to the finals in 1990 and 1991. During 1991, Lowe was appointed coach of the Queensland Maroons State of Origin team, becoming the first and so far only non-Australian to coach in the rugby league showpiece. After being appointed Maroons coach Lowe suffered from health problems when a blood clot in his leg threatened to end not only his coaching career but his life. He recovered in time to lead Queensland to a 2–1 victory over NSW in the 1991 State of Origin series. He was re-appointed for the 1992 series but Qld went down to the Phil Gould-coached Blues two games to one.

Graham Lowe also coached the Western Samoan side for the 1995 Rugby League World Cup.

In 1996, Lowe coached the North Queensland Cowboys on a one-year contract before stepping aside for Tim Sheens.

In the late 1990s he was a part owner of the Auckland Warriors.

=== 2000s ===
In 2008 Lowe coached in New Zealand with the Bay of Plenty Stags of the National Provincial Competition.

== Administration career ==
On 25 November 2009, Lowe was appointed the chief executive officer of Manly Sea Eagles. He stood down from this position in April 2011 due to health issues.

In the 2016 Auckland local elections, Lowe contested the Albany ward of the Auckland Council for Auckland Future. He came fourth, missing out on one of two council positions.

In January 2017, the previously liquidated Bradford Bulls was under the control of Lowe. His first move at the club was to remove then-current coach Rohan Smith with replaced by former Manly Sea Eagles coach Geoff Toovey. The announcement of the replacement was followed by the signing of the Samoa Rugby Union Sevens sensation Phoenix Hunapo-Nofoa.

== Honours ==
In the 1986 New Year Honours, Lowe was awarded the Queen's Service Medal for community service.

In the 2013 New Year Honours, Lowe was appointed an Officer of the New Zealand Order of Merit for services to the community. In the 2019 Queen's Birthday Honours, he was promoted to Knight Companion of the New Zealand Order of Merit, for services to youth and education.

Awards
Preceded by Ron Cheatley	Halberg Awards – Coach of the Year; 1991	Succeeded by Duncan Laing
