= 1974 Great Britain Lions tour =

- Date: 26 May 1974 – 13 August 1974
- Manager: Reg Parker
- Coach(es): Jim Challinor
- Tour captain(s): Chris Hesketh
- Top point scorer(s): John Gray (111)
- Top try scorer(s): David Redfearn (18)
Summary
P	W	D	L
Total
28	21	0	7
Test match
6	3	0	3
Opponent
P	W	D	L
Australia
3	1	0	2
New Zealand
3	2	0	1

Tour chronology
- Previous tour: 1970
- Next tour: 1979

The 1974 Great Britain Lions tour was the Great Britain national rugby league team's 15th tour of Australasia and took place from May to August 1974. A total of 28 matches were played against local club and representative sides during the tour, including a three match Test match series against Australia and New Zealand respectively.

== Touring squad ==
In March 1974, a 26-man squad was selected for the tour, with Chris Hesketh appointed as captain.

After the squad was selected, Keith Fielding withdrew from the tour as his wife was expecting a baby in June. He was replaced by John Butler. Mike Nicholas was also forced to withdraw due to injuries sustained in the 1974 Challenge Cup final, and was replaced by Jimmy Thompson.

Bill Ramsey and Maurice Richards were called up to replace injured players during the tour.

During an injury crisis while in New Zealand, tour coach Jim Challinor was forced to come out of retirement just 6 days after turning 40. Although he scored a try in the game against South Island in Greymouth, he suffered an injury during the game that would ultimately result in the loss of a kidney.

Forward John Gray would cause a sensation in Australia and New Zealand with his goal kicking. To that point in rugby league's history, goal kicking was generally the, now known to be less accurate, front-on toe poking style of kick. Gray was the first around the corner kicker seen in Australia. He explained that it was easy to do as it was no different to kicking a soccer ball. Despite being more accurate, the style which is the standard in 2024 took its time to take hold in Australia and although there were around the corner kickers like Ross Conlon and dual rugby international Michael O'Connor in the 1980s, the style didn't really take off until the 1990s thanks to the accuracy of New Zealand kickers such as Matthew Ridge and Daryl Halligan as well as top line Rugby Union kickers such as Grant Fox (All Blacks) and Michael Lynagh (Australia). Gray would go on to play for both North Sydney and Manly-Warringah in the Sydney Premiership during the mid-late 1970s.

* (as sub) and Tests not included in Appearances

Name	Position(s)	Club	Appearances (as sub)	Tests (as sub)	Tries	Goals	Drop goals	Points	Notes
Kevin Ashcroft	Hooker	Warrington	13 (1)	(1)	2	0	0	6	
John Atkinson	Wing	Leeds	8	–	8	0	0	24	
Alan Bates	Scrum-half, Loose forward	Dewsbury	18	(3)	2	0	0	6	
John Bates	Second-row	Dewsbury	2 (3)	–	0	0	0	0	
John Bevan	Wing, Centre, Fullback	Warrington	12 (1)	4	15	0	0	45	
Keith Bridges	Hooker, Prop	Featherstone Rovers	6 (2)	1	0	0	0	0	
John Butler	Utility	Rochdale	14 (3)	–	6	0	0	18	
Jim Challinor	Centre	St Helens	1	–	1	0	0	3	
Paul Charlton	Fullback	Salford	10 (1)	6	4	0	0	12	
Eric Chisnall	Second-row, Prop, Hooker	St Helens	13 (1)	4	3	0	0	9	
Terry Clawson	Prop	Oldham	9	4	0	24	0	48	
Colin Dixon	Utility	Salford	11 (2)	6	4	0	0	12	
Les Dyl	Centre, Wing	Leeds	12	5	14	0	0	42	
David Eckersley	Fullback, Centre	St Helens	11 (1)	1 (1)	3	12	0	33	
Ken Gill	Stand-off, Centre	Salford	11 (2)	3	8	0	0	24	
John Gray	Prop, Second-row, Hooker	Wigan	10 (1)	5 (1)	2	52	1	111	
Chris Hesketh (c)	Centre, Stand-off	Salford	10 (4)	6	4	0	0	12	
Jim Mills	Prop	Widnes	12 (1)	3	2	0	0	6	
Roger Millward	Utility	Hull Kingston Rovers	8 (1)	2 (1)	8	18	0	60	
Steve Nash	Scrum-half	Featherstone Rovers	8 (2)	6	5	0	1	16	
George Nicholls	Loose forward, Second-row	St Helens	12	6	4	0	0	12	
Steve Norton	Loose forward, Second-row	Castleford	12 (2)	2 (1)	5	0	0	15	
Bill Ramsey	Prop, Hooker, Second-row	Bradford Northern	5 (1)	(1)	2	5	0	16	
David Redfearn	Wing, Centre	Bradford Northern	13	4	17	2	0	55	
Maurice Richards	Wing, Fullback	Salford	8	2	6	0	0	18	
Paul Rose	Second-row, Loose forward, Prop	Hull Kingston Rovers	11 (1)	(1)	5	0	0	15	
Jimmy Thompson	Second-row, Prop, Hooker	Featherstone Rovers	13 (2)	6	1	0	0	3	
David Watkins	Centre, Fullback	Salford	5 (2)	1	2	12	0	30	
David Willicombe	Centre, Wing, Fullback	Halifax	11 (3)	1	8	0	0	24	

== Results ==
=== Australia ===
26 May 1974

Darwin	2 – 41	Great Britain Lions
Goals: Lionel Tewes (1)	Report	Tries: John Atkinson (3), Steve Nash (2), David Redfearn (2), Paul Charlton, Roger Millward, George Nicholls, David Watkins; Goals: Terry Clawson (3); David Watkins (1)

Richardson Park, Darwin
Attendance: 6,500

Darwin Firsts: Evan Hooper, Bruce Spencer, Glen Birch, Warwick Carroll, Des Williams, John Grunnett, Lionel Tewes, Jim Lund, Rod Connelly, Dennis Denmeade, Huri Tukukino, Kerry Gardiner, Dennis Postens. Reserves – Eddie Fry, Dennis McDowell, Noel Theodore, Kevin Jurek. Coach – Ron Nobbs

Great Britain: Paul Charlton, David Redfearn, David Watkins, Chris Hesketh (c), John Atkinson, Ken Gill, Steve Nash, Terry Clawson, Keith Bridges, Jim Mills, Paul Rose, Colin Dixon, George Nicholls. Reserves – Roger Millward, Alan Bates, John Butler, John Gray

30 May 1974

North Queensland	5 – 30	Great Britain Lions
Tries: Ron Workman; Goals: Frank Daisy (1)	Report	Tries: Kevin Ashcroft, John Atkinson, Colin Dixon, Les Dyl, David Watkins, David Willicombe; Goals: Terry Clawson (6)

Cairns Showgrounds, Cairns
Attendance: 7,588
Referee: Nick Euclid

North Queensland: Frank Daisy, Doug Muir, Doug Millican, Wayne Bullock, Somerville, G. Bevan, Cowell, D. Whiting, Ron Workman (c), Laurie Irvin, Shields, Peter Luppi, Wilson. Reserves – Wooley. Coach –

Great Britain: David Eckersley, John Atkinson, Les Dyl, David Willicombe, John Bevan, John Butler, Alan Bates, Terry Clawson, Kevin Ashcroft, John Gray, Eric Chisnall, Colin Dixon, Steve Norton. Reserves – Chris Hesketh (c), David Watkins, Jimmy Thompson, John Bates

2 June 1974

Central Queensland	0 – 38	Great Britain Lions
	Report	Tries: John Bevan (2), Les Dyl (2), David Willicombe (2), Chris Hesketh, Paul Rose; Goals: Terry Clawson (5/7); David Eckersley (2)

Rockhampton Showgrounds, Rockhampton
Attendance: 12,000
Referee: Peter Goener

Central Queensland: John Pollock, Les Williams, John Paap, Ron Milne, Morgan, Alan Hardisty (c), Clayton Dunman, Col McCullum, Rob Harris, Tony Arnold, Mike Pannowitz, Rob Kerr, Tony Perkins,. Reserves – Anthony Hall. Coach –

Great Britain: David Eckersley, Les Dyl, David Willicombe, Chris Hesketh (c), John Bevan, Ken Gill, Steve Nash, Terry Clawson, Keith Bridges, Eric Chisnall, Jimmy Thompson, Paul Rose, George Nicholls. Reserves – Jim Mills

4 June 1974

Wide Bay	12 – 24	Great Britain Lions
Tries: Kevin Harkin, Greg Heading; Goals: Noel Cavanagh (3)	Report	Tries: David Redfearn (2), Paul Charlton, Colin Dixon; Goals: David Watkins (6/7)

Eskdale Park, Maryborough
Attendance: 3,200
Referee: Sid Volling

Wide Bay: Bangle, Greg Heading, Irvine, Philip Braithwaite, Liam Duggan, Ward, Stephenson, Gary Pearson, Kevin Poulter, Noel Cavanagh (c), Tom Duggan, Doug Plastow, Kim McKenna. Reserves – Des Smith, Frank Paulger, Kevin Harkin, Deepler. Coach –

Great Britain: Paul Charlton, David Redfearn, David Watkins (c), David Willicombe, John Bevan, Roger Millward, Alan Bates, Jim Mills, Kevin Ashcroft, John Gray, Jimmy Thompson, Colin Dixon, Steve Norton. Reserves – John Butler, Eric Chisnall

6 June 1974

Ipswich Firsts	8 – 36	Great Britain Lions
Tries: Peter Hyland (2); Goals: Len Chemello (1)	Report	Tries: John Atkinson (2), Les Dyl (2), John Butler, George Nicholls, Paul Rose, David Willicombe; Goals: John Gray (4/6); David Eckersley (2)

Ipswich Showgrounds, Ipswich
Attendance: 3,778
Referee: Ted Barrett

Ipswich Firsts: Brian Sheraton, Mike Green, John White (c), Richard Wilkie, Alan Coles, Brian Scott, Ross O'May, Peter Simpson, Peter Hyland, Daryl Harrower, Ian Hoffman, John Smith, Tom Browne. Reserves – Len Chemello, Raven. Coach –

Great Britain: David Eckersley, Les Dyl, Chris Hesketh (c), John Butler, John Atkinson, Ken Gill, Alan Bates, John Gray, Keith Bridges, Paul Rose, John Bates, Eric Chisnall, George Nicholls. Reserves – David Willicombe, Steve Norton

9 June 1974

Queensland Firsts	12 – 13	Great Britain Lions
Tries: Ross Strudwick; Goals: Ian Pearce (4); Drop goals: Ross Strudwick (1)	Report	Tries: John Bevan, Colin Dixon; Goals: David Watkins (2); Terry Clawson (1); Drop goals: Steve Nash (1)

Lang Park, Brisbane
Attendance: 26,000
Referee: Don Lancashire

Queensland: Ian Pearce, Warren Orr, Peter Leis, Gerard Fitzpatrick, Harry Pickering, Geoff Richardson, Ross Strudwick, John Crilly, John Lang, Greg Veivers (c), David Wright, Ray Higgs, Rod Halley. Reserves – Lew Platz. Coach – Barry Muir

Great Britain: Paul Charlton, John Atkinson, David Watkins, Chris Hesketh (c), John Bevan, Roger Millward, Steve Nash, Jim Mills, Keith Bridges, Terry Clawson, Colin Dixon, Jimmy Thompson, George Nicholls. Reserves – Paul Rose

==== First Test ====
15 June 1974

Australia	12 – 6	Great Britain
Tries: Warren Orr; Goals: Graeme Langlands (4)		Goals: Terry Clawson (2); David Watkins (1)

Lang Park, Brisbane
Attendance: 30,280
Referee: Don Lancashire (Australia)

Australia	Position	Great Britain
Graeme Langlands (c)	FB	Paul Charlton
David Waite	WG	David Redfearn
Bob Fulton	CE	David Watkins
Michael Cronin	CE	Chris Hesketh (c)
Warren Orr	WG	John Bevan
Geoff Richardson	FE/SO	Roger Millward
Tom Raudonikis	HB/SH	Steve Nash
Bob O'Reilly	PR	Terry Clawson
Elwyn Walters	HK	Keith Bridges
Arthur Beetson	PR	Jim Mills
Ray Higgs	SR	Jimmy Thompson
Paul Sait	SR	Colin Dixon
Ron Coote	LK/LF	George Nicholls
	Int.	David Eckersley
	Int.	John Gray
Graeme Langlands	Coach	Jim Challinor

16 June 1974

Toowoomba	16 – 42	Great Britain Lions
Tries: Russell Bliss, Dan Delaney; Goals: Wayne Lindenberg (5/6)	Report	Tries: Les Dyl (4), David Eckersley (2), John Atkinson, John Gray; Goals: John Gray (9/10)

Athletic Oval, Toowoomba
Attendance: 4,160
Referee: G. Blair

Toowoomba: Pat McCarthy (c), Russell Bliss, Terry Arnold, Alan Smith, Greg Scholl, Tyran Andrews, Wayne Lindenberg, Tony Brunner, Dan Delaney, Bob Coster, Steve McCosker, Greg Platz, Graham McCulloch. Reserves – Ron Lindenberg, Rohan Hancock. Coach –

Great Britain: David Eckersley, John Atkinson, Les Dyl, David Willicombe, John Bevan, Ken Gill, Alan Bates, John Gray, Kevin Ashcroft, Eric Chisnall, John Bates, Paul Rose, John Butler. Reserves –

18 June 1974

Brisbane Firsts	20 – 15	Great Britain Lions
Tries: Gerard Fitzpatrick (2), Wayne Bennett, Ian Thinee; Goals: Ian Dauth (4)	Report	Tries: Eric Chisnall, David Eckersley, John Gray; Goals: David Watkins (2); John Gray (1)

Brisbane Exhibition Grounds, Brisbane
Attendance: 7,880
Referee: Henry Albert

Brisbane Firsts: Wayne Bennett, Warren Orr, Gerard Fitzpatrick, Eric Lilley, Ian Dauth, Geoff Richardson, Tony White, Greg Veivers (c), John Lang, Russell Hughes, David Wright, Ian Thinee, Jeff Fyfe. Reserves – Hugh O'Doherty, Graeme Atherton. Coach – Henry Holloway

Great Britain: Paul Charlton, John Atkinson, Chris Hesketh (c), David Watkins, Les Dyl, Ken Gill, Steve Nash, John Gray, Kevin Ashcroft, Colin Dixon, George Nicholls, Eric Chisnall, Paul Rose. Reserves – David Eckersley, Steve Norton

20 June 1974

NSW North Coast	9 – 19	Great Britain Lions
Tries: Mick Ryan; Goals: John Kelly (3)	Report	Tries: John Bevan (2), John Atkinson, Jim Mills, Paul Rose; Goals: Terry Clawson (1); David Eckersley (1)

McKittrick Park, Grafton
Attendance: 3,460
Referee: Tom Gustard

North Coast: Michael Ross, Mark Hogan, Mick Ryan, Dick Ensby, Des Anderson, Bob McDermott, John Kelly, Ken Johnston, Errol Ruprecht, Ray Webb, Danny Morton, Steve Hage, Barry Bryant (c). Reserves – Barry Morrison, Warren Thompson. Coach – Ron Boden

Great Britain: David Eckersley, John Atkinson, David Willicombe, Les Dyl, John Bevan, John Butler, Alan Bates, Terry Clawson, Kevin Ashcroft, Jim Mills, Jimmy Thompson, Paul Rose, George Nicholls. Reserves – John Bates

23 June 1974

North Division NSW	14 – 38	Great Britain Lions
Tries: Ray Lanesbury, Ken Orr; Goals: Phil Harris (4)	Report	Tries: Paul Charlton (2), Eric Chisnall, Chris Hesketh, Roger Millward, Steve Nash, David Redfearn, David Willicombe; Goals: Roger Millward (7)

Scully Park, Tamworth
Attendance: 10,640
Referee: Adrian Wilson

Northern Division: Phil Harris, Bill Russell, Ashley Barnett, Gary Sampson, Gary Lingwood, Ron Starr, Ray Stewart, John Donnelly, Ray Lanesbury, Paul Hassab (c), J. Scott, Ken Orr, Geoff Sheedy. Reserves – Wayne Hetherington, John Lennan. Coach – Don Adams

Great Britain: Paul Charlton, David Willicombe, David Eckersley, Chris Hesketh (c), David Redfearn, Roger Millward, Steve Nash, Terry Clawson, Kevin Ashcroft, Jim Mills, Eric Chisnall, George Nicholls, Steve Norton. Reserves – Ken Gill, John Bates

26 June 1974

West Division NSW	10 – 25	Great Britain Lions
Tries: Norm Armstrong; Goals: Nelson Smith (3); Drop goals: Robbie Pilon (1)	Report	Tries: Ken Gill (2), Les Dyl, Steve Norton, David Redfearn; Goals: John Gray (5)

Wade Park, Orange
Attendance: 6,238
Referee: Kevin Honeybrook

Western Division: Paul Sams, D. Kent, Peter Walkom, Ron McDonald, Norm Armstrong, Paul Dowling, Robbie Pilon, David Ritchie, Billy Rose, Greg Fearnley, Terry Ellery, Nelson Smith, D. Ross. Reserves – I. Toohey, Peter Frew. Coach – Johnny King

Great Britain: Paul Charlton, David Redfearn, Chris Hesketh (c), Les Dyl, John Atkinson, Ken Gill, Alan Bates, Jimmy Thompson, Keith Bridges, Jim Mills, John Gray, Eric Chisnall, Steve Norton. Reserves – David Willicombe, John Butler

29 June 1974

NSW Firsts	13 – 9	Great Britain Lions
Tries: Tom Raudonikis, Jeff Shield, Lionel Williamson; Goals: Michael Cronin (2)	Report	Tries: Ken Gill; Goals: David Eckersley (3)

Sydney Cricket Ground, Sydney
Attendance: 16,112
Referee: Keith Page

New South Wales: Russell Fairfax, David Waite, Michael Cronin, Ray Branighan, Lionel Williamson, Jeff Shield, Tom Raudonikis, Bob McCarthy, George Piggins, Ron Turner, Rod Reddy, Gary Stephens, Ron Coote (c). Reserves – Terry Randall, Keith Harris. Coach – Graeme Langlands

Great Britain: Paul Charlton, David Willicombe, David Eckersley, Chris Hesketh (c), David Redfearn, Ken Gill, Steve Nash, Terry Clawson, Kevin Ashcroft, Jim Mills, Eric Chisnall, Steve Norton, George Nicholls. Reserves – Jimmy Thompson, Keith Bridges,

30 June 1974

Illawarra Firsts	22 – 26	Great Britain Lions
Tries: Tony Branson, Allan Fitzgibbon, Greg Mullane, Allan McMahon; Goals: Dave Cotter (5)	Report	Tries: Ken Gill (2), Alan Bates, Roger Millward, David Redfearn, Paul Rose; Goals: John Gray (4)

Wollongong Showground, Wollongong
Attendance: 8,364
Referee: Les Ballard

Illawarra Firsts: Dave Cotter, Allan McMahon, Phil Doherty, Greg Mullane, John Penno, Les Mara, Warwick Shirlaw, Cliff Watson (c), John Floyd, Charlie Bennett, John Jansen, Roger Irving, Allan Fitzgibbon. Reserves – Tony Branson, Klaus Reh. Coach – Norm Provan

Great Britain: Paul Charlton, John Butler, David Eckersley, Ken Gill, David Redfearn, Roger Millward, (c), Alan Bates, John Gray, Jimmy Thompson, Jim Mills, Paul Rose, Eric Chisnall, Colin Dixon. Reserves – John Bevan, Steve Nash

==== Second Test ====
In a virtual repeat of the 2nd Ashes Test on the 1973 Kangaroo tour, Graeme Langlands was forced to coach from the sidelines due to injury with Manly-Warringah's goal-kicking fullback Graham Eadie selected as his replacement. And like that day almost 8 months earlier in Leeds, it was the visitors who would level the series with Great Britain scoring a 16–11 win in front of 48,008 fans in Sydney.

6 July 1974

Australia	11 – 16	Great Britain
Tries: Ron Coote; Bob Fulton; John Lang; Goals: Michael Cronin (1/3); Graham Eadie (0/2)		Tries: Eric Chisnall; Colin Dixon; Ken Gill; Goals: John Gray (3); Drop goals: John Gray (1)

Sydney Cricket Ground, Sydney
Attendance: 48,006
Referee: Keith Page (Australia)

Australia	Position	Great Britain
Graham Eadie	FB	Paul Charlton
David Waite	WG	Les Dyl
Bob Fulton	CE	David Eckersley
Michael Cronin	CE	Chris Hesketh (c)
Warren Orr	WG	Roger Millward
Geoff Richardson	FE/SO	Ken Gill
Tom Raudonikis	HB/SH	Steve Nash
Bob O'Reilly	PR	Jim Mills
John Lang	HK	John Gray
Arthur Beetson (c)	PR	Jimmy Thompson
Gary Stephens	SR	Eric Chisnall
Paul Sait	SR	Colin Dixon
Ron Coote	LK/LF	George Nicholls
Ray Branighan	Int.	Steve Norton
Bob McCarthy	Int.
Graeme Langlands	Coach	Jim Challinor

7 July 1979

Monaro	7 – 34	Great Britain Lions
Tries: Geoff Noble; Goals: John Ballesty (2)	Report	Tries: John Butler (2), Roger Millward (2), George Nicholls, Steve Norton, Bill Ramsay, Maurice Richards; Goals: Roger Millward (5)

Seiffert Oval, Queanbeyan
Attendance: 10,584
Referee: Tom Spain

Monaro: Jon Stone, Paul Ryan, Richard Moncrieff, Pat Fairhall, Tim Edwards, John Ballesty, Geoff Noble, Jim Morgan (c), Jamie Jones, Gary Kerr, John Bruce, Brian Bourke, Don McKay. Reserves – Bill Monie, Bob Belford. Coach –

Great Britain: Paul Charlton, Maurice Richards, John Butler, David Eckersley, Roger Millward, Ken Gill, Alan Bates, Jimmy Thompson, Eric Chisnall, Bill Ramsay, Colin Dixon, Steve Norton, George Nicholls. Reserves – Steve Nash, Chris Hesketh (c)

10 July 1974

Riverina	10 – 36	Great Britain Lions
Tries: Bob Adamson, John Wright; Goals: Jim Bonus (2)	Report	Tries: David Redfearn (3), Maurice Richards (2), John Butler, Jim Mills, Steve Norton; Goals: David Eckersley (3); Bill Ramsay (3)

Eric Weissel Oval, Wagga Wagga
Attendance: 8,000
Referee: Graham Barby

Riverina: John Shea, Graham Saddler, Greg Hamilton, Jim Bonus, Dick Timbs, Bob Priest (c), Bob Adamson, Dave Howell, Mike Johnston, Harry Sanson, John Wright, Neville Wornes, Rob Schultz. Reserves – Norm Geaghan, Neil Scobie. Coach – Graham Kennedy

Great Britain: David Eckersley, David Redfearn, Les Dyl, David Willicombe, Maurice Richards, John Butler, Alan Bates, Eric Chisnall, Bill Ramsay, Jim Mills, Paul Rose, Jimmy Thompson, Steve Norton. Reserves – Chris Hesketh (c), Paul Charlton

13 July 1974

Newcastle Firsts	14 – 24	Great Britain Lions
Tries: Mark Scobie, Warren Scotman; Goals: Keith Hemsworth (4)	Report	Tries: John Bevan (2), David Willicombe (2), George Nicholls, Paul Rose; Goals: Bill Ramsay (2); David Eckersley (1)

Newcastle International Sports Centre, Newcastle
Attendance: 16,130
Referee: Adrian Wilson

Newcastle Firsts: Keith Hemsworth, Warren Scotman, Mark Scobie, Kevin Myers, Rod Sneesby, Robbie Wise, Dennis Ward, George Skeers, Norm Henderson, David White, Allan Thomson (c), Jeff Roach, Peter Howlett. Reserves – Greg Owens, Roger Mullard. Coach – Johnny Raper

Great Britain: David Eckersley, Maurice Richards, David Willicombe, John Bevan, Les Dyl, John Butler, Alan Bates, Jimmy Thompson, Bill Ramsay, Jim Mills, Colin Dixon, Paul Rose, George Nicholls. Reserves – Chris Hesketh (c), Kevin Ashcroft

==== Third Test ====
20 July 1974

Australia	22 – 18	Great Britain
Tries: Ron Coote; Graeme Langlands; Bob McCarthy; Lionel Williamson; Goals: Graeme Langlands (5)		Tries: Les Dyl; Maurice Richards; Goals: John Gray (6)

Sydney Cricket Ground, Sydney
Attendance: 55,505
Referee: Keith Page (Australia)

Australia	Position	Great Britain
Graeme Langlands (c)	FB	Paul Charlton
Lionel Williamson	WG	Maurice Richards
Bob Fulton	CE	Les Dyl
Michael Cronin	CE	Chris Hesketh (c)
Ray Branighan	WG	John Bevan
Tim Pickup	FE/SO	Ken Gill
Tom Raudonikis	HB/SH	Steve Nash
Arthur Beetson	PR	Jimmy Thompson
Ron Turner	HK	John Gray
John O'Neill	PR	Terry Clawson
Bob McCarthy	SR	Eric Chisnall
Gary Stephens	SR	Colin Dixon
Ron Coote	LK/LF	George Nicholls
	Int.	Roger Millward
	Int.	Paul Rose
Graeme Langlands	Coach	Jim Challinor

21 July 1974

Southern NSW	16 – 10	Great Britain Lions
Tries: Colin Bagnall, Ron Henry; Goals: Jim Hall (5)	Report	Tries: Steve Norton, Maurice Richards; Goals: David Redfearn (2)

Grahame Park, Gosford
Attendance: 6,500
Referee: Tom Gustard

Southern NSW: Stan Ralph, Steve Maxwell, Michael Farquhar, Michael Cronin (c), Ron Henry, Colin Bagnall, Chris Anderson, Jim Hall, David McKenzie, Phil Flack, Daryl Palmer, Jim Cronin, Trevor Andrews. Reserves – Warwick Randall, Steve McKenzie. Coach – Ray Corkery

Great Britain: Steve Nash, David Redfearn, David Willicombe, John Bevan, Maurice Richards, Ken Gill, Roger Millward (c), Paul Rose, Kevin Ashcroft, Jimmy Thompson, John Butler, Steve Norton, Alan Bates. Reserves – David Watkins, Keith Bridges

=== New Zealand ===
24 July 1974

North Island	17 – 37	Great Britain Lions
Tries: R. Davies, Eddie Orchard, J. Tuineau; Goals: D. Raihe (4)	Report	Tries: David Redfearn (4), John Bevan (2), John Butler, Ken Gill, Les Dyl; Goals: John Gray (5)

Davies Park, Huntly
Attendance: 2,800

North Island: V. Snowball, G. Carlyon, W. Rangi, R. Davies, Kevin Fisher, Harry Waikai, B. Berryman, Bill Raihe (c), Neil Aspin, J. Tuineau, D. Raihe, Graeme West, Paul Ravlich. Reserves – Jim Rutene, Eddie Orchard. Coach –

Great Britain: David Watkins (c), Maurice Richards, David Redfearn, Les Dyl, John Bevan, John Butler, Alan Bates, Paul Rose, Kevin Ashcroft, Keith Bridges, John Gray, Colin Dixon, Steve Norton. Reserves – Ken Gill, Bill Ramsay

==== First Test ====
27 July 1974

New Zealand	13 – 8	Great Britain
Tries: Ken Stirling; Goals: Warren Collicoat (5)		Tries: John Bevan, Steve Nash; Goals: Terry Clawson (1)

Carlaw Park, Auckland
Attendance: 10,466
Referee: John Percival (New Zealand)

New Zealand	Position	Great Britain
Warren Collicoat	FB	Paul Charlton
Mocky Brereton	WG	David Redfearn
Bill Johnsen	CE	Les Dyl
Eddie Kerrigan	CE	Chris Hesketh (c)
John O'Sullivan	WG	John Bevan
Dennis Williams	FE/SO	Ken Gill
Ken Stirling (c)	HB/SH	Steve Nash
Lyndsay Proctor	PR	Terry Clawson
Bill Burgoyne	HK	John Gray
Doug Gailey	PR	Jimmy Thompson
Tony Coll	SR	Colin Dixon
John Greengrass	SR	Steve Norton
Murray Eade	LK/LF	George Nicholls
Wayne Robertson	Int.	Kevin Ashcroft
	Int.
George Menzies	Coach	Jim Challinor

30 July 1974

New Zealand Māori	16 – 19	Great Britain Lions
Tries: Dennis Key, Josh Liavaa; Goals: Dane Sorensen (5)	Report	Tries: Steve Nash, Maurice Richards, Jimmy Thompson; Goals: Terry Clawson (5)

Rotorua International Stadium, Rotorua
Attendance: 4,000
Referee: Bob Cooper

Māori: Paul Matete, David Liavaa, Pesa Sua, Dennis Williams, Eddie Kerrigan, Ray Harris, Dennis Key, Bill Raihe, William Burgoyne (c), Clarrie Whaange, Dane Sorensen, Josh Liavaa, Peter Gurnick. Reserves – Eddie Orchard, Kevin Tamati. Coach –

Great Britain: Paul Charlton, David Redfearn, Les Dyl, Chris Hesketh (c), Maurice Richards, John Butler, Steve Nash, Terry Clawson, Kevin Ashcroft, Jimmy Thompson, Colin Dixon, Steve Norton, George Nicholls. Reserves –

1 August 1974

Wellington	11 – 39	Great Britain Lions
Tries: M. Brandon; Goals: Alan Brooks (4)	Report	Tries: Roger Millward (2), Kevin Ashcroft, Alan Bates, John Bevan, Ken Gill, Steve Norton, Bill Ramsay, David Redfearn; Goals: Roger Millward (6)

Basin Reserve, Wellington
Attendance: 5,000
Referee: M. Anderson

Wellington: Alan Brooks, Meredith, Thompson, M. Edmonds, M. Brandon, Nolan Tupaea, Cohen, R, Farrell, Collier, Whetu Henry, Morris, Smith, Hannah. Reserves – Kevin Tamati. Coach –

Great Britain: Maurice Richards, David Redfearn, Roger Millward (c), John Butler, John Bevan, Ken Gill, Alan Bates, Jim Mills, Kevin Ashcroft, Jimmy Thompson, Bill Ramsay, Eric Chisnall, Steve Norton. Reserves – Colin Dixon

==== Second Test ====
4 August 1974

New Zealand	8 – 17	Great Britain
Goals: Warren Collicoat (4)		Tries: Les Dyl; Chris Hesketh; David Redfearn; Goals: John Gray (4)

Addington Showgrounds, Christchurch
Attendance: 6,316
Referee: Peter Yaxley (New Zealand)

New Zealand	Position	Great Britain
Warren Collicoat	FB	Paul Charlton
Mocky Brereton	WG	David Redfearn
John O'Sullivan	CE	Les Dyl
Bill Johnsen	CE	Colin Dixon
Eddie Kerrigan	WG	Maurice Richards
Dennis Williams	FE/SO	Chris Hesketh (c)
Ken Stirling (c)	HB/SH	Steve Nash
Doug Gailey	PR	Jim Mills
John Hibbs	HK	John Gray
John Greengrass	PR	Jimmy Thompson
Tony Coll	SR	Eric Chisnall
Wayne Robertson	SR	Steve Norton
Murray Eade	LK/LF	George Nicholls
Don Mann	Int.	Alan Bates
	Int.
George Menzies	Coach	Jim Challinor

6 August 1974

South Island	2 – 33	Great Britain Lions
Goals: Michael O'Donnell (1/4)	Report	Tries: John Bevan (2), John Butler, Jim Challinor, Roger Millward, David Redfearn, David Willicombe; Goals: John Gray (6/8)

Wingham Park, Greymouth
Attendance: 2,500
Referee: Ted Gutbertlet

South Island: Ray Haffenden, J. Low, Bruce Dickison, Michael O'Donnell, G. Scully, Kevin Murcott, Graeme Cooksley, Alan Rushton, Dale Brown, D. Adamson, S. Hatipov. Lachie Grant, Rodney Walker. Reserves – D. Murphy, A. Bowes. Coach –

Great Britain: John Bevan, David Redfearn, Jim Challinor (c), Roger Millward, Maurice Richards, John Butler, Alan Bates, Jim Mills, Kevin Ashcroft, Bill Ramsay, John Gray, Colin Dixon, George Nicholls. Reserves – David Willicombe

==== Third Test ====
10 August 1974

New Zealand	0 – 20	Great Britain
		Tries: John Bevan (2); Les Dyl; Chris Hesketh; Goals: John Gray (4)

Carlaw Park, Auckland
Attendance: 11,574
Referee: John Percival (New Zealand)

New Zealand	Position	Great Britain
Warren Collicoat	FB	Paul Charlton
Mocky Brereton	WG	David Redfearn
John O'Sullivan	CE	Les Dyl
Bill Johnsen	CE	David Willicombe
Eddie Kerrigan	WG	John Bevan
Dennis Williams	FE/SO	Chris Hesketh (c)
Ken Stirling (c)	HB/SH	Steve Nash
Doug Gailey	PR	Terry Clawson
John Hibbs	HK	John Gray
Don Mann	PR	Jimmy Thompson
Wayne Robertson	SR	Eric Chisnall
John Greengrass	SR	Colin Dixon
Murray Eade	LK/LF	George Nicholls
Bob Jarvis	Int.	Alan Bates
Peter Gurnick	Int.	Bill Ramsay
George Menzies	Coach	Jim Challinor

13 August 1974

Auckland	11 – 2	Great Britain Lions
Tries: Bob Jarvis; Goals: Warren Collicoat (4/5)	Report	Goals: John Gray (1)

Carlaw Park, Auckland
Attendance: 10,000
Referee: Bob Cooper

Auckland: Warren Collicoat, L. Hall, John O'Sullivan, Dennis Williams, Colin Andrew, John Smith, Ken Stirling (c), Tony Kriletich, Tom Conroy, Don Mann, Peter Gurnick, Josh Liavaa, Barrie Dyer. Reserves – Bob Jarvis, Doug Gailey. Coach –

Great Britain: David Willicombe, David Redfearn, Les Dyl, John Butler, John Bevan, Chris Hesketh (c), Alan Bates, Terry Clawson, Kevin Ashcroft, Jimmy Thompson, Eric Chisnall, John Gray, Steve Norton. Reserves – Colin Dixon

== Statistics ==
Leading try scorer

- 15 by John Bevan

Leading point scorer

- 111 by John Gray (2 tries, 52 goals, 1 field goal)

Largest attendance

- 55,505 – Third test vs Australia at the Sydney Cricket Ground

Largest non-test attendance

- 26,000 – Queensland vs Great Britain at Lang Park
