= 1975 New Zealand rugby league season =

Seasons
- 1974 1976

The 1975 New Zealand rugby league season was the 68th season of rugby league that had been played in New Zealand.

== International competitions ==
New Zealand participated in the World Championship, playing home and away to each nation. They lost twice to Australia, and once each to England and Wales. They defeated both France and Wales and had draws against England and France. The New Zealand team was coached by George Menzies and consisted of Kevin Barry, Paul Matete, Les Beehre, Mocky Brereton, Fred Ah Kuoi, John Smith, Kurt Sorensen, Bruce Dickison, Tony Gordon, Dane Sorensen, Ray Baxendale, John Greengrass, John Whittaker, Phillip Orchard, Dennis Williams, vice-captain Murray Eade, John O'Sullivan, Barrie Dyer, Warren Collicoat, Peter Gurnick, Tony Coll, captain Ken Stirling, Kevin Potter, Lyndsay Proctor, Bob Jarvis, Don Munro, Tom Conroy, Murray Wright, Josh Liavaa, John Wright, Graeme West and John Hibbs.

Auckland defeated France on 13 June 9–3 at Carlaw Park in front of 10,000 fans. Auckland, who without their Kiwi players, were coached by Bill Sorensen and included: Warren Winter, Fred Ah Kuoi, Ken Andersson, captain Dave Sorensen, Colin Andrews, Chris Jordan, Stewart Norton, Alby Hansen, Murray Wright, Mark Graham, Graham Price and Barrie Dyer.

Wales defeated Wellington 8-52, West Coast 5-35 and Canterbury 25–18. The Canterbury game was marred when Jim Mills felled Mark Broadhurst from behind. Wales then lost to Auckland 31–5. Auckland had their Kiwi representatives back and included: Warren Collicoat, Fred Ah Kuoi, John O'Sullivan, captain Dennis Williams, Colin Andrews, Bob Jarvis, Ken Stirling, Dane Sorensen, Tom Conroy, Alby Hansen, Mark Graham, Kurt Sorensen and Murray Eade. Bench: Dave Sorensen and Doug Taurua.

Auckland also lost to Australia 6-17 during the season. Auckland included Collicoat, Ah Kuoi, Paul Matete, captain Williams, Bill Sorensen junior, John Smith, Shane Dowsett, Hansen, Murray Wright, Wayne Robertson, Kurt Sorensen, Peter Gurnick and Graham. Bench: Barrie Dyer and Doug Taurua.

The New Zealand Māori side participated in the Pacific Cup. They defeated Papua New Guinea 38–13 in the final. Coached by Tom Newton, the New Zealand Māori squad included Paul Matete, John Wilson, Fred Ah Kuoi, John Smith, Rick Muru, Dane Sorensen, Dennis Key, Ian Bell and captain Richard Bolton.

The Auckland under 21 side toured New South Wales. The team was coached by Graham Lowe and included Owen Wright and Glenn Taylor.

Ken Stirling won the New Zealand Rugby League's player of the year award.

== National competitions ==
=== Rugby League Cup ===
Canterbury toured with the Rugby League Cup, defeating Wellington at the Addington Showgrounds 28-13 before losing to Taranaki 43–13 in New Plymouth. The Wellington match was originally scheduled to be played in Wellington but was transferred due to television demands.

Waikato held the Rugby League Cup at the end of the season.

=== Inter-district competition ===
Canterbury won the Rothmans trophy. Canterbury defeated Auckland 15–14 to win the trophy at Carlaw Park. The victory was Canterbury's first at the venue. Canterbury had earlier defeated Wellington, Waikato and narrowly defeated the West Coast at Wingham Park. The West Coast had earlier defeated Auckland 20–17.

- Auckland were coached by Bill Sorensen and included Fred Ah Kuoi, Wayne Robertson, captain Dennis Williams, Ken Stirling, John O'Sullivan, Paul Matete, Murray Wright, Murray Eade, Bob Jarvis, Dane and Kurt Sorensen, Shane Varley, Ian Bell, Mark Graham, Warren Winter, Lyndsay Proctor, Kevin Barry and Warren Collicoat.
- Wellington included Whare Henry.
- Canterbury were coached by Gary Clarke and included Graeme Cooksley, Bruce Dickison, Alan Rushton, captain Wally Wilson, Lewis Hudson, Mark Broadhurst and Maurice Brereton. Clarke had earlier coached Papanui and later coached Sydenham and Woolston and served as a New Zealand selector.

== Australasian competition ==
Auckland drew with the Manly-Warringah Sea Eagles 14-all in Round one of the Amco Cup, advancing on penalty count back. They then defeated Newcastle 26-16 before losing 23–10 to the Eastern Suburbs Roosters in the Semi finals of the competition.

== Club competitions ==
=== Auckland ===
Otahuhu won the Auckland Rugby League's Fox Memorial Trophy, Rukutai Shield, Roope Rooster and Stormont Shield. They defeated Northcote 22–8 in the Fox Memorial grand final. Northcote won the Kiwi Shield, Mangere East won the Sharman Cup while Pt Chevalier won the Norton Cup.

Shane Dowsett (Otahuhu) won the Lipscombe Cup, Dane Sorensen (Mt Wellington) won the Rothville Trophy, Tom Conroy (Ponsonby) and Fred Ah Kuoi (Richmond) won the Bert Humphries Memorial medals, Mark Graham (Otahuhu) won the Tetley Trophy, John Wilson (Northcote) won the Painter Rosebowl Trophy and Joe Gwynne (Otahuhu) won the Hyland Memorial Cup.

The Maritime club "burst onto the scene" in 1975, signing Roger Bailey, Rick Carey, Kevin Potter, Tony Gordon and former All Black Graham Whiting.

Mount Wellington included Kurt Sorensen while Wayne Redmond played for Glenora. Warren Collicoat played for Mount Albert. Wayne Robertson and John O'Sullivan played for Ponsonby while Otahuhu were coached by Joe Gwynne and included Glenn Taylor, Murray Wright and Bob Jarvis.

=== Wellington ===
Waterside won the Wellington Rugby League's Appleton Shield.

Kevin Tamati played for Upper Hutt.

=== Canterbury ===
Christchurch, Eastern Suburbs won the Canterbury Rugby League's Pat Smith Challenge Trophy.

=== Other Competitions ===
The Waitara Bears won the Taranaki Rugby League championship. Marist were the runners up Waitara also won the DB Draught North Island club competition.
