= 1974 New Zealand rugby league season =

Seasons
- ← 1973 1975 →

The 1974 New Zealand rugby league season was the 67th season of rugby league that had been played in New Zealand. The season was played under a five tackle limit rule.

== International competitions ==
New Zealand lost a series 1–2 to Great Britain. Alister Atkinson was the New Zealand manager while George Menzies was the coach. New Zealand included; Mocky Brereton, Bill Burgoyne, Warren Collicoat, Tony Coll, Murray Eade, Doug Gailey, John Greengrass, Peter Gurnick, John Hibbs, Bob Jarvis, Bill Johnsen, Eddie Kerrigan, Don Mann, John O'Sullivan, Lyndsay Proctor, Wayne Robertson, captain Ken Stirling and Dennis Williams.

Auckland defeated Great Britain 11–2 at Carlaw Park. Auckland included Warren Collicoat, Len Hall, John O'Sullivan, Dennis Williams, Colin Andrews, Graham Smith, Ken Stirling, Tony Kriletich, Tom Conroy, captain Don Mann, Peter Gurnick, Josh Liavaa and Barrie Dyer. Bench: Bob Jarvis and Doug Gailey.

The South Island lost to Great Britain 33–2 in Greymouth. The South Island included Ray Haffenden, Bruce Dickison, Michael O'Donnell, Graeme Cooksley, Alan Rushton and Rodney Walker.

Auckland lost to New South Wales Country 21-6 and Brisbane City 10–4 at Carlaw Park.

Ken Stirling won the New Zealand Rugby League's player of the year award.

== National competitions ==
=== Rugby League Cup ===
Canterbury held the Rugby League Cup at the end of the season, after they defeated the West Coast 28–8 in Christchurch to win the trophy. Canterbury again defeated the West Coast 18–5 in the only successful defence of the trophy that season.

=== Inter-district competition ===
Auckland won the Rothmans trophy, defeating Canterbury 23–0, Wellington 47–12, the West Coast 46-0 and Waikato 14–7.

Canterbury thrashed Wellington 37–3 in the first provincial match held under lights at the Addington Showgrounds.

Ken Stirling, Tom Conroy, Tony Kriletich, Shane Dowsett, captain Roger Bailey and Warren Collicoat played for Auckland.

Canterbury included Bruce Dickison, Graeme Cooksley, John Greengrass, Alan Rushton, captain Mocky Brereton, Wally Wilson and Rodney Walker.

== Australasian competition ==
Auckland were eliminated in Round two of the Amco Cup when they lost 7–13 to Western Division at Leichhardt Oval. Western Division went on to win the tournament.

== Club competitions ==
=== Auckland ===
Ellerslie won the Auckland Rugby League's Fox Memorial Trophy, Rukutai Shield and Stormont Shield. They defeated Ponsonby 16–8 in the Fox Memorial grand final. Otahuhu won the Roope Rooster, Mount Wellington and Ponsonby shared the Kiwi Shield, Te Atatu won the Sharman Cup and Maritime and City Newton shared the Norton Cup.

Bruce Rowe (Ellerslie) won the Lipscombe Cup and Painter Rosebowl Trophy, Graham Smith (Ellerslie) won the Rothville Trophy, Tom Conroy (Ponsonby) and Bob Jarvis (Otahuhu) won the Bert Humphries Memorial, Colin Wells (Ponsonby) won the Tetley Trophy and Morrie Robertson (Ellerslie) won the Hyland Memorial Cup.

=== Wellington ===
Petone won the Wellington Rugby League's Appleton Shield.

Kevin Tamati played for Petone.

=== Canterbury ===
Papanui won the Canterbury Rugby League's Pat Smith Challenge Trophy.

Papanui and Linwood played in the first club game under lights at Addington Showgrounds.

Jim Chamberlain, an English professional with Rochdale Hornets, Barrow and Racing Club Albi XIII, played for Sydenham.
