= 1973 New Zealand rugby league season =

Seasons
- ← 1972 1974 →

The 1973 New Zealand rugby league season was the 66th season of rugby league that had been played in New Zealand.

== International competitions ==
New Zealand did not play any Tests after France cancelled their planned tour of New Zealand.

The Te Atatu Roosters played the first ever Australian Aboriginal side in February 1973, losing 13–17. The Aboriginal side then lost 37–6 to a Canterbury XIII.

Auckland sent an under-23's side on a three match tour of New South Wales. They lost to Cronulla-Sutherland 20-8 before beating the Australian Aboriginal team 23–5 in an electrical storm at Redfern Oval and then losing 14–11 to the Australian Capital Territory. The team included Dane O'Hara, John Smith, John Wright and Stan Martin.

Ponsonby defeated the New South Wales Rugby League's Cronulla-Sutherland Sharks 27–21 in front of 15,000 at Carlaw Park on 30 September.

John Hibbs won the New Zealand Rugby League's player of the year award.

== National competitions ==
=== Rugby League Cup ===
West Coast again held the Rugby League Cup at the end of the season.

=== Inter-zone competition ===
Southern Zone defeated Northern Zone 16–12. Southern Zone included Mocky Brereton, Eddie Kerrigan, Bruce Dickison, John Greengrass and Rodney Walker.

=== Inter-district competition ===
Auckland won the Rothmans trophy, defeating Wellington 29–13 in the final. They had earlier defeated Northland 33-2 and Wellington 34-14 before losing to the West Coast 14–25.

Auckland defeated Taranaki 28–17 at Pukekura Park.

Auckland were selected by Ray Cranch, Travers Hardwick and selector-coach Neville Denton and included Bob Jarvis, Tom Conroy, Dave Sorensen, Kevin Barry, Wayne Robertson, Lyndsay Proctor, captain Dennis Williams, vice-captain Murray Eade, Brian Tracey, Doug Gailey, Peter Gurnick, John O'Sullivan, Don Mann and Warren Collicoat. John Hibbs played for the West Coast.

== Club competitions ==
=== Auckland ===
Ponsonby won the Auckland Rugby League's Fox Memorial Trophy, Rukutai Shield and Stormont Shield. They defeated Otahuhu 15–5 in the Fox Memorial grand final. Mt Wellington won the Roope Rooster, Otahuhu won the Kiwi Shield, Te Atatu won the Sharman Cup and North Shore won the Norton Cup.

Tom Conroy (Ponsonby) won the Lipscombe Cup, Don Mann (Ponsonby) won the Rothville Trophy, Lyndsay Proctor (Ellerslie) and Dave Sorenson (Mt Wellington) won the Bert Humphries Memorial, Ashley McEwen (Mt Albert) won the Tetley Trophy, Ernie Wiggs (Mt Albert) won the Painter Rosebowl Trophy and Roger Bailey (Ponsonby) won the Hyland Memorial Cup.

Warren Collicoat played for Mount Albert and Ponsonby were coached by Bill Telford and included John O'Sullivan, Brian Tracey and Wayne Robertson. Morrie Robertson coached Ellerslie.

=== Wellington ===
Petone won the Wellington Rugby League's Appleton Shield.

Kevin Tamati played for Petone.

=== Canterbury ===
Papanui won the Canterbury Rugby League's Pat Smith Challenge Trophy, defeating Marist Western Suburbs 22–17 in the Grand Final. Linwood won the Massetti Cup while Addington won the Gore Cup.

Wayne Beri (Marist-Western) won the D.V. Syme Rosebowl as Sportsman of the year while Phil Brown (Marist-Western) and Bruce Dickison (Eastern) shared the A.G.Bailey Challenge Cup and Cliff Leney (Linwood) won the Turner and Le Brun Cup. Rodney Walker played for Papanui.

=== Other Competitions ===
Papanui defeated Runanga 19–2 to win the Thacker Shield.
