= 1972 New Zealand rugby league season =

Seasons
- ← 1971 1973 →

The 1972 New Zealand rugby league season was the 65th season of rugby league that had been played in New Zealand.

== International competitions ==
New Zealand toured Australia, losing the series 0–2. The team was coached by Lory Blanchard. They then headed to Great Britain and France for the World Cup. The Kiwis lost to Great Britain, Australia and France. The World Cup team was coached by Des Barchard and managed by Trevor Wellsmore and consisted of: Mocky Brereton, Bill Burgoyne, Roy Christian, Tony Coll, Warren Collicoat, Graeme Cooksley, Murray Eade, Doug Gailey, Peter Gurnick, Don Mann, Mita Mohi, John O'Sullivan, Phillip Orchard, Bob Paul, Brian Tracey, Rodney Walker, John Whittaker, Dennis Williams and John Wilson.

Auckland lost to Queensland 18–17. Canterbury lost to the Western Suburbs Magpies.

New Zealand Māori defeated Pakeha 18–13. Māori included Roy Christian.

John Whittaker won the New Zealand Rugby League's player of the year award.

== National competitions ==
=== Rugby League Cup ===
West Coast again held the Rugby League Cup at the end of the season.

=== Inter-district competition ===
Auckland won the Rothmans trophy, beating Waikato 20–11, Wellington 41-13 and drawing with Canterbury 16-all.

Auckland lost to Taranaki 3–2 at Pukekura Park.

Auckland included Warren Collicoat, Dave Sorensen, Ray Williams and Ken Stirling. John Whittaker played for Wellington.

== Club competitions ==
=== Auckland ===
Ponsonby won the Auckland Rugby League's Fox Memorial Trophy, defeating Ellerslie 14–12 in the grand final. They completed "the treble" by also winning the Stormont Shield and Roope Rooster in the same season. Ellerslie won the Rukutai Shield, Otahuhu won the Kiwi Shield, Richmond won the Sharman Cup and Mount Roskill won the Norton Cup.

Bill Harford (Te Atatu) won the Lipscombe Cup, Murray Eade (Ellerslie) won the Rothville Trophy, Peter Gurnick (Otahuhu) and Len Hall (Ellerslie) won the Bert Humphries Memorial while Hall also won the Tetley Trophy. Bruce Rowe (Ellerslie) won the Painter Rosebowl Trophy and Don Mann (Ponsonby) won the Hyland Memorial Cup.

Morrie Robertson coached Ellerslie.

=== Wellington ===
Petone won the Wellington Rugby League's Appleton Shield.

Kevin Tamati played for Petone.

=== Canterbury ===
Papanui won the Canterbury Rugby League's Pat Smith Challenge Trophy, defeating Marist-Western Suburbs 27–9. Marist-Western Suburbs had won the Massetti Cup while Hornby won the Gore Cup.

Papanui also regained the Thacker Shield for Canterbury after the West Coast clubs had held it for eight years. They defeated Waro-Rakau 22–0.

Mita Mohi (Marist-Western) and Ivan Reuben (Kaiapoi) shared the D.V. Syme Rosebowl while Phil Brown (Marist-Western) won the A.G.Bailey Challenge Cup (tries) and Michael O'Donnell (Marist-Western) and Trevor Williams (Hornby) shared the Turner and Le Brun Cup. Rodney Walker played for Papanui.

The Canterbury Rugby League had been granted use of a field on Hagley Park for the first time in years.
