= Dauth =

Surname list

Dauth is a surname. Notable people with the surname include:

- Ian Dauth (born 1949), Australian rugby league footballer
- John Dauth (born 1947), Australian public servant and diplomat
- Thorsten Dauth (born 1968), German decathlete
