= Beehre =

Beehre is a surname. Notable people with the surname include:

- Josh Beehre (born 2002), New Zealand rugby union player
- Les Beehre (born 1952), New Zealand international rugby league footballer
