= Warren Orr =

Warren Orr may refer to:

- Warren H. Orr, American jurist
- Warren Orr (rugby league), Australian rugby league footballer
