= 1975–76 Lancashire Cup =

- Structure: Regional knockout championship
- Teams: 14
- Winners: Widnes
- Runners-up: Salford

1975–76 was the sixty-third occasion on which the Lancashire Cup completion had been held.

Widnes won the trophy by beating Salford by the score of 16-7
The match was played at Central Park, Wigan, (historically in the county of Lancashire). The attendance was 7,566 and receipts were £3,880.00

== Background ==
The total number of teams entering the competition remained at last season’s total of 14 with no junior/amateur clubs taking part.
The same fixture format was retained, but due to the decrease in the number of participating clubs, resulted in one “blank” or “dummy” fixture in the first round, and one bye in the second round.

== Competition and results ==
=== Round 1 ===
Involved 7 matches (with one “blank” fixture) and 14 clubs

Game No	Fixture date	Home team	Score	Away team	Venue	Att	Rec	Notes	Ref
1	Sat 30 Aug 1975	Oldham	17-19	St. Helens	Watersheddings	3011			
2	Sun 31 Aug 1975	Barrow	9-14	Swinton	Craven Park				
3	Sun 31 Aug 1975	Blackpool Borough	3-11	Leigh	Borough Park				
4	Sun 31 Aug 1975	Rochdale Hornets	10-22	Workington Town	Athletic Grounds				
5	Sun 31 Aug 1975	Salford	44-17	Huyton	The Willows				
6	Sun 31 Aug 1975	Warrington	14-39	Wigan	Wilderspool				
7	Sun 31 Aug 1975	Widnes	19-7	Whitehaven	Naughton Park				
8		blank		blank					

=== Round 2 - Quarter-finals ===
Involved 3 matches (with one bye) and 7 clubs

Game No	Fixture date	Home team	Score	Away team	Venue	Att	Rec	Notes	Ref
1	Sat 13 Sep 1975	Wigan	21-22	Workington Town	Central Park				
2	Sun 14 Sep 1975	Leigh	6-23	Salford	Hilton Park				
3	Sun 14 Sep 1975	Swinton	2-17	St. Helens	Station Road	4029			
4		Widnes		bye					

=== Round 3 – Semi-finals ===
Involved 2 matches and 4 clubs

Game No	Fixture date	Home team	Score	Away team	Venue	Att	Rec	Notes	Ref
1	Tue 16 Sep 1975	Workington Town	2-16	Widnes	Derwent Park				
2	Tue 23 Sep 1975	St. Helens	8-21	Salford	Knowsley Road	9000			

=== Final ===
Game No	Fixture date	Home team	Score	Away team	Venue	Att	Rec	Notes	Ref
	Saturday 4 October 1975	Widnes	16-7	Salford	Central Park	7,566	3,880	1	

==== Teams and scorers ====
Widnes	№	Salford
	teams	
Ray Dutton	1	David Watkins
Alan Prescott	2	Keith Fielding
Mick George	3	Butler
Mal Aspey	4	Chris Hesketh
David Jenkins	5	Maurice Richards
Eric Hughes	6	Ken Gill
Reg Bowden	7	Steve Nash
Jim Mills	8	Fiddler
Derek Hammond (but see note 2)	9	Roy Hawksley
Nick Nelson	10	Colin Dixon
John Foran	11	Turnbull
Jim Fitzpatrick	12	Knighton
Mick Adams	13	Eric Prescott
	14	
Barry Sheridan (for Jim Fitzpatrick)	15	Mackay (for Dixon)
16	score	7
8	HT	5
	Scorers	
	Tries	
Alan Prescott (1)	T	Maurice Richards (1)
Mick George (1)	T	
Mal Aspey (1)	T	
	Goals	
Ray Dutton (3)	G	David Watkins (2)
	Drop Goals	
Ray Dutton (1)	DG	
Referee		W H (Billy) Thompson (Huddersfield)
Man of the match		Mick George - Widnes - Centre
sponsored by		Rugby Leaguer

Scoring - Try = three points - Goal = two points - Drop goal = one point

=== The road to success ===
First round
Warrington	14
Wigan	39
Rochdale Hornets	10
Workington Town	22
Widnes	19
blank	7
blank
blank
Barrow	9
Swinton	14
Oldham	17
St. Helens	19
Blackpool Borough	3
Leigh	11
Salford	44
Huyton	17

Second round
Wigan	21
Workington Town	22
Widnes
bye
Swinton	2
St. Helens	17
Leigh	6
Salford	23

Semi-finals
Workington Town	2
Widnes	16
St. Helens	8
Salford	21

Final
Widnes	16
Salford	7

== Notes and comments ==
1 * Central Park was the home ground of Wigan with a final capacity of 18,000, although the record attendance was 47,747 for Wigan v St Helens 27 March 1959
2 * Rothmans Rugby League Yearbook 1991-1992 Names Keith Elwell as number 9 (hooker) - The Widnes official archives name the hooker as Derek Hammond

== See also ==
- 1975–76 Northern Rugby Football League season
- Rugby league county cups
