= Chris Hesketh =

Former GB & England international rugby league footballer

Chris Hesketh MBE
Personal information
- Full name: Christopher Hesketh
- Born: 28 November 1944 Wigan, England
- Died: 10 August 2017 (aged 72)

Playing information
- Position: Centre, Stand-off
Club
Years	Team	Pld	T	G	FG	P
1963–67	Wigan	85	28	0	0	84
1967–79	Salford	452	128	0	0	384
	Total	537	156	0	0	468
Representative
Years	Team	Pld	T	G	FG	P
1967–74	Lancashire	15	4	0	0	12
1968–69	England	3	0	0	0	0
1970–74	Great Britain	23	6	0	0	18

Christopher Hesketh MBE (28 November 1944 – 10 August 2017) was an English World Cup winning professional rugby league footballer who played in the 1960s and 1970s. He played at representative level for Great Britain, England and Lancashire as a centre, and at club level for Wigan and Salford, as a centre, or stand-off.

== Background ==
Hesketh was born in Wigan, Lancashire, England, and he died aged 72.

== Playing career ==
=== Wigan ===
Hesketh started his career at Wigan in 1962, and following the rule change to allow of substitutions, along with Laurie Gilfedder he jointly became Wigan's first substitute on Saturday 14 November 1964.

=== Salford ===
Hesketh moved to Salford in 1967, with whom he remained until retiring in 1979.

Hesketh played at centre in Salford's 25–11 victory over Swinton in the 1972–73 Lancashire Cup Final during the 1972–73 season at Wilderspool Stadium, Warrington on Saturday 21 October 1972, he played at centre in the 9–19 defeat by Wigan in the 1973–74 Lancashire Cup Final at Wilderspool on Saturday 13 October 1973, and played at centre in the 7–16 defeat by Widnes in the 1975–76 Lancashire Cup Final at Central Park, Wigan on Saturday 4 October 1975.

Hesketh played at centre in Salford's 0–0 draw with Warrington in the 1974 BBC2 Floodlit Trophy final at The Willows, Salford on Tuesday 17 December 1974, and played at centre in the 10–5 victory in the replay at Wilderspool on Tuesday 28 January 1975.

Hesketh played at centre in Salford's 7–12 defeat by Leeds in the 1972–73 Player's No.6 Trophy Final during the 1972–73 season at Fartown Ground, Huddersfield on Saturday 24 March 1973.

Hesketh's Testimonial match at Salford took place in 1977.

=== International honours ===
Hesketh won caps for England while at Salford in 1968 against Wales, in 1969 against Wales, and France, and won caps for Great Britain while at Salford in 1970 against New Zealand, in the 1970 Rugby League World Cup against France (sub), New Zealand (1-try), and Australia (sub); in 1971 against France, France (sub), and New Zealand (3 matches); in the 1972 Rugby League World Cup against Australia, France, New Zealand (1-try), and Australia; in 1973 against Australia (3 matches); and in 1974 against France (2 matches), Australia (3 matches), and New Zealand (3 matches). For the 1974 Great Britain Lions tour to Australia and New Zealand, Hesketh was named as captain.

== Outside rugby league ==
In the 1976 New Year Honours, Hesketh was appointed a Member of the Order of the British Empire (MBE) for his services to rugby league.

Hesketh worked as a salesman before retiring in 2006. His death was announced in August 2017.
