= 1972–73 Yorkshire Cup =

65th edition of the Yorkshire Cup

- Structure: Regional knockout championship
- Teams: 16
- Winners: Leeds
- Runners-up: Dewsbury

The 1972–73 Yorkshire Cup was the sixty-fifth occasion on which the Yorkshire Cup competition had been held.

Leeds winning the trophy by beating Dewsbury by the score of 36–9 in what would be Dewsbury's last appearance in a Yorkshire Cup final

The match was played at Odsal in the City of Bradford, now in West Yorkshire. The attendance was 7,806 and receipts were £2,659

This was Leeds third victory (and the first of two consecutive victories) in what would be eight times in the space of thirteen seasons

== Background ==
The staging of the previous season's Yorkshire Cup during July and August was deemed a financial failure, and the competition reverted to its usual place in the calendar between August and October.

For the first time in its history, the competition was sponsored after agreeing a deal with Esso.

== Competition and results ==
=== First Round ===
Involved 8 matches (with no byes) and 16 clubs

Game No	Fixture date	Home team	Score	Away team	Venue	Att	Rec	Notes	Ref
1	Fri 25 Aug 1972	Huddersfield	26–5	Doncaster	Fartown				
2	Fri 25 Aug 1972	Hull F.C.	8–19	Leeds	Boulevard				
3	Sat 26 Aug 1972	Bramley	16–9	York	McLaren Field				
4	Sun 27 Aug 1972	Wakefield Trinity	38–17	Keighley	Belle Vue				
5	Sun 27 Aug 1972	Dewsbury	19–5	Castleford	Crown Flatt				
6	Sun 27 Aug 1972	Featherstone Rovers	38–8	Batley	Post Office Road				
7	Sun 27 Aug 1972	Hull Kingston Rovers	36–27	Bradford Northern	Craven Park (1)				
8	Sun 27 Aug 1972	Hunslet	8–76	Halifax	Parkside				

=== Second Round ===
Involved 4 matches and 8 clubs

Game No	Fixture date	Home team	Score	Away team	Venue	Att	Rec	Notes	Ref
1	Wed 5 Sep 1972	Leeds	36–5	Featherstone Rovers	Headingley				
2	Wed 6 Sep 1972	Bramley	8–20	Dewsbury	McLaren Field				
3	Wed 6 Sep 1972	Huddersfield	12–8	Hull Kingston Rovers	Fartown				
4	Thu 7 Sep 1972	Wakefield Trinity	9–11	Halifax	Belle Vue				

=== Semi-finals ===
Involved 2 matches and 4 clubs

Game No	Fixture date	Home team	Score	Away team	Venue	Att	Rec	Notes	Ref
1	Wed 20 Sep 1972	Dewsbury	19–10	Halifax	Crown Flatt				
2	Wed 20 Sep 1972	Leeds	26–13	Huddersfield	Headingley				

=== Final ===
Game No	Fixture date	Home team	Score	Away team	Venue	Att	Rec	Notes	Ref
	Saturday 7 October 1972	Leeds	36–9	Dewsbury	Odsal	7,806	£2,659	(Note: Odsal is the home ground of Bradford Northern from 1890 to 2010 and the current capacity is in the region of 26,000, The ground is famous for hosting the largest attendance at an English sports ground when 102,569 (it was reported that over 120,000 actually attended as several areas of boundary fencing collapse under the sheer weight of numbers) attended the replay of the Challenge Cup final on 5 May 1954 to see Halifax v Warrington.)	

==== Teams and scorers ====
Leeds	No.	Dewsbury
	Teams	
John Holmes	1	Adrian Rushton
Alan Smith	2	Greg Ashcroft
Syd Hynes	3	Alan Childe
Les Dyl	4	Terry Day
John Atkinson	5	Jeff Yoward
Alan Hardisty (c)	6	Allan Agar
Keith Hepworth	7	Alan Bates
Terry Clawson	8	Graham Bell
David Ward	9	Mike Stephenson
Bill Ramsey	10	Trevor Lowe
Phil Cookson	11	Jeff Grayshon
Graham Eccles	12	John Bates
Ray Batten	13	Steve Hankins
John Langley (for Hepworth)	14	Steve Lee (for Bates)
Tony Fisher (for Clawson)	15	Harry Beverley (for Bell)
Derek Turner	Coach	Tommy Smales
36	score	9
15	HT	2
	Scorers	
	Tries	
John Holmes (3)	T	Greg Ashcroft (1)
Les Dyl (2)	T	
John Atkinson	T	
Alan Hardisty (1)	T	
Graham Eccles (1)	T	
	Goals	
Syd Hynes (1)	G	Alan Bates (3)
Terry Clawson (5)	G	
Referee		Michael "Mick" J. Naughton (Widnes)
White Rose Trophy for Man of the match		John Holmes - Leeds - Fullback
sponsored by		
Competition Sponsor		Esso

Scoring - Try = three points - Goal = two points - Drop goal = one point

=== The road to success ===
First round
Hull F.C.	8
Leeds	19
Featherstone Rovers	38
Batley	8
Huddersfield	26
Doncaster	5
Hull Kingston Rovers	36
Bradford Northern	27
Bramley	16
York	9
Dewsbury	19
Castleford	5
Wakefield Trinity	38
Keighley	7
Hunslet	8
Halifax	76

Second round
Leeds	36
Featherstone Rovers	5
Huddersfield	12
Hull Kingston Rovers	8
Bramley	8
Dewsbury	20
Wakefield Trinity	9
Halifax	11

Semi-finals
Leeds	26
Huddersfield	13
Dewsbury	19
Halifax	10

Final
Leeds	36
Dewsbury	9

== See also ==
- 1972–73 Northern Rugby Football League season
- Rugby league county cups
