= John Butler (rugby league) =

English rugby league footballer

Personal information
- Born: 12 December 1949 (age 76) St Helens, Lancashire, England

Playing information
- Position: Centre, Stand-off, Loose forward, Fullback
Club
Years	Team	Pld	T	G	FG	P
1969–73	Keighley	123	45	0	0	135
1973–75	Rochdale Hornets	76	21	2	2	71
1975–79	Salford	135	50	0	0	150
1979–81	Wigan	55	18	0	0	54
1981–84	St Helens	47	9	0	0	28
1983 (loan)	→Leigh	0	0	0	0	0
1983 (loan)	→Fulham RLFC	0	0	0	0	0
	Total	436	143	2	2	438
Representative
Years	Team	Pld	T	G	FG	P
1975–79	Lancashire	9	4

John Butler (born 12 December 1949) is an English former professional rugby league footballer. Born in St Helens, Butler began his career at Keighley, and went on to play for Rochdale Hornets, Salford, Wigan and St Helens. He also represented Lancashire and was selected for the 1974 British Lions tour of Australia and New Zealand.

== Career ==
Butler started his rugby league career with Keighley, where he played as a loose forward. In April 1973, he was signed by Rochdale Hornets for a fee of £1,000. Under the guidance of coach Frank Myler, he was converted into a stand-off, and his impressive performances earned him a place on the 1974 Great Britain Lions tour of Australia and New Zealand after being named as a replacement for Keith Fielding.

In February 1974, he played for Rochdale in the final of the 1973–74 Player's No.6 Trophy against Warrington. He was substituted at half time after suffering a hip injury, and Rochdale went on to lose the game 16–27.

In March 1975, Butler and his teammate Bill Sheffield were signed by Salford for a joint fee of £8,000. Butler went on win the 1976 League Championship with Salford. In 1979, he was signed by Wigan for a fee of £15,000. He finished his career with his hometown club, St Helens Heritage no 950.

Butler is son of former St Helens Heritage no 423 and Keighley star Jack Butler. He is the Father of former Chorley Lynx, Marseille XIII and Swinton Lions player Daniel Butler.
