= David Redfearn =

GB & England international rugby league footballer

Personal information
- Born: c. 1951 Dewsbury, England

Playing information
- Position: Wing
Club
Years	Team	Pld	T	G	FG	P
1970–88	Bradford Northern	434	239	4	0	739
Representative
Years	Team	Pld	T	G	FG	P
1975	England	2	0	0	0	0
1972–74	Great Britain	7	3	0	0	9
- Relatives: Alan Redfearn (brother)

David Redfearn (born 1951) is an English former professional World Cup winning rugby league footballer who played in the 1970s and 1980s. He played at representative for Great Britain and England, and at club level for Bradford Northern, as a wing.

== Background ==
Redfearn was born in Dewsbury, West Riding of Yorkshire, England. He played junior rugby league for Shaw Cross.

== Playing career ==
=== Club career ===
Redfearn made his debut for Bradford Northern in August 1970. He played on the wing in Bradford Northern's 14–33 defeat by Featherstone Rovers in the 1973 Challenge Cup Final during the 1972–73 season at Wembley Stadium, London on Saturday 12 May 1973, in front of a crowd of 72,395.

Redfearn played on the wing in Bradford Northern's 18–8 victory over York in the 1978–79 Yorkshire Cup Final during the 1978–79 season at Headingley, Leeds on Saturday 28 October 1978, and appeared as a substitute (replacing prop Phil Sanderson) in the 5–10 defeat by Castleford in the 1981–82 Yorkshire Cup Final during the 1981–82 season at Headingley, Leeds on Saturday 3 October 1981.

Redfearn played on the wing in Bradford Northern's 3–2 victory over Widnes in the 1974–75 Player's No.6 Trophy Final during the 1974–75 season at Wilderspool Stadium, Warrington on Saturday 25 January 1975, and played at centre in the 6–0 victory over Widnes in the 1979–80 John Player Trophy Final during the 1979–80 season at Headingley, Leeds on Saturday 5 January 1980.

Redfearn initially ended his playing career in 1982, but decided to come out of retirement two years later, and continued playing for Bradford for several more years.

=== International honours ===
Redfearn was selected by Great Britain for the 1972 Rugby League World Cup. He made only one appearance during the tournament as a substitute against New Zealand, as Clive Sullivan and John Atkinson were the team's first-choice wingers. He later toured with the 1974 Great Britain Lions, playing in all three Tests against New Zealand and one against Australia.

Redfearn also won caps for England while at Bradford Northern in 1975 against France, and at the 1975 Rugby League World Cup against Australia.

== Personal life ==
Redfearn is the older brother of the rugby league footballer; Alan Redfearn.
