= Jim Morgan (rugby league) =

Australia international rugby league footballer

Personal information
- Full name: David James Morgan
- Born: 13 June 1943 Maitland, New South Wales, Australia
- Died: 19 October 2005 (aged 62) Gold Coast, Queensland, Australia

Playing information
- Height: 6 ft 2 in (188 cm)
- Weight: 14 st 10 lb (93 kg; 206 lb)
- Position: Prop
Club
| Years | Team | Pld | T | G | FG | P |
|---|---|---|---|---|---|---|
| 1960–64 | Maitland | 103 |
| 1965–69 | South Sydney | 59 | 3 | 0 | 1 | 11 |
| 1970–72 | Eastern Suburbs | 52 | 7 | 0 | 0 | 21 |
| 1973–7? | Queanbeyan Blues |
| | Total | 214 | 10 | 0 | 1 | 32 |
Representative
| Years | Team | Pld | T | G | FG | P |
| | Newcastle |
| 1965–74 | New South Wales | 8 | 0 | 0 | 0 | 0 |
| 1964–75 | Country NSW | 3 | 0 | 0 | 0 | 0 |
| 1965–70 | Australia | 4 | 2 | 0 | 0 | 6 |

Jim Morgan ( 13 June 1943 – 19 October 2005) was an Australian rugby league footballer who played in the 1960s and 1970s. He played at prop in the New South Wales Rugby Football League premiership for the South Sydney Rabbitohs and later the Eastern Suburbs Roosters, and also represented Australia.

Morgan was born in Maitland, New South Wales on 13 June 1943., Morgan first came to prominence as a rugby league footballer in 1964 when playing for a representative Newcastle team that defeated premiers St. George on their way to winning that year's State Cup. The following year he was signed with South Sydney to play in the Sydney Premiership. In his first season with the Rabbitohs, he played in the 1965 NSWRFL season's Grand Final loss to St. George. Souths reached the 1968 NSWRFL season's grand final and Morgan played at prop in their victory over Manly-Warringah.

During the 1974 Great Britain Lions tour Morgan captained a Monaro team against the visitors.

== Sources ==
- https://web.archive.org/web/20080820025500/http://maitland.yourguide.com.au/news/local/sport/rugby-league/hall-of-fame-for-maitland-rugby-league-stalwart/772891.aspx
- http://www.yesterdayshero.com.au/PlayerProfile_Jim-Morgan_5884.aspx
- https://web.archive.org/web/20120919144039/http://news.ninemsn.com.au/article.aspx?id=67847
- https://web.archive.org/web/20080728222907/http://www.nrlstats.com/archive/players.cfm?PlayerID=5016
