= 1973–74 Lancashire Cup =

- Structure: Regional knockout championship
- Teams: 14
- Winners: Wigan
- Runners-up: Salford

The 1973–74 Lancashire Cup was the sixty-first occasion of the Lancashire Cup. Wigan won the trophy by beating Salford by the score of 19–9 in the final. The match was played at Wilderspool, Warrington. The attendance was 8,012 and receipts were £2,750.

== Background ==
The total number of teams entering the competition remained at last season’s total of 14 with no junior/amateur clubs taking part.
The same fixture format was retained, but due to the decrease in the number of participating clubs, resulted in one "blank" or "dummy" fixtures in the first round, and one bye in the second round.

== Competition and results ==
=== Round 1 ===
Involved 7 matches (with one "blank" fixture) and 14 clubs

Game No	Fixture date	Home team	Score	Away team	Venue	Att	Rec	Notes	Ref
1	Fri 31 August 1973	Barrow	4-24	Swinton	Craven Park	1,200			
2	Fri 31 September 1973	Salford	12-11	Widnes	The Willows	5,399			
3	Sat 1 September 1973	Huyton	12-29	Rochdale Hornets	Alt Park, Huyton	350			
4	Sat 1 September 1973	Oldham	12-20	Wigan	Watersheddings	2,410			
5	Sun 2 September 1973	Blackpool Borough	8-15	Whitehaven	Borough Park	850		1	
6	Sun 2 September 1973	Warrington	20-15	Leigh	Wilderspool	7,984			
7	Sun 2 September 1973	Workington Town	11-5	St. Helens	Derwent Park	1,800			
8		blank		blank					

=== Round 2 - Quarter-finals ===
Involved 3 matches (with one bye) and 7 clubs

Game No	Fixture date	Home team	Score	Away team	Venue	Att	Rec	Notes	Ref
1	Sat 8 September 1973	Workington Town	11-7	Swinton	Derwent Park	1,664			
2	Tue 11 September 1973	Whitehaven	19-8	Warrington	Recreation Ground	3,309			
3	Fri 4 September 1973	Salford	24-3	Rochdale Hornets	The Willows	6,365			
4		Wigan		bye					

=== Round 3 – Semi-finals ===
Involved 2 matches and 4 clubs

Game No	Fixture date	Home team	Score	Away team	Venue	Att	Rec	Notes	Ref
1	Thu 20 September 1973	Workington Town	4-20	Wigan	Derwent Park	3,040			
2	Tue 25 September 1973	Whitehaven	9-23	Salford	Recreation Ground	5,000			

=== Final ===
Game No	Fixture date	Home team	Score	Away team	Venue	Att	Rec	Notes	Ref
	Saturday 13 October 1973	Wigan	19-9	Salford	Wilderspool	8,012	2,750	2 3	

==== Teams and scorers ====
Wigan	№	Salford
	Teams	
Bill Francis	1	Paul Charlton
Green Vigo	2	Keith Fielding
David Hill	3	David Watkins
Keiron O'Loughlin	4	Chris Hesketh
Stuart Wright	5	Ian Holland
Terry Cassidy	6	Ken Gill
Warren Ayres	7	Peter Banner
Peter Smethurst	8	Graham Mackay
Colin Clarke	9	Peter Walker
John Gray	10	Doug Davies
Robert Irving	11	Barry Kear
Dave Robinson	12	Colin Dixon
Eddie Cunningham	13	Eric Prescott
?	14	John Knighton (for Kear 47 min)
?	15	Alan Grice (for Davies 65 min)
19	score	9
7	HT	4
	Scorers	
	Tries	
Keiron O'Loughlin (2)	T	David Watkins (1)
Stuart Wright (1)	T	
	Goals	
Warren Ayres (1)	G	David Watkins (3)
John Gray (4)	G	
Referee		W H (Billy) Thompson (Huddersfield)

Scoring - Try = three (3) points - Goal = two (2) points - Drop goal = two (2) points

=== The road to success ===
First round
Workington Town	11
St. Helens	5
Barrow	4
Swinton	24
Oldham	12
Wigan	20
blank
blank
Blackpool Borough	8
Whitehaven	15
Warrington	20
Leigh	15
Salford	12
Widnes	11
Huyton	12
Rochdale Hornets	29

Second round
Workington Town	11
Swinton	7
Wigan
bye
Whitehaven	19
Warrington	8
Salford	24
Rochdale Hornets	3

Semi-finals
Workington Town	4
Wigan	20
Whitehaven	9
Salford	23

Final
Wigan	19
Salford	9

== Notes and comments ==
1 * The John Player Yearbook 1974–75 gives the score as 8-15 (4 goals to 3 converted tries) - The RUGBYLEAGUEproject gives the score as 2-15
2 * The John Player Yearbook 1974–75 gives the attendance as 8,522 (HT 7-4) - The RUGBYLEAGUEproject gives the attendance as 8,556 - Other sources including the Rothmans Yearbook of 1991-92 show it as 8,012
3 * Wilderspool was the home ground of Warrington from 1883 to the end of the 2003 Summer season when they moved into the new purpose built Halliwell Jones Stadium. Wilderspool remained as a sports/Ruugby League ground and is/was used by Woolston Rovers/Warrington Wizards junior club.
The ground had a final capacity of 9,000 although the record attendance was set in a Challenge cup third round match on 13 March 1948 when 34,304 spectators saw Warrington lose to Wigan 10-13.

== See also ==
- British rugby league system
- 1973–74 Northern Rugby Football League season
- Rugby league county cups
- List of defunct rugby league clubs
