= Noel Cavanagh =

Australian rugby league player

Personal information
- Full name: Noel Martin Cavanagh
- Born: 29 March 1942 (age 84)

Playing information
- Position: Lock / Second-row
Club
Years	Team	Pld	T	G	FG	P
1968–72	North Sydney	78	5	66	0	147
1969	Bradford Northern	8	2	0	0	6
	Total	86	7	66	0	153
Representative
Years	Team	Pld	T	G	FG	P
1965	Queensland	3	0	2	0	4
1965	Australia

Noel Martin Cavanagh (29 March 1942 - 8 July 2026) was an Australian former rugby league player.

== Biography ==
Cavanagh was a lock and second-rower, originally from Clifton. He had several seasons in Brisbane playing for Brothers, from where he gained selection on Australia's 1965 tour of New Zealand. In 1967, Cavanagh won a premiership with Brothers, kicking all of his team's points in a try-less 6–2 grand final win over Northern Suburbs.

From 1968 to 1972, Cavanagh played his rugby league for North Sydney. He had a difficult start, breaking a hand in his first pre-season, then getting suspended for a stiff-arm tackle on his first-grade debut, but became an important player. At the end of the 1969 season, Cavanagh had a stint in England with Bradford Northern, playing under Gus Risman. He captained North Sydney during the 1971 season.

Cavanagh was appointed captain-coach of Bundaberg in 1973. He continued to live in Bundaberg after retiring and it was on his recommendation that North Sydney recruited local product Les Kiss. In 2008, Cavanagh was named as a lock in the Bundaberg Rugby League Team of the Century. He lived in Bundaberg until his death in 2026.
