= David Willicombe =

Welsh rugby league footballer (1951-2023)

Personal information
- Born: 11 March 1951 Cardiff, Wales
- Died: 29 March 2023 (aged 72)

Playing information

Rugby union
Club
Years	Team	Pld	T	G	FG	P
	Cardiff IAC

Rugby league
- Position: Centre
Club
Years	Team	Pld	T	G	FG	P
1969–74	Halifax	152	54	26	0	214
1974–80	Wigan	113	33	4	0	107
	Total	265	87	30	0	321
Representative
Years	Team	Pld	T	G	FG	P
1970–78	Wales	13	3	0	0	9
1974	Great Britain	3	2	0	0	6
1974–75	Other Nationalities	4	0	0	0	0

David Willicombe (11 March 1951 - 29 March 2023) was a Welsh rugby union and professional rugby league footballer who played in the 1960s, 1970s and 1980s. He played at representative level for Great Britain and Wales, and at club level for Halifax and Wigan, as a centre.

== Playing career ==
=== Club career ===
Willicombe initially played rugby union in Wales for Cardiff International Athletic Club. In 1969, he switched to rugby league, joining Halifax for a fee of £1,500. He was part of the team which won the 1971–72 Player's No.6 Trophy, scoring a try in the 22–11 win against Wakefield Trinity.

In January 1974, he was signed by Wigan for a fee of £12,000. He scored a hat-trick of tries on his debut against Lock Lane in the 1973–74 Challenge Cup.

Willicombe played right-centre and scored a try in Wigan's 13–16 defeat by Workington Town in the 1977 Lancashire Cup Final during the 1977–78 season at Wilderspool Stadium, Warrington, on Saturday 29 October 1977.

Willicombe retired from playing after suffering a number of serious arm injuries, but returned to play for Wigan during the 1980–81 season. He played right-centre in the 10–26 defeat by Warrington in the 1980 Lancashire Cup Final at Knowsley Road, St. Helens, on Saturday 4 October 1980. He retired for a second time a few weeks later.

=== Representative career ===
Willicombe won caps for Wales (RL) while at Halifax in 1970 against England, while at Wigan in 1975 against France, and England, in the 1975 Rugby League World Cup against France, England, Australia, New Zealand, New Zealand, and France, and in 1978 against France, England, and Australia, and won caps for Great Britain (RL) while at Wigan in 1974 against France (2 matches), and New Zealand.
