= Alan Bates (rugby league) =

GB international rugby league footballer

Personal information
- Born: fourth ¼ 1944 (age 81–82) Dewsbury district, England

Playing information
- Height: 5 ft 7 in (170 cm)
- Weight: 10 st 8 lb (148 lb; 67 kg)
- Position: Scrum-half
Club
Years	Team	Pld	T	G	FG	P
	Dewsbury
1977–79	Oldham RLFC	32	7	0	0	21
1980–81	Huddersfield		1	0	0	3
	Total	32	8	0	0	24
Representative
Years	Team	Pld	T	G	FG	P
1974	Great Britain	4	0	0	0	0

Alan Bates (birth registered fourth ¼ 1944) is a former professional rugby league footballer who played in the 1960s and 1970s. He played at representative level for Great Britain, and at club level for Dewsbury, Oldham RLFC and Huddersfield as a scrum-half.

== Background ==
Alan Bates' birth was registered in Dewsbury district, West Riding of Yorkshire, England.

== Playing career ==
=== International honours ===
Alan Bates won caps for Great Britain while at Dewsbury in 1974 against France (2 matches), and New Zealand (sub) (2 matches).

=== Championship final appearances ===
Alan Bates played scrum-half in Dewsbury's 22-13 victory over Leeds in the Championship Final during the 1972–73 season at Odsal Stadium, Bradford on Saturday 19 May 1973.

=== County Cup Final appearances ===
Alan Bates played scrum-half, and scored 3-goals in Dewsbury's 9-36 defeat by Leeds in the 1972–73 Yorkshire Cup Final during the 1972–73 season at Odsal Stadium, Bradford on Saturday 7 October 1972.

=== BBC2 Floodlit Trophy Final appearances ===
Alan Bates played scrum-half in Dewsbury's 2-22 defeat by St. Helens in the 1975 BBC2 Floodlit Trophy Final during the 1975-76 season at Knowsley Road, St. Helens on Tuesday 16 December 1975.

=== Testimonial match ===
Alan Bates' Testimonial match at Dewsbury took place in 1976.

== Genealogical information ==
Alan Bates is the brother of the rugby league footballer who played in the 1960s and 1970s for Great Britain (non-Test matches), and Dewsbury, John Bates.
