= Colin Dixon =

Welsh rugby league footballer and coach

Personal information
- Full name: Colin J. Dixon
- Born: 3 December 1943 Butetown, Cardiff, Wales
- Died: 21 June 1993 (aged 49) Halifax, West Yorkshire, England

Playing information
- Height: 5 ft 11 in (1.80 m)
- Weight: 15 st 6 lb (98 kg)

Rugby union
Club
| Years | Team | Pld | T | G | FG | P |
|---|---|---|---|---|---|---|
| 1961 | Cardiff IAC |

Rugby league
- Position: Centre, Second-row, Loose forward
Club
| Years | Team | Pld | T | G | FG | P |
|---|---|---|---|---|---|---|
| 1961–68 | Halifax | 245 | 73 | 0 | 0 | 219 |
| 1968–80 | Salford | 418 | 91 | 1 | 0 | 275 |
| 1980–81 | Hull Kingston Rovers | 24 | 1 | 0 | 0 | 3 |
| | Total | 687 | 165 | 1 | 0 | 497 |
Representative
| Years | Team | Pld | T | G | FG | P |
| 1963–81 | Wales | 16 | 2 | 0 | 0 | 6 |
| 1968–74 | Great Britain | 14 | 3 | 0 | 0 | 9 |
| 1974 | Other Nationalities | 1 | 1 | 0 | 0 | 3 |

Coaching information
Club
| Years | Team | Gms | W | D | L | W% |
| 1977–78 | Salford | 31 | 19 | 0 | 12 | 61 |
| 1982–84 | Halifax RLFC | 0 | 0 | 0 | 0 |
| 1986–89 | Keighley | 0 | 0 | 0 | 0 |
| | Total | 31 | 19 | 0 | 12 | 61 |
- Relatives: Chester Butler (grandson)

Colin J. Dixon (3 December 1943 – 21 June 1993) was a Welsh rugby league footballer who played in the 1960s, 1970s and 1980s, and coached in the 1970s. He played club level rugby union (RU) for Cardiff International Athletic Club, and representative level rugby league (RL) for Great Britain and Wales, and at club level for Halifax (captain), Salford and Hull Kingston Rovers. He played as a centre, second-row or loose forward, and coached club level rugby league (RL) for Salford, and is a Halifax Hall of Fame Inductee.

== Background ==
Dixon was born in Butetown, Cardiff, Wales, and he died aged 49 in Halifax, West Yorkshire.

== Rugby career ==
=== Halifax ===
Dixon, like Gus Risman and Billy Boston, was a product of South Church Street School in Cardiff's Butetown. Playing in the Cardiff RFC Youth team, he was already showing something of his future potential but was overlooked by Wales (RU) Youth. As a seventeen-year-old he signed for Halifax in 1961. Initially he played as a centre, providing many tries for his Wing John "Johnny" Freeman, by coincidence also a former pupil of South Church Street School, but it was not until he moved to the back row of the pack in 1963 that he revealed his tremendous power. Dixon played centre in Halifax's 10–0 victory over Featherstone Rovers in the 1963–64 Yorkshire Cup Final during the 1963–64 season at Belle Vue, Wakefield on Saturday 2 November 1963. In 1964 he was a key player in the first Halifax side to win the championship since 1907.

Dixon played in Halifax's 15–7 victory over St. Helens in the 1964–65 Championship Final during the 1964–65 season at Station Road, Swinton on Saturday 22 May 1965.

As Halifax's captain in the 1967 and 1968 seasons Dixon led the side by example and was rewarded with his first Great Britain cap in 1968.

=== Salford ===
Transferred a few weeks later to Salford for a record £15,000 (based on increases in average earnings, this would be approximately £431,500 in 2016), he played in the Challenge Cup Final of 1969 losing to Castleford. Had Salford won he would almost certainly have been awarded the Lance Todd Trophy. That same season he was the Championship's highest scoring forward with 20 tries.

Dixon played second-row in Salford's 25–11 victory over Swinton in the 1972–73 Lancashire Cup Final during the 1972–73 season at Wilderspool Stadium, Warrington on Saturday 21 October 1972, played second-row in the 9–19 defeat by Wigan in the 1973–74 Lancashire Cup Final during the 1973–74 season at Wilderspool Stadium, Warrington on Saturday 13 October 1973, played centre in the 2–6 defeat by Widnes in the 1974–75 Lancashire Cup Final during the 1974–75 season at Central Park, Wigan on Saturday 2 November 1974, and played prop in the 7–16 defeat by Widnes in the 1975–76 Lancashire Cup Final during the 1975–76 season at Central Park, Wigan on Saturday 4 October 1975.

Dixon played loose forward, and scored a try in Salford's 7–12 defeat by Leeds in the 1972–73 Player's No.6 Trophy Final during the 1972–73 season at Fartown Ground, Huddersfield on Saturday 24 March 1973.

Dixon played second-row in Salford's 0–0 draw with Warrington in the 1974 BBC2 Floodlit Trophy Final during the 1974–75 season at the Willows, Salford on Tuesday 17 December 1974, and played second-row in the 10–5 victory over Warrington in the 1974 BBC2 Floodlit Trophy Final replay during the 1974–75 season at Wilderspool Stadium, Warrington on Tuesday 28 January 1975.

He played his last game for Salford in 1980 before being sold to Hull Kingston Rovers for a fee of £4,000. He played for one season at the club, his last in professional rugby league, and helped the team reach the 1980–81 Challenge Cup final, although he did not play in the final itself. He played 418 times for Salford with 738 appearances in all first class games.

=== Representative honours ===
Dixon played in the Great Britain 1972 World Cup winning side and toured Australasia in 1974, playing in all three Tests against Australia (1 win, 2 losses) and all three in New Zealand (2 wins, 1 loss). Perhaps the highlight of his successful club career was winning the League Championship with Salford in 1973–74 and again in 1975–76. As an international he won 15 caps for Wales, and 14 for Great Britain. Only five players have played test matches for Great Britain as both a back, and a forward, they are; Colin Dixon, Frank Gallagher, Laurie Gilfedder, Billy Jarman and Harry Street.

=== Coaching career ===
Dixon had a brief spell as player-coach at Salford in 1977–78. After retiring as a player, he went on to coach Halifax (1982–84) and Keighley (1986–89). He later returned to Halifax to coach the academy team.

== Personal life ==
Dixon's son, Paul, played rugby league for Keighley, and became superintendent of the Airedale and North Bradford police division. His daughter, Michelle, married the former West Ham United footballer, Peter Butler.

Dixon's grandson, Chester Butler, was a member of the Wales squad for the 2017 Rugby League World Cup.
