= David Watkins (rugby) =

Welsh rugby footballer (1942–2023)

David Watkins MBE
Personal information
- Full name: David Watkins
- Born: 5 March 1942 Blaina, Monmouthshire, Wales
- Died: 3 September 2023 (aged 81)

Playing information
- Height: 5 ft 6 in (1.68 m)
- Weight: 10 st 3 lb (143 lb; 65 kg)

Rugby union
- Position: Fly half
Club
Years	Team	Pld	T	G	FG	P
	Abertillery
	Ebbw Vale
	Pontypool
1961–1968	Newport	202	32	14	55	294
	Total	202	32	14	55	294
Representative
Years	Team	Pld	T	G	FG	P
1963–67	Wales	21	2	14	3	15
1966	British and Irish Lions	6	2		2	12
1962–67	Crawshays
	Glamorgan
	Monmouthshire
1962	Barbarians

Rugby league
- Position: Three-quarter back, Fullback
Club
Years	Team	Pld	T	G	FG	P
1967–79	Salford	405+2	147	1225	16	2907
1979–80	Swinton	20	2	19	9	53
1982	Cardiff City	2+2	0	0	0	0
	Total	431	149	1244	25	2960
Representative
Years	Team	Pld	T	G	FG	P
1968–79	Wales	16	2	34	4	74
1971–74	Great Britain	6	0	3	0	6
1975	Wales tour	5+1	1	17	0	37
1974	GB tour	5+2	2	11	0	25

Coaching information
Club
Years	Team	Gms	W	D	L	W%
1981–84	Cardiff City
Representative
Years	Team	Gms	W	D	L	W%
1977	Great Britain	4	2	0	2	50
1976–77	Wales	1	1	0	0	100
1982–85	Wales	2	0	0	2	0

David Watkins MBE (5 March 1942 – 3 September 2023) was a Welsh dual-code rugby international, having played both rugby union and rugby league football for both codes' national teams between 1963 and 1979. He captained the British and Irish Lions rugby union side, and made six appearances for the Great Britain rugby league team. With the Wales national rugby league team he played in every match of the 1975 World Cup, and with English club Salford he played more than 400 games over 12 seasons.

== Background ==
Watkins was born in Blaina, Monmouthshire, Wales, he played rugby union for Cwmcelyn Youth, as well as occasional games for Abertillery RFC Ebbw Vale RFC and Pontypool RFC, becoming a Wales Youth International.

== Rugby career ==
=== Rugby union ===
Joining Newport RFC in 1961, he made his début for Newport on 2 September that year against Penarth RFC. In his first season with Newport the team won the Welsh Championship. Watkins played for invitational team the Barbarians during his first season for Newport in 1962.

Watkins made his international début in 1963, at the age of 20, for Wales against England partnering Clive Rowlands. He was a key figure in Newport's win over Whineray's 1963 New Zealand All Blacks. He was vice captain of Newport under Brian Price in 1963–64 and went on to captain them for three seasons 1964–65, 1965–66 and 1966–67. He set the club dropped goal record of 14 in 1966–67. In all he scored 228 points including 55 dropped goals for Newport. He never played on the losing side for Newport at sevens. In 1967 Watkins assembled his own team to enter the first ever Glengarth Sevens at Davenport Rugby Club where he won the main competition.

Watkins led the Lions in two tests in New Zealand in 1966. He set up position for Uzzell's drop goal and kicked a penalty to draw with Australia in 1966. He played 21 times for Wales (including the 1964–65 Triple Crown) and was captain three times in 1967.

Wales
Against	Years
England	1963, 1964, 1965, 1966, 1967
Ireland	1963, 1964, 1965, 1966, 1967
France	1963, 1964, 1965, 1966, 1967
New Zealand	1963
Scotland	1963, 1964, 1965, 1966
South Africa	1964

=== Rugby league ===
In October 1967 Watkins signed to play rugby league, joining English club Salford for £16,000, a then club record. He was signed the same day as outstanding young talent Jimmy Newbrook. He was Salford's captain in 1967 and also in the Challenge Cup Final in 1969 when they were beaten by Castleford.

Watkins became Salford's record points scorer and steered them to victory in the Lancashire Cup Final in 1972 by beating Swinton at Wilderspool Stadium, Warrington. In the 1972–73 season he kicked a world record 221 goals in a season. He also holds the longest scoring run record in 92 consecutive matches for Salford from 19 August 1972 to 25 April 1974. Watkins totalled 929 points from 41 tries and 403 goals. The record refers to scoring consecutively for one club and does not include representative matches.

During the 1972–73 League season Watkins played at centre and kicked two conversions in Salford's 12–7 defeat by Leeds in the Player's No.6 Trophy Final at Fartown, Huddersfield on Saturday 24 March 1973.

Watkins played at centre and scored a try, and five conversions in Salford's 25–11 victory over Swinton in the 1972 Lancashire Cup Final at Wilderspool Stadium, Warrington on Saturday 21 October 1972, played at centre and scored a try, and three conversions in the 9–19 defeat by Wigan in the 1973 Lancashire Cup Final at Wilderspool Stadium, Warrington on Saturday 13 October 1973. During the 1973 Kangaroo tour of Great Britain and France, Watkins was selected to play for Great Britain against Australia in the 3rd Ashes Test as a reserve. He led Salford to the Championship in 1974.

In October 1974, Watkins decided to retire from rugby league, but was persuaded to return by Salford three months later. He played at centre and scored two conversions in the 10–5 victory over Warrington in the 1974 BBC2 Floodlit Trophy Final replay at Wilderspool Stadium, Warrington on Tuesday 28 January 1975. He played in all eight of Wales' matches in the 1975 Rugby League World Cup tournament. For the 1975–76 Northern Rugby Football League season Salford won the Championship by finishing as League Leaders but lost the Premiership Final. Watkins played for Salford at fullback, kicking two drop goals in the defeat by St. Helens. He finished that season as the League's top point scorer. Watkins' Testimonial match at Salford took place in 1977.

During the 1975–76 Northern Rugby Football League season Watkins played at fullback, and scored two conversions in the 7–16 defeat by Widnes in the 1975 Lancashire Cup Final at Central Park, Wigan on Saturday 4 October 1975. Watkins retired having set Salford's "Most Career Points" record with 2,907 points, and is one of fewer than ten Welshmen to have scored more than 2,000 points in their rugby league career. Watkins' rugby league career ended in 1979 after playing for Swinton for a season. He'd also played six international rugby league matches against New Zealand, Australia and France, and both captained and coached Great Britain and Wales.

During the 1978 Kangaroo tour of Great Britain and France, Watkins was selected to captain Wales from fullback in their one-off Test match against the Australians, scoring all of the home side's points in their 3–8 loss at St. Helen's Rugby and Cricket Ground in Swansea.

In the 1986 New Year Honours, Watkins was appointed a Member of the Order of the British Empire (MBE) for services to rugby league football.

== Coaching career ==
=== International ===
After he'd stopped playing Watkins coached rugby league. He was the Wales national team coach and also coached Great Britain, taking them to the 1977 World Cup Final, which they lost by one point to the hosts, Australia. Watkins had two stints in the Wales head coach role, separated by 7 years.

=== Cardiff City Blue Dragons ===
Watkins coached in Wales for the Cardiff City club.

== Administration ==
Watkins was appointed Newport RFC team manager in 1992–93 and later became the club's chairman when he was awarded an MBE. In 2006 Watkins, along with Falklands War hero Simon Weston, was installed as a patron of the Welsh Rugby League at a ceremony held in the Welsh Assembly. He was managing director of the Cardiff City Blue Dragons. In 2009, Watkins took over the position of Crusaders president from Jonathan Davies.

== Death ==
David Watkins died on 3 September 2023, at the age of 81.

Sporting positions
Preceded by John Mantle; 1981	Coach Cardiff Blue Dragons; 1981–1984	Succeeded by Reformed as Bridgend Blue Dragons
