= Bill Ramsey (rugby league) =

Great Britain international rugby league footballer and coach (1943–2020)

Personal information
- Full name: William Ramsey
- Born: 27 September 1943; Leeds district, England
- Died: 6 July 2020 (aged 76)

Playing information
- Position: Prop, Second-row, Loose forward
Club
Years	Team	Pld	T	G	FG	P
1962–67	Hunslet	125	26	0	0	78
1967–74	Leeds	197	39	7	0	131
1974	Bradford Northern	30	6	15	0	48
1975–76	Hull FC	34	4	7	4	30
1976–78	Widnes	58	9	0	0	27
	Total	444	84	29	4	314
Representative
Years	Team	Pld	T	G	FG	P
1965	Commonwealth XIII	1	0	0	0	0
1965–74	Yorkshire	8	0	0	0	0
1965–74	Great Britain	8	0	0	0	0

Coaching information
Club
Years	Team	Gms	W	D	L	W%
1978–79	Hunslet
- Relatives: Anne Ramsey (Cousin)

William Ramsey (27 September 1943 – 7 July 2020) was an English professional rugby league footballer who played as a prop, second-row or loose forward in the 1960s and 1970s, and coached in the 1970s. He played at representative level for Great Britain, Yorkshire, and Commonwealth XIII, and at club level for Hunslet F.C., Leeds, Bradford Northern, Hull FC and Widnes, and coached at club level for New Hunslet. During his Leeds career Ramsey appeared in 17 major Finals, including five at Wembley Stadium, London, scored a rare drop goal in the 1969 Championship Final, toured twice in 1966 and 1974, and won seven winners medals with Leeds.

== Background ==
Ramsey's was born in Leeds.

== Playing career ==
=== Hunslet ===
Ramsey played at second-row in Hunslet's 16–20 defeat by Wigan in the 1965 Challenge Cup Final at Wembley Stadium, London, on Saturday 8 May 1965, in front of a crowd of 89,016. Ramsey represented Commonwealth XIII in 1965 against New Zealand at Crystal Palace National Recreation Centre, London on Wednesday 18 August 1965, Ramsey won caps for Great Britain while at Hunslet in 1965 against New Zealand (2 matches), in 1966 against France, Australia (2 matches), and New Zealand (2 matches),

Ramsey played at second-row in Hunslet's 8–17 defeat by Bradford Northern in the 1965 Yorkshire Cup Final Headingley, Leeds on Saturday 16 October 1965.

=== Leeds ===
Ramsey was transferred from Hunslet to Leeds in 1967 for £10,000, he made his début, and scored a try for Leeds against Keighley on Friday 8 December 1967.

Ramsey played, and scored a drop goal in Leeds' 16–14 victory over Castleford in the Championship Final during the 1968–69 season at Odsal Stadium, Bradford on Saturday 24 May 1969. During Bill Ramsey's time at Leeds there was a 9–5 victory over St. Helens in the Championship Final during the 1971–72 season.

Ramsey played in Leeds' victories in the Yorkshire League during the 1967–68 season, 1968–69 season and 1969–70 season.

Ramsey played at second-row in Leeds' 11–10 victory over Wakefield Trinity in the 1968 Challenge Cup Finale (the "Watersplash" final) at Wembley Stadium] on Saturday 11 May 1968, played loose forward in the 7–24 defeat by Leigh in the 1971 Challenge Cup at Wembley Stadium on Saturday 15 May 1971, in front of a crowd of 85,514, and played at prop in the 13–16 defeat by St. Helens in the 1972 Challenge Cup Final at Wembley on Saturday 13 May 1972, in front of a crowd of 89,495.

Ramsey played at second-row (replaced by substitute Merv Hicks) in Leeds' 22–11 victory over Castleford in the 1968 Yorkshire Cup Final at Belle Vue, Wakefield on Saturday 19 October 1968, played at second-row and scored a try in the 23–7 victory over Featherstone Rovers in the 1970 Yorkshire Cup Final at Odsal Stadium, Bradford on Saturday 21 November 1970, played at prop in the 36–9 victory over Dewsbury in the 1972 Yorkshire Cup Final at Odsal on Saturday 7 October 1972, and was a substitute in the 7–2 victory over Wakefield Trinity in the 1973 Yorkshire Cup Final at Headingley on Saturday 20 October 1973.

Ramsey played at second-row in Leeds' 9–5 victory over St. Helens in the 1970 BBC2 Floodlit Trophy Final at Headingley on Tuesday 15 December 1970.

=== Bradford Northern ===
Ramsey signed for Bradford Northern on 27 January 1974, he stayed at the club until 8 September that year.

=== Hull ===
Ramsey spent the 1975–76 Northern Rugby Football League season with Hull F.C.

Ramsey played at prop in Hull's 13–19 defeat by Widnes in the 1975–76 Player's No.6 Trophy final at Headingley on Saturday 24 January 1976.

=== Widnes ===
Ramsey played at prop in Widnes' 13–16 defeat by Leeds in the 1977 Challenge Cup final at Wembley on Saturday 7 May 1977.

Ramsey played at prop in Widnes' 16–11 victory over Workington Town in the 1976 Lancashire Cup final at Central Park, Wigan on Saturday 30 October 1976.

Ramsey played at prop in Widnes' 4–9 defeat by Warrington in the 1977–78 Player's No.6 Trophy final at Knowsley Road, St. Helens on Saturday 28 January 1978.

=== International honours ===
Ramsey won caps for Great Britain while at Leeds in 1974 against New Zealand.

== Coaching career ==
After retiring from playing Ramsey returned to New Hunslet as coach in 1978 and coached the team to promotion to the First Division in 1979.

== Personal life ==
Ramsey married Marlene Crabtree and they had two sons.
