= Ken Gill (rugby league) =

Great Britain and England rugby league player (1948–2024)

Personal information
- Full name: Kenneth Gill
- Born: 2 April 1948 St. Helens district, England
- Died: 13 November 2024 (aged 76)

Playing information
- Position: Stand-off
Club
Years	Team	Pld	T	G	FG	P
1970–78	Salford	240+4	60	9	1	199
1978	Widnes	17	8	0	0	24
1978–79	Barrow	3+3	0	0	0	0
1979–80	Salford	31	2	0	0	6
	Total	298	70	9	1	229
Representative
Years	Team	Pld	T	G	FG	P
1975–77	England	10+2	5	0	0	15
1974–77	Great Britain	5+2	3	0	0	9
1974–77	Lancashire	7	2	0	0	6

Kenneth Gill (2 April 1948 – 13 November 2024) was an English professional rugby league footballer who played in the 1970s and 1980s. He played at representative level for Great Britain and England, and at club level for Salford (two spells), Widnes and Barrow, as a stand-off.

== Playing career ==
=== Championship appearances ===
Gill played in Widnes' victory in the Championship during the 1977–78 season.

=== County Cup Final appearances ===
Gill played stand-off in Salford's 25-11 victory over Swinton in the 1972 Lancashire Cup Final during the 1972–73 season at Wilderspool Stadium, Warrington on Saturday 21 October 1972, played stand-off in the 9-19 defeat by Wigan in the 1973 Lancashire Cup Final during the 1973–74 season at Wilderspool Stadium, Warrington on Saturday 13 October 1973, and played stand-off in the 7-16 defeat by Widnes in the 1975 Lancashire Cup Final during the 1975–76 season at Central Park, Wigan on Saturday 4 October 1975.

=== BBC2 Floodlit Trophy Final appearances ===
Gill did not play (Tom Brophy played stand-off) in Salford's 0-0 draw with Warrington in the 1974 BBC2 Floodlit Trophy Final during the 1974–75 season at The Willows, Salford on Tuesday 17 December 1974, and played stand-off in the 10-5 victory over Warrington in the 1974 BBC2 Floodlit Trophy Final replay during the 1974–75 season at Wilderspool Stadium, Warrington on Tuesday 28 January 1975.

=== Player's No.6 Trophy Final appearances ===
Gill played stand-off (replaced by substitute P. Ward) in Salford's 7-12 defeat by Leeds in the 1972–73 Player's No.6 Trophy Final during the 1972–73 season at Fartown Ground, Huddersfield on Saturday 24 March 1973.

=== International honours ===
Gill won caps for England while at Salford in 1975 against Wales, in the 1975 Rugby League World Cup against France, Wales (sub), New Zealand (scoring a hat-trick of tries), Australia (sub), Wales, France, New Zealand, Australia, and Australia, and in 1977 against Wales, and France, and won caps for Great Britain while at Salford in 1974 against France (2 matches), Australia (2 matches), and New Zealand, and in the 1977 Rugby League World Cup against France (sub), and Australia (sub).

== Personal life ==
His nephew Mike Worsley played rugby union for England.

== Death ==
Gill died on 13 November 2024, at the age of 76.
