= John Gray (English sportsman) =

GB & England international rugby league & union footballer, and cricketer

Personal information
- Full name: John Denis Gray
- Born: 9 October 1948 (age 78) Meriden, Warwickshire, England
- Cricket career

Cricket information
- Batting: Left-handed
- Bowling: Left-arm fast-medium

Domestic team information
- Years: Team
- 1968–69: Warwickshire

Sport

Rugby union career
- Position: Hooker
Senior career
Years	Team	Apps	(Points)
19??–73	Coventry		
National sevens team
Years	Team		Comps
1973	England		
- Rugby league career

Playing information
- Position: Hooker, Prop, Second-row
Club
Years	Team	Pld	T	G	FG	P
1973–75	Wigan	60	6	122	0	262
1975–77	North Sydney	44	5	112	0	259
1978–80	Manly-Warringah	50	4	68	0	148
1981–83	North Sydney	44	5	96	0	209
	Total	198	20	398	0	878
Representative
Years	Team	Pld	T	G	FG	P
1974	Other Nationalities	1	1	0	0	3
1974	Great Britain	8	1	18	1	40
1975	England	3	0	4	0	8

John Denis Gray (born 9 October 1948) is an English cricketer, rugby union and professional rugby league footballer who played in the 1970s and 1980s. He played cricket for Warwickshire and Marylebone Cricket Club, as a left-hand bat, and right-arm medium-fast bowler, playing representative rugby union (RU) for England (7s), and at club level for Coventry R.F.C., as a Hooker and representative rugby league (RL) for Great Britain and England, and at club level for Wigan, North Sydney Bears (two spells) and Manly-Warringah Sea Eagles as a round the corner style goal-kicking prop, hooker, second-row or loose forward.

== Background ==
Gray was born in Meriden, Warwickshire, England on 9 October 1948. He was a pupil at Woodlands Comprehensive School, Coventry. At the age of 17, he was offered the chance to sign for football club Coventry City, but turned it down to continue his education instead.

== Career ==
Gray played cricket at county level for Warwickshire, taking a five-wicket haul on debut in 1968.

He represented England in rugby union in their 1971 tour of the Far East and in the 1973 International Seven-A-Side Tournament.

Gray switched to rugby league with English club Wigan in July 1973, and played at prop, scoring 4 conversions in their 19–9 victory over Salford in the 1973 Lancashire Cup Final during the 1973–74 season at Wilderspool Stadium, Warrington, on Saturday 13 October 1973. Gray won caps for England (RL) while at Wigan in 1975 against France, and Wales, in the 1975 Rugby League World Cup against France, and won caps for Great Britain (RL) while at Wigan in 1974 against France (sub) (2 matches), Australia (2 matches), Australia (sub), and New Zealand (3 matches).

Gray signed a three-year contract with Australian club North Sydney in March 1975. Along with Bill Ashurst, he was one of the first players to introduce the now routine round-the-corner style of goal kicking to Australia. He played for North Sydney in the final of the 1976 Amco Cup, and although he was on the losing side, he received an individual award as player of the competition.

After three seasons with North Sydney, he signed a three-year contract with Manly-Warringah. He helped the club reach the finals of the 1978 NSWRFL season, but was sent off in the semi-final against Parramatta, and the resulting suspension ruled him out of both the grand final and Manly's victory in the replay.

He returned to North Sydney in 1981, and was the 1982 Dally M Award-winning hooker. A series of broken forearms, and constant back pain ended his career in 1983.

After ending his playing career, Gray remained in Australia and set up a plastics business in Sydney. In 2001, he suffered a freak accident while running up some stairs, which left him paralysed. He recovered enough to be able to walk again after months of rehabilitation.

In 2006, Gray was named on the bench in the North Sydney Bears Team of the Century.

== See also ==
- List of cricket and rugby league players
