= Keith Harris (rugby league) =

Australian rugby league player

Personal information
- Full name: Keith Harris
- Born: 10 October 1952 (age 74) Tamworth, New South Wales, Australia

Playing information
- Position: Centre, Second-row
Club
Years	Team	Pld	T	G	FG	P
1973–74	North Sydney Bears	42	7	0	0	21
1975–76	Canterbury-Bankstown	40	9	0	0	27
1977–83	North Sydney Bears	113	13	9	1	58
	Total	195	29	9	1	106

Keith Harris (born 10 October 1952) is an Australian former professional rugby league footballer who played in the 1970s and 1980s. He played for the North Sydney Bears, Canterbury-Bankstown and for the New South Wales Rugby League team, as a second-row or lock.

== Playing career ==
A former Tamworth junior, Keith Harris represented New South Wales rugby league team twice in 1975 during his two years at Canterbury (1975-1976). He then returned to North Sydney for another seven seasons. Following that he retired from the Sydney competition and played for the Aberdeen Tigers for two years and won one premiership. The Werris Creek Magpies and won one premiership. The Asquith Magpies to be beaten in the Grand Final, the Southport Tigers with one premiership and coached the Tweed Head Seagulls. He was also the manager of the Burleigh Bears Colts.

Harris played a total of 9 seasons at North Sydney between 1973-1974 and 1977–1983. During this period, he captained the North Sydney club on numerous occasions. He retired at the end of the 1983 season.

He scored 29 tries, kicked nine goals and one field goal for a total of 106 points during his 11-year NSWRFL career.
