= Warren Orr (rugby league) =

Australian rugby league footballer

Playing information
- Position: Wing
Representative
Years	Team	Pld	T	G	FG	P
1972–75	Queensland	13	1	0	0	3
1974	Australia	2	1	0	0	3

Warren Orr is an Australian former rugby league footballer.

Originally from Atherton in Far North Queensland, Orr was active in Brisbane rugby league during the 1970s, playing for Wests and Wynnum-Manly. He was a winger on the Queensland state team from 1972 to 1975.

Orr toured Great Britain and France with Australia in 1973, featuring in several uncapped matches. The following year, Orr broke into the starting line-up for the 1st Test against Great Britain at Lang Park and scored the match's only try in a 12–6 win. He remained in the side for the 2nd Test in Sydney.
