= Jeff Shield =

Australian rugby league footballer

Personal information
- Full name: Jeffrey James Shield
- Born: Newcastle, New South Wales, Australia
- Died: 2 November 2009 (aged 56)

Playing information
- Position: Five-eighth
Club
Years	Team	Pld	T	G	FG	P
1972–76	Balmain Tigers	71	11	0	0	33
1974–75	Leigh	9	1	0	0	3
1977	North Sydney Bears	7	0	0	0	0
	Total	87	12	0	0	36
- Source: As of 30 July 2021

Jeff Shield (1953–2009) was an Australian professional rugby league footballer who played in the 1970s. He played for the Balmain Tigers and North Sydney Bears in the New South Wales Rugby League competition. He primarily played at five-eighth.

Shield started playing football with the Waratah-Mayfield club, in the Newcastle area, at the age of 6. He excelled early, and was chosen for New South Wales Primary Schools when they toured Queensland in 1965. Later, he was selected for NSW Combined High Schools in 1969, 1970 and 1971. He was made captain in 1971.

In 1972, Shield signed with the Balmain Tigers at only eighteen years of age. He played just ten lower grade games before making his début at halfback.

Shield played for New South Wales in a match against the touring Great Britain side in 1974, scoring a try. At the end of that season, he played the 1974-75 off-season with the Leigh RLFC in England.

Shield played two more years with the Tigers before joining the Bears for the 1977 season. He then returned to the Newcastle area to play with Macquarie United.

Jeff Shield died on 2 November 2009.
