= Jim Mills (rugby) =

GB & Wales international rugby league player

Personal information
- Born: 24 September 1944 (age 81) Aberdare, Rhondda Cynon Taff, Wales

Playing information
- Height: 6 ft 4 in (193 cm)
- Weight: 17 st 13 lb (114 kg)

Rugby union
Club
Years	Team	Pld	T	G	FG	P
1963–65	Cardiff	16	2	0	0	6

Rugby league
- Position: Prop
Club
Years	Team	Pld	T	G	FG	P
1965–68	Halifax	37+1	6	0	0	18
1968	Salford	4+1	0	0	0	0
1968–70	Bradford Northern	50+2	6	0	0	18
1970–72	North Sydney	37	8	0	0	24
1972–76	Widnes	94+1	14	0	0	42
1976–77	Workington Town	23	3	0	0	9
1977–80	Widnes	88+5	25	0	0	75
	Total	343	62	0	0	186
Representative
Years	Team	Pld	T	G	FG	P
1974–79	Great Britain	6	0	0	0	0
1969–79	Wales	17	3	0	0	9
1974	Other Nationalities	1	0	0	0	0
1974–79	GB tour games	16+1	4	0	0	12
1975	Wales tour games	3+1	1	0	0	3
- Relatives: David Mills (son)

Jim Mills (born 24 September 1944) is a Welsh former rugby union, and professional rugby league footballer who played in the 1960s, 1970s and 1980s. A Wales and Great Britain international representative prop, "Big Jim" as he was known, played club rugby in England with Halifax, Salford, Bradford Northern, Widnes (two spells) (with whom he won two Challenge Cups) and Workington Town, and also in Australia for North Sydney. He is the father of former Widnes forward David Mills.

== Background ==
Jim Mills was born in Aberdare on 29 September 1944. He originally played rugby union in Wales with Cardiff before turning professional.

== Professional playing career ==
Mills started playing rugby league in 1965 for English club Halifax. He withdrew from the 1970 Great Britain Lions tour to instead move to Australia to play for Notyh Sydney. In 1972 he started playing for Widnes. Mills played left-prop in Widnes' 0–5 defeat by Leigh in the 1972 BBC2 Floodlit Trophy Final during the 1972–73 season at Central Park, Wigan on Tuesday 19 December 1972.

Mills won caps for Great Britain during the 1974 Great Britain Lions tour against Australia (2 matches) and New Zealand. During the 1974–75 season he played at prop in Widnes' 6–2 victory over Salford in the 1974 Lancashire Cup Final at Central Park, Wigan on Saturday 2 November 1974. Mills played left-prop in Widnes' 2–3 defeat by Bradford Northern in the 1974–75 Player's No.6 Trophy Final at Wilderspool Stadium, Warrington on Saturday 25 January 1975. He played left-prop and scored a try in Widnes' 14–7 victory over Warrington in the 1975 Challenge Cup Final during the 1974–75 season at Wembley Stadium, London on Saturday 10 May 1975.

After a strong display in Wales' victory over England in the 1975 World Series in Brisbane, Sydney's Manly-Warringah and Canterbury-Bankstown clubs were keen to get the prop's signature. Mills was banned for the rest of the season after stomping on John Greengrass' head in the 25–24 win over New Zealand at Swansea in the same tournament. The ban was eventually lifted on 2 January 1976; however, Mills remained banned for life by the New Zealand Rugby League.

Mills played left-prop in the 16–7 victory over Salford in the 1975 Lancashire Cup Final during the 1975–76 season at Central Park, Wigan on Saturday 4 October 1975.

He played left-prop in the 19–13 victory over Hull F.C. in the 1975–76 Player's No.6 Trophy Final during the 1975–76 season at Headingley, Leeds on Saturday 24 January 1976. He played left-prop in Workington Town's 11–16 defeat by Widnes in the 1976 Lancashire Cup Final during the 1976–77 season at Central Park, Wigan on Saturday 30 October 1976, and played left-prop in Widnes' 15–13 victory over Workington Town in the 1978 Lancashire Cup Final during the 1978–79 season at Central Park, Wigan on Saturday 7 October 1978.

Mills played right-prop in the 13–7 victory over St. Helens in the 1978 BBC2 Floodlit Trophy Final during the 1978–79 season at Knowsley Road, St. Helens on Tuesday 12 December 1978.

Mills played prop in the 12–3 victory over Wakefield Trinity in the 1979 Challenge Cup Final during the 1978–79 season at Wembley Stadium, London on Saturday 5 May 1979. He played for Great Britain again in 1978 and '79 against Australia. He went on the 1979 Great Britain Lions tour, playing one test against Australia. Mills was selected to play at prop forward for Great Britain in all three Ashes tests of the 1978 Kangaroo tour of Great Britain and France. He also played in Widnes' victory over the touring Australian side. The Open Rugby inaugural World XIII was revealed in June 1978 and included Mills. He played left-prop in the 16–4 victory over Warrington in the 1978–79 John Player Trophy Final at Knowsley Road, St. Helens on Saturday 28 April 1979, and appeared as a substitute (replacing Prop Brian Hogan) in the 0–6 defeat by Bradford Northern in the 1979–80 John Player Trophy Final at Headingley, Leeds on Saturday 5 January 1980.

== Post-playing ==
Mills was also one of the original thirteen former Widnes players inducted into the Widnes Hall of Fame in 1992. That year he also worked as team manager for the Welsh national team. Jim Mills is the father of the rugby league footballer; David Mills.

== Honours ==
- Open Rugby World XIII: 1978
