= Geoff Richardson (rugby) =

- Born: Geoffrey Colin Richardson; 17 April 1949 (age 77) Taree, New South Wales

Rugby union career
- Position: Fly-half
International career
Years	Team	Apps	(Points)
1971–1973	Australia	9	(10)
- Correct as of 31 December 2007
- Rugby league career

Playing information
- Position: Five-eighth
Club
Years	Team	Pld	T	G	FG	P
1974–76	Wests Panthers
Representative
Years	Team	Pld	T	G	FG	P
1974	Australia	2

Geoffrey Colin Richardson (born 17 April 1949) is an Australian former national representative rugby league and rugby union footballer – a dual-code international. He played union at fly-half and league at five-eighth.

== Rugby union ==
His club rugby was played with the Army Club, Townsville before moving to Brisbane in 1972 and the Teachers club from where he continued to be selected to the Wallabies. His Test debut was against the Springboks in Sydney in July 1971. He represented in nine Tests from 1971 to 1973 and captained Australia in one minor match in 1971.

New South Wales teams

- Goulburn RUFC (ACT/Monaro Rugby Union) 1968, 69
- ACT Representative Team – NSWCRU Country Week 1968, 69
- New South Wales 1969

Queensland teams

- Army Rugby Club (Townsville & District Rugby Union) 1970, 71
- TDRU Representative Team – QCRU Country Carnival 1971
- Queensland Country 1971
- Teachers Rugby Club (Brisbane) 1972, 73
- Queensland 1971, 72, 73

== Rugby league ==
Switching to the professional code in 1974 Richardson played his club football in the Brisbane Rugby League premiership with the Western Suburbs club. He gained representative honours for Queensland and Australia in the first and second Test of 1974 against the visiting Great Britain side. His international rugby league debut against Great Britain in Brisbane in June 1974 saw him become Australia's 37th dual code rugby international following Steve Knight and preceding Ray Price. After Australia's 16–11 loss in the second Test Richardson was replaced in the third by Tim Pickup. He did not regain Test selection.

Richardson played at five-eighth in back-to-back Brisbane Rugby League grand final victories in 1975 and 1976.

Queensland teams

- Western Suburbs (Brisbane) 1974, 75•, 76•
- Queensland 1974, 75

• BRL 'A' Grade Premiers

== Sources ==
=== Bibliography ===
- Howell, Max (2005) Born to Lead – Wallaby Test Captains, Celebrity Books, Auckland NZ
- Whiticker, Alan & Hudson, Glen (2006) The Encyclopedia of Rugby League Players, Gavin Allen Publishing, Sydney
