= Steve McKenzie =

Australian rugby league footballer

Personal information
- Born: 13 April 1954 (age 70); Woy Woy, New South Wales

Playing information
- Position: Fullback
Club
Years	Team	Pld	T	G	FG	P
1981–82	Parramatta Eels	34	8	0	5	29

Steve McKenzie (born 13 April 1954) is an Australian former professional rugby league footballer who played in the 1980s. McKenzie played at fullback, and was a part of Parramatta's maiden premiership-winning team in 1981. The following season, he was demoted by coach Jack Gibson, and resumed playing local rugby league on the New South Wales south coast.
