= Mick Ryan (rugby league) =

Australian rugby league footballer

Personal information
- Full name: Mick Ryan
- Born: 17 September 1953 (age 72) Tweed Heads, New South Wales, Australia

Playing information
- Position: Centre, Wing
Club
Years	Team	Pld	T	G	FG	P
1975–78	Canterbury Bankstown	57	12	0	0	36
1979–82	Newtown	84	22	0	0	66
1983	Eastern Suburbs	15	5	0	0	20
	Total	156	39	0	0	122
- Source: Whiticker/Hudson
- Father: Peter Ryan

Mick Ryan is an Australian former rugby league footballer who played in the 1970s and 1980s. He played for Canterbury-Bankstown, Newtown and Eastern Suburbs as a centre and occasionally as a winger.

== Early life ==
Ryan was born and raised at Tweed Heads on the New South Wales North Coast. Ryan played his junior rugby league in the region before gaining the attention of Canterbury-Bankstown who signed him in 1974. Ryan is the son of former Newtown player Peter Ryan who played for the club in the 1950s.

== Playing career ==
Ryan made his first grade debut against St George in 1975. Ryan made 57 appearances for the club over 4 years with Canterbury regularly making the finals. In 1979, Ryan joined Newtown. Under coach Warren Ryan, Newtown went from strugglers and easy beats of the competition to title contenders and in 1981 made their first grand final in 26 years against Parramatta. Ryan played at centre in the match as Newtown took a shock lead going into the second half before Parramatta stormed home to win their first premiership 20-10. Ryan spent one further season before joining Eastern Suburbs in 1983. Ryan played one season with Eastern Suburbs for retiring. In 2004, Ryan was nominated for the Berries to Bulldogs 70 Year Team of Champions.
