= Murray Wright =

New Zealand international rugby league footballer

Personal information
- Full name: Murray Thomas Wright
- Born: 7 December 1953 (age 71); New Zealand

Playing information
- Position: Hooker
Club
Years	Team	Pld	T	G	FG	P
	Otahuhu Leopards
1974–75	Bramley
	Hornby Panthers
	Total	0	0	0	0	0
Representative
Years	Team	Pld	T	G	FG	P
19??–75	Auckland
1975	New Zealand	0	0	0	0	0
1976–??	Canterbury

Murray Wright is a New Zealand rugby league player who represented New Zealand in the 1975 World Cup.

== Playing career ==
Wright played for Otahuhu and played for Auckland. He was selected for the New Zealand national rugby league team squad for the 1975 World Cup, but did not play a match at the tournament.

Wright also had a brief spell in English club rugby league, making several appearances for Bramley during the 1974–75 season.

In 1976 Wright moved to Christchurch, joining the Hornby club and representing Canterbury. The New Zealand Rugby League imposed a $1000 transfer fee.
