= Steve Hage =

Australian rugby league footballer

Personal information
- Full name: Steven John Hage
- Born: 3 February 1954 (age 72) Rockhampton, Queensland, Australia

Playing information
- Height: 1.79 m (5 ft 10 in)
- Weight: 84 kg (185 lb)
- Position: Second-row, Prop
Club
Years	Team	Pld	T	G	FG	P
1976–78	Canterbury-Bankstown	36	3	10	0	29
1979	Newtown Jets	9	0	0	0	0
1980	Eastern Suburbs	1	0	0	0	0
	Total	46	3	10	0	29
Representative
Years	Team	Pld	T	G	FG	P
1978	New South Wales	2	0	0	0	0

Steve Hage (born 3 February 1954 in Rockhampton, Queensland, Australia) is an Australian former professional rugby league footballer.

== Playing career ==
A talented attacking forward from the Gold Coast was spotted by the then Canterbury committeeman Barry Nelson who signed him to the Canterbury-Bankstown in 1976. Hage joined the Newtown Jets for one year in 1979, and then joined the Eastern Suburbs club in 1980. Hage also represented N.S.W. in 1978.
