= Norm Henderson (rugby league) =

Australian rugby league footballer (1944–1975)

Personal information
- Full name: Norman Alan Henderson
- Born: 1944
- Died: 22 Aug 1975 (aged 30–31) Cessnock, New South Wales

Playing information
- Position: Hooker
Club
Years	Team	Pld	T	G	FG	P
1964–67	Balmain	20	1	0	0	3
1968–71	St. George	42	6	0	0	18
	Total	62	7	0	0	21
Representative
Years	Team	Pld	T	G	FG	P
1973	NSW Country	1	0	0	0	0
- Source: Whiticker/Hudson

Norm Henderson is an Australian former rugby league footballer who played in the 1960s and 1970s.

== Career ==
Norm Henderson career began at Balmain in 1964. He played four seasons with the Tigers moving to the St. George in 1968, to take over the vacant Hooking position after the retirement of Ian Walsh the previous year.

Henderson played on at St George for four seasons between 1968 - 1971. He then went on to captain the Cessnock Goannas rugby league club, where he gained legendary status when he captained/coached the club to the Newcastle Premiership in 1972.

== Death ==
Henderson died at Cessnock Hospital on 22 Aug 1975, 3 months after a major brain operation.

== Accolades ==
The Cessnock Goannas named Norm Henderson in their "Team of the Century" in 2011, and the club's 'Player of the Year' award is also named in Norm Henderson's honour.
