= Bill Johnsen =

New Zealand international rugby league footballer

Personal information
- Born: 19 June 1946 (age 80) Dunollie, New Zealand

Playing information
- Position: Centre
Club
Years	Team	Pld	T	G	FG	P
	Runanga
Representative
Years	Team	Pld	T	G	FG	P
	West Coast
1969	South Island
1974	New Zealand	3	0	0	0	0

Bill Johnsen is a New Zealand former rugby league footballer who represented New Zealand.

== Playing career ==
Johnsen played for the West Coast and represented the South Island in 1969.

In 1974 he played for the New Zealand national rugby league team, playing in a three match series against Great Britain. That year he also won the West Coast Rugby League's Player of the Year award.
