= Ian Dauth =

Australian rugby league player

Personal information
- Born: 10 February 1949 (age 77)

Playing information
- Position: Wing
Club
Years	Team	Pld	T	G	FG	P
	Past Brothers (Brisbane)
Representative
Years	Team	Pld	T	G	FG	P
1978–79	Queensland	6	0	13	0	26

Ian Dauth (born 10 February 1949) is an Australian former professional rugby league footballer. A renowned goal-kicker, Dauth played 6 representative games for Queensland.

== Playing career ==
Dauth played for Past Brothers in the Brisbane rugby league premiership. He was signed by the team in 1970 at the age of 21, before gaining a spot in the first grade side soon after. Dauth was a member of the Brothers team who lost 9–2 in the 1974 grand final to the Fortitude Valley Diehards. After playing for Brothers, he played for Nerang in the Gold Coast rugby league competition, gaining selection for the Queensland representative team. He played his first representative game in May, 1978 in a 19–25 loss to New South Wales in the Inter State Series.

Dauth concluded his representative rugby league career with 13 goals (26 points) in 6 appearances.

== Personal life ==
Dauth was from Beaudesert and worked as a mechanic. Dauth has resided in Maleny since 1982. He was president of the Maleny rugby league club which played in a second division competition and is a long-serving committeeman of the Sunshine Coast Men of League branch.
