= Les Beehre =

New Zealand international rugby league footballer

Personal information
- Full name: Leslie John Beehre
- Born: 1 February 1952 (age 74) Auckland, New Zealand

Playing information
- Position: Hooker
Club
| Years | Team | Pld | T | G | FG | P |
|---|---|---|---|---|---|---|
| | Mt Wellington (ARL) |
Representative
| Years | Team | Pld | T | G | FG | P |
| 1981 | Auckland | 1 | 0 | 0 | 0 | 0 |
| 1975 | New Zealand | 0 | 0 | 0 | 0 | 0 |

Les Beehre is a New Zealand former rugby league footballer who represented New Zealand in the 1975 World Cup.

== Playing career ==
Beehre played in the Auckland Rugby League competition and represented Auckland. In 1975 he was selected in the New Zealand national rugby league team for the 1975 World Cup, however did not play in a test match at the tournament. In 1981 Beehre played in the Auckland side that defeated the touring French side 20-10 at Carlaw Park.
