= Kevin Barry (rugby league) =

New Zealand international rugby league footballer

Personal information
- Full name: Kevin Anthony Barry
- Born: 15 May 1950 New Zealand
- Died: 21 May 2012 (aged 62) Beenleigh, Queensland, Australia

Playing information
- Position: Scrum-half
Club
Years	Team	Pld	T	G	FG	P
	Mt Roskill
Representative
Years	Team	Pld	T	G	FG	P
1973–1975	Auckland
1975	New Zealand	0	0	0	0	0

Kevin Anthony Barry (15 May 1950 – 21 May 2012) was a New Zealand rugby league footballer who represented New Zealand in the 1975 World Cup.

== Playing career ==
Barry played for the Mt Roskill Red Devils in the Auckland Rugby League competition before being named for Auckland in 1973.

He was named in the New Zealand national rugby league team squad at the 1975 World Cup but did not play in a match at the tournament. Before he represented the Kiwis, Barry was the vice captain of the New Zealand Universities side, which played the Australian Universities in three Tests at home in 1971.

Barry died on 21 May 2012 in Beenleigh, Queensland, Australia.
