= Barrie Dyer =

New Zealand international rugby league footballer

Personal information
- Full name: Barrie Edward Dyer
- Born: 28 August 1952 (age 73) Auckland, New Zealand

Playing information
- Position: Second-row
Club
Years	Team	Pld	T	G	FG	P
	Mount Wellington
Representative
Years	Team	Pld	T	G	FG	P
1974–75	Auckland
1975	New Zealand	0	0	0	0	0

Barrie Dyer is a New Zealand rugby league player who represented New Zealand in the 1975 World Cup.

== Playing career ==
Dyer played in the Auckland Rugby League competition. In 1974 he played for Auckland when they defeated Great Britain 11-2. In 1975 he was part of Auckland sides who defeated France 9-3 and lost to Australia 6-17.

He was selected for the New Zealand national rugby league team squad for the 1975 World Cup but did not play a match at the tournament.
