= Josh Liavaʻa =

NZ international rugby league footballer

Personal information
- Full name: Tuʻiono Siosiua Liavaʻa
- Born: 10 May 1948 Tonga
- Died: 13 July 2014 (aged 66) Kahaluu, Hawaii, United States of America

Playing information
- Position: Second-row
Club
Years	Team	Pld	T	G	FG	P
	Northcote Tigers
Representative
Years	Team	Pld	T	G	FG	P
	Auckland
1975	New Zealand	0	0	0	0	0
1977	New Zealand Māori

Tuʻiono Siosiua "Josh" Liavaʻa (10 May 1948 – 13 July 2014) was a Tongan-born rugby league player who represented New Zealand in the 1975 World Cup, known for his relationships with Tongan royal family members.

== Playing career ==
A Northcote Tigers player in the Auckland Rugby League competition, Liavaʻa played for Auckland and in 1975 was picked in the New Zealand national rugby league team for the 1975 World Cup.

In 1977 Liavaʻa played for New Zealand Māori in the Pacific Cup.

== Personal life ==
Liavaʻa was a member of the New Zealand Police. He was a detective and later a uniform branch sergeant. He completed a Diploma in Criminology at Auckland University. During the early 1980s, he and fellow police officer; inspector Ross Meurant, established a private security company they registered in their wives'names, to avoid being "Court Martialed" for conflicts of interest. Maiden Security operated for 5 years until Meurant entered parliament as an MP in 1987.

After leaving the police, Liavaʻa ran a nightclub in Sydney.

Liavaʻa was married several times, including to:

- Princess Siuilikutapu of Tonga, a niece of Tongan monarch Tāufaʻāhau Tupou IV; they married in November 1969. The king was reportedly furious and lured the princess back to Tonga, where she was kept under palace arrest. The marriage was annulled by royal decree.
- Levaai Nancy Wolfgramm, a cousin of the Olympic silver medallist boxer Paea Wolfgramm. The couple married in 1971.

In the 1980s Liavaʻa reportedly had an affair with Tāufaʻāhau Tupou IV's only daughter, Princess Pilolevu Tuita.

He died from a gunshot in Hawaii on 13 July 2014.
