= John Hibbs (rugby league) =

New Zealand international rugby league footballer

Personal information
- Full name: John Douglas Hibbs
- Born: 3 August 1944 (age 82) West Coast Region, New Zealand

Playing information
- Position: Second-row
Representative
Years	Team	Pld	T	G	FG	P
	West Coast
	South Island
1969–75	New Zealand	6	0	0	0	0

John Hibbs is a New Zealand former professional rugby league footballer who played in the 1960s and 1970s, he represented New Zealand in the 1975 World Cup.

== Playing career ==
Hibbs played in Greymouth, representing both the West Coast and the South Island. He was first selected for the New Zealand national rugby league team in 1969, playing against Australia. In 1974 he won the New Zealand Rugby League player of the year award.

His last match for New Zealand was against France in 1975 at the World Championship.
