= Bob Jarvis (rugby league) =

New Zealand international rugby league footballer

Personal information
- Full name: Robert John Jarvis
- Born: 3 September 1950 (age 74); Auckland, New Zealand

Playing information
- Position: Stand-off
Club
Years	Team	Pld	T	G	FG	P
1967–75	Otahuhu
1976–76	Hornby
1977–79	Addington (Player/Coach)
1992–92	Lincoln University
	Total	0	0	0	0	0
Representative
Years	Team	Pld	T	G	FG	P
1973–75	Auckland
1973	New Zealand Colt (Australia tour)
1974–75	New Zealand	9	3	0	0	9
1976–79	Canterbury
1976–76	New Zealand Thirteen	1	1			3

Bob Jarvis is a New Zealand rugby league footballer who represented New Zealand in the 1975 World Cup.

== Playing career ==
Jarvis played for the Otahuhu Leopards in the Auckland Rugby League competition. In 1973 he played for Auckland. In 1974 he was part of the Auckland side that defeated Great Britain and also won the Auckland Rugby League's Bert Humphries Memorial trophy as most improved back.

That year he made his New Zealand national rugby league team' debut, playing against Great Britain. In 1975 he was part of the Auckland side that defeated Wales and also played for New Zealand in the World Championship.

In 1976 Jarvis was one of three Aucklanders who signed with Hornby, for which the New Zealand Rugby League imposed a $1000 transfer fee per player. He represented Canterbury that year and did so until 1979.
