= Doug Gailey =

New Zealand international rugby league footballer & coach

Personal information
- Full name: Douglas James Gailey
- Born: 4 November 1947 New Zealand
- Died: 6 February 2007 (aged 59) Auckland, New Zealand

Playing information
- Position: Prop
Club
Years	Team	Pld	T	G	FG	P
	Ellerslie
1973–79	Manukau
1975	Wentworthville
	Total	0	0	0	0	0
Representative
Years	Team	Pld	T	G	FG	P
1968–80	Auckland
1969–74	New Zealand	19	0	0	0	0

Coaching information
Club
Years	Team	Gms	W	D	L	W%
1973–8?	Manukau

Doug Gailey (died 6 February 2007) was a New Zealand former rugby league footballer who represented New Zealand in the 1970 and 1972 World Cups.

== Boxing career ==
Gailey boxed as a middleweight and won the Auckland Intermediate Middleweight title in the 1960s. He was a member of the Auckland Boxing Association until 1991.

== Playing career ==
Originally from the Ellerslie Eagles club, Gailey made his international debut for the New Zealand national rugby league team in 1969 against Australia. He played in both the 1970 and 1972 World Cups and again represented New Zealand in 1974. In 1973 he moved to the Manukau club, accepting a position as player-coach. In 1975 he travelled to Sydney, trialling for the Balmain Tigers before playing the season with the Wentworthville Magpies in the Sydney Metropolitan Cup.

Gailey returned to Manukau as player-coach for the 1976 season and in 1979 led them to a Roope Rooster victory. He was also recalled to the Auckland side that year. In 1978 he was captain-coach of the Wanderers RLFC in the Bundaberg competition in Queensland.

A noted toughman, Gailey had laid out Jimmy Thompson during his last test series against the Great Britain Lions in 1974. When he played the Lions five years later for Auckland, Gailey had a target on his back. This resulted in an all in brawl sparked by Gailey and Mel James.

== Personal life ==
Gailey was a bricklayer by trade.
