= Tom Conroy (rugby league) =

New Zealand international rugby league footballer

Personal information
- Full name: Thomas Harley Conroy
- Born: 20 June 1951 (age 73); New Zealand

Playing information
- Position: Hooker
Club
Years	Team	Pld	T	G	FG	P
	Ponsonby
Representative
Years	Team	Pld	T	G	FG	P
	Auckland
1975	New Zealand	8	1	0	0	3

Tom Conroy is a New Zealand rugby league footballer who represented New Zealand in the 1975 World Cup.

== Playing career ==
Conroy played for the Ponsonby Ponies in the Auckland Rugby League competition. He won the Lipscombe Cup as sportsman of the year in 1973. He represented Auckland, including against the touring Great Britain Lions in 1974 and against France in 1981.

Conroy played in eight tests for the New Zealand national rugby league team during the 1975 World Cup.
