= John Greengrass =

New Zealand international rugby league footballer

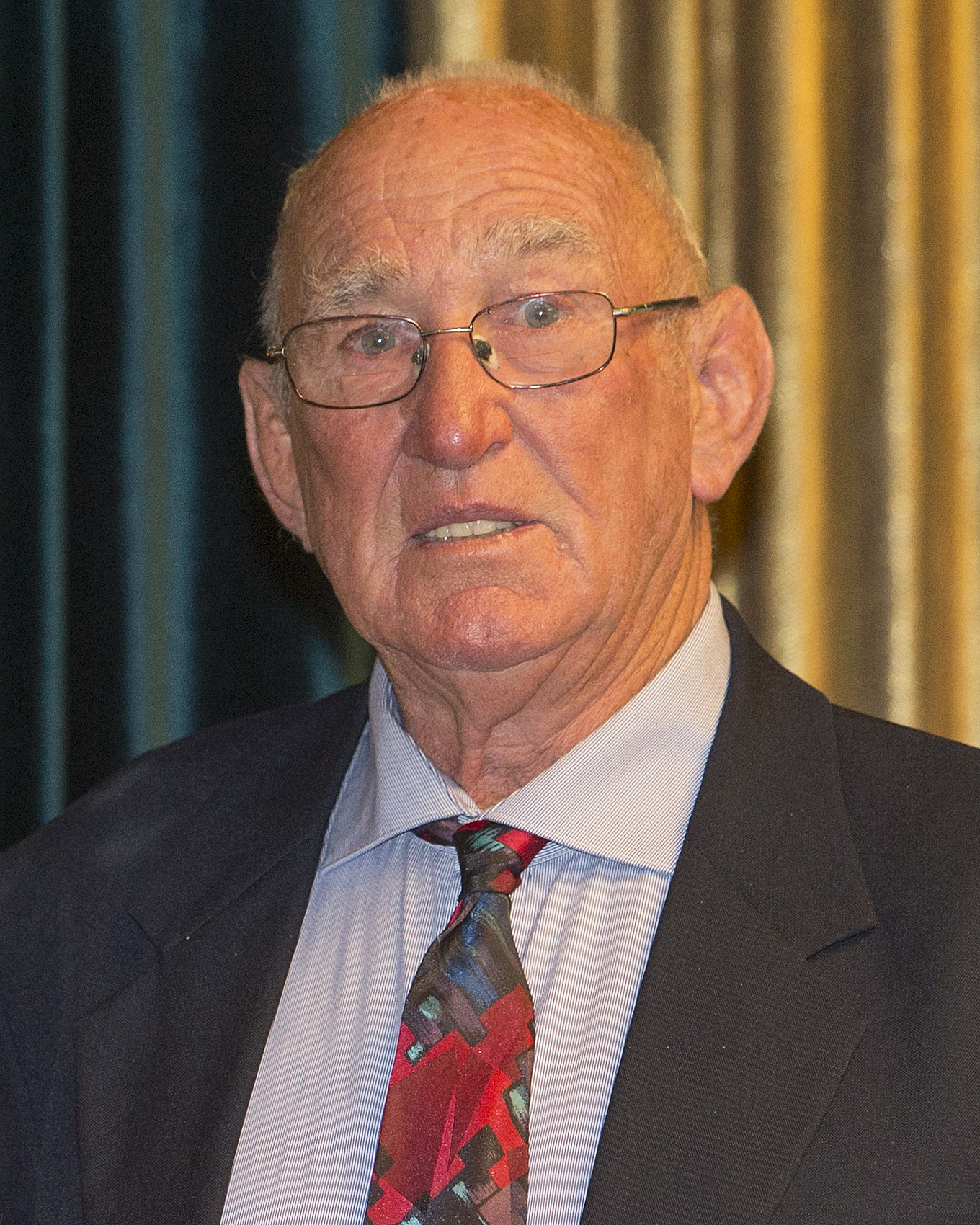
- Greengrass in 2022

Personal information
- Born: 10 August 1947 (age 79) Greymouth, New Zealand

Playing information
- Position: Prop, Second-row
Club
Years	Team	Pld	T	G	FG	P
19??–75	Linwood
1976–??	Kaiapoi
	Total	0	0	0	0	0
Representative
Years	Team	Pld	T	G	FG	P
1970–77	Canterbury	38	10	0	0	30
1970–75	New Zealand	18	2	0	0	6

John Greengrass is a New Zealand former rugby league footballer who represented New Zealand in the 1970 and 1975 World Cups.

== Playing career ==
A Linwood Keas player, a Canterbury representative Greengrass made his debut for the New Zealand national rugby league team in 1970 at the World Cup. Greengrass also represented Southern Zone in matches against Northern Zone. He played in 35 games for New Zealand, scoring six tries. This included 18 test matches for New Zealand. He was also part of New Zealand's squad at the 1970 and 1975 World Cups and toured Great Britain and France in 1971 and Australia in 1972. He was unavailable for both the 1972 World Cup and the 1975 Australia tour.

His international career was ended in a World Cup match against Wales. Greengrass had just scored a try when Jim Mills stomped on his head. Greengrass went to hospital and received 15 stitches. Mills was suspended for six months by the Rugby Football League and banned for life from playing in New Zealand by the New Zealand Rugby League.

In 1976 Greengrass moved from Linwood and joined the Kaiapoi club.

== Personal life ==
Greengrass became engaged to Christine Joy Ellis in February 1972, and the couple married in Ashburton later that year. Chris Greengrass became active as a community leader in the Kaiapoi area. From 1974 to 1984 she was involved with the local Plunket Society, serving in roles including chair, secretary and treasurer. Following the 2011 Christchurch earthquake, she was a Waimakariri Earthquake Trust team leader, supporting local families. She was elected to the Kaiapoi-Tuahiwi Community Board, serving as chair from the 2019 election until she stepped down due to ill-health. She died in Christchurch on 15 May 2022, having been awarded the Queen's Service Medal for services to the community the previous day as part of the 2022 Queen's Birthday and Platinum Jubilee Honours.
