= Rodney Walker (New Zealand) =

New Zealand rugby league footballer (born 1949)

Personal information
- Full name: Rodney Stephen Walker
- Born: 5 July 1949 (age 77) Christchurch, New Zealand

Playing information
- Position: Loose forward
Club
Years	Team	Pld	T	G	FG	P
	Papanui
Representative
Years	Team	Pld	T	G	FG	P
1968–77	Canterbury	50
1969–73	Southern Zone
1969–72	New Zealand	6	0	0	0	0
1974	South Island

Coaching information
Club
Years	Team	Gms	W	D	L	W%
1975–76	Papanui

Rodney Walker (born 5 July 1949) is a New Zealand former professional rugby league footballer who represented New Zealand in the 1972 World Cup.

== Playing career ==
Walker played for the Papanui club in the Canterbury Rugby League competition. He was a Schoolboy Kiwi in 1964 and captained the New Zealand Colts in 1969 on a tour of New South Wales.

He represented Canterbury and Southern Zone. He played in 50 provincial games for Canterbury between 1968 and 1977, including 44 consecutive appearances. He was the first Canterbury player to reach the 50 mark and captained Canterbury in 1970.

Walker was selected for the New Zealand national rugby league team in 1969 and played in six test matches between 1969 and 1972, including at the 1972 World Cup.

In 1974 Walker played for the South Island against the touring Great Britain Lions.

As player-coach, Walker led Papanui to the 1975 and 1976 Canterbury championships.
