= Lyndsay Proctor =

New Zealand international rugby league footballer

Personal information
- Full name: Lyndsay John Proctor
- Born: 13 June 1952 New Zealand

Playing information
- Position: Prop
Club
Years	Team	Pld	T	G	FG	P
1977–78	New Hunslet	22	0	0	0	0
Representative
Years	Team	Pld	T	G	FG	P
1974–81	Auckland	10	1	0	0	3
1974–78	New Zealand	13	1	0	0	3
1975–81	New Zealand Māori	2	0	0	0	0

Lyndsay John Proctor is a New Zealand former professional rugby league footballer who represented New Zealand in the 1975 and 1977 World Cups.

== Playing career ==
Proctor played for the Ellerslie Eagles in the Auckland Rugby League competition and also represented Auckland. He won the Bert Humphries Memorial as most improved forward in the ARL competition in both 1973 and 1977.

He played in England for New Hunslet in the 1977–78 season.

He was first selected for the New Zealand national rugby league team in 1974 and went on to play in both the 1975 and 1977 World Cups. Proctor finished his Kiwis career in 1978 having played in thirteen test matches for New Zealand.
