= Warren Collicoat =

NZ international rugby league footballer and coach

Personal information
- Full name: Warren Rea Collicoat
- Born: 9 December 1950 (age 75)

Playing information
- Position: Fullback
Club
Years	Team	Pld	T	G	FG	P
	Mount Albert
1976–77	Porirua City
1978–79	Upper Hutt Tigers
	Total	0	0	0	0	0
Representative
Years	Team	Pld	T	G	FG	P
	Auckland
1972–79	New Zealand	16	0	34	0	68
1976–79	Wellington	24				190
1979	Central Districts	3

Coaching information
Club
Years	Team	Gms	W	D	L	W%
1976–77	Porirua City

Warren Rea Collicoat is a New Zealand former professional rugby league footballer who represented New Zealand at three World Cups.

== Playing career ==
Collicoat, an Auckland representative, first represented the New Zealand national rugby league team in 1972. He went on to be selected in three World Cup squads; 1972, 1975 and 1977. A goalkicking fullback, Collicoat finished his international career with 70 points from 35 goals in sixteen test matches.

In 1977 he moved south, joining Porirua City as a player-coach in 1976. He led the team to the Wellington Rugby League grand final in his first year, however they lost to Randwick. That year he had scored 177 points in only 23 games for Porirua. He spent two seasons at Porirua before moving to the Upper Hutt Tigers where he won a premiership in 1979. In four seasons in the Wellington competition he scored 869 points. He also played in twenty four matches for Wellington, scoring 190 points, and in three games for Central Districts.

== Legacy ==
In 2012 he was named in the Wellington Rugby League's Team of the Century.
