= Peter Gurnick =

New Zealand rugby league footballer (born 1949)

Personal information
- Full name: William Peter Gurnick
- Born: 15 November 1949 (age 76) New Zealand

Playing information
- Position: Loose forward
Club
Years	Team	Pld	T	G	FG	P
	Otahuhu Leopards
Representative
Years	Team	Pld	T	G	FG	P
	Auckland
1972–75	New Zealand	7	0	0	0	0

William Peter Gurnick is a New Zealand former professional rugby league footballer who represented New Zealand in the 1972 and 1975 World Cups.

== Playing career ==
Gurnick won the Bert Humphries Memorial medal while playing for the Otahuhu Leopards in 1972 as the most improved forward in the Auckland Rugby League competition. He was selected for the New Zealand national rugby league team that year, making his debut against France in that year's World Cup. He missed out on New Zealand selection in 1973, but did represent Auckland. He was again picked for New Zealand in 1974 and in 1975 was included in the 1975 World Cup squad.
