= John O'Sullivan (rugby league) =

New Zealand international rugby league footballer and coach (1950–2018)

Personal information
- Full name: John Charles O'Sullivan
- Born: 11 August 1950 New Zealand
- Died: 7 September 2018 (aged 68)

Playing information
- Position: Centre
Club
Years	Team	Pld	T	G	FG	P
	Northcote Tigers
	Ponsonby Ponies
	Unknown (WRL)
	Total	0	0	0	0	0
Representative
Years	Team	Pld	T	G	FG	P
197?–75	Auckland
1971–75	New Zealand	10	0	0	0	0
1976–7?	Wellington

Coaching information
Club
Years	Team	Gms	W	D	L	W%
	Northcote Tigers

John Charles O'Sullivan (11 August 1950 – 7 September 2018) was a New Zealand rugby league footballer who played in the team that represented New Zealand in the 1972 and 1975 World Cups.

== Early years ==
O'Sullivan attended Rosmini College.

== Playing career ==
O'Sullivan played for the Northcote Tigers in the Auckland Rugby League competition and also played in the Auckland rugby league team representing Auckland.

By 1971 he had moved to the Ponsonby club.

He was first selected for the New Zealand national rugby league team in 1971, but did not make his debut until the second test match against the Australian team in 1972. He was part of the squad at the 1972 World Cup.

In 1974, O'Sullivan was part of the Auckland side that defeated Great Britain's side 11–2 at Carlaw Park. He also played in the three match test series against Great Britain for the Kiwis.

In 1975 O'Sullivan played for Auckland in their victory over Wales and again played for the Kiwis in the 1975 World Championship. The World Championship match against Wales was the last of his ten test matches for New Zealand.

He moved to Wellington in 1976 and became a Wellington representative, playing for the Wellington rugby league team before retiring.

== Coaching career ==
In 1984 he coached a Kiwi's trial team. He coached the Northcote Tigers in the 1986 Auckland Rugby League competition.

He Also coached Wellington

== Retirement and death ==
O'Sullivan lived in Rangiora, near Christchurch, in the latter years of his life, and died on 7 September 2018 aged 68.
