= 1977 Rugby League World Cup squads =

The 1977 Rugby League World Cup involved players from the national rugby league football teams of four countries: Australia, France, Great Britain and New Zealand.

== Australia ==
Coach: (Australia) Terry Fearnley

1. Graham Eadie
2. Allan McMahon
3. Mick Cronin
4. Russel Gartner
5. Mark Harris
6. Mark Thomas
7. Terry Fahey
8. John Peard
9. John Kolc
10. Greg Veivers
11. Nick Geiger
12. Terry Randall
13. Arthur Beetson (C)
14. Ray Higgs
15. Greg Pierce
16. Rod Reddy
17. Denis Fitzgerald
18. Tom Raudonikis

== France ==
Coach: (France) Yves Bégou

1. Guy Alard (Carcassonne)
2. Christian Baile (Carcassonne)
3. Hervé Bonet (Saint-Estève)
4. Jean-Marc Bourret (XIII Catalan)
5. Jean-Louis Brial (XIII Catalan)
6. José Calle (Saint-Estève) (C)
7. Manuel Caravaca (Carcassonne)
8. Michel Cassin (Toulouse)
9. Max Chantal (Villeneuve)
10. Patrick Chauvet (Carcassonne)
11. Jean-Jacques Cologni (XIII Catalan)
12. Henri Daniel (XIII Catalan)
13. Guy Garcia (Carcassonne)
14. Jacques Guigue (Avignon)
15. Christian Laskawiec (Albi)
16. Gérard Lépine (Bordeaux)
17. Jackie Imbert (Avignon)
18. Jean-Marie Imbert (Avignon)
19. Jean-Claude Mayorgas (Toulouse)
20. Michel Moussard (Albi)
21. José Moya (Carcassonne)
22. Guy Rodriguez (Toulouse)
23. Joël Roosebrouck (Villeneuve)
24. André Ruiz (Carcassonne)
25. Pierre Saboureau (XIII Catalan)
26. Jean-Paul Sauret (XIII Catalan)
27. René Terrats (Saint-Estève)

== Great Britain ==
The initial squad was selected in April 1977, but several changes were made before the team's departure. Phil Lowe and Jim Mills both pulled out of the tournament due to bans imposed by the Australian Rugby League and New Zealand Rugby League respectively. Eddie Cunningham withdrew for domestic reasons, while Tommy Martyn withdrew due to injury.

Coach: (United Kingdom) David Watkins; Manager: (United Kingdom) Reg Parker

1. Roger Millward (c)
2. Eddie Bowman
3. Len Casey
4. Les Dyl
5. Keith Elwell
6. George Fairbairn
7. Keith Fielding
8. Bill Francis
9. Ken Gill
10. Alan Hodkinson
11. Phil Hogan
12. John Holmes
13. Sammy Lloyd
14. Steve Nash
15. George Nicholls
16. Steve Pitchford
17. Peter Smith
18. Jimmy Thompson
19. David Ward
20. Stuart Wright

== New Zealand ==
Coach: (New Zealand) Ron Ackland

Player	Position	Age	Club	Games	Points
Tony Coll (c)	Second-row	27	West Coast	3	0
Fred Ah Kuoi	Centre	20	Auckland	2	0
Ray Baxendale	Prop	22	West Coast	2	0
Warren Collicoat	Fullback	26	Wellington	2	12
Olsen Filipaina	Centre	20	Auckland	3	0
Kevin Fisher	Wing	23	Waikato	3	6
Mark Graham	Loose forward	21	Auckland	2	3
Whare Henry	Loose forward	22	Wellington	2	0
Whetu Henry	Prop	26	Wellington	3	0
Chris Jordan	Fullback	24	Auckland	2	19
Michael O'Donnell	Fullback	25	Canterbury	1	0
Dane O'Hara	Wing	23	Auckland	1	0
Lyndsay Proctor	Prop	25	Auckland	2	0
Alan Rushton	Second-row	27	Canterbury	3	3
John Smith	Centre	22	Auckland	3	6
Dane Sorensen	Prop	21	Cronulla-Sutherland	1	0
Kurt Sorensen	Second-row	20	Wigan	3	0
John Whittaker	Fullback	26	Wellington	3	3
Dennis Williams	Five-eighth	23	Auckland	3	0
