= 1977 Rugby League World Cup final =

Australia	Great Britain (United Kingdom)
(ARL)	(RFL)
13	12
	1	2	Total
AUS	10	3	13
GBR	7	5	12
- Date: 25 June 1977
- Stadium: Sydney Cricket Ground
- Location: Sydney, Australia
- Referee: Billy Thompson (Great Britain)
- Attendance: 24,457

Broadcast partners
- Broadcasters: ABC (Australia) Nine Network (Australia) BBC (United Kingdom)
- Commentators: Alan Marks (ABC); Norman May (ABC); Ron Casey (Nine); Bob Fulton (Nine); Eddie Waring (BBC)

The 1977 Rugby League World Cup final was the conclusive game of the 1977 Rugby League World Cup tournament and was played between Australia and Great Britain on 25 June 1977 at the Sydney Cricket Ground in Australia.

== Background ==
The 1977 Rugby League World Cup was the eighth staging of the Rugby League World Cup since its inauguration in 1954, and the first since the 1972 tournament. The tournament was held in the Australia and New Zealand from 29 May, culminating in the final between Australia and Great Britain on 25 June.

=== Australia ===
Scores and results list Australia's points tally first.

Opposing Team	For	Against	Date	Venue	Attendance	Stage
New Zealand	22	2	29 May	Carlaw Park, Auckland	18,000	Group stage
France	21	9	11 June	Sydney Cricket Ground, Sydney	13,231	Group stage
Great Britain	19	5	18 June	Lang Park, Brisbane	27,000	Group stage

Australia were undefeated going into the final.

=== Great Britain ===
Scores and results list Great Britain's points tally first.

Opposing Team	For	Against	Date	Venue	Attendance	Stage
France	23	4	5 June	Carlaw Park, Auckland	10,000	Group stage
New Zealand	30	12	12 June	Addington Showground, Christchurch	9,000	Group stage
Australia	5	19	18 June	Lang Park, Brisbane	27,000	Group stage

== Match details ==
Although this was an international match, the Kangaroos player numbers were as used in Australia at the time with the forwards numbers being reversed (e.g. the front rowers wore numbers 11 and 13 rather than 8 and 10). Great Britain played in the standard international numbers.

25 June 1977

Australia	13–12	Great Britain
Tries: Allan McMahon; Russel Gartner; John Kolc; Goals: Michael Cronin (2/4)		Tries: Steve Pitchford; Ken Gill Goals: George Fairbairn (3/4)

Sydney Cricket Ground, Sydney
Attendance: 24,457
Referee: Billy Thompson (England)
Player of the Match: Greg Pierce

Australia	Great Britain

FB	1	Graham Eadie
RW	2	Allan McMahon
RC	3	Michael Cronin
LC	4	Russel Gartner
LW	5	Mark Harris
FE	6	John Peard
HB	7	John Kolc
LK	8	Greg Pierce
SR	9	Ray Higgs
SR	10	Arthur Beetson (c)
PR	11	Terry Randall
HK	12	Nick Geiger
PR	13	Greg Veivers
Substitutions:
IC	14	Denis Fitzgerald
IC	15	Mark Thomas
Coach:
(Australia) Terry Fearnley

FB	1	George Fairbairn
RW	2	Stuart Wright
RC	3	John Holmes
LC	4	Les Dyl
LW	5	Bill Francis
SO	6	Roger Millward (c)
SH	7	Steve Nash
LF	8	Phil Hogan
SR	9	Eddie Bowman
SR	10	Len Casey
PR	11	Jimmy Thompson
HK	12	Keith Elwell
PR	13	Steve Pitchford
Substitutions:
IC	14	Ken Gill
IC	15	Peter Smith
Coach:
(Wales) David Watkins

After their 19–5 win over Great Britain a week earlier at Lang Park in Brisbane (which actually drew 2,543 more fans than the Final), the Australians went into the Final as warm favourites. However, led by experienced captain Roger Millward, the Lions managed to dominate possession throughout the game, and it took a last minute try from Australian halfback John Kolc (playing his only international game for Australia) to secure the Cup in front of 24,457 spectators at the Sydney Cricket Ground.

=== First half ===
The Australian's opened the scoring through Allan McMahon who scored in the Paddington corner. Michael Cronin kicked the sideline conversion and Australia led 5–0. Great Britain soon his back with a try to Steve Pitchford. George Fairbairn converted the try to lock the scores at 5–5. The match was then highlighted by a 60-metre try to Australian centre Russel Gartner who pounced on a dropped ball from Lions fullback Fairbairn after a Great Britain scrum win to race away and score in the 18th minute. Only converging defence from Gartner's opposite number Les Dyl kept him from scoring closer to the posts, giving Cronin a difficult conversion from midway between the posts and the touch line. Cronin missed the attempt and the Australian's led 8–5. Fairbairn then kicked a penalty goal to make the scores 8–7 closing in on half time.

Late in the first half the gritty and determined Lions were considered unlucky not to score when they were denied what would have been a certain try to winger Stuart Wright by English referee Billy Thompson. Wright had intercepted a pass from Cronin to Mark Harris 15 metres from the Australian line and was racing downfield with no one near him when Thompson called play back for an obstruction penalty to Great Britain rather than play advantage. Had Wright scored, and likely under the posts, it could have given the visitors a 12–8 lead going into the break. Instead, soon after Cronoin kicked a penalty goal from in front of the posts to make the score 10–7 going into half time.

=== Second half ===
Australia took the lead out to 13–7 after a try to John Kolc in the Randwick corner in front of the Bradman Stand. Fairbairn had dropped a downfield kick by Cronin and the ball was pounced upon by Allan McMahon. From acting half, Kolc then dummied which fooled Fairbairn and Bill Francis and he raced away to score in the corner. Cronin missed the difficult kick from the sideline and the score remained at 13–7.

The Lions then hit back with a try under the posts to replacement back Ken Gill which was converted by Fairbairn to bring the scores to 13–12. After Kolc was penalised for using an elbow on Roger Millward who was chasing his own chip-kick, Fairbairn then had a late chance to give Great Britain the lead with a penalty goal from 45 metres out, though his went just to the right of the posts into the waiting arms of Australian fullback Graham Eadie who took full advantage of the Lions defence line still being near halfway to run the ball back outside the Australian quarter line.

== See also ==
- Rugby League World Cup
- Australia national rugby league team
- Great Britain national rugby league team
- List of rugby league test matches at the Sydney Cricket Ground
