= Bob Doyle (rugby league) =

Australian rugby league footballer

Personal information
- Full name: Robert Doyle
- Born: 16 July 1944 (age 80); Sydney, New South Wales, Australia

Playing information
- Position: Five-eighth
Club
Years	Team	Pld	T	G	FG	P
1966–70	Canterbury-Bankstown	61	8	0	0	24
1971–72	North Sydney	8	1	0	0	3
	Total	69	9	0	0	27
- Source: As of 15 April 2019

Bob Doyle nicknamed "Yabba" is an Australian former rugby league footballer who played in the 1960s and 1970s. He played for Canterbury-Bankstown and North Sydney in the New South Wales Rugby League (NSWRL) competition.

== Background ==
Doyle played junior rugby league for Renown United in the St George district of Sydney before being graded by Canterbury.

== Playing career ==
Doyle made his first grade debut for Canterbury against South Sydney in 1966 after being called into the side to cover an injury within the team. Doyle later became the first choice five-eighth after Leo Toohey was demoted to reserve grade. Doyle then went on to partner Ross Kidd in the halves.

Doyle made 19 appearances for Canterbury in 1967 as the club reached the grand final after years of struggling on the field and had only finished as wooden spooners in 1964, 3 years prior. On their way to making the final, Canterbury defeated St George 12–11 at the Sydney Cricket Ground in the preliminary final ending St George's 11 year premiership reign.

Doyle played at five-eighth in the 1967 NSWRL grand final as Souths took an early lead. Canterbury then regained the lead to be ahead 8-5 until Canterbury hooker Col Brown tried a looping pass which was intended to find fullback Les Johns only for Souths player Bob McCarthy to intercept the ball and race away to score a try. Souths then went on to kick a late goal to win the match 12–10.

Doyle played with Canterbury up until the end of 1970 before departing for North Sydney. Doyle played 2 seasons with North Sydney as the club struggled towards the bottom of the ladder. Doyle retired at the end of 1972.
