= Clive Gartner =

Australian rugby league footballer

Personal information
- Full name: Clive Gartner
- Born: 15 May 1937 (age 88) Marrickville, New South Wales, Australia

Playing information
- Position: Wing, Five-eighth, Centre
Club
Years	Team	Pld	T	G	FG	P
1956–68	Canterbury-Bankstown	86	16	0	0	48
- Source: As of 15 April 2019
- Father: Joe Gartner
- Relatives: Daniel Gartner (son); Ray Gartner (brother); Russel Gartner (nephew); Renee Gartner (great niece)

Clive Gartner is an Australian former rugby league footballer who played in the 1950s and 1960s. He played for Canterbury-Bankstown in the New South Wales Rugby League (NSWRL) competition.

== Background ==
Gartner played his junior rugby league for Belmore before joining Canterbury in 1956.

== Playing career ==
Gartner initially played reserve grade for Canterbury occasionally being called up to the first grade side. Gartner played in the 1960 semi final loss against Eastern Suburbs. Gartner missed both the 1961 and 1962 seasons due to a shoulder injury. He returned to the first team in 1963 but missed the entire 1964 season due to a broken jaw. The 1964 season also finished for a wooden spoon as the club finished last.

Gartner made 21 appearances for Canterbury in 1967 as the club reached the grand final after years of struggling on the field. On their way to making the final, Canterbury defeated St George 12–11 at the Sydney Cricket Ground in the preliminary final ending St George's 11 year premiership reign.

Gartner played on the wing in the 1967 NSWRL grand final as Souths took an early lead. Canterbury then regained the lead to be ahead 8-5 until Canterbury hooker Col Brown tried a looping pass which was intended to find fullback Les Johns only for Souths player Bob McCarthy to intercept the ball and race away to score a try. Souths then went on to kick a late goal to win the match 12–10. Gartner played one final season for Canterbury in 1968 before retiring. In total, Gartner made 152 appearances for Canterbury across all grades.

== Post playing ==
Gartner went on to coach the lower grade sides at Canterbury including the Under 23 side. Gartner later became a life member of the club and was nominated for the Berries to Bulldogs 70 Year Team of Champions.
