= Norths Devils =

Australian rugby league club, based in Brisbane, QLD

Club information
- Full name: Norths Devils Rugby League Football Club
- Nickname(s): The Devils, Norths, Norty Norfs, The Devs
- Colours: Sky Blue, Navy Blue, Gold
- Founded: Past Grammar (1891; 135 years ago); Northern Suburbs District (1933; 93 years ago)
- Website: northsdevilsrlfc.com

Current details
- Ground: Albert Bishop Park, Nundah, Queensland
- CEO: Troy Rovelli
- Coach: Rohan Smith
- Captain: Kierran Moseley
- Competition: Queensland Cup; Brisbane Rugby League; Hastings Deering Colts; Mal Meninga Cup; Cyril Connell Challenge
- 2024: Premiers
- Current season

Records
- Premierships: 16 (1934, 1938, 1940, 1959, 1960, 1961, 1962, 1963, 1964, 1966, 1969, 1980, 1998, 2021, 2022, 2024)
- Runners-up: 11 (1931, 1932, 1939, 1941, 1944, 1945, 1967, 1970, 1990, 2010, 2025)
- Minor premierships: 13 (1935, 1939, 1940, 1945, 1959, 1961, 1962, 1963, 1966, 1969, 1974, 1998, 2021)
- Wooden spoons: 8 (1949, 1950, 1954, 1976, 1978, 1984, 1994, 2008)
- Premierships (3rd grade): 0
- Runners-up (3rd grade): 2 (2001, 2011)

The Northern Suburbs Devils, or North Brisbane Devils, or often simply referred to as Norths for short, are a rugby league club representing the northern suburbs of Brisbane, Australia. The team colours are sky blue, navy blue and gold. They play in the Hostplus Cup, and, through their predecessors, are one of the oldest clubs in Australia. Norths have won 16 A Grade, 17 Reserve Grade and 14 Colts/Third Grade Premierships. They hold the record for most consecutive first grade Brisbane Rugby League premierships, winning six in a row between 1959 and 1964 and being crowned champions most recently in 2024.

== History ==
=== Before rugby league ===
The first incarnation of Northern Suburbs was the Past Grammars Rugby Union club, which was formed in 1891 as a separate Old Boys football club for Brisbane Grammar School. It shouldn't be confused with the school team known as Past & Present Grammar (made up of students, teachers & past students) which competed from 1888 to 1890. The club was quite successful in its early years, winning premierships in 1892, 1898 and 1899, as well as 1914. Wallaby captain Bob McCowan was a Past Grammar player when he led the national side in 1899.

=== Switch to rugby league ===
Following the disbandment of club rugby union in Brisbane towards the end of the First World War, Past Grammars, along with Christian Brothers and University, joined the Rugby Football League in 1920

=== From Past Grammars RLFC to Norths ===
Past Grammars, also known as Grammar Norths, won their first premiership in 1927, before becoming Northern Suburbs, following the introduction of District Football by the Brisbane Rugby League in 1933.

=== Post-war ===
In 1959 Clive Churchill captain-coached Brisbane Rugby League club Norths to a premiership, his training methods were carried on by Bob Bax who coached Northern Suburbs RLFC to become the first club in BRL history to win three consecutive first grade premierships when they defeated Fortitude Valley 29–5 in the 1961 grand final in front of a then-record club crowd of 19,824 at Lang Park. Norths continued to dominate the decade with 7 grand final wins in 8 appearances. It would be another 11 years before they tasted success again.

Norths' Queensland representative player Nick Geiger was selected as the Australia national team's hooker in the final of the 1977 Rugby League World Cup tournament.

=== 1990s ===
Logo in use during 1980s and 1990s

In the 1990s, along with many other Queensland clubs, Norths suffered heavily financially. Eventually it came to the stage that in 1998 they became a feeder club with National Rugby League newcomers, the Melbourne Storm, which attracted much needed finance, as well as some quality players, as well as securing the Devils' future. Also in 1998, the club won its first First Grade premiership since 1980, beating Wests in the Grand Final.

=== 2000s ===
In the 2006 NRL Grand Final Melbourne's 17-man team had 13 players who had played with Norths in past years, including Matt Geyer, who won a Premiership with the Devils in 1998 and Melbourne in 1999. In the 2006 Tri-Nations series, 4 Norths players graduated to the Australian Kangaroos squad and 2 players, via Melbourne Storm, represented New Zealand Kiwis..

In 2008 the Devils signed a partnership agreement with the Brisbane Broncos which sees developing Broncos players train with and compete for the Devils in the Intrust Super Cup.

In 2018 Rohan Smith was recruited to be the Head Coach of the club. In 2019 he led the Devils to the finals, with the team falling agonizingly short of progressing past the first round.

In 2021, Norths won their first premiership since the 1998 season beating The Wynnum Manly Seagulls in the Grand Final as well as achieving the minor premiership. Such success was replicated the following season when Norths won the 2022 Queensland Cup with a 16-10 victory over club rivals Redcliffe marking The Devils first "back to back" premiership run in the Queensland Cup era. Norths also won the 2024 Cup, also in a final over Redcliffe. Under Coach Dave Elliott on 6 October 2024, Norths claimed their first NRL State Championship defeating the NSW Cup winners Newtown 20-18.

== Home grounds ==
For many years Norths played out of Oxenham Park in Nundah, but they moved to their current home ground, Albert Bishop Park, in 1969. Commonly referred to simply as 'Bishop Park', it borders the Schulz Canal in Nundah, and is named after club stalwart Albert Bishop, MBE. Norths has a licensed Leagues Club, Norths Leagues, at Bishop Park, as well as a second licensed Club at Anzac Avenue, Kallangur, further north of Brisbane.

== Season summaries ==
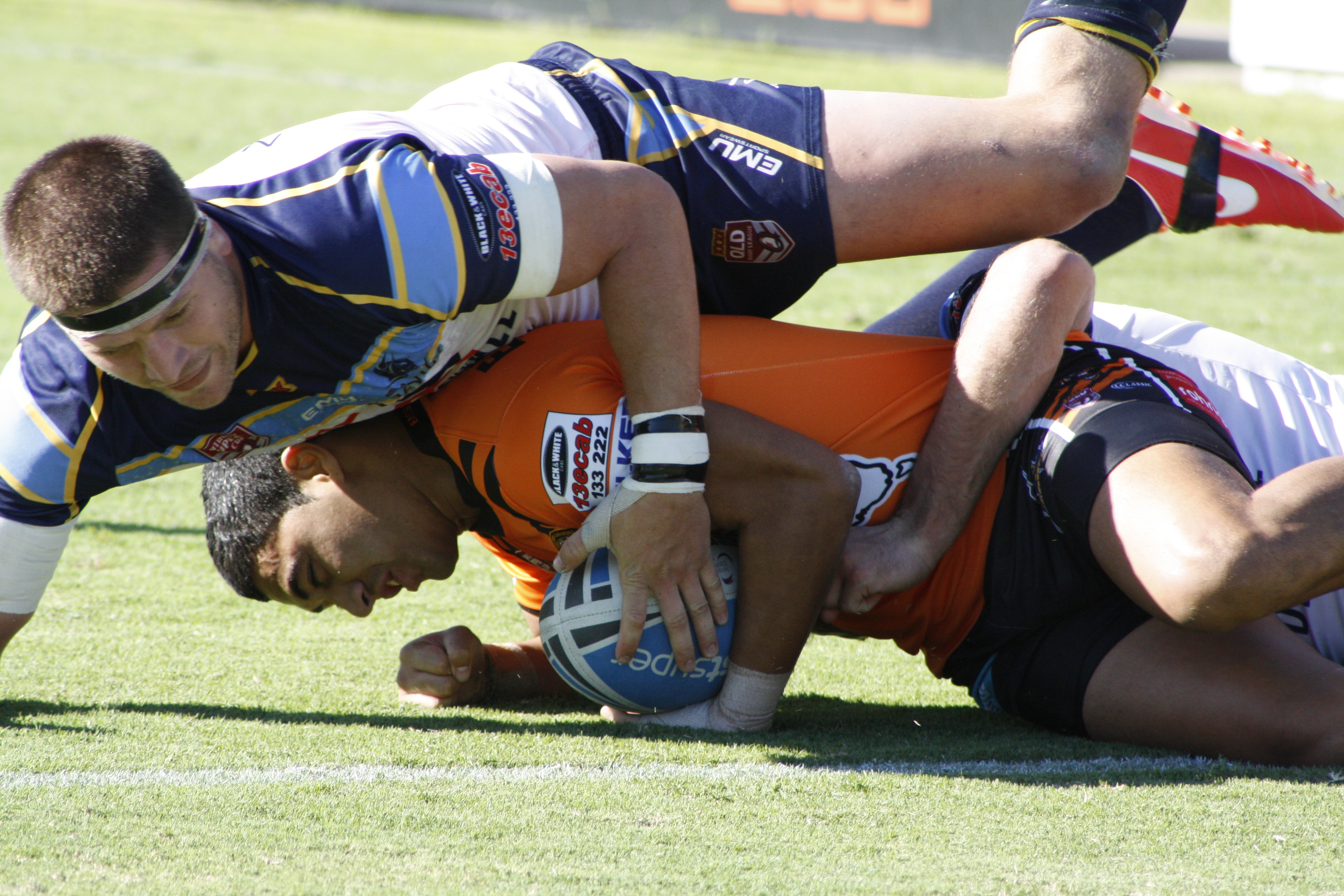
Easts Tigers versus Norths Devils at Langlands Park, Brisbane Australia. May 4, 2014.

=== BRL (1920–1995) ===
Season	Ladder position	Result
Past Grammar
1920	7th	did not qualify
1924	3rd	Semi-finalists
1925	6th	did not qualify
1926	5th	did not qualify
1927	2nd	Premiers
1928	6th	did not qualify
1929	5th	did not qualify
1930	4th	Semi-finalists
1931	3rd	Lost Grand Final Challenge
1932	2nd	Lost Grand Final Challenge
Northern Suburbs
1933	5th	did not qualify
1934	2nd	Premiers
1935	1st	Preliminary finalists
1936	3rd	Preliminary finalists
1937	4th	Semi-finalists
1938	2nd	Premiers
1939	1st	Runner-up
1940	1st	Premiers
1941	3rd	Runner-up
1942	4th	Semi-finalists
1943	4th	Preliminary finalists
1944	3rd	Runner-up
1945	1st	Runner-up
1946	5th	did not qualify
1947	4th	Semi-finalists
1948	5th	did not qualify
1949	6th	Wooden spoon
1950	6th	Wooden spoon
1951	3rd	Semi-finalists
1952	3rd	Semi-finalists
1953	3rd	Semi-finalists
1954	6th	Wooden spoon
1955	4th	Semi-finalists
1956	6th	did not qualify
1957	4th	Semi-finalists
1958	5th	did not qualify
1959	1st	Premiers
1960	2nd	Premiers
1961	1st	Premiers
1962	1st	Premiers
1963	1st	Premiers
1964	3rd	Premiers
1965	3rd	Semi-finalists
1966	1st	Premiers
1967	2nd	Runner-up
1968	4th	Semi-finalists
1969	1st	Premiers
1970	2nd	Runner-up
1971	4th	Semi-finalists
1972	6th	did not qualify
1973	3rd	Semi-finalists
1974	1st	Preliminary finalists
1975	2nd	Preliminary finalists
1976	8th	Wooden spoon
1977	4th	Semi-finalists
1978	8th	Wooden spoon
1979	5th	did not qualify
1980	4th	Premiers
1981	6th	did not qualify
1982	5th	did not qualify
1983	7th	did not qualify
1984	8th	Wooden spoon
1985	7th	did not qualify
1986	5th	did not qualify
1987	2nd	Semi-finalists
1988	6th	did not qualify
1989	3rd	Semi-finalists
1990	4th	Runner-up
1991	2nd	Semi-finalists
1992	3rd	Preliminary finalists
1993	7th	did not qualify
1994	12th	Wooden spoon
1995	11th	did not qualify

=== Queensland Cup ===
Season	Ladder position	Result
1996	9th	did not qualify
1997	7th	did not qualify
1998	1st	Premiers
1999	2nd	Preliminary Finalists
2000	5th	Preliminary Semi-Finalists
2001	4th	Preliminary Semi-Finalists
2002	5th	Preliminary Semi-Finalists
2003	8th	did not qualify
2004	2nd	Semi-Finalists
2005	2nd	Semi-Finalists
2006	7th	did not qualify
2007	8th	did not qualify
2008	11th	Wooden spoon
2009	5th	Semi-Finalists
2010	2nd	Runner-Up
2011	10th	did not qualify
2012	5th	Semi-Finalists
2013	6th	did not qualify
2014	8th	did not qualify
2015	13th	did not qualify
2016	11th	did not qualify
2017	11th	did not qualify
2018	8th	did not qualify
2019	5th	Finalists
2020	N/A	Competition cancelled
2021	1st	Premiers
2022	4th	Premiers
2023	11th	did not qualify
2024	2nd	Premiers

== Notable players ==
Ross henrick

- Clive Churchill
- Nick Geiger
- Cooper Cronk
- Herbie Farnworth
- Israel Folau
- Matt Gillett
- Greg Inglis
- Joe Kilroy
- Tyrone Roberts
- Andrew McCullough
- Ben Nakubuwai
- Shane Perry
- Mark Protheroe
- Billy Slater
- Cameron Smith
- Kevin Walters
- Steve Walters
- Jharal Yow Yeh
- Will Chambers
- Reece Walsh

== Greatest Team ==
On 16 August 2008 in the year of the Centenary of Rugby League, Norths Devils announced their greatest team ever. The team is made up of players in their entire 75-year tenure.

1. Harry Bates
2. Fonda Metassa
3. Jack Reardon
4. Henry Hegarty
5. Joe Kilroy
6. Bill Pearson
7. Jack Stapleton
8. Vic Rudd
9. Cameron Smith
10. Lloyd Weier
11. Trevor Gillmeister
12. Mark Graham
13. Edward "Babe" Collins
14. Mark Murray
15. Greg Inglis
16. Greg Conescu
17. Ian Massie

Coach:

1. Bob Bax

Manager:

1. Albert Bishop

== See also ==
- National Rugby League reserves affiliations
