= Ross Kidd =

Australian rugby league footballer

Personal information
- Full name: Ross Kidd
- Born: 25 July 1947 (age 77); Sydney, New South Wales, Australia

Playing information
- Position: Halfback
Club
Years	Team	Pld	T	G	FG	P
1966–69	Canterbury-Bankstown	52	8	0	0	24
- Source: As of 15 April 2019

Ross Kidd nicknamed "Grub" is an Australian former rugby league footballer who played in the 1960s. He played for Canterbury-Bankstown in the New South Wales Rugby League (NSWRL) competition.

== Background ==
Kidd played his junior rugby league for Chester Hill before signing with Canterbury in 1965.

== Playing career ==
Kidd made his first grade debut against Western Suburbs in 1966. In 1967, Kidd guided Canterbury to their first grand final in 20 years as they reached the final against South Sydney. Since their last grand final appearance in 1947, the club struggled towards the bottom of the table and only reached the finals once culminating in a last placed finish in 1964.

Kidd played at halfback in the 1967 NSWRL grand final as Souths took an early lead. Canterbury then regained the lead to be ahead 8-5 until Canterbury hooker Col Brown tried a looping pass which was intended to find fullback Les Johns only for Souths player Bob McCarthy to intercept the ball and race away to score a try. Souths then went on to kick a late goal to win the match 12–10. Kidd was guilty of giving away the penalty which lead to the goal.

After the grand final defeat, Canterbury finished a disappointing 9th in 1968 and 8th in 1969. Kidd featured less for Canterbury in the following seasons due to injury and by 1970 was captaining the third grade side. In total, Kidd made 74 games for Canterbury across all grades before retiring.
