= Leo Toohey =

Australian rugby league footballer

Personal information
- Full name: Leo Toohey
- Born: 16 June 1940 (age 84); Sydney, New South Wales, Australia

Playing information
- Position: Five-eighth
Club
Years	Team	Pld	T	G	FG	P
1962–63	Parramatta	31	4	1	0	14
1964–68	Canterbury-Bankstown	71	6	0	0	18
1969–71	North Sydney	36	7	0	0	21
	Total	138	17	1	0	53
- Source: As of 10 July 2019

Leo Toohey (born 16 June 1940) is an Australian former rugby league footballer who played in the 1960s and 1970s. He played for Canterbury-Bankstown, Parramatta and North Sydney in the New South Wales Rugby League (NSWRL) competition.

== Playing career ==
Toohey made his first grade debut for Parramatta in 1962. Toohey was part of the Parramatta side which reached their first ever finals series after years of struggling on the field since the club's inception in 1947. Toohey played at five-eighth in Parramatta's 6-0 loss to Western Suburbs at the Sydney Cricket Ground. The following year, Parramatta reached the finals again and Toohey played at five-eighth in Parramatta's first finals victory against Balmain. Parramatta would reach the preliminary final against the all conquering St George side but lost 12-7 at the SCG.

In 1964, Toohey left Parramatta and signed with rivals Canterbury-Bankstown. In his first season at the club, Canterbury finished last on the table and claimed the wooden spoon. In 1967, Toohey played 16 games as Canterbury reached the grand final against South Sydney. Along the way, Canterbury defeated St George 12-11 at the Sydney Cricket Ground in the preliminary final, ending St George's 11 year premiership reign. Toohey missed out on the grand final as Bob Doyle had been selected in his place. Canterbury would go on to lose to Souths 12-10.

In 1969, Toohey joined North Sydney. Toohey spent 3 seasons at Norths where the club failed to make the finals. Toohey retired at the end of 1971. In 2004, Toohey was nominated for the Berries to Bulldogs 70 Year Team of Champions.
