= John Smith (rugby league) =

New Zealand international rugby league footballer

Personal information
- Full name: John David Smith
- Born: 16 August 1955 Tokoroa, New Zealand

Playing information
- Position: Centre, Stand-off, Halfback
Representative
Years	Team	Pld	T	G	FG	P
1975–80	Auckland
1975	New Zealand Māori
1975–79	New Zealand	12	3	0	0	9

John David Smith is a New Zealand former rugby league footballer who represented New Zealand in the 1975 and 1977 World Cups.

== Playing career ==
In 1973 Smith was selected for an Auckland under-23 tour of Australia. The side won one and lost two matches and included future stars Dane O'Hara, John Wright and Stan Martin.

In 1975 Smith was selected for the New Zealand Māori squad and competed in the 1975 Pacific Cup. Smith also played for Auckland that season before being selected in the New Zealand national rugby league team for the 1975 World Cup. During the 1977 season Smith played in that year's World Cup and was also part of the Auckland side that completed a "grand slam" by defeating France, Australia and Great Britain in the space of 21 days. At the end of the year he won the New Zealand Rugby League's player of the year award. His final test matches were against Great Britain in 1979, he ended his career having played in twelve test matches and scored three tries.

Smith was part of the Auckland side that lost to Australia in 1980.
