= Whare Henry =

New Zealand rugby league footballer

Personal information
- Full name: Whare James Henry
- Born: New Zealand
- Height: 177 cm (5 ft 10 in)
- Weight: 102 kg (16 st 1 lb)

Playing information
- Position: Loose forward
Club
Years	Team	Pld	T	G	FG	P
	Marist (WRL)
	Eastern Suburbs (WRL)
	Total	0	0	0	0	0
Representative
Years	Team	Pld	T	G	FG	P
1975–1979	Wellington	25
1977	New Zealand	2	0	0	0	0
	Central Districts
- Relatives: Whetu Henry (brother)

Whare Henry is a New Zealand former rugby league footballer who represented New Zealand in the 1977 World Cup.

== Playing career ==
Henry moved to Wellington from Taupo in 1972. Henry played for both the Marist and Eastern Suburbs clubs in the Wellington Rugby League competition. He represented Wellington and Central Districts.

In 1977 he was selected for the New Zealand national rugby league team and he played in two matches at that year's World Cup.

== Personal life ==
Henry's brother, Whetu, played for the Kiwis alongside him in 1977. A nephew, also called Whetu, played for the Wellington Lions in 2011. Other relations include Alex Chan and Brackin Karauria-Henry.
