= Joe Gartner =

Australian rugby league footballer

Personal information
- Full name: Joseph Samuel Gartner
- Born: 16 January 1912 Marrickville, New South Wales, Australia
- Died: 1 February 2002 (aged 90) Wiley Park, New South Wales, Australia

Playing information
- Position: Centre
Club
Years	Team	Pld	T	G	FG	P
1931–35	Newtown	31	13	0	0	39
1936–41	Canterbury	56	31	0	0	93
	Total	87	44	0	0	132
- Relatives: Clive Gartner (son); Ray Gartner (son); Russel Gartner (grandson); Daniel Gartner (grandson); Renee Gartner (great granddaughter)

Joseph Samuel Gartner (1912–2002) was an Australian rugby league footballer who played in the 1930s and was a dual premiership winner.

== Playing career ==
Gartner was graded with Newtown in 1931 and went straight into first grade. Gartner was a prolific try scorer during his career and usually played on the wing. He played five seasons with Newtown between 1931 and 1935, which included winning a premiership with them in 1933. He then moved to Canterbury-Bankstown and played six seasons with them between 1936 and 1941. He won a further premiership with Canterbury in 1938 and he scored two tries in that match. He was the father of another Canterbury-Bankstown legend, Ray Gartner.

Gartner died on 1 February 2002, aged 90.
