= Renee Gartner =

Australian television presenter (born 1984)

- Born: 19 January 1984 (age 42)
- Father: Russel Gartner
- Relatives: Clive Gartner (great uncle); Daniel Gartner (cousin); Ray Gartner (great uncle); Joe Gartner (great grandfather)
- Presenting career
- Show: SportsFan Clubhouse
- Country: Australia

Renee Gartner is an entertainment personality, professional boxer, and television presenter from Australia, and daughter of rugby league player Russel Gartner. She was the media coordinator for the Australian Rugby League team The Gold Coast Titans. She fought as an amateur boxer in televised matches to raise funds for charity. She was an on-air panelist on the TV show SportsFan Clubhouse which aired on 7mate for three seasons from 2013 until 2015. She currently works on the Channel 9 NRL Footy Show as a producer.

== Boxing career ==
=== Professional boxing record ===
5 fights	4 wins	0 losses
By knockout	0	0
By decision	4	0
Draws	1	

== Personal life ==
In 2014 there were media reports that she was dating Australian rugby union player Quade Cooper.
