= Alan Scott (rugby league) =

Australian rugby league footballer (1939–2018)

Personal information
- Full name: Alan Frank Scott
- Born: 5 July 1939 Redfern, New South Wales, Australia
- Died: 15 July 2018 (aged 79)

Playing information
- Position: Second-row
Club
Years	Team	Pld	T	G	FG	P
1960	South Sydney	5	2	0	0	6
1962–64	Manly-Warringah	15	4	0	0	12
1966–69	South Sydney	30	2	0	0	6
	Total	50	8	0	0	24
- Source: As of 14 June 2019

Alan Frank Scott (5 July 1939 – 15 July 2018 was an Australian rugby league footballer who played in the 1960s.

== Playing career ==
Scott was graded from the Alexandria Rovers club in 1959. He played first grade for South Sydney in 1960, but accepted a contract with Manly-Warringah in 1961 and played with them for three seasons between 1962 and 1964.

He returned to South Sydney in 1965 and stayed until 1969. He won a premiership with Souths, playing second row in the 1967 Grand Final.
