= Chris Jordan (rugby league) =

New Zealand international rugby league footballer

Personal information
- Full name: Christopher Mark Jordan
- Born: 22 November 1953 (age 72) New Zealand

Playing information
- Position: Fullback, Centre, Five-eighth
Club
Years	Team	Pld	T	G	FG	P
	University (ARL)
	Ellerslie
	Total	0	0	0	0	0
Representative
Years	Team	Pld	T	G	FG	P
1975–80	Auckland
1977–78	New Zealand	5	2	16	0	38
- Father: Len Jordan

Chris Jordan is a New Zealand rugby league footballer who represented New Zealand in the 1977 World Cup. His father, Len, was a New Zealand international between 1946 and 1949.

== Playing career ==
Jordan played for the university club in the Auckland Rugby League competition, being coached by Jack Fagan. He later joined the Ellerslie club.

He was part of the Auckland side that defeated France 9–3 on 13 June 1975 at Carlaw Park in front of 10,000 fans. He was also part of the Auckland side that completed a famous "grand slam" in 1977 by defeating Great Britain, France and Australia in the space on 21 days.

Jordan made his international debut for the New Zealand national rugby league team in 1977 at the World Cup. Between 1977 and 1978 he played in five Test matches for the Kiwis, scoring two tries and sixteen goals for thirty eight points.
