= Darryl Fisher =

NZ rugby league footballer

Personal information
- Born: 15 April 1976 (age 50) Hamilton, New Zealand

Playing information
- Position: Wing
Club
| Years | Team | Pld | T | G | FG | P |
|---|---|---|---|---|---|---|
| 1996 | Waikato Cougars | 20 | 16 | 0 | 0 | 64 |
| 1998 | Western Suburbs | 10 | 3 | 0 | 0 | 12 |
| 2006 | London Skolars | | | 0 | 0 |
| | Total | 30 | 19 | 0 | 0 | 76 |

Coaching information
Representative
| Years | Team | Gms | W | D | L | W% |
| 2022 | Brazil | 1 | 0 | 0 | 1 | 0 |
| 2023– | South Africa | 3 | 1 | 0 | 2 | 33 |
- Source: As of 3 September 2026
- Father: Kevin Fisher

Darryl Fisher is a New Zealand former professional rugby league footballer, coach and administrator who played professionally for the Western Suburbs Magpies. His father, Kevin, represented New Zealand.

== Playing & Coaching career ==
Fisher first played for the Waikato Cougars in the 1996 Lion Red Cup. He was the Lion Red Cup Rookie of the Year that season. Fisher was also a member of the Cougars squad that won the inaugural Sky Challenge Cup in 1997 but was injured during the finals series.

Fisher then joined the Western Suburbs in the new National Rugby League competition and played ten matches for them during the 1998 season. Fisher continued with Wests until the end of the 2000 season in the NSW First Division competition.

Fisher was a member of the Waikato Rugby Union Sevens squad in 2001-2002 and was selected in New Zealand Sevens Training Squads during this time.

From 2003 until 2005 Fisher played for, and later became the assistant coach of, the Hibiscus Coast Raiders in the Bartercard Cup. In 2006 he, along with four Raiders players, travelled to the UK to Join London Skolars in Championship One where Fisher was both assistant coach and player.

In 2007 Fisher became the player-coach of the Orara Valley Axemen in the Group 2 Rugby League competition. In 2008 the club won the minor premiership and then went on to win the Grand Final. Fisher remained in the role until 2010 and then became the Club President. He served as president until 2011, leaving the area due to work commitments.

In 2013 Fisher coached Gold Coast Green in the Cyril Connell Cup In 2014 he coached Gold Coast Green in the Mal Meninga Cup as well as coaching the South East Queensland Under 16 side who were victorious in the under 16 state carnival Fisher then coached the Burleigh Bears Colts premiership winning side in 2015 In 2017 Fisher coached the Tweed Heads Seagulls A Grade side in the Gold Coast competition. Since 2018 he has served as an assistant coach with the Tweed Seagulls IntrustSuper Cup side
