= Daniel Gartner =

Australia international rugby league footballer

Personal information
- Full name: Daniel Gartner
- Born: 15 October 1972 (age 54) Sydney, New South Wales, Australia

Playing information
- Height: 191 cm (6 ft 3 in)
- Position: Second-row, Prop
Club
Years	Team	Pld	T	G	FG	P
1992–99	Manly Sea Eagles	120	35	0	0	140
2000	Northern Eagles	19	1	0	0	4
2000–03	Bradford Bulls	75	26	0	0	104
	Total	214	62	0	0	248
Representative
Years	Team	Pld	T	G	FG	P
1996	Australia	1	0	0	0	0
1997	City NSW	1	0	0	0	0
- Father: Clive Gartner
- Relatives: Ray Gartner (uncle); Russel Gartner (cousin); Joe Gartner (grandfather); Renee Gartner (2nd cousin)

Daniel Gartner (born 15 October 1972 in Sydney, New South Wales) is an Australian former rugby league footballer who played in the 1990s and 2000s. His position was second row forward and he played in Australia with the Manly-Warringah Sea Eagles. Gartner then played in England with the Bradford Bulls, winning championships with both clubs. He was also a representative player for Australia.

== Playing career ==
The son of Clive Gartner (Canterbury-Bankstown Bulldogs) and nephew of former Manly premiership player and international representative, Russel Gartner, Gartner was a vital member of the Manly-Warringah Sea Eagles premiership side in the 1996 Australian Rugby League competition forming part of a lethal back row that included Steve Menzies and Nik Kosef. In 1996, Gartner was selected to represent Australia.

Gartner also played for Manly in the club's 1995 and 1997 grand final defeats against Canterbury and Newcastle respectively. He played for Manly from 1992–1999. Gartner played in what was then the club's last game as a stand-alone entity in Round 26 1999 against the St George-Illawarra Dragons at WIN Stadium which ended in a 20–18 defeat.

Following the conclusion of the 1999 season, Manly were forced to merge with arch rivals North Sydney to form the Northern Eagles. Gartner was one of the players selected to be a part of the new side. Gartner made 19 appearances for the Northern Eagles in his only season with the team.

Gartner played for the Bradford Bulls from 2000 to 2003. He played for the Bradford Bulls at second-row forward in their 2001 Super League Grand Final victory against the Wigan Warriors. As Super League VI champions, the Bulls played against 2001 NRL Premiers, the Newcastle Knights in the 2002 World Club Challenge. Gartner played at second-row forward, scoring a try in Bradford's victory.

Gartner played for Bradford Bulls at second-row forward in their 2002 Super League Grand Final loss against St. Helens. He was later part of Bradford's Treble Winning 2003 Season. Gartner played for the Bradford Bulls at second-row forward in their 2003 Super League Grand Final victory against the Wigan Warriors.
