= Ray Gartner =

Australian rugby league footballer

Personal information
- Full name: Raymond William Gartner
- Born: 12 January 1934 Sydney, New South Wales, Australia
- Died: 24 January 1983 (aged 49) Greenacre, New South Wales, Australia

Playing information
- Position: Five-eighth
Club
Years	Team	Pld	T	G	FG	P
1953–64	Canterbury-Bankstown	185	46	0	0	138
- Father: Joe Gartner
- Relatives: Clive Gartner (brother); Daniel Gartner (nephew); Russel Gartner (nephew); Renee Gartner (great niece)

Raymond William Gartner (1934–1983) was an Australian rugby league player who played in the 1950s and 1960s.

== Playing career ==
Gartner had a long and successful career at Canterbury-Bankstown, playing eleven seasons and over 200 grade games between 1953 and 1964. He also captained the N.S.W. Colts against Great Britain in 1954. He was the son of Newtown and Canterbury legend, Joe Gartner.

Gartner died from leukaemia on 24 January 1983, aged 49.
