= Eddie Bowman =

English rugby league footballer (born 1944)

Personal information
- Full name: Edward Bowman
- Born: 12 November 1944 (age 81) Whitehaven, Cumberland, England

Playing information
- Height: 6 ft 0 in (183 cm)
- Weight: 14 st 0 lb (89 kg)
- Position: Second-row, Prop
Club
Years	Team	Pld	T	G	FG	P
1966–70	Whitehaven	69	19	0	0	57
1970–78	Workington Town	199	25	2	0	79
1978–80	Leigh	30+6	0	0	0	0
1980–81	Wigan	20	2	0	0	6
	Total	324	46	2	0	142
Representative
Years	Team	Pld	T	G	FG	P
1969–75	Cumberland	7+1	3	0	0	9
1977	Great Britain	4	1	0	0	3

Edward Bowman (born 12 November 1944) is an English former professional rugby league footballer who played in the 1960s, 1970s and 1980s. He played at representative level for Great Britain and Cumberland, and at club level for Whitehaven, Workington Town, Leigh and Wigan, as a prop, or second-row.

== Early life ==
Eddie Bowman was born in Kells, Whitehaven, on 12 November 1944. He grew up in Mirehouse and attended Kells Secondary School. He played junior rugby league for Kells, and was offered a professional contract by Whitehaven after a successful trial.

== Playing career ==
=== Club career ===
Bowman made his début for Whitehaven against Batley at Mount Pleasant, Batley, on Saturday 20 August 1966.

Bowman was transferred to Workington Town in 1970, and was a losing semi-finalist in the 1973, 1974 and 1975 Lancashire Cups. He won promotion with Workington Town in the 1975–76 Northern Rugby Football League season, and played in Workington Town's 16–11 defeat by Widnes in the 1976 Lancashire Cup Final during the 1976–77 season at Central Park, Wigan on Saturday 30 October 1976, the 16–13 victory over Wigan in the 1977 Lancashire Cup Final during the 1977–78 season at Wilderspool Stadium, Warrington on Saturday 29 October 1977, and the 15–13 defeat by Widnes in the 1978 Lancashire Cup Final during the 1978–79 season at Central Park, Wigan on Saturday 7 October 1978. He played his last game for Workington Town in the 5–13 defeat by Wakefield Trinity at Derwent Park, Workington on Sunday 22 October 1978.

In November 1978, Bowman was transferred to Leigh for a fee of £7,500. He made his début for Leigh in the 5–13 defeat by Wakefield Trinity at Hilton Park, Leigh on Sunday 10 December 1978, he played his last game for Leigh against New Zealand in 1980.

In November 1980, Bowman was signed by Wigan for a fee of £8,000. He made his début in the 15–2 victory over Fulham RLFC at Central Park, Wigan on Sunday 30 November 1980, he won promotion with Wigan in the 1980–81 Rugby Football League season, he played his last game for Wigan against York at Clarence Street, York on Sunday 8 November 1981.

=== Representative honours ===
Bowman won caps for Cumberland while at Whitehaven against Lancashire at Derwent Park, Workington on Wednesday 24 September 1969, while at Workington Town he scored a try against Lancashire at Wilderspool Stadium, Warrington in 1972, a try against Yorkshire at Crown Flatt, Dewsbury in 1975, and a try against Other Nationalities at Craven Park, Barrow-in-Furness in 1975.

Bowman won caps for Great Britain while at Workington Town in the 1977 Rugby League World Cup against France, New Zealand, and Australia (2 matches).
