= Christian Laskawiec =

France international rugby league player (1952–2021)

Personal information
- Born: 18 October 1952 Cagnac-les-Mines, Tarn, Occitania, France
- Died: 11 December 2021 (aged 69) Albi, France

Playing information
- Position: Centre, Wing
Club
Years	Team	Pld	T	G	FG	P
1970–83	Racing Club Albi XIII
Representative
Years	Team	Pld	T	G	FG	P
1972–77	France	4				6

Christian Laskawiec (18 October 1952 – 11 December 2021) was a French rugby league player. A winger and centre, he played the entirety of his professional career with Racing Club Albi XIII, which lasted from 1970 to 1983. He also appeared in four matches for the French national team, which compiled a record of one win and three losses with him in the game. He represented France at the 1977 European Rugby League Championship and at the 1977 Rugby League World Cup, under the captaincy of José Calle.

His brother, Gabriel Laskawiec, alongside which he player for Albi, was also a French rugby league international in the 1970s.

== Awards ==
- Winner of the Coupe de France Lord Derby (1974)
- Winner of the French Rugby League Championship (1977)
- Winner of the Rugby League European Championship (1977)
