= Terry Reynolds =

Australian rugby league footballer

Personal information
- Full name: Terry Reynolds
- Born: 27 January 1948
- Died: 18 October 2007 (aged 59)

Playing information
- Position: Scrum-half, Five-eighth
Club
Years	Team	Pld	T	G	FG	P
1968–71	Canterbury-Bankstown	47	11	0	1	34
1973–75	Parramatta	46	17	0	1	52
	Total	93	28	0	2	86
Representative
Years	Team	Pld	T	G	FG	P
1970	New South Wales	1	0	0	0	0
- Source: As of 12 Jul 2021

Terry Reynolds (27 Jan 1948 – 18 Oct 2007) was an Australian professional rugby league footballer who played in the 1960s and 1970s. He played for the Canterbury-Bankstown, Parramatta Eels and for the New South Wales Rugby League team. A halfback or five-eighth, Reynolds played 47 first grade games for Canterbury, 46 for Parramatta and one match for New South Wales between 1968 and 1975.

A brother of Canterbury first-grader Barry Reynolds, he joined Canterbury in 1966 when the Berries (as they were then known) were building up after a long period in the doldrums to become a major NSWRFL force for the first time since the 1940s. It was 1968 before Terry played first grade, but by the beginning of 1970 he had permanently replaced Ross Kidd as first grade halfback and was established as one of the best in the game and that season he played for New South Wales and later for a World Cup selection trial.

However, Reynolds’ speed and skill at halfback was already overshadowed by his flamboyant behaviour on the field — the Berries suspended him because he would not cut his long hair although he had it partly cut and was reinstated, playing with a headband. After further trouble in 1971 — during which season Reynolds had the distinction of potting the first one-point field goal in first grade — it was clear Reynolds would leave the Bulldogs.

North Sydney were originally considered likely to secure him, but by October he had signed with Parramatta after a bitter controversy over the required transfer fee. Moreover, Reynolds was suspended from playing in the first half of the 1972 season, and following the suspension he reneged on his Parramatta deal to play with Wollongong Wests. Reynolds eventually debuted for the Eels in 1973 after speculation he would play for Redcliffe in Brisbane, but faced competition from John Kolc, Kevin Hogan and latterly former South Sydney star Denis Pittard. Often playing five-eighth with Kolc at halfback, Reynolds rendered valuable service to the Eels as they struggled in 1973 and 1974, but back at halfback became renowned for working many tryscoring moves down the blindside with lock Quayle as the Eels began their sudden rise to prominence in 1975. In 1976, Reynolds continued with Parramatta in the pre-season Willis Cup, but a fractured jaw meant he did not play at all in first grade and forced his retirement, despite declaring at the beginning of the 1977 season that he would aim for a comeback.
