= Russel Gartner =

Australia international rugby league footballer

Personal information
- Born: 16 September 1955 (age 71)

Playing information
- Position: Centre, Wing
Club
Years	Team	Pld	T	G	FG	P
1975–81	Manly-Warringah	107	40	0	0	120
1982–83	Eastern Suburbs	32	6	0	0	21
1985–89	Balmain Tigers	99	29	0	0	116
	Total	238	75	0	0	257
Representative
Years	Team	Pld	T	G	FG	P
1977–78	NSW City Seconds	2	2	0	0	6
1977	New South Wales	2	0	0	0	0
1977	Australia	2	1	0	0	3
- Father: Jim Gartner
- Relatives: Clive Gartner (uncle); Daniel Gartner (cousin); Ray Gartner (uncle); Joe Gartner (grandfather); Renee Gartner (daughter); Keith Gartner (uncle)

Russel Gartner (born 16 September 1955), also known by the nickname of "Frog eyes", is an Australian former rugby league footballer who played in the 1970s and 1980s. An international representative three-quarter, He played for Manly-Warringah, Eastern Suburbs and Balmain in the NSWRFL premiership.

== Biography ==
Gartner came from a family with a strong rugby league background with his father Jim and uncle Clive playing for the Canterbury-Bankstown Bulldogs (all three were pacey outside backs), while his cousin Daniel Gartner, a back rower, would later also play for Manly-Warringah (winning a Premiership in 1996) and represent Australia.

A fast and tall Centre or Winger, Russel Gartner started playing first grade in the New South Wales Rugby Football League premiership in 1975 with the Manly-Warringah club. The following year he won his first premiership when he was part of the Sea Eagles' team that defeated Parramatta in the Grand Final. In 1977 Gartner was the League's top try-scorer with 17, three more than any other player in the premiership (North Sydney's Barry Wood and Gartner's former centre partner at Manly Bob Fulton who had joined Eastern Suburbs following Manly's 1976 premiership).

During the 1977 season, Gartner played two games for Australia in the 1977 Rugby League World Cup. After making his debut for Australia from the bench in a 21-9 win over France at the Sydney Cricket Ground on 11 June, Gartner was selected in the centres alongside Michael Cronin for the World Cup final two weeks later against a strong Great Britain side, again at the Cricket Ground. There he scored a spectacular 65-metre solo try which was a catalyst to Australia's eventual victory. Surprisingly his two World Cup games in 1977 would prove to be Gartner's only appearances in the green and gold. Gartner is listed on the Australian Players Register as Kangaroo No.501.

In 1978, Gartner was again a stand out performer for the Sea Eagles, scoring 10 tries for the season (second only in the team to winger Tom Mooney who crossed for 11), and playing in their drawn Grand Final against Cronulla-Sutherland, before scoring two tries, the second being a 70-metre effort where Manly threw the ball wide from a scrum and Gartner easily out paced the Cronulla chasers despite going into the match having torn his hamstring while scoring in the Preliminary final win over Western Suburbs, in the 16-0 rout of the Sharks in the Grand Final replay played just two days later. Following his two try performance in the Grand Final replay, Gartner was a shock omission from the 1978 Kangaroo tour in which 7 of his team mates (fullback Graham Eadie, halfbacks John Gibbs and Steve Martin, hooker and Sea Eagles captain Max Krilich, five-eighth Alan Thompson, and forwards Ian Thomson and Bruce Walker) were selected to tour. An eighth team mate, hard hitting second rower Terry Randall, was also selected but declined to tour citing exhaustion due to injuries and Manly's arduous finals campaign which saw the Sea Eagles play 6 finals games in just 24 days (as well as the Grand Final Replay, Manly also had to play a replay of their Semi-Final against Parramatta which was originally drawn 13–all). The coach of the Kangaroos was Manly coach Frank Stanton.

At the end of the 1981 season, Gartner transferred to the Eastern Suburbs club where he played for two years before moving to Balmain. He played on the wing for the Tigers in their 24-12 loss to Canterbury-Bankstown in the 1988 Grand Final, and was a non-playing reserve in their dramatic extra time loss to the Canberra Raiders in the 1989 Grand Final.

Russel Gartner retired from playing following the 1989 NSWRL season's Grand Final which Balmain reached, but did not select him for the team.
