= Whetu Henry =

New Zealand rugby league footballer

Personal information
- Full name: Whetu Edward Henry
- Born: New Zealand
- Height: 180 cm (5 ft 11 in)
- Weight: 114 kg (17 st 13 lb)

Playing information
- Position: Prop
Club
Years	Team	Pld	T	G	FG	P
	Marist (WRL)
	Eastern Suburbs (WRL)
	Total	0	0	0	0	0
Representative
Years	Team	Pld	T	G	FG	P
1973–??	Wellington
1977–78	New Zealand	4	0	0	0	0
- Relatives: Whare Henry (brother)

Whetu Henry is a New Zealand former rugby league footballer who represented New Zealand in the 1977 World Cup.

== Playing career ==
Henry moved to Wellington from Taupo in 1972. Henry played for both the Marist and Eastern Suburbs clubs in the Wellington Rugby League competition and represented Wellington.

He was first selected for the New Zealand national rugby league team in 1977 and played in that year's World Cup. In 1978 he toured Australia and Papua New Guinea with the Kiwis.

== Personal life ==
Henry's brother Whare played for the Kiwis alongside him in 1977. A nephew, also called Whetu, played for the Wellington Lions in 2011. Other relations include Alex Chan and Brackin Karauria-Henry.

In 1981 Henry was one of fourteen Eastern Suburbs players who were convicted of manslaughter in connection with the death of Mongrel Mob gang member Lester Epps.
