= Jean-Jacques Cologni =

Former France international rugby league footballer

Personal information
- Born: 15 January 1951 (age 74) La Réole, Gironde, Nouvelle-Aquitaine, France

Playing information
- Position: Second-row
Club
Years	Team	Pld	T	G	FG	P
19??–72	La Réole
1972–86	XIII Catalan
	Total	0	0	0	0	0
Representative
Years	Team	Pld	T	G	FG	P
1973–83	France	7				6

Coaching information
Representative
Years	Team	Gms	W	D	L	W%
1986–88	XIII Catalan
- Source: As of 12 February 2021
- Relatives: Aurélien Cologni (son)

Jean-Jacques Cologni (born in La Réole, on 15 January 1951) is a French former rugby league player and coach. He played as second-row.

== Biography ==
He debuted for La Réole, with which he debuted at senior level, later joining XIII Catalan in 1972 until his retirement as player in 1986. With XIII Catalan, he won the French Championship in 1979, 1982, 1983, 1984 and 1985. Due to his club performances, he is called up several times for the France national team between 1973 and 1983, taking part at the 1977 Rugby League World Cup. After his player career, he took a coaching career with XIII Catalan, winning the French Championship in 1987.

== Personal life ==
His son, Aurélien Cologni is also a rugby league player and coach. Outside the field, he worked as a firefighter.

== Honours ==
=== As player ===
- Team honours:
  - Winner of the Rugby League European Championship: 1977 (France)
  - Winner of the French Championship: 1979, 1982, 1983, 1984 and 1985 (XIII Catalan)
  - Winner of the Lord Derby Cup: 1976, 1978, 1980 and 1985 (XIII Catalan)
  - Runner-up at the French Championship: 1978. 1981 and 1986 (XIII Catalan)
  - Runner-up at the Lord Derby Cup: 1977, 1981 and 1983 (XIII Catalan)

=== As coach ===
- Team honours:
  - Winner of the French Championship: 1987 (XIII Catalan)
  - Runner-up at the Lord Derby Cup: 1987 (XIII Catalan)
