= Mark Thomas (rugby league) =

Australia international rugby league footballer

Personal information
- Born: 31 August 1955 (age 70) Brisbane, Australia

Playing information
- Position: Centre, Forward
Club
Years	Team	Pld	T	G	FG	P
19??–??	Brothers (Brisbane)
19??–??	Easts (Brisbane)
	Total	0	0	0	0	0
Representative
Years	Team	Pld	T	G	FG	P
1977	Queensland	3	0	0	0	0
1977	Australia	3	1	0	0	3

Mark Thomas is an Australian former professional rugby league footballer who played in the 1970s, 1980s and 1990s. A Queensland state and Australia national representative centre, he played his club football in Brisbane for Brothers and Eastern Suburbs.

== Playing career ==
In 1977 Thomas was selected to play for Queensland against New South Wales and against the visiting Great Britain team. He was then selected to go on the Australia national rugby league team's tour of New Zealand. He was then selected to play for Australia in the opening match of the 1977 World Cup tournament against New Zealand.

He retired from playing at the age of 27.
