= 1977 Rugby League World Cup =

8th Rugby League World Cup tournament

1977 World Cup
- Number of teams: 4
- Host countries: Australia; New Zealand
- Winner: Australia (5th title)
- Matches played: 7
- Attendance: 109,688 (15,670 per match)
- Points scored: 235 (33.57 per match)
- Top scorer: (United Kingdom) George Fairbairn (34)
- Top try scorers: (Australia) Allan McMahon (4) (Australia) Graham Eadie (4)

The 1977 Rugby League World Cup was the eighth World Cup held for men's national rugby league teams and hosted in Australia and New Zealand and ran between 29 May and 25 June. Australia were Champions after beating Great Britain in the Final at the Sydney Cricket Ground.

== Teams ==
| Team | Nickname | Coach | Captain |
|---|---|---|---|
| Australia (8th appearance) | The Kangaroos | Terry Fearnley | Arthur Beetson |
| New Zealand (8th appearance) | The Kiwis | Ron Ackland | Tony Coll |
| Great Britain (7th appearance) | The Lions | Reg Parker | Roger Millward |
| France (8th appearance) | Les Chanticleers | José Calle | Yves Bégou |

== Venues ==
| (Australia) Sydney | (Australia) Brisbane |
|---|---|
| Sydney Cricket Ground | Lang Park |
| Capacity: 70,000 | Capacity: 35,000 |
| (New Zealand) Auckland | (New Zealand) Christchurch |
| Carlaw Park | Addington Showground |
| Capacity: 20,000 | Capacity: 15,000 |

== Tour games ==
Great Britain and France arranged a number of tour games against local opposition during the World Championship, while Australia also played a short two-game tour for their visit to New Zealand.

Great Britain

| Date | Opponents | Score | Venue | Attendance |
|---|---|---|---|---|
| 7 June | Northern Maori | Won 18–14 | Huntly | 2,000 |
| 14 June | Auckland | Lost 10–14 | Auckland | |
| 26 June | Monaro | Lost 12–33 | Queanbeyan | 17,500 |
| 30 June | Queensland | Won 18–13 | Brisbane | 8,000 |
| 3 July | North Queensland | Lost 14–17 | Townsville | 6,000 |
| 9 July | New South Wales | Lost 5–35 | Sydney | 7,244 |
| 17 July | Southern Division | Won 54–6 | Gosford | 6,000 |

France

| Date | Opponents | Score | Venue | Attendance |
|---|---|---|---|---|
| 29 May | Papua New Guinea | Lost 6–37 | Port Moresby | 14,000 |
| 31 May | Brisbane | Lost 12–14 | Brisbane | |
| 7 June | Wellington | Won 8–0 | Wellington | 1,500 |
| 12 June | Newcastle | Lost 12–19 | Newcastle | 5,136 |
| 14 June | Toowoomba | Lost 10–14 | Toowoomba | 3,000 |

Australia

| Date | Opponents | Score | Venue | Attendance |
|---|---|---|---|---|
| 25 May | South Island | Won 68–5 | Christchurch | 2,500 |
| 1 June | Auckland | Lost 15–19 | Auckland | 10,000 |

== Matches ==
=== Group stage ===
| Team | Pld | W | D | L | PF | PA | PD | Pts | Qualification |
|---|---|---|---|---|---|---|---|---|---|
| Australia | 3 | 3 | 0 | 0 | 67 | 26 | +41 | 6 | Advances to the Final |
| Great Britain | 3 | 2 | 0 | 1 | 58 | 35 | +23 | 4 | Advances to the Final |
| New Zealand | 3 | 1 | 0 | 2 | 52 | 77 | −25 | 2 | |
| France | 3 | 0 | 0 | 3 | 33 | 72 | −39 | 0 | |

29 May

| New Zealand | 12 – 27 | Australia |

Carlaw Park, Auckland
Attendance: 18,000

5 June

| France | 4 – 23 | Great Britain |

Carlaw Park, Auckland
Attendance: 10,000

11 June

| Australia | 21 – 9 | France |

Sydney Cricket Ground, Sydney
Attendance: 13,231

12 June

| New Zealand | 12 – 30 | Great Britain |

Addington Showground, Christchurch
Attendance: 9,000

18 June

| Australia | 19 – 5 | Great Britain |

Lang Park, Brisbane
Attendance: 27,000

19 June

| New Zealand | 28 – 20 | France |

Carlaw Park, Auckland
Attendance: 8,000

=== Final ===
25 June

| Australia | 13–12 | Great Britain |
|---|---|---|
| Tries: Allan McMahon; Russel Gartner; John Kolc; Goals: Michael Cronin (2/4) | | Tries: Steve Pitchford; Ken Gill Goals: George Fairbairn (3/4) |

Sydney Cricket Ground, Sydney
Attendance: 24,457
Referee: Billy Thompson (England)
Player of the Match: John Kolc

| Australia | Great Britain |

| FB | 1 | Graham Eadie |
| RW | 2 | Allan McMahon |
| RC | 3 | Michael Cronin |
| LC | 4 | Russel Gartner |
| LW | 5 | Mark Harris |
| FE | 6 | John Peard |
| HB | 7 | John Kolc |
| LK | 8 | Greg Pierce |
| SR | 9 | Ray Higgs |
| SR | 10 | Arthur Beetson (c) |
| PR | 11 | Terry Randall |
| HK | 12 | Nick Geiger |
| PR | 13 | Greg Veivers |
Substitutions:
| IC | 14 | Denis Fitzgerald |
| IC | 15 | Mark Thomas |
Coach:
(Australia) Terry Fearnley

| FB | 1 | George Fairbairn |
| RW | 2 | Stuart Wright |
| RC | 3 | John Holmes |
| LC | 4 | Les Dyl |
| LW | 5 | Bill Francis |
| SO | 6 | Roger Millward (c) |
| SH | 7 | Steve Nash |
| LF | 8 | Phil Hogan |
| SR | 9 | Eddie Bowman |
| SR | 10 | Len Casey |
| PR | 11 | Jimmy Thompson |
| HK | 12 | Keith Elwell |
| PR | 13 | Steve Pitchford |
Substitutions:
| IC | 14 | Ken Gill |
| IC | 15 | Peter Smith |
Coach:
(Wales) David Watkins

After their 19–5 win over Great Britain a week earlier at Lang Park in Brisbane (which actually drew 2,543 more fans than the Final), the Australians went into the Final as warm favourites. However, led by experienced captain Roger Millward, the Lions managed to dominate possession throughout the game, and it took a last minute try from Australian halfback John Kolc (playing his only international game for Australia) to secure the Cup in front of 24,457 spectators at the Sydney Cricket Ground.

==== 1st Half ====
The Australians opened the scoring through Allan McMahon who scored in the Paddington corner. Michael Cronin kicked the sideline conversion and Australia led 5–0. Great Britain soon his back with a try to Steve Pitchford. George Fairbairn converted the try to lock the scores at 5–5. The match was then highlighted by a 60-metre try to Australian centre Russel Gartner who pounced on a dropped ball from Lions fullback Fairbairn after a Great Britain scrum win to race away and score. Only converging defence from Gartner's opposite number Les Dyl kept him from scoring closer to the posts, giving Cronin a difficult conversion from midway between the posts and the touch line. Cronin missed the attempt and the Australians led 8–5. Fairbairn then kicked a penalty goal to make the scores 8–7 closing in on half time.

Late in the first half the gritty and determined Lions were considered unlucky not to score when they were denied what would have been a certain try to winger Stuart Wright by English referee Billy Thompson. Wright had intercepted a pass from Cronin to Mark Harris 15 metres from the Australian line and was racing downfield with no one near him when Thompson called play back for an obstruction penalty to Great Britain rather than play advantage. Had Wright scored, and likely under the posts, it could have given the visitors a 12–8 lead going into the break. Instead, soon after Cronoin kicked a penalty goal from in front of the posts to make the score 10–7 going into half time.

==== 2nd Half ====
Australia took the lead out to 13–7 after a try to John Kolc in the Randwick corner in front of the Bradman Stand. Fairbairn had dropped a downfield kick by Cronin and the ball was pounced upon by Allan McMahon. From acting half, Kolc then dummied which fooled Fairbairn and Bill Francis and he raced away to score in the corner. Cronin missed the difficult kick from the sideline and the score remained at 13–7.

The Lions then hit back with a try under the posts to replacement back Ken Gill which was converted by Fairbairn to bring the scores to 13–12. After Kolc was penalised for using an elbow on Roger Millward who was chasing his own chip-kick, Fairbairn then had a late chance to give Great Britain the lead with a penalty goal from 45 metres out, though his went just to the right of the posts into the waiting arms of Australian fullback Graham Eadie who took full advantage of the Lions defence line still being near halfway to run the ball back outside the Australian quarter line.

== Try scorers ==
4

- (Australia) Graham Eadie
- (Australia) Allan McMahon

3

- (United Kingdom) Roger Millward
- (United Kingdom) Stuart Wright

2

- (France) Jean-Jacques Cologni
- (New Zealand) Kevin Fisher
- (New Zealand) John Smith

1

- (Australia) Denis Fitzgerald
- (Australia) Russel Gartner
- (Australia) Mark Harris
- (Australia) John Kolc
- (Australia) John Peard
- (Australia) Terry Randall
- (Australia) Mark Thomas
- (Australia) Greg Veivers
- (France) Jacques Guigue
- (France) Christian Laskawiec
- (France) Joël Roosebrouck
- (United Kingdom) Eddie Bowman
- (United Kingdom) Les Dyl
- (United Kingdom) Ken Gill
- (United Kingdom) Phil Hogan
- (United Kingdom) George Nicholls
- (United Kingdom) Steve Pitchford
- (New Zealand) Mark Graham
- (New Zealand) Chris Jordan
- (New Zealand) Alan Rushton
- (New Zealand) John Whittaker
