= Mirehouse, Whitehaven =

Settlement in Cumbria, England

Coordinates: 54.5306°N 3.5840°W

Mirehouse
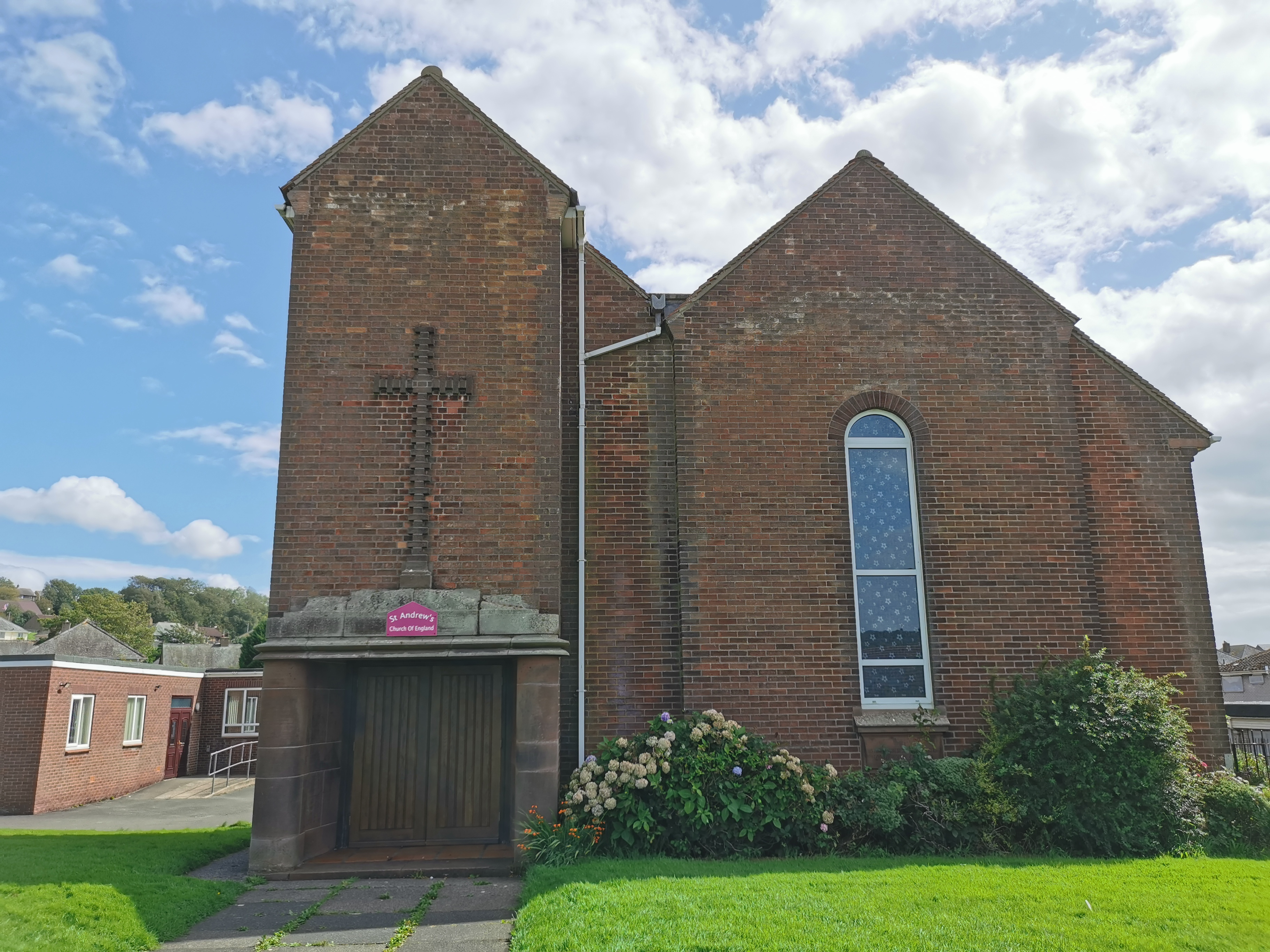
- St Andrew's Church

- Location in Copeland Borough Location within Cumbria
- Population: 5,481
- OS grid reference: NX9758916196
- Civil parish: Whitehaven
- Unitary authority: Cumberland
- Ceremonial county: Cumbria
- Region: North West
- Country: England
- Sovereign state: United Kingdom
- Post town: Whitehaven
- Postcode district: CA28
- Dialling code: 01946
- Police: Cumbria
- Fire: Cumbria
- Ambulance: North West
- UK Parliament: Whitehaven and Workington

Mirehouse /ˈməhʊsˈ/ is an area and ward in the English county of Cumbria and within the boundaries of the historic county of Cumberland. Mirehouse is 1.5 miles south of the town of Whitehaven near the A595 road. Mirehouse Estate, locally colloquially known as ‘The Valley’. The West was referred to 09 side and the East as 07 side, taken from the numbers of the bus routes that served them. The ward was 5,481 at the 2021 census.

== Churches ==
St Andrew is an active Anglican parish church in the deanery of Calder, and the diocese of Carlisle. Its benefice is Mirehouse.

St Benedicts is an active Roman Catholic Church Founded in 1961, right after the opening of the new church building at St Mary’s, Kells.

== School ==
Valley Primary School and Nursery is a community school for children from 3–11 years. It opened as a Primary School in September 2004 and has a capacity of 294. The Whitehaven Academy is the local 11–18 comprehensive.

== Facilities ==
On Meadow Road are Mirehouse Shops, Mirehouse Library and Mirehouse Post Office.

Mirehouse all has St Benedicts Rugby Union Football Club and a Labour Club.

There was once a pub named Crown and Anchor that is now a NISA supermarket.
