= Nick Geiger =

Australia international rugby league footballer

Personal information
- Born: 1952 (age 73–74)

Playing information
- Position: Hooker
Club
Years	Team	Pld	T	G	FG	P
	Norths (BRL)
1979	Penrith Panthers	5	0	0	0	0
	Total	5	0	0	0	0
Representative
Years	Team	Pld	T	G	FG	P
1977	Queensland	2	0	0	0	0
1977	Australia	4	0	0	0	0

Nick Geiger (born 1952) is an Australian former professional rugby league footballer who played in the 1970s. A Queensland state and Australia national representative hooker, he played in the Brisbane Rugby League premiership for the Norths club and in the New South Wales Rugby Football League premiership for the Penrith Panthers.

Whilst playing in the Brisbane Rugby League Premiership as the Norths side's hooker, Geiger had just served a three-match ban for a late tackle when he was selected to represent Queensland in the first match of 1977's interstate series against New South Wales due to the absence of Test hooker John Lang with a knee injury. He went on to play in the second and final match of that year's series as well. Later that year Geiger also gained selection in Australia's 1977 World Cup team. The selectors had originally chosen the Blues' George Peponis and omitted Queensland captain Arthur Beetson, but when Australian Rugby Football League president Kevin Humphreys refused to ratify the side, Beetson was reinstated, with the Queensland selectors putting in Geiger at the expense of Peponis. Geiger played the first of his four matches in total for Australia, making him Kangaroo No. 496. His last match for the Kangaroos was the closely contested 1977 Rugby League World Cup final against Great Britain, in which he played hooker and helped Australia to a one-point victory.

Geiger made some appearances for the Penrith Panthers in the 1979 NSWRFL season's Premiership, but after being replaced by local junior Steve Martin, he returned to Brisbane.

To celebrate its 75th anniversary, the Norths Devils club in 2008 included Geiger on its list of the greatest 75 players, coaches, administrators, volunteers and supporters.
