= Kevin Fisher (rugby league) =

NZ international rugby league footballer

Personal information
- Full name: Kevin Laurence Fisher
- Born: 1953 or 1954 New Zealand
- Height: 1.79 m (5 ft 10 in)
- Weight: 82 kg (181 lb; 12 st 13 lb)

Playing information
- Position: Wing
Club
Years	Team	Pld	T	G	FG	P
1972–1997	Huntly South
Representative
Years	Team	Pld	T	G	FG	P
	Waikato
1977–82	New Zealand	8	5	0	0	20
- Relatives: Darryl Fisher (son)

Kevin Laurence Fisher is a New Zealand former rugby league footballer, coach and manager who represented New Zealand in the 1977 World Cup.

== Playing career ==
A Huntly South player in the Waikato Rugby League, Fisher was also a Waikato representative, but was selected for top grade debut for the Northern Zone in 1973.

He was first selected for New Zealand in 1977, and participated at the World Cup that year. At 23 years of age, he scored a try in the Kiwi's world cup win over France at Carlaw Park before being dropped in 1978 for the Kiwi tour of Australia and Papua New Guinea. Fisher was re-selected for the 1980 New Zealand rugby league tour of Great Britain and France and the tour to Australia and Papua New Guinea in 1982. He played a total of eight test matches between 1977 and 1982.

== Later years ==
His son, Darryl, played for Waikato in 1996 and the Western Suburbs Magpies in 1998.

In 1997 Fisher coached Huntly South.

He managed Northern Districts in 2001 against France.

He also went on to manage the Junior Kiwis in both 2001 and 2002 in games against Australia.
