= José Calle =

France dual-code international rugby footballer (1945–2020)

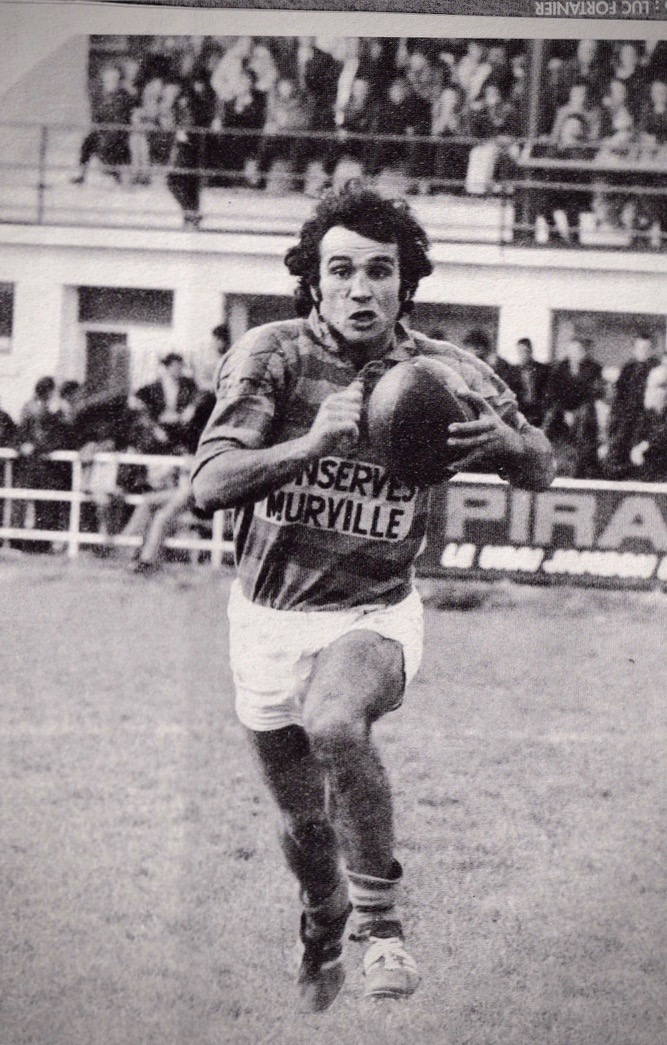

Personal information
- Full name: Joseph Calle
- Born: 12 February 1945 Perpignan, Pyrénées-Orientales, Occitania, France
- Died: 14 January 2020 (aged 74) Perpignan, France

Playing information

Rugby union
Representative
Years	Team	Pld	T	G	FG	P
1962–67	USA Perpignan

Rugby league
- Position: Fullback, Stand-off
Club
Years	Team	Pld	T	G	FG	P
	AS Saint-Estève
Representative
Years	Team	Pld	T	G	FG	P
1968–78	France	17	2	10	1	27

Coaching information
Club
Years	Team	Gms	W	D	L	W%
1985–87	AS Saint-Estève
- Source: As of 4 February 2021

José Calle (12 February 1945−14 January 2020) was a French rugby union and professional rugby league (RL) player who represented France (RL).

== Playing career ==
Calle learnt rugby union at the Haut Vernet Lay Centre in Perpignan. As a junior player he reinforced the senior team, then, joining the USA Perpignan rugby union team where he played alongside Jo Maso, he switched codes in 1968 and joined rugby league Saint-Estève.

With the Saint-Estève, he won a French Championship in 1971 and a Lord Derby Cup in 1972. His club performances allowed Calle to become captain and to represent France. He made his international debut in 1968 during a match in St. Helens against Great Britain. Calle disputed two World Cups in Australia, the first in 1975 and the second in 1977; in the latter he wore the captain armband. He took part in 26 international matches (Australia, England, Wales, Papua New Guinea). He played with the France national team in the first part of football matches, notably at the Stade Vélodrome in Marseille.

In 1978 he was awarded the XIII de Bronze trophy, which was given to outstanding championship players. After his international retirement in 1977, he embraced a club career in Saint-Estève, later notably coaching the Roussillon representative team of France Rugby League. After his retirement, he chose to play amateur rugby league, taking part in 3 international tournaments for the Basque Coast side Les Archiball in 1981, 1983 and 1986. He also took part in several UFAR tournament as player for the Nyn's (UFAR Perpignan in 2000) and was president of the Nyn's, a famous Catalan team of former rugby players, since 2013.
