= Col Brown =

Australian rugby league footballer

Personal information
- Full name: Col Brown
- Born: 31 October 1938 (age 86); Belmore, New South Wales, Australia

Playing information
- Position: Hooker, Lock
Club
Years	Team	Pld	T	G	FG	P
1960–70	Canterbury Bankstown	137	4	0	0	12

Col Brown is an Australian former professional rugby league footballer who played in the 1960s and 1970s. He played at club level for Canterbury Bankstown, as a hooker or lock.

== Early life ==
Brown was born in Belmore, Sydney, and played his junior rugby league for Lakemba United. Brown is one of four brothers to have played for Canterbury.

== Playing career ==
Brown made his first grade debut for Canterbury in 1960 against rivals Parramatta. Over the coming years, Brown became a regular in first grade and in 1967 the club reached its first grand final in a number of seasons defeating 11-year reigning premiers St George in the process. In the 1967 grand final against Souths, Brown started at hooker as Souths lead the match early on by a score of 5–2. Canterbury then regained the lead to be ahead 8-5 until Brown tried a looping pass which was intended to find Les Johns only for Souths player Bob McCarthy to intercept the ball and race away to score a try. Souths then went on to kick a late goal to win the match 12–10. Brown went on to play a further three seasons for Canterbury and retired at the end of 1970. Brown was later made a life member of the club after retirement.
