= Les Johns =

Australia international rugby league player

Personal information
- Full name: Leslie Howard Johns
- Born: 22 July 1942 (age 83) Newcastle, New South Wales, Australia

Playing information
- Position: Fullback
Club
| Years | Team | Pld | T | G | FG | P |
|---|---|---|---|---|---|---|
| | South Newcastle |
| 1963–71 | Canterbury-Bankstown | 103 | 14 | 233 | 19 | 545 |
| | Total | 103 | 14 | 233 | 19 | 545 |
Representative
| Years | Team | Pld | T | G | FG | P |
| 1962–69 | New South Wales | 16 | 3 | 74 | 3 | 163 |
| 1963–69 | Australia | 14 | 2 | 30 | 0 | 66 |

Leslie Howard Johns (born 1942 in Newcastle, New South Wales) is a former Australian professional rugby league footballer who played in the 1960s and early 1970s.

== Club career ==
Les Johns, of Welsh descent, started his career at Newcastle's Souths club.

He then played nine seasons for the Canterbury-Bankstown club between 1963 and 1971. He scored 14 tries and 233 goals and 19 field goals for Canterbury-Bankstown during his career.

He has been named among the nation's finest footballers of the 20th century. He was a fullback and on his day could for his attacking and defensive skills in the game.

He was forced to retire from rugby league in 1971 due to chronic knee injuries.

== Representative career ==
Johns played sixteen games for the New South Wales rugby league team between 1962 and 1969. He represented Australia on fourteen occasions between 1963 and 1969, first touring with the 1963/64 Kangaroos.

He is listed on the Australian Players Register as Kangaroo No.382.

== Accolades ==
In February 2008, Johns was named in the list of Australia's 100 Greatest Players (1908–2007) which was commissioned by the NRL and ARL to celebrate the code's centenary year in Australia.

He was made a life member of the Canterbury-Bankstown Bulldogs in 2011.

In 2010 Johns was also named in a South Newcastle team of the century.
