= 1984 Great Britain Lions tour =

Series of rugby union matches

- Date: 18 May 1984 – 5 August 1984
- Manager: Dick Gemmell
- Coach(es): Frank Myler
- Tour captain(s): Brian Noble
- Top point scorer(s): Mick Burke (80)
- Top try scorer(s): Ellery Hanley (12)
Summary
P	W	D	L
Total
24	16	0	8
Test match
7	1	0	6
Opponent
P	W	D	L
Australia
3	0	0	3
New Zealand
3	0	0	3
Papua New Guinea
1	1	0	0

Tour chronology
- Previous tour: 1979
- Next tour: 1988

The 1984 Great Britain Lions tour was the Great Britain national rugby league team's 17th tour of Australasia and took place from May to August 1984. A total of 24 matches were played against local club and representative sides during the tour, including a three match Test match series against Australia and New Zealand respectively, and one Test match against Papua New Guinea.

It was the first tour since 1950 in which Great Britain lost both series against Australia and New Zealand, and the first tour ever where they failed to win a Test against either team. They did however defeat Papua New Guinea in their only Test match.

== Touring squad ==
In preparation for the tour, Great Britain coach Frank Myler and tour manager Dick Gemmell invited a squad of 44 players to attend a series of training camps during the summer of 1983. In February 1984, a squad of 41 players was named, which would participate in weekly training sessions at Fartown, Huddersfield. Some clubs were unhappy with being asked to release players during the middle of the season, most notably Widnes, who had 10 players selected for the training squad. Prior to the second Test match against France on 17 February 1984, Widnes refused to make their players available for the training sessions – John Basnett was the only Widnes player who attended. Myler responded by excluding the absent players from Test selection, with Basnett being the only Widnes player named thus far.

Prior to the final squad for the tour being named, a number of players became unavailable for selection for various reasons. Steve Evans was unavailable due to his wedding plans in the summer, while John Woods withdrew due to "family and business commitments". Peter Smith announced he would not be available due to a shoulder injury. David Watkinson was also ruled out due to injury, suffering a broken leg in the first Test match against France. David Hall had recently taken over a public house and asked not to be considered, while John Wood withdrew for family reasons.

A 30-man squad for the tour was selected in April 1984. The squad included 18-year-old Garry Schofield, who became Great Britain's youngest ever tourist. After the squad was named, Len Casey was dropped after receiving a six-month suspension, while Great Britain captain Trevor Skerrett was ruled out due to injury. Wayne Proctor and Chris Arkwright were called up as replacements, and Brian Noble was named as team captain in place of the injured Skerrett. Shortly before the tour departed, Arkwright was withdrawn from the squad on medical advice because of a damaged knee, and was replaced by Terry Flanagan.

Name	Position	Club	Apps	Tests	Tries	Goals	Drop goals	Points	Notes
Mick Adams	Forward	Widnes	16	7	1	0	0	4	
Ray Ashton	Half-back	Oldham	7	0	1	0	0	4	
John Basnett	Threequarter	Widnes	9	0	6	0	0	24	(Note: Ronnie Duane returned home from the tour early due to injury. He was replaced by John Basnett.)
Kevin Beardmore	Forward	Castleford	11	1	7	0	0	28	
Mick Burke	Fullback	Widnes	15	7	2	36	0	80	
Chris Burton	Forward	Hull Kingston Rovers	12	5	0	0	0	0	
Brian Case	Forward	Wigan	13	4	1	0	0	4	
Garry Clark	Threequarter	Hull Kingston Rovers	10	0	7	0	0	28	
Lee Crooks	Forward	Hull	10	2	1	3	0	10	
Steve Donlan	Threequarter	Leigh	11	2	2	0	0	8	
Des Drummond	Threequarter	Leigh	17	7	11	0	0	44	
Ronnie Duane	Threequarter	Warrington	1	0	0	0	0	0	
Terry Flanagan	Forward	Oldham	9	2	0	0	0	8	
Des Foy	Threequarter	Oldham	8	1	5	0	0	20	
Andy Goodway	Forward	Oldham	13	7	5	0	0	20	
Andy Gregory	Half-back	Widnes	14	4	3	0	1	13	
Ellery Hanley	Half-back	Bradford Northern	17	7	12	3	0	54	
David Hobbs	Forward	Featherstone Rovers	16	6	2	15	0	38	
Neil Holding	Half-back	St Helens	10	4	3	0	1	13	
John Joyner	Threequarter	Castleford	11	2	1	0	0	4	
Joe Lydon	Threequarter	Widnes	14	4	4	26	0	68	
Keith Mumby	Fullback	Bradford Northern	16	7	5	0	0	20	
Tony Myler	Half-back	Widnes	10	5	1	0	0	4	
Brian Noble (c)	Forward	Bradford Northern	14	7	6	0	0	24	
Mike O'Neill	Forward	Widnes	11	0	0	0	0	0	
Harry Pinner	Forward	St Helens	7	0	0	0	0	0	
Wayne Proctor	Forward	Hull	11	1	6	0	0	24	
Keith Rayne	Forward	Leeds	13	2	1	0	0	4	
Garry Schofield	Threequarter	Hull	11	4	7	6	0	40	
Mike Smith	Threequarter	Hull Kingston Rovers	11	1	6	0	0	24	
Mick Worrall	Forward	Oldham	9	2	1	0	0	4	

== Australia ==
18 May 1984

Northern Territory	13 – 40	Great Britain Lions
Tries: Steve Larder; Goals: Brian Doyle (4); Drop goals: Steve Larder (1)	Report	Tries: Andy Goodway (2); Brian Noble (2); Steve Donlan; Des Drummond; Des Foy; Ellery Hanley; Goals: Lee Crooks (3); David Hobbs (1)

Richardson Park, Darwin
Attendance: 7,286
Referee: D. Corey

Northern Territory: Brian Doyle, Trevor Given, Scott Masterson, Brian Smith, Roy Albion, Steve Larder, Robert Harrison (c), Wayne Brown, Ray Lumby, Mick Jaeger, Noel Simmonds, Bruce McGuire, Kim Blackburn. Reserves – Dave Ryan, Phil Brown, John Adler. Coach – Ernie Wanka.

Great Britain: Keith Mumby, Des Drummond, Ronnie Duane, Ellery Hanley, Des Foy, Steve Donlan, Ray Ashton, Keith Rayne, Brian Noble (c), Andy Goodway, Mick Worrall, David Hobbs, Harry Pinner. Reserves – John Joyner, Neil Holding, Lee Crooks

23 May 1984

Riverina	18 – 22	Great Britain Lions
Tries: Brian Dennis; Michael Rawiri; Duncan Ward; Goals: brian Dennis (3)	Report	Tries: Mick Burke; Neil Holding; Joe Lydon; Goals: Mick Burke (5)

Eric Weissel Oval, Wagga Wagga
Attendance: 3,000
Referee: Bill Foran

Riverina: John Maguire, Brian Dennis, Michael Rawiri, John Sellar (c), Brian Costello, Tony Trudgett, Duncan Ward, Noel Hogan, Tony Morgan, Mick Lewis, Michael Scarfone, Graham Stockton, Ron Pilon. Reserves – Cliff Lyons, Trevor Pryce. Coach – Geoff Foster

Great Britain: Mick Burke, Garry Clark, Joe Lydon, Ellery Hanley, Garry Schofield, Mike Smith, Andy Gregory, Brian Case, Kevin Beardmore, Lee Crooks, Terry Flanagan, Andy Goodway, Mick Adams (c). Reserves – Neil Holding, Chris Burton

25 May 1984

North Coast	6 – 56	Great Britain Lions
Tries: Andrew Key; Goals: Chris Cordner (1)	Report	Tries: Des Drummond (3); Garry Clark (2); Joe Lydon (2); Neil Holding; Brian Noble; Wayne Proctor; Goals: Joe Lydon (8)

Lank Bain, Wauchope
Attendance: 4,200
Referee: Bill Sullivan

North Coast: Andy Mulvany, Wayne Buckley, Chris Cordner, Gary Night, Greg Davis, Rocky Laurie (c), Tony Hinton, Matt Welsh, Andrew Key, Daryl Warwick, Terry Corfe, Mark Hurrell, Glen Anderson. Reserves – Steve Foley, Jim Coombes, Richard Laurie, Maurie Kelly. Coach – Kevin Hardy

Great Britain: Keith Mumby, Des Drummond, Joe Lydon, John Joyner, Garry Clark, Steve Donlan, Neil Holding, Keith Rayne, Brian Noble (c), Mike O'Neill, Wayne Proctor, Mick Worrall, Mick Adams. Reserves – Ray Ashton, David Hobbs, Chris Burton

27 May 1984

Western Division	30 – 36	Great Britain Lions
Tries: Lee Douglas; Les Haynes; Steve McWhirter; Mark Smith; Goals: Brad Jayett (7/7)	Report	Tries: Des Foy (3); Ray Ashton; Lee Crooks; Keith Mumby; Brian Noble; Goals: Mick Burke (4)

Victoria Park, Dubbo
Attendance: 4,528
Referee: Lance Harrigan

Western Division: Marty Gordon, Les Haynes, Mark Smith, Ray Spurr, Wilfred Williams, Steve McWhirter (c), Lee Douglas, Colin Wright, Ian Jackson, Alan McPhail, Brad Jayett, Steve Miller, Mark Horton. Reserves – Neil Moy, Ken Fisher. Coach – Ted Goodwin

Great Britain: Mick Burke, Des Drummond, Joe Lydon, Keith Mumby, Des Foy, Tony Myler, Ray Ashton, Keith Rayne, Brian Noble (c), Lee Crooks, Chris Burton, Andy Goodway, Harry Pinner. Reserves – Garry Schofield, David Hobbs

30 May 1984

North Sydney Bears	8 – 14	Great Britain Lions
Tries: Chris Luckman; Andrew Simons	Report	Tries: Des Drummond; Andy Goodway; Goals: Mick Burke (3)

Sydney Cricket Ground, Sydney
Attendance: 4,067
Referee: Barry Barnes
Player of the Match: Andy Goodway

North Sydney: Wayne Portlock, Alan Sheppard, Neigel Tait, Simon Brockwell, Andrew Simons, Wayne Lonergan, Laurie Spina, Lindsay Johnson, Phil Ritchie, Don McKinnon, Bob Cooper, Peter Cross, Graeme Jennings (c). Reserves – Stephen Casey, Chris Luckman, Errol Hillier. Coach – John Hayes

Great Britain: Mick Burke, Garry Clark, Garry Schofield, Keith Mumby, Des Foy, Steve Donlan, Andy Gregory, Keith Rayne, Kevin Beardmore, Lee Crooks, David Hobbs, Andy Goodway, Mick Adams (c). Reserves – Mick Worrall, Brian Case

2 June 1984

Newcastle Firsts	18 – 28	Great Britain Lions
Tries: Craig Higgins; Gary Martine; Goals: Neville Elwin (5)	Report	Tries: Garry Clark; Terry Flanagan; Ellery Hanley; Neil Holding; Garry Schofield; Goals: Mick Burke (4/6)

Newcastle International Sports Centre, Newcastle
Attendance: 10,000
Referee: Barry Priest

Newcastle Firsts: Neville Elwin, Mark Bates, Kyle Connor, Craig Dedman, Glenn Murray, Greg Eager, Craig Higgins, Milton Burrows, Rex Wright, John Farrar, Mal Graham, Michael Pitman, Gary Martine (c). Reserves – Robert Taylor, Peter Garbutt. Coach – Terry Pannowitz

Great Britain: Mick Burke, Garry Clark, Ellery Hanley, Mike Smith, John Basnett, Garry Schofield, Neil Holding, Mike O'Neill, Brian Noble (c), Lee Crooks, David Hobbs, Mick Worrall, Terry Flanagan. Reserves – Joe Lydon, Harry Pinner

=== First Test ===
Wally Lewis won a well publicised power struggle between the NSW Rugby League and their Queensland Rugby League counterparts for the vacated Australian captaincy. NSW wanted their captain Ray Price to have the Australian captaincy as he was retiring from representative football at the end of the series. Queensland naturally went for their State of Origin captain Lewis. With the 1986 Kangaroo Tour only just over 2 years away, the Australian Rugby League settled the issue by naming Lewis as the 12th Queenslander to captain Australia.

In scene's of poor sportsmanship, some elements of the 30,190 SCG crowd actually booed Wally Lewis when he was announced as he ran onto the field. With Queensland having dominated state football during the early 1980s, their captain and Kingpin Lewis was seen as the enemy to the Sydney crowds, even when wearing the Australian team colours.

9 June 1984

Australia	25 – 8	Great Britain
Tries: Kerry Boustead; Wally Lewis; Mark Murray; Ray Price; Goals: Ross Conlon (4/6); Field goals: Wally Lewis (1)		Tries: Garry Schofield; Goals: Mick Burke (2/3)

Sydney Cricket Ground, Sydney
Attendance: 30,190
Referee: Ray Shrimpton (New Zealand)
Player of the Match: Wally Lewis

Australia	Position	Great Britain
Garry Jack	FB	Mick Burke
Ross Conlon	WG	Des Drummond
Gene Miles	CE	Garry Schofield
Brett Kenny	CE	Keith Mumby
Kerry Boustead	WG	Ellery Hanley
Wally Lewis (c)	FE/SO	Des Foy
Mark Murray	HB/SH	Neil Holding
Dave Brown	PR	Andy Goodway
Greg Conescu	HK	Brian Noble (c)
Greg Dowling	PR	Lee Crooks
Bryan Niebling	SR	Chris Burton
Wayne Pearce	SR	Mick Worrall
Ray Price	LK/LF	Mick Adams
Craig Young	Int.	Joe Lydon
Chris Close	Int.	David Hobbs
Frank Stanton	Coach	Frank Myler

With less than 5 seconds remaining in the test, reserve Lions forward David Hobbs was sent off for a sickening hit on Australian hooker Greg Conescu. Television replays showed Conescu running from dummy half before Hobbs hit him with a raised elbow, hitting him in the mouth and resulting in the loss of some of his top teeth. Conescu was stretchered from the field and was still in the hands of the Australian team Dr. Bill Monoghan when local TV broadcaster Channel 9's Darrell Eastlake did his post match interview inside the SCG change rooms with the player of the match, new Australian captain Wally Lewis.

Hobbs had only been on the field for 8 minutes before his send-off.

11 June 1984

Wide Bay	18 – 28	Great Britain Lions
Tries: Paul Gorman; Ray Ovens; Ron Slater; Goals: Gary Birmingham (3)	Report	Tries: John Basnett; Kevin Beardmore; Ellery Hanley; Wayne Proctor; Mick Worrall; Goals: Joe Lydon (4)

Salter Oval, Bundaberg
Attendance: 2,336
Referee: Mick Hourigan

Wide Bay: Gary Birmingham, Les Kiss, Paul Gorman, Mike Curran, Neville King, Jim Browning, Ray Ovens, Mike McDougall, David Gerrard, Steve Molineux, Ray Harch, Ray Berkery, Ron Slater (c). Reserves – Noel Glazier, Bill Dansey. Coach – John Reddy

Great Britain: Joe Lydon, Garry Clark, Mike Smith, Ellery Hanley, John Basnett, John Joyner (c), Andy Gregory, Mike O'Neill, Kevin Beardmore, Brian Case, Wayne Proctor, Terry Flanagan, Harry Pinner. Reserves – Tony Myler, Mick Worrall

15 June 1984

Central Queensland	12 – 44	Great Britain Lions
Tries: Michael Anderson; Mike Curran; Goals: Andrew McDonald (2)	Report	Tries: Garry Schofield (4); Wayne Proctor (2); Des Drummond; Keith Mumby; Goals: Garry Schofield (5/6); Mick Burke (1)

Browne Park, Rockhampton
Attendance: 5,671
Referee: Les McCosh

Central Queensland: Shane Tupaea, Warren McLaughlin, Andrew McDonald, Russell Miller, Mike Curran, Jamie Jansen, Geoff Hunt, David Day, Craig Taylor, Peter Blackadder, Steve George, Michael Anderson, Ian Brazier. Reserves – Peter Golder, Tony Hansan. Coach – Bill Nosworthhy

Great Britain: Mick Burke, Des Drummond, Garry Schofield, Keith Mumby, Ellery Hanley, Tony Myler, Andy Gregory, Keith Rayne, Brian Noble (c), Andy Goodway, Wayne Proctor, Chris Burton, Mick Worrall. Reserves – Ray Ashton, Mick Adams

17 June 1984

North Queensland	20 – 38	Great Britain Lions
Tries: Bruce Barclay; Marshall Colwell; Larry Foran; Les Morrissey; Goals: Mike Smith (2)	Report	Tries: Des Drummond (2); Ellery Hanley (2); John Basnett; Kevin Beardmore; Mike Smith; Goals: Joe Lydon (5)

Townsville Sports Reserve, Townsville
Attendance: 6,036
Referee: Barry Gomersall

North Queensland: Rod Brunker, Larry Foran, Harry Deemal, Glen Pengelly, Dale Shearer, Darryl Duncan, Robbie Price, Marshall Colwell (c), Frank Baker, Mike Smith, Paul Bleakney, Les Morrissey, Kevin Bocos. Reserves – Bob Keogh, Bruce Barclay. Coach – Will Cordwell

Great Britain: Joe Lydon, Des Drummond, Ellery Hanley, Mike Smith, John Basnett, John Joyner (c), Ray Ashton, Lee Crooks, Kevin Beardmore, Brian Case, Wayne Proctor, Mike O'Neill, Harry Pinner. Reserves – Des Foy, Mick Adams

20 June 1984

Toowoomba	18 – 16	Great Britain Lions
Tries: Jeff Coutts; Steve Gibson; Dan Stains; Goals: Jeff Coutts (3)	Report	Tries: John Basnett; Garry Clark; Mike Smith; Goals: David Hobbs (2)

Athletic Oval, Toowoomba
Attendance: 4,051
Referee: Wayne Giebel

Toowoomba: Peter Gill, Steve Gibson, Greg Milne, Jeff Coutts, Bryan Tynan, Robbie Tew, Wayne Smith, Peter McKinnon, Paul Fitzgerald, Neil McCullagh, Mark Hohn, Robbert Hanna, Dan Stains. Reserves – Wayne Reis, Graham Smith. Coach – Don Oxenham

Great Britain: Steve Donlan, Garry Clark, Mike Smith, Des Foy, John Basnett, John Joyner (c), Andy Gregory, Mike O'Neill, Kevin Beardmore, Brian Case, Wayne Proctor, David Hobbs, Harry Pinner. Reserves – Ray Ashton, Mick Adams

=== Second Test ===
Mal Meninga's selection ahead of Brett Kenny and goal kicking Ross Conlon for the test at Lang Park drew criticism from south of the border in Sydney. The future Australian team captain and Rugby League Immortal wasn't in great playing or goal kicking form either for Souths Magpies in the Brisbane premiership or Queensland earlier in the season and it was generally believed that his selection was only to have another Queenslander in the Australian team in Brisbane to draw a bigger crowd.

Meninga would go on to have a strong game in the Green and Gold, scoring a second half try (for which he copped knees in the back from Chris Burton after he scored), although his goal kicking was slightly off only kicking 3/7. This saw him retained for the third Test in Sydney.

26 June 1984

Australia	18 – 6	Great Britain
Tries: Eric Grothe; Mal Meninga; Wayne Pearce; Goals: Mal Meninga (3/7)		Tries: Garry Schofield; Goals: Mick Burke (1/2)

Lang Park, Brisbane
Attendance: 26,534
Referee: Ray Shrimpton (New Zealand)
Player of the Match: Wayne Pearce

Australia	Position	Great Britain
Garry Jack	FB	Mick Burke
Eric Grothe	WG	Des Drummond
Mal Meninga	CE	Garry Schofield
Gene Miles	CE	Keith Mumby
Kerry Boustead	WG	Ellery Hanley
Wally Lewis (c)	FE/SO	Tony Myler
Mark Murray	HB/SH	Neil Holding
Greg Dowling	PR	Keith Rayne
Greg Conescu	HK	Brian Noble (c)
Dave Brown	PR	Lee Crooks
Bryan Niebling	SR	Chris Burton
Paul Vautin	SR	Andy Goodway
Wayne Pearce	LK/LF	Mick Worrall
Steve Mortimer	Int.	Andy Gregory
Wally Fullerton Smith	Int.	Mick Adams
Frank Stanton	Coach	Frank Myler

Recalled Queensland and Manly-Warringah second rower Paul Vautin copped an accidental elbow to the cheek in the 76th minute of the game from Lions replacement Mick Adams causing a fractured cheek bone. TV replays showed it to be accidental. Vautin was one of 3 tackling Adams and in bracing himself with his ball carrying right arm, Fatty coming in from the right side copped the elbow. It would see him miss 3 weeks of the Winfield Cup.

Wally Lewis was felled 3 times during the game after late tackles. In a case of mistaken identity, British front rower Keith Rayne was sent to the sin-bin for 10 minutes during the first half for an offence (late high elbow on Lewis) actually committed by Mick Adams. Rayne was also sent to the bin for 5 minutes in the 73rd minute when he caught Lewis with a late swinging arm that sparked a short-lived all-in mele. In the Australian set after that all-in, another mele was almost sparked when Lions captain Brian Noble went in for another late swinging arm on Lewis, only for his opposing captain to raise his own right elbow which caught Noble high and by surprise. Kiwi referee Ray Shrimpton was able to calm things before it got out of hand again.

Great Britain scored arguably their best try on tour in the second half. In a move started on their own 22 by Tony Myler running from dummy-half and passing the ball to Neil Holding who moved the ball on to a running Garry Schofield who got the ball outside to speedster Des Drummond. Drummond stepped inside of a tiring Vautin and then back outside to evade Lewis before passing back to a still alive Schofield. The Hull teenager then sped diagonally across the field into Australia's half evading a diving Mark Murray in the process before linking with Drummond back on the inside as fullback Garry Jack loomed. Shadowed by Kerry Boustead, Drummond then got the ball back to Andy Goodway in support who managed to get the ball to a flying Schofield as Jack took him down by the legs. Holding off a Boustead's last-ditch effort over the last 3 metres, Scofield scored his second try of the series in the corner.

28 June 1984

Northern Rivers	12 – 24	Great Britain Lions
Tries: Gerry O'Neill (2); Goals: David Hall (1); Troy Hughes (1)	Report	Tries: Garry Clark; Des Drummond; David Hobbs; Mike Smith; Goals: David Hobbs (2); Joe Lydon (2)

Chris Cunningham Field, Tweed Heads
Attendance: 3,537
Referee: Steve Asbury

Northern Rivers: Peter O'Neill, Dale Miles, Alan Howie, Mick Ryan, Gerry O'Neill, Troy Hughes, Tony Kennedy, Ron Ferris, Jay Clarke (c), Kel Judd, Scott Dorrough, Mark Brokenshire, Shane Miles. Reserves – David Hall. Coach – Stan Damro

Great Britain: Joe Lydon, Des Drummond, Garry Schofield, Mike Smith (c), Garry Clark, Steve Donlan, Andy Gregory, Mike O'Neill, Kevin Beardmore, Brian Case, Wayne Proctor, David Hobbs, Harry Pinner. Reserves – Des Foy, Mick Worrall

1 July 1984

Northern Division NSW	18 – 32	Great Britain Lions
Tries: Geoff Carr; Greg Donnelly; Kevin Hill; Goals: Greg Donnelly (3)	Report	Tries: Ellery Hanley (2); Brian Case; Joe Lydon; Mike Smith; Goals: Joe Lydon (6)

Scully Park, Tamworth
Attendance: 6,750
Referee: Neville Hockey

Northern Division: Greg Donnelly, Miles Archdale, Mick McCann, John Lennan (c), Robert Brady, Kevin Hill, Robbie McCormack, Merv Haywood, Brad Frazer, Ross Whitaker, Jack Thompson, Geoff Carr, Greg McCormack. Reserves – Joe Craigie, Arthur Earl. Coach – Jim Cox

Great Britain: Joe Lydon, Des Drummond, Ellery Hanley, Mike Smith, Garry Clark, Tony Myler, Ray Ashton, Keith Rayne, Kevin Beardmore, Brian Case, David Hobbs, Mike O'Neill, Mick Adams (c). Reserves – Neil Holding, Wayne Proctor

=== Third Test ===
7 July 1984

Australia	20 – 7	Great Britain
Tries: Greg Conescu; Eric Grothe; Garry Jack; Goals: Mal Meninga (4/9)		Tries: Ellery Hanley; Goals: Mick Burke (1/2); Drop goals: Neil Holding (1)

Sydney Cricket Ground, Sydney
Attendance: 18,756
Referee: Tony Drake (New Zealand)
Player of the Match: Wayne Pearce

Australia	Position	Great Britain
Garry Jack	FB	Mick Burke
Eric Grothe	WG	Des Drummond
Mal Meninga	CE	Garry Schofield
Gene Miles	CE	Keith Mumby
Kerry Boustead	WG	Ellery Hanley
Wally Lewis (c)	FE/SO	Tony Myler
Steve Mortimer	HB/SH	Neil Holding
Bryan Niebling	PR	David Hobbs
Greg Conescu	HK	Brian Noble (c)
Greg Dowling	PR	Brian Case
Wally Fullerton Smith	SR	Chris Burton
Wayne Pearce	SR	Andy Goodway
Ray Price	LK/LF	Mick Adams
Brett Kenny	Int.
Dave Brown	Int.
Frank Stanton	Coach	Frank Myler

== New Zealand ==
10 July 1984
15:00

Northern Districts	8 – 42	Great Britain Lions
Tries: Rusty Campbell; Dick Smeath		Tries: Mick Adams; John Basnett; Kevin Beardmore; Garry Clark; Andy Gregory; John Joyner; Mike O'Neill; Mike Smith; Goals: David Hobbs (4); Garry Schofield (1)

Jubilee Park, Whangārei
Attendance: 1,600
Referee: Kevin Bailey

Northern Districts: George Huriwai, Shane Horo, George Baker, Terry Rapana, Chris Curtis, Russell Stewart, Neville Ramsey, Pat Poasa, Terrance Perihi, James Toa, Tom Murray, Darren Harris, Rusty Campbell. Reserves – Glenn Donaldson, Dick Smeath. Coach – Laurie Stubbing

Great Britain: Keith Mumby, Garry Clark, Mike Smith, John Joyner (c), John Basnett, Steve Donlan, Andy Gregory, David Hobbs, Kevin Beardmore, Keith Rayne, Wayne Proctor, Mike O'Neill, Mick Adams. Reserves – Garry Schofield, Brian Case

=== First Test ===
14 July 1984

New Zealand	12 – 0	Great Britain
Tries: Fred Ah Kuoi; James Leuluai; Goals: Olsen Filipaina (2/3)

Carlaw Park, Auckland
Attendance: 10,238
Referee: Kevin Roberts (Australia)
Player of the Match: Dane Sorensen

New Zealand	Position	Great Britain
Gary Kemble	FB	Mick Burke
Dean Bell	WG	Ellery Hanley
James Leuluai	CE	Garry Schofield
Fred Ah Kuoi (c)	CE	Keith Mumby
Dane O'Hara	WG	Des Drummond
Olsen Filipaina	FE/SO	Mike Smith
Shane Varley	HB/SH	Neil Holding
Kevin Tamati	PR	David Hobbs
Howie Tamati	HK	Brian Noble (c)
Dane Sorensen	PR	Brian Case
Kurt Sorensen	SR	Chris Burton
Owen Wright	SR	Andy Goodway
Hugh McGahan	LK/LF	Mick Adams
Clayton Friend	Int.
Graham Lowe	Coach	Frank Myler

15 July 1984

New Zealand Māori	8 – 19	Great Britain Lions
Tries: Dick Uluave; Goals: Nick Wright (2)	Report	Tries: Kevin Beardmore; Terry Flanagan; Des Foy; Goals: Ellery Hanley (3); Drop goals: Andy Gregory (1)

Davies Park, Huntly
Attendance: 2,392

New Zealand Māori: Nick Wright, Dick Uluave, Cedrick Lovett, Joe Ropati, Lou Kapa, Ron O'Regan (c), Gerard Katene, Riki Cowan, Tracey McGregor, Anthony Murray, Russell Tuuta, Ian Bell, Chappie Pine. Reserves – Tom Waitai, Pat Poasa. Coach – Tom Newton

Great Britain: Keith Mumby, Des Drummond, Joe Lydon, Des Foy, John Basnett, John Joyner (c), Andy Gregory, Keith Rayne, Kevin Beardmore, Lee Crooks, Wayne Proctor, Mike O'Neill, Terry Flanagan. Reserves – Ellery Hanley, Chris Burton

18 July 1984

Central Districts	6 – 38	Great Britain Lions
Tries: Rodney Rasmussen; Goals: Dale Miritana (1)		Tries: Andy Gregory (2); Brian Noble (2); Garry Clark; Steve Donlan; Mike Smith; Goals: Mick Burke (4/6); Joe Lydon (1)

Basin Reserve, Wellington
Attendance: 2,051

Central Districts: Dale Miritana, Willie Tangira, George Lajpold, Lou Kapa, Wayne Rutene, Lance Pupuke, Gerard Katene, Rodney Rasmussen (c), Mike Kuiti, Whare Henry, Bruce Harvey, Sam Stewart, Chappie Pine. Reserves – Dick Uluave, Alan Jackson. Coach –

Great Britain: Mick Burke, Garry Clark, Steve Donlan, Mike Smith, John Basnett, Tony Myler, Andy Gregory, Keith Rayne, Brian Noble (c), Mike O'Neill, Terry Flanagan, Brian Case, John Joyner. Reserves – Joe Lydon

=== Second Test ===
22 July 1984

New Zealand	28 – 12	Great Britain
Tries: Dane O'Hara (2); Fred Ah Kuoi; Dean Bell; James Leuluai; Goals: Olsen Filipaina (4/7)		Tries: Ellery Hanley; Tony Myler; Goals: Mick Burke (2/2)

Addington Showgrounds, Christchurch
Attendance: 9,824
Referee: Barry Barnes (Australia)
Player of the Match: Dane Sorensen

New Zealand	Position	Great Britain
Gary Kemble	FB	Mick Burke
Dean Bell	WG	Joe Lydon
James Leuluai	CE	Ellery Hanley
Fred Ah Kuoi (c)	CE	Keith Mumby
Dane O'Hara	WG	Des Drummond
Olsen Filipaina	FE/SO	Tony Myler
Shane Varley	HB/SH	Neil Holding
Kevin Tamati	PR	David Hobbs
Howie Tamati	HK	Brian Noble (c)
Dane Sorensen	PR	Brian Case
Kurt Sorensen	SR	Chris Burton
Owen Wright	SR	Andy Goodway
Hugh McGahan	LK/LF	Mick Adams
Clayton Friend	Int.	John Joyner
Riki Cowan	Int.	Kevin Beardmore
Graham Lowe	Coach	Frank Myler

25 July 1984

South Island	14 – 36	Great Britain Lions
Tries: Glen Gibb (2); Goals: Barry Edkins (3)	Report	Tries: Kevin Beardmore (3); John Basnett(2); Ellery Hanley; Keith Mumby; Goals: David Hobbs (4)

Addington Showgrounds, Christchurch
Attendance: 2,581
Referee: Tony Drake

South Island: Robin Alfeld, Marty Crequer, Boyd Kilkelly, Mike McDonald, Robert Moimoi, David Field, Glen Gibb, Wayne Dwyer, Wayne Wallace, Ross Taylor, Russell Tuuta, Scott Barrow, Barry Edkins. Reserves – Mark Forsey, Adrian Shelford. Coach – Ray Haffenden

Great Britain: Keith Mumby, Garry Clark, Ellery Hanley, John Joyner (c), John Basnett, Steve Donlan, Neil Holding, David Hobbs, Kevin Beardmore, Lee Crooks, Chris Burton, Mike O'Neill, Terry Flanagan. Reserves – Mick Burke, Mick Adams

=== Third Test ===
28 July 1984

New Zealand	32 – 16	Great Britain
Tries: Clayton Friend (2); James Leuluai (2); Dane O'Hara; Goals: Olsen Filipaina (6)		Tries: Ellery Hanley; Keith Mumby; Goals: Mick Burke (4)

Carlaw Park, Auckland
Attendance: 7,967
Referee: Kevin Roberts (Australia)
Player of the Match: Olsen Filipaina

New Zealand	Position	Great Britain
Gary Kemble	FB	Mick Burke
Dean Bell	WG	Joe Lydon
James Leuluai	CE	Ellery Hanley
Fred Ah Kuoi (c)	CE	Keith Mumby
Dane O'Hara	WG	Des Drummond
Olsen Filipaina	FE/SO	Tony Myler
Shane Varley	HB/SH	Andy Gregory
Kevin Tamati	PR	David Hobbs
Howie Tamati	HK	Brian Noble (c)
Dane Sorensen	PR	Brian Case
Kurt Sorensen	SR	Mick Adams
Owen Wright	SR	Andy Goodway
Hugh McGahan	LK/LF	Terry Flanagan
Clayton Friend	Int.	John Joyner
Riki Cowan	Int.	Steve Donlan
Graham Lowe	Coach	Frank Myler

31 July 1984

Auckland	18 – 16	Great Britain Lions
Tries: Shane Cooper (2); Cedric Lovett; Goals: Cedric Lovett (3)		Tries: Andy Goodway (2); Keith Mumby; Goals: David Hobbs (2)

Carlaw Park, Auckland
Attendance: 6,123
Referee: Ray Shrimpton

Auckland: Darrell Williams, Joe Ropati, Dean Bell, Ron O'Regan (c), Cedric Lovett, Shane Cooper, Clayton Friend, Riki Cowan, Lindsay Hooker, Kevin Tamati, John Ackland, Shane Howells, Owen Wright. Reserves – Fred Ah Kuoi. Coach – Bob Bailey

Great Britain: Mick Burke, Des Drummond, Ellery Hanley, Keith Mumby, John Basnett, Steve Donlan, Andy Gregory, Keith Rayne, Brian Noble (c), Andy Goodway, David Hobbs, Wayne Proctor, Terry Flanagan. Reserves – Mike Smith

== Papua New Guinea ==
=== Test ===
5 August 1984

Papua New Guinea	20 – 38	Great Britain
Tries: Robert Jakis; David Noifa; Arebo Taumaku; Bob Tolik; Goals: Bal Numapo (2)		Tries: Des Drummond (2); Mick Burke; Ellery Hanley; David Hobbs; Keith Mumby; Keith Rayne; Goals: Mick Burke (5)

Rebiamul Oval, Mount Hagen
Attendance: 7,510
Referee: Barry Gomersall (Australia)

Papua New Guinea	Position	Great Britain
Mathias Kitimun	FB	Mick Burke
N. Karai	WG	Des Drummond
David Noifa	CE	Ellery Hanley
Bal Numapo	CE	Keith Mumby
Bob Tolik	WG	Joe Lydon
Gessau Gebob	FE/SO	Tony Myler
Poka Kila	HB/SH	Andy Gregory
Joe Tep (c)	PR	Keith Rayne
F. Asorifa	HK	Brian Noble (c)
Robert Jakis	PR	Andy Goodway
Robert Kubak	SR	Terry Flanagan
Roy Loitive	SR	David Hobbs
Arebo Taumaku	LK/LF	Mick Adams
Jimmy Peter	Int.	Steve Donlan
Pora Wek	Int.	Wayne Proctor
??	Coach	Frank Myler

== Statistics ==
Leading try scorer

- 12 by Ellery Hanley

Leading point scorer

- 80 by Mick Burke (2 tries, 36 goals)

Largest attendance

- 30,190 – First test vs Australia at the Sydney Cricket Ground

Largest non-test attendance

- 10,000 – Newcastle Firsts vs Great Britain at Newcastle International Sports Centre
