= 1987–88 Rugby League Divisional Premiership =

1987–88 Divisional Premiership Trophy
- Structure: National knockout championship
- Teams: 8
- Winners: Oldham
- Runners-up: Featherstone Rovers

The 1987–88 Rugby League Divisional Premiership was the 2nd end-of-season Rugby League Divisional Premiership competition.

The competition was contested by the top eight teams in the second Division. The winners were Oldham.

== First round ==
Date	Team one	Score	Team two
24 April 1988	Featherstone Rovers	42–1	Mansfield Marksman
24 April 1988	Oldham	34–24	Keighley
24 April 1988	Springfield Borough	11–10	Sheffield Eagles
24 April 1988	Wakefield Trinity	44–23	York

== Semi-finals ==
Date	Team one	Score	Team two
8 May 1988	Featherstone Rovers	20–16	Wakefield Trinity
8 May 1988	Oldham	18–10	Springfield Borough

== Final ==
15 May 1988

Oldham	28 – 26	Featherstone Rovers
Tries: Foy (2), Flanagan, Walsh, Meadows; Goals: McAlister (4)		Tries: Steadman (2), Bannister, Sykes; Goals: Quinn (5)

Old Trafford, Manchester
Referee: Robin Whitfield (Widnes)
Player of the Match: Des Foy

1	Mick Burke
2	Paul Round
3	Des Foy
4	Charlie McAlister
5	Kevin Meadows
6	Peter Walsh
7	Mike Ford
8	Ian Sherratt
9	Ian Sanderson
10	Hugh Waddell
11	Colin Hawkyard
12	Mal Graham (c)
13	Terry Flanagan
Substitutes:
14	Richard Irving
15	Gary Warnecke
Coach:
Eric Fitzsimons

1	Steve Quinn
2	Andy Bannister
3	David Sykes
4	Alan Banks
5	Richard Marsh
6	Graham Steadman
7	Deryck Fox (c)
8	Gary Siddall
9	Keith Bell
10	Karl Harrison
11	Paul Hughes
12	Peter Smith
13	Paul Lyman
Substitutes:
14	John Crossley
15	John Bastian
Coach:
Peter Fox

== See also ==
- 1987–88 Rugby Football League season
