= 1982–83 Rugby League Premiership =

1982–83 Premiership
- Structure: National knockout championship
- Winners: Widnes
- Runners-up: Hull F.C.

The 1982–83 Rugby League Premiership was the ninth end of season Rugby League Premiership competition.

The winners were Widnes.

== First round ==
Date	Team one	Team two	Score
24 Apr	Hull F.C.	Oldham	24-21
24 Apr	Hull Kingston Rovers	Castleford	35-14
24 Apr	St Helens	Widnes	7-11
24 Apr	Wigan	Leeds	9-12

== Semi-finals ==
Date	Team one	Team two	Score
30 Apr	Hull Kingston Rovers	Widnes	10-21
01 May	Hull F.C.	Leeds	19-5

== Final ==
14 May 1983

Widnes	22-10	Hull F.C.
G-Lydon (5); T-Basnett (2), Myler, Gregory		G-Crooks(2); T-O'Hara, Topliss

Headingley Stadium
Attendance: 17,813
Referee: Fred Lindop
Player of the Match: Tony Myler

1	Mick Burke
2	Ralph Linton
3	Joe Lydon
4	Tony Myler
5	John Basnett
6	Eric Hughes
7	Andy Gregory
8	Mike O'Neill
9	Keith Elwell
10	Fred Whitfield
11	Les Gorley
12	Eric Prescott
13	Mick Adams
Substitutions:
14	David Hulme for Andy Gregory
15	Steve O'Neill for Fred Whitfield
Coach:
Harry Dawson & Colin Tyrer

1	Gary Kemble
2	Dane O'Hara
3	James Leuluai
4	Steve Evans
5	Paul Rose
6	David Topliss
7	Terry Day
8	Tony Dean
9	John "Keith" Bridges
10	Richard "Charlie" Stone
11	Trevor Skerrett
12	Lee Crooks
13	Steve Norton
Substitutions:
14	Patrick Solal for Terry Day
15	Mick Crane for Steve Norton
Coach:
Arthur Bunting
