= Alan Shepard (disambiguation) =

Alan Shepard (1923–1998) was the first American astronaut to travel into space.

Alan Shepard or Sheppard may also refer to:

- USNS Alan Shepard, a U.S. Navy dry cargo ship
- Alan Shepard (Halfway Home), a character on the television show Halfway Home
- Alan Shepard (academic), American-Canadian academic, president of Western University in London, Ontario, Canada
- Alan Sheppard (rugby league) (born 1957), Australian rugby league player

== See also ==
- Alan Shepherd (1935–2007), British motorcycle racer
- Alan Shepherd (cricketer), Australian cricketer
- Allan Shepard, American attorney and jurist
- Allen Sheppard, Baron Sheppard of Didgemere (1932–2015), British industrialist
