= 1981–82 Lancashire Cup =

- Structure: Regional knockout championship
- Teams: 16
- Winners: Leigh
- Runners-up: Widnes

The 1981–82 Lancashire Cup (known as the Forshaws Lancashire Cup for sponsorship reasons) was the 69th staging of the rugby league knockout competition, the Lancashire Cup.

Leigh won the trophy with an 8–3 win against Widnes.

== Background ==
This season saw the introduction of two new non-Lancashire clubs, Carlisle and Fulham, increasing the number of clubs in the competition from 14 to 16, meaning there was no longer a need for any teams to receive byes in the first round.

In his column for the Manchester Evening News, Warrington player Ken Kelly was especially critical of the addition of London-based Fulham, arguing it made a mockery of the competition.

== Competition and results ==
=== First round ===
The first round involved eight matches and 16 clubs. Carlisle's match against Wigan was the club's first ever competitive fixture.

| Game no. | Fixture date | Home team | Score | Away team | Venue | Att | Ref |
|---|---|---|---|---|---|---|---|
| 1 | 14 August 1981 | Oldham | 7–17 | Salford | Watersheddings | 2915 | |
| 2 | 16 August 1981 | Barrow | 15–7 | Warrington | Craven Park | 3197 | |
| 3 | 16 August 1981 | Blackpool Borough | 0–28 | St Helens | Borough Park | 2239 | |
| 4 | 16 August 1981 | Carlisle | 6–9 | Wigan | Brunton Park | 2779 | |
| 5 | 16 August 1981 | Fulham | 32–15 | Swinton | Craven Cottage | 3207 | |
| 6 | 16 August 1981 | Leigh | 37–2 | Whitehaven | Hilton Park | 3915 | |
| 7 | 16 August 1981 | Rochdale Hornets | 8–14 | Widnes | Athletic Grounds | 1054 | |
| 8 | 16 August 1981 | Workington Town | 35–2 | Huyton | Derwent Park | 1417 | |

=== Second round ===
The second round involved four matches and eight clubs.

| Game no. | Fixture date | Home team | Score | Away team | Venue | Att | Ref |
|---|---|---|---|---|---|---|---|
| 1 | 23 August 1981 | Leigh | 32–17 | Workington Town | Hilton Park | 4283 | |
| 2 | 23 August 1981 | St. Helens | 40–17 | Barrow | Knowsley Road | 4303 | |
| 3 | 23 August 1981 | Salford | 19–3 | Fulham | The Willows | 3462 | |
| 4 | 23 August 1981 | Wigan | 11–26 | Widnes | Central Park | 6711 | |

=== Semifinals ===
The semifinals involved two matches and four clubs.

| Game no. | Fixture date | Home team | Score | Away team | Venue | Att | Ref |
|---|---|---|---|---|---|---|---|
| 1 | 2 September 1981 | Leigh | 20–6 | St. Helens | Hilton Park | 8196 | |
| 2 | 2 September 1981 | Widnes | 33–2 | Salford | Naughton Park | 5849 | |

=== Final ===
The final was played at Central Park, Wigan. The attendance was 9,011 and receipts were £14,029. This was Leigh's first Lancashire Cup since the 1970–71 season.

| Game no. | Fixture date | Home team | Score | Away team | Venue | Att | Ref |
|---|---|---|---|---|---|---|---|
| | 26 September 1981 | Leigh | 8–3 | Widnes | Central Park | 9011 | |

==== Teams and scorers ====
| Leigh | No. | Widnes |
|---|---|---|
| Mick Hogan | 1 | Mick Burke |
| Des Drummond | 2 | Mick George |
| Terry Bilsbury | 3 | Eric Hughes |
| Steve Donlan | 4 | Eddie Cunningham |
| Graham Worgan | 5 | Keith Bentley |
| John Woods | 6 | Dave Moran |
| Ken Green | 7 | Andy Gregory |
| Alf Wilkinson | 8 | Mike O'Neill |
| Ray Tabern | 9 | Keith Elwell |
| Tony Cooke | 10 | Brian Lockwood |
| Thomas Martyn | 11 | Les Gorley |
| Geoffrey Clarkson | 12 | Eric Prescott |
| Mick McTigue | 13 | Mick Adams |
| ?? | 14 | |
| x Billy Platt (for Thomas Martyn) | 15 | |
| 8 | Score | 3 |
| 5 | HT | 0 |
| | Scorers | |
| | Tries | |
| Terry Bilsbury (1) | T | Keith Bentley (1) |
| | Goals | |
| John Woods (2) | G | |
| | Drop goals | |
| Steve Donlan (1) | DG | |
| Referee | | W H (Billy) Thompson (Huddersfield) |
| Man of the match | | Ray Tabern - Leigh - Hooker |
| Sponsored by | | Burtonwood Brewery |
| Competition sponsor | | Forshaws (Burtonwood Brewery Co Ltd) |

Scoring - Try = three points - Goal = two points - Drop goal = one point

=== The road to success ===
First round
Leigh | 37
Whitehaven | 2
Workington Town | 35
Huyton | 2
Blackpool Borough | 0
St. Helens | 28
Barrow | 15
Warrington | 7
Carlisle | 6
Wigan | 9
Rochdale Hornets | 8
Widnes | 14
Oldham | 7
Salford | 17
Fulham | 32
Swinton | 15

Second round
Leigh | 32
Workington Town | 17
St. Helens | 40
Barrow | 17
Wigan | 11
Widnes | 26
Salford | 19
Fulham | 3

Semi-finals
Leigh | 20
St. Helens | 6
Widnes | 33
Salford | 2

Final
Leigh | 8
Widnes | 3

== See also ==
- 1981–82 Rugby Football League season
- Rugby league county cups
