= 1980–81 Challenge Cup =

Rugby league competition

1980–81 Three Fives Challenge Cup
- Duration: 5 Rounds
- Number of teams: 32
- Winners: Widnes
- Runners-up: Hull Kingston Rovers
- Lance Todd Trophy: Mick Burke

The 1980–81 Challenge Cup was the 80th staging of rugby league's oldest knockout competition, the Challenge Cup. Known as the Three Fives Challenge Cup for sponsorship reasons, the final was contested by Widnes and Hull Kingston Rovers at Wembley, with Widnes winning 18–9.

== First round ==
Tie no	Home team	Score	Away team	Attendance
1	Hull Kingston Rovers	18–13	Barrow	8,220
2	Batley	7–15	Keighley	1,714
3	Blackpool Borough	2–11	Oldham	2,837
4	Bramley	5–18	Warrington	3,350
5	Castleford	42–7	Huyton	3,020
6	Dewsbury	15–10	Hunslet	1,777
7	Fulham	5–9	Wakefield Trinity	15,013
8	Halifax	3–2	Wigan	8,360
9	Huddersfield	8–10	St. Helens	3,094
10	Hull	14–5	Leeds	15,119
11	Leigh	20–6	Whitehaven	5,139
12	Pilkington Recs	7–18	York	
13	Salford	17–13	Bradford Northern	5,371
14	Swinton	8–10	Featherstone Rovers	2,987
15	Widnes	50–0	Doncaster	4,563
16	Workington Town	17–8	Rochdale Hornets	2,459

== Second round ==
Tie no	Home team	Score	Away team	Attendance
1	St. Helens	5–3	Hull	8,263
2	Featherstone Rovers	10–7	Keighley	3,126
3	Hull Kingston Rovers	23–7	York	13,764
4	Oldham	18–7	Workington Town	4,350
5	Salford	12–3	Leigh	8,759
6	Wakefield Trinity	18–8	Halifax	9,604
7	Widnes	7–5	Castleford	7,436
8	Dewsbury	10–18	Warrington	5,200

== Third round ==
Tie no	Home team	Score	Away team	Attendance
1	Warrington	13–9	Wakefield Trinity	7,587
2	Featherstone Rovers	5–21	Widnes	7,620
3	Hull Kingston Rovers	19–8	Salford	14,315
4	Oldham	5–6	St. Helens	8,712

== Semi final ==
28 March 1981

Warrington	9 – 17	Widnes
Try: Bevan; Goal: Hesford (3)	Report	Try: Burke, Cunningham, Wright; Goal: Burke (4)

Central Park, Wigan
Attendance: 12,624
Referee: John Holdsworth (Leeds)

4 April 1981

Hull Kingston Rovers	22 – 5	St. Helens
Try: Hogan, Hartley (2), Muscroft; Goal: Hubbard (5)	Report	Try: Pinner; Goal: Griffiths

Headingley, Leeds
Attendance: 17,073
Referee: Ron Campbell (Widnes)

== Final ==
Hull Kingston Rovers returned to Wembley as defending champions, having won the Challenge Cup for the first time in their history in the previous year. Widnes won the match 18–9, with Widnes full-back Mick Burke being awarded the Lance Todd Trophy.

2 May 1981

Widnes	18 – 9	Hull Kingston Rovers
Try: Burke, George, Gregory; Goal: Burke (4); Drop goal: Adams	Report	Try: Burton; Goal: Hubbard (3)

Wembley, London
Attendance: 92,496
Referee: Gerry Kershaw (Easingwold)
Player of the Match: Mick Burke

FB	1	Mick Burke
RW	2	Stuart Wright
RC	3	Mick George
LC	4	Eddie Cunningham
LW	5	Keith Bentley
SO	6	Eric Hughes
SH	7	Andy Gregory
PR	8	Mike O'Neill
HK	9	Keith Elwell
PR	10	Brian Lockwood
SR	11	Les Gorley
SR	12	Eric Prescott
LF	13	Mick Adams (c)
Substitutions:
IC	14	John Myler
IC	15	Glyn Shaw
Coach:
Doug Laughton

FB	1	David Hall
RW	2	Steve Hubbard
RC	3	Mike Smith
LC	4	Phil Hogan
LW	5	Peter Muscroft
SO	6	Steve Hartley
SH	7	Paul Harkin
PR	8	Roy Holdstock
HK	9	David Watkinson
PR	10	Steve Crooks
SR	11	Phil Lowe
SR	12	Chris Burton
LF	13	Len Casey (c)
Substitutions:
IC	14	Paul Proctor
IC	15	John Millington
Coach:
Roger Millward
