= David Sykes =

David Sykes may refer to:

- David Sykes (footballer) (1942–2023), Australian rules footballer
- David Sykes (rugby league), rugby league footballer of the 1980s
- David Sykes (programmer), co-founder of Revolution Software
- David John Sykes (1865–1941), farmer and political figure in Saskatchewan

== See also ==
- David Sikes, American politician
