= Neil Holding =

English RL coach and former GB & England international rugby league footballer

Personal information
- Born: 15 December 1960 (age 64); St Helens, Lancashire, England

Playing information
- Position: Stand-off, Scrum-half
Club
Years	Team	Pld	T	G	FG	P
1977–90	St Helens	343	145	84	44	739
1990–91	Rochdale Hornets	25	3	1	4	18
1991–92	Oldham	4	0	1	0	2
1993–94	Bradford Northern	8	2	1	0	10
	Total	380	150	87	48	769
Representative
Years	Team	Pld	T	G	FG	P
1979–83	Great Britain U24	4	2	0	1	7
1980	Lancashire	2	1	0	0	3
1980	England	1	0	0	0	0
1984	Great Britain	4	0	0	1	1

Coaching information
Club
Years	Team	Gms	W	D	L	W%
1991	Rochdale Hornets	11	1	0	10	9

Neil Holding (born 15 December 1960) is an English former professional rugby league footballer who played in the 1970s, 1980s and 1990s, and coached in the 1990s. He played at representative level for Great Britain, England and Lancashire, and at club level for St Helens, Oldham and Rochdale Hornets, as a stand-off or scrum-half, and coached at club level for Rochdale Hornets.

== Playing career ==
=== St Helens ===
Holding made his debut for St Helens in October 1977 against Swinton.

Holding played scrum-half in St Helens' 7–13 defeat by Widnes in the 1978 BBC2 Floodlit Trophy Final during the 1978–79 season at Knowsley Road, St Helens on Tuesday 12 December 1978.

Holding played scrum-half in St Helens 0–16 defeat by Warrington in the 1982 Lancashire Cup Final during the 1982–83 season at Central Park, Wigan on Saturday 23 October 1982, and played scrum-half in the 28–16 victory over Wigan in the 1984 Lancashire Cup Final during the 1984–85 season at Central Park, Wigan on Sunday 28 October 1984.

Holding played scrum-half in St Helens' 18–19 defeat by Halifax in the 1987 Challenge Cup Final during the 1986–87 season at Wembley Stadium, London on Saturday 2 May 1987.

Holding played scrum-half, and scored a drop goal in St Helens' 15–14 victory over Leeds in the 1987–88 John Player Special Trophy Final during the 1987–88 season at Central Park, Wigan on Saturday 9 January 1988.

=== Later career ===
In September 1990, Holding was signed by Rochdale Hornets for a fee of £50,000. In February 1991, he was appointed as player-coach at Rochdale. Following the club's relegation from the First Division at the end of the 1990–91 season, he was replaced as coach by Stan Gittins.

In August 1991, he was signed by Oldham in exchange for Brett Clark and Ronnie Duane.

=== International honours ===
Holding won one cap for England while at St Helens in 1980 against Wales, and won caps for Great Britain while at St Helens on the 1984 Lions tour against Australia (3 matches) and New Zealand.

== Post-playing career ==
After retiring from rugby league, Holding worked as a groundsman at St Helens. In 1998, he left the club to take up a similar role at Liverpool football club. He worked at Liverpool until 2014, when he left the club to set up his own gardening business.

Neil Holding is a St Helens R.F.C. Hall of Fame inductee.
