= Paul Round (rugby league) =

English rugby league footballer

Personal information
- Full name: Paul Round
- Born: 24 September 1963 (age 62) St Helens, England

Playing information
- Position: Prop, Second-row
Club
Years	Team	Pld	T	G	FG	P
1982–87	St Helens	121	42	0	0	168
1987–91	Oldham	111	49	0	0	196
1991–93	Wakefield Trinity	59	9	0	0	36
1993–94	Halifax	18	7	0	0	28
1994–95	Bradford Northern	2	1	0	0	4
1996	Castleford	3	0	0	0	0
1997–99	Oldham	40	7	0	0	28
	Total	354	115	0	0	460
Representative
Years	Team	Pld	T	G	FG	P
1984	Great Britain U21	2	0	0	0	0
1987	Lancashire	2	1	0	0	4

Paul Round (born 24 September 1963) is a former professional rugby league footballer who played in the 1980s and 1990s. He played at club level for St Helens, Oldham, Wakefield Trinity, Halifax, Bradford Northern and Castleford, as a prop, or second-row.

== Background ==
Paul Round was born in St Helens, Lancashire, England.

== Playing career ==
=== St Helens ===
Round started his professional career with St Helens, making his debut during the 1982–83 season.

Round played second-row in St Helens 28–16 victory over Wigan in the 1984 Lancashire Cup Final during the 1984–85 season at Central Park, Wigan on Sunday 28 October 1984.

Round appeared as a substitute, and scored a try in St Helens' 18–19 defeat by Halifax in the 1987 Challenge Cup Final during the 1986–87 season at Wembley Stadium, London on Saturday 2 May 1987.

=== Oldham ===
Round was signed by Oldham in August 1987. The transfer fee of £65,000 was set by an independent tribunal.

Round won the Divisional Premiership twice with the club, in 1987–88 and 1989–90.

In October 1991, Round and Oldham teammate Paul Lord were sold to Wakefield Trinity in exchange for Ged Byrne.
