= 1983–84 Challenge Cup =

Rugby league competition

1983–84 State Express Challenge Cup
- Duration: 6 Rounds
- Number of teams: 34
- Winners: Widnes
- Runners-up: Wigan
- Lance Todd Trophy: Joe Lydon

The 1983–84 Challenge Cup was the 83rd staging of rugby league's oldest knockout competition, the Challenge Cup. Known as the State Express Challenge Cup due to sponsorship by State Express 555, the final was contested by Widnes and Wigan at Wembley. Widnes won the match 19–6.

== Preliminary round ==
Tie no	Home team	Score	Away team	Attendance
1	Fulham	14–4	Swinton	1,680
2	Carlisle	12–20	Widnes	1,271

== First round ==
Tie no	Home team	Score	Away team	Attendance
1	Kent Invicta	20–42	Castleford	1,643
2	Barrow	12–14	Workington Town	5,132
3	Blackpool Borough	10–27	Hull Kingston Rovers	2,758
4	Bradford Northern	20–4	Featherstone Rovers	7,542
5	Bramley	10–10	Wigan	3,968
Replay	Wigan	34–4	Bramley	5,815
6	Cardiff City	6–34	Hull	2,735
7	Doncaster	11–8	Batley	634
8	Halifax	7–19	Wakefield Trinity	4,402
9	Hunslet	21–10	Keighley	1,466
10	Oldham	28–10	Huyton	2,552
11	Rochdale Hornets	8–17	York	756
12	St. Helens	16–10	Leigh	6,556
13	Salford	16–24	Leeds	4,299
14	Warrington	34–16	Huddersfield	3,064
15	Whitehaven	10–17	Fulham	1,683
16	Widnes	54–10	Dewsbury	4,005

== Second round ==
Tie no	Home team	Score	Away team	Attendance
1	St. Helens	24–14	Hull	5,815
2	Castleford	23–16	Warrington	8,029
3	Fulham	10–12	Widnes	3,591
4	Hull Kingston Rovers	40–7	Doncaster	6,959
5	Hunslet	7–17	Bradford Northern	6,956
6	Wakefield Trinity	12–20	York	3,222
7	Wigan	30–6	Oldham	9,515
8	Workington Town	3–12	Leeds	4,110

== Third round ==
Tie no	Home team	Score	Away team	Attendance
1	Widnes	21–10	Hull Kingston Rovers	8,017
2	Leeds	13–13	Bradford Northern	17,494
Replay	Bradford Northern	10–12	Leeds	18,424
3	St. Helens	7–16	Wigan	20,007
4	York	14–12	Castleford	8,529

== Semi finals ==
24 March 1984

Wigan	14 – 8	York
Try: Scott, Whitfield; Goal: Whitfield (3)	Report	Try: Harrison; Goal: Steadman (2)

Elland Road, Leeds
Attendance: 17,156
Referee: Ron Campbell (Widnes)

31 March 1984

Widnes	15 – 4	Leeds
Try: Burke, Lydon; Goal: Burke (3); Drop goal: S. O'Neill	Report	Try: Martin

Station Road, Swinton
Attendance: 14,046

== Final ==
Widnes were appearing at Wembley for the seventh time in the last ten years, while Wigan were making their first appearance in the final since 1970. Widnes were the winners of a fairly one-sided encounter by a score of 19–6, with Joe Lydon winning the Lance Todd Trophy.

5 May 1984

Widnes	19 – 6	Wigan
Try: Lydon (2), O'Loughlin; Goal: Burke (3); Drop goal: S. O'Neill	Report	Try: Hemsley; Goal: Whitfield

Wembley, London
Attendance: 80,116
Referee: Billy Thompson (Huddersfield)
Player of the Match: Joe Lydon

FB	1	Mick Burke
RW	2	Stuart Wright
RC	3	Eric Hughes (c)
LC	4	Joe Lydon
LW	5	John Basnett
SO	6	Keiron O'Loughlin
SH	7	Andy Gregory
PR	8	Steve O'Neill
HK	9	Keith Elwell
PR	10	Kevin Tamati
SR	11	Les Gorley
SR	12	Mike O'Neill
LF	13	Mick Adams
Substitutions:
IC	14	David Hulme
IC	15	Fred Whitfield
Coach:
Vince Karalius

FB	1	Shaun Edwards
RW	2	Dennis Ramsdale
RC	3	David Stephenson
LC	4	Colin Whitfield
LW	5	Henderson Gill
SO	6	Mark Cannon
SH	7	Gary Stephens
PR	8	Kerry Hemsley
HK	9	Howie Tamati
PR	10	Brian Case
SR	11	Graeme West (c)
SR	12	Mick Scott
LF	13	John Pendlebury
Substitutions:
IC	14	Wayne Elvin
IC	15	Brian Juliff
Coach:
Alex Murphy
