= Steve Donlan =

Former GB & England rugby league footballer

Personal information
- Full name: Stephen Michael Donlan
- Born: 4 September 1954 (age 70); Leigh, England

Playing information
- Position: Centre
Club
Years	Team	Pld	T	G	FG	P
1978–85	Leigh	240	81	21	28	337
1985	Wigan	27	7	0	0	28
1985–87	Bradford Northern	69	17	0	0	68
1987–≥88	Springfield Borough
	Total	336	105	21	28	433
Representative
Years	Team	Pld	T	G	FG	P
1981–82	Lancashire	2	3	0	0	9
1984	England	1	0	0	0	0
1984	Great Britain	2	0	0	0	0

Stephen Michael Donlan (born 4 September 1954) is an English former professional rugby league footballer who played in the 1970s and 1980s. He played at representative level for Great Britain and England, and at club level for Leigh, Wigan, Bradford Northern and Springfield Borough, as a goal-kicking centre.

== Background ==
Steve Donlan was born in Leigh, Lancashire, England, and attended Leigh Boys Grammar School. After leaving school, he joined a local accounting firm in 1972, eventually becoming Managing Director of the practice.

He is the father of the rugby league footballer, and coach; Stuart Donlan.

== Playing career ==
=== Leigh ===
Donlan was signed by Leigh in 1978 from the town's rugby union club.

Donlan played centre, and scored a drop goal in Leigh's 8-3 victory over Widnes in the 1981 Lancashire Cup Final during the 1981–82 season at Central Park, Wigan on Saturday 26 September 1981.

Donlan played in Leigh's victory in the Championship during the 1981–82 season.

=== Wigan ===
In January 1985, Donlan was signed by Wigan for a fee of £28,000.

Donlan played centre, in Wigan's 28-24 victory over Hull F.C. in the 1985 Challenge Cup Final during the 1984–85 season at Wembley Stadium, London on Saturday 4 May 1985.

Later that year, Donlan was sold to Bradford Northern as part of Wigan's signing of Ellery Hanley.

=== International honours ===
Steve Donlan won a cap for England while at Leigh in 1984 against Wales. He also won two caps for Great Britain on the 1984 Lions tour while at Leigh against New Zealand (sub), and Papua New Guinea (sub).
