= Gary Warnecke =

Australian rugby league footballer

Personal information
- Full name: Gary Warnecke
- Born: 18 February 1957 (age 68); Sydney, New South Wales, Australia

Playing information
- Position: Lock, Five-eighth
Club
Years	Team	Pld	T	G	FG	P
1979–84	Eastern Suburbs	59	11	0	0	33
1985	Western Suburbs	13	1	0	1	5
1985–88	Oldham	87	34	0	0	136
	Total	159	46	0	1	174

Gary Warnecke (born 18 February 1957) is a former Australian professional rugby league footballer who played for Eastern Suburbs and Western Suburbs in the NSWRL competition in the 1970s and 1980s.

== Playing career ==
Warnecke made his first grade debut for Eastern Suburbs against Penrith in Round 20 1979 at Penrith Park. The following year, Warnecke became a regular in the Easts side making 16 appearances. Easts would go on to reach the 1980 NSWRL grand final against Canterbury-Bankstown with Warnecke playing at lock. Canterbury went into halftime leading 7–4. In the second half, Canterbury player Greg Brentnall put up a bomb and Canterbury winger Steve Gearin jumped over the top of Easts player David Michael and caught the ball scoring a try in the process. Easts never recovered from the try and lost the grand final 18–4. The victory was Canterbury's first premiership in 38 years.

In 2013, Warnecke spoke of the grand final defeat saying "They keep showing that bloody Steve Gearin try, So it stays in your system and you keep getting reminded about it, it never leaves you, The thing I remember most about that game was it wasn’t one of our best games. It was unfortunate to get to the Grand Final and play so badly. But it’s all done on the day and whoever stands up on the day takes the victory".

In 1981, Eastern Suburbs finished as minor premiers but crashed out of the finals series losing at the preliminary final stage. Warnecke played in the preliminary final defeat against Newtown. The following year, Eastern Suburbs again reached the finals but were defeated by reigning premiers Parramatta in the preliminary final 33–0.

Warnecke played with Easts until the end of the 1984 season where the club finished second last on the table before leaving the club to join Western Suburbs. Warnecke played 13 games in his one season at Wests as the club finished towards the bottom of the ladder.

Warnecke moved to England following the conclusion of the 1985 season and joined Oldham. He spent three seasons with the club, helping the team reach the final of the 1986–87 Lancashire Cup, and winning the 1987–88 Second Division Premiership.
