= Tony Myler =

GB international rugby league footballer and coach

Personal information
- Full name: Anthony Myler
- Born: 26 September 1960 (age 65)

Playing information
- Position: Stand-off
Club
Years	Team	Pld	T	G	FG	P
1979–92	Widnes	238+20	89	0	0	327
1986	Balmain Tigers	13	1	0	0	4
	Total	271	90	0	0	331
Representative
Years	Team	Pld	T	G	FG	P
1983–86	Great Britain	14	1	0	0	4
1982–85	Lancashire	2	1	0	0	3
1984	GB tour games	4+1	0	0	0	0

Coaching information
Club
Years	Team	Gms	W	D	L	W%
1994–95	Widnes
- Relatives: Stephen Myler (nephew)

Anthony Myler (born 26 September 1960) is an English former professional rugby league footballer who played in the 1980s and 1990s who also became a coach. A Great Britain international representative stand-off, he played club football in England for Widnes, with whom he won the Premiership during the 1982–83 season, as well as a stint in Australia with the Balmain Tigers. Tony Myler is the brother of the rugby league footballer John Myler and the uncle of Stephen Myler

== Playing ==
Myler played for Widnes RUFC Colts before embarking on a professional career with the Widnes rugby league club in 1978. During the 1980 New Zealand rugby league tour of Great Britain and France, he played in the halves in Widnes victory over the Kiwis. During the 1981–82 season Myler appeared as a substitute (replacing Fullback Mick Burke on 59-minutes) in Widnes 14–14 draw with Hull F.C. in the 1982 Challenge Cup Final at Wembley Stadium, London on Saturday 1 May 1982, in front of a crowd of 92,147. Myler was then an unused Substitute in the 9–18 defeat by Hull F.C. in the 1982 Challenge Cup Final replay at Elland Road, Leeds on Wednesday 19 May 1982, in front of a crowd of 41,171.

Australia played a match against Widnes during the 1982 Kangaroo tour of Great Britain and France and Myler played at loose forward. In 1983 he was awarded the Harry Sunderland Trophy for man-of-the-match in that year's Premiership Final. During the 1983–84 season Myler played stand-off half in Widnes' loss against Barrow in the 1983 Lancashire Cup Final at Central Park, Wigan on Saturday 1 October 1983.

Myler was selected to go on the 1984 Great Britain Lions tour, playing at stand-off half in Test matches against both Australia and New Zealand. In 1986 Myler agreed to join Australian club, the Balmain Tigers during the English off-season as his Great Britain test teammate Garry Schofield had done. During the 1986 Kangaroo tour of Great Britain and France, Myler played for Great Britain at stand-off half in all three Ashes tests.

Myler played at Stand-off in Widnes' 6–12 loss against Wigan in the 1988–89 John Player Special Trophy Final during the 1988–89 season at Burnden Park, Bolton on Saturday 7 January 1989. During the 1989–90 Rugby Football League season, he played for defending champions Widnes at stand-off half in their 1989 World Club Challenge victory against the visiting Canberra Raiders. Myler's Testimonial match at Widnes also took place in 1989. During the 1990–91 season Myler captained Widnes at stand-off half and scored a try in the 24–18 victory over Salford in the 1990 Lancashire Cup Final at Central Park, Wigan on Saturday 29 September 1990.

== Coaching ==
Following his retirement from playing, Myler became coach of Widnes in May 1994. In August 1995 the club decided to bring back Doug Laughton for a third stint as team manager which resulted in Myler's sacking as coach.

Myler was also on the coaching staff at St. Helens and Warrington Wolves in the early years of Super League.
