= 1986–87 Lancashire Cup =

Rugby-league championship in north-west England

- Structure: Regional knockout championship
- Teams: 16
- Winners: Wigan
- Runners-up: Oldham

The 1986–87 Lancashire Cup, known as the Grunhalle Lager Lancashire Cup for sponsorship reasons, was the 74th occasion on which the Lancashire Cup competition had been held.

Wigan won the trophy by beating Oldham by the score of 27-6. The match was played at Knowsley Road, Eccleston, St Helens, Merseyside, (historically in the county of Lancashire). The attendance was 20,180 and receipts were £60,329.

This was Wigan’s third appearance in three years and a second victory in what would a run of four victories and five appearances in five successive years.

== Background ==
This season the total number of entrants remained at the 16 level.
With this full sixteen members there was no need for “blank” or “dummy” fixtures or any byes.

== Competition and results ==
=== Round 1 ===
Involved 8 matches (with no byes) and 16 clubs

| Game No | Fixture Date | Home team | Score | Away team | Venue | Att | Rec | Notes | Ref |
|---|---|---|---|---|---|---|---|---|---|
| 1 | Sun 14 Sep 1986 | Blackpool Borough | 6-30 | Barrow | Borough Park | 1112 | | | |
| 2 | Sun 14 Sep 1986 | Oldham | 29-22 | Leigh | Watersheddings | 4566 | | | |
| 3 | Sun 14 Sep 1986 | Runcorn Highfield | 10-48 | Widnes | Canal Street | 2338 | | | |
| 4 | Sun 14 Sep 1986 | St. Helens | 112-0 | Carlisle | Knowsley Road | 4068 | | 1 | |
| 5 | Sun 14 Sep 1986 | Warrington | 28-20 | Salford | Wilderspool | 3617 | | | |
| 6 | Sun 14 Sep 1986 | Whitehaven | 72-6 | Fulham | Recreation Ground | 1602 | | | |
| 7 | Sun 14 Sep 1986 | Wigan | 52-0 | Rochdale Hornets | Central Park | 10230 | | | |
| 8 | Sun 14 Sep 1986 | Workington Town | 25-16 | Swinton | Derwent Park | 710 | | | |

=== Round 2 - Quarter-finals ===
Involved 4 matches and 8 clubs

| Game No | Fixture Date | Home team | Score | Away team | Venue | Att | Rec | Notes | Ref |
|---|---|---|---|---|---|---|---|---|---|
| 1 | Wed 24 Sep 1986 | Barrow | 10-12 | Widnes | Craven Park | 3315 | | | |
| 2 | Wed 24 Sep 1986 | Oldham | 46-13 | Workington Town | Watersheddings | 3412 | | | |
| 3 | Wed 24 Sep 1986 | St. Helens | 19-15 | Warrington | Knowsley Road | 9750 | | | |
| 4 | Wed 24 Sep 1986 | Wigan | 74-6 | Whitehaven | Central Park | 9099 | | | |

=== Round 3 – Semi-finals ===
Involved 2 matches and 4 clubs

| Game No | Fixture Date | Home team | Score | Away team | Venue | Att | Rec | Notes | Ref |
|---|---|---|---|---|---|---|---|---|---|
| 1 | Wed 01 Oct 1986 | Oldham | 16-14 | Widnes | Watersheddings | 5601 | | | |
| 2 | Wed 01 Oct 1986 | Wigan | 22-16 | St. Helens | Central Park | 28252 | | | |

=== Final ===
| Game No | Fixture Date | Home team | Score | Away team | Venue | Att | Rec | Notes | Ref |
|---|---|---|---|---|---|---|---|---|---|
| | Sunday 19 October 1986 | Wigan | 27-6 | Oldham | Knowsley Road | 19202 | 56030 | 2 | |

==== Teams and scorers ====
| Wigan | № | Oldham |
|---|---|---|
| | Teams | |
| Shaun Edwards | 1 | Hussein M'Barki |
| Joe Lydon | 2 | Paul Sherman |
| David Stephenson | 3 | Gary Bridge |
| Dean Bell | 4 | Gary Warnecke |
| Henderson Gill | 5 | Michael Taylor |
| Ellery Hanley | 6 | David Topliss |
| Mike Ford | 7 | Paddy Kirwan |
| Graeme West | 8 | Bruce Clark |
| Martin Dermott | 9 | Terry Flanagan |
| Brian Case | 10 | David Hobbs |
| Ian Roberts | 11 | Tom Naidole |
| Ian Potter | 12 | Mick Worrall |
| Andy Goodway | 13 | Stuart Raper |
| | Subs | |
| Steve Hampson | 14 | Neil Clawson |
| Rob Louw (for Ian Roberts 67min) | 15 | Colin Hawkyard (for Stuart Raper Half-time) |
| Graham Lowe | Coach | Frank Myler |
| 27 | score | 6 |
| 8 | HT | 6 |
| | Scorers | |
| | Tries | |
| Shaun Edwards (2) | T | Gary Bridge (1) |
| Mike Ford (1) | T | |
| Joe Lydon (1) | T | |
| | Goals | |
| Henderson Gill (5) | G | David Hobbs (1) |
| | Drop Goals | |
| Joe Lydon (1) | DG | |
| Referee | | J E (Jim) Smith (Halifax) |
| Man of the match | | Mike Ford - Wigan - scrum-half |
| sponsored by | | Greenall Whitley |
| Competition Sponsor | | Grünhalle Lager |

Scoring - Try = four points - Goal = two points - Drop goal = one point

=== The road to success ===
First round
Wigan | 52
Rochdale Hornets | 0
Whitehaven | 72
Fulham | 6
St. Helens | 112
Carlisle | 0
Warrington | 28
Salford | 20
Oldham | 29
Leigh | 22
Workington Town | 25
Swinton | 16
Blackpool Borough | 6
Barrow | 30
Runcorn Highfield | 10
Widnes | 48

Second round
Wigan | 74
Whitehaven | 6
St. Helens | 19
Warrington | 15
Oldham | 16
Workington Town | 13
Barrow | 10
Widnes | 12

Semi-finals
Wigan | 22
St. Helens | 16
Oldham | 16
Widnes | 14

Final
Wigan | 27
Oldham | 6

== Notes and comments ==
1 * A record score for a match in this competition and a record defeat for Carlisle in any competition
2 * Knowsley Road was the home ground of St. Helens from 1890 to 2010. The final capacity was in the region of 18,000, although the actual record attendance was 35,695, set on 26 December 1949, for a league game between St Helens and Wigan

== See also ==
- 1986–87 Rugby Football League season
- Rugby league county cups
