= 1983–84 John Player Special Trophy =

- Structure: National knockout championship
- Teams: 18
- Winners: Leeds
- Runners-up: Widnes

This was the thirteenth season of the rugby league League Cup, which was this season known as the John Player Special Trophy for sponsorship reasons.

Leeds won the trophy, beating Widnes by the score of 18-10 in the final. The match was played at Central Park, Wigan and the attendance was 9,510. The gate receipts were £19824.

== Background ==
This season saw one change in the entrants, Kent Invicta joined the league and also the competition, the number of entrants now rising to thirty-four
The preliminary round now increased to two matches and involved four clubs, to reduce the numbers of entrants to the first round proper to thirty-two
Unfortunately, early in the season Bramley went into administration, and although they survived, during this period of administration they withdrew from this competition, leaving Hull Kingston Rovers with a bye in the first round.

== Competition and results ==
=== Preliminary round ===
Involved 2 matches and 4 Clubs

Game No	Fixture Date	Home team	Score	Away team	Venue	Att	Rec	Notes	Ref
1	Sun 23 Oct 1983	Batley	11-12	Doncaster	Mount Pleasant	782			
2	Sun 23 Oct 1983	Whitehaven	0-36	Widnes	Recreation Ground	1655			

=== Round 1 - First Round ===
Involved 15 matches with one bye and 31 Clubs

Game No	Fixture Date	Home team	Score	Away team	Venue	Att	Rec	Notes	Ref
1	Sat 5 11 1983	Castleford	P	Hull F.C.				1	
2	Sun 6 Nov 1983	Blackpool Borough	9-12	Leeds	Borough Park	1351			
3	Sun 6 Nov 1983	Cardiff City	41-6	Rochdale Hornets	Ninian Park	645			
4	Sun 6 Nov 1983	Carlisle	10-5	Workington Town	Brunton Park	1297			
5	Sun 6 Nov 1983	Dewsbury	14-17	Keighley	Crown Flatt	814			
6	Sun 6 Nov 1983	Featherstone Rovers	12-10	Fulham	Post Office Road	2011			
7	Sun 6 Nov 1983	Halifax	12-29	Barrow	Thrum Hall	2699			
8	Sun 6 Nov 1983	Kent Invicta	7-40	St. Helens	Athletic Ground, Maidstone	2107		2	
9	Sun 6 Nov 1983	Oldham	12-20	Leigh	Watersheddings	6264			
10	Sun 6 Nov 1983	Swinton	17-16	Hunslet	Station Road	1243			
11	Sun 6 Nov 1983	Wakefield Trinity	18-32	Warrington	Belle Vue	2935			
12	Sun 6 Nov 1983	Widnes	2-1	Bradford Northern	Naughton Park	5640		3	
13	Sun 6 Nov 1983	Wigan	30-13	York	Central Park	6388			
14	Sun 6 Nov 1983	Doncaster	11-22	Salford	Bentley Road Stadium/Tattersfield	458			
15	Sun 6 Nov 1983	Huddersfield	8-21	Huyton	Fartown	582			
16		Hull Kingston Rovers		bye				4	

=== Round 1 - First Round Replays ===
Involved 1 match and 2 Clubs

Game No	Fixture Date	Home team	Score	Away team	Venue	Att	Rec	Notes	Ref
1	Sun 6 Nov 1983	Castleford	4-8	Hull F.C.	Wheldon Road	7979			

=== Round 2 - Second Round ===
Involved 8 matches and 16 Clubs

Game No	Fixture Date	Home team	Score	Away team	Venue	Att	Rec	Notes	Ref
1	Sat 19 Nov 1983	Warrington	10-18	St. Helens	Wilderspool	4171			
2	Sun 20 Nov 1983	Cardiff City	38-12	Huyton	Ninian Park	1085			
3	Sun 20 Nov 1983	Carlisle	17-68	Leigh	Brunton Park	2152		5	
4	Sun 20 Nov 1983	Featherstone Rovers	20-14	Hull F.C.	Post Office Road	7833			
5	Sun 20 Nov 1983	Keighley	8-23	Swinton	Lawkholme Lane	1577			
6	Sun 20 Nov 1983	Leeds	12-6	Hull Kingston Rovers	Headingley	8623		6	
7	Sun 20 Nov 1983	Widnes	18-6	Barrow	Naughton Park	7030			
8	Sun 20 Nov 1983	Wigan	24-15	Salford	Central Park	7290			

=== Round 3 -Quarter Finals ===
Involved 4 matches with 8 clubs

Game No	Fixture Date	Home team	Score	Away team	Venue	Att	Rec	Notes	Ref
1	Sat 26 Nov 1983	Widnes	20-15	Wigan	Naughton Park	6492			
2	Sun 27 Nov 1983	Leigh	12-8	Cardiff City	Hilton Park	4134			
3	Sun 27 Nov 1983	St. Helens	16-12	Featherstone Rovers	Knowsley Road	5196			
4	Sun 27 Nov 1983	Swinton	12-16	Leeds	Station Road	3438			

=== Round 4 – Semi-Finals ===
Involved 2 matches and 4 Clubs

Game No	Fixture Date	Home team	Score	Away team	Venue	Att	Rec	Notes	Ref
1	Sat 10 Dec 1983	Leigh	11-18	Leeds	Fartown	5740			
2	Sat 17 Dec 1983	Widnes	18-4	St. Helens	Wilderspool	5729			

=== Final ===
Game No	Fixture Date	Home team	Score	Away team	Venue	Att	Rec	Notes	Ref
	Saturday 14 January 1984	Leeds	18-10	Widnes	Central Park	9510	19824	7	

==== Teams and scorers ====
Leeds	№	Widnes
	teams	
Ian Wilkinson	1	Mick Burke
Paul Prendiville	2	Stuart Wright
David Creasser	3	Keiron O'Loughlin
Dean Bell	4	Joe Lydon
Andy Smith	5	Ralph Linton
John Holmes	6	Eric Hughes
Kevin Dick	7	Andy Gregory
Keith Rayne	8	Mike O'Neill
David Ward	9	Keith Elwell
Kevin Rayne	10	Kevin Tamati
Gary Moorby	11	Les Gorley
Mark Laurie	12	Fred Whitfield
Terry Webb	13	Mick Adams
? Not used	14	? Not used
Kevin Squire (for David Ward)	15	? Not used
Maurice Bamford	Coach	Vince Karalius & Harry Dawson
18	score	10
14	HT	10
	Scorers	
	Tries	
John Holmes (1)	T	Joe Lydon (1)
Kevin Dick (1)	T	Ralph Linton (1)
	Goals	
David Creasser (5)	G	Mick Burke (1)
Referee		William "Billy" H. Thompson (Huddersfield)
Man of the match		Mark Laurie - Leeds - Second-row
Competition Sponsor		John Player Special

Scoring - Try = four points - Goal = two points - Drop goal = one point

=== Prize money ===
As part of the sponsorship deal and funds, the prize money awarded to the competing teams for this season is as follows :-

Finish Position	Cash prize	No. receiving prize	Total cash
Winner	?	1	?
Runner-up	?	1	?
semi-finalist	?	2	?
loser in Rd 3	?	4	?
loser in Rd 2	?	8	?
Loser in Rd 1	?	16	?
Loser in Prelim Round	?	?	?
Grand Total			

Note - the author is unable to trace the award amounts for this season. Can anyone help ?

=== The road to success ===
This tree excludes any preliminary round fixtures

First round
Carlisle	10
Workington Town	5
Oldham	12
Leigh	20
Cardiff City	41
Rochdale Hornets	6
Huddersfield	8
Huyton	21
Dewsbury	14
Keighley	17
Swinton	17
Hunslet	16
Blackpool Borough	9
Leeds	12
Hull Kingston Rovers
bye
Widnes	2
Bradford Northern	1
Halifax	12
Barrow	29
Wigan	30
York	13
Doncaster	11
Salford	22
Wakefield Trinity	18
Warrington	32
Kent Invicta	7
St. Helens	40
Featherstone Rovers	12
Fulham	10
Castleford	4
Hull F.C.	8

Second round
Carlisle	17
Leigh	68
Cardiff City	38
Huyton	12
Keighley	8
Swinton	23
Leeds	12
Hull Kingston Rovers	6
Widnes	18
Barrow	6
Wigan	24
Salford	15
Warrington	10
St. Helens	18
Featherstone Rovers	20
Hull F.C.	14

Third round
Leigh	12
Cardiff City	8
Swinton	12
Leeds	16
Widnes	20
Wigan	15
St. Helens	16
Featherstone Rovers	12

Semifinals
Leigh	11
Leeds	18
Widnes	18
St. Helens	4

Final
Leeds	18
Widnes	10

== Notes and comments ==
1 * This match had been chosen for Saturday BBC coverage but was cancelled and moved to Sunday at two days notice due to Industrial Action at the BBC
2 * Kent Invicta's record crowd
3 * 3 dropped goals
4 * Bramley withdrew from this competition while in liquidation
5 * highest score (and highest away score) o date between two professional clubs
6 * Wigan official archives state the home team are Leigh, an obvious printing error as earlier in the same fixture list Leigh are away at CarlisleCarlisle
7 * Central Park was the home ground of Wigan with a final capacity of 18,000, although the record attendance was 47,747 for Wigan v St Helens 27 March 1959

== See also ==
- 1983–84 Rugby Football League season
- 1983 Lancashire Cup
- 1983 Yorkshire Cup
- John Player Special Trophy
- Rugby league county cups
