= Terry Flanagan (rugby league) =

English RL coach and former GB international rugby league footballer

Terry Flanagan MBE
Personal information
- Full name: Terrence Flanagan
- Born: 27 November 1960 (age 65) Oldham, England

Playing information
- Position: Loose forward
Club
Years	Team	Pld	T	G	FG	P
1979–89	Oldham	281	42	1	2	147
	Swinton
	Total	281	42	1	2	147
Representative
Years	Team	Pld	T	G	FG	P
	Lancashire	2
1983–84	Great Britain	4	0	0	0	0

Coaching information
Representative
Years	Team	Gms	W	D	L	W%
1995–96	Ireland	0	0	0	0
- Relatives: Mark Flanagan (son); Kevin Flanagan (brother)

Terrence Flanagan MBE (born 27 November 1960) is an English former professional rugby league footballer who played in the 1970s and 1980s, usually as a loose forward. He played at representative level for Great Britain and Lancashire, and at club level for Oldham. He is the Chairman of Oldham RLFC.

== Early life ==
Born in Oldham, Flanagan attended St Anselm’s school in Werneth. He played junior rugby league for Saddleworth Rangers.

== Rugby league career ==
=== Oldham ===
Flanagan turned professional in 1979, signing for hometown club, Oldham. He helped the team win promotion to the First Division, and became the club's youngest-ever captain, aged 19.

Oldham were relegated back to the Second Division in 1980–81, but Flanagan led the team to promotion again in 1981–82, with the team going on a 21 game unbeaten run and losing only twice on their way to winning the Second Division championship.

He played hooker in Oldham's 6–27 defeat by Wigan in the 1986–87 Lancashire Cup Final during the 1986–87 season at Knowsley Road, St Helens on Sunday 19 October 1986. In the following season, he helped Oldham win the 1987–88 Divisional Premiership, scoring a try in the 28–26 win against Featherstone Rovers.

Flanagan's Testimonial match at Oldham took place in 1989. In 2005, he was inducted into Oldham's Hall of Fame.

=== Swinton ===
In January 1990, Flanagan was transferred to Swinton in exchange for winger, Derek Bate. He retired from the sport at the age of 30 due to a neck injury.

=== International honours ===
Flanagan won four caps for Great Britain. He played in two matches against France in 1983, and against New Zealand and Papua New Guinea on the 1984 Great Britain Lions tour.

=== Coaching ===
In 1995, Flanagan volunteered to coach the inaugural Ireland rugby league team, and coached the team during the 1995 Emerging Nations tournament.

== Charity work ==
In 2014, Flanagan received the Mike Gregory Spirit of Rugby League award in recognition of his charity work.

He was appointed Member of the Order of the British Empire (MBE) in the 2017 Birthday Honours for services to rugby league and to charity in the North West.

== Personal life ==
Terry Flanagan is the son of the rugby league footballer who played in the 1940s and 1950s for Oldham, Broughton Rangers/Belle Vue Rangers and Castleford; Bill Flanagan , the younger brother of rugby league footballer who played in the 1960s and 1970s for Oldham; Kevin Flanagan, and the father of the rugby league footballer; Mark Flanagan.
