= John Basnett =

GB international rugby league footballer

Personal information
- Full name: John Basnett
- Born: 3 January 1957 (age 68); Wallasey, England

Playing information

Rugby union
- Position: Wing
Club
Years	Team	Pld	T	G	FG	P
	New Brighton F.C.
	Winnington Park
	Total	0	0	0	0	0

Rugby league
- Position: Wing
Club
Years	Team	Pld	T	G	FG	P
1981–87	Widnes	201	103	0	0	381
1987–88	Leeds	39	7	0	0	28
	Total	240	110	0	0	409
Representative
Years	Team	Pld	T	G	FG	P
1984–86	Great Britain	2	0	0	0	0
1982–86	Lancashire	3	1	0	0	4

John Basnett (born 3 January 1957) is an English rugby union, and professional rugby league footballer who played in the 1980s. He played club level rugby union (RU) for New Brighton F.C., Winnington Park and for Cheshire in the RFU County Championship competition and representative level rugby league (RL) for Great Britain, and at club level for Widnes, as a wing.

== Background ==
Born in Wallasey, Cheshire, Basnett attended Ellesmere Port Grammar School.

== Playing career ==
=== Rugby union ===
Basnett started his career as a rugby union player, joining New Brighton F.C. at the age of 16. In 1978, he represented England under-23's against Holland.

Basnett returned to rugby union at the end of his career, playing for Winnington Park.

=== Widnes ===
Basnett turned professional in April 1981, joining rugby league club Widnes.

Basnett played left wing in Widnes 14–14 draw with Hull F.C. in the 1982 Challenge Cup Final during the 1981–82 season at Wembley Stadium, London on Saturday 1 May 1982, and played left wing in the 9–18 defeat by Hull F.C. in the replay at Elland Road, Leeds on Wednesday 19 May 1982.

At the end of the 1982–83 season, Basnett scored two tries in the 22–10 win against Hull in the 1982–83 Premiership final at Old Trafford.

During the 1983–84 season, Basnett played left wing in Widnes' 8–12 defeat by Barrow in the 1983 Lancashire Cup Final at Central Park, Wigan on Saturday 1 October 1983, and played left wing in the 19–6 victory over Wigan in the 1984 Challenge Cup Final at Wembley Stadium, London on Saturday 5 May 1984, in front of a crowd of 80,116.

Basnett was the first Widnes player to score five tries in a match, scoring them in a John Player Trophy tie away to Batley, he later repeated this feat scoring all five tries in a 26–8 league win over Hull Kingston Rovers in 1986.

=== Leeds ===
In August 1987, Basnett was transferred to Leeds for a fee of £50,000.

Basnett played left wing (replaced by substitute Carl Gibson) in Leeds' 14–15 defeat by St. Helens in the 1987–88 John Player Special Trophy Final during the 1987–88 season at Central Park, Wigan on Saturday 9 January 1988.

After one season at Leeds, Basnett was involved in a car crash, and retired due to the injuries suffered in the incident.

=== International honours ===
Basnett won his first cap for Great Britain while at Widnes in 1984 against France. He was selected for the 1984 Great Britain Lions tour as a replacement for the injured Ronnie Duane.

His only other Test appearance for Great Britain was in the 1985–1988 Rugby League World Cup against Australia. Despite Basnett only playing in one game for Great Britain against Australia in 1986, Australian former captain Wally Lewis named him as one of the best English test wingers he had played against. Lewis praised Basnett's efforts in keeping his opposite number Dale Shearer quiet, although Great Britain ultimately lost the third Ashes test 24-15 played at the Central Park ground in Wigan.
