= Mark Flanagan (rugby league) =

English rugby league footballer

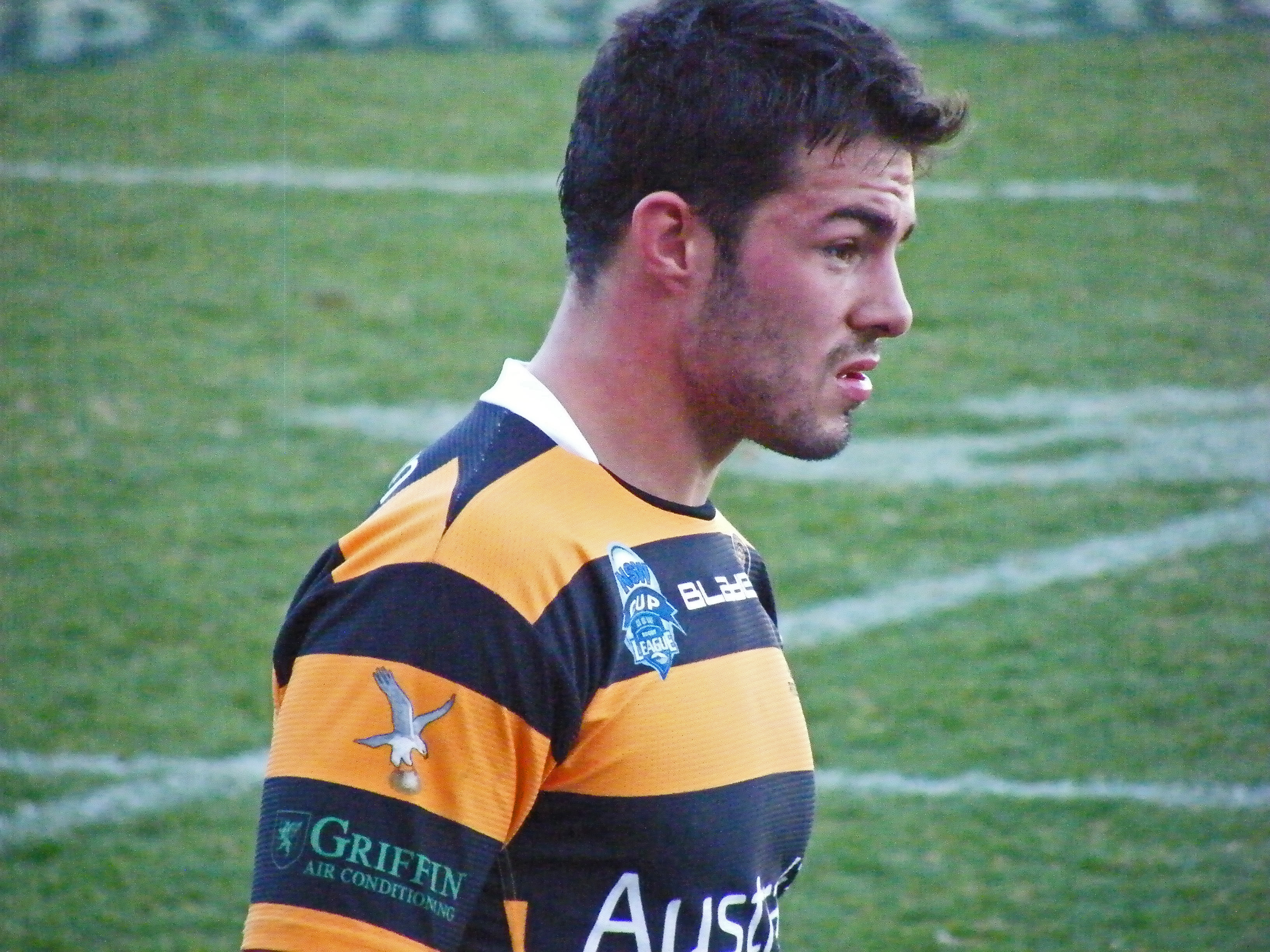

Personal information
- Full name: Mark Flanagan
- Born: 4 December 1987 (age 38) Oldham, Greater Manchester, England

Playing information
- Height: 5 ft 8 in (1.73 m)
- Weight: 15 st 4 lb (97 kg)
- Position: Loose forward, Second-row
Club
Years	Team	Pld	T	G	FG	P
2009	Wigan Warriors	11	1	0	0	4
2008(loan)	→ Halifax	9	6	0	0	24
2010–11	Wests Tigers	27	2	0	0	8
2012–15	St Helens	87	10	0	0	40
2014(loan)	→ Rochdale Hornets	3	0	0	0	0
2016–20	Salford Red Devils	111	9	0	0	36
	Total	248	28	0	0	112
Representative
Years	Team	Pld	T	G	FG	P
2012	England Knights	1	1	0	0	4
- Father: Terry Flanagan

Mark Flanagan (born 4 December 1987) is an English former professional rugby league footballer who played as a loose forward or second-row forward in the Super League and the NRL, and the England Knights at international level.

He played for the Wigan Warriors, St Helens and the Salford Red Devils in the Super League. He won the 2014 Super League Grand Final with Saints, and spent time on loan from the club at the Rochdale Hornets in the Championship. He also played for the Wests Tigers in the National Rugby League.

== Early life ==
Mark Flanagan was born on 4 December 1987 in Oldham, Greater Manchester, England. He is the son of former Great Britain international Terry Flanagan.

Flanagan started his rugby league career at the amateur side Saddleworth Rangers before joining the Bradford Bulls when he was 16. He was considered one of the most promising young British players and has caps for England Academy including caps against the Australian Schoolboys in 2006.

== Professional playing career ==
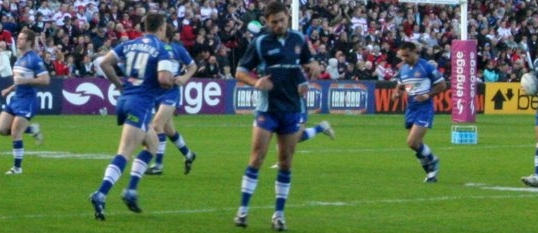
Flanagan warming up for Wigan

=== Wigan ===
On 4 January 2007 it was announced that Flanagan would join Wigan on a two-year contract with Wigan, paying £10,900 in compensation to Bradford for the loss of the player. He was signed to provide cover and possibly become a replacement to Australian stand-off Trent Barrett. Flanagan was the third player that Brian Noble had brought from his previous club Bradford, the other players being Stuart Fielden and Michael Withers. Flanagan was a regular in the Wigan reserves team. He went to Halifax on loan in June 2008 and scored two tries in his first game for the club.

After some impressive performances in the reserves Flanagan made his Wigan début from the bench during the second half of a 22–16 defeat by the Crusaders RL at Brewery Field. He made more appearances for Wigan putting in some very impressive performances, most noticeably for his defensive effort in the derby loss away at St Helens.

=== Wests Tigers ===
It was announced 23 September 2009 that Flanagan had signed a 1-year contract with the Wests Tigers, with the Tigers having the option for a further season. Tigers' recruitment manager Warren McDonnell described him as, "a raw talent," and, "a tough no-nonsense player with a strong work ethic." Flanagan played 21 games in his first season with the Tigers, mostly starting on the bench.

Having been left out of the side for most of 2011, Flanagan made his return late in the season and played in both of the Wests Tigers' semis appearances.

=== St Helens ===
It was confirmed on 19 July 2011 that St Helens had signed Flanagan on a 2-year contract, he made the move before the start of the 2012 season. The move meant that Flanagan was reunited with Head Coach Royce Simmons who he previously worked with at West Tigers.

St Helens reached the 2014 Super League Grand Final, and Flanagan was selected to play at scrum-half in their 14–6 victory over the Wigan Warriors at Old Trafford.

=== Salford ===
Flanagan left St Helens at the end of the 2015 season to join Salford, where he was reunited with his former Wests Tigers coach Tim Sheens.

He played in the 2019 Super League Grand Final defeat by St Helens at Old Trafford.

On 24 September 2020 Flanaghan confirmed his intention to retire at the end of the 2020 season. On 17 October 2020, he played in the 2020 Challenge Cup Final defeat for Salford against Leeds at Wembley Stadium.

== Personal life ==
In 2015, Flanagan opened an independent coffee shop with former Saints team mate Jon Wilkin in Manchester city centre. Mark married in Barcelona at the iconic Santa Maria Del Mar on 2 December 2017. Mark is the son of former GB international Terry Flanaghan MBE .
