= Mick Adams =

English rugby league footballer

Personal information
- Full name: Michael Adams
- Born: 28 September 1951 Widnes, England
- Died: 9 March 2017 (aged 65) Tamworth, New South Wales, Australia

Playing information
- Height: 5 ft 11 in (1.80 m)
- Weight: 13 st 7 lb (86 kg)
- Position: Second-row, Loose forward
Club
Years	Team	Pld	T	G	FG	P
1971–84	Widnes	415	68	39	26	309
1975–76	Canterbury-Bankstown	23	8	0	0	24
	Total	438	76	39	26	333
Representative
Years	Team	Pld	T	G	FG	P
1975–81	England	6	0	0	0	0
1979–84	Great Britain	13	0	0	0	0
1975–81	Lancashire	12	1	0	1	4

Michael Adams (28 September 1951 – 9 March 2017) was an English professional rugby league footballer who played in the 1970s and 1980s. He played at representative level for Great Britain and England, and at club level for the Canterbury-Bankstown Bulldogs and captained Widnes. He played as a second-row or loose forward.

== Background ==
Adams was born in Widnes, Lancashire, England, and he died aged 65 in Tamworth, New South Wales, Australia.

== Playing career ==
=== Championship appearances ===
Adams was a member of Widnes championship winning squad of the 1977–78 season.

=== Premiership Final appearances ===
Adams appeared in three premiership finals for Widnes; the 19–5 victory over Bradford Northern in the Premiership Final during the 1979–80 season at Station Road, Swinton on Saturday 17 May 1980, the 23–8 victory over Hull F.C. in the Premiership Final during the 1981–82 at Headingley, Leeds on Saturday 15 May 1982, and 22–10 victory over Hull F.C. in the Premiership Final during the 1982–83 season at Headingley, Leeds on Saturday 14 May 1983.

=== Challenge Cup Final appearances ===
Adams played for Widnes in seven Challenge Cup finals at Wembley Stadium. The first playing at second-row in the 14–7 victory over Warrington in the 1974–75 Challenge Cup Final during the 1974–75 season on Saturday 10 May 1975, in front of a crowd of 85,998. The following year again at right-second-row in the 5–20 defeat by St. Helens in the 1975–76 Final on Saturday 8 May 1976, in front of a crowd of 89,982, The third, in consecutive seasons was another defeat 7–16 to Leeds in the 1977 Final on Saturday 7 May 1977, in front of a crowd of 80,871. A second winners medal was obtained in 1978–79 in the 12–3 victory over Wakefield Trinity on Saturday 5 May 1979, in front of a crowd of 94,218. A third win was, playing Loose forward, and as captain in the 18–9 victory over Hull Kingston Rovers in the 1980–81 Final on Saturday 2 May 1981, in front of a crowd of 92,496. The following season he played in both the 14–14 draw with Hull F.C. in the 1982 Challenge Cup Final on Saturday 1 May 1982, in front of a crowd of 92,147, and in the 9–18 defeat by Hull F.C. in the replay at Elland Road on Wednesday 19 May 1982, in front of a crowd of 41,171. His last appearance in the final was as Loose forward, when again captaining the side, Widnes beat Wigan 19–6 in the 1983–84, on Saturday 5 May 1984, in front of a crowd of 80,116.

=== County Cup Final appearances ===
Adams played in seven Lancashire Cup finals, finishing on the winning side five times. 1974–75, a 6–2 victory over Salford at Central Park, Wigan on Saturday 2 November 1974; 1975–76, a 16–7 victory over Salford at Central Park, Wigan on Saturday 4 October 1975 and, a third consecutive final in the 1976–77 competition with a 16–11 victory over Workington Town at Central Park on Saturday 30 October 1976. Missing the final in 1977 Widnes made the final in both the 1978–79 and 1979–80 beating Workington on both occasions, 15–13 in 1978 and 11–0 in 1979 in games at Central Park and The Willows, Salford.

Adams last two appearances were both defeats, 3–8 to Leigh in the 1981–82, and 8–12 to Barrow in the 1983–84 final, both games played at Central Park.

=== Other notable appearances ===
Adams played in Widnes' 2–3 defeat by Bradford Northern in the 1974–75 Player's No.6 Trophy Final at Wilderspool Stadium, Warrington on Saturday 25 January 1975.

Playing at loose forward Adams played and scored a try in the 19–13 victory over Hull F.C. in the 1975–76 Player's No.6 Trophy Final at Headingley, Leeds on Saturday 24 January 1976,

In 1978 he played in the 4–9 defeat by Warrington in the 1977–78 Players No.6 Trophy Final at Knowsley Road on Saturday 28 January 1978 and was in the 13–7 victory over St. Helens in the BBC2 Floodlit Trophy Final during the 1978–79 season at Knowsley Road, St. Helens on Tuesday 12 December 1978.

Returning to the League Cup final in 1979 and 1980, Adams scored 2-drop goals in the 16–4 victory over Warrington in the 1978–79 John Player Trophy Final on Saturday 28 April 1979, and appeared in the 0–6 defeat by Bradford Northern in the 1979–80 John Player Trophy Final at Headingley on Saturday 5 January 1980.

A final League Cup final appearance was in the 10–18 defeat by Leeds in the 1983–84 John Player Special Trophy Final at Central Park, Wigan on Saturday 14 January 1984.

=== International honours ===
Adams won caps for England while at Widnes in 1975 against New Zealand, Australia (sub), and Australia, in 1978 against France, in 1979 against Wales, and in 1981 against Wales (sub), and won caps for Great Britain while at Widnes in 1979 against Australia, Australia (sub), and New Zealand (3 matches), in 1980 against New Zealand, and in 1984 against Australia (2 matches), Australia (sub), New Zealand (3 matches), and Papua New Guinea.

Adams announced his retirement shortly after the end of the 1984 Great Britain Lions tour, and emigrated to Australia.

== Honours ==
Club

- RFL Championship: 1977–78
- Challenge Cup: 1974–75, 1978–79, 1980–81, 1983–84
- Premiership: 1979–80, 1981–82, 1982–83
- League Cup: 1975–76, 1978–79
- Lancashire Cup: 1974–75, 1975–76, 1976–77, 1978–79, 1979–80
- BBC2 Floodlit Trophy: 1978–79

Individual

- Man of Steel Division One Player of the Year, 1979 and 1980
- Widnes Hall of Fame inductee, 1992
