= Ray Ashton =

Australian rugby league footballer

Personal information
- Born: 26 October 1960 (age 65) Widnes, Lancashire, England

Playing information
- Position: Scrum-half, Stand-off
Club
| Years | Team | Pld | T | G | FG | P |
|---|---|---|---|---|---|---|
| 1979–87 | Oldham | 212 | 72 | 4 | 26 | 275 |
| 1987–89 | Leeds | 68 | 9 | 0 | 5 | 41 |
| 1990–91 | Workington Town |
| 1993–96 | Bramley | 54 | 4 | 1 | 1 | 19 |
| | Total | 334 | 85 | 5 | 32 | 335 |
Representative
| Years | Team | Pld | T | G | FG | P |
| 1983 | Great Britain U-24 | 3 | 3 | 0 | 0 | 12 |

Coaching information
Club
| Years | Team | Gms | W | D | L | W% |
| 1990–91 | Workington Town |
| 1991 | Lancashire |
| 1993–96 | Bramley |
| | Total | 0 | 0 | 0 | 0 |

Ray Ashton (born 26 October 1960) is an English former professional rugby league footballer and coach who played as a scrum-half or stand-off. He started his career at Oldham and went on to play for Leeds before finishing his career at Workington Town and Bramley as a player-coach. He was also selected for the 1984 Great Britain Lions tour.

== Playing career ==
=== Oldham ===
Ashton started his professional career at Oldham, signing from Widnes Tigers in 1979. He made his debut on 16 September 1979 in the John Player Trophy against Leeds.

While at Oldham, he was selected to play on the 1984 Great Britain Lions tour, but did not feature in any Test matches.

=== Leeds ===
In January 1987, Ashton was signed by Leeds for a fee of around £40,000. He played in the 1987–88 John Player Special Trophy final for Leeds, losing 14–15 to St Helens.

He was part of the team which won the 1988–89 Yorkshire Cup, defeating Castleford 33–12 in the final at Elland Road.

== Coaching career ==
In July 1990, Ashton was appointed as player-coach at Workington Town. In September 1991, he coached Lancashire in the War of the Roses against Yorkshire. He was sacked by Workington in December 1991.

In September 1993, he was appointed in a player-coaching role by Bramley.
