= Mick Worrall =

GB international rugby league footballer

Personal information
- Full name: Michael Worrall
- Born: 22 March 1962 (age 63) Warrington, England

Playing information
- Position: Second-row, Loose forward
Club
Years	Team	Pld	T	G	FG	P
1980–87	Oldham	173	31	61		237
1987–92	Salford
1992–93	Leeds
1993–94	Rochdale Hornets
	Total	173	31	61	0	237
Representative
Years	Team	Pld	T	G	FG	P
1983	Great Britain U24	3	0	0	0	0
1984	Great Britain	3	0	0	0	0

Michael Worrall (born 22 March 1962) is a former professional rugby league footballer who played in the 1970s, 1980s and 1990s. He played at representative level for Great Britain, and at club level for Oldham, Salford and Leeds, as a second-row, or loose forward.

== Playing career ==
=== Oldham ===
Born in Warrington, Worrall was signed by Oldham from amateur club Crosfields, and made his senior debut in April 1980 against Bramley. He played second-row in Oldham's 6–27 defeat by Wigan in the 1986 Lancashire Cup Final during the 1986–87 season at Knowsley Road, St Helens on Sunday 19 October 1986.

=== Salford ===
In October 1987, Worrall was signed by Salford for £55,000.

He played second-row and scored a drop goal in Salford's 17–22 defeat by Wigan in the 1988 Lancashire Cup Final during the 1988–89 season at Knowsley Road, St. Helens on Sunday 23 October 1988.

At the end of the 1990–91 season, Worrall played for Salford in their 27–20 win against Halifax at Old Trafford in the 1990–91 Second Division Premiership final.

=== Later career ===
In August 1992, Worrall was transferred to Leeds in exchange for Phil Ford. In March 1993, he was signed by Rochdale Hornets for a fee of £10,000. He brought his playing career to an end in 1994 after turning down a new contract with Rochdale.

=== International honours ===
Worrall won his first caps for Great Britain while at Oldham in January 1984 against France. He was selected for the 1984 Lions tour, and appeared in the first two Tests against Australia, but missed the third Test due to requiring knee surgery.

== Coaching career ==
In 1995, Worrall was appointed as coach at Saddleworth Rangers. He has also previously coached the academy at Oldham.

In 2015, Worrall coached at amateur club Oldham St Annes.

== Personal life ==
Mick Worrall's brother, Tony Worrall, played rugby league for Warrington.
