= Alan Shepherd (cricketer) =

Australian cricketer

Personal information
- Born: 29 September 1912; Kilkenny, South Australia
- Died: 9 October 1998 (aged 86)
- Source: Cricinfo, 25 September 2020

Alan Shepherd (29 September 1912 – 9 October 1998) was an Australian cricketer. He played in twelve first-class matches for South Australia between 1931 and 1935.

== See also ==
- List of South Australian representative cricketers
