= David Hobbs (rugby league) =

English rugby player and coach (born 1958)

Personal information
- Born: 13 September 1958 (age 67) Hemsworth, Wakefield, England

Playing information
- Position: Prop, Second-row, Loose forward
Club
Years	Team	Pld	T	G	FG	P
1978–85	Featherstone Rovers	172+33	66	105	15	439
1984–87	Oldham	59+1	11	108	5	265
1987–94	Bradford Northern	212+12	30	501	32	1154
1994	Wakefield Trinity	7+3	0	1	1	3
	Total	499	107	715	53	1861
Representative
Years	Team	Pld	T	G	FG	P
1984	England	1	0	0	0	0
1984–89	Great Britain	10+2	1	5	0	14
1982–89	Yorkshire	6+1	2	16	0	40
1982	GB Under 24	2	0	7	0	14

Coaching information
Club
Years	Team	Gms	W	D	L	W%
1989	Bradford Northern
1990–93	Bradford Northern	0	0	0	0
1994–95	Wakefield Trinity
2005–08	Featherstone Rovers
	Total	0	0	0	0

David Hobbs (born 13 September 1958) is an English former professional rugby league footballer who played in the 1970s, 1980s and 1990s, and coached in the 1980s, 1990s and 2000s. He played at representative level for Great Britain and England, and at club level for Featherstone Rovers, Oldham, Bradford Northern and Wakefield Trinity (captain), as a prop, second-row or loose forward, and coached at club level for Bradford Northern, Wakefield Trinity and Featherstone Rovers.

== Background ==
David Hobbs was born in Hemsworth, Wakefield, West Riding of Yorkshire, England.

== Playing career ==
Hobbs made his début for Featherstone Rovers on Monday 27 March 1978, he later played at second-row and was man of the match winning the Lance Todd trophy in Featherstone Rovers' 14–12 victory over Hull F.C. in the 1983 Challenge Cup Final during the 1982–83 season at Wembley Stadium, London on Saturday 7 May 1983, in front of a crowd of 84,969, in one of the biggest upsets in Wembley history, during his time at Featherstone Rovers, he scored fifty 3-point tries, and sixteen 4-point tries.

Hobbs played at prop and scored a conversion in Oldham's 6–27 defeat by Wigan in the 1986 Lancashire Cup Final during the 1986–87 season at Knowsley Road, St. Helens on Sunday 19 October 1986.

He was later transferred from Oldham to Bradford Northern.

Hobbs played as an interchange/substitute (replacing prop Jeff Grayshon) and scored 2-conversions in Bradford Northern's 12–12 draw with Castleford in the 1987 Yorkshire Cup Final during the 1987–88 season at Headingley, Leeds on Saturday 17 October 1987, played at prop, scored a conversion, and a drop goal in the 11–2 victory over Castleford in the 1987 Yorkshire Cup Final replay during the 1987–88 season at Elland Road, Leeds on Saturday 31 October 1987, played at second-row, was captain, and scored two conversions in the 20–14 victory over Featherstone Rovers in the 1989 Yorkshire Cup Final during the 1989–90 season at Headingley, Leeds on Sunday 5 November 1989, and played at second-row, was coach, and scored a conversion in the 6–28 defeat by Castleford in the 1991 Yorkshire Cup Final during the 1991–92 season at Elland Road, Leeds on Sunday 20 October 1991.

Hobbs was the coach, played at prop and scored a conversion in Bradford Northern's 2–12 defeat by Warrington in the 1990–91 Regal Trophy Final during the 1990–91 season at Headingley, Leeds on Saturday 12 January 1991, and was the coach, played at prop and scored a conversion in the 15–8 defeat by Wigan in the 1992–93 Regal Trophy Final during the 1992–93 season at Elland Road, Leeds on Saturday 23 January 1993.

Hobbs also won caps for England while at Featherstone Rovers in 1984 against Wales, and won caps for Great Britain while at Featherstone Rovers in 1984 against France (2 matches), Australia, Australia (sub), New Zealand (3 matches), and Papua New Guinea, while at Oldham in 1987 against France (2 matches), and while at Bradford Northern in 1989 against New Zealand, and New Zealand (sub).

Hobbs won a cap for Yorkshire while at Featherstone Rovers; during the 1982–83 season as an interchange/substitute against Cumbria.

== Coaching career ==
Hobbs became coach at Bradford Northern until he left for Wakefield Trinity in 1994. He then went to Halifax as Director of Football. His brother, Kevin Hobbs, also played for, and coached Featherstone Rovers in 1999.

In 2005, Hobbs was appointed coach of his first team, Featherstone Rovers halfway through the season after Gary Price (referred to as "Gary H. Price" to avoid confusion with another Gary Price who played for the club) left, however he failed to save Featherstone Rovers from relegation.

== Honoured at Featherstone Rovers ==
David Hobbs is a Featherstone Rovers Hall of Fame inductee.
