= Andrew Simons =

Australian rugby league footballer

Personal information
- Born: 13 June 1961 (age 64)

Playing information
- Position: Wing
Club
Years	Team	Pld	T	G	FG	P
1982–88	North Sydney Bears	105	36	2	0	139
1989–90	Penrith Panthers	27	14	0	0	56
	Total	132	50	2	0	195

Andrew Simons (born 13 June 1961) is an Australian former professional rugby league footballer who played for the North Sydney Bears and the Penrith Panthers.

== Biography ==
Simons grew up in the North Shore of Sydney and started his first-grade career with North Sydney, where his brother Jeff Simons played in the late 1970s.

A winger, Simons debuted for North Sydney in the 1982 NSWRL season and featured in every game from the second round onwards, including two finals. He amassed a total of 105 first-grade appearances while at North Sydney and was the club's top try scorer with 11 tries in 1988, his final season.

In 1989 he joined Penrith and had the distinction of scoring a try in each of the first six rounds that season. He didn't miss a game all year for Penrith and played in the second finals series of his career.

Following the 1990 season, Simons left Penrith to play at Byron Bay.
