= Wayne Proctor (rugby league) =

GB international rugby league footballer

Personal information
- Full name: Wayne Proctor
- Born: 20 November 1963 (age 61); Hull, England

Playing information
- Position: Centre, Second-row
Club
| Years | Team | Pld | T | G | FG | P |
|---|---|---|---|---|---|---|
| 1982–89 | Hull FC | 128 | 13 | 0 | 0 | 52 |
| 1989–90 | Doncaster RLFC | 44 | 6 | 0 | 0 | 24 |
| 1991 | Ryedale-York | 2 | 0 | 0 | 0 | 0 |
| | Total | 174 | 19 | 0 | 0 | 76 |
Representative
| Years | Team | Pld | T | G | FG | P |
| 1984 | Great Britain | 1 | 0 | 0 | 0 | 0 |

Wayne Proctor (born 20 November 1963) is a former professional rugby league footballer who played in the 1980s. He played at representative level for Great Britain, and at club level for Hull FC, Doncaster RLFC and Ryedale-York as a centre, or second-row.

== Playing career ==
=== Hull ===
Proctor played second-row, and scored a try in Hull's 13–2 victory over Castleford in the 1983–84 Yorkshire Cup Final during the 1983–84 season at Elland Road, Leeds on Saturday 15 October 1983.

During the 1984–85 season, Proctor played second-row in the 29–12 victory over Hull Kingston Rovers in the 1984–85 Yorkshire Cup Final at Boothferry Park, Kingston upon Hull on Saturday 27 October 1984, and played second-row in Hull's 0-12 defeat by Hull Kingston Rovers in the 1984–85 John Player Special Trophy Final at Boothferry Park, Kingston upon Hull on Saturday 26 January 1985.

In December 1989, Proctor was sold to Doncaster as part of an exchange deal for Neil Turner.

=== International honours ===
Wayne Proctor won a cap for Great Britain while at Hull in 1984 against Papua New Guinea.
