= Gary Martine =

Australian rugby league footballer

Personal information
- Full name: Gary Martine
- Born: 26 October 1959 (age 66) Merewether, Newcastle, New South Wales, Australia

Playing information
- Position: Lock, Five-eighth, Second-row
Club
Years	Team	Pld	T	G	FG	P
1982–83	Parramatta Eels	18	1	0	0	4

Gary Martine is an Australian rugby league footballer who played in the 1980s. He played for the Parramatta Eels in the New South Wales Rugby League (NSWRL) competition.

== Playing career ==
Martine made his first grade debut in round 2 1982 against the St. George Dragons. Martine went on to play in 8 games during the 1982 season including the 1982 NSWRL grand final against Manly. Martine played from the bench as Parramatta defeated Manly 21–8 to win their second straight premiership.

In 1983, Martine played ten games for the club including the 1983 NSWRL grand final. Martine was again selected to play from the bench by coach Jack Gibson. Parramatta would go on to defeat Manly 18–6 in the final winning their third straight premiership 18–6. As of the 2022 season, no team has won three premierships in a row since. The grand final victory was also Martine's last game for the club.
