= Steve O'Neill (rugby league) =

England international rugby league footballer and coach

Personal information
- Born: 1 February 1958 (age 67) Widnes, Cheshire, England

Playing information
- Position: Prop, Second-row
Club
| Years | Team | Pld | T | G | FG | P |
|---|---|---|---|---|---|---|
| 1976–81 | Wigan | 119+5 | 12 | 0 | 3 | 39 |
| 1981–88 | Widnes | 202 | 12 | 0 | 10 | 55 |
| 1988–90 | Swinton | 27 | 2 | 0 | 4 | 12 |
| 1990 | Salford | 13 | 1 | 0 | 1 | 5 |
| | Total | 366 | 27 | 0 | 18 | 111 |
Representative
| Years | Team | Pld | T | G | FG | P |
| 1981 | England | 1 | 0 | 0 | 0 | 0 |

Coaching information
Representative
| Years | Team | Gms | W | D | L | W% |
| 1997–01 | Ireland | 6 | 3 | 1 | 2 | 50 |

Steve O'Neill (born 1 February 1958) is an English former professional rugby league footballer who played in the 1970s, 1980s and 1990s, and coached in the 1990s and 2000s. He played at representative level for England, and at club level for Wigan, Widnes, Salford, and Swinton as a prop or second-row, and coached at representative level for Ireland.

== Playing career ==
=== Wigan ===
O'Neill played at prop in Wigan's 10–26 defeat by Warrington in the 1980–81 Lancashire Cup Final during the 1980–81 season at Knowsley Road, St Helens on Saturday 4 October 1980.

=== Widnes ===
O'Neill was signed by Widnes in October 1981 for a club record fee of around £30,000. He was named in the Widnes team in their 14–14 draw with Hull F.C. in the 1981–82 Challenge Cup Final during the 1981–82 season at Wembley Stadium, London on Saturday 1 May 1982, and in the 9–18 defeat by Hull F.C. in the replay at Elland Road, Leeds on Wednesday 19 May 1982, but was an unused substitute on both occasions.

During the 1983–84 season, O'Neill played at prop in the 8–12 defeat by Barrow in the 1983–84 Lancashire Cup Final at Central Park, Wigan on Saturday 1 October 1983. He started at prop, and scored a drop goal in Widnes' 19–6 victory over Wigan in the 1983–84 Challenge Cup Final at Wembley Stadium, London on Saturday 5 May 1984.

He missed most of the 1985–86 season after suffering a broken leg in a league match against Wigan.

=== Later career ===
O'Neill signed for Swinton in October 1988. He played for Swinton in the 1988–89 Second Division Premiership final, but was sent off in the 18–43 defeat against Sheffield Eagles. He joined Salford in January 1990.

=== International honours ===
O'Neill won one cap for England while at Wigan in February 1981 against France.

== Coaching career ==
O'Neill was added to the coaching staff at Salford at the start of the 1990–91 season. From 1997 to 2001, O'Neill was the coach of the Ireland national rugby league team.

== Personal life ==
O'Neill is the brother of the rugby league footballer, Mike O'Neill.
