= Mike O'Neill (rugby league) =

GB international rugby league footballer

Personal information
- Full name: Michael O'Neill
- Born: 29 November 1960 (age 65) Widnes, England

Playing information
- Position: Prop
Club
Years	Team	Pld	T	G	FG	P
1977–90	Widnes	364	64	0	1	231
1990–91	Rochdale Hornets	25	3	0	0	12
1991–94	Leeds	68	7	0	0	28
1994–95	Widnes	24	0	0	0	0
	Total	481	74	0	1	271
Representative
Years	Team	Pld	T	G	FG	P
1980–89	Lancashire	9	1	0	0	3
1980–83	Great Britain U-24	5	0	0	0	0
1982–83	Great Britain	3	0	0	0	0

Michael O'Neill (born 29 November 1960) is an English former professional rugby league footballer who played in the 1970s, 1980s and 1990s. He played at representative level for Great Britain and Lancashire, and at club level for Widnes (two spells), Rochdale Hornets and Leeds, as a prop.

== Background ==
O'Neill was born in Widnes, Lancashire, England. Mike is the brother of former rugby league player and coach Steve O'Neill.

== Playing career ==
=== Widnes ===
During the 1978–79 season, O'Neill was an unused substitute in Widnes' 16-4 victory over Warrington in the 1978–79 John Player Trophy Final at Knowsley Road, St Helens on Saturday 28 April 1979. He played as a substitute in Widnes' 12-3 victory over Wakefield Trinity in the 1978–79 Challenge Cup Final at Wembley Stadium, London on Saturday 5 May 1979, in front of a crowd of 94,218.

O'Neill played in Widnes' 19–5 victory over Bradford Northern in the 1979–80 Premiership Final at Station Road, Swinton on Saturday 17 May 1980.

He played at prop in the 18–9 victory over Hull Kingston Rovers in the 1980–81 Challenge Cup Final during the 1980–81 season at Wembley Stadium, London on Saturday 2 May 1981, in front of a crowd of 92,496,

The following year, he played in the 14–14 draw with Hull F.C. in the 1981–82 Challenge Cup Final at Wembley Stadium, London on Saturday 1 May 1982, in front of a crowd of 92,147, and also played in the 9–18 defeat by Hull F.C. in the replay at Elland Road, Leeds on Wednesday 19 May 1982, in front of a crowd of 41,171. He played in the 23–8 victory over Hull F.C. in the 1981–82 Premiership Final at Headingley, Leeds on Saturday 15 May 1982.

He played the 22–10 victory over Hull F.C. in the 1982–83 Premiership Final during the 1982–83 season at Headingley, Leeds on Saturday 14 May 1983.

During the 1983–84 season, O'Neill played at prop in the 10–18 defeat by Leeds in the 1983–84 John Player Special Trophy Final during the 1983–84 season at Central Park, Wigan on Saturday 14 January 1984, and he played at second-row in the 19-6 victory over Wigan in the 1983–84 Challenge Cup Final at Wembley Stadium, London on Saturday 5 May 1984, in front of a crowd of 80,116.

O'Neill played in Widnes' victories in the Championship during the 1987–88 season and 1988–89 season. He also played in the 38-14 victory over Hull F.C. in the 1987–88 Premiership Final during the 1987–88 season at Old Trafford, Manchester on Sunday 15 May 1988.

O'Neill played in Widnes' 20-14 victory over Wigan in the Charity Shield during the 1988–89 season at Okells Bowl, Douglas, Isle of Man on Sunday 21 August 1988, and played at second-row in the 6–12 defeat by Wigan in the 1988–89 John Player Special Trophy Final during the 1988–89 season at Burnden Park, Bolton on Saturday 7 January 1989. He also appeared in the 18–10 victory over St Helens in the 1988–89 Premiership Final during the 1988–89 season at Old Trafford, Manchester on Sunday 14 May 1989.

In the 1989–90 season, he played in the 27–22 victory over Wigan in the Charity Shield at Anfield, Liverpool on Sunday 27 August 1989, and in the 28–6 victory over Bradford Northern in the 1989–90 Premiership Final at Old Trafford, Manchester on Sunday 13 May 1990.

=== Rochdale Hornets ===
In 1990, O'Neill was signed by Rochdale Hornets for a club-record fee of £70,000.

=== Leeds ===
In 1991, O'Neill was signed by Leeds in a part-exchange deal, with Rochdale receiving a fee of £20,000 plus the New Zealand international, Mike Kuiti. He was a substitute in Leeds' 16-26 defeat by Wigan in the 1993–94 Challenge Cup Final during the 1993–94 season at Wembley Stadium, London on Saturday 30 April 1994, in front of a crowd of 78,348. In doing so he set, and still holds, the record for the longest time span between first and last Challenge Cup Final appearances.

=== International honours ===
O'Neill won caps for Great Britain while at Widnes in 1982, against France and Australia, and in 1983, against France (2 matches).

In addition to the above Test Matches, O'Neill played at prop in Great Britain's 7-8 defeat by France in the friendly at Stadio Pier Luigi Penzo, Venice on Saturday 31 July 1982; he also played 5-times for Great Britain Under-24 team.

O'Neill was selected for the 1984 Great Britain Lions tour of Australia and New Zealand.
