= Steve Larder =

Australian rugby league footballer

Personal information
- Born: 5 March 1963 (age 62); Darwin, Northern Territory, Australia

Playing information
- Position: Fullback, Wing
Club
Years	Team	Pld	T	G	FG	P
1985–89	Illawarra Steelers	61	17	41		150
1989–91	Castleford	62	39	10	1	177
	Total	123	56	51	1	327

Steve Larder (born 5 March 1963) is an Australian former professional rugby league footballer who played in the 1980s and 1990s. He played at club level for Illawarra Steelers and Castleford as a fullback, or wing.

== Background ==
Steve Larder was born in Darwin, Northern Territory, Australia, he has worked as real estate salesman as of c. 2015.

== Playing career ==
=== County Cup Final appearances ===
Steve Larder played fullback in Castleford's 11-8 victory over Wakefield Trinity in the 1990 Yorkshire Cup Final during the 1990–91 season at Elland Road, Leeds on Sunday 23 September 1990.

=== Club career ===
Steve Larder signed for Castleford from Illawarra Steelers on Saturday 1 July 1989, and made his début for Castleford in the 20-22 defeat by Featherstone Rovers on Tuesday 3 September 1989.
