= Richard Marsh (rugby league) =

English rugby league footballer

Personal information
- Born: 26 January 1962 (age 63)

Playing information
- Height: 5 ft 10 in (1.78 m)
- Position: Wing, Centre
Club
Years	Team	Pld	T	G	FG	P
1981–89	Featherstone Rovers	122	23	0	0	89
	Bramley RLFC			0	0
	Total	122	23	0	0	89

Richard Marsh is a retired semi-professional rugby league footballer who played in the 1980s. He played at club level for Featherstone Rovers and Bramley.

== Playing career ==
=== Club career ===
Richard Marsh made his début for Featherstone Rovers on Sunday 30 August 1981, during his time at Featherstone Rovers he scored three 3-point tries, and twenty 4-point tries.
