= David Sykes (rugby league) =

English rugby league footballer

Personal information
- Full name: David Sykes

Playing information
Club
Years	Team	Pld	T	G	FG	P
1988–88/89	Featherstone Rovers	18+3	3	0	0	12

David "Dave" Sykes is a former professional rugby league footballer who played in the 1980s. He played at club level for Featherstone Rovers.

== Playing career ==
David Sykes made his début for Featherstone Rovers on Friday 1 January 1988.
