= Des Foy =

English international rugby league footballer

Personal information
- Full name: Desmond J. Foy
- Born: 29 December 1963 (age 62) Oldham, Lancashire, England

Playing information
- Position: Centre
Club
Years	Team	Pld	T	G	FG	P
1980–82	Widnes	14	7			21
1982–91	Oldham	197	96			380
	Total	211	103	0	0	401
Representative
Years	Team	Pld	T	G	FG	P
1984–85	Great Britain	3	2	0	0	8
1995–96	Ireland	3	2	0	0	8

Des Foy (born 29 December 1963 in Oldham, Lancashire) is a former professional rugby league footballer, appearing for various teams in Britain, and Australia, and at the international level for Great Britain and Ireland.

Foy signed for Widnes at the age of seventeen, later transferring for an undisclosed fee to Oldham. In 1984, he toured with the British Lions to Australia, New Zealand and Papua New Guinea. In 1989 he signed for Newcastle Knights, returning shortly after to play again for Oldham, and for Huddersfield. He retired from club rugby in 1993.

His international career saw him make appearances for Ireland against such national teams as Scotland, and the United States. In 1995, he played for Ireland in the Rugby League Emerging Nations Tournament held in October in northern England. On St. Patrick's Day in 1996 he was on the squad against the USA Rugby League team, at RFK Stadium in Washington, D.C.

In 2014, he was named a Director of Rugby League Ireland. He has since developed a limited contact version of rugby league called X-League, that is played across Europe and the UK.
