= Alan Sheppard (rugby league) =

Australian rugby league footballer and administrator

Personal information
- Full name: Alan Cecil Sheppard
- Born: 2 October 1957 (age 68) Wollongong, New South Wales, Australia

Playing information
- Position: Wing, Centre
Club
Years	Team	Pld	T	G	FG	P
1979–85	North Sydney	104	23	0	0	78
Representative
Years	Team	Pld	T	G	FG	P
1978	NSW Country	1	0	0	0	0

Alan Sheppard sometimes spelt "Allan Sheppard" is an Australian former rugby league footballer who played in the 1970s and 1980s. He played for North Sydney in the New South Wales Rugby League (NSWRL) competition.

== Background ==
Sheppard represented NSW Country in 1978 before being offered a playing contract by North Sydney.

== Playing career ==
Sheppard made his first grade debut for North Sydney in round 1 1979 against Cronulla-Sutherland at North Sydney Oval which ended in a 7–34 loss. Sheppard made a total of 18 appearances for Norths in his debut year as the club finished last on the table and claimed the wooden spoon after winning only 2 games all year. Sheppard finished as North Sydney's top try scorer in 1979.

For the following two seasons, Norths finished towards the bottom of the ladder before finishing third in 1982. Sheppard missed out on the entire 1982 season due to injury. Sheppard played with Norths until the end of the 1985 season before retiring.
