= Andy Gregory =

English rugby league footballer (born 1961)

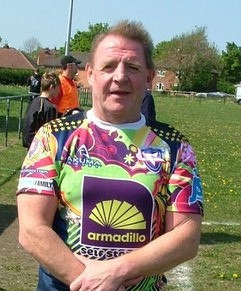

Personal information
- Full name: Andrew Gregory
- Born: 10 August 1961 (age 65) Ince, Wigan, Lancashire, England

Playing information
- Height: 5 ft 5 in (1.65 m)
- Position: Scrum-half
Club
Years	Team	Pld	T	G	FG	P
1979–84	Widnes	131+10	43	24	7	191
1984–86	Warrington	58+2	11	4	1	53
1986–92	Wigan	176+6	17	22	6	118
1989	Illawarra	9	3	0	0	12
1992–93	Leeds	27+1	2	1	0	10
1993–95	Salford	31+4	4	8	2	34
	Total	455	80	59	16	418
Representative
Years	Team	Pld	T	G	FG	P
1981–92	Great Britain	26	3	0	0	11
1988	Rest of the World	1	0	0	0	0
1981–89	Lancashire	9	1	0	0	4

Coaching information
Club
Years	Team	Gms	W	D	L	W%
1995–99	Salford Reds
2007	Blackpool Panthers
2026–Present	Hull All Blacks
	Total	0	0	0	0

Andrew Gregory (born 10 August 1961) is an English former professional rugby league footballer. A Great Britain international representative scrum-half, he is an inductee of the Wigan Hall of Fame. He was the first player to win five Challenge Cup Final winners medals, first player to play in eight Challenge Cup finals and one of only two players to have played in six Ashes series against Australia (1982, 1984, 1986, 1988, 1990 and 1992), the other being Garry Schofield. In May 2026 he was appointed as Head Coach of the Hull All Blacks, a beach rugby team, and in his debut tournament, Majorca Beach Rugby, he led the team to become the Roger Mews Memorial trophy winners as well as the Wooden Spoon Champions 2026.

== Early life ==
Gregory was born in Ince-in-Makerfield, Lancashire, England.

He played junior rugby league in the town for the local Wigan St Patricks club. He also had a trial for Salford (where his father had played) at the age of 17, but was signed by Widnes.

== Playing career ==
=== Widnes ===
Gregory played for Widnes from 1979 until 1984, towards the end of the famous "Cup Kings" era. In his first full season for Widnes, he forced his way into the first team and became a regular fixture from then on. Despite having a tooth removed the night before the game, the end of his début season was capped with a trip to Wembley for his first Challenge Cup Final. Andy Gregory played scrum-half, and scored a try in Widnes' 18-9 victory over Hull Kingston Rovers in the 1981 Challenge Cup Final during the 1980–81 season at Wembley Stadium, London on Saturday 2 May 1981, in front of a crowd of 92,496, and almost won the Lance Todd Trophy, played scrum-half, and scored a conversion in the 14-14 draw with Hull F.C. in the 1982 Challenge Cup Final during the 1981–82 season at Wembley Stadium, London on Saturday 1 May 1982, in front of a crowd of 92,147, and played scrum-half in the 9-18 defeat by Hull F.C. in the 1982 Challenge Cup Final replay during the 1981–82 season at Elland Road, Leeds on Wednesday 19 May 1982, in front of a crowd of 41,171, . In total, he played 141 games for Widnes scoring 43 tries, and earning GB caps while at the club.

Gregory played Scrum-half in Widnes' 3–8 defeat by Leigh in the 1981 Lancashire Cup Final during the 1981–82 season at Central Park, Wigan on Saturday 26 September 1981, played Scrum-half in the 8–12 defeat by Barrow in the 1983 Lancashire Cup Final during the 1983–84 season at Central Park, Wigan on Saturday 1 October 1983,

Gregory played Scrum-half in Widnes' 10-18 defeat by Leeds in the 1983–84 John Player Special Trophy Final during the 1983–84 season at Central Park, Wigan on Saturday 14 January 1984.

Gregory played Scrum-half in Widnes' 19-6 victory over Wigan in the 1984 Challenge Cup Final during the 1983–84 season at Wembley Stadium, London on Saturday 5 May 1984, in front of a crowd of 80,116.

=== Warrington ===
At the start of the 1984–85 season, Gregory refused to play for Widnes, and held out for a chance to play for his home town team. But Widnes refused the deal, and sold him in a deal between Widnes and Warrington for £75,000 and John Fieldhouse moving the opposite way to Widnes. Before leaving Warrington in 1986, he played 60 games as they won the 1986 Premiership Trophy Final against Halifax.

Andy Gregory played Scrum-half, and was sent-off for stamping on Nick du Toit in Warrington's 8–34 defeat by Wigan in the 1985 Lancashire Cup Final during the 1985–86 season at Knowsley Road, St. Helens, on Sunday 13 October 1985.

=== Wigan ===
Gregory finally signed for Wigan in 1986 for a reported then world record fee of £130,000. He made an immediate impact as he won the 1987 Player of the Year award, no small achievement as Wigan went on a run of 29 consecutive wins. Also in 1987, he played a big part in the inaugural World Club Challenge win over Australian champions Manly-Warringah, and although he was only small in height he dominated games on the field from scrum-half. In 1988, Gregory also kicked a goal in Wigan's 32–12 Challenge Cup final win over Halifax, winning the Lance Todd Trophy for the first time, a feat he repeated in 1990 as Wigan thumped Warrington 36–14. He was then selected to go on the 1988 Great Britain Lions tour.

Gregory had a successful career at Wigan, playing 182 times for the club and winning awards including the World Club Challenge, five Challenge Cups (the first player to do so), four Championships, two Regal Trophies, two Lancashire Cups, the John Player Trophy and a Premiership. He also became the first player to appear in eight Challenge Cup finals.

Gregory played Scrum-half in Wigan's 28–16 victory over Warrington in the 1987 Lancashire Cup Final during the 1987–88 season at Knowsley Road, St. Helens, on Sunday 11 October 1987, and played Scrum-half in the 22–17 victory over Salford in the 1988 Lancashire Cup Final during the 1988–89 season at Knowsley Road, St. Helens on Sunday 23 October 1988.

Gregory appeared as a substitute (replacing Centre Joe Lydon on 51 minutes) in Wigan's 12-6 victory over Widnes in the 1988–89 John Player Special Trophy Final during the 1988–89 season at Burnden Park, Bolton on Saturday 7 January 1989, and played Scrum-half in the 24-12 victory over Halifax in the 1989–90 Regal Trophy Final during the 1989–90 season at Headingley, Leeds on Saturday 13 January 1990.

In 1989, Gregory, and Wigan teammate, fullback Steve Hampson, played several months of the 1989 NSWRL season in the Winfield Cup with the battling Illawarra Steelers. Gregory playing a big role in their thrilling 20–22 loss to Brisbane Broncos in the mid-week Panasonic Cup Final played at the Parramatta Stadium in Sydney, winning the man-of-the-match award. It was the first time Illawarra had qualified for a cup final, the second coming in a 4-2 win over the Broncos in the 1992 Tooheys Challenge Cup Final.

Gregory also played nine league games for Illawarra, scoring tries against Penrith, Gold Coast Seagulls and South Sydney. His first league game was in Round 9 against Manly, and his last was in Round 20 against Eastern Suburbs.

During the 1991–92 season, Gregory played for defending champions Wigan as a scrum-half in their 1991 World Club Challenge victory against the visiting Penrith Panthers at the famous Anfield stadium in Liverpool.

=== Later career ===
Gregory was transferred to Leeds in 1992, after feeling he had no option but to leave Wigan when they gave him the terms of his contract extension following his return from the Great Britain Lions tour of Australasia. Gregory had no intention of leaving and wanted to retire as a Wigan player, but the club has been informed by medical staff that he was becoming too injury prone. He was sold for just £15,000. Gregory failed to achieve the same heights at Leeds as he did at Wigan, something not helped by the journey from home and successive injuries, and was then transferred to Salford after two seasons.

Gregory joined Salford for the 1994 season for a fee of £10,000, and in 1995 took on a player-coach role, finishing his playing career.

== International career ==
Gregory made his début as a substitute in Great Britain's 7–8 loss to France in the friendly at Stadio Pier Luigi Penzo in Venice, Italy on Saturday 31 July 1982. Gregory went on to win 26 Great Britain caps.

Gregory considers the dead rubber third test of the 1988 Ashes series against Australia to be the highlight of his test career. After Australia had dominated the first two games to wrap up the series, he was named Man of the Match as the British Lions overcame the Wally Lewis led Aussies 26–12 at the Sydney Football Stadium. Gregory set up flying wing Martin Offiah for the first try of the game, and fullback Phil Ford for the second. In the second half, it was Gregory again who chipped the ball for Henderson Gill to outpace Australian fullback Garry Jack score. Gregory also contributed to the final try as he ran from dummy half escaped his markers and found Mike Gregory for a final 70-metre try under the posts. It was Great Britain's first victory over Australia since the 18–14 victory during the second Ashes test of Australia's 1978 Kangaroo tour, played at the Odsal Stadium in Bradford

His peers also recognised Andy Gregory's talent. When Australian former captain Wally Lewis was asked which English player caused him and his team most problems, he replied "A certain little halfback! That little bastard! I admired Andy Gregory as much, if not more, than any other player because of the creativity that he boasted and the determination to cause defeat for Australia. He was also one of the toughest players that I ever played against."

Despite previously announcing his retirement from international rugby league, he received a call to go on the 1992 Great Britain Lions tour of Australasia, where he earned his 26th, and final, test cap in the 22–6 loss to the Mal Meninga led Aussies in the first test of the series in Sydney. He regretted the decision, as he left the tour injured as he had not recovered from a leg strain that he received at the end of Wigan's season, and it was this injury that prompted the club's desire to sell him.

Gregory is one of only two players to play in six Ashes series against Australia, playing in the 1982, 1986 and 1990 series played in Britain, and the 1984, 1988 and 1992 series played in Australia. The other player was Garry Schofield who played in 1984, 1986, 1988, 1990, 1992 and 1994.

== Coaching career ==
Gregory coached Salford from 1995 until 1999. In 1995, Salford were excluded from the top division because of their resistance to a merger with nearby club Oldham, and despite finishing six points clear of the relegation zone. However, Gregory led them to a first-place finish in their Centenary Season (although they were not promoted), and first place again in 1996, when they were promoted to the Super League, a moment that Gregory describes as the highlight of his coaching career. Ironically, he coached Salford when they defeated Wigan in the quarter-final of the 1996 Challenge Cup competition, ending their 42 match unbeaten cup run.

Salford then went on to finish mid-table in 1997, and the Challenge Cup semi-finals in 1998, losing to eventually winners Sheffield Eagles.

Despite the initial success, Gregory left Salford by mutual consent in May 1999.

In 2006 Gregory returned to professional rugby league, as he was appointed as coaching coordinator at National League club Leigh.

In 2007 Gregory took over struggling National League Two side Blackpool, his first head coach role in eight years. Blackpool had not won for 25 games when he took over, however he was unable to turn things around, and the club finished the season without a win, and Gregory left the club at the end of the season.

In 1996, Gregory also coached the Great Britain Nines side for the twelve nation World Cup in Australia, leading them to the semi-finals before an eventual loss to Western Samoa.

In May 2026 he was appointed as Head Coach of the Hull All Blacks, a beach rugby team, and in his debut tournament, Majorca Beach Rugby, he led the team to become the Roger Mews Memorial trophy winners as well as the Wooden Spoon Champions 2026.

== Outside professional rugby league ==
Since leaving professional rugby league, Gregory has taken an active role in charity work, including charity evenings to support the Royal British Legion, and fund raising games for the GB All Stars to support the charity Life for a Kid, among others.

In 2000 Gregory's book, Pint Size was published. The book was warmly received by fans, despite some stories that were easily contested, including his description of a Wigan versus Halifax match that actually took place after he had joined Leeds.

Achievements
Preceded by Joe Lydon	Rugby league transfer record Warrington to Wigan; 1987	Succeeded by Lee Crooks
