= Mal Graham (rugby league) =

Australian rugby league footballer

Personal information
- Full name: Malory Graham
- Born: 6 March 1961 (age 64); Newcastle, New South Wales, Australia

Playing information
- Position: Second-row, Centre, Wing
Club
Years	Team	Pld	T	G	FG	P
1982–83	Newtown Jets	47	9	0	0	29
1984–85	Hunslet	30	17	0	0	68
1985–86	Oldham	65	21	0	0	84
1986–87	Bradford Northern	25	12	0	1	49
	Total	167	59	0	1	230
Representative
Years	Team	Pld	T	G	FG	P
1981–84	NSW Country	2	0	0	0	0

Coaching information
Club
Years	Team	Gms	W	D	L	W%
1987–88	Oldham RLFC	0	0	0	0
- Source: As of 5 October 2022

Mal Graham is an Australian former rugby league footballer who played in the 1980s and 1990s. He played for the Newtown Jets in the New South Wales Rugby League (NSWRL) competition and for Hunslet, Oldham and Bradford Northern in England.

== Playing career ==
After playing for NSW Country in 1981, Graham signed with Newtown in 1982. Graham made his first grade debut for Newtown in Round 1 1982 against Eastern Suburbs. Graham made 21 appearances for Newtown in his first year there and scored 7 tries but the club missed out on the finals finishing in 7th place. It was a disappointing end to the year as only 12 months earlier the club had reached the 1981 grand final against Parramatta.

Graham played 26 games for Newtown in 1983 which would prove to be the club's last in the top grade of Australian rugby league. Graham played in Newtown's final ever match in the NSWRL premiership, which was a 9-6 victory over the Canberra Raiders at Campbelltown Stadium.

Following Newtown's exclusion from the premiership due to financial reasons, Graham returned to the country and was selected in 1984 to represent NSW Country against NSW City. Graham then headed to England and signed with Hunslet. Hunslet would go on to finish second last in the 1984/1985 season. Graham subsequently joined Oldham and played one season with them as they finished 9th on the table. Graham's last years in England was spent at Bradford and Oldham before he headed back to Australia at the end of 1988.

In 1991, Graham captain-coached Toronto Workers now known as Macquarie Scorpions to the Newcastle rugby league premiership. In 1994, Graham took Macquarie Scorpions to the 1994 Newcastle grand final but they were defeated by Kurri Kurri.
