= Harry Pinner =

English rugby league footballer

Personal information
- Full name: Harold Pinner
- Born: 26 September 1956 (age 70) St. Helens, England

Playing information
- Position: Loose forward
Club
Years	Team	Pld	T	G	FG	P
1974–86	St. Helens	332	78	140	73	604
1986–88	Widnes	36	2	0	1	9
1988	Leigh	11	0	0	0	0
1988–89	Bradford Northern	24	1	0	0	4
1989–90	Carlisle	10	1	0	0	4
	Total	413	82	140	74	621
Representative
Years	Team	Pld	T	G	FG	P
1980–81	England	3	0	0	2	2
1980–86	Great Britain	7	0	0	1	1
1977–81	Lancashire	7	2	0	2	8

Harold Pinner (born 26 September 1956) is an English former professional rugby league footballer who played in the 1970s and 1980s. He played at representative level for Great Britain and England, and at club level for St. Helens, Widnes, Leigh, Bradford Northern and Carlisle, as a loose forward.

== Background ==
Harry Pinner was born in St. Helens, Lancashire, England, he was the landlord of the Victoria Inn public house, in Newton-le-Willows, and Parr Arms public house, in Grappenhall, Warrington.

== Playing career ==
=== Club career ===
Pinner debuted for St Helens in December 1975.

Pinner played loose forward in St Helens' 11–26 defeat by Hull Kingston Rovers in the 1977 BBC2 Floodlit Trophy Final during the 1977–78 season at Craven Park, Kingston upon Hull on Tuesday 13 December 1977, and played loose forward in the 7–13 defeat by Widnes in the 1978 BBC2 Floodlit Trophy Final during the 1978–79 season at Knowsley Road, St. Helens on Tuesday 12 December 1978.

Pinner played loose forward in St Helens 0–16 defeat by Warrington in the 1982 Lancashire Cup Final during the 1982–83 season at Central Park, Wigan on Saturday 23 October 1982, and played loose forward in the 28–16 victory over Wigan in the 1984 Lancashire Cup Final during the 1984–85 season at Central Park, Wigan on Sunday 28 October 1984.

Pinner played loose forward, and was man of the match winning the Harry Sunderland Trophy in St. Helens' 36–16 victory over Hull Kingston Rovers in the Premiership Final during the 1984–85 season at Elland Road, Leeds on Saturday 11 May 1985.

In October 1986, he was transferred to Widnes in exchange for John Fieldhouse.

=== International honours ===
Pinner won caps for England while at St. Helens in 1980 against Wales, and France, in 1981 against France, and won caps for Great Britain while at St. Helens in 1980 against New Zealand (sub), New Zealand, in 1985 against New Zealand (3 matches), in 1986 against France, and while at Widnes in 1986 against Australia.

Only three players have scored drop goals for both England & Great Britain, they are Bobbie Goulding, Sean Long, and Harry Pinner.

== Honours ==
Pinner is a St Helens R.F.C. Hall of Fame inductee.

== Personal life ==
Pinner is the nephew of the rugby league footballer for St Helens, Warrington, Blackpool Borough, and Liverpool City; Harold 'Ike' Fishwick, and the rugby league footballer for St Helens; Bill Fishwick.
