= Mick Burke (rugby league) =

Former Great Britain and England international rugby league footballer

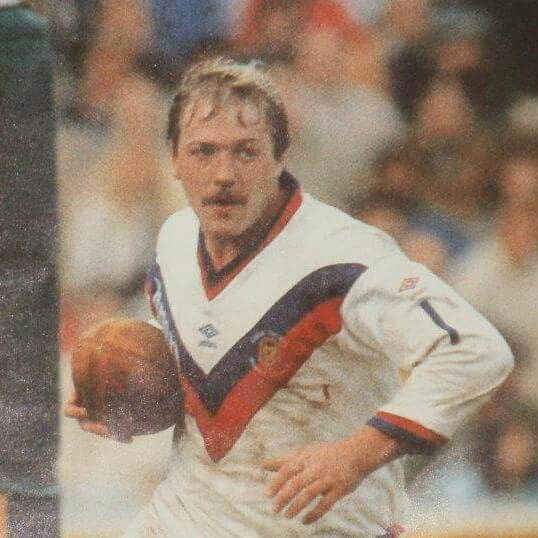

Personal information
- Full name: Michael Burke
- Born: 25 September 1958 (age 67) St Helens, Merseyside, England

Playing information

Rugby union
Club
Years	Team	Pld	T	G	FG	P
	Waterloo

Rugby league
- Position: Fullback, Wing, Stand-off
Club
Years	Team	Pld	T	G	FG	P
1978–86	Widnes	307	64	695	2	1611
1987–89	Oldham	50	9	56	1	149
	Total	357	73	751	3	1760
Representative
Years	Team	Pld	T	G	FG	P
1979–83	Great Britain U24	5	0	14	0	28
1979–85	Lancashire	5	1	20	0	43
1980–86	Great Britain	15	0	10	0	20
1984	England	1	1	4	0	12

Michael Burke (25 September 1958) is an English former rugby union and professional rugby league footballer who played in the 1970s and 1980s. A Great Britain and England international representative fullback, he played his club rugby for Widnes, with whom he won two Challenge Cups and two Lancashire Cups, and Oldham.

== Playing career ==
=== 1970s ===
After playing rugby union in his youth for Waterloo R.F.C., Burke turned professional and started playing rugby league for Widnes in 1978. Playing mostly on the wing in his first season, Burke helped his club to win the Lancashire Cup, the BBC2 Floodlit Trophy, and the Challenge Cup. During the 1978–79 season Burke played on the wing and scored 3 conversions in Widnes' 15–13 victory over Workington Town in the 1978 Lancashire Cup Final at Central Park, Wigan on Saturday 7 October 1978. He also kicked the winning penalty goal for Widnes in a match during 1978 Kangaroo tour of Great Britain and France against Australia. Burke played stand-off, and scored a try, and 2-conversions in Widnes 13–7 victory over St. Helens in the 1978 BBC2 Floodlit Trophy Final during the 1978–79 season at Knowsley Road, St. Helens on Tuesday 12 December 1978. Mick Burke played on the wing and scored 3 conversions in Widnes' 16–4 victory over Warrington in the 1978–79 John Player Trophy Final during the 1978–79 season at Knowsley Road, St. Helens on Saturday 28 April 1979. Burke played on the wing, scoring a try, and 4-conversions in Widnes' 12–3 victory over Wakefield Trinity in the 1979 Challenge Cup Final during the 1978–79 season at Wembley Stadium, London on Saturday 5 May 1979. That season Burke not only broke Ray Dutton's goal-scoring record, with 140 goals from his 47 games, but also Harry Dawson's long-standing points record for a season.

The following season, Burke took over the fullback role at Widnes. During the 1979–80 season he played on the wing and scored 2 conversions in the 11–0 victory over Workington Town in the 1979 Lancashire Cup Final at The Willows, Salford on Saturday 8 December 1979.

=== 1980s ===
Also during the 1979–80 season Burke played on the wing in Widnes' 0–6 loss against Bradford Northern in the 1979–80 John Player Trophy Final at Headingley, Leeds on Saturday 5 January 1980. Burke made his international début for Great Britain in 1980 against New Zealand. During the 1980–81 season Burke played at fullback, scored a try, and 4 conversions, winning the Lance Todd Trophy as Man of the match, in the 18–9 victory over Hull Kingston Rovers in the 1981 Challenge Cup Final at Wembley Stadium, London on Saturday 2 May 1981. Burke won further caps for Great Britain while at Widnes in 1981 against France (sub), During the 1981–82 season Burke played at fullback in the 3–8 defeat by Leigh in the 1981 Lancashire Cup Final at Central Park, Wigan on Saturday 26 September 1981.

Mick Burke played fullback, and scored a conversion in Widnes 14–14 draw with Hull F.C. in the 1982 Challenge Cup Final during the 1981–82 season at Wembley Stadium, London on Saturday 1 May 1982, in front of a crowd of 92,147, and played fullback, and scored 3-conversions in the 9–18 defeat by Hull F.C. in the 1982 Challenge Cup Final replay during the 1981–82 season at Elland Road, Leeds on Wednesday 19 May 1982, in front of a crowd of 41,171.

In 1982 he was man-of-the-match in Widnes' Premiership Final victory over Hull. Burke won further caps for Great Britain while at Widnes in 1983 against France. During the 1983–84 season Burke played at fullback in the 8–12 defeat by Barrow in the 1983 Lancashire Cup Final at Central Park, Wigan on Saturday 1 October 1983. Also during the 1983–84 season Burke played at fullback and scored a conversion in the 10–18 defeat by Leeds in the 1983–84 John Player Special Trophy Final at Central Park, Wigan on Saturday 14 January 1984. Burke won a cap for England while at Widnes in 1984 against Wales. During the 1983–84 season Burke played in the 19–6 victory over Wigan in the 1984 Challenge Cup Final at Wembley Stadium, London on Saturday 5 May 1984. Burke had earned a spot in the Great Britain side that toured Australia and New Zealand in 1984. Burke won further caps for Great Britain while at Widnes in 1984 against Australia (3 matches), New Zealand (3 matches), and Papua New Guinea.

Burke won further caps for Great Britain while at Widnes in 1985 against New Zealand (3 matches), and in 1986 against France.

Burke had amassed 316 points, beating the old record by 34 points. Burke was one of the original thirteen former Widnes players inducted into The Widnes Hall of Fame in 1992.

After retirement from playing, Burke worked in roofing before setting up a family-run home care company for vulnerable adults with his son, Michael Jnr.
