= 1981–82 Rugby League Premiership =

1981–82 Premiership
- Structure: National knockout championship
- Winners: Widnes
- Runners-up: Hull F.C.

The 1981–82 Rugby League Premiership was the eighth end of season Rugby League Premiership competition.

The winners were Widnes.

== First round ==
Date	Home team	Score	Away team
3 May 1982	Hull Kingston Rovers	17–8 (Note: Match abandoned after 56 minutes. Hull KR were awarded the win and progressed to the next round.)	Bradford Northern
3 May 1982	Leigh	1–1	Warrington
5 May 1982	Hull F.C.	23–8	St Helens
5 May 1982	Widnes	39–11	Leeds

=== Replay ===
Date	Home team	Score	Away team
5 May 1982	Warrington	10–9	Leigh

== Semi-finals ==
Date	Home team	Score	Away team
8 May 1982	Widnes	16–15	Hull Kingston Rovers
9 May 1982	Hull F.C.	27–7	Warrington

== Final ==
15 May 1982

Widnes	23 – 8	Hull F.C.
T-Burke, Wright, Basnett, Hughes, Adams; G-Burke (4)		T-Crooks; G-Crooks (2); DG-Crooks (2)

Headingley Stadium
Attendance: 12,100
Referee: Stan Wall
Player of the Match: Mick Burke

1	Mick Burke
2	Stuart Wright
3	Keiron O'Loughlin
4	Eddie Cunningham
5	John Basnett
6	Eric Hughes
7	Andy Gregory
8	Mike O'Neill
9	Keith Elwell
10	Brian Lockwood
11	Les Gorley
12	Eric Prescott
13	Mick Adams
Substitutes:
14	Anthony "Tony" Myler for Eddie Cunningham
15	Fred Whitfield for Brian Lockwood
Coach:
Doug Laughton

1	Gary Kemble
2	Dane O'Hara
3	James Leuluai
4	Steve Evans
5	Paul Prendiville
6	David Topliss
7	Kevin Harkin
8	Keith Tindall
9	Ron Wileman
10	Richard "Charlie" Stone
11	Trevor Skerrett
12	Lee Crooks
13	Steve Norton
Substitutes:
14	Terry Day for Dane O'Hara
15	Geoffrey "Sammy" Lloyd for Ronald "Ron" Wileman
Coach:
Arthur Bunting
