= 1982–83 Challenge Cup =

Rugby league competition

1982–83 State Express Challenge Cup
- Duration: 6 Rounds
- Number of teams: 33
- Winners: Featherstone Rovers
- Runners-up: Hull
- Lance Todd Trophy: David Hobbs

The 1982–83 Challenge Cup was the 82nd staging of rugby league's oldest knockout competition, the Challenge Cup. Known as the State Express Challenge Cup for sponsorship reasons, the final was contested by Featherstone Rovers and Hull F.C. at Wembley. Featherstone won the match 14–12, and is considered one of the biggest upsets in Challenge Cup final history.

== Preliminary round ==
Tie no	Home team	Score	Away team	Attendance
1	Wigan	14–4	Cardiff City	5,816

== First round ==
Tie no	Home team	Score	Away team	Attendance
1	Widnes	6–12	Leeds	5,861
2	Barrow	18–6	Whitehaven	4,898
3	Blackpool Borough	11–19	Hull	3,388
4	Huddersfield	5–13	Halifax	2,656
5	Hunslet	12–11	Hull Kingston Rovers	4,441
6	Salford	12–5	Leigh	6,519
7	Swinton	21–13	Doncaster	1,027
8	Wakefield Trinity	27–5	Keighley	3,446
9	Warrington	41–3	Bramley	3,241
10	St. Helens	52–0	Carlisle	2,875
11	Bradford Northern	23–5	York	2,685
12	Featherstone Rovers	21–5	Batley	1,374
13	Oldham	5–8	Workington Town	2,987
14	Rochdale Hornets	4–24	Fulham	701
15	Wigan	7–17	Castleford	10,737
16	Dewsbury	7–13	Huyton	563

== Second round ==
Tie no	Home team	Score	Away team	Attendance
1	Hull	32–15	Wakefield Trinity	11,197
2	Barrow	9–14	Castleford	6,779
3	Fulham	4–11	Bradford Northern	4,976
4	Hunslet	17–8	Halifax	4,130
5	Leeds	13–23	St. Helens	12,483
6	Salford	11–17	Featherstone Rovers	4,169
7	Warrington	34–2	Huyton	2,825
8	Workington Town	14–9	Swinton	1,751

== Third round ==
Tie no	Home team	Score	Away team	Attendance
1	St. Helens	10–11	Featherstone Rovers	6,125
2	Hunslet	8–13	Castleford	14,004
3	Warrington	4–10	Hull	10,280
4	Workington Town	0–17	Bradford Northern	3,894

== Semi final ==
26 March 1983

Bradford Northern	6 – 11	Featherstone Rovers
Try: Hanley, Van Bellen	Report	Try: Gilbert, Hudson, Marsden; Goal: Quinn

Headingley, Leeds
Attendance: 10,784
Referee: John Holdsworth (Leeds)

2 April 1983

Castleford	7 – 14	Hull
Try: England; Goal: Hyde	Report	Try: Day, Evans, O'Hara, Leuluai; Goal: Crooks

Elland Road, Leeds
Attendance: 26,031
Referee: Billy Thompson (Huddersfield)

== Final ==
Hull F.C. returned to Wembley as defending champions, having won the Challenge Cup for the second time in their history in the previous year. Hull went into the match as strong favourites, but were surprisingly defeated by their opponents Featherstone Rovers.

7 May 1983

Featherstone Rovers	14 – 12	Hull
Try: Hobbs (2); Goal: Quinn (4)	Report	Try: Crooks, Leuluai; Goal: Crooks (3)

Wembley, London
Attendance: 84,969
Referee: Robin Whitfield (Widnes)
Player of the Match: David Hobbs

FB	1	Nigel Barker
RW	2	John Marsden
RC	3	Steve Quinn
LC	4	John Gilbert
LW	5	Ken Kellett
SO	6	Alan Banks
SH	7	Terry Hudson (c)
PR	8	Michael Gibbins
HK	9	Raymond Handscombe
PR	10	Steven Hankins
SR	11	David Hobbs
SR	12	Tim Slatter
LF	13	Peter Smith
Substitutions:
IC	14	Paul Lyman
IC	15	Gary Siddall
Coach:
Allan Agar

FB	1	Gary Kemble
RW	2	Dane O'Hara
RC	3	Steve Evans
LC	4	James Leuluai
LW	5	Paul Prendiville
SO	6	David Topliss (c)
SH	7	Kevin Harkin
PR	8	Trevor Skerrett
HK	9	John Keith Bridges
PR	10	Richard 'Charlie' Stone
SR	11	Paul Rose
SR	12	Lee Crooks
LF	13	Steve Norton
Substitutions:
IC	14	Terry Day
IC	15	Mick Crane
Coach:
Arthur Bunting
