= 1980–81 Rugby League Premiership =

1980–81 Premiership
- Structure: National knockout championship
- Winners: Hull Kingston Rovers
- Runners-up: Hull F.C.

The 1980–81 Rugby League Premiership was the seventh staging of the end of season Rugby League Premiership competition.

The final was contested by Hull Kingston Rovers and Hull F.C. at Headingley, Leeds. Hull Kingston Rovers won the match 11–7, and was the first time the club had won the Premiership trophy. The prize money for the winning team was £4,000.

== First round ==
Date	Home team	Score	Away team	Attendance
26 April 1981	Wakefield Trinity	8–25	Castleford	4,403
29 April 1981	Bradford Northern	12–14	St Helens	5,224
4 May 1981	Warrington	7–19	Hull	4,889
6 May 1981	Hull Kingston Rovers	14–12	Widnes	13,508

== Semi-finals ==
10 May 1981

Castleford	11 – 12	Hull
Tries: Wraith, Crampton, J. Kear; Goals: Finch		Tries: Elliott, Banks, Dean; Goals: Woods; Drop goals: Dean

Wheldon Road, Castleford
Attendance: 10,660

10 May 1981

Hull Kingston Rovers	30 – 17	St Helens
Tries: Hartley (3), Hubbard (2), Lowe; Goals: Hubbard (6)		Tries: James, Litherland, Gorley; Goals: Pinner (4)

Craven Park, Hull
Attendance: 13,760

== Final ==
16 May 1981

Hull Kingston Rovers	11 – 7	Hull F.C.
Tries: Hogan, Hartley, Smith; Goals: Hubbard		Tries: Crane; Goals: Woods (2)

Headingley, Leeds
Attendance: 29,448
Referee: John Holdsworth (Leeds)
Player of the Match: Len Casey

1	Paul Proctor
2	Steve Hubbard
3	Mike Smith
4	Phil Hogan
5	Peter Muscroft
6	Steve Hartley
7	Paul Harkin
8	Roy Holdstock
9	David Watkinson
10	John Millington
11	Phil Lowe
12	Len Casey (c)
13	Dave Hall	Substituted off
Substitutions:
14	Chris Burton	Substituted in
15	Kevin Watson
Coach:
Roger Millward

1	Paul Woods
2	Gary Peacham
3	David Elliott
4	Tim Wilby
5	Paul Prendiville
6	Barry Banks
7	Tony Dean
8	Keith Tindall
9	Ron Wileman
10	Charlie Stone (c)
11	Trevor Skerrett	Substituted off
12	Mick Crane
13	Steve Norton
Substitutions:
14	Ian Madley	Substituted in
15	Robin Chester
Coach:
Arthur Bunting
