= 1981–82 John Player Trophy =

- Structure: National knockout championship
- Teams: 33
- Winners: Hull F.C.
- Runners-up: Hull Kingston Rovers

This was the eleventh season for the rugby league League Cup, which was once again known as the John Player Trophy for sponsorship reasons.

Hull F.C. won the trophy, beating derby rivals Hull Kingston Rovers by the score of 12-4 in the final, which was played at Headingley, Leeds, West Yorkshire. The attendance was 25,245 and receipts were £42987.

== Background ==
This season saw two changes in the entrants. With the entry of Cardiff City and Carlisle into the league and also this competition, no junior team was invited, and the number of entrants increased to thirty-three.
To cater for the odd number, a preliminary round consisting of just one single match was introduced.

== Competition and results ==
=== Preliminary round ===
Involved 1 match and 2 Clubs

Game No	Fixture Date	Home team	Score	Away team	Venue	Att	Rec	Notes	Ref
1	Wed 30 Sep 1981	Leigh	41-4	Blackpool Borough	Hilton Park	4235			

=== First round ===
Involved 16 matches and 32 Clubs

Game no	Fixture date	Home team	Score	Away team	Venue	Att	Rec	Notes	Ref
1	Fri 16 Oct 1981	Workington Town	22-9	Bramley	Derwent Park	2299			
2	Sat 17 Oct 1981	Hunslet	8-44	Widnes	Elland Road	1062			
3	Sat 17 Oct 1981	Warrington	24-15	Fulham	Wilderspool	2639			
4	Sun 18 Oct 1981	Batley	7-16	Featherstone Rovers	Mount Pleasant	1363			
5	Sun 18 Oct 1981	Carlisle	14-7	Cardiff City	Brunton Park	3224			
6	Sun 18 Oct 1981	Castleford	21-7	Leigh	Wheldon Road	5060			
7	Sun 18 Oct 1981	Dewsbury	2-34	Hull Kingston Rovers	Crown Flatt	3861			
8	Sun 18 Oct 1981	Halifax	7-26	Hull F.C.	Thrum Hall	9871			
9	Sun 18 Oct 1981	Huddersfield	19-17	Huyton	Fartown	931		1	
10	Sun 18 Oct 1981	Keighley	27-22	Wakefield Trinity	Lawkholme Lane	2454			
11	Sun 18 Oct 1981	Leeds	19-10	Wigan	Headingley	4976			
12	Sun 18 Oct 1981	Oldham	21-7	Doncaster	Watersheddings	1894			
13	Sun 18 Oct 1981	Rochdale Hornets	3-19	Bradford Northern	Athletic Grounds	2235			
14	Sun 18 Oct 1981	St. Helens	16-16	Barrow	Knowsley Road	5349			
15	Sun 18 Oct 1981	Swinton	32-5	York	Station Road	1862			
16	Sun 18 Oct 1981	Whitehaven	11-19	Salford	Recreation Ground	3351			

=== First-round replays ===
Involved 1 match and 2 clubs

Game no	Fixture date	Home team	Score	Away team	Venue	Att	Rec	Notes	Ref
1	Thu 22 Oct 1981	Barrow	17-0	St. Helens	Craven Park	5182			

=== Second round ===
Involved 8 matches and 16 clubs

Game no	Fixture date	Home team	Score	Away team	Venue	Att	Rec	Notes	Ref
1	Sat 31 Oct 1981	Widnes	16-10	Carlisle	Naughton Park	3818			
2	Sun 1 Nov 1981	Barrow	8-0	Bradford Northern	Craven Park	5512			
3	Sun 1 Nov 1981	Castleford	5-23	Hull F.C.	Wheldon Road	13464			
4	Sun 1 Nov 1981	Hull Kingston Rovers	18-6	Featherstone Rovers	Craven Park (1)	10017			
5	Sun 1 Nov 1981	Keighley	10-11	Salford	Odsal	2730			
6	Sun 1 Nov 1981	Leeds	13-8	Warrington	Headingley	5540			
7	Sun 1 Nov 1981	Oldham	13-0	Huddersfield	Watersheddings	2284			
8	Sun 1 Nov 1981	Swinton	19-9	Workington Town	Station Road	2433			

=== Quarter finals ===
Involved 4 matches with 8 clubs

Game no	Fixture date	Home team	Score	Away team	Venue	Att	Rec	Notes	Ref
1	Sat 14 Nov 1981	Barrow	12-14	Hull F.C.	Craven Park	9019		2	
2	Sun 15 Nov 1981	Oldham	14-5	Leeds	Watersheddings	3864			
3	Sun 15 Nov 1981	Salford	0-6	Swinton	The Willows	6728		3	
4	Sun 15 Nov 1981	Widnes	8-9	Hull Kingston Rovers	Naughton Park	11019			

=== Semi-finals ===
Involved 2 matches and 4 clubs

Game no	Fixture date	Home team	Score	Away team	Venue	Att	Rec	Notes	Ref
1	Sat 28 Nov 1981	Hull F.C.	22-6	Oldham	Headingley	11080			
2	Sat 12 Dec 1981	Hull Kingston Rovers	23-14	Swinton	Headingley	8193			

=== Final ===
Game No	Fixture Date	Home team	Score	Away team	Venue	Att	Rec	Notes	Ref
	Saturday 23 January 1982	Hull F.C.	12-4	Hull Kingston Rovers	Headingley	25245	42987		

==== Teams and scorers ====
Hull	№	Hull Kingston Rovers
	teams	
Barry Banks	1	George Fairbairn
Dane O'Hara	2	Steve Hubbard
Mick Harrison	3	Mike Smith
James Leuluai	4	Phil Hogan
Paul Prendiville	5	Peter Muscroft
Terry Day	6	Steve Hartley
Tony Dean	7	Paul Harkin
Trevor Skerrett	8	Roy Holdstock
Ron Wileman	9	David Watkinson
Richard 'Charlie' Stone	10	Steve Crooks
Mick Crane	11	Phil Lowe
Lee Crooks	12	Len Casey
Steve 'Knocker' Norton	13	Dave Hall
Kevin Harkin (for Tony Dean)	14	Chris Burton (for Paul Harkin)
? Not used	15	John Millington (for Roy Holdstock)
Arthur Bunting	Coach	
12	score	4
?	HT	?
	Scorers	
	Tries	
Ron Wileman (1)	T	
	Goals	
Lee Crooks (4)	G	George Fairbairn (2)
	Drop Goals	
Tony Dean (1)	DG	
Referee		G. Frederick "Fred" Lindop (Wakefield)
Man of the match		Trevor Skerrett - Hull - Prop
Competition Sponsor		John Player

Scoring - Try = three points - Goal = two points - Drop goal = one point

=== Prize money ===
As part of the sponsorship deal and funds, the prize money awarded to the competing teams for this season is as follows :-

Finish position	Cash prize	No. receiving prize	Total cash
Winner	?	1	?
Runner-up	?	1	?
semi-finalist	?	2	?
loser in round 3	?	4	?
loser in round 2	?	8	?
Loser in round 1	?	16	?
Loser in preliminary round	?	1	?
Grand Total			

=== The road to success ===
This tree excludes any preliminary round fixtures.

First round
St. Helens	16 (17)
Barrow	16 (0)
Rochdale Hornets	3
Bradford Northern	19
Castleford	21
Leigh	7
Halifax	7
Hull F.C.	26
Oldham	21
Doncaster	7
Huddersfield	19
Huyton	17
Leeds	19
Wigan	10
Warrington	24
Fulham	15
Hunslet	8
Widnes	44
Carlisle	14
Cardiff City	7
Dewsbury	2
Hull Kingston Rovers	34
Batley	7
Featherstone Rovers	16
Keighley	27
Wakefield Trinity	22
Whitehaven	1
Salford	19
Swinton	32
York	5
Workington Town	22
Bramley	9

Second round
Barrow	8
Bradford Northern	0
Castleford	5
Hull F.C.	23
Oldham	13
Huddersfield	0
Leeds	13
Warrington	8
Widnes	16
Carlisle	10
Hull Kingston Rovers	18
Featherstone Rovers	6
Keighley	10
Salford	11
Swinton	19
Workington Town	9

Third round
Barrow	12
Hull F.C.	14
Oldham	14
Leeds	5
Widnes	8
Hull Kingston Rovers	9
Salford	0
Swinton	6

Semifinals
Hull F.C.	22
Oldham	6
Hull Kingston Rovers	23
Swinton	14

Final
Hull F.C.	12
Hull Kingston Rovers	4

== Notes and comments ==
1 * RUGBYLEAGUEproject gives the attendance as 957, but the Huddersfield Yearbook 1981 gives the attendance for this match as 931.
2 * Wigan official archives give the score as 12-10 (obviously incorrect as Hull proceeded to the Semi-finals) but RUGBYLEAGUEproject gives it as 12-14.
3 * Wigan official archives give the score as 0-8 but RUGBYLEAGUEproject gives it as 0-6.
4 * RUGBYLEAGUEproject gives the attendance as 25,165 but Rothmans' Yearbooks 1990-91 and 1991-92 give it as 25,245.
5 * The attendance was a new record for the final, easily beating last year's previous record of 12,820.
6 * Headingley, Leeds, is the home ground of Leeds RLFC with a capacity of 21,000. The record attendance was 40,175 for a league match between Leeds and Bradford Northern on 21 May 1947.

== See also ==
- 1981–82 Rugby Football League season
- 1981 Lancashire Cup
- 1981 Yorkshire Cup
- John Player Trophy
- Rugby league county cups
