= Kevin Harkin =

English rugby league footballer

Personal information
- Full name: Kevin P. Harkin
- Born: 30 January 1952 (age 74) Wakefield district, England

Playing information
- Position: Stand-off, Scrum-half
Club
| Years | Team | Pld | T | G | FG | P |
|---|---|---|---|---|---|---|
| 1969–74 | Wakefield Trinity | 111 | 16 | 3 | 0 | 55 |
| 1974 | Sunshine Coast |
| 1975–81 | York | 26 | 5 | 0 | 0 | 15 |
| 1981–84 | Hull FC | 69 | 19 | 0 | 0 | 60 |
| 1985–86 | Wakefield Trinity | 17 | 1 | 0 | 0 | 4 |
| | Total | 223 | 41 | 3 | 0 | 134 |
Representative
| Years | Team | Pld | T | G | FG | P |
| 1974 | Wide Bay Division | ≥1 |
- Relatives: Paul Harkin (cousin)

Kevin Harkin (born 30 January 1952) is an English former professional rugby league footballer who played in the 1960s, 1970s and 1980s. He played at representative level for Wide Bay Division, and at club level for Wakefield Trinity (two spells), Sunshine Coast, York and Hull FC, as a stand-off or scrum-half.

== Background ==
Kevin Harkin's birth was registered in Wakefield, West Riding of Yorkshire, England.

== Playing career ==
=== Club career ===
During his time at Wakefield Trinity he scored fifteen 3-point tries and, one 4-point try.

Harkin played scrum-half in Wakefield Trinity's 11–22 defeat by Halifax in the 1971–72 Players No.6 Trophy Final during the 1971–72 season at Odsal Stadium, Bradford on Saturday 22 January 1972, in front of a crowd of 7,975.

=== Australia ===
After five years with Wakefield, Harkin moved to Australia where he played for Nambour Souths in the Sunshine Coast competition. He played in Wide Bay Division's match against Great Britain in the 1974 Great Britain Lions tour match.

=== York ===
Harkin played in York's 2-29 defeat by Australia at Clarence Street, York on Tuesday 14 November 1978, under temporary floodlights. He played 146 games for the club between 1975 and 1981.

=== Hull ===
Harkin played in Hull FC's 8–23 defeat by Widnes the Premiership Final during the 1981–82 season at Headingley Rugby Stadium, Leeds on Saturday 15 May 1982, in front of a crowd of 12,100.

Harkin played stand-off in Hull FC's 14–14 draw with Widnes in the 1982 Challenge Cup Final during the 1981–82 season at Wembley Stadium, London on Saturday 1 May 1982, in front of a crowd of 92,147, but was replaced by Tony Dean played in the replay. He played stand-off (replaced by substitute Terry Day, following a collision with Featherstone Rovers' Terry Hudson) in the 12–14 defeat by Featherstone Rovers in the 1983 Challenge Cup Final during the 1982–83 season at Wembley Stadium, London on Saturday 7 May 1983, in front of a crowd of 84,969.

Harkin played scrum-half in Hull FC's 18–7 victory over Bradford Northern in the 1982 Yorkshire Cup Final during the 1982–83 season at Elland Road, Leeds on Saturday 2 October 1982.

He played as a substitute (replacing scrum-half Tony Dean) in Hull FC's 12–4 victory over Hull Kingston Rovers in the 1981–82 John Player Trophy Final during the 1981–82 season at Headingley, Leeds on Saturday 23 January 1982.

== Genealogical information ==
Kevin Harkin is the cousin of the rugby league footballers; Paul Harkin and Terry Harkin.

== Honoured at York ==
Kevin Harkin is a York 'Hall of Fame' inductee.

== Outside rugby league ==
Kevin Harkin was the Landlord of The Weavers Arms, 33 Storrs Hill Road, Ossett, Wakefield.
