= 1982–83 Yorkshire Cup =

- Structure: Regional knockout championship
- Teams: 16
- Winners: Hull
- Runners-up: Bradford Northern

The 1982–83 Yorkshire Cup was the seventy-fifth occasion on which the Yorkshire Cup competition was held.

Hull F.C. won the trophy by beating Bradford Northern by a score of 18–7.

The match was played at Elland Road, Leeds, now in West Yorkshire. The attendance was 11,755 and receipts were £21,950.

This is the first of three successive Yorkshire Cup final victories by Hull F.C. and the first of four final appearances in five years. It is also the second successive year that Bradford Northern played in the Yorkshire Cup final; on both occasions they ended as runner-up.

== Background ==
This season there were no junior/amateur clubs taking part, no new entrants and no "leavers", so the total of entries remained the same, at sixteen.

This in turn resulted in no byes in the first round.

== Competition and results ==
=== Round 1 ===
Round 1 involved eight matches (with no byes) and 16 clubs.

Game no.	Fixture date	Home team	Score	Away team	Venue	Att	Rec	Notes	Ref
1	Sun 5 Sep 1982	Bradford Northern	15–14	Hull Kingston Rovers	Odsal	5244			
2	Sun 5 Sep 1982	Bramley	15–13	Wakefield Trinity	McLaren Field	1852			
3	Sun 5 Sep 1982	Castleford	10–33	Leeds	Wheldon Road	4906			
4	Sun 5 Sep 1982	Dewsbury	11–2	Doncaster	Crown Flatt	500			
5	Sun 5 Sep 1982	Halifax	4–14	Keighley	Thrum Hall	2163			
6	Sun 5 Sep 1982	Hull F.C.	36–5	Huddersfield	Boulevard	9153			
7	Sun 5 Sep 1982	Hunslet	7–19	Featherstone Rovers	Elland Road	1800		(Note: This was the first Yorkshire Cup match played by Hunslet at their new ground, Leeds United's Elland Road)	
8	Sun 5 Sep 1982	York	38–7	Batley	Clarence Street	2256			

=== Round 2 – quarterfinals ===
Round 2's quarterfinals involved four matches and eight clubs.

Game no.	Fixture date	Home team	Score	Away team	Venue	Att	Rec	Notes	Ref
1	Wed 8 Sep 1982	Bradford Northern	8–5	York	Odsal	2729			
2	Wed 8 Sep 1982	Featherstone Rovers	21–8	Bramley	Post Office Road	1479			
3	Wed 8 Sep 1982	Keighley	16–3	Dewsbury	Lawkholme Lane	1060			
4	Wed 8 Sep 1982	Leeds	0–20	Hull F.C.	Headingley	7731			

=== Round 3 – semifinals ===
Round 3's semifinals involved two matches and four clubs.

Game no.	Fixture date	Home team	Score	Away team	Venue	Att	Rec	Notes	Ref
1	Wed 15 Sep 1982	Featherstone Rovers	0–11	Bradford Northern	Post Office Road	2542			
2	Wed 15 Sep 1982	Keighley	3–23	Hull F.C.	Lawkholme Lane	3938			

=== Final ===
Game no.	Fixture date	Home team	Score	Away team	Venue	Att	Rec	Notes	Ref
	Saturday 2 October 1982	Hull	18–7	Bradford Northern	Elland Road	11,755	£21,950	(Note: Elland Road, Leeds, is the home ground of Leeds United A.F.C., with a capacity of 37,914. (The record attendance was 57,892 set on 15 March 1967 for a cup match Leeds v Sunderland.) The ground was originally established in 1897 by Holbeck RLFC, who played there until their demise after the conclusion of the 1903–04 season.)	

==== Teams and scorers ====
Hull	No.	Bradford Northern
	Teams	
Gary Kemble	1	Keith Mumby
Steve Evans	2	David Barends
Terry Day	3	Les Gant
A'au James Leuluai	4	Alan Parker
Paul Prendiville	5	Steve Pullen
David Topliss	6	Keith Whiteman
Kevin Harkin	7	Dean Carroll
Trevor Skerrett	8	Jeff Grayshon
John "Keith" Bridges	9	Brian Noble
Richard 'Charlie' Stone	10	Gary Van Bellen
Paul Rose	11	Graham Idle
Lee Crooks	12	Dick Jasiewicz
Mick Crane	13	Gary Hale
?	14	David Smith (for Steve Pullen)
Steve 'Knocker' Norton (for Mick Crane)	15	Phil Sanderson (Gary Van Bellan)
Arthur Bunting	Coach	Peter Fox
18	Score	7
7	HT	6
	Scorers	
	Tries	
Steve Evans (1)	T	Keith Whiteman (1)
Paul Prendiville (1)	T	
Paul Rose (2)	T	
	Goals	
Lee Crooks (2)	G	Dean Carroll (1)
	Drop goals	
Lee Crooks (2)	DG	Dean Carroll (2)
Referee		Stanley Wall (Leigh)
White Rose Trophy for Man of the match		Keith Mumby - Bradford Northern - Fullback
Sponsored by		
Competition sponsor		Webster's Brewery (Samuel Webster & Sons Ltd)

Scoring - Try = three points - Goal = two points - Drop goal = one point

=== The road to success ===
First round
Halifax	4
Keighley	14
Dewsbury	11
Doncaster	2
Castleford	10
Leeds	33
Hull	36
Huddersfield	5
Hunslet	7
Featherstone Rovers	19
Bramley	15
Wakefield Trinity	13
Bradford Northern	15
Hull Kingston Rovers	14
York	38
Batley	7

Second round
Keighley	16
Dewsbury	3
Leeds	0
Hull	20
Featherstone Rovers	21
Bramley	8
Bradford Northern	8
York	5

Semi-finals
Keighley	3
Hull	23
Featherstone Rovers	0
Bradford Northern	11

Final
Hull	18
Bradford Northern	7

== See also ==
- 1982–83 Rugby Football League season
- Rugby league county cups
