= Paul Rose (rugby league) =

Great Britain and England international rugby league footballer (born 1952)

Personal information
- Born: 20 December 1952 (age 73) Hull, England

Playing information
- Position: Prop, Second-row
Club
| Years | Team | Pld | T | G | FG | P |
|---|---|---|---|---|---|---|
| 1969–82 | Hull Kingston Rovers | 270 | 43 | 0 | 1 | 130 |
| 1977 | Dapto Canaries |
| 1982–86 | Hull FC | 94 | 12 | 0 | 0 | 41 |
| | Total | 364 | 55 | 0 | 1 | 171 |
Representative
| Years | Team | Pld | T | G | FG | P |
| 1977 | Yorkshire | 1 | 1 | 0 | 0 | 3 |
| 1977–78 | England | 2 | 0 | 0 | 0 | 0 |
| 1974–82 | Great Britain | 5 | 0 | 0 | 0 | 0 |

Paul Rose (born 20 December 1952) is an English former professional rugby league footballer who played in the 1960s, 1970s and 1980s. He played at representative level for Great Britain, England and Yorkshire, and at club level for Hull Kingston Rovers, the Dapto Canaries (in Wollongong, Illawarra, New South Wales, Australia) and Hull FC, as a prop or second-row.

== Playing career ==
=== Hull Kingston Rovers ===
Rose started his professional career at Hull Kingston Rovers, making his debut in September 1969 as a substitute against Leigh.

Rose played at prop in Hull Kingston Rovers' 16–13 victory over Wakefield Trinity in the 1974–75 Yorkshire Cup Final during the 1974–75 season at Headingley, Leeds on Saturday 26 October 1974, played at second-row in the 11–15 defeat by Leeds in the 1975–76 Yorkshire Cup Final during the 1975–76 season at Headingley, Leeds on Saturday 15 November 1975, appeared as a substitute (replacing prop Steve Crooks) in the 7–8 defeat by Leeds in the 1980–81 Yorkshire Cup Final during the 1980–81 season at Fartown Ground, Huddersfield on Saturday 8 November 1980.

Paul Rose played at second-row and scored a try in Hull Kingston Rovers' 26–11 victory over St Helens in the 1977–78 BBC2 Floodlit Trophy Final at Craven Park, Hull on Tuesday 13 December 1977.

Paul Rose played at second-row in Hull Kingston Rovers' 10–5 victory over Hull FC in the 1979–80 Challenge Cup Final during the 1979–80 season at Wembley Stadium, London on Saturday 3 May 1980, in front of a crowd of 95,000.

Paul Rose's Testimonial match at Hull Kingston Rovers took place in 1980.

=== Illawarra Rugby League ===
Paul Rose played at prop in the Dapto Canaries 18–5 victory over the Port Kembla Blacks in the Illawarra Rugby League First Grade Grand Final at Wollongong Showground, Wollongong on Sunday 18 September 1977, in front of a crowd of 12,641.

=== Hull FC ===
In August 1982, Rose was signed by Hull for a fee of around £30,000.

Rose played at second-row and scored two tries in Hull FC's 18–7 victory over Bradford Northern in the 1982–83 Yorkshire Cup Final during the 1982–83 season at Elland Road, Leeds on Saturday 2 October 1982, and was a substitute in the 29–12 victory over Hull Kingston Rovers in the 1984–85 Yorkshire Cup Final during the 1984–85 season at Boothferry Park, Kingston upon Hull on Saturday 27 October 1984.

He played at second-row, and received a 10-minute sin-bin following an illegal high-tackle on John Gilbert in Hull FC's 14–12 defeat by Featherstone Rovers in the 1982–83 Challenge Cup Final during the 1982–83 season at Wembley Stadium, London on Saturday 7 May 1983, in front of a crowd of 84,969, and played at second-row in the 24–28 defeat by Wigan in the 1984–85 Challenge Cup Final during the 1984–85 season at Wembley Stadium, London on Saturday 4 May 1985, in front of a crowd of 99,801, in what is regarded as the most marvellous cup final in living memory, which Hull narrowly lost after fighting back from 12–22 down at half-time.

Paul Rose remains unique in being the only player to win the Rugby League Championship with both Hull Kingston Rovers and Hull FC.

Paul Rose played at prop in Hull FC's 0–12 defeat by Hull Kingston Rovers in the 1984–85 John Player Special Trophy Final during the 1984–85 season at Boothferry Park, Kingston upon Hull on Saturday 26 January 1985.

Rose announced his retirement in February 1986.

=== International honours ===
Paul Rose won caps for England while at Hull Kingston Rovers in 1977 against France, in 1978 against Wales, and won caps for Great Britain while at Hull Kingston Rovers in 1974 against Australia (sub), in 1978 against Australia, and Australia (sub) (2 matches), and while at Hull in 1982 against Australia.

== Personal life ==
Paul Rose has lived in Leek, Staffordshire since c. 2000.

Paul Rose is related to the rugby league wing, centre or second-row who played in the 2000s for Hull Kingston Rovers (1997–03 & 2005-06), Collegians (in Wollongong, Australia, c. 2004), the York City Knights (2006) and the Rochdale Hornets (2007); Mark Blanchard.

== Honours ==
Hull KR

- Championship: 1978–79
- Challenge Cup: 1979–80
- Yorkshire Cup: 1974–75
- BBC2 Floodlit Trophy: 1977–78

Hull FC

- Championship: 1982–83
- Yorkshire Cup: 1982–83, 1984–85
