= Steve Quinn (rugby league) =

English rugby league footballer

Personal information
- Full name: Steven Quinn
- Born: 30 November 1951; York, England
- Died: April 2016 (aged 64)

Playing information
- Height: 6 ft 0 in (183 cm)
- Weight: 13 st 8 lb (86 kg)
- Position: Centre
Club
Years	Team	Pld	T	G	FG	P
1970–75	York	114	19	357	0	771
1976–88	Featherstone Rovers	393	75	1200	10	2656
	Total	507	94	1557	10	3427
Representative
Years	Team	Pld	T	G	FG	P
1977–81	Yorkshire	5	0	14	0	28

Steven "Steve" Quinn (30 November 1951 – April 2016) was an English professional rugby league footballer who played in the 1970s and 1980s. He played at representative level for Yorkshire, and at club level for Tang Hall junior school, Heworth A.R.L.F.C., York and Featherstone Rovers, as a goal-kicking centre.

== Playing career ==
=== County honours ===
Steve Quinn won caps for Yorkshire while at Featherstone Rovers; during the 1977–78 season against Cumbria and Lancashire, during the 1980–81 season against Cumbria, and Lancashire, and during the 1981–82 season against Cumbria.

=== Championship appearances ===
Steve Quinn played in Featherstone Rovers' Championship victory during the 1977–78 season.

=== Second Division appearances ===
Steve Quinn played, scored 163-goals (including drop goals) and 375-points and was Second Division Player of the Year, in Featherstone Rovers' Second Division victory during the 1979–80 season.

=== Challenge Cup Final appearances ===
Steve Quinn played at centre, and scored four goals, including the match-winning penalty, in Featherstone Rovers' 14–12 victory over Hull F.C. in the 1982–83 Challenge Cup Final during the 1982–83 season at Wembley on Saturday 7 May 1983, in front of a crowd of 84,969.

=== County Cup Final appearances ===
Steve Quinn played at centre, and scored three goals in Featherstone Rovers' 12–16 defeat by Leeds in the 1976–77 Yorkshire Cup Final during the 1976–77 season at Headingley, Leeds on Saturday 16 October 1976, and played at centre (replaced by substitute Neil Tuffs), and scored a goal in the 7–17 defeat by Castleford in the 1977–78 Yorkshire Cup Final during the 1977–78 season at Headingley, Leeds on Saturday 15 October 1977.

=== Testimonial match ===
Steve Quinn's benefit season/testimonial match at Featherstone Rovers took place during the 1986–87 season.

=== Club career ===
Steve Quinn signed for York in October 1970, making 114 appearances between 1970 and 1975, following a period out of rugby league from April 1975 to February 1976, he signed for Featherstone Rovers from York in a straight swap for Barry Hollis, he made his début for Featherstone Rovers, and scored 4-goals in the 23-9 victory over Wakefield Trinity in the 1976 Challenge Cup during the 1975–76 season at Post Office Road, Featherstone on Sunday 15 February 1976, his final starting appearance was against Widnes at Naughton Park on Sunday 13 November 1988, and his final appearance was against Leeds at Headingley, Leeds on Sunday 11 December 1988, during his time at Featherstone Rovers he scored fifty-four 3-point tries, and twenty-one 4-point tries, he went on to become Featherstone Rovers' record goal and point scorer, and finished his career with a total of 3,438 points. As of 2015, he is 10th in British rugby league's "most points in a career" record list behind; Neil Fox, Jim Sullivan, Kevin Sinfield, Gus Risman, John Woods, Mick Nanyn, Cyril Kellett, Kel Coslett and Lewis Jones.

== Honoured at Featherstone Rovers ==
Steve Quinn was an inaugural inductee of the Featherstone Rovers Hall of Fame in 1992.
