= Terry Day (rugby league) =

English rugby league player

Personal information
- Full name: Terrence Day
- Born: 1953 (age 71–72); Pontefract, Yorkshire

Playing information
- Position: Wing, Centre, Stand-off
Club
Years	Team	Pld	T	G	FG	P
1972–75	Dewsbury	85	21	6	0	75
1975–80	York	114	41	1	1	127
1980–81	Wakefield Trinity	40	13	0	0	39
1981–83	Hull F.C.	58	31	0	0	93
1983–84	→ Warrington (loan)	12	1	0	0	4
	Total	309	107	7	1	338
Representative
Years	Team	Pld	T	G	FG	P
1982	Yorkshire	2	0	0	0	0

Terry Day (born 1953) is a former professional rugby league footballer who played in the 1970s and 1980s. He played at club level for Dewsbury, York, Wakefield Trinity (captain), Hull FC and Warrington, as a wing, centre, or stand-off.

== Playing career ==
Terry Day made his début for Wakefield Trinity during September 1980, and he played his last match for Wakefield Trinity during the 1981–82 season, he was signed by Warrington from Hull F.C. on a season-long loan for the 1983–84 season, he made his début for Warrington on Wednesday 21 September 1983, and he played his last match for Warrington on Sunday 4 December 1983.

=== Championship final appearances ===
Terry Day played on the wing in Dewsbury's 22–13 victory over Leeds in the Championship Final during the 1972–73 season at Odsal Stadium, Bradford on Saturday 19 May 1973.

=== Challenge Cup Final appearances ===
Terry Day played at centre in Hull FC's 14–14 draw with Widnes in the 1981–82 Challenge Cup Final during the 1981–82 season at Wembley Stadium, London on Saturday 1 May 1982, in front of a crowd of 92,147, but was replaced by James Leuluai in the replay. He appeared as a substitute (replacing scrum-half Kevin Harkin) in the 12–14 defeat by Featherstone Rovers in the 1982–83 Challenge Cup Final during the 1982–83 season at Wembley Stadium, London on Saturday 7 May 1983, in front of a crowd of 84,969.

=== County Cup Final appearances ===
Terry Day played at centre in Dewsbury's 9-36 defeat by Leeds in the 1972–73 Yorkshire Cup Final during the 1972–73 season at Odsal Stadium, Bradford on Saturday 7 October 1972, in front of a crowd of 7,806, played at centre (replaced by substitute John Crossley Jr.) in York's 8-18 defeat by Bradford Northern in the 1978–79 Yorkshire Cup Final during the 1978–79 season at Headingley, Leeds on Saturday 28 October 1978, in front of a crowd of 10,429, and played at centre in Hull FC's 18–7 victory over Bradford Northern in the 1982–83 Yorkshire Cup Final during the 1982–83 season at Elland Road, Leeds on Saturday 2 October 1982, in front of a crowd of 11,755.

=== John Player Trophy Final appearances ===
Terry Day played stand-off in Hull FC's 12–4 victory over Hull Kingston Rovers in the 1981–82 John Player Trophy Final during the 1981–82 season at Headingley, Leeds on Saturday 23 January 1982, in front of a crowd of 25,245.
