= John Keith Bridges =

Great Britain and England international rugby league footballer

Keith Bridges
Personal information
- Full name: John Howard Bridges
- Born: 2 April 1952 (age 74) Pontefract, England

Playing information
- Position: Hooker
Club
| Years | Team | Pld | T | G | FG | P |
|---|---|---|---|---|---|---|
| 1970–79 | Featherstone Rovers | 235 | 45 | 5 | 3 | 145 |
| 1979–82 | Bradford Northern | 50 | 3 | 0 | 0 | 9 |
| 1982–83 | Hull FC | 29 | 1 | 0 | 0 | 3 |
| | Total | 314 | 49 | 5 | 3 | 157 |
Representative
| Years | Team | Pld | T | G | FG | P |
| 1975–77 | Yorkshire | 5 | 1 | 0 | 0 | 3 |
| 1975–77 | England | 9 | 0 | 0 | 1 | 2 |
| 1974 | Great Britain | 3 | 0 | 0 | 0 | 0 |
- Education: Normanton Grammar School
- Father: Keith Bridges

John Howard "Keith" Bridges (born 2 April 1952) is an English former professional rugby league footballer who played in the 1970s and 1980s. He played at representative level for Great Britain, England and Yorkshire, and at club level for Featherstone Rovers, Bradford Northern and Hull FC, as an occasional goal-kicking hooker.

== Background ==
Bridges was born in Pontefract, West Riding of Yorkshire, England, and he was a pupil at Normanton Grammar School.

== Club career ==
=== Featherstone Rovers ===
John "Keith" Bridges made his début for Featherstone Rovers on Wednesday 26 August 1970.

Bridges played hooker in Featherstone Rovers' 33–14 victory over Bradford Northern in the 1973 Challenge Cup Final during the 1972–73 season at Wembley Stadium, London on Saturday 12 May 1973, in front of a crowd of 72,395, and played hooker in the 9–24 defeat by Warrington in the 1974 Challenge Cup Final during the 1973–74 season at Wembley Stadium, London on Saturday 11 May 1974, in front of a crowd of 77,400.

He played hooker in Featherstone Rovers' 0–4 defeat by Warrington in the Captain Morgan Trophy Final during the 1973–74 season at The Willows, Salford on Saturday 26 January 1974.

Bridges played hooker in Featherstone Rovers' 12–16 defeat by Leeds in the 1976 Yorkshire Cup Final during the 1976–77 season at Headingley, Leeds on Saturday 16 October 1976, and played hooker in the 7–17 defeat by Castleford in the 1977 Yorkshire Cup Final during the 1977–78 season, at Headingley, Leeds on Saturday 15 October 1977.

He played in Featherstone Rovers' victory in the Championship during the 1976–77 season,

He played his last match for Featherstone Rovers during the 1978–79 Northern Rugby Football League season.

=== Bradford Northern ===
Bridges played hooker in Bradford Northern's 6–0 victory over Widnes in the 1979–80 John Player Trophy Final during the 1979–80 season at Headingley, Leeds on Saturday 5 January 1980.

Bridges played in Bradford Northern's victories in the Championship during the 1979–80 season and 1980–81 season.

=== Hull FC ===
Bridges played hooker in Hull FC's 18–7 victory over Bradford Northern in the 1982 Yorkshire Cup Final during the 1982–83 season at Elland Road, Leeds on Saturday 2 October 1982.

Bridges played in Hull FC's victory in the Championship during the 1982–83 season, and also in their 12–14 defeat by Featherstone Rovers in the 1983 Challenge Cup Final at Wembley Stadium, London on Saturday 7 May 1983, in front of a crowd of 84,969.

=== Representative honours ===
John "Keith" Bridges won caps for England while at Featherstone Rovers in the 1975 Rugby League World Cup against New Zealand, Australia, Wales, France, New Zealand, Australia, and Australia, in 1975 against Papua New Guinea (non-test), in 1977 against Wales, and won caps for Great Britain while at Featherstone Rovers in 1974 against France (2 matches), and Australia.

He won caps for Yorkshire while at Featherstone Rovers; during the 1975–76 season against Cumbria, Other Nationalities and Lancashire, and during the 1977–78 season against Cumbria, and Lancashire.

== Honoured at Featherstone Rovers ==
John "Keith" Bridges is a Featherstone Rovers Hall of Fame inductee.

== Personal life ==
Bridges is the son of Keith Bridges, who played rugby league for Wakefield Trinity and Castleford between 1954 and 1963. Although born as John Howard Bridges, he is nicknamed "Keith" after his father.

== Outside of rugby league ==
John "Keith" Bridges was the Bar Manager of the Pinnacle Suite Function Room at Dewsbury District Golf Club, Mirfield until 2017.
