= Gary Siddall =

English rugby league footballer

Personal information
- Full name: Gary Siddall
- Born: May 1957 (age 67); Featherstone, West Riding of Yorkshire, England

Playing information
- Position: Prop, Second-row
Club
Years	Team	Pld	T	G	FG	P
1978–89	Featherstone Rovers	167+20	26	0	0	93

Gary Siddall (May 1957), also known by the nickname of "Big Sid", is an English former professional rugby league footballer who played in the 1970s and 1980s. He played at club level for Featherstone Rovers, as a prop, or second-row.

== Playing career ==
Siddall made his début for Featherstone Rovers against Widnes on Sunday 10 September 1978, during his time at Featherstone Rovers he scored eleven 3-point tries, and fifteen 4-point tries.

=== Challenge Cup Final appearances ===
Siddall appeared as a substitute (replacing second-row Tim Slatter) in Featherstone Rovers' 14-12 victory over Hull F.C. in the 1983 Challenge Cup Final during the 1982–83 season at Wembley Stadium, London on Saturday 7 May 1983, in front of a crowd of 84,969.

=== Testimonial match ===
Siddall's benefit season at Featherstone Rovers took place during the 1989–90 season.
