= Lee Crooks (rugby league) =

English rugby league footballer and coach (born 1963)

Personal information
- Born: 18 September 1963 (age 62) Hull, East Riding of Yorkshire, England

Playing information
- Height: 6 ft 1 in (185 cm)
- Weight: 15 st 12 lb (101 kg)
- Position: Prop, Second-row
Club
| Years | Team | Pld | T | G | FG | P |
|---|---|---|---|---|---|---|
| 1980–87 | Hull FC | 208 | 44 | 389 | 11 | 947 |
| 1985–86 | Western Suburbs | 29 | 3 | 36 | 1 | 85 |
| 1987 | Balmain Tigers | 11 | 0 | 7 | 0 | 14 |
| 1987–90 | Leeds | 56 | 11 | 29 | 2 | 104 |
| 1990–97 | Castleford | 222 | 18 | 596 | 1 | 1265 |
| | Total | 526 | 76 | 1057 | 15 | 2415 |
Representative
| Years | Team | Pld | T | G | FG | P |
| 1985–91 | Yorkshire | 3 | 0 | 2 | 0 | 4 |
| 1992 | England | 1 | 1 | 4 | 0 | 12 |
| 1982–94 | Great Britain | 19 | 0 | 17 | 1 | 35 |

Coaching information
Club
| Years | Team | Gms | W | D | L | W% |
| 1998–99 | Keighley |
| 2000–01 | York |
| | Total | 0 | 0 | 0 | 0 |
Representative
| Years | Team | Gms | W | D | L | W% |
| 2013 | Serbia | 3 | 0 | 0 | 3 | 0 |
- Relatives: Ben Crooks (son); Steve Norton (brother-in-law)

Lee Crooks (born 18 September 1963) is an English former professional rugby league footballer who played in the 1980s and 1990s and coached in the 1990s, 2000s and 2010s. He played at representative level for Great Britain, England and Yorkshire and at club level for Hull FC, Western Suburbs Magpies, Balmain Tigers, Leeds and Castleford, as a prop or second-row, captain of Hull during the 1985–86 and 1986–87 seasons, and coached at representative level for Serbia, and at club level for Keighley and York.

== Background ==
Lee Crooks was born in Hull, East Riding of Yorkshire, England.

== Playing career ==
=== Club career ===
==== Hull FC ====
Crooks started his career at Hull FC, signing with the club in September 1980, on his 17th birthday. He made his debut in November 1980 against Salford, and went on to make 208 appearances for the club. He also played in three Challenge Cup Finals with the club.

Crooks first cup final was during the 1981–82 season, when he played second-row and scored four goals in Hull's 12–4 victory over Hull Kingston Rovers in the 1981–82 John Player Trophy Final at Headingley, Leeds on Saturday 23 January 1982. Crooks also appeared as a substitute (replacing second-row Mick Crane) in Hull's 14–14 draw with Widnes in the 1982 Challenge Cup Final at Wembley Stadium, London on Saturday 1 May 1982, in front of a crowd of 92,147, and started at second-row in the 18-9 victory over Widnes in the replay at Elland Road, Leeds on Wednesday 19 May 1982, in front of a crowd of 41,171.

During the 1982–83 season, Crooks played at second-row, and scored two goals and two drop goals in Hull's 18–7 victory over Bradford Northern in the 1982–83 Yorkshire Cup Final at Elland Road, Leeds on Saturday 2 October 1982, and played second-row in the 14–12 defeat by Featherstone Rovers in the 1983 Challenge Cup Final at Wembley Stadium, London on Saturday 7 May 1983, in front of a crowd of 84,969.

Crooks played second-row in the 13–2 victory over Castleford in the 1983–84 Yorkshire Cup Final during the 1983–84 season at Elland Road, Leeds on Saturday 15 October 1983.

In the 1984–85 season, Crooks played at prop in the 29–12 victory over Hull Kingston Rovers in the 1984–85 Yorkshire Cup Final at Boothferry Park, Hull on Saturday 27 October 1984, and played second-row in the 0–12 defeat by Hull Kingston Rovers in the 1984–85 John Player Special Trophy Final at Boothferry Park, Hull on Saturday 26 January 1985. At the end of the season, he played at prop, was captain, and scored two goals in the 24–28 defeat by Wigan in the 1985 Challenge Cup Final during the 1984–85 season at Wembley Stadium, London on Saturday 4 May 1985, in front of a crowd of 99,801, in what is regarded as the most marvellous cup final in living memory, which Hull narrowly lost after fighting back from 12–28 down at half-time.

Crooks played second-row, and scored four goals in the 24–31 defeat by Castleford in the 1986–87 Yorkshire Cup Final during the 1986–87 season at Headingley, Leeds on Saturday 11 October 1986.

==== Western Suburbs ====
While at Hull, Crooks spent the 1985 and 1986 NSWRL season with Western Suburbs Magpies. He scored a try on his debut against Penrith Panthers.

In 2010, Crooks was named in the Magpies Team of the Eighties.

==== Leeds ====
In June 1987, Crooks was sold to Leeds for a world record transfer fee of £150,000.

Crooks played prop in Leeds' 33–12 victory over Castleford in the 1988 Yorkshire Cup Final during the 1988–89 season at Elland Road, Leeds on Sunday 16 October 1988.

During his time at Leeds, Crooks struggled with off-the-field problems and was eventually transfer listed.

==== Castleford ====
In January 1990, Crooks was signed by Castleford for a fee of £150,000.

Crooks played at prop, scored a goal, and was captain in Castleford's 11–8 victory over Wakefield Trinity in the 1990 Yorkshire Cup Final during the 1990–91 season at Elland Road, Leeds on Sunday 23 September 1990. He missed out on the victory over Bradford Northern in the 1991 Yorkshire Cup Final due to a neck injury.

Crooks played at prop and was captain in Castleford's 12–28 defeat by Wigan in the 1992 Challenge Cup Final during the 1991–92 season at Wembley Stadium, London on Saturday 2 May 1992, in front of a crowd of 77,386.

He also played in Castleford's 33–2 victory over Wigan in the 1993–94 Regal Trophy Final during the 1993–94 season at Headingley, Leeds on Saturday 22 January 1994.

=== Representative honours ===
Crooks became the youngest ever Great Britain Test forward when he made his début aged 19 on Saturday 30 October 1982. Unfortunately his international début was soured as Australia sent shock waves through English football with a 40–4 win at Boothferry Park in Hull with Crooks providing Britain's only score with 2 penalty goals. He was selected to go on the 1988 Great Britain Lions tour.

Crooks won 19 caps for Great Britain while at Hull in 1982 against Australia (2 matches), in 1984 against France (sub), and Australia (2 matches), in 1985 against New Zealand, and New Zealand (sub), in 1986 against France (2 matches), and Australia (3 matches), in 1987 against France, while at Leeds in 1989 against France, while at Castleford in 1992 against France (2 matches), Papua New Guinea, and he was selected to go on the 1992 Great Britain Lions tour of Australia and New Zealand. He also played in 1994 against France.

Crooks also won a cap playing at prop for Yorkshire while at Castleford, scoring two goals in the 17-12 victory over Lancashire at Leeds' stadium on 18 September 1991.

Crooks won a cap for England while at Castleford in 1992 against Wales.

== Coaching career ==
He coached Serbia in their 2013 Rugby League World Cup qualifying campaign. In February 2014, Crooks joined the Rugby Football League (RFL) again this time in the role of England Regional Performance Coach for the North East. He will oversee the coaching at the RFL's North East Academy, as well as helping to develop community clubs in the region where he intends to build on the great work that was done by his predecessor Andy Kelly.

== Personal life ==
Crooks married aged 17, but got divorced in 1986. His second wife Karen is the sister of former Hull teammate, Steve Norton. He is the father of the rugby league footballer; Ben Crooks.

Achievements
| Preceded by Andy Gregory | Rugby League Transfer Record; Hull F.C. to Leeds; 1987 | Succeeded by Garry Schofield |
