= Steve Hankins =

English rugby league footballer

Personal information
- Full name: Stephen Hankins
- Born: second ¼ 1952 (age 72–73); Pontefract, West Riding of Yorkshire, England

Playing information
- Position: Prop, Second-row
Club
| Years | Team | Pld | T | G | FG | P |
|---|---|---|---|---|---|---|
| | Dewsbury |
| 1980–85 | Featherstone Rovers | 137 | 13 | 0 | 0 | 42 |
| | Bramley |
| | Total | 137 | 13 | 0 | 0 | 42 |
Representative
| Years | Team | Pld | T | G | FG | P |
| 1979 | Yorkshire | 2 | 0 | 0 | 0 | 0 |

Stephen Hankins (birth registered second ¼ 1952) is a former professional rugby league footballer who played as a prop or second-row. He played at club level for Dewsbury, Featherstone Rovers and Bramley, and also represented Yorkshire.

== Playing career ==
=== Featherstone Rovers ===
Hankins made his début for Featherstone Rovers on 3 February 1980. During his time at the club he made 137 appearances, scoring 13 tries.

Hankins played at prop in Featherstone Rovers' 14–12 victory over Hull F.C. in the 1983 Challenge Cup Final during the 1982–83 season at Wembley Stadium, London on 7 May 1983.

=== Yorkshire ===
Hankins played in both games for Yorkshire in the 1979–80 County Championship.
