= 1983–84 Yorkshire Cup =

- Structure: Regional knockout championship
- Teams: 16
- Winners: Hull F.C.
- Runners-up: Castleford

The 1983–84 Yorkshire Cup was the seventy-sixth occasion on which the Yorkshire Cup competition had been held. This season there were no junior/amateur clubs taking part, no new entrants and no "leavers" and so the total of entries remained the same at sixteen. This in turn resulted in no byes in the first round.

Hull F.C. won the trophy by beating Castleford by the score of 13–2 in the final. The match was played at Elland Road, Leeds, now in West Yorkshire. The attendance was 14,049 and receipts were £33,572. This is the second of three successive Yorkshire Cup final victories by Hull F.C. It is also the second time in the incredible eleven-year period in which Castleford. previously only once winners in 1977, will make eight appearances in the Yorkshire Cup final, winning on four and ending as runner-up on four occasions.

== Background ==
This season sixteen teams took part in the competition.

== Competition and results ==
=== Round 1 ===
Involved 8 matches (with no byes) and 16 clubs

Game No	Fixture Date	Home team	Score	Away team	Venue	Att	Rec	Notes	Ref
1	Sun 4 Sep 1983	Batley	14–30	Leeds	Mount Pleasant	2111			
2	Sun 4 Sep 1983	Bradford Northern	25–22	Hull Kingston Rovers	Odsal	4356			
3	Sun 4 Sep 1983	Castleford	36–20	Huddersfield	Wheldon Road	2499			
4	Sun 4 Sep 1983	Dewsbury	8–18	Keighley	Crown Flatt	518			
5	Sun 4 Sep 1983	Doncaster	16–12	Bramley	Bentley Road Stadium/Tattersfield	357			
6	Sun 4 Sep 1983	Hull F.C.	24–8	Featherstone Rovers	Boulevard	10168			
7	Sun 4 Sep 1983	Hunslet	11–21	York	Elland Road	1061			
8	Sun 4 Sep 1983	Wakefield Trinity	18–10	Halifax	Belle Vue	2195			

=== Round 2 - Quarter-finals ===
Involved 4 matches and 8 clubs

Game No	Fixture Date	Home team	Score	Away team	Venue	Att	Rec	Notes	Ref
1	Wed 14 Sep 1983	Bradford Northern	8–12	Castleford	Odsal	4684			
2	Wed 14 Sep 1983	Keighley	8–30	Hull F.C.	Lawkholme Lane	2503			
3	Wed 14 Sep 1983	Wakefield Trinity	32–14	Doncaster	Belle Vue	1587			
4	Wed 14 Sep 1983	York	16–24	Leeds	Clarence Street	1296			

=== Round 3 – Semi-finals ===
Involved 2 matches and 4 clubs

Game No	Fixture Date	Home team	Score	Away team	Venue	Att	Rec	Notes	Ref
1	Fri 23 Sep 1983	Wakefield Trinity	12–34	Castleford	Belle Vue	5592			
2	Wed 28 Sep 1983	Leeds	16–20	Hull F.C.	Headingley	10094			

=== Final ===
Game No	Fixture Date	Home team	Score	Away team	Venue	Att	Rec	Notes	Ref
	Saturday 15 October 1983	Hull F.C.	13–2	Castleford	Elland Road	14,049	£33,572	(Note: The venue is given as Headingley, Leeds by RUGBYLEAGUEproject but the Rothmans Rugby League Yearbook of 1991-92 and 1990-91 and the match programme show this to be Elland Road, Leeds) (Note: Elland Road, Leeds, is the home ground of Leeds United A.F.C. with a capacity of 37,914 (The record attendance was 57,892 set on 15 March 1967 for a cup match Leeds v Sunderland). The ground was originally established in 1897 by Holbeck RLFC who played there until their demise after the conclusion of the 1903-04 season)	

==== Teams and scorers ====
Hull F.C.	№	Castleford
	teams	
Gary Kemble	1	Darren Coen
Patrick Solal	2	Steve Fenton
Garry Schofield	3	Tony Marchant
James Leuluai	4	Gary Hyde
Dane O'Hara	5	John Kear
David Topliss (c)	6	John Joyner
Tony Dean	7	Bob Beardmore (c)
Phil Edmonds	8	Gary Connell
Ron Wileman	9	Stuart 'Corgi' Horton
Trevor Skerrett	10	Malcolm "Mal" Reilly
Wayne Proctor	11	Andrew Timson
Lee Crooks	12	Neil James
Mick Crane	13	Keith England
Fred Ah Kuoi	14	Ian Orum (for Gary Hyde)
Steve 'Knocker' Norton	15	Alan Hardy
Arthur Bunting	Coach	Malcolm "Mal" Reilly
13	score	2
4	HT	2
	Scorers	
	Tries	
Dane O'Hara (1)	T	
Wayne Proctor (1)	T	
Mick Crane (1)	T	
	Goals	
	G	Robert "Bob" Beardmore (1)
	Drop Goals	
Mick Crane (1)	DG	
Referee		Billy Thompson (Huddersfield)
White Rose Trophy for Man of the match		Mick Crane - Hull - loose forward
sponsored by		
Competition Sponsor		Philips Video

Scoring - Try = four points - Goal = two points - Drop goal = one point

=== The road to success ===
First round
Hunslet	11
York	21
Batley	14
Leeds	30
Dewsbury	8
Keighley	18
Hull F.C.	24
Featherstone Rovers	8
Wakefield Trinity	18
Halifax	10
Doncaster	16
Bramley	12
Bradford Northern	25
Hull Kingston Rovers	22
Castleford	36
Huddersfield	20

Second round
York	16
Leeds	24
Keighley	8
Hull F.C.	30
Wakefield Trinity	32
Doncaster	14
Bradford Northern	8
Castleford	12

Semi-finals
Leeds	16
Hull F.C.	20
Wakefield Trinity	12
Castleford	34

Final
Hull F.C.	13
Castleford	2

== See also ==
- 1983–84 Rugby Football League season
- Rugby league county cups
