= Dean Carroll =

English rugby league footballer

Personal information
- Born: 1962 Spen Valley district, England
- Died: 24 May 2015 (aged 52) Batley, West Yorkshire, England

Playing information
- Position: Fullback, Stand-off, Scrum-half
Club
Years	Team	Pld	T	G	FG	P
1980–83	Bradford Northern
1984–87	Carlisle
1989	→ Warrington (loan)	4	1	0	3	7
	Batley
1989–92	Doncaster	54	7	70	22	190
	Total	58	8	70	25	197

Dean Carroll (1962 – 24 May 2015) was an English professional rugby league footballer and cricketer who played in the 1980s and 1990s.

He played at club level for Bradford Northern, Carlisle, Warrington (loan), Batley and Doncaster, as a fullback, stand-off, or scrum-half, and coached at club level for West Bowling A.R.L.F.C. and Staincliffe ARLFC, and played cricket for Buttershaw St. Paul's Cricket Club. Having suffered a number of minor strokes in the past, he was found unconscious at home in Batley during the early-afternoon of Wednesday 19 May 2015, and he suffered heart attacks en route to Dewsbury and District Hospital, Dewsbury before being transferred to Pinderfields Hospital, Wakefield, having suffered cerebral hypoxia. Never regaining consciousness, life support was removed on Saturday 23 May 2015, and he died during the morning of Sunday 24 May 2015.

== Background ==
Carroll was born in Spen Valley West Riding of Yorkshire, England.

== Playing career ==
=== County Cup Final appearances ===
Dean Carroll played scrum-half, and scored a goal, and a 2-drop goals in Bradford Northern's 7–18 defeat by Hull F.C. in the 1982–83 Yorkshire Cup Final during the 1982–83 season at Elland Road, Leeds on Saturday 2 October 1982.

=== Club career ===
Dean Carroll initially played rugby league for St John Fisher Catholic School, and Batley Boys ARLFC before joining Bradford Northern. He made his début for Bradford Northern against Blackpool Borough in 1980. Following the arrival of Wales international rugby union scrum-half Terry Holmes from Cardiff RFC in 1985, Dean Carroll felt his first-team opportunities at Bradford Northern would be limited, and consequently he transferred to Carlisle. In hindsight, the number of injuries sustained by Terry Holmes would actually have meant more opportunities at Bradford Northern than Dean Carroll had envisaged. He made his début for Warrington on Sunday 5 March 1989, and he played his last match for Warrington on Sunday 16 April 1989.

== Outside of rugby league ==
Dean Carroll was a pupil at St Mary's Catholic Primary School in Batley and St John Fisher Catholic School in Dewsbury, during his working life he was employed at Fox's Biscuits, Batley. Dean Carroll's funeral took place St Mary of the Angels Roman Catholic Church at 10 a.m. on Wednesday 3 June 2015, followed by interment at Batley Cemetery, and a reception at Staincliffe Cricket & Working Mens Club.

== Genealogical information ==
Dean had a son Paul, and three grandchildren, he was the younger brother of Linda Carroll (birth registered during first ¼ 1959 (age 66–67) in Spen Valley district), the rugby league footballer for Bramley, and coach for Dewsbury Celtic ARLFC, Stephen "Steve" Carroll (birth registered during fourth ¼ 1960 (age 65–66) in Spen Valley district), the older brother of James Carroll (birth registered during first ¼ 1966 (age 59–60) in Spen Valley district), and the cousin of the rugby league footballer for Leeds, Halifax and Hull FC, John Carroll.
