= Tony Dean (rugby league) =

English RL coach and former rugby league footballer

Personal information
- Full name: Anthony Dean
- Born: second 1/4 1949 Pontefract district, England
- Died: 18 July 2014 (aged 65) Pontefract, England

Playing information
- Position: Scrum-half, Loose forward
Club
Years	Team	Pld	T	G	FG	P
1969–73	Castleford	30	9	3		33
1973–≥73	Batley
1980	Hunslet	16	3	0	0	9
1981–84	Hull FC	61	14	0	9	52
1984	Rochdale Hornets	18	4	0	1	17
	Total	125	30	3	10	111

Coaching information
Club
Years	Team	Gms	W	D	L	W%
1986–86	Wakefield Trinity	32	4	2	26	13
1988	Hull FC	8	4	1	3	50
	Total	40	8	3	29	20

Tony Dean (second 1/4 1949 – 18 July 2014) was an English professional rugby league footballer who played in the 1960s, 1970s and 1980s, and coached in the 1980s. He played at club level for Castleford, Batley, Hunslet, Hull FC and Rochdale Hornets, as a scrum-half, or loose forward, and coached at club level for Wakefield Trinity and Hull F.C. (Joint Head Coach with Keith Hepworth).

== Background ==
Tony Dean's birth was registered in Pontefract, West Riding of Yorkshire, England, he died aged 65 of cancer in Prince of Wales hospice, Pontefract, West Yorkshire, his funeral service took place at St Cuthbert's Church, Cross Hill, Ackworth at 1pm on Friday 1 August 2014, followed by a reception at The Frog and Moose, Wakefield Road, Ackworth.

== Playing career ==
=== Challenge Cup Final appearances ===
Tony Dean played scrum-half (Kevin Harkin having played in the first match) in Hull FC's 18–9 victory over Widnes in the 1982 Challenge Cup Final replay during the 1981–82 season at Elland Road, Leeds on Wednesday 19 May 1982, in front of a crowd of 41,171.

=== County Cup Final appearances ===
Tony Dean played scrum-half in Hull FC's 13–2 victory over Castleford in the 1983 Yorkshire Cup Final during the 1983–84 season at Elland Road, Leeds on Saturday 15 October 1983.

=== John Player Trophy Final appearances ===
Tony Dean played scrum-half (replaced by substitute Kevin Harkin), and scored a drop goal in Hull FC's 12–4 victory over Hull Kingston Rovers in the 1981–82 John Player Trophy Final during the 1981–82 season at Headingley, Leeds on Saturday 23 January 1982.

== Playing career ==
Tony Dean was the coach of Wakefield Trinity from June 1986 to December 1986, and he was the coach of Hull F.C. (Joint Head Coach with Keith Hepworth) during 1988.
