= John Marsden (rugby league) =

English rugby league footballer

Personal information
- Full name: John L. Marsden
- Born: 28 January 1953 (age 73) Pontefract, England

Playing information
- Position: Fullback, Wing
Club
Years	Team	Pld	T	G	FG	P
1974–85	Featherstone Rovers	130+27	23	0	0	69

John L. Marsden (28 January 1953) is an English former professional rugby league footballer who played in the 1970s and 1980s. He played at club level for Featherstone Rovers, as a fullback or wing.

== Playing career ==
Marsden made his début for Featherstone Rovers on Monday 25 March 1974.

=== Challenge Cup Final appearances ===
Marsden played on the wing in Featherstone Rovers' 14–12 victory over Hull F.C. in the 1983 Challenge Cup Final during the 1982–83 season at Wembley Stadium, London on Saturday 7 May 1983, in front of a crowd of 84,969.

=== County Cup Final appearances ===
Marsden played fullback in Featherstone Rovers' 7–17 defeat by Castleford in the 1977 Yorkshire Cup Final during the 1977–78 season at Headingley, Leeds on Saturday 15 October 1977.

=== Testimonial match ===
Marsden's benefit season at Featherstone Rovers took place during the 1983–84 season.
