= John Gilbert (rugby league) =

English rugby league footballer

Personal information
- Full name: John Gilbert

Playing information
- Position: Wing, Centre
Club
Years	Team	Pld	T	G	FG	P
1977–85	Featherstone Rovers	240	80	0	0	253
1985–87	Widnes	23	5	0	0	20
1987	Featherstone Rovers	3	0	0	0	0
	Total	266	85	0	0	273
Representative
Years	Team	Pld	T	G	FG	P
1977–81	Great Britain U24	3	1	0	0	3

John Gilbert is a former professional rugby league footballer who played in the 1970s and 1980s. He played at club level for Featherstone Rovers and Widnes, as a wing or centre.

== Playing career ==
=== Club career ===
Gilbert made his début for Featherstone Rovers on Sunday 2 January 1977, during his time at Featherstone Rovers he scored sixty-seven 3-point tries, and thirteen 4-point tries.

Gilbert played at centre (replaced by substitute Paul Lyman, following an illegal high-tackle by Paul Rose who received a 10-minute sin-bin) in Featherstone Rovers' 14–12 victory over Hull F.C. in the 1983 Challenge Cup Final during the 1982–83 season at Wembley Stadium, London on Saturday 7 May 1983, in front of a crowd of 84,969.

=== Representative honours ===
Gilbert played at centre in Featherstone Rovers' 7–17 defeat by Castleford in the 1977 Yorkshire Cup Final during the 1977–78 season at Headingley, Leeds on Saturday 15 October 1977.
