= Raymond Handscombe =

English rugby league footballer

Ray Handscombe
Personal information
- Full name: Raymond Handscombe
- Born: first ¼ 1950 (age 74–75) Lower Agbrigg district, England

Playing information
- Position: Hooker
Club
Years	Team	Pld	T	G	FG	P
1968–74	Leeds	19	2	0	0	6
1974–78	Wakefield Trinity	132	16	0	2	49
1978–85	Featherstone Rovers	127	15	0	0	45
	Total	278	33	0	2	100

Raymond "Ray" Handscombe (birth registered first ¼ 1950) is an English former professional rugby league footballer who played in the 1970s and 1980s. He played at club level for Leeds, Wakefield Trinity, and Featherstone Rovers, as a hooker.

== Playing career ==
=== Wakefield Trinity ===
Handscombe made his début for Wakefield Trinity during September 1974, he played his last match for Wakefield Trinity during the 1978–79 season,.

Handscombe played hooker in Wakefield Trinity's 13-16 defeat by Hull Kingston Rovers in the 1974 Yorkshire Cup Final during the 1974–75 season at Headingley, Leeds on Saturday 26 October 1974.

=== Featherstone Rovers ===
Handscombe made his début for Featherstone Rovers on Sunday 29 October 1978, during his time at Featherstone Rovers he scored 30 tries, and he played his last match for Featherstone Rovers during the 1984–85 season.

Handscombe played hooker in Featherstone Rovers' 14-12 victory over Hull F.C. in the 1983 Challenge Cup Final during the 1982–83 season at Wembley Stadium, London on Saturday 7 May 1983, in front of a crowd of 84,969.
