= Mick Crane =

GB international rugby league footballer (1952–2022)

Personal information
- Full name: Michael Crane
- Born: 30 September 1952 Hull, United Kingdom
- Died: 2 July 2022 (aged 69) Hull, United Kingdom

Playing information
- Position: Centre, Second-row, Loose forward
Club
Years	Team	Pld	T	G	FG	P
1970–77	Hull FC
1977–79	Leeds
1979–81	Hull Kingston Rovers	15+3	4	0	0	12
1981–85	Hull FC	310
1986–87	Hull FC	14
	Total	342	4	0	0	12
Representative
Years	Team	Pld	T	G	FG	P
1982	Great Britain	1	0	0	0	0

Michael Crane (30 September 1952 – 2 July 2022) was an English professional rugby league footballer who played in the 1970s and 1980s. He played at representative level for Great Britain, and at club level for Hull F.C. (three times), Leeds and Hull Kingston Rovers, as a centre, Second-row, or loose forward.

== Biography ==
=== Hull ===
Crane made his début for Hull FC in 1970. Crane played loose forward, and scored two tries in Hull FC's 13–19 defeat by Widnes in the 1975–76 Player's No.6 Trophy Final during the 1975–76 season at Headingley, Leeds on Saturday 24 January 1976.

=== Leeds and Hull KR ===
Crane was transferred from Hull FC to Leeds in December 1977 for a fee of £12,000. Crane played loose forward in Leeds' 14–12 victory over St. Helens in the 1977–78 Challenge Cup Final during the 1977–78 season at Wembley Stadium, London on Saturday 13 May 1978. In November 1979 he moved to Hull Kingston Rovers for a transfer fee of £9,000.

=== Return to Hull ===
Crane played loose forward in Hull Kingston Rovers' 7–8 defeat by Leeds in the 1980–81 Yorkshire Cup Final during the 1980–81 season at Fartown Ground, Huddersfield on Saturday 8 November 1980.

During the 1981–82 season, Crane played at second-row in the 12–4 victory over Hull Kingston Rovers in the 1981–82 John Player Trophy Final at Headingley, Leeds on Saturday 23 January 1982, played at second-row in Hull's 14–14 draw with Widnes in the 1981–82 Challenge Cup Final at Wembley Stadium, London on Saturday 1 May 1982, and appeared as a substitute (replacing Loose forward Steve Norton) in the 18–9 victory over Widnes in the 1981–82 Challenge Cup Final replay at Elland Road, Leeds on Wednesday 19 May 1982.

He played loose forward, (replaced by substitute Steve "Knocker" Norton) in the 18–7 victory over Bradford Northern in the 1982–83 Yorkshire Cup Final during the 1982–83 season at Elland Road, Leeds on Saturday 2 October 1982, and played loose forward, scored a try, and a drop goal, and was man of the match winning the White Rose Trophy in the 13–2 victory over Castleford in the 1983–84 Yorkshire Cup Final during the 1983–84 season at Elland Road, Leeds on Saturday 15 October 1983.

=== International career ===
Crane won a cap for Great Britain while at Hull in the 8–32 defeat by Australia at Headingley, Leeds on Sunday 28 November 1982.
