= Paul Lyman =

English rugby league footballer

Personal information
- Full name: Paul Lyman
- Born: 24 May 1965 (age 60); Wakefield, England

Playing information
- Height: 6 ft 0 in (1.83 m)
- Weight: 14 st 7 lb (92 kg)
- Position: Second-row, Loose forward
Club
Years	Team	Pld	T	G	FG	P
1983–88	Featherstone Rovers	159	62	0	0	247
1988–93	Hull Kingston Rovers	94	39	0	0	156
	Total	253	101	0	0	403
Representative
Years	Team	Pld	T	G	FG	P
1985–86	Yorkshire	3	1	0	0	4
1985–86	Great Britain U-21	3	0	0	0	0

Paul Lyman (born 24 May 1965) is an English former professional rugby league footballer who played in the 1980s and 1990s. He played at representative level for Yorkshire, and at club level for Featherstone Rovers and Hull Kingston Rovers, as a second-row, or loose forward.

== Background ==
Paul Lyman was born in Wakefield, West Riding of Yorkshire, England.

== Playing career ==
=== Club career ===
Lyman made his début for Featherstone Rovers on Sunday 21 November 1982, during his time at Featherstone Rovers he scored one 3-point try, and sixty-one 4-point tries. Lyman appeared as a substitute (replacing centre, John Gilbert) in Featherstone Rovers' 14-12 victory over Hull F.C. in the 1983 Challenge Cup Final during the 1982–83 season at Wembley Stadium, London on Saturday 7 May 1983, in front of a crowd of 84,969.

In January 1989, Lyman was transferred to Hull Kingston Rovers in a part-exchange deal, with Featherstone Rovers receiving Chris Burton and a £55,000 fee.

=== International honours ===
Lyman played for Great Britain Under-21s, and was selected for the Great Britain squad against Australia in the 1986 Kangaroo tour of Great Britain and France, but ultimately he was not selected to play in any of the test matches
