= Gary Van Bellen =

English rugby league footballer

Personal information
- Full name: Gary R. Van Bellen
- Born: fourth ¼ 1957 (age 67–68); Huddersfield district, England

Playing information
- Position: Prop, Second-row
Club
Years	Team	Pld	T	G	FG	P
1980–85	Bradford Northern	151	21	0	0	67
1985	Leigh	14	0	0	0	0
1985	Hunslet	6	0	0	0	0
1985–86	Bradford Northern	19	0	0	0	0
1986	Barrow	10	2	0	0	8
1986–89	Wakefield Trinity	38	2	0	0	8
1988–90	Sheffield Eagles	40	0	0	0	0
1990–91	Dewsbury	15	0	0	0	0
1991–92	Scarborough Pirates	9	0	0	0	0
	Total	302	25	0	0	83
Representative
Years	Team	Pld	T	G	FG	P
1980–82	Great Britain U-24	2	0	0	0	0
1982	Yorkshire	2	0	0	0	0
- Relatives: Ian Van Bellen (brother)

Gary R. Van Bellen (fourth ¼ 1957) is an English former professional rugby league footballer who played in the 1980s and 1990s. He played at club level for Bradford Northern (two spells), Hunslet, Leigh, Wakefield Trinity, and the Sheffield Eagles, as a prop, or second-row.

== Background ==
Gary Van Bellen's birth was registered in Huddersfield, West Riding of Yorkshire, England.

== Playing career ==
=== County Cup Final appearances ===
Gary Van Bellen played at second-row (replaced by substitute Dick Jasiewicz) in Bradford Northern's 5-10 defeat by Castleford in the 1981 Yorkshire Cup Final during the 1981–82 season at Headingley, Leeds on Saturday 3 October 1981, and played at prop in the 7-18 defeat by Hull F.C. in the 1982 Yorkshire Cup Final during the 1981–82 season at Elland Road, Leeds on Saturday 2 October 1982.

=== John Player Trophy Final appearances ===
Gary Van Bellen played at second-row (replaced by substitute Steve Ferres) in Bradford Northern's 6-0 victory over Widnes in the 1979–80 John Player Trophy Final during the 1979–80 season at Headingley, Leeds on Saturday 5 January 1980.

=== Club career ===
Gary Van Bellen made his début for Bradford Northern against York at Clarence Street, York, he played, and scored a try in Bradford Northern's 6-11 defeat by Featherstone Rovers in the 1982–83 Challenge Cup semi-final during the 1982–83 season at Headingley, Leeds on Saturday 26 March 1983, he made his début for Leigh during the 1984–85 season, he played his last match for Leigh during the 1984–85 season, he made his début for Wakefield Trinity during February 1987, and he played his last match for Wakefield Trinity during the 1988–89 season.

== Genealogical information ==
Gary Van Bellen is the younger brother of Colin J. Van Bellen (birth registered second ¼ 1942 (age 82–83) in Huddersfield district), and Victor T. Van Bellen (birth registered first ¼ 1944 (age 80–81) in Huddersfield district), and the rugby league footballer; Ian Van Bellen.
