= Dick Jasiewicz =

GB international rugby league footballer

Personal information
- Full name: Richard Jasiewicz
- Born: 27 April 1958 (age 67) Batley, West Riding of Yorkshire, England

Playing information
- Position: Second-row, Loose forward
Club
Years	Team	Pld	T	G	FG	P
1980–87	Bradford Northern	174	44	0	0	161
≤1987–≥87	Wakefield Trinity	16	5	0	0	20
≤1991–≥91	Doncaster
	Total	190	49	0	0	181
Representative
Years	Team	Pld	T	G	FG	P
1984	Great Britain	1	0	0	0	0

Richard Jasiewicz (born 27 April 1958) is an English former professional rugby league footballer who played in the 1980s and 1990s. He played at representative level for Great Britain, and at club level for Bradford Northern, Wakefield Trinity and Doncaster, as a second-row, or loose forward.

== Background ==
Dick Jasiewicz's birth was registered in Spen Valley, West Riding of Yorkshire, England.

== Playing career ==
=== International honours ===
Dick Jasiewicz won a cap for Great Britain while at Bradford Northern in 1984 against France.

=== County Cup Final appearances ===
Dick Jasiewicz played as a substitute (replacing second-row Gary Van Bellen) in Bradford Northern's 5-10 defeat by Castleford in the 1981 Yorkshire Cup Final during the 1981–82 season at Headingley, Leeds on Saturday 3 October 1981, and played at second-row in the 7-18 defeat by Hull F.C. in the 1982 Yorkshire Cup Final during the 1981–82 season at Elland Road, Leeds on Saturday 2 October 1982.

== Outside of rugby league ==
Dick Jasiewicz ran Dickies Gym, 1st Floor, Hickwell Mills, Hick Lane, Batley, which was used by professional boxer Josh Warrington, as of 2018 he lives in Thailand for 9-months of the year.
