= Nigel Barker (rugby league) =

English former professional rugby league player

Personal information
- Full name: Nigel R. Barker
- Born: fourth ¼ 1955 (age 69–70); Pontefract district, England

Playing information
- Position: Fullback
Club
Years	Team	Pld	T	G	FG	P
1981–88/89	Featherstone Rovers	167+20	28	0	0	100

Nigel Barker (birth registered fourth 1/4 1955) is an English former professional rugby league footballer who played in the 1970s and 1980s. He played at club level for Featherstone Miners' Welfare ARLFC, and Featherstone Rovers, as a fullback.

== Background ==
Nigel Barker's birth was registered in Pontefract district, West Riding of Yorkshire, England.

== Playing career ==
Barker made his début for Featherstone Rovers on Sunday 25 January 1981, during his time at Featherstone Rovers he scored twelve 3-point tries, and sixteen 4-point tries.

=== Challenge Cup Final appearances ===
Barker played fullback in Featherstone Rovers' 14–12 victory over Hull F.C. in the 1983 Challenge Cup Final during the 1982–83 season at Wembley Stadium, London on Saturday 7 May 1983, in front of a crowd of 84,969.

=== Testimonial match ===
Barker's benefit season at Featherstone Rovers took place during the 1991–92 season.
