= Bellens =

Bellens is a surname. Notable people with the surname include:

- Didier Bellens (1955–2016), Belgian businessman
- Jacob Bellens (born 1979), Danish rock band member
- Rita Bellens (born 1962), Belgian politician

== See also ==
- Bellen (surname)
