= James Leuluai =

New Zealand international rugby league footballer and coach

Personal information
- Full name: A'au James Leuluai
- Born: 4 February 1957 (age 69) Auckland, New Zealand

Playing information
- Position: Centre
Club
Years	Team	Pld	T	G	FG	P
	Mt Wellington
1985	Manly Sea Eagles	7	0	0	0	0
1985–88	Hull FC	180	84	0	0	305
1986(loan)–87	→Leigh	25	6	0	0	24
1987–??	Petone
1988–90	Wakefield Trinity	52	12	0	0	48
1990	Doncaster RLFC	13	1	0	0	4
1990	Ryedale-York	7	2	0	0	8
	Total	284	105	0	0	389
Representative
Years	Team	Pld	T	G	FG	P
1979–80	Auckland	5	1	0	0	3
1980	New Zealand Māori	1	1	0	0	3
1979–86	New Zealand	29	14	0	0	51
1987–??	Wellington
1987	Central Districts

Coaching information
Club
Years	Team	Gms	W	D	L	W%
1994	Wellington City	22	8	0	14	36
- Relatives: Phillip Leuluai (brother); Thomas Leuluai (son); Macgraff Leuluai (son); Kylie Leuluai (nephew); Marley Leuluai (great nephew)

A'au James Leuluai (born 4 February 1957) is a New Zealand former international rugby league centre.

== Background ==
He is the father of former Widnes Vikings player Macgraff Leuluai and Wigan Warriors and New Zealand international Thomas Leuluai, and the uncle of former Leeds Rhinos prop Kylie Leuluai. He is of Samoan descent.

== Playing career ==
A Mt Wellington junior, in his career Leuluai played for the Manly-Warringah Sea Eagles, Wakefield Trinity, Hull FC, Leigh, Ryedale-York and Doncaster. Leuluai also represented the New Zealand national rugby league team and New Zealand Māori. Between 1979 and 1986 he played in 29 test matches for New Zealand.

His Hull FC début, alongside fellow débutant Dane O'Hara and Gary Kemble (who had already appeared) came on 27 September 1981 against Castleford. Achievements over the next year included helping Hull to win the John Player Trophy, also being Premiership runners-up, and of course to lift the 1982 Challenge Cup, the first time the Challenge Cup had been back at the Boulevard since 1914.

A'au James Leuluai was an unused interchange/substitute in Hull FC's 14–14 draw with Widnes in the 1982 Challenge Cup Final during the 1981–82 season at Wembley Stadium, London on Saturday 1 May 1982, in front of a crowd of 92,147, and played at centre (Terry Day having played centre in the first match) in the 18–9 victory over Widnes in the 1982 Challenge Cup Final replay during the 1981–82 season at Elland Road, Leeds on Wednesday 19 May 1982, in front of a crowd of 41,171,

Nicknamed "Lullaby", as he so often fell asleep off the field he was anything but sleepy on it, scoring many remarkable tries including what the Yorkshire Post described as "one of the greatest solo tries of all time" in the 1983 Challenge Cup semi-final victory over Castleford, passing four Castleford players and racing around half of the length of the field without a hand ever touching him until he had crossed the line.

Leuluai played at centre and scored 2-tries in Hull FC's 24–28 defeat by Wigan in the 1985 Challenge Cup Final during the 1984–85 season at Wembley Stadium, London on Saturday 4 May 1985, in front of a crowd of 99,801, in what is regarded as the most marvellous cup final in living memory, which Hull narrowly lost after fighting back from 12 to 28 down at half-time.

Leuluai played at centre in Hull FC's 18–7 victory over Bradford Northern in the 1982 Yorkshire Cup Final during the 1982–83 season at Elland Road, Leeds on Saturday 2 October 1982, played at centre in the 13–2 victory over Castleford in the 1983 Yorkshire Cup Final during the 1983–84 season at Elland Road, Leeds on Saturday 15 October 1983, and played on the wing in the 29–12 victory over Hull Kingston Rovers in the 1984 Yorkshire Cup Final during the 1984–85 season at Boothferry Park, Kingston upon Hull on Saturday 27 October 1984.

Leuluai played at centre in Hull FC's 12–4 victory over Hull Kingston Rovers in the 1981–82 John Player Trophy Final during the 1981–82 season at Headingley, Leeds on Saturday 23 January 1982, played at centre in the 12–0 victory over Hull Kingston Rovers in the 1984–85 John Player Special Trophy Final during the 1984–85 season at Boothferry Park, Kingston upon Hull on Saturday 26 January 1985.

In 1986/7, after failing to agree a new contract with Hull he was transfer listed at £50,000. "Jimmy" subsequently played 6 games on loan to Leigh before returning to the Boulevard for 3 more games and a further 27 in 1987 / 88. In October 1988 he then signed for Wakefield Trinity, making his début in the 12–34 defeat by Wigan at Central Park, Wigan, playing 51 times over 2 seasons and scoring 12 tries. In 1990/91 he moved to Ryedale-York, playing 7 matches and scoring 2 tries before ending his UK career at Doncaster the same year with 13 games and 1 try. His last match on UK soil was a Doncaster home game to Leigh on 14 April 1991, played in front of just 1,557, a rather sad end to a great Rugby League career

Such was their subsequent commitment to the British game that Leuluai, and his Hull counterparts Gary Kemble & Dane O'Hara (Fred Ah Kuoi had served 4 years with the Club at this point and so would not be eligible until the following year), saw the Government & Rugby Football League change rules and by laws regarding overseas players in 1986 to take those who had shown such commitment outside of the overseas player quotas.

After he had finished his English career, Leuluai returned to New Zealand and started playing for Wellington. He helped them defeat Auckland for the first time in 75 years. It was during this time in Wellington that Leuluai began his coaching career.

== Coaching career ==
Leuluai was the coach of the Wellington City Dukes in the 1994 Lion Red Cup.

During the early seasons of the Bartercard Cup, Leuluai was the coach of the Eastern Tornadoes. He later took on the role of the Junior Kiwis in 2002.

Between 2003 and 2005 Leuluai was one of Daniel Andersons two assistant coaches with the New Zealand national rugby league team.

After a career of coaching New Zealand representative sides, Leuluai applied for the head coaching job of the New Zealand national rugby league team in 2005 and was heavily favoured to be appointed until he withdrew for personal reasons. Brian McClennan was appointed coach instead.

In July 2007 Leuluai again applied to coach the New Zealand Kiwis but ultimately Gary Kemble was appointed coach. Leuluai served as assistant under Kemble.

In 2011 Leuluai co-coached the Mangere East Hawks in the Auckland Rugby League competition.
