= Bellen (surname) =

Bellen is a Germanic surname that may refer to

- Aleksander von der Bellen (1859–1924), Russian politician and nobleman
- Alexander Van der Bellen (born 1944), Austrian politician and economist, grandson of Aleksander
- Ian Van Bellen (born 1945), British rugby league footballer
- Gary Van Bellen (born 1957), British rugby league footballer, brother of Ian
- Hugo J. Bellen (born 1953), American geneticist
- Joost van Bellen (born 1962), Dutch electro DJ and event organizer
- Martine Bellen, American poet, editor and librettist
