= John Crossley Jr. =

English cricketer and rugby league footballer

John Crossley
Personal information
- Born: 6 October 1956 (age 70) Castleford, West Riding of Yorkshire, England

Playing information
- Position: Wing, Stand-off, Scrum-half
Club
Years	Team	Pld	T	G	FG	P
1977–77	Wakefield Trinity	2	1	0	0	3
1978–79	→ Castleford (loan)	7	3	0	0	9
1979–81	York	127	59	6	1	192
1981–84	Fulham RLFC	91	48	0	0	150
1984–86	Bradford Northern
1985–86	Halifax
1986–89	Featherstone Rovers	43+23	18	0	0	72
	Total	293	129	6	1	426

John Crossley (born 16 October 1956) is an English cricketer, and professional rugby league footballer who played in the 1970s and 1980s. He played club level cricket for Fairburn Cricket Club, as a wicket-keeper, and club level rugby league (RL) for Wakefield Trinity, Castleford (loan), York, Lock Lane ARLFC, Fulham R.L.F.C., Bradford Northern, Halifax and Featherstone Rovers, as a wing, stand-off, or scrum-half.

== Background ==
John Crossley was born in Castleford, West Riding of Yorkshire, England.

== Playing career ==
=== Championship appearances ===
John Crossley scored a club record 35 tries for York Wasps in 1980/81 when they won the Championship Second Division title during the 1980–81 Rugby Football League season.

John Crossley played in Halifax's victory in Championship during the 1985–86 season.

=== Rugby League Premiership Final appearances ===
John Crossley played in Halifax's 10-38 defeat by Warrington in the 1985–86 Rugby League Premiership Final during the 1985–86 season at Elland Road, Leeds, on Sunday 18 May 1986.

=== County Cup Final appearances ===
John Crossley appeared as a substitute (replacing Centre Terry Day) in York's 8-18 defeat by Bradford Northern in the 1978 Yorkshire Cup Final during the 1978–79 season at Headingley, Leeds, on Saturday 28 October 1978, in front of crowd of 10,429.

=== Notable tour matches ===
John Crossley played stand-off in Fulham R.L.F.C.'s 5-22 defeat by Australia in the 1982 Kangaroo tour of Great Britain and France tour match during the 1982–83 season at Craven Cottage, Fulham, London, on Sunday 14 November 1982, in front of crowd of 10,432.

=== Club career ===
John Crossley made his début for York on Sunday 21 August 1977, and holds York's tries in a season record with 35 tries scored during the 1980–81 season, he made his début for Featherstone Rovers on Sunday 23 November 1986.

== Honoured at York ==
John Crossley is a York 'Hall of Fame' inductee.

== Genealogical information ==
John Crossley is the son of the rugby league footballer who played in the 1950s for Castleford and Lock Lane ARLFC; John Crossley Sr.
