= Gary Kemble =

New Zealand international rugby league footballer and coach

Personal information
- Full name: Gary Edward Kemble
- Born: 23 August 1956 (age 70)

Playing information
- Position: Fullback
Club
Years	Team	Pld	T	G	FG	P
1977–78	New Hunslet	22	6	2	0	22
1981–87	Hull FC	195	45	1	0	162
	Total	217	51	3	0	184
Representative
Years	Team	Pld	T	G	FG	P
1977–81	Auckland	10	0	2	0	4
1980–86	New Zealand	19	1	0	0	4
1981	New Zealand Māori	1	0	0	0	0

Coaching information
Club
Years	Team	Gms	W	D	L	W%
1993	Northcote
1994–95	Hawke's Bay
	Total	0	0	0	0
Representative
Years	Team	Gms	W	D	L	W%
2007	New Zealand	5	1	0	4	20

Gary Edward Kemble (born 23 August 1956), also known by the nickname "Crayfish", is a New Zealand rugby league coach and former player. He has both played and coached the New Zealand national rugby league team. He is the current head coach of the Papakura Sea Eagles in the Auckland Rugby League.

== Playing career ==
An Ellerslie club member, Kemble debuted for Auckland in 1976, aged only 19. He then played rugby league at a senior level throughout the 1970s and 1980s, also playing for the Papakura club. His career included a first stint in the UK as a young unknown for New Hunslet in the 1977–78 season. After a successful tour with New Zealand in 1980 however he came to far greater prominence, beginning a lengthy stint with English club Hull FC during a golden period for the club. Debuting v Wakefield Trinity on 30 August 1981, achievements over the next year included; helping Hull to win the John Player Trophy, also being Premiership runners-up, he had taken Man of the Match in the Challenge Cup semi-final, scoring a 50-yard try rated as the best solo effort of the season, and lifting the Challenge Cup, the first time the Challenge Cup had been back at the Boulevard since 1914.

Gary Kemble played fullback in Hull FC's 14–14 draw with Widnes in the 1982 Challenge Cup Final during the 1981–82 season at Wembley Stadium, London on Saturday 1 May 1982, in front of a crowd of 92,147, and played fullback, and scored a try in the 18–9 victory over Widnes in the 1982 Challenge Cup Final replay during the 1981–82 season at Elland Road, Leeds on Wednesday 19 May 1982, in front of a crowd of 41,171, and played fullback in the 24–28 defeat by Wigan in the 1985 Challenge Cup Final during the 1984–85 season at Wembley Stadium, London on Saturday 4 May 1985, in front of a crowd of 99,801, in what is regarded as the most marvellous cup final in living memory, which Hull narrowly lost after fighting back from 12 to 28 down at half-time.

Kemble initially played for Hull alongside his future Kiwi assistant coach James Leuluai, and New Zealand Captain Dane O'Hara (from 1981) and they were later joined by another New Zealand Captain in Fred Ah Kuoi (from 1983). They were amongst the first large group of New Zealand rugby league players to play their professional rugby league in England and such was their subsequent commitment to the British game that in 1986 the British Government & Rugby Football League changed rules and by laws regarding overseas players to take those who had shown such commitment outside of the overseas player quotas. Kemble played fullback in Hull FC's 18–7 victory over Bradford Northern in the 1982 Yorkshire Cup Final during the 1982–83 season at Elland Road, Leeds on Saturday 2 October 1982, played fullback in the 13–2 victory over Castleford in the 1983 Yorkshire Cup Final during the 1983–84 season at Elland Road, Leeds on Saturday 15 October 1983, played fullback, and scored 2-tries in the 29–12 victory over Hull Kingston Rovers in the 1984 Yorkshire Cup Final during the 1984–85 season at Boothferry Park, Kingston upon Hull on Saturday 27 October 1984, and played fullback in the 24–31 defeat by Castleford in the 1986 Yorkshire Cup Final during the 1986–87 season at Headingley, Leeds on Saturday 11 October 1986. Kemble played fullback in Hull FC's 0–12 defeat by Hull Kingston Rovers in the 1984–85 John Player Special Trophy Final during the 1984–85 season at Boothferry Park, Kingston upon Hull on Saturday 26 January 1985. He made 19 test appearances for the New Zealand national rugby league team and played 195 times for Hull F.C. (inc. 5 as sub), scoring 45 tries and 1 goal for 162 points In 1986, as Hull F.C. had hit harder financial times, and had been forced to sell Lee Crooks to Leeds, Kemble and Hull F.C. were unable to agree new contract terms, and a good (non-Rugby) job having been offered to him back home. He was listed at £40,000 with initial interest from Leeds in either a purchase or a short-term loan agreement (such as Leigh had agreed for James Leuluai the year before) and then further talk of him possibly returning from New Zealand to play for Salford in a swap deal for Paul Fletcher (who did subsequently join Hull F.C.) In the end it all came to nothing and Kemble's next return to Hull was 20 years later (alongside Dane, Fred, James and Australians Peter Sterling and John Muggleton) to reunite the 1985 challenge cup squad at a 21st anniversary dinner at Hull FC's KC stadium. After 5 great seasons with Hull FC, Gary Kemble therefore returned home to New Zealand subsequently establishing a successful coaching career.

== Coaching career ==
Kemble coached the Northcote Tigers in 1993 before being appointed the coach of the Hawkes Bay Unicorns in the new Lion Red Cup. During the 1995 World Cup he served as an assistant coach to the New Zealand national rugby league team.

In April 1997 he was made the Auckland Warriors reserve grade coach, replacing Frank Endacott who had been appointed head coach. The team made the Grand Final but lost to the Bulldogs.

During this time Kemble held a number of representative coaching posts, including the Junior Kiwis in 1994, then the New Zealand Residents and New Zealand "A" from 1995 to 1997.

Kemble coached Counties Manukau in 2006.

=== Appointment to Kiwi coach ===
After several years working away from rugby league Kemble was named the coach of the Kiwis, filling the post left vacant by Brian McClennan in July 2007.

Kemble's appointment to the position of the Kiwi coach was controversial from the outset, in part through no fault of his own. First of all, the departure of Brian McClennan to coach the Leeds Rhinos was confusing given his unprecedented success and popularity amongst the Kiwi players and the New Zealand rugby league public as well as his expressed desire to remain in the role. Preventing McClennan from remaining in the role was a controversial clause whereby the NZRL will not consider anyone living outside New Zealand for coaching the Kiwis. The NZRL were criticised severely for losing McClennan with rumours abound that he was "pushed" out of the role. Outspoken chairman Andrew Chalmers and Kemble's former coach Graham Lowe bore the brunt of public derision.

Although Kemble had been an integral part of the New Zealand coaching structure for several years some questioned his credentials on the basis of his lack of experience coaching in a more rigorous competition such as Australasia's NRL or the Super League. However this argument was dismissed by the NZRL on the basis of the considerable success of Kemble's predecessor Brian McClennan who did come through the New Zealand coaching system to lead the Kiwis to victory in the 2005 Tri-Nations.

=== 2007 Centenary Test vs Australia ===
Kemble's test coaching career got off to the worst possible start both on and off the field. On 14 October 2007 the Kiwis suffered their largest ever defeat in the Centenary Test losing 58–0 to the Kangaroos at Westpac Trust Stadium in Wellington. The evening following the test match a young woman claimed she was sexually violated by a group of men believed to be with the Kiwi side at the team hotel in Lower Hutt. The woman subsequently chose not to pursue the matter however several Kiwi players faced internal disciplinary action.

=== 2007 Kiwi tour of Great Britain and France ===
Under Kemble the Kiwis went on to lose the first of their three test series against Great Britain going down 14–20 against the Lions at Huddersfield on 27 October 2007. Following the loss an Australian newspaper reported that former Kiwi captain Hugh McGahan was concerned at Kemble's poor start and suggested that Australian former and current Brisbane Broncos coach Wayne Bennett should be pursued for the role. McGahan later claimed that his comments had been grossly misreported by the journalist.

In the second test of the series on 3 November 2007, Kemble returned to Hull where he had spent a large portion of his playing days with Hull FC albeit to the newly built KC Stadium rather than The Boulevard where Hull FC played prior to it being built. It was to be a disastrous homecoming however as the Kiwis suffered their second humiliating defeat under Kemble when beaten 44–0 by an inspired Great Britain. The win gave Great Britain an unassailable series lead leaving the Kiwis with only pride to play for in the final test at JJB Stadium in Wigan.

Intense criticism followed the 2nd Test loss, some of it directed at the players, some of it toward the management of the NZRL, however Kemble also copped severe criticism from some quarters with one commentator suggesting that Kemble "must be sacked at the series-end" and describing him as a "captain of calamity". Following the loss, Kiwi's captain Roy Asotasi hinted at the possibility of internal issues for the players in adjusting to Kemble's coaching style when he compared Kemble's approach with that of his predecessor McClennan describing them as "very different" and reporting that the group was "still trying to gel". Following the loss in an extremely frank admission Kemble acknowledged that he was contemplating resigning from his post if the Kiwis were whitewashed 3–0 by Great Britain.

Despite a far more spirited performance in the 3rd Test the Kiwis were unable to prevent the whitewash losing 22–28 after leading 12–0 early in the match. Kemble was forthright in expressing his desire to remain Kiwi coach following the loss with the general feeling being that the loss was "close enough" for him to retain the position. Kemble was the subject of some ridicule for post-match comments which suggested that the Kiwis "almost won the test series" despite an aggregated score of 92–36 across the three tests.

The Kiwis beat France in the final test match of the tour 22–16 giving captain Roy Asotasi his first win as Kiwi captain.

=== Resignation ===
On Saturday 18 January 2008, Gary Kemble resigned. Captain Roy Asotasi along with fellow Kiwi teammate David Kidwell had earlier expressed their concern publicly at the lack of respect they and other senior players held for the coach due to his inexperience at that level and deemed the 2008 World Cup already a failure if Kemble didn't receive some kind of help.

== Later years ==
Kemble is the current head coach of the Papakura Sea Eagles in the Auckland Rugby League. Gary is now the manager of the Horsham Downs Golf Club in Hamilton

== Personal life ==
Gary Kemble is married to Stephanie and they have four sons. After his stint with the Auckland Warriors reserve grade side Kemble spent some time away from rugby league working in real estate for several years. Prior to his international rugby league career, Kemble was an up-and-coming cricketer. He played his club cricket as a Wicket-keeper for Papakura, and was part of the Northern Districts Under-23 cricket team that won the national title.
