= Tim Slatter =

English rugby league footballer

Playing information
- Position: Second-row
Club
Years	Team	Pld	T	G	FG	P
1977–78	Wakefield Trinity	1	0	0	0	0
1983–88	Featherstone Rovers	61+15	8	0	0	32
	Total	77	8	0	0	32

Tim Slatter is a former professional rugby league footballer who played in the 1980s. He played at club level for Wakefield Trinity and Featherstone Rovers, as a second-row.

== Playing career ==
Slatter made his début for Featherstone Rovers on Tuesday 1 February 1983, during his time at Featherstone Rovers he scored ten 3-point tries, and three 4-point tries.

=== Challenge Cup Final appearances ===
Slatter played at second-row in Featherstone Rovers' 14-12 victory over Hull F.C. in the 1983 Challenge Cup Final during the 1982–83 season at Wembley Stadium, London on Saturday 7 May 1983, in front of a crowd of 84,969.
