= William Sandham (rugby) =

Wales international rugby league footballer

Bill Sandham
Personal information
- Full name: William Sandham
- Born: 10 March 1879 Wales
- Died: 1961 Neath, Wales

Playing information

Rugby union
Club
Years	Team	Pld	T	G	FG	P
≤1909–≤09	Neath RFC

Rugby league
- Position: Forward
Club
Years	Team	Pld	T	G	FG	P
≤1909–≥12	Hull Kingston Rovers	183	87	0	0	261
Representative
Years	Team	Pld	T	G	FG	P
1912	Wales	1

William "Bill" Sandham (10 March 1879 – 1961) was a Welsh rugby union and professional rugby league footballer who played in the 1900s and 1910s. He played club level rugby union (RU) for Neath RFC, and representative level rugby league (RL) for Wales, and at club level for Hull Kingston Rovers, as a forward.

== Playing career ==
=== International honours ===
Bill Sandham played as a forward for Wales while at Hull Kingston Rovers in the 5–31 defeat by England at The Watersheddings, Oldham on Saturday 20 January 1912.

=== Club career ===
Bill Sandham was Hull Kingston Rovers' second highest try-scorer in the 1910–11 and 1911–12 seasons, and set Hull Kingston Rovers' "most tries in a season by a forward" record with 25-tries scored in the 1912–13 season, this record was extended to 26-tries by Phil Lowe in the 1972–73 season. Bill Sandham was considered a "Probable" for the 1910 Great Britain Lions tour of Australia and New Zealand, but ultimately he was not selected for the tour.
