= Darren Coen =

English rugby league footballer

Playing information
- Position: Fullback
Club
Years	Team	Pld	T	G	FG	P
1982–85	Castleford	77	15	0	0	55

Darren Coen is a former professional rugby league footballer who played in the 1980s. He played at club level for Castleford, as a fullback.

== Playing career ==
=== County Cup Final appearances ===
Coen played fullback in Castleford's 2-13 defeat by Hull F.C. in the 1983 Yorkshire Cup Final during the 1983–84 season at Elland Road, Leeds, on Saturday 15 October 1983.
