= Keiron O'Loughlin =

English rugby league footballer

Personal information
- Born: 13 March 1953 (age 73) Wigan, England

Playing information
- Position: Wing, Centre, Stand-off
Club
Years	Team	Pld	T	G	FG	P
1970–79	Wigan	260	93	0	0	279
1979–81	Workington Town	57	13	0	3	42
1981–85	Widnes	119	37	0	0	132
1985–88	Salford	94	19	0	0	76
1989	Leigh	3	0	0	0	0
1990	Workington Town	6	0	0	0	0
	Total	539	162	0	3	529
Representative
Years	Team	Pld	T	G	FG	P
1971–85	Lancashire	4	0	0	0	0
- Relatives: See: O'Loughlin Farrell family

Keiron O'Loughlin (born 13 March 1953) is an English former professional rugby league footballer who played for Wigan, Workington Town, Widnes, Salford and Leigh. He is the father of England and Great Britain international Sean O'Loughlin and grandfather of England rugby union player Owen Farrell.

== Background ==
O'Loughlin was born in Wigan, Lancashire, England.

=== Genealogical information ===
O'Loughlin is the father of the rugby league player Sean O'Loughlin, the brother of Kevin O'Loughlin, (the rugby league wing, centre, stand-off, second-row, or loose forward who played in the 1960s, 1970s and 1980s for Wigan, Swinton and Blackpool Borough), and the grandfather of the rugby union footballer Owen Farrell.

== Playing career ==
=== County honours ===
O'Loughlin represented Lancashire five times between 1971 and 1985.

=== Challenge Cup Final appearances ===
O'Loughlin played at centre in Widnes 14-14 draw with Hull F.C. in the 1982 Challenge Cup Final during the 1981–82 season at Wembley Stadium, London on Saturday 1 May 1982, in front of a crowd of 92,147, played at centre in the 9-18 defeat by Hull F.C. in the 1982 Challenge Cup Final replay during the 1981–82 season at Elland Road, Leeds on Wednesday 19 May 1982, in front of a crowd of 41,171, and played stand-off in the 19-6 victory over Wigan in the 1984 Challenge Cup Final during the 1983–84 season at Wembley Stadium, London on Saturday 5 May 1984, in front of a crowd of 80,116.

=== County Cup Final appearances ===
O'Loughlin played at centre, and scored two tries in Wigan's 19-9 victory over Salford in the 1973 Lancashire Cup Final during the 1973–74 season at Wilderspool Stadium, Warrington on Saturday 13 October 1973, and played at centre in Widnes' 8-12 defeat by Barrow in the 1983 Lancashire Cup Final during the 1983–84 season at Central Park, Wigan on Saturday 1 October 1983.

=== John Player Special Trophy Final appearances ===
O'Loughlin played at centre in Widnes' 10-18 defeat by Leeds in the 1983–84 John Player Special Trophy Final during the 1983–84 season at Central Park, Wigan on Saturday 14 January 1984.
