= Kevin Watson (rugby league) =

English rugby league footballer (1960/61-2007)

Personal information
- Full name: Kevin Watson
- Died: 2007

Playing information
- Position: Prop, Second-row
Club
Years	Team	Pld	T	G	FG	P
1980–84	Hull Kingston Rovers	32	2	0	0	6
- As of 24 May 2021

Kevin "Bobo" Watson was a prop or second row who played for Hull Kingston Rovers during their successful period in the early 1980s. Watson made 14 appearances (plus 18 as substitute) for the club from 1980 to 1984, scoring two tries for six points. He made 12 of those appearances during the 1980–81 season, when he came off the bench in the 11–7 Premiership victory over Hull F.C. at Headingley. He was also a member of the squad for the 1981 Challenge Cup final. He died suddenly at the age of 46 in January 2007.
