= David Topliss =

Former RL coach and GB & England international rugby league footballer

Personal information
- Full name: David John Topliss
- Born: 29 December 1949 Wakefield, England
- Died: 16 June 2008 (aged 58) Crofton, Wakefield, England

Playing information
- Position: Stand-off
Club
Years	Team	Pld	T	G	FG	P
1968–81	Wakefield Trinity	418	195	2	12	602
1976	Penrith Panthers	12	0	0	0	0
1977	Balmain Tigers	18	10	0	1	31
1981–85	Hull FC	120	56	0	2	189
1985–87	Oldham	49	9	0	0	36
1987–88	Wakefield Trinity	10	1	0	0	4
	Total	627	271	2	15	862
Representative
Years	Team	Pld	T	G	FG	P
1971–80	Yorkshire	15	5	0	0	15
1975	England	1	0	0	0	0
1973–82	Great Britain	4	0	0	0	0

Coaching information
Club
Years	Team	Gms	W	D	L	W%
1987–94	Wakefield Trinity	240	111	11	118	46

David Topliss (29 December 1949 – 16 June 2008) was an English World Cup winning professional rugby league footballer who played in the 1960s, 1970s and 1980s, and coached in the 1980s and 1990s. He played at representative level for Great Britain, England and Yorkshire, at club level for Wakefield Trinity (two spells) (captain), Penrith Panthers, Balmain Tigers, Hull FC (captain) and Oldham, as a stand-off. and coached at club level for Wakefield Trinity.

== Background ==
Topliss was born in Wakefield, West Riding of Yorkshire, England, and he died aged 58 after suffering a heart attack during a five-a-side football game at Crofton Community Centre, in Crofton, Wakefield, West Yorkshire, England.

== Playing career ==
=== Wakefield Trinity ===
Topliss' playing career started at Normanton Juniors ARLFC before spending thirteen seasons with Wakefield Trinity from 1968 to 1981, he played on the wing and he made his début for Wakefield Trinity against Halifax at Thrum Hall, Halifax on Monday 2 September 1968, and won the Lance Todd Trophy as man of the match in the 1979 Challenge Cup Final even though he was on the losing side.

Topliss played stand-off, and scored a try in Wakefield Trinity's 11–22 defeat by Halifax in the 1971–72 Player's No.6 Trophy Final during the 1971–72 season at Odsal Stadium, Bradford on Saturday 22 January 1972.

Topliss played stand-off in Wakefield Trinity's 2–7 defeat by Leeds in the 1973–74 Yorkshire Cup Final during the 1973–74 season at Headingley, Leeds on Saturday 20 October 1973, and played stand-off in the 13–16 defeat by Hull Kingston Rovers in the 1974–75 Yorkshire County Cup Final during the 1974–75 season at Headingley Rugby Stadium, Leeds on Saturday 26 October 1974.

Topliss played stand-off, was captain, and won the Lance Todd Trophy in Wakefield Trinity's 3–12 defeat by Widnes in the 1978–79 Challenge Cup Final during the 1978–79 season at Wembley Stadium, London on Saturday 5 May 1979, in front of a crowd of a crowd of 94,218.

Topliss' Testimonial match at Wakefield Trinity took place in 1980.

=== Australia ===
Topliss played in Australian season of 1976 for the Penrith Panthers and in 1977 for the Balmain Tigers. In the latter season he achieved the rare feat of scoring five tries in a match – mostly by backing up fellow Englishman Brian Lockwood — against an admittedly extremely weak Newtown team. Topliss would prove the last player to score five tries in one NSWRFL/NSWRL match until Andrew Ettingshausen did so more than twelve years later. He remains the only five-eighth or halfback to ever achieve this feat, and alongside Frank Burge, Peter Langmack and Nathan Merritt, one of only four players playing outside the three-quarter line to do so.

=== Hull ===
Topliss joined Hull F.C. at age 31 for a fee of £15,000. He captained them to six finals in his four years at the club including when they won the Challenge Cup in 1982. He was captain of Hull during the 1981–82, 1982–83, 1983–84 and 1984–85 seasons.

He played stand-off in Hull F.C.'s 14–14 draw with Widnes in the 1981–82 Challenge Cup Final during the 1981–82 season at Wembley Stadium, London on Saturday 1 May 1982, in front of a crowd of 92,147, and played stand-off, and scored two tries in the 18–9 victory over Widnes in the 1981–82 Challenge Cup Final replay during the 1981–82 season at Elland Road, Leeds on Wednesday 19 May 1982, in front of a crowd of 41,171.

He played stand-off in Hull F.C.'s 18–7 victory over Bradford Northern in the 1982–83 Yorkshire County Cup Final during the 1982–83 season at Elland Road, Leeds on Saturday 2 October 1982, played stand-off in Hull F.C.'s 13–2 victory over Castleford in the 1983–84 Yorkshire County Cup Final during the 1983–84 season at Elland Road, Leeds on Saturday 15 October 1983, and was a substitute in Hull FC's 29–12 victory over Hull Kingston Rovers in the 1984–85 Yorkshire County Cup Final during the 1984–85 season at Elland Road, Leeds on Saturday 27 October 1984.

He played stand-off, and was captain in Hull F.C.'s 0–12 defeat by Hull Kingston Rovers in the 1984–85 John Player Special Trophy Final during the 1984–85 season at Boothferry Park, Kingston upon Hull on Saturday 26 January 1985 in front of a crowd of 25,326.

=== Oldham ===
Topliss played stand-off in Oldham's 6–27 defeat by Wigan in the 1986–87 Lancashire Cup County Cup Final during the 1986–87 season at Knowsley Road, St. Helens on Sunday 19 October 1986.

=== Representative honours ===
Topliss won caps for England while at Wakefield Trinity in 1975 against France, and won caps for Great Britain while at Wakefield Trinity in 1973 against Australia (2 matches), in 1979 against Australia, and while at Hull F.C. in 1982 against Australia.

Topliss was selected for Great Britain Squad while at Wakefield Trinity for the 1972 Rugby League World Cup in France. However, David Topliss did not participate in any of the four matches.

He went on the 1974 and 1979 Ashes tours of Australia, playing twice on the 1974 tour, and once on the 1979 tour, and whilst at Hull he captained Great Britain against the Kangaroos in 1982.

Topliss played stand-off in Great Britain's 7–8 defeat by France in the friendly at Stadio Pier Luigi Penzo, Venice on Saturday 31 July 1982.

He left Hull in 1985 and finished his playing career with Oldham (1985–87). During his time at the side he became synonymous with local supporters, earning the chant and slogan 'Go Topliss!'. At one game against Wrexham Topliss decided to remove his rugby shirt playfully in response to the chant, which resulted in him being banned from the game for 1 year

Topliss won cap(s) for Yorkshire while at Wakefield Trinity.

== Coaching career ==
Topliss coached Wakefield Trinity from 1987 to 1994 and also had a spell in charge of Great Britain under-21s in 1989. In his first season with Trinity, he guided them to promotion back into the old First Division, retiring as a player after the last match of the season. He remained at Wakefield as coach until 1994 when he stepped down to concentrate on his business.

=== County Cup Final appearances ===
David Topliss was the coach in Wakefield Trinity's 8–11 defeat by Castleford in the 1990–91 Yorkshire County Cup Final during the 1990–91 season at Elland Road, Leeds on Sunday 23 September 1990, and was the coach in the 29–16 victory over Sheffield Eagles in the 1992–93 Yorkshire County Cup Final during the 1992–93 season at Elland Road, Leeds on Sunday 18 October 1992.

== Honoured by Arriva Yorkshire ==
Arriva Yorkshire honoured 13 rugby league footballers on Thursday 20 August 2009, at a ceremony at The Jungle, the home of the Castleford Tigers. A fleet of new buses were named after the 'Arriva Yorkshire Rugby League Dream Team'. Members of the public nominated the best ever rugby league footballers to have played in West Yorkshire, supported by local rugby league journalists; James Deighton from BBC Leeds, and Tim Butcher, editor of Rugby League World. The 'Arriva Yorkshire Rugby League Dream Team' is; Trevor Foster MBE, Neil Fox MBE, Albert Goldthorpe, Alan Hardisty, Stan Kielty, Lewis Jones, Roger Millward MBE, Malcolm Reilly, Garry Schofield, Keith Senior, David Topliss, Dave Valentine and Adrian Vowles.
