= Gary Connell =

English footballer (born 1959)

Personal information
- Born: first ¼ 1959 (age 66–67) Pontefract, West Riding of Yorkshire, England

Playing information
- Position: Prop, Second-row
Club
Years	Team	Pld	T	G	FG	P
1978–85	Castleford	151	16	0	0	54

Gary Connell (birth registered first ¼ 1959) is an English former professional rugby league footballer who played in the 1970s and 1980s. He played at club level for Castleford, as a prop or second-row.

== Playing career ==
=== County Cup Final appearances ===
Gary Connell played at prop in Castleford's 2–13 defeat by Hull F.C. in the 1983 Yorkshire Cup Final during the 1983–84 season at Elland Road, Leeds, on Saturday 15 October 1983.
