= Ian Van Bellen =

English rugby league footballer (1945–2019)

Personal information
- Born: 30 October 1945 Huddersfield, West Riding of Yorkshire, England
- Died: 30 July 2019 (aged 73)

Playing information

Rugby union
Club
| Years | Team | Pld | T | G | FG | P |
|---|---|---|---|---|---|---|
| | Huddersfield R.U.F.C. |

Rugby league
- Position: Prop
Club
| Years | Team | Pld | T | G | FG | P |
|---|---|---|---|---|---|---|
| 1963–70 | Huddersfield | 161+5 | 26 | 3 | 0 | 84 |
| 1970–73 | Castleford | 51 | 11 | 5 | 3 | 49 |
| 1973–77 | Huddersfield |
| 1977–80 | Bradford Northern | 63+23 | 7 | 1 | 0 | 23 |
| 1980–81 | Fulham RLFC | 20+2 | 4 | 0 | 0 | 12 |
| 1981–82 | Blackpool Borough | 23+1 | 2 | 0 | 0 | 6 |
| 1982–83 | Halifax | 33 | 1 | 0 | 0 | 3 |
| 1983–84 | Kent Invicta | 19+5 | 2 | 0 | 0 | 8 |
| 1984–85 | Keighley | 4 | 0 | 0 | 0 | 0 |
| | Total | 410 | 53 | 9 | 3 | 185 |
Representative
| Years | Team | Pld | T | G | FG | P |
| 1969 | Great Britain U24 | 1 | 0 | 0 | 0 | 0 |
- Relatives: Gary Van Bellen (brother)

Ian Van Bellen (30 October 1945 – 30 July 2019), also known by the nickname of "Selwyn" (after his perceived facial similarity to Bill Maynard who appeared in Oh No, It's Selwyn Froggitt!), was an English rugby union and professional rugby league footballer who played in the 1960s, 1970s and 1980s.

He played club level rugby union for Huddersfield R.U.F.C., and club level rugby league for Huddersfield, Castleford, Bradford Northern, Fulham RLFC, Blackpool Borough, Halifax, Kent Invicta and Keighley as a prop.

== Background ==
Ian Van Bellen was born in Huddersfield, West Riding of Yorkshire, England.

== Playing career ==
=== Castleford ===
Van Bellen started his rugby league career at Huddersfield, and signed for Castleford in September 1970. He played prop in Castleford's 7–11 defeat by Hull Kingston Rovers in the 1971 Yorkshire Cup Final during the 1971–72 season at Belle Vue, Wakefield on Saturday 21 August 1971.

He returned to Huddersfield in April 1973 as part of an exchange deal for second-row forward Trevor Chawner.

=== Bradford Northern ===
Van Bellen was signed by Bradford Northern in October 1977 for a fee of £1,500. At the end of the 1978–79 season, he appeared as a substitute in Bradford Northern's 2–24 defeat against Leeds in the 1978–79 Premiership Final at Fartown, Huddersfield on 27 May 1979. He was also a substitute in the club's 6–0 victory over Widnes in the 1979–80 John Player Trophy Final during the 1979–80 season at Headingley, Leeds on Saturday 5 January 1980.

=== Later career ===
In July 1980, Van Bellen was signed by new club Fulham RLFC for a fee of £5,000. He played in the club's first ever competitive match against Wigan at Craven Cottage on 14 September 1980.

In August 1984, Van Bellen joined Keighley. He retired from playing in 1985.

=== Representative career ===
While playing for Huddersfield, Van Bellen made one appearance for the Great Britain under-24 team in a 42–2 win against France under-24's on 17 April 1969 at Wheldon Road, Castleford.

== Personal life ==
Van Bellen is the older brother of Gary Van Bellen, who also played rugby league. They played together at Bradford Northern.

Van Bellen retrieved the "Fartown Stone" from the Fartown Ground when a section of the ground was being demolished. The "Fartown Stone" now resides at the Kirklees Stadium, Huddersfield.

Van Bellen died in July 2019, aged 73.
