= Paul Prendiville =

GB & Wales international rugby league footballer

Personal information
- Full name: Paul Prendiville
- Born: 10 April 1954 (age 70); Llanelli district, Wales

Playing information
- Position: Wing, Centre
Club
Years	Team	Pld	T	G	FG	P
1978–82	Hull F.C.	215	98	115	0	524
1983–84	Leeds	25	5	4	0	28
1984–86	Hull F.C.	41	6	39	0	102
1986–87	York	21	5	50	3	123
	Total	302	114	208	3	777
Representative
Years	Team	Pld	T	G	FG	P
1979–84	Wales	6	1	0	0	3
1982	Great Britain	1	0	0	0	0

Paul Prendiville (born 10 April 1954) is a Welsh former professional rugby league footballer who played in the 1970s and 1980s. He played at representative level for Great Britain and Wales, and at club level for Hull F.C. (two spells), Leeds and York, as a wing or centre.

== Playing career ==
=== Hull F.C. ===
Born in Llanelli, Wales, Prendiville joined Hull F.C. in 1978 from Welsh rugby union side, Bynea. He played on the wing in Hull's 5–10 defeat by Hull Kingston Rovers in the 1980 Challenge Cup Final during the 1979–80 season at Wembley Stadium, London on Saturday 3 May 1980, in front of a crowd of 95,000, played on the wing in the 14–14 draw with Widnes in the 1982 Challenge Cup Final during the 1981–82 season at Wembley Stadium, London on Saturday 1 May 1982, in front of a crowd of 92,147, and played on the wing in the 18–9 victory over Widnes in the 1982 Challenge Cup Final replay during the 1981–82 season at Elland Road, Leeds on Wednesday 19 May 1982, in front of a crowd of 41,171.

Prendiville played on the wing in Hull's 12–4 victory over Hull Kingston Rovers in the 1981–82 John Player Trophy Final during the 1981–82 season at Headingley, Leeds on Saturday 23 January 1982.

Prendiville played on the wing and scored a try in Hull's 18–7 victory over Bradford Northern in the 1982 Yorkshire Cup Final during the 1982–83 season at Elland Road, Leeds on Saturday 2 October 1982.

=== Leeds ===
After being transfer listed by Hull, Prendiville joined Leeds in October 1983. He played on the wing in Leeds' 18–10 victory over Widnes in the 1983–84 John Player Special Trophy Final during the 1983–84 season at Central Park, Wigan on Saturday 14 January 1984. He returned to Hull at the end of the season.

=== Representative career ===
Prendiville won caps for Wales while at Hull in 1979 against England, in 1980 against England, in 1981 against France, and England, in 1982 against Australia, and while at Leeds in 1984 against England, and won a cap for Great Britain while at Hull in 1982 against France.

Prendiville played on the wing in Great Britain's 7-8 defeat by France in the friendly at Stadio Pier Luigi Penzo, Venice on Saturday 31 July 1982.
