= Steve Norton =

RL coach and GB & England international rugby league footballer (born 1951)

Personal information
- Born: 22 December 1951 (age 74) Castleford, England

Playing information
- Position: Second-row, Loose forward
Club
Years	Team	Pld	T	G	FG	P
1970–78	Castleford	183	56	4	1	177
1976–77	Manly Sea Eagles	26	1	0	0	3
1978–87	Hull FC	253+17	44	0	9	146
1988–89	Wakefield Trinity	9+1	3	0	0	12
	Total	489	104	4	10	338
Representative
Years	Team	Pld	T	G	FG	P
1972–82	Yorkshire	13	1	0	0	3
1975–81	England	11	2	0	0	6
1974–82	Great Britain	11+1	0	0	0	0
1974	GB tour games	12+2	5	0	0	15

Coaching information
Club
Years	Team	Gms	W	D	L	W%
1990–93	Barrow
- Relatives: Lee Crooks (brother-in-law); Ben Crooks (nephew)

Stephen Norton (born 22 December 1951), also known by the nickname of "Knocker", is an English former professional rugby league footballer who played in the 1970s and 1980s, and coached in the 1990s. He played at representative level for Great Britain, England and Yorkshire, and at club level for Fryston ARLFC, Castleford, Hull FC and Wakefield Trinity, as a second-row or loose forward, and coached at club level for Barrow.

== Background ==
Norton was born in Castleford, West Riding of Yorkshire, England. He is the brother-in-law of the rugby league footballer Lee Crooks, and the uncle of the rugby league footballer Ben Crooks.

== Playing career ==
=== International honours ===
Norton won caps playing loose forward for England while at Castleford in the 7–12 defeat by Wales in Brisbane on 10 June 1975, the 17–17 draw with New Zealand in Auckland on 21 June 1975, the 10–10 draw with Australia in Sydney on 28 June 1975, the 22–16 victory over Wales at Warrington's stadium on 20 September 1975, the 48–2 victory over France in Bordeaux on 11 October 1975, the 27–12 victory over New Zealand at Bradford Northern's stadium on 25 October 1975, the 16–13 victory over Australia at Wigan's stadium on 1 November 1975, and the 15–28 defeat by France in Carcassonne on 20 March 1977, and while at Hull in 1978 against Wales, and in 1981 against Wales (2 matches), and won caps for Great Britain while at Castleford playing as a substitute in the victory over 16–11 Australia in Sydney on 6 July 1974, playing at second-row in the 8–13 defeat by New Zealand in Auckland on 27 July 1974, and at second-row in the 17–8 victory over New Zealand in Christchurch on 4 August 1974, and while at Hull in 1978 against Australia (3 matches), in 1979 against Australia (2 matches), in 1980 against New Zealand, and in 1981 against France (2 matches), and 1982 Australia.

=== County honours ===
Norton won caps playing loose forward for Yorkshire while at Castleford in the 32–18 victory over Lancashire at Castleford's stadium on 11 October 1972, the 7–10 defeat by Cumberland at Workington Town's stadium on 11 September 1974, the 22–15 victory over Other Nationalities at Hull Kingston Rovers' stadium on 18 September 1974, the 20–14 victory over Lancashire at Keighley's stadium on 25 September 1974, scoring 1-try in the 11–29 defeat by Lancashire at Widnes' stadium on 16 October 1974, the 10–7 victory over Cumbria at Dewsbury's stadium on 19 November 1975, the 16–16 draw with Other Nationalities at Bradford Northern's stadium on 6 December 1975, the 17–7 victory over Lancashire at Wigan's stadium on 20 December 1975, and the 18–15 victory over Lancashire at Castleford's stadium on 1 March 1977.

=== Challenge Cup Final appearances ===
Norton played loose forward, and was captain in Hull FC's 5–10 defeat by Hull Kingston Rovers in the 1980 Challenge Cup Final during the 1979–80 season at Wembley Stadium, London on Saturday 3 May 1980, in front of a crowd of 95,000, played loose forward, and scored a try in the 14–14 draw with Widnes in the 1982 Challenge Cup Final during the 1981–82 season at Wembley Stadium, London on Saturday 1 May 1982, in front of a crowd of 92,147, played loose forward in the 18–9 victory over Widnes in the 1982 Challenge Cup Final replay during the 1981–82 season at Elland Road, Leeds on Wednesday 19 May 1982, in front of a crowd of 41,171, and played loose forward in the 24–28 defeat by Wigan in the 1985 Challenge Cup Final during the 1984–85 season at Wembley Stadium, London on Saturday 4 May 1985, in front of a crowd of 99,801, in what is regarded as the most marvellous cup final in living memory, which Hull narrowly lost after fighting back from 12–28 down at half-time.

=== County Cup Final appearances ===
Norton played at centre in Castleford's 7–11 defeat by Hull Kingston Rovers in the 1971 Yorkshire Cup Final during the 1971–72 season at Belle Vue, Wakefield on Saturday 21 August 1971, played as an interchange/substitute (replacing loose forward Mick Crane) in Hull FC's 18–7 victory over Bradford Northern in the 1982 Yorkshire Cup Final during the 1982–83 season at Elland Road, Leeds on Saturday 2 October 1982, was as interchange/substitute in the 13–2 victory over Castleford in the 1983 Yorkshire Cup Final during the 1983–84 season at Elland Road, Leeds on Saturday 15 October 1983, played at second-row and scored a try in the 29–12 victory over Hull Kingston Rovers in the 1984 Yorkshire Cup Final during the 1984–85 season at Boothferry Park, Kingston upon Hull on Saturday 27 October 1984, and played at second-row in the 24–31 defeat by Castleford in the 1986 Yorkshire Cup Final during the 1986–87 season at Headingley, Leeds on Saturday 11 October 1986.

=== BBC2 Floodlit Trophy Final appearances ===
Norton played loose forward in Castleford's 12–4 victory over Leigh in the 1976 BBC2 Floodlit Trophy Final during the 1976–77 season at Hilton Park, Leigh on Tuesday 14 December 1976, and played loose forward in Hull FC's 13–3 victory over Hull Kingston Rovers in the 1979 BBC2 Floodlit Trophy Final during the 1979–80 season at The Boulevard, Kingston upon Hull on Tuesday 18 December 1979.

=== Player's No.6/John Player Trophy Final appearances ===
Norton played loose forward in Castleford's 25–15 victory over Blackpool Borough in the 1976–77 Player's No.6 Trophy Final during the 1976–77 season at The Willows, Salford on Saturday 22 January 1977, and played loose forward in Hull FC's 12–4 victory over Hull Kingston Rovers in the 1981–82 John Player Trophy Final during the 1981–82 season at Headingley, Leeds on Saturday 23 January 1982.

=== National Rugby League Grand Finals ===
Norton is one of only fourteen Englishmen to have played in Australian National Rugby League Grand Final winning teams, they are;

- Dick Huddart for the St. George Dragons in 1966
- Dave Bolton for the Balmain Tigers in 1969
- Mal Reilly for Manly-Warringah Sea Eagles in 1972 and 1973
- Phil Lowe, Steve Norton, and Gary Stephens for Manly-Warringah in 1976
- Kevin Ward for Manly-Warrinigah in 1987
- Lee Jackson for the Newcastle Knights in 1997
- Harvey Howard for the Brisbane Broncos in 2000
- Adrian Morley for the Sydney Roosters in 2002
- Gareth Widdop for the Melbourne Storm in 2012
- George Burgess, Sam Burgess and Tom Burgess for the South Sydney Rabbitohs in 2014

=== Testimonial match ===
Norton's Testimonial match at Hull FC took place in 1986.

Achievements
Preceded by Mike Stephenson	Rugby league transfer record Castleford to Hull FC; 1978	Succeeded by Phil Hogan
