= Fred Lindop =

British rugby league referee (1938–2023)

Fred Lindop MBE
Personal information
- Full name: George Frederick Lindop
- Born: 20 July 1938 Wakefield, West Riding of Yorkshire, England
- Died: 23 January 2023 (aged 84)

Refereeing information
Years	Competition	Apps
1966–88	Rugby Football League Championship
1967–86	Internationals

George Frederick Lindop MBE (20 July 1938 – January 2023) was a British rugby league referee. He refereed 22 test matches, including the World Cup final in 1970. He also refereed five Challenge Cup Finals.

== Biography ==
Lindop began refereeing when he joined the Wakefield Rugby League Referees' Society in 1957. He took charge of his first professional rugby league game in 1966. A year later, he refereed at international level for the first time, and was appointed for all three Tests between Great Britain and Australia during the 1967–68 Kangaroo tour.

His final game as a referee was the 1988 Challenge Cup final. He then became the RFL's controller of referees until leaving the role in 1993.

Lindop was appointed Member of the Order of the British Empire (MBE) in the 1989 New Year Honours for services to rugby league, and was inducted to the Rugby Football League's Roll of Honour in 2009.

Lindop also established the University of Sheffield rugby league team in 1969 and coached them. He coached junior rugby league at the Eastmoor club in Wakefield and the Oulton Raiders club near Leeds.

His death was announced on 23 January 2023, at the age of 84.
