= Arthur Bunting =

English RL coach and former rugby league footballer

Personal information
- Born: 13 June 1936; Ackworth, West Riding of Yorkshire, England
- Died: 7 June 2017 (aged 80)

Playing information
- Position: Scrum-half
Club
Years	Team	Pld	T	G	FG	P
1959–68	Hull Kingston Rovers	231+6	68	1	0	206

Coaching information
Club
Years	Team	Gms	W	D	L	W%
1972–75	Hull Kingston Rovers
1978–85	Hull F.C.
	Total	0	0	0	0

Arthur Bunting (13 June 1936 – 7 June 2017) was an English professional rugby league footballer who played in the 1950s and 1960s, and coached in the 1960s, 1970s and 1980s. He played at club level for Hull Kingston Rovers as a scrum-half, and coached at club level for Hull Kingston Rovers and Hull F.C..

== Playing career ==
Arthur Bunting was born in Ackworth, West Riding of Yorkshire, England, he grew up in a hot bed of rugby league in the Featherstone/Pontefract area, he played for Hull Kingston Rovers, and went on to coach them.

=== Eastern Division Championship Final appearances ===
Arthur Bunting played scrum-half in Hull Kingston Rovers' 13–10 victory over Huddersfield in the Eastern Division Championship Final during the 1962–63 season at Headingley, Leeds on Saturday 10 November 1962.

=== Challenge Cup Final appearances ===
Arthur Bunting played scrum-half in Hull Kingston Rovers' 5-13 defeat by Widnes in the 1963–64 Challenge Cup Final during the 1963–64 season at Wembley Stadium, London on Saturday 9 May 1964, in front of a crowd of 84,488.

== Coaching career ==
In December 1978, he was offered the chance to coach Hull F.C. Under Bunting, Hull won all the game's major trophies and repeatedly featured in finals, as well as creating a world record, when in winning the Second Division title in 1978–79 they won all of their 26 league games, an achievement never done before or since, he was coach of Hull until 1985.

In 1993, in recognition of his accomplishments as a coach, Bunting was one of six inaugural members to be inducted into the club's Hall of Fame.

=== Challenge Cup Final appearances ===
Arthur Bunting was the coach in Hull FC's 5-10 defeat by Hull Kingston Rovers in the 1980 Challenge Cup Final during the 1979–80 season at Wembley Stadium, London on Saturday 3 May 1980, in front of a crowd of 95,000, was the coach in the 14-14 draw with Widnes in the 1982 Challenge Cup Final during the 1981–82 season at Wembley Stadium, London on Saturday 1 May 1982, in front of a crowd of 92,147, and in the 18-9 victory over Widnes in the 1982 Challenge Cup Final replay during the 1981–82 season at Elland Road, Leeds on Wednesday 19 May 1982, in front of a crowd of 41,171. and was the coach in the 24-28 defeat by Wigan in the 1985 Challenge Cup Final during the 1984–85 season at Wembley Stadium, London on Saturday 4 May 1985, in front of a crowd of 99,801, in what is regarded as the most marvellous cup final in living memory, which Hull narrowly lost after fighting back from 12-28 down at half-time.
