= 1980–81 Rugby Football League season =

- League: Slalom Lager Championship
- Duration: August 1980- May 1981
- Teams: First Division: 16; Second Division: 15

First Division
- Champions: Bradford Northern (2nd title)
- Premiership winners: Hull Kingston Rovers
- Man of Steel Award: (England) Ken Kelly
- Top point-scorer: (England) Steve Hesford (310)
- Top try-scorer: (England) Terry Richardson (28)

Promotion and relegation
- Promoted from Second Division: York; Wigan; Fulham; Whitehaven
- Relegated to Second Division: Halifax; Salford; Workington Town; Oldham

Second Division
- Champions: York
- Runners-up: Wigan
- Top try-scorer: (England) John Crossley Jr. (35)
- Joined league: Fulham

The 1980–81 Rugby Football League season was the 86th season of professional rugby league football in Britain. Sixteen teams competed from August 1980 until May 1981 for the Slalom Lager Championship.

== Season summary ==
- Bradford Northern won the Championship for the second consecutive season.
- York won the Second Division, finishing ahead of Wigan who competed outside the top flight for the first time. Fulham joined the competition in Division Two, being promoted in their first season.
- Hull Kingston Rovers won the Premiership.

== First Division ==
Pos	Team	Pld	W	D	L	PF	PA	PP	Pts	Qualification or relegation
1	Bradford Northern (C)	30	20	1	9	447	345	129.6	41	Qualification for Premiership first round
2	Warrington	30	19	1	10	459	330	139.1	39	Qualification for Premiership first round
3	Hull Kingston Rovers	30	18	2	10	509	408	124.8	38	Qualification for Premiership first round
4	Wakefield Trinity	30	18	2	10	544	454	119.8	38	Qualification for Premiership first round
5	Castleford	30	18	2	10	526	459	114.6	38	Qualification for Premiership first round
6	Widnes	30	16	2	12	428	356	120.2	34	Qualification for Premiership first round
7	Hull	30	17	0	13	442	450	98.2	34	Qualification for Premiership first round
8	St Helens	30	15	1	14	465	370	125.7	31	Qualification for Premiership first round
9	Leigh	30	14	1	15	416	414	100.5	29	
10	Leeds	30	14	0	16	388	468	82.9	28	
11	Barrow	30	13	0	17	405	498	81.3	26	
12	Featherstone Rovers	30	12	0	18	467	446	104.7	24	
13	Halifax (R)	30	11	0	19	385	450	85.6	22	Relegated to Second Division
14	Salford (R)	30	10	1	19	473	583	81.1	21	Relegated to Second Division
15	Workington Town (R)	30	9	3	18	335	457	73.3	21	Relegated to Second Division
16	Oldham (R)	30	7	2	21	362	563	64.3	16	Relegated to Second Division

Rules for classification: 1) Points; 2) Points scored percentage (points scored divided by points conceded)
(C) Champions; (R) Relegated

== Second Division ==
Pos	Team	Pld	W	D	L	PF	PA	PP	Pts	Promotion
1	York (C, P)	28	23	0	5	649	331	196.1	46	Promoted to First Division
2	Wigan (P)	28	20	3	5	597	293	203.8	43	Promoted to First Division
3	Fulham (P)	28	20	0	8	447	237	188.6	40	Promoted to First Division
4	Whitehaven (P)	28	19	1	8	409	250	163.6	39	Promoted to First Division
5	Huddersfield	28	18	1	9	429	310	138.4	37	
6	Swinton	28	17	2	9	440	302	145.7	36	
7	Keighley	28	14	1	13	445	501	88.8	29	
8	Hunslet	28	13	1	14	447	430	104.0	27	
9	Bramley	28	13	1	14	433	431	100.5	27	
10	Rochdale Hornets	28	13	0	15	406	418	97.1	26	
11	Batley	28	12	0	16	328	405	81.0	24	
12	Dewsbury	28	11	1	16	346	364	95.1	23	
13	Doncaster	28	5	0	23	250	562	44.5	10	
14	Blackpool Borough	28	4	1	23	212	419	50.6	9	
15	Huyton	28	2	0	26	211	796	26.5	4	

Rules for classification: 1) Points; 2) Points scored percentage (points scored divided by points conceded)
(C) Champions; (P) Promoted

== Premiership ==
16 May 1981

Hull Kingston Rovers	11 – 7	Hull F.C.
Tries: Hogan, Hartley, Smith; Goals: Hubbard		Tries: Crane; Goals: Woods (2)

Headingley, Leeds
Attendance: 29,448
Referee: John Holdsworth (Leeds)
Player of the Match: Len Casey

== Statistics ==
The following are the top points scorers in all competitions in the 1980–81 season.

Most tries

Player	Team	Tries
John Crossley	York	35
Terry Richardson	Castleford	28
Steve Hubbard	Hull Kingston Rovers	25
Steve Hartley	Hull Kingston Rovers	23
Paul McDermott	York	23
Ian Slater	Huddersfield	23
Des Drummond	Leigh	20
Ian Ball	Barrow	19
John Bevan	Warrington	19
Peter Cramp	Huddersfield	19
Gary Hyde	Castleford	19
Dennis Ramsdale	Wigan	19

Most goals (including drop goals)

Player	Team	Goals
Steve Hesford	Warrington	186
Steve Quinn	Featherstone Rovers	158
Steve Diamond	Wakefield Trinity	152
Mick Burke	Widnes	150
Steve Hubbard	Hull Kingston Rovers	144
Ian Ball	Barrow	142
Jimmy Birts	Halifax	135
Graham Beale	Keighley	131
Mick Parrish	Oldham	127
George Fairbairn	Wigan	126

== Sources ==
- Fletcher, Raymond; Howes, David, eds. (1981). Rothmans Rugby League Yearbook 1981-82. Rothmans Publications. ISBN 978-0-907574-07-1.
- 1980-81 Rugby Football League season at wigan.rlfans.com
