= 1981–82 Challenge Cup =

Rugby league competition

1981–82 State Express Challenge Cup
- Duration: 6 Rounds
- Number of teams: 33
- Winners: Hull
- Runners-up: Widnes
- Lance Todd Trophy: Eddie Cunningham

The 1981–82 Challenge Cup was the 81st staging of rugby league's oldest knockout competition, the Challenge Cup. Known as the State Express Challenge Cup for sponsorship reasons, the final was contested by Widnes and Hull F.C. at Wembley. The match ended as a draw, resulting in a replay being staged at Elland Road, which Hull won 18–9.

== Preliminary round ==
Tie no	Home team	Score	Away team	Attendance
1	Hull Kingston Rovers	22–18	Featherstone Rovers	8,090

== First round ==
Tie no	Home team	Score	Away team	Attendance
1	St. Helens	12–20	Wigan	7,611
2	Workington Town	32–8	Blackpool Borough	1,410
3	Batley	23–15	Huyton	908
4	Bradford Northern	14–12	Dewsbury	4,176
5	Bramley	4–16	Wakefield Trinity	3,180
6	Cardiff City	8–19	Widnes	6,484
7	Carlisle	2–17	Castleford	5,452
8	Doncaster	6–7	Rochdale Hornets	736
9	Fulham	14–4	Hunslet	3,392
10	Halifax	17–12	Huddersfield	3,991
11	Hull	29–15	Salford	13,697
12	Keighley	6–12	Barrow	4,015
13	Leigh	28–17	Warrington	10,366
14	Swinton	5–15	Oldham	4,095
15	Whitehaven	7–17	Hull Kingston Rovers	3,965
16	York	6–34	Leeds	6,862

== Second round ==
Tie no	Home team	Score	Away team	Attendance
1	Hull Kingston Rovers	17–18	Leigh	12,034
2	Barrow	1–9	Leeds	9,677
3	Batley	6–31	Castleford	3,754
4	Bradford Northern	17–8	Workington Town	5,134
5	Fulham	5–11	Hull	9,481
6	Halifax	28–7	Rochdale Hornets	3,919
7	Wakefield Trinity	18–12	Oldham	6,567
8	Wigan	7–9	Widnes	17,467

== Third round ==
Tie no	Home team	Score	Away team	Attendance
1	Bradford Northern	8–8	Widnes	9,570
replay	Widnes	10–7	Bradford Northern	11,877
2	Hull	16–10	Halifax	16,555
3	Leigh	3–8	Castleford	11,791
4	Wakefield Trinity	2–20	Leeds	10,579

== Semi finals ==
27 March 1982

Hull	15 – 11	Castleford
Try: Kemble, Norton, O'Hara, Prendiville; Goal: Crooks; Drop goal: Topliss	Report	Try: Reilly; Goal: Hyde (4)

Headingley, Leeds
Attendance: 21,207
Referee: Billy Thompson (Huddersfield)

3 April 1982

Widnes	11 – 8	Leeds
Try: Basnett (2), O'Loughlin; Goal: J. Myler	Report	Try: Dyl, Heron; Goal: Dick

Station Road, Swinton
Attendance: 13,075
Referee: Fred Lindop (Wakefield)

== Final ==
Widnes returned to Wembley as defending champions, having won the Challenge Cup for the sixth time in their history in the previous year.

1 May 1982

Hull	14 – 14	Widnes
Try: Norton, O'Hara; Goal: Lloyd (4)	Report	Try: Cunningham (2), Wright; Goal: Burke, Gregory; Drop goal: Elwell

Wembley, London
Attendance: 92,147
Referee: Fred Lindop (Wakefield)
Player of the Match: Eddie Cunningham

Widnes led by eight points with 15 minutes of the game remaining, but Hull F.C. came back to draw the match 14–14, meaning the final would be replayed for the first time since 1954.

=== Replay ===
19 May 1982

Hull	18 – 9	Widnes
Try: Kemble, Topliss (2), Crooks; Goal: Crooks (3)	Report	Try: Wright; Goal: Burke (3)

Elland Road, Leeds
Attendance: 41,171
Referee: Fred Lindop (Wakefield)
Player of the Match: David Topliss
