= 1981–82 Rugby Football League season =

- League: Slalom Lager Championship
- Duration: August 1982- May 1982
- Teams: First Division: 16; Second Division: 17

First Division
- Champions: Leigh (2nd title)
- Premiership winners: Widnes
- Man of Steel Award: (England) Mick Morgan
- Top try-scorer: (England) Des Drummond (26)

Promotion and relegation
- Promoted from Second Division: Oldham; Carlisle; Workington Town; Halifax
- Relegated to Second Division: Fulham; Wakefield Trinity; York; Whitehaven

Second Division
- Champions: Oldham
- Runners-up: Carlisle
- Top point-scorer: (Wales) Lynn Hopkins (446)
- Top try-scorer: (England) John Jones (31)
- Joined league: Cardiff; Carlisle

The 1981–82 Rugby Football League season was the 87th ever season of professional rugby league football in Britain. Sixteen teams competed from August, 1981 until May, 1982 for the Championship.

== Season summary ==
- Leigh won the First Division for the second time.
- Third placed Widnes won the Premiership
- Fulham, Wakefield Trinity, York and Whitehaven were relegated to the Second Division.
- Oldham, Carlisle, Workington Town and Halifax were promoted to the First Division.
- Cardiff and Carlisle joined the competition in Division Two.

== First Division ==
Pos	Team	Pld	W	D	L	PF	PA	PP	Pts	Qualification or relegation
1	Leigh (C)	30	24	1	5	572	343	166.8	49	Qualification for Premiership first round
2	Hull	30	23	1	6	611	273	223.8	47	Qualification for Premiership first round
3	Widnes	30	23	1	6	551	317	173.8	47	Qualification for Premiership first round
4	Hull Kingston Rovers	30	22	1	7	565	319	177.1	45	Qualification for Premiership first round
5	Bradford Northern	30	20	1	9	425	332	128.0	41	Qualification for Premiership first round
6	Leeds	30	17	1	12	514	418	123.0	35	Qualification for Premiership first round
7	St Helens	30	17	1	12	465	415	112.0	35	Qualification for Premiership first round
8	Warrington	30	14	2	14	403	468	86.1	30	Qualification for Premiership first round
9	Barrow	30	13	0	17	408	445	91.7	26	
10	Featherstone Rovers	30	12	1	17	482	493	97.8	25	
11	Wigan	30	12	0	18	424	435	97.5	24	
12	Castleford	30	10	1	19	486	505	96.2	21	
13	Fulham (R)	30	9	1	20	365	539	67.7	19	Relegated to Second Division
14	Wakefield Trinity (R)	30	9	1	20	341	526	64.8	19	Relegated to Second Division
15	York (R)	30	4	2	24	330	773	42.7	10	Relegated to Second Division
16	Whitehaven (R)	30	2	3	25	224	565	39.6	7	Relegated to Second Division

Rules for classification: 1) Points; 2) Points scored percentage (points scored divided by points conceded)
(C) Champions; (R) Relegated

== Second Division ==
Pos	Team	Pld	W	D	L	PF	PA	PP	Pts	Qualification
1	Oldham (C, P)	32	30	0	2	734	276	265.9	60	Promoted to First Division
2	Carlisle (P)	32	28	0	4	649	296	219.3	56	Promoted to First Division
3	Workington Town (P)	32	24	0	8	777	311	249.8	48	Promoted to First Division
4	Halifax (P)	32	22	0	10	516	340	151.8	44	Promoted to First Division
5	Salford	32	20	1	11	656	433	151.5	41	
6	Hunslet	32	18	1	13	481	452	106.4	37	
7	Keighley	32	18	0	14	514	426	120.7	36	
8	Cardiff	32	17	1	14	566	549	103.1	35	
9	Dewsbury	32	16	0	16	357	464	76.9	32	
10	Swinton	32	15	0	17	514	418	123.0	30	
11	Huddersfield	32	13	1	18	370	523	70.7	27	
12	Bramley	32	13	0	19	381	513	74.3	26	
13	Rochdale Hornets	32	10	1	21	361	484	74.6	21	
14	Batley	32	8	0	24	357	596	59.9	16	
15	Blackpool Borough	32	7	0	25	341	608	56.1	14	
16	Doncaster	32	5	1	26	319	793	40.2	11	
17	Huyton	32	5	0	27	296	707	41.9	10	

Rules for classification: 1) Points; 2) Points scored percentage (points scored divided by points conceded)
(C) Champions; (P) Promoted

== Premiership ==
15 May 1982

Widnes (3)	23 – 8	Hull F.C. (2)
T-Burke, Wright, Basnett, Hughes, Adams; G-Burke (4)		T-Crooks; G-Crooks (2); DG-Crooks (2)

Headingley Stadium
Attendance: 12,100
Referee: Stan Wall
Player of the Match: Mick Burke
