= 1982–83 Rugby Football League season =

- League: Slalom Lager Championship
- Teams: First Division: 16; Second Division: 17

First Division
- Champions: Hull (6th title)
- Premiership winners: Widnes
- Man of Steel Award: (England) Allan Agar
- Top try-scorer: (England) Bob Eccles (37)

Promotion and relegation
- Promoted from Second Division: Fulham; Wakefield Trinity; Salford; Whitehaven
- Relegated to Second Division: Barrow; Workington Town; Halifax; Carlisle

Second Division
- Champions: Fulham
- Runners-up: Wakefield Trinity
- Top point-scorer: (England) Steve Diamond (308)
- Top try-scorer: (England) John Crossley (27)

The 1982–83 Rugby Football League season was the 88th ever season of professional rugby league football in Britain. Sixteen teams competed from August, 1982 until May, 1983 for the Championship.

== Season summary ==
Hull finished on top of the First Division table to claim their sixth championship, before Widnes deafeated them in the Premiershio. Fulham, Wakefield Trinity, Salford and Whitehaven were promoted to the First Division.

== First Division ==
Pos	Team	Pld	W	D	L	PF	PA	PP	Pts	Qualification or relegation
1	Hull (C)	30	23	1	6	572	293	195.2	47	Qualification for Premiership play-offs
2	Hull Kingston Rovers	30	21	1	8	496	276	179.7	43	Qualification for Premiership play-offs
3	Wigan	30	20	3	7	482	270	178.5	43	Qualification for Premiership play-offs
4	St Helens	30	19	1	10	516	395	130.6	39	Qualification for Premiership play-offs
5	Widnes	30	18	2	10	534	357	149.6	38	Qualification for Premiership play-offs
6	Leeds	30	18	2	10	480	443	108.4	38	Qualification for Premiership play-offs
7	Castleford	30	18	1	11	629	458	137.3	37	Qualification for Premiership play-offs
8	Oldham	30	15	2	13	346	320	108.1	32	Qualification for Premiership play-offs
9	Bradford Northern	30	14	2	14	381	314	121.3	30	
10	Leigh	30	13	3	14	488	374	130.5	29	
11	Warrington	30	13	2	15	423	410	103.2	28	
12	Featherstone Rovers	30	10	4	16	350	447	78.3	24	
13	Barrow (R)	30	11	1	18	472	505	93.5	23	Relegated to Second Division
14	Workington Town (R)	30	6	2	22	318	696	45.7	14	Relegated to Second Division
15	Halifax (R)	30	5	1	24	221	651	33.9	11	Relegated to Second Division
16	Carlisle (R)	30	2	0	28	252	751	33.6	4	Relegated to Second Division

Rules for classification: 1) Points; 2) Points scored percentage (points scored divided by points conceded)
(C) Champions; (R) Relegated

== Second Division ==
Pos	Team	Pld	W	D	L	PF	PA	PP	Pts	Promotion
1	Fulham (C, P)	32	27	1	4	699	294	237.8	55	Promoted to Championship
2	Wakefield Trinity (P)	32	25	2	5	672	381	176.4	52	Promoted to Championship
3	Salford (P)	32	24	0	8	686	363	189.0	48	Promoted to Championship
4	Whitehaven (P)	32	20	3	9	464	298	155.7	43	Promoted to Championship
5	Bramley	32	20	1	11	560	369	151.8	41	
6	Hunslet	32	17	5	10	553	448	123.4	39	
7	Swinton	32	19	1	12	549	454	120.9	39	
8	Cardiff	32	17	2	13	572	444	128.8	36	
9	Keighley	32	15	5	12	470	423	111.1	35	
10	York	32	15	0	17	516	455	113.4	30	
11	Blackpool Borough	32	13	1	18	381	433	88.0	27	
12	Huddersfield	32	13	1	18	397	524	75.8	27	
13	Rochdale Hornets	32	10	5	17	361	469	77.0	25	
14	Dewsbury	32	8	1	23	325	507	64.1	17	
15	Batley	32	6	1	25	305	719	42.4	13	
16	Huyton	32	6	0	26	250	687	36.4	12	
17	Doncaster	32	2	1	29	307	799	38.4	5	

Rules for classification: 1) Points; 2) Points scored percentage (points scored divided by points conceded)
(C) Champions; (P) Promoted

== Premiership ==
14 May 1983

Widnes (5)	22-10	Hull F.C. (1)
G-Lydon (5); T-Basnett (2), Myler, Gregory		G-Crooks(2); T-O'Hara, Topliss

Headingley Stadium
Attendance: 17,813
Referee: Fred Lindop
Player of the Match: Tony Myler

== Sources ==
- 1982-83 Rugby Football League season at wigan.rlfans.com
