= 1983–84 Rugby League Premiership =

1983–84 Premiership
- Structure: National knockout championship
- Winners: Hull Kingston Rovers
- Runners-up: Castleford

The 1983–84 Rugby League Premiership was the tenth end of season Rugby League Premiership competition.

The winners were Hull Kingston Rovers.

== First round ==
Date	Team one	Team two	Score
29 Apr	Castleford	Widnes	36-4
29 Apr	Hull F.C.	Bradford Northern	42-12
29 Apr	Hull Kingston Rovers	Leeds	54-0
29 Apr	Warrington	St Helens	13-19

== Semi-finals ==
Date	Team one	Team two	Score
07 May	Hull Kingston Rovers	St Helens	21-16
07 May	Hull F.C.	Castleford	12-22

== Final ==
12 May 1984

Hull Kingston Rovers	18 – 10	Castleford
Tries: Smith, Prohm, Laws, Dorahy; Goals: Dorahy		Tries: Kear; Goals: Beardmore (3)

Headingley Stadium
Attendance: 12,515
Referee: Ron Campbell (Widnes)
Player of the Match: John Dorahy

1	George Fairbairn
2	Garry Clark
3	Mike Smith
4	Gary Prohm
5	David Laws
6	John Dorahy
7	Paul Harkin
8	Roy Holdstock
9	Chris Rudd
10	John Millington
11	Chris Burton
12	Mark Broadhurst
13	Dave Hall (c)
Substitutes:
14	John Lydiat for Christopher Burton
15	Ian Robinson for John Millington
Coach:
Roger Millward

1	David Roockley
2	Darren Coen
3	Tony Marchant
4	Gary Hyde
5	John Kear
6	Steve Robinson
7	Bob Beardmore (c)
8	Kevin Ward
9	Stuart Horton
10	Gary Connell
11	Jimmy Crampton
12	Brett Atkins
13	John Joyner
Substitutes:
14	Ian Orum
15	Dean Mountain
Coach:
Mal Reilly
