= David Laws (rugby league) =

GB international rugby league footballer

Personal information
- Full name: David Laws
- Born: unknown

Playing information
- Position: Wing
Club
Years	Team	Pld	T	G	FG	P
≤1981–≥89	Hull Kingston Rovers	194	75			289
Representative
Years	Team	Pld	T	G	FG	P
1985	Yorkshire	1	0	0	0	0
1986	Great Britain	1	0	0	0	0

David Laws (birth unknown) is a former rugby union, and professional rugby league footballer who played in the 1980s. He played club level rugby union (RU) for Old Hymerians RUFC (merged to become Hull RUFC), and representative level rugby league (RL) for Great Britain, and at club level for Hull Kingston Rovers, as a wing.

== Playing career ==
=== International honours ===
David Laws won a cap for Great Britain (RL) while at Hull Kingston Rovers in 1986 against France.

=== County Honours ===
David Laws played left wing for Yorkshire v Lancashire in their 26-10 victory in the 1985 'War Of The Roses' Fixture.

=== Challenge Cup Final appearances ===
David Laws played left wing in Hull Kingston Rovers' 14–15 defeat by Castleford in the 1986 Challenge Cup Final during the 1985-86 season at Wembley Stadium, London, on Saturday 3 May 1986, in front of a crowd of 82,134.

=== County Cup Final appearances ===
David Laws played left wing in Hull Kingston Rovers' 10–29 defeat by Hull F.C. in the 1984 Yorkshire Cup Final during the 1984–85 season at Boothferry Park, Kingston upon Hull, on Saturday 27 October 1984, and played left wing in the 22–18 victory over Castleford in the 1985 Yorkshire Cup Final during the 1985–86 season at Headingley, Leeds, on Sunday 27 October 1985.

=== John Player Special Trophy Final appearances ===
David Laws played left wing in Hull Kingston Rovers' 12-0 victory over Hull F.C. in the 1984–85 John Player Special Trophy Final during the 1984–85 season at Boothferry Park, Kingston upon Hull on Saturday 26 January 1985, and played left wing, and scored a try in the 8-11 defeat by Wigan in the 1985–86 John Player Special Trophy Final during the 1985–86 season at Elland Road, Leeds on Saturday 11 January 1986.

=== Rugby League Premiership Final Appearances ===
David Laws played left wing, and scored a try in Hull Kingston Rovers' 18-10 victory over Castleford Tigers in the Final of the 1983-84 Rugby League Premiership during the 1983–84 season

David Laws played left wing, and scored a try in Hull Kingston Rovers' 36-16 defeat against St Helens in the Final of the 1984-85 Rugby League Premiership during the 1984-85 season

=== 1983 Queensland Tour ===
David Laws played in Hull Kingston Rovers' 8-6 victory over Queensland as they toured Papua New Guinea and England during the 1983–84 Rugby Football League season.

== Honours ==
Rugby League Championship Winner - 1983/84, 1984/85 Runner-Up 1982/83

Rugby League Premiership Winner - 1983/84 Runner-Up 1984/85 (Try scorer in both finals)

JPS Trophy Winner - 1984/85 Runner-Up 1985/86 (Try scorer in 85/86 final)

Yorkshire Cup Winner - 1985/86 Runner-Up 1984/85

- Hull KR Heritage Number - 812 (Debut v Halifax, Thrum Hall, April 1981)
- Great Britain international 1986
- Yorkshire representative 1985
