= Garry Clark =

GB & England international rugby league footballer

Personal information
- Born: 4 January 1965 (age 61) Hull, England

Playing information
- Position: Wing
Club
Years	Team	Pld	T	G	FG	P
1982–91	Hull Kingston Rovers	259	121	4	0	475
1991–92	Scarborough Pirates	25	11	0	0	44
1992–93	Hull FC	3	0	0	0	0
	Total	287	132	4	0	519
Representative
Years	Team	Pld	T	G	FG	P
1983	Great Britain U24	3	3	0	0	9
1984	Great Britain U21	2	1	0	0	4
1984	England	1	3	0	0	12
1984–85	Great Britain	3	0	0	0	0

Garry Clark (born 4 January 1965) is an English former professional rugby league footballer who played in the 1980s and 1990s. He played at representative level for Great Britain and England, and at club level for Hull Kingston Rovers, Scarborough Pirates and Hull FC, as a wing.

== Playing career ==
=== Club career ===
Clark made his début for Hull Kingston Rovers in 1982. In his time at Rovers he was a First Division Championship winner twice (in the 1983–84 season and 1984–85 season), a Premiership winner, a John Player Trophy winner, a Yorkshire Cup winner and a Second Division Championship winner.

Clark played in the Robins' famous 8–6 victory over Queensland as they toured Papua New Guinea and England in October 1983. He played in Hull Kingston Rovers' 18–10 victory over Castleford Tigers in the Final of the 1983-84 Rugby League Premiership during the 1983–84 season.

Clark played in Hull Kingston Rovers' 12–29 defeat by Hull F.C. in the 1984–85 Yorkshire Cup Final during the 1984–85 season at Boothferry Park, Kingston upon Hull, on Saturday 27 October 1984. He also played and scored a try in Hull Kingston Rovers' 12–0 victory over Hull F.C. in the 1984–85 John Player Special Trophy Final during the 1984–85 season at Boothferry Park, Kingston upon Hull on Saturday 26 January 1985, and played in Hull Kingston Rovers' 36–16 defeat against St Helens in the Final of the 1984-85 Rugby League Premiership during the 1984–85 season.

Clark played and scored a try in the 22–18 victory over Castleford in the 1985–86 Yorkshire Cup Final during the 1985–86 season at Headingley, Leeds, on Sunday 27 October 1985, and played in the 8–11 defeat by Wigan in the 1985–86 John Player Special Trophy Final during the 1985–86 season at Elland Road, Leeds on Saturday 11 January 1986. Clark played in Hull Kingston Rovers' 14–15 defeat by Castleford in the 1985–86 Challenge Cup Final during the 1985–86 season at Wembley Stadium, London, on Saturday 3 May 1986.

His final honours with the club was as part of the Second Division Championship winning team of the 1989–90 season.

His form dipped following a number of shoulder injuries in the late 80's and early 90's and he joined Scarborough Pirates at the start of the 1991–92 season, scoring 11 tries in 25 appearances. After the club folded at the end of the season, he joined Hull F.C. Clark played three games for Hull before announcing his retirement in January 1993 at the age of 28 due to a shoulder injury.

=== International honours ===
Clark won a cap for England while at Hull Kingston Rovers in 1984 against Wales scoring a hat-trick, and won caps for Great Britain while at Hull Kingston Rovers in 1984 against France (2 matches), and in 1985 against France. He toured Australia and New Zealand in 1984.

== Honours ==
- Championship: 1983–84, 1984–85 Runner-Up 1982-83
- Yorkshire Cup: 1985–86 Runner-Up 1984-85
- John Player Special Trophy: 1984–85 Runner-Up 1985-86
- Premiership: 1983–84 Runner-Up 1984-85
- Second Division: 1989–90
- Challenge Cup: Runner-Up 1985-86

Hull KR Heritage Number - 820 (Debut v Workington Town, Craven Park August 1982)

- 1983 Great Britain U-24
- 1984 Great Britain Lions Tourist
- 1984,1985 Great Britain
- 1984 England
