= Ian Robinson (rugby league) =

English rugby league footballer

Personal information
- Born: 6 March 1957 (age 68); Kingston upon Hull, England

Playing information
- Position: Fullback, Centre
Club
Years	Team	Pld	T	G	FG	P
≤1979–≥86	Hull Kingston Rovers	126+35	25	19	0	143

Ian Robinson is a former professional rugby league footballer who played in the 1970s and 1980s. He played at club level for Hull Kingston Rovers, as a fullback or centre.

== Playing career ==
=== Rugby League Championship ===
Ian Robinson played in Hull Kingston Rovers Championship winning teams of the 1978–79 season, 1983–84 season and 1984–85 season

=== Premiership Final Appearances ===
Ian Robinson appeared as a substitute in Hull Kingston Rovers' 18-10 victory over Castleford Tigers in the Final of the 1983-84 Rugby League Premiership during the 1983–84 season.

Ian Robinson played right-centre in Hull Kingston Rovers' 36-16 defeat against St Helens in the Final of the 1984-85 Rugby League Premiership during the 1984-85 season

=== County Cup Final appearances ===
Ian Robinson played fullback in Hull Kingston Rovers' 7-8 defeat by Leeds in the 1980–81 Yorkshire Cup Final during the 1980–81 season at Fartown Ground, Huddersfield on Saturday 8 November 1980.

Ian Robinson played right-centre and scored a try in the 12-29 defeat by Hull F.C. in the 1984–85 Yorkshire Cup Final during the 1984–85 season at Boothferry Park, Kingston upon Hull on Saturday 27 October 1984.

=== BBC2 Floodlit Trophy Final appearances ===
Ian Robinson played fullback in Hull Kingston Rovers' 3-13 defeat by Hull F.C. in the 1979 BBC2 Floodlit Trophy Final during the 1979–80 season at The Boulevard, Kingston upon Hull on Tuesday 18 December 1979.

=== John Player Special Trophy Final appearances ===
Ian Robinson played right-centre in Hull Kingston Rovers' 12-0 victory over Hull F.C. in the 1984–85 John Player Special Trophy Final during the 1984–85 season at Boothferry Park, Kingston upon Hull on Saturday 26 January 1985.

Ian Robinson appeared as a substitute (replacing Prop Peter Johnston on 74-minutes) in the 8-11 defeat by Wigan in the 1985–86 John Player Special Trophy Final during the 1985–86 season at Elland Road, Leeds on Saturday 11 January 1986.

=== Testimonial match ===
Ian Robinson's Testimonial match at Hull Kingston Rovers took place in 1984.
