= John Dorahy =

Australian RL coach and former rugby league footballer

Personal information
- Full name: John Kevin Dorahy
- Born: 28 August 1954 (age 72) Wollongong, New South Wales, Australia

Playing information
- Height: 183 cm (6 ft 0 in)
- Weight: 83 kg (13 st 1 lb)
- Position: Fullback, Centre
Club
Years	Team	Pld	T	G	FG	P
1971–73	Wests (Illawarra)
1973	Leigh
1974–79	Western Suburbs	102	29	228	2	545
1980–81	Manly-Warringah	26	6	19	1	57
1982–85	Illawarra Steelers	74	14	204	5	463
1983–87	Hull Kingston Rovers	91	37	218	4	588
1987–89	North Sydney	37	6	102	3	231
1989–90	Halifax	23	2	8	0	24
	Total	353	94	779	15	1908
Representative
Years	Team	Pld	T	G	FG	P
1972–88	Country Origin	3	2	7	0	20
1978	Australia	2	1	0	0	3
1979	New South Wales	2	0	6	0	12

Coaching information
Club
Years	Team	Gms	W	D	L	W%
1989–90	Halifax
1993–94	Wigan	43	35	0	8	81
1996–97	Warrington	30	15	0	15	50
	Total	73	50	0	23	68
- Relatives: Dane Dorahy (son)

John Kevin Dorahy (born 28 August 1954), also known by the nickname of "Joe Cool", is an Australian former professional rugby league footballer and coach. He played in the Australian New South Wales Rugby League premiership and also represented for NSW Country, New South Wales Origin and Australia. Dorahy later played and coached in the English Championship, and coached in the Super League. He began his playing career at fullback and in later years moved into the centres. As coach of Wigan, he is one of a select few to have a guided his club to the league championship and Challenge Cup 'double'.

== Playing career ==
=== Australian Club Career ===
Starting out as a fullback for Wests Wollongong in 1971, Dorahy won the Illawarra competition in '71 and '72 and was selected to represent for NSW Country in '72 and '73 before moving to England. With his cousin, Tony, Dorahy had a year playing league in England with the Leigh club before returning to Australia and a contract with Western Suburbs Magpies in 1974. In 102 games with Wests from 1974 to 1979, Dorahy earned a reputation for his kick and chase and solid defence. He obtained his nickname Joe Cool due to his calm attitude under pressure.

In 1980, Dorahy moved to Manly but was only able to play 26 matches over the two seasons due to knee and neck injuries.

In 1982, a combined team from the South Coast was admitted to the New South Wales Rugby League premiership competition. Dorahy returned to Wollongong to captain the new team, the Illawarra Steelers, in its début year. Over his four seasons with the club, Dorahy scored 463 points (taking the club record for most goals in a season with 76 1983), but despite a promising season for the club in 1984 under young coach Brian Smith, off the field financial realities of the times hit hard, with players seeking employment outside the Steel city and the Steelers finished with the wooden spoon in the 1985 competition.

Dorahy headed back to England at the end of the 1983 NSWRL season and played during the northern winter for Hull Kingston Rovers, he was a member of the fine Rovers side of the mid-80s competing for all of the major honours in the British game, although he was unable to play in UK in the 1984–85 season .

Leaving Illawarra at the conclusion of their disappointing 1985 season, Dorahy spent a further two seasons with Hull Kingston Rovers. In 1987, at an age when most players would be considering retirement, he returned to Australia and took up the fullback position at Norths, playing his first game with them in round 10.

In 1989, Dorahy was on the move again, taking up a position as captain-coach of Halifax during the 1989–1990 season. It was his last season as a professional player and the beginning of his career in coaching.

Dorahy did play again in 2004, as part of the Rugby League Sevens tournament's Men of League team, alongside other retirees including Brett Kenny, "Mary" McGregor, Allan Langer and Russell Fairfax in an exhibition match.

=== Hull Kingston Rovers ===
Dorahy played in Hull Kingston Rovers Championship winning team of the 1983–84 season

Dorahy played stand-off in Hull Kingston Rovers' 14–15 defeat by Castleford in the 1986 Challenge Cup Final during the 1985–86 season at Wembley Stadium, London, on Saturday 3 May 1986, famously missing a late conversion which would have won the cup for Rovers in front of a crowd of 82,134.

Dorahy played right-centre and scored 5-goals in Hull Kingston Rovers' 22–18 victory over Castleford in the 1985 Yorkshire Cup Final during the 1985–86 season at Headingley, Leeds on Sunday 27 October 1985.

Dorahy played left-centre in Hull Kingston Rovers' 8–11 defeat by Wigan in the 1985–86 John Player Special Trophy Final during the 1985–86 season at Elland Road, Leeds on Saturday 11 January 1986.

Dorahy played stand-off in Hull Kingston Rovers' 18–10 victory over Castleford Tigers in the Final of the 1983-84 Rugby League Premiership during the 1983–84 season, scoring a try and a goal in the final.

Dorahy was awarded The Harry Sunderland Trophy as Man of the Match.

=== Halifax ===
Dorahy played stand-off, and was captain in Halifax' 12–24 defeat by Wigan in the 1989–90 Regal Trophy Final during the 1989–90 season at Headingley, Leeds on Saturday 13 January 1990.

== Representative career ==
In 1978 Dorahy was selected for the Australian national side for a two-test series against New Zealand but injury kept him out of the 1978 Kangaroo tour later in the year.

In 1979, Dorahy was selected as a centre for two New South Wales matches, one against the touring Great Britain team. Dorahy landed four goals on that occasion but the Blues lost by 19–17 after leading 12–1 at half-time.

When Country Origin fullback, Garry Jack, was suspended and pulled from the team in 1988, John Dorahy was called up to replace him. Dorahy's original Country selection had been in 1972, a span of sixteen years between games. Dorahy (along with Ricky Walford, 1990, and Chris Hicks, 2001) holds the record for points scored in a City vs Country Origin match, with fourteen points scored in the 1988 game.

== Coaching career ==
Dorahy has had two appointments as head coach at first-grade level, both in England and both ending after a relatively short term.

In June 1993, Dorahy took on his first head coach role after accepting the position at Wigan, succeeding John Monie.

Dorahy was the coach in Wigan' 12–24 defeat by Castleford in the 1993–94 Regal Trophy Final during the 1993–94 season at Headingley, Leeds on Saturday 22 January 1994.

Despite supervising Wigan through to the Challenge Cup, Championship and the Premiership, Dorahy was dismissed in May 1994, only days after the club's return from Wembley. In a statement by the club, Dorahy was said to have been sacked for "gross misconduct". While describing his sacking as "diabolical", Dorahy admitted there were signs of unrest with rumours of his lack of popularity amongst the players and the appointment of Dean Bell, the club captain, to a coaching assistant's role the previous month.

Dorahy's stint at Warrington in 1996–1997 was less successful, as far as match results were concerned, than at Wigan, with Warrington sitting on the bottom of the Super League ladder. Dorahy resigned in March 1997, before the end of the season.

In Australia, Dorahy was an assistant coach at the Newcastle Knights from 1991–1993 under David Waite and at the Western Reds from 1995–1996 under Peter Mulholland. In December 2005, Dorahy was appointed coach of the Western Suburbs Magpies premier league team.

== Honours ==
As a player

- Championship Winner - 1983/84
- Yorkshire Cup Winner - 1985/86
- Premiership Winner - 1983/84

As a coach

- Rugby League Championship Winner 1993/94
- Challenge Cup Winner 1993/94

== Recognition ==
In 2004, Dorahy was nominated for the Wests Magpies Team of the Century, finishing with a position on the bench next to Tom Raudonikis. The Illawarra Steelers announced the Team of Steel as part of their 25th anniversary celebrations in 2006 with Dorahy as captain and fullback. While he didn't make the final team, Dorahy was nominated for a position at centre in the Wests Tigers (combined Western Suburbs Magpies and Balmain Tigers teams) Team of the Century in 2007.

Dorahy is the father of Dane Dorahy who is also a former professional rugby league footballer.

== Business career ==
Dorahy has been a member of the Board of Directors of the Wests Illawarra Leagues Club since 2001. Dorahy has also been a director of Leagues Clubs Australia.

Dorahy has been significantly involved in the poker machine and hotels industry. He has held positions from Sales Manager at Stargames to Business Development Director at Nanoptix and Aristocrat. He is currently Business Development Director at CashCode, a poker machine parts manufacturer.

== Political career ==
On 31 October 2010, the NSW Liberal Party confirmed that Dorahy would be the Liberal Party candidate for the seat of Keira at the March 2011 NSW State Election. He was unsuccessful. However, despite changing Keira from a safe ALP seat to a marginal ALP seat, Dorahy did not contest the seat again at the 2015 election. He also contested the September 2011 Wollongong City Council election, where he was elected to represent Wollongong's Ward 2, and was elected to be Deputy Lord Mayor for two terms (2012–13 and 2015–17). Dorahy was re-elected for a three-year term as a councillor for Ward 2 at the council election held on 9 September 2017.

In August 2024 Dorahy was not renominated by the NSW branch of the Liberal Party for the upcoming state-wide local government elections.

Civic offices
Preceded by David Brown	Deputy Lord Mayor of Wollongong; 2012–2013	Succeeded by Chris Connor
Preceded by Chris Connor	Deputy Lord Mayor of Wollongong; 2015–2017	Succeeded by TBD
