= Chris Burton (rugby league) =

GB international rugby league footballer (born 1956)

Personal information
- Full name: Christopher Burton
- Born: 5 October 1956 (age 69)

Playing information
- Position: Second-row
Club
Years	Team	Pld	T	G	FG	P
1974–78	Leeds
1978–81	Huddersfield	15
1981–89	Hull Kingston Rovers	229	25	0	0	89
1989–94	Featherstone Rovers	130	5	0	0	20
	Total	374	30	0	0	109
Representative
Years	Team	Pld	T	G	FG	P
1982–87	Great Britain	9	0	0	0	0
1985–87	Yorkshire	3	0	0	0	0

Christopher Burton (born 5 October 1956) is a former professional rugby league footballer who played in the 1970s, 1980s and 1990s. He played at representative level for Great Britain and Yorkshire, and at club level for Leeds, Huddersfield, Hull Kingston Rovers and Featherstone Rovers, as a second-row.

== Playing career ==
=== Leeds ===
Chris Burton played at second-row in Leeds' 15–6 victory over Featherstone Rovers in the 1976 Yorkshire Cup Final during the 1976–77 season at Headingley, Leeds on Saturday 16 October 1976, in front of a crowd of 7,645

He was signed by Huddersfield in 1978.

=== Hull Kingston Rovers ===
Burton was transferred to Hull Kingston Rovers from Huddersfield in February 1981 for a fee of £15,000. He played at second-row and scored a try in Hull Kingston Rovers' 9-18 defeat by Widnes in the 1981 Challenge Cup Final during the 1980–81 season at Wembley Stadium, London on Saturday 2 May 1981, in front of a crowd of 92,496. He appeared as a substitute in the 11-7 victory over neighbours Hull F.C. in the Final of the 1980-81 Rugby League Premiership.

Chris Burton appeared as a substitute (replacing Scrum-half Paul Harkin) in Hull Kingston Rovers' 4-12 defeat by Hull F.C. in the 1981–82 John Player Trophy Final during the 1981–82 season at Headingley, Leeds on Saturday 23 January 1982, in front of a crowd of 25,245.

Burton played second-row in Hull Kingston Rovers' 8–6 victory over Queensland as they toured Papua New Guinea and England during the 1983–84 Rugby Football League season. He also played second-row in Hull Kingston Rovers' 18–10 victory over Castleford Tigers in the Final of the 1983-84 Rugby League Premiership.

Burton played at second-row in Hull Kingston Rovers' 12-29 defeat by Hull F.C. in the 1984 Yorkshire Cup Final during the 1984–85 season at Boothferry Park, Kingston upon Hull on Saturday 27 October 1984, in front of a crowd of 25,237. Burton played at second-row in the 12-0 victory over Hull F.C. in the 1984–85 John Player Special Trophy Final at Boothferry Park, Kingston upon Hull on Saturday 26 January 1985, in front of a crowd of 25,326.

Burton was a member of the Hull Kingston Rovers Championship winning squads of 1983–84 Rugby Football League season & 1984–85 Rugby Football League season

Burton played at second-row in the 22-18 victory over Castleford in the 1985 Yorkshire Cup Final during the 1985–86 season at Headingley, Leeds on Sunday 27 October 1985, in front of a crowd of 12,686. Burton played at second-row in the 8-11 defeat by Wigan in the 1985–86 John Player Special Trophy Final at Elland Road, Leeds on Saturday 11 January 1986, in front of a crowd of 17,573.

=== Featherstone Rovers ===
Chris Burton was transferred from Hull Kingston Rovers to Featherstone Rovers in exchange for Paul Lyman plus a fee to Featherstone Rovers, he made his début for Featherstone Rovers on Sunday 15 January 1989.

=== Representative honours ===
Chris Burton won caps for Great Britain while at Hull Kingston Rovers in 1982 against Australia, in 1984 against Australia (3 matches), and New Zealand (2 matches), in 1985 against New Zealand (sub), in 1986 against Australia, in 1987 against France.

Chris Burton represented Yorkshire in games against Lancashire in 1985 and 1987 and against Papua New Guinea in 1987.
