= Mike Smith (rugby league) =

Great Britain and England international rugby league footballer (born 1958)

Personal information
- Full name: Michael Smith
- Born: 26 January 1958 (age 68) Hull, England

Playing information
- Position: Centre, Stand-off
Club
Years	Team	Pld	T	G	FG	P
1974–91	Hull Kingston Rovers	489	140	2	3	493
1991–92	Doncaster	14	3	0	0	12
	Total	503	143	2	3	505
Representative
Years	Team	Pld	T	G	FG	P
1980–81	England	5	0	0	0	0
1979–84	Great Britain	11	3	0	0	9

Michael Smith (26 January 1958) is an English professional rugby league footballer who played in the 1970s, 1980s, and 1990s. He played at representative level for Great Britain and England, and at club level for Hull Kingston Rovers, as a centre or stand-off.

== Background ==
Smith has worked as a rigger.

== Playing career ==
=== Club career ===
Smith spent the vast majority of his professional career with Hull Kingston Rovers, he is the club's appearance record holder, having played 489 games between 1975 and 1991.

Smith made his debut for Hull KR on Good Friday in March 1975 against Barrow.

Mike Smith played at centre and scored a try in Hull Kingston Rovers' 26–11 victory over St. Helens in the 1977 BBC2 Floodlit Trophy Final during the 1977–78 season at Craven Park, Hull on Tuesday 13 December 1977

During the 1979–80 season, Mike Smith played at centre in the 3–13 defeat by Hull F.C. in the 1979 BBC2 Floodlit Trophy Final at The Boulevard, Hull on Tuesday 18 December 1979. He also played at centre in Hull Kingston Rovers' 10–5 victory over Hull F.C. in the 1979–80 Challenge Cup Final during the 1979–80 season at Wembley Stadium, London on Saturday 3 May 1980, in front of a crowd of 95,000.

During the 1980–81 season, Mike Smith played at centre in Hull Kingston Rovers' 7–8 defeat by Leeds in the 1980–81 Yorkshire Cup Final at Fartown Ground, Huddersfield on Saturday 8 November 1980. He also played at centre in the 9–18 defeat by Widnes in the 1980–81 Challenge Cup Final at Wembley Stadium, London on Saturday 2 May 1981, in front of a crowd of 92,496. He played at centre and scored a try in Hull Kingston Rovers' 11–7 victory over Hull F.C. in the Final of the 1980–81 Rugby League Premiership.

Smith played at centre in Hull Kingston Rovers' 4–12 defeat by Hull F.C. in the 1981–82 John Player Trophy Final during the 1981–82 season at Headingley, Leeds on Saturday 23 January 1982.

Mike Smith played at centre and scored the match winning try in Hull Kingston Rovers' 8–6 victory over Queensland as they toured Papua New Guinea and England part of the 1983–84 Rugby Football League season. He played at centre and scored a try in Hull Kingston Rovers' 18–10 victory over Castleford Tigers in the Final of the 1983–84 Rugby League Premiership.

He played stand-off in the 12–29 defeat by Hull F.C. in the 1984–85 Yorkshire Cup Final during the 1984–85 season at Boothferry Park, Kingston upon Hull on Saturday 27 October 1984. He also played stand-off in the 12–0 victory over Hull F.C. in the 1984–85 John Player Special Trophy Final during the 1984–85 season at Boothferry Park, Kingston upon Hull on Saturday 26 January 1985. He played in the 36–16 defeat against St Helens in the Final of the 1984–85 Rugby League Premiership.

Smith played at centre in the 8–11 defeat by Wigan in the 1985–86 John Player Special Trophy Final during the 1985–86 season at Elland Road, Leeds on Saturday 11 January 1986. He also played at centre in the 14–15 defeat by Castleford in the 1985-86 Challenge Cup Final during the 1985–86 season at Wembley Stadium, London, on Saturday 3 May 1986, in front of a crowd of 82,134.

Smith's Testimonial match at Hull Kingston Rovers took place in 1986.

In 1991, Smith was given a free transfer and joined Third Division side Doncaster for the 1991–92 season. He retired as a player in 1992, and joined the coaching staff at Hull FC.

In 2018, Smith was named as Hull KR's club president.

=== Representative honours ===
Smith won caps for England while at Hull Kingston Rovers in 1980 against Wales, and France, in 1981 against France, and Wales (2 matches), and won caps for Great Britain while at Hull Kingston Rovers in 1979 against New Zealand (3 matches & 2 Tries), in 1980 against New Zealand (2 matches & 1 Try), in 1981 against France (2 matches), in 1982 against Australia (2 matches), and in 1984 against France (sub), and New Zealand.

In addition to the above Test matches, Mike Smith played at centre in Great Britain's 7–8 defeat by France in the friendly at Stadio Pier Luigi Penzo, Venice on Saturday 31 July 1982.

Smith was selected to take part in the Great Britain Tours of Australia, New Zealand & PNG in 1979 and 1984.

Mike Smith also represented Yorkshire against Lancashire in 1978.

== Honours ==
Great Britain Lions Tourist – 1979, 1984

Challenge Cup Winner – 1979/80 (R/Up – 1980/81, 1985/86)

Rugby League Championship Winner – 1978/79, 1983/84, 1984/85 (R/Up – 1982/83)

John Player Trophy Winner – 1984/85 (R/Up 1981/82, 1985/86)

Rugby League Premiership Trophy – 1980/81, 1983/84 (R/Up – 1984/85)

BBC2 Trophy – 1977/78 (R/Up – 1979/80)

Yorkshire Cup – 1985/86 (R/Up- 1980/81, 1984/85)

Charity Shield – R/Up 1985

Division Two Championship – 1989/90

Hull KR Player of The Year- 1981/82

Hull KR Record Appearance Holder 1974 -1991 (Heritage No 779)
