= Stuart Horton =

English RL coach and former rugby league footballer

Personal information
- Full name: Stuart Horton
- Born: 10 September 1963 (age 62) England

Playing information
- Position: Hooker
Club
Years	Team	Pld	T	G	FG	P
1981–87	Castleford	80	10	0	0	40
1987–94	York	214	27	0	11	119
	Total	294	37	0	11	159

Coaching information
Club
Years	Team	Gms	W	D	L	W%
1994–96	York

Stuart Horton (born 10 September 1963), also known by the nickname of "Corgi", is an English former professional rugby league footballer who played in the 1980s and 1990s, and coached in the 1990s. He played at club level for Castleford and York, as a hooker, and coached at club level for York.

== Playing career ==
=== Challenge Cup Final appearances ===
Horton appeared as a substitute (replacing hooker Kevin Beardmore) in Castleford's 15–14 victory over Hull Kingston Rovers in the 1986 Challenge Cup Final during the 1985–86 season at Wembley Stadium, London on Saturday 3 May 1986, in front of a crowd of 82,134.

=== County Cup Final appearances ===
Horton played as a hooker in Castleford's 2–13 defeat by Hull F.C. in the 1983 Yorkshire Cup Final during the 1983–84 season at Elland Road, Leeds on Saturday 15 October 1983.
