= 1985–86 Challenge Cup =

Rugby league competition

1985–86 Silk Cut Challenge Cup
- Duration: 6 Rounds
- Number of teams: 36
- Highest attendance: 32,485 Hull KR v Leeds Semi-final Replay
- Lowest attendance: 422 Blackpool v Runcorn 1st Round
- Broadcast partners: BBC
- Winners: Castleford
- Runners-up: Hull Kingston Rovers
- Biggest home win: 62-11 Warrington v Sheffield Eagles 1st Round
- Biggest away win: 60-6 Hunslet v Castleford 1st Round
- Lance Todd Trophy: Bob Beardmore

The 1985–86 Challenge Cup was the 85th staging of rugby league's oldest knockout competition, the Challenge Cup. Known as the Silk Cut Challenge Cup for sponsorship reasons,. The Preliminary, 1st and 2nd rounds. and Quarter-finals was hit by the Winter of 1985-86 in Great Britain and Ireland with the preliminary round ties not being completed until 31 January and the 1st Round not being completed until 26 February and the first round had a major upset in the form of 2nd Division Doncaster knocking out 1st Division Salford winning 18-12 at home however only 842 spectators were there to see it and only 2 2nd Round ties being played on 23 February with 1 1st Round tie being played the day before on 22 February in front of the BBC Grandstand cameras the other 2 being played on 24 and 26 February and the remaining 2nd Round ties being played between 8–12 March 1986 (including a replay). This meant that the Quarter-finals were not played until 16 March 1986 (with a replay on 19 March 1986) with no television coverage (though highlights of the Leeds v Widnes replay on 19 March was shown on Sportsnight) this led to the Last 16, Quarter-finals and the Semi-finals being played on consecutive weekends for the first time in the Challenge Cup's 89-year history. The final on 3 May 1986 was contested by Castleford and Hull Kingston Rovers at Wembley. Castleford won the match 15–14.

== Preliminary round ==
Tie no	Date	Home team	Score	Away team	Attendance
1	26 January 1986	Hunslet	20–8	Kells	1,200
2	29 January 1986	Hull	38–10	Dudley Hill	2,590
3	30 January 1986	Swinton	8–30	Leeds	1,348
4	31 January 1986	Carlisle	20–14	Mansfield Marksman	482

== First round ==
Tie no	Date	Home team	Score	Away team	Attendance
1	8 February 1986	Hull Kingston Rovers	22–6	Hull	8,770
2	9 February 1986	Blackpool Borough	30–10	Runcorn Highfield	422
3	9 February 1986	Doncaster	18–12	Salford	842
4	9 February 1986	Featherstone Rovers	14–18	Widnes	2,378
5	9 February 1986	Halifax	4–24	Leeds	7,422
6	9 February 1986	Huddersfield	4–10	Rochdale Hornets	913
7	9 February 1986	Hunslet	6–60	Castleford	2,358
8	9 February 1986	Keighley	2–24	Leigh	1,968
9	9 February 1986	Oldham	56–10	Carlisle	2,785
10	9 February 1986	Warrington	62–11	Sheffield Eagles	2,347
11	9 February 1986	Workington Town	12–56	Wigan	6,346
12	9 February 1986	York	18–6	Whitehaven	2,339
13	16 February 1986	Bramley	8–6	Batley	1,050
14	22 February 1986	Bradford Northern	10–8	Wakefield Trinity	2,649
15	24 February 1986	Dewsbury	19–22	St. Helens	1,948
16	26 February 1986	Fulham	4–17	Barrow	1,220

== Second round ==
Tie no	Date	Home team	Score	Away team	Attendance
1	23 February 1986	Doncaster	10–28	Leeds	7,636
2	23 February 1986	Widnes	36–20	Rochdale Hornets	3,706
3	8 March 1986	Wigan	24–14	St. Helens	18,553
4	9 March 1986	Barrow	6–30	Castleford	3,613
5	9 March 1986	Bradford Northern	20–20	Bramley	3,037
Replay	12 March 1986	Bramley	2–36	Bradford Northern	3,014
6	9 March 1986	Leigh	31–10	Blackpool Borough	3,241
7	9 March 1986	Oldham	13–6	Warrington	6,526
8	9 March 1986	York	6–34	Hull Kingston Rovers	5,694

== Third round ==
Tie no	Date	Home team	Score	Away team	Attendance
1	16 March 1986	Hull Kingston Rovers	25–10	Leigh	7,928
2	16 March 1986	Oldham	6–1	Bradford Northern	6,962
3	16 March 1986	Widnes	10–10	Leeds	8,141
Replay	19 March 1986	Leeds	5–0	Widnes	15,710
4	16 March 1986	Wigan	2–10	Castleford	18,503

== Semi-final ==
22 March 1986

Castleford	18 – 7	Oldham
Try: Beardmore (2), Marchant; Goal: Ketteridge (3)	Report	Try: Liddiard; Goal: Hobbs; Drop goal: Ashton

Central Park, Wigan
Attendance: 12,430

29 March 1986

Leeds	24 – 24	Hull Kingston Rovers
Try: Currie (2), Creasser, Medley; Goal: Creasser (3); Drop goal: Lyons, Webb	Report	Try: Laws (2), Smith (2); Goal: Dorahy (4)

Elland Road, Leeds
Attendance: 23,866

=== Replay ===
3 April 1986

Hull Kingston Rovers	17 – 0	Leeds
Try: Johnston, Kelly, Lydiat; Goal: Dorahy (2); Drop goal: Harkin	Report

Elland Road, Leeds
Attendance: 32,485

== Final ==
3 May 1986

Castleford	15 – 14	Hull Kingston Rovers
Try: Beardmore, Marchant, Sandy; Goal: Ketteridge; Drop goal: Beardmore	Report	Try: Prohm (2), Lydiat; Goal: Dorahy

Wembley, London
Attendance: 82,134
Referee: Robin Whitfield (Widnes)
Player of the Match: Bob Beardmore

FB	1	Gary Lord
RW	2	David Plange
RC	3	Tony Marchant
LC	4	Gary Hyde
LW	5	Jamie Sandy
SO	6	John Joyner (c)
SH	7	Bob Beardmore
PR	8	Kevin Ward
HK	9	Kevin Beardmore
PR	10	Barry Johnson
SR	11	Keith England
SR	12	Martin Ketteridge
LF	13	Ian French
Substitutions:
IC	14	David Roockley
IC	15	Stuart Horton
Coach:
Mal Reilly

FB	1	George Fairbairn
RW	2	Garry Clark
RC	3	Mike Smith
LC	4	Gary Prohm
LW	5	David Laws
SO	6	John Dorahy
SH	7	Paul Harkin
PR	8	Peter Johnston
HK	9	David Watkinson (c)
PR	10	Asuquo Ema
SR	11	Andy Kelly
SR	12	Des Harrison
LF	13	Gavin Miller
Substitutions:
IC	14	Gordon Smith
IC	15	John Lydiat
Coach:
Roger Millward
