= 1985–86 John Player Special Trophy =

- Structure: National knockout championship
- Teams: 36
- Winners: Wigan
- Runners-up: Hull Kingston Rovers

This was the fifteenth season of the competition. The League Cup was again known as the John Player Special Trophy this season for sponsorship reasons.

Wigan won the final, beating Hull Kingston Rovers by the score of 11-8. The match was played at Elland Road, Leeds. The attendance was 17,573 and receipts were £66714.

== Background ==
This season saw several changes in the entrants :-
1 Bridgend Blue Dragons and Southend Invicta both folded
2 and the invitation to two junior clubs continued
This involved a decrease in entrants to thirty-six, in turn resulting in a 4 match, 8 club preliminary round to reduce the number of clubs taking part in the first round proper to thirty-two
There were no drawn matches throughout the tournament

== Competition and results ==
=== Preliminary round ===
Involved 4 matches and 8 Clubs

Game No	Fixture Date	Home team	Score	Away team	Venue	Att	Rec	Notes	Ref
1	Sun 10 Nov 1985	Carlisle	6-24	Rochdale Hornets	Brunton Park	752			
2	Sun 10 Nov 1985	Featherstone Rovers	10-14	Warrington	Post Office Road	1803			
3	Sun 10 Nov 1985	Keighley	24-6	Jubilee Hotel (Featherstone)	Lawkholme Lane	1007		1	
4	Sun 10 Nov 1985	West Hull	10-24	Castleford	Boulevard	2500		2	

=== Round 1 - First Round ===
Involved 16 matches and 32 Clubs

Game No	Fixture Date	Home team	Score	Away team	Venue	Att	Rec	Notes	Ref
1	Sat 23 Nov 1985	Halifax	2-11	Hull Kingston Rovers	Thrum Hall	4147			
2	Sun 24 Nov 1985	Barrow	5-2	Leeds	Craven Park	4886			
3	Sun 24 Nov 1985	Batley	2-70	Leigh	Mount Pleasant	1543		3	
4	Sun 24 Nov 1985	Blackpool Borough	22-24	Wakefield Trinity	Borough Park	683			
5	Sun 24 Nov 1985	Bramley	8-46	Oldham	McLaren Field	2738			
6	Sun 24 Nov 1985	Doncaster	22-20	Runcorn Highfield	Bentley Road Stadium/Tattersfield	375			
7	Sun 24 Nov 1985	Fulham	13-20	Warrington	Chiswick Poly Sports Grd	1493			
8	Sun 24 Nov 1985	Hunslet	20-12	Workington Town	Elland Road	726			
9	Sun 24 Nov 1985	Keighley	20-10	Huddersfield Barracudas	Lawkholme Lane	1264		4	
10	Sun 24 Nov 1985	St. Helens	42-6	Dewsbury	Knowsley Road	5364			
11	Sun 24 Nov 1985	Salford	18-12	Rochdale Hornets	The Willows	2844			
12	Sun 24 Nov 1985	Sheffield Eagles	16-24	Bradford Northern	Owlerton Stadium	1342			
13	Sun 24 Nov 1985	Whitehaven	7-12	Widnes	Recreation Ground	3097			
14	Sun 24 Nov 1985	Wigan	26-0	Mansfield Marksman	Central Park	10040		5	
15	Sun 24 Nov 1985	York	12-10	Castleford	Clarence Street	3765			
16	Sun 27 Nov 1985	Hull F.C.	44-0	Swinton	Boulevard	3797			

=== Round 2 - Second Round ===
Involved 8 matches and 16 Clubs

Game No	Fixture Date	Home team	Score	Away team	Venue	Att	Rec	Notes	Ref
1	Sat 30 Nov 1985	Widnes	30-6	Bradford Northern	Naughton Park	2222			
2	Sun 1 Dec 1985	Hull F.C.	30-10	Salford	Boulevard	5659			
3	Sun 1 Dec 1985	Hull Kingston Rovers	8-7	Oldham	Craven Park (1)	7069			
4	Sun 1 Dec 1985	Leigh	48-6	Hunslet	Hilton Park	3267			
5	Sun 1 Dec 1985	St. Helens	36-20	Doncaster	Knowsley Road	4092			
6	Sun 1 Dec 1985	Wakefield Trinity	21-30	Wigan	Belle Vue	7360			
7	Sun 1 Dec 1985	Warrington	34-14	Barrow	Wilderspool	3705			
8	Sun 1 Dec 1985	York	21-16	Keighley	Clarence Street	2511			

=== Round 3 -Quarter Finals ===
Involved 4 matches with 8 clubs

Game No	Fixture Date	Home team	Score	Away team	Venue	Att	Rec	Notes	Ref
1	Sat 7 Dec 1985	Warrington	22-26	Wigan	Wilderspool	6737			
2	Sun 8 Dec 1985	Hull Kingston Rovers	24-16	York	Craven Park (1)	6228			
3	Sun 8 Dec 1985	Widnes	31-35	Leigh	Naughton Park	6153			
4	Wed 11 Dec 1985	St. Helens	57-14	Hull	Knowsley Road	7536			

=== Round 4 – Semi-Finals ===
Involved 2 matches and 4 Clubs

Game No	Fixture Date	Home team	Score	Away team	Venue	Att	Rec	Notes	Ref
1	Sat 14 Dec 1985	Wigan	36-8	Leigh	Knowsley Road	10509			
2	Sat 21 Dec 1985	Hull Kingston Rovers	22-4	St. Helens	Headingley	3856			

=== Final ===
11 January 1986

Wigan	11 – 8	Hull Kingston Rovers
Tries: Wane, Ford; Goals: Stephenson; Drop goals: Dowling		Tries: Lydiat, Laws

Elland Road, Leeds
Attendance: 17,573
Referee: John Holdsworth (Kippax)
Player of the Match: Paul Harkin

==== Teams and scorers ====
Wigan	№	Hull Kingston Rovers
	Teams	
Steve Hampson	1	John Lydiat
Ray Mordt	2	Garry Clark
David Stephenson	3	Mike Smith
Ellery Hanley	4	John Dorahy
Henderson Gill	5	David Laws
Steve Ella	6	Gordon Smith
Mike Ford	7	Paul Harkin
Greg Dowling	8	Peter Johnston
Nicky Kiss	9	David Watkinson
Shaun Wane	10	Asuquo "Zook" Ema
Graeme West	11	Chris Burton
Andy Goodway	12	Andy Kelly
Ian Potter	13	Gavin Miller
Shaun Edwards (for Henderson Gill on 74th minute)	14	Ian Robinson (for Peter Johnston 74 min)
Nick Du Toit (for Ian Potter Half Time)	15	? Not used
Colin Clarke and Alan McInnes	Coach	Roger Millward

=== Prize money ===
As part of the sponsorship deal and funds, the prize money awarded to the competing teams for this season is as follows :-

Finish Position	Cash prize	No. receiving prize	Total cash
Winner	?	1	?
Runner-up	?	1	?
semi-finalist	?	2	?
loser in Rd 3	?	4	?
loser in Rd 2	?	8	?
Loser in Rd 1	?	16	?
Loser in Prelim Round	?	?	?
Grand Total			

Note - the author is unable to trace the award amounts for this season. Can anyone help ?

=== The road to success ===
This tree excludes any preliminary round fixtures

First round
Fulham	13
Warrington	20
Barrow	5
Leeds	2
Blackpool Borough	22
Wakefield Trinity	24
Wigan	26
Mansfield Marksman	0
Whitehaven	7
Widnes	12
Sheffield Eagles	16
Bradford Northern	24
Batley	2
Leigh	70
Hunslet	22
Workington Town	12
Halifax	2
Hull Kingston Rovers	11
Bramley	8
Oldham	46
York	12
Castleford	10
Keighley	20
Huddersfield Barracudas	10
St. Helens	42
Dewsbury	6
Doncaster	22
Runcorn Highfield	20
Hull	44
Swinton	0
Salford	18
Rochdale Hornets	12

Second round
Warrington	34
Barrow	14
Wakefield Trinity	21
Wigan	30
Widnes	30
Bradford Northern	6
Leigh	48
Hunslet	6
Hull Kingston Rovers	8
Oldham	7
York	21
Keighley	16
St. Helens	36
Doncaster	20
Hull	30
Salford	10

Third round
Warrington	22
Wigan	26
Widnes	31
Leigh	35
Hull Kingston Rovers	24
York	16
St. Helens	57
Hull	14

Semifinals
Wigan	36
Leigh	8
Hull Kingston Rovers	22
St. Helens	4

Final
Wigan	11
Hull Kingston Rovers	8

== Notes and comments ==
1 * Jubilee Hotel are a Junior (amateur) club from Featherstone
2 * West Hull are a Junior (amateur) club from Hull
3 * highest score, highest score by away team, and highest winning margin - all between professional clubs, to date
4 * RUGBYLEAGUEproject and Huddersfield Heritage give the score as 20-10 but Wigan official archives gives it as 20-18
5 * Mansfield Marksman have moved from Mansfield and are now playing at North Street, Alfreston
6 * Elland Road, Leeds, is the home ground of Leeds United A.F.C. with a capacity of 37,914 (The record attendance was 57,892 set on 15 March 1967 for a cup match Leeds v Sunderland). The ground was originally established in 1897 by Holbeck RLFC who played there until their demise after the conclusion of the 1903-04 season

== See also ==
- 1985–86 Rugby Football League season
- 1985 Lancashire Cup
- 1985 Yorkshire Cup
- John Player Special Trophy
- Rugby league county cups
