= 1984–85 John Player Special Trophy =

- Structure: National knockout championship
- Teams: 38
- Winners: Hull Kingston Rovers
- Runners-up: Hull F.C.

This was the fourteenth season for the League Cup, which was again known as the John Player Special Trophy for sponsorship purposes.

Hull Kingston Rovers claimed the trophy by beating their local rivals Hull F.C. by the score of 12–0 in the final. The match was played at Boothferry Park, Kingston upon Hull on 26 January 1985 and the attendance was 25,326. Gate receipts were £69,355 (equivalent to £215,000 in 2025).

== Background ==
This season saw several changes in the entrants:

1. Cardiff City Blue Dragons were renamed Bridgend Blue Dragons and Kent Invicta were renamed Southend Invicta
2. Mansfield Marksman and Sheffield Eagles joined the league and also the competition
3. Huyton changed their name to Runcorn Highfield and moved from Alt Park, Huyton to Canal Street, Runcorn
4. and the re-introduction of the invitation to two junior clubs.

This involved an increase in entrants to thirty-eight, in turn resulting in a six-match, 12-club preliminary round to reduce the number of clubs taking part in the first round proper to thirty-two.

== Competition and results ==
=== Preliminary round ===
Involved six matches and 12 clubs

Game No.	Fixture date	Home team	Score	Away team	Venue	Attend	Rec	Notes	Ref
1	Fri 2 Nov 1984	Myson (Hull)	2-8	Dewsbury	Boulevard			(Note: Myson are a Junior (amateur) club from Hull.)	
2	Sun 4 Nov 1984	Bramley	20-6	Southend Invicta	McLaren Field	572			
3	Sun 4 Nov 1984	Keighley	24-10	Bradford Dudley Hill	Lawkholme Lane	1570		(Note: Bradford Dudley Hill are a Junior (amateur) club from Bradford.), (Note: Rothmans Rugby League Yearbook 1990-1991 and 1991-92, and the Rugby League Project gives score as 24-10, but Wigan official archives gives it as 24-8)	
4	Sun 4 Nov 1984	Sheffield Eagles	17-6	Wakefield Trinity	Owlerton Stadium	1279		(Note: Rugby League Project and Wakefield Till I Die give the score as 17-6 but Wigan official archives gives it as 17-8)	
5	Wed 7 Nov 1984	Carlisle	8-26	Bradford Northern	Brunton Park	1215		(Note: This fixture not shown on Wigan official archives)	
6	Wed 7 Nov 1984	Hunslet	2-6	Workington Town	Elland Road	719			

=== Round 1 – First round ===
Involved 16 matches and 32 clubs

Game No	Fixture date	Home team	Score	Away team	Venue	Att	Rec	Notes	Ref
1	Sat 17 Nov 1984	Hull Kingston Rovers	32-5	Leigh	Craven Park (1)	4541		(Note: Rugby League Project give score as 32-5 but Wigan official archives gives it as 32-6)	
2	Sun 18 Nov 1984	Bradford Northern	22-1	Swinton	Odsal	3712			
3	Sun 18 Nov 1984	Bramley	12-10	Blackpool Borough	McLaren Field	653			
4	Sun 18 Nov 1984	Bridgend Blue Dragons	4-42	Castleford	Coychurch Road, Bridgend	1803		(Note: Rugby League Project give score as 4-42 but Wigan official archives gives it as 4-34)	
5	Sun 18 Nov 1984	Dewsbury	14-8	Salford	Crown Flatt	1176			
6	Sun 18 Nov 1984	Featherstone Rovers	17-12	Barrow	Post Office Road	1651			
7	Sun 18 Nov 1984	Fulham	14-36	Hull F.C.	Polytechnic of Central London	2324		(Note: Venue possibly Crystal Palace NSC or Chiswick Poly Sports Ground.)	
8	Sun 18 Nov 1984	Leeds	50-2	Sheffield Eagles	Headingley	4881			
9	Sun 18 Nov 1984	Rochdale Hornets	10-8	Mansfield Marksman	Athletic Grounds	620			
10	Sun 18 Nov 1984	Runcorn Highfield	18-5	Batley	Alt Park, Huyton	760			
11	Sun 18 Nov 1984	St. Helens	60-8	Keighley	Knowsley Road	5145			
12	Sun 18 Nov 1984	Warrington	5-17	Halifax	Wilderspool	4171			
13	Sun 18 Nov 1984	Whitehaven	64-0	Doncaster	Recreation Ground	1717		(Note: The highest winning margin to date between professional clubs.)	
14	Sun 18 Nov 1984	Wigan	50-6	Huddersfield Barracudas	Central Park	7375			
15	Sun 18 Nov 1984	Workington Town	12-22	Widnes	Derwent Park	1010			
16	Sun 18 Nov 1984	York	6-22	Oldham	Clarence Street	2504			

=== Round 2 – Second round ===
Involved 8 matches and 16 clubs

Game No	Fixture date	Home team	Score	Away team	Venue	Att	Rec	Notes	Ref
1	Sat 1 Dec 1984	Leeds	10-4	Wigan	Headingley	9261			
2	Sun 2 Dec 1984	Bradford Northern	12-12	St. Helens	Odsal	9419			
3	Sun 2 Dec 1984	Bramley	33-5	Whitehaven	McLaren Field	1358			
4	Sun 2 Dec 1984	Dewsbury	31-16	Runcorn Highfield	Crown Flatt	1242			
5	Sun 2 Dec 1984	Halifax	20-18	Castleford	Thrum Hall	4784			
6	Sun 2 Dec 1984	Hull F.C.	26-14	Oldham	Boulevard	11500		(Note: Rugby League Project and Hull official archives give score as 26-14 but Wigan official archives gives it as 23-14)	
7	Sun 2 Dec 1984	Hull Kingston Rovers	34-12	Rochdale Hornets	Craven Park (1)	4835			
8	Sun 2 Dec 1984	Widnes	28-10	Featherstone Rovers	Naughton Park	3850			

=== Round 2 – Second round replays ===
Involved one match and two clubs

Game No	Fixture date	Home team	Score	Away team	Venue	Attend	Rec	Notes	Ref
1	Wed 5 Dec 1984	St. Helens	24–10	Bradford Northern	Knowsley Road	10156			

=== Round 3 – Quarter-finals ===
Involved 4 matches with 8 clubs:

Game No	Fixture date	Home team	Score	Away team	Venue	Att	Rec	Notes	Ref
1	Sat 22 Dec 1984	St. Helens	8–14	Halifax	Knowsley Road	5,768			
2	Sun 23 Dec 1984	Dewsbury	8–22	Hull F.C.	Crown Flatt	7,197			
3	Sun 23 Dec 1984	Hull Kingston Rovers	14–6	Widnes	Craven Park	7,710			
4	Sun 23 Dec 1984	Leeds	28–14	Bramley	Headingley	6,404			

=== Round 4 – Semi-finals ===
Involved two matches and four clubs:

Game No	Fixture date	Home team	Score	Away team	Venue	Attend	Rec	Notes	Ref
1	Sat 29 Dec 1984	Hull Kingston Rovers	14–8	Halifax	Headingley	6,390			
2	Sat 5 Jan 1985	Hull F.C.	18–6	Leeds	Boothferry Park	13,214			

=== Final ===
1985 John Player Special Trophy Final

26 January 1985
12:00 GMT (UTC+0)

Hull F.C.	0 – 12	Hull Kingston Rovers
Tries: 0	1st: 0 – 8; 2nd: 0 – 4 Report	Tries: 3 Hogan 18'; Prohm 23'; Clark 72'; Goals: 0 Fairbairn (0/3)

Boothferry Park, Kingston upon Hull
Attendance: 25,326 (Note: The attendance at this final was a new record, which would never be beaten in the competition.)
Referee: Stanley Wall
Man of the Match: Paul Harkin (Hull Kingston Rovers)

Hull F.C.		Position	Hull Kingston Rovers	
1	Gary Kemble (substituted off) 21'	Fullback	1	George Fairbairn
2	Steve Evans	Wing	2	Garry Clark 72'
3	Fred Ah Kuoi	Centre	3	Ian Robinson
4	James Leuluai	Centre	4	Gary Prohm 23'
5	Dane O'Hara	Wing	5	David Laws
6	David Topliss (c)	Stand-off	6	Mike Smith
7	Peter Sterling	Scrum-half	7	Paul Harkin
8	Phil Edmonds (substituted off) 64'	Prop	8	Mark Broadhurst
9	Shaun Patrick	Hooker	9	David Watkinson (c)
10	Paul Rose	Prop	10	Asuquo Ema
11	Lee Crooks	Second-row	11	Chris Burton
12	Wayne Proctor	Second-row	12	Phil Hogan 18'
13	Gary Divorty	Loose forward	13	Gavin Miller
14	Garry Schofield (substituted on) 21'	Interchange	14	John Lydiat
15	Andy Dannatt (substituted on) 64'	Interchange	15	Len Casey
	(England) Arthur Bunting	Head coach		(England) Roger Millward

=== Prize money ===
As part of the sponsorship deal and funds, the prize money awarded to the competing teams for this season is as follows :-

Finish position	Cash prize	No. receiving prize	Total cash
Winner	?	1	?
Runner-up	?	1	?
semi-finalist	?	2	?
loser in Rd 3	?	4	?
loser in Rd 2	?	8	?
Loser in Rd 1	?	16	?
Loser in prelim round	?	?	?
Grand total			

=== The road to success ===
This tree excludes any preliminary round fixtures

First round
Hull Kingston Rovers	32
Leigh	5
Rochdale Hornets	10
Mansfield Marksman	8
Workington Town	12
Widnes	22
Featherstone Rovers	17
Barrow	12
Bradford Northern	22
Swinton	1
St. Helens	60
Keighley	8
Warrington	5
Halifax	17
Bridgend Blue Dragons	4
Castleford	42
Dewsbury	14
Salford	8
Runcorn Highfield	18
Batley	5
Fulham	14
Hull	36
York	6
Oldham	22
Leeds	50
Sheffield Eagles	2
Wigan	50
Huddersfield Barracudas	6
Bramley	12
Blackpool Borough	10
Whitehaven	64
Doncaster	0

Second round
Hull Kingston Rovers	35
Rochdale Hornets	12
Widnes	28
Featherstone Rovers	10
Bradford Northern	12 (10)
St. Helens	12 (24)
Halifax	20
Castleford	18
Dewsbury	31
Runcorn Highfield	16
Hull	26
Oldham	14
Leeds	10
Wigan	4
Bramley	33
Whitehaven	5

Third round
Hull Kingston Rovers	14
Widnes	6
St. Helens	8
Halifax	14
Dewsbury	8
Hull	22
Leeds	28
Bramley	14

Semi-finals
Hull Kingston Rovers	14
Halifax	8
Hull	18
Leeds	6

Final
Hull Kingston Rovers	12
Hull	0

== See also ==
- 1984–85 Rugby Football League season
- 1984 Lancashire Cup
- 1984 Yorkshire Cup
- John Player Special Trophy
- Rugby league county cups
