= Gavin Miller =

Australia international rugby league footballer

Personal information
- Full name: Gavin John Miller
- Born: 4 January 1960 (age 66) Inverell, New South Wales, Australia

Playing information
- Weight: 87 kg (13 st 10 lb)
- Position: centre, second-row, loose forward
Club
Years	Team	Pld	T	G	FG	P
1977–77	Western Suburbs	17	2	1	0	8
1978–79	Eastern Suburbs	13	0	0	0	0
1980–83	Cronulla-Sutherland	56	6	0	1	19
1984–84	Eastern Suburbs	11	0	0	0	0
1984–87	Hull Kingston Rovers	79	24	0	0	96
1986–92	Cronulla-Sutherland	124	6	0	0	24
1988–89	Hull Kingston Rovers	22	3	0	0	12
	Total	322	41	1	1	159
Representative
Years	Team	Pld	T	G	FG	P
1983–89	New South Wales	5	0	0	0	0
1989–89	NSW Country	1	0	0	0	0
1988–1988	Australia	2	2	0	0	8

Gavin John Miller (born 4 January 1960) is an Australian former rugby league footballer who played in the 1970s and 1980s. An Australian international and New South Wales State of Origin representative forward, he played the majority of his club football for the Cronulla-Sutherland Sharks, and is an Immortal of the club. He earned two successive Dally M Player of the Year awards in 1988 and 1989.

Miller's influence was at the helm of the Cronulla-Sutherland becoming Premiership contenders after having spent some years at the lower end of the ladder. During Miller's heyday, Australian selectors were often criticised for ignoring him, notwithstanding that Miller did not show the best of his skills in a badly beaten New South Wales side during the 1989 State of Origin series.

== Early life ==
Gavin Miller was born in Inverell, New South Wales.

== Career ==
Before his late-1980s fame, Miller had already a long career in rugby league. He began playing for Goulburn as a centre and was recommended to Western Suburbs in 1977. That year, he obtained a regular place in the team at the age of seventeen but was signed by Eastern Suburbs the following year. Miller did poorly for Easts in the following two years but Cronulla thought he had potential and signed him for 1980.

Still playing as a centre, Miller obtained a regular place in the Cronulla side and gradually showed he had exceptional ball skills as well as the ability to run which he had shown with Wests. Over his first four years at Cronulla he was moved into the forwards and did so well that by 1983 he was chosen to play for New South Wales. Miller did not fulfil expectations there and during the season was involved in a dispute with the Sharks' committee – he had said he would leave the financially crippled club if it did not win the KB Cup. The Sharks failed to do this, and Miller was sacked at the beginning of October. That November Miller was signed by his former club Eastern Suburbs but played so poorly that he was relegated so low as third grade, while the Roosters won only five first-grade games out of 24.

=== Hull Kingston Rovers career ===
After leaving Easts, Miller signed to English club Hull Kingston Rovers. During his three year stint with Hull KR, Miller received many awards.

Miller played loose forward in Hull Kingston Rovers 12–0 victory over Hull F.C. in the 1984–85 John Player Special Trophy final during the 1984–85 season at Boothferry Park, Kingston upon Hull on 26 January 1985.

Miller won the First Division Championship at Hull Kingston Rovers during the 1984–85 season.

Miller played loose forward, scored two tries, and was man of the match winning the White Rose Trophy in Hull Kingston Rovers' 22–18 victory over Castleford in the 1985 Yorkshire Cup final during the 1985–86 season at Headingley, Leeds on 27 October 1985.

Miller played in the 8–11 loss to Wigan in the 1985–86 John Player Special Trophy final during the 1985–86 season at Elland Road, Leeds on 11 January 1986.

Miller played in Hull Kingston Rovers' 14–15 loss to Castleford in the 1986 Challenge Cup final at Wembley Stadium, London, on 3 May 1986, in front of a crowd of 82,134.

Miller won the Man of Steel award for the 1985–86 Rugby Football League season.

List of Hull Kingston Rovers players Heritage No 834.

=== Return to Australia ===
Miller returned to Cronulla in 1986 a more mature player, and after a slow start to his second stint with the club, by 1988 Miller had become one of the most dominant players in the NSWRL. He had the ability to consistently offload and send players into gaps (despite being small for a forward at around 87 kilograms or 13 stone 10 pounds), and was at the helm of Cronulla winning fifteen of their last seventeen home-and-away matches, and claiming the club’s first minor premiership. Despite not playing for New South Wales against either Queensland or Great Britain, Miller's club form was enough that selectors did not ignore him for the Test against Papua New Guinea. In a world international rugby league record 70–8 win, Miller "launched countless raid on the Kumuls' line" and scored a try. He also played in the World Cup final against New Zealand, remarkably scoring a try once again, and in between was named as Man of the Match versus a "Rest of the World" team.

1989 was Miller's most successful year, and he monopolised the player-of-the-year awards like no other player except perhaps Peter Sterling and latterly Andrew Johns. His ball-playing skills were by now backed up with a kicking game that received praise in local gambling outlet the Down Under Punter, a high work-rate in defence and the ability to take the knocks that came from being a focal playmaker. He won not only the Dally M Player of the Year, but also the Rugby League Week Player of the Year and the Rothmans Medal. His form against Brisbane in the play-off for fifth was described as "mesmerising" and saw the Sharks win 38–14.

1990, with injuries contributing, saw Miller decline somewhat, though in two games against Balmain and South Sydney he showed he could still be as skilful as ever. At thirty, though, he was out of contention for the Kangaroo tour, and the following year, with the responsibility of captaincy, saw Miller decline further. In 1992, with the changing of the guard at Cronulla, he was surprisingly relegated to reserve grade, but still showed his old skill in patches when brought on for the first team, notably against North Sydney. It was inevitable, though, that Miller would soon retire, and he returned to Goulburn as captain-coach at the end of the year.

After his retirement from first grade rugby league, Miller was named as one of the five "immortals" of the Cronulla club.

=== Honours ===
Rugby League World Cup Winner 1988

Rugby League Championship Winner 1984/85

Challenge Cup R/Up 1985/86

John Player Trophy Winner 1984/85 (R/Up 1985/86)

Rugby League Premiership Trophy R/Up - 1984/85

Yorkshire Cup Winner - 1984/85

Rugby League 'Man of Steel' - 1986

Hull KR Player of The Year - 1986

White Rose Trophy - 1985

'Dally M Medal' Winner - 1988, 1989

Rothmans Medal Winner - 1989

=== Unique Achievement ===
Miller remains unique in having won the Man of the Match award in the 1985–1988 Rugby League World Cup Final against New Zealand in 1988, the Man of Steel award, the Dally M Awards Player of the Year, the Rugby League Week Player of the Year and the Rothmans Medal.

=== Matches and point scoring summary ===
Team	Years	Matches	Tries	Goals	Field Goals	Points
Wests	1977	17	2	1	0	8
Easts	1978-1979, 1984	19	0	0	0	0
Cronulla	1980-1983, 1986-1992	178	12	0	1	43
New South Wales	1983, 1989	5	0	0	0	0
Australia	1988	3	2	0	0	8
Hull KR	1984-1989	102	27	0	0	108
Total	1977-1992	324	43	1	1	159
