= Bob Beardmore =

English rugby league footballer (born 1960)

Personal information
- Full name: Robert Beardmore
- Born: 21 June 1960 (age 65) Castleford, West Riding of Yorkshire, England

Playing information
- Position: Scrum-half
Club
| Years | Team | Pld | T | G | FG | P |
|---|---|---|---|---|---|---|
| 1978–89 | Castleford | 293 | 99 | 518 | 9 | 1397 |
| 1989–91 | Leigh | 38+4 | 16 | 20 | 0 | 104 |
| | Total | 335 | 115 | 538 | 9 | 1501 |
- Relatives: Kevin Beardmore (brother)

Robert Beardmore (born 21 June 1960) is an English former professional rugby league footballer who played in the 1970s, 1980s and 1990s. He played at club level for Castleford and Leigh, as a goal-kicking scrum-half.

== Background ==
Bob Beardmore's birth was registered in Pontefract district, West Riding of Yorkshire, England.

== Playing career ==
=== Challenge Cup Final appearances ===
Bob Beardmore played scrum-half, scored a try, and a drop goal, and won the Lance Todd Trophy in Castleford's 15–14 victory over Hull Kingston Rovers in the 1986 Challenge Cup Final during the 1985–86 season at Wembley Stadium, London on Saturday 3 May 1986.

=== County Cup Final appearances ===
Bob Beardmore played scrum-half in Castleford's 10–5 victory over Bradford Northern in the 1981 Yorkshire Cup Final during the 1981–82 season at Headingley, Leeds on Saturday 3 October 1981, played scrum-half, and scored a goal in the 2–13 defeat by Hull F.C. in the 1983 Yorkshire Cup Final during the 1983–84 season at Elland Road, Leeds on Saturday 15 October 1983, played scrum-half, and scored a try, and 2-goals in the 18–22 defeat by Hull Kingston Rovers in the 1985 Yorkshire Cup Final during the 1985–86 season at Elland Road, Leeds on Sunday 27 October 1985, played scrum-half, and scored a drop goal in the 31–24 victory over Hull F.C. in the 1986 Yorkshire Cup Final during the 1986–87 season at Headingley, Leeds on Saturday 11 October 1986, appeared as a substitute (replacing Prop Alan Shillito) in the 12–12 draw with Bradford Northern in the 1987 Yorkshire Cup Final during the 1987–88 season at Headingley, Leeds on Saturday 17 October 1987, played scrum-half in the 2–11 defeat by Bradford Northern in the 1987 Yorkshire Cup Final replay during the 1987–88 season at Elland Road, Leeds on Saturday 31 October 1987, and played scrum-half, in the 12–33 defeat by Leeds in the 1988 Yorkshire Cup Final during the 1988–89 season at Elland Road, Leeds on Sunday 16 October 1988.

=== Testimonial match ===
Bob Beardmore's Testimonial match at Castleford took place in 1988.

=== Career records ===
Bob Beardmore's holds Castleford's "Most Points in a Season" record with 334-points scored in the 1983–84 season.

== Honoured at Castleford Tigers ==
Bob Beardmore is a Tigers Hall Of Fame Inductee.

== Genealogical information ==
Bob Beardmore is the twin brother of the rugby league footballer, Kevin Beardmore, and the younger brother of Kenneth Beardmore, and Janet Beardmore.
