= Peter Johnston (rugby league, born 1963) =

Australian rugby league footballer

Personal information
- Full name: Peter Johnston
- Born: 4 June 1963 (age 63)

Playing information
- Position: Prop, Second-row
Club
Years	Team	Pld	T	G	FG	P
1984–86	Canterbury-Bankstown	16	1	3	0	10
1985–86	Hull KR	20	1	0	0	4
1987–88	Eastern Suburbs	20	1	0	0	4
1989–91	Newcastle Knights	45	5	16	0	52
	Total	101	8	19	0	70

Peter "Magic" Johnston (born 4 April 1963) is a former professional rugby league footballer who played in the 1980s, and 1990s. He played for the Canterbury Bulldogs from 1984 to 1986, Hull Kingston Rovers, the Eastern Suburbs Roosters from 1987 to 1988 and finally the Newcastle Knights from 1989 to 1991.

== UK Playing career ==
=== Challenge Cup Final appearances ===
Peter Johnston played at prop in Hull Kingston Rovers' 14–15 defeat by Castleford in the 1986 Challenge Cup Final during the 1985-86 season at Wembley Stadium, London, on Saturday 3 May 1986, in front of a crowd of 82,134.

=== Yorkshire Cup Final appearances ===
Peter Johnston played at prop in Hull Kingston Rovers' 22-18 victory over Castleford in the 1985 Yorkshire Cup Final during the 1985-86 season at Headingley Stadium, Leeds, on Sunday 27 October 1985, in front of a crowd of 12,686.

=== John Player Special Trophy Final appearances ===
Peter Johnston played at prop (replaced by substitute Ian Robinson on 74-minutes) in Hull Kingston Rovers' 8-11 defeat by Wigan in the 1985–86 John Player Special Trophy Final during the 1985–86 season at Elland Road, Leeds on Saturday 11 January 1986.
