= Jamie Sandy =

Australian rugby league footballer

Personal information
- Born: 18 January 1963 (age 62); Australia

Playing information
- Position: Fullback, Wing
Club
Years	Team	Pld	T	G	FG	P
≤1985–≤85	Wests Panthers
≤1985–85	Eastern Suburbs Tigers
1985–86	Castleford	18	4	0	0	16
≥1986–≥86	Redcliffe Dolphins
	Total	18	4	0	0	16

Jamie Sandy (born 18 January 1963) is an Australian former professional rugby league footballer who played in the 1980s. He played at club level for Wests Panthers, Eastern Suburbs Tigers, Castleford and Redcliffe Dolphins, as a fullback, scrum half or wing.

== Playing career ==
=== Brisbane Rugby League ===
Jamie Sandy played as scrum half i.e. number 7 in Redcliffe Dolphins loss to Brisbane Brothers in the 1987 BRL Winfield Cup Grand Final.

=== Challenge Cup Final appearances ===
Jamie Sandy played on the wing and scored a try in Castleford's 15–14 victory over Hull Kingston Rovers in the 1986 Challenge Cup Final during the 1985–86 season at Wembley Stadium, London on Saturday 3 May 1986.
