= Barry Johnson (rugby league) =

English rugby league footballer

Playing information
- Position: Prop
Club
Years	Team	Pld	T	G	FG	P
1979–89	Castleford	222	22	1	0	77
Representative
Years	Team	Pld	T	G	FG	P
1982	Great Britain U-24	2	0	0	0	0

Barry Johnson is a former professional rugby league footballer who played in the 1970s and 1980s. He played at club level for Castleford, as a prop.

== Playing career ==
=== Challenge Cup Final appearances ===
Barry Johnson played at prop in Castleford's 15-14 victory over Hull Kingston Rovers in the 1986 Challenge Cup Final during the 1985–86 season at Wembley Stadium, London on Saturday 3 May 1986.

=== County Cup Final appearances ===
Johnson played at prop and won the White Rose Trophy as Man of the match, in Castleford's 10-5 victory over Bradford Northern in the 1981 Yorkshire Cup Final during the 1981–82 season at Headingley, Leeds on Saturday 3 October 1981, played at prop in the 18-22 defeat by Hull Kingston Rovers in the 1985 Yorkshire Cup Final during the 1985–86 season at Headingley, Leeds on Sunday 27 October 1985, and played at prop in the 31-24 victory over Hull F.C. in the 1986 Yorkshire Cup Final during the 1986–87 season at Headingley, Leeds on Saturday 11 October 1986.

=== Retirement ===
Since retiring, Johnson has been involved in the coaching of rugby league at the University of Sheffield, he is the father of the rugby league footballer who has played as a prop at the University of Sheffield.
