= Gary Lord (rugby league) =

English rugby league footballer

Personal information
- Full name: Gary Robert Lord
- Born: 6 July 1966 (age 60) Lower Agbrigg, Wakefield, England

Playing information
- Position: Fullback, Prop
Club
| Years | Team | Pld | T | G | FG | P |
|---|---|---|---|---|---|---|
| 1984–88 | Castleford | 52 | 9 | 0 | 0 | 36 |
| 1988–91 | Leeds | 63 | 4 | 0 | 0 | 16 |
| 1991–94 | Halifax | 88 | 10 | 0 | 0 | 40 |
| 1994–97 | Oldham Bears | 93 | 11 | 0 | 0 | 44 |
| 1998 | Wakefield Trinity | 33 | 0 | 0 | 0 | 0 |
| 1999 | Batley Bulldogs | 23 | 0 | 0 | 0 | 0 |
| 2000 | Hunslet Hawks | 14 | 1 | 0 | 0 | 4 |
| 2000–01 | Keighley Cougars | 11 | 2 | 0 | 0 | 8 |
| 2001 | Featherstone Rovers | 21 | 0 | 0 | 0 | 0 |
| | Total | 398 | 37 | 0 | 0 | 148 |
- Relatives: Paul Lord (brother)

Gary Lord (6 July 1966) is an English former professional rugby league footballer who played in the 1980s, 1990s and 2000s. He played at representative level for Great Britain (Under-21s), and at club level for Stanley Rangers ARLFC, Castleford, Leeds, Halifax, Oldham Bears in 1996's Super League I & 1997's Super League II, Wakefield Trinity, the Batley Bulldogs and Featherstone Rovers, as a fullback or prop.

== Playing career ==
=== International honours ===
Gary Lord represented Great Britain Under-21s against France during 1988.

=== Challenge Cup Final appearances ===
Gary Lord played fullback in Castleford's 15-14 victory over Hull Kingston Rovers in the 1985–86 Challenge Cup Final during the 1985–86 season at Wembley Stadium, London on Saturday 3 May 1986, in front of a crowd of 82,134.

=== County Cup Final appearances ===
Gary Lord appeared as a Substitute, replacing Gary Hyde, in Castleford's 18-22 defeat by Hull Kingston Rovers in the 1985–86 Yorkshire Cup Final during the 1985–86 season at Headingley, Leeds on Sunday 27 October 1985, and appeared as a Substitute, replacing Gary Hyde, in the 31-24 victory over Hull F.C. in the 1986–87 Yorkshire Cup Final during the 1986–87 season at Headingley, Leeds on Saturday 11 October 1986.

=== Club career ===
Gary Lord played for the Oldham Bears in 1996's Super League I, and 1997's Super League II, he made his début for Wakefield Trinity during the 1998 season, he made his début for Featherstone Rovers on Sunday 18 February 2001, and he retired from rugby league at the end of the 2001 season.

== Genealogical information ==
Gary Lord is the older brother of the rugby league footballer; Paul Lord.
