= Peter Sterling (rugby league) =

Australian rugby league footballer and broadcaster

Peter Sterling OAM
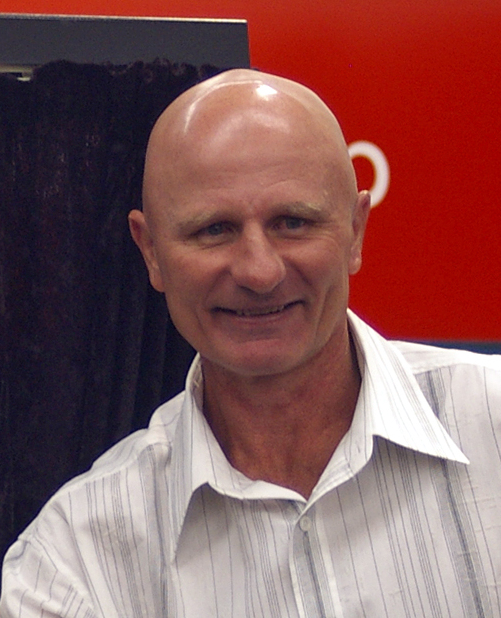

Personal information
- Full name: Peter Maxwell John Sterling
- Born: 16 June 1960 (age 66) Toowoomba, Queensland, Australia

Playing information
- Height: 178 cm (5 ft 10 in)
- Position: Halfback
Club
Years	Team	Pld	T	G	FG	P
1978–92	Parramatta Eels	228	48	1	15	190
1983–85	Hull F.C.	36	10	0	0	40
	Total	264	58	1	15	230
Representative
Years	Team	Pld	T	G	FG	P
1981–88	New South Wales	13	0	0	0	0
1982	City NSW	1	1	0	0	4
1982–88	Australia	18	4	0	1	16
1983–88	Country NSW	5	0	0	0	0

Peter Maxwell John Sterling OAM (born 16 June 1960), nicknamed Sterlo, is an Australian former rugby league commentator, television personality and player. He was one of the all-time great halfbacks and a major contributor to Parramatta Eels' dominance of the New South Wales Rugby League premiership in the 1980s. Sterling played eighteen Tests for the Australian national team between 1982 and 1988. He also played in thirteen State of Origins for New South Wales, winning man of the match on four occasions (one of them being the 1987 exhibition match played in the USA). Sterling played in four premiership-winning sides with Parramatta in 1981–1983 and 1986 and has been inducted into the Australian Rugby League Hall of Fame. His time spent playing for English club Hull F.C. also earned him membership in their hall of fame.

== Early life ==
Sterling was born in Toowoomba, Queensland, and raised in Raymond Terrace and Wagga Wagga, New South Wales. He attended Kooringal High School.

He commenced his playing career at the age of fourteen when he joined the Wagga Wagga Kangaroo Panthers in 1974. As a teenager Sterling spent several years living at RAAF Base Wagga, where his father was serving as a dental technician. Sterling then moved to Sydney, where he attended the Patrician Brothers' College Fairfield on a scholarship. In 1978 he helped the school to victory in the coveted Amco Shield.

== Playing career ==
Sterling compensated for a lack of size and pace with control and organisational skills that allowed Parramatta's all-star back line of Brett Kenny, Mick Cronin, Steve Ella and Eric Grothe a great deal of ball. His kicking, backed up by Kenny and Ray Price's superb chasing, often gave Parramatta an advantage in territory. His fast mind meant that he rarely made a wrong decision.. He was an effective defender who rarely missed tackles, and was often in position to secure a loose ball.

Sterling joined the Parramatta Eels in 1978, making his first appearance as a Fullback during the 1978 finals series, in the 17–11 minor semi-final replay loss to eventual premiers Manly. After a few games at Five-eighth in 1979, Sterling shifted to halfback and established himself as a player to watch in 1980. 1981 saw the Jack Gibson-coached Eels win their first Grand Final with a 20–11 win over the Tommy Raudonikis-led Newtown Jets, with Sterling's superb skill and control one of the decisive factors. He made his State of Origin début for NSW in the 1981 State of Origin game, setting up a try for Mick Cronin, though the Wally Lewis-captained Queenslanders turned a ten-point half time deficit into a seven-point, 22–15 win. Sterling himself admitted he was a surprise choice for NSW as he had only made his representative début a few weeks earlier when he played for City Seconds and rated himself as fifth in line for the NSW job. He was ultimately selected over his long-time rival for the NSW halfback spot, Canterbury-Bankstown's Steve Mortimer who had debuted for Australia in their two-Test series win over France only weeks before the Origin game.

In 1982, Parramatta could seemingly do no wrong, winning the minor premiership by four games over Manly. Though they were beaten 20–0 by Manly in the major semi-final, the Eels then thrashed Eastern Suburbs 33–0 in the preliminary final, before going on to turn the tables on the Sea Eagles with a 21–8 victory in the Grand Final at the Sydney Cricket Ground to win their second successive premiership.

Sterling was then chosen for the 1982 Kangaroo tour, and along with Queensland halfback Mark Murray was back-up to incumbent Test halfback Mortimer, despite having not played in the 1982 State of Origin series. After travelling with part of the team to Perth to face a Western Australian team and thus missing a place in Australia's first ever Test against Papua New Guinea, Sterling was presented a golden opportunity by coach Frank Stanton when he was chosen for the first game of the tour against English club side Hull Kingston Rovers. Sterling went about cementing his place in the Kangaroos’ "A" side and went on to make his Test début for Australia in the first Ashes Test against Great Britain at Boothferry Park in Hull. The 1982 Kangaroos went on to become the first team to go through Great Britain and France undefeated, earning them the nickname "The Invincibles", and was a personal success for Sterling who played in all five Tests against Great Britain and France, and cemented his place as the world's best halfback.

In 1983, Sterling played in Australia's win in the first Test against New Zealand at Carlaw Park in Auckland, but wasn't selected for Australia's shock 12–19 second Test loss at Lang Park when Murray was preferred. He was named man-of-the-match in Game 2 of the State of Origin series at the SCG, a game which saw the NSW side host an almost all-Parramatta backline, with Neil Hunt and Eric Grothe (wings), Mick Cronin and Steve Ella (centres) and Sterling and Brett Kenny (halves), while the Blues, who defeated Queensland 10–6, were also captained by Eels Lock forward Ray Price. Sterling then helped Parramatta to a third successive Grand Final win with an 18–6 win, again over runaway minor premiers Manly. Following his third successive premiership and his fifth overall, Jack Gibson, a man Peter Sterling held high praise for as both a person and a coach, shocked the establishment and resigned as Parramatta coach.

Following the 1982 Kangaroo Tour, Sterling had been highly sought after by English clubs and he went on to play for Hull F.C. in the 1983–84 English season. Sterling played scrum-half, and was man of the match in winning the White Rose Trophy with a 29–12 victory over Hull Kingston Rovers in the 1984 Yorkshire Cup Final during the 1984–85 season at Boothferry Park, Hull, on Saturday 27 October 1984. He was then chosen for Game 1 of the 1984 State of Origin series, but lost his place to Steve Mortimer for the rest of the series. Sterling was then overlooked for the home Ashes series against Great Britain in 1984, but would still go on to win the Rugby League Week Player of the Year award for the first time. In the 1984 Grand Final, Sterling and longtime halves partner Brett Kenny had few opportunities against Mortimer's Canterbury-Bankstown Bulldogs whose forwards dominated the Eels pack and gave the star pairing little room to move. The narrow 6–4 loss to the Bulldogs ended the John Monie-coached Parramatta's bid for a fourth successive premiership.

Sterling did not play for Parramatta, in the first half of 1985 as he returned to England to again link with Hull. Peter Sterling played scrum-half in Hull F.C.'s 0–12 defeat by Hull Kingston Rovers in the 1984–85 John Player Special Trophy Final during the 1984–85 season at Boothferry Park, Hull on Saturday 26 January 1985. Though he was relatively quiet upon his return to Parramatta, at the end of the season Sterling's skill allowed Parramatta to defeat Balmain (twice, the second a 32–4 win in the Minor-Semi) and Penrith (Minor Preliminary-Semi), to move from doubtful finalists to the Preliminary Final – where a ruthless Canterbury side on their way to a second successive premiership, easily accounted for the Eels 26–0. As a result of his decision to play in England and miss the first part of the NSWRL premiership, Sterling lost his place in the NSW side in the 1985 State of Origin series to Steve Mortimer, who led the Blues to their first ever series win over Queensland. He also miss his chance to regain his test place for the mid-season tour of New Zealand in 1985, with the halfback role shared between Mark Murray and Manly's versatile utility Des Hasler. By missing both Origin and Test selection in 1985, Sterling missed the opportunity to link with the coach who gave him his first grade début at Parramatta Terry Fearnley, who coached both representative teams.

While playing for Hull in the early part of 1985, Sterling led the team, which also included a number of internationals such as; fullback Gary Kemble, wingers Dane O'Hara and James Leuluai and his halves partner Fred Ah Kuoi (all NZ), centre Garry Schofield (GB), Parramatta second-rower John Muggleton (Aus), and goal kicking forward (and Hull captain) Lee Crooks (GB), into the 1985 Challenge Cup Final. Sterling played scrum-half in Hull F.C.'s 24–28 defeat by Wigan in the final at Wembley Stadium, London on Saturday 4 May 1985, in front of a crowd of 99,801, in what is regarded as the most marvellous cup final in living memory, which Hull narrowly lost after fighting back from 12–28 down at half-time, with Sterling's Parramatta halves partner Brett Kenny (playing for Wigan) was voted man of the match winning the Lance Todd Trophy. Sterling, who produced a great game in both attack and defence, had gone into the game as one of the shortest priced favourites to win the Lance Todd Trophy, with bookmakers in Hull allegedly (according to BBC commentator Ray French during the telecast of the Cup Final) refusing to field any more bets on Sterling in the week leading up to the game.

1986 saw Sterling almost carry a clean sweep of the major awards – except the Rothmans Medal – and win the inaugural Clive Churchill Medal in Parramatta's fourth Grand Final victory, reversing the 1984 result with a 4–2 win over Canterbury-Bankstown to send the retiring Mick Cronin and team captain Ray Price out as premiership winners. 1986 also saw the Parramatta with their own home ground for the first time since over-excited fans had burned down the old Cumberland Oval grandstand during the 1981 Grand Final celebrations. Between 1982 and 1985 the club was forced to play home games at Canterbury-Bankstown's home ground, the Belmore Sports Ground, but in 1986 the new Parramatta Stadium was opened by Queen Elizabeth II and Sterling set about making the venue his own personal playground.

During the year he was also part of the NSW Team which swept Qld 3–0 in the State of Origin series (the first time in series history a team had won all three games), winning man of the match in Game 2 at the SCG. After regaining his test place in the successful two test series against New Zealand, Sterling was an automatic selection for his second Kangaroo tour at the end of the season, this time going away as the undisputed number one halfback with 1985 test halfback Des Hasler.

Sterling won The Rothman's medal in 1987 and 1990 but only featured in one match of The 1991 season after suffering a shoulder injury. He returned to the field in 1992, but his shoulder was injured again after being hit in a hard tackle by Western Suburbs player David Gillespie. This would prove to be Sterling's final game as he retired due to being unable to recover from the recurring shoulder problem.

== Post-playing career ==
Sterling lives in Nelson Bay with his wife, Selina, and daughter Hannah. His hobbies include golf and the breeding of thoroughbreds. Sterling supports Liverpool F.C. in the Premier League.

=== Television / Radio career ===
Sterling's sharp intelligence marked him as an astute analyst of the game with the former Eel commentating for the Nine Network after initially starting in the media with Western Sydney radio station 2WS and Channel 10 where he was a sideline commentator for their coverage of the 1987 NSWRL finals.

His autobiography, 'Sterlo! The Story of a Champion' was released in 1989.

Sterling later went on to host The Sunday Footy Show, anchoring the program from the show's inception in 1993 until the end of the 2015 season with him being replaced by Yvonne Sampson from the 2016 season.

Sterling was also co-host of Nine's The NRL Footy Show from 1994–2006 alongside Paul Vautin.

He made a guest appearance in 2007 on the first episode for the year to say farewell to the show before coming back for a short stint in 2010 as alternating host.

He currently hosts Nine's 'Thursday Night Football' and is a member of their commentary team, he also rotates the hosting of 'Sunday Afternoon Football' with Yvonne Sampson.

Sterling joined Triple M in March 2010 as an expert commentator on Monday Night Football and is an occasional panellist on Dead Set Legends and The Rush Hour.

In March 2013, Sterling began hosting a weekly NRL show on Fox Sports called 'Sterlo; airing on Thursday nights. His show was axed in 2014 due to poor ratings competing with The Footy Show.

Sterling now hosts On the Couch with Sterlo which airs on Tuesday every week. He hosted the Fox Sports program between the 2015 and 2017 seasons before signing an exclusive deal with channel Nine from 2018 onwards.

On 9 August 2021, it was announced that Sterling would be leaving the Nine Network after 27 years.

=== Rugby League awards ===
Since retiring from playing the game, Sterling has won several awards. In 1995, Sterling was picked at halfback in a poll to judge the best Australian team since the introduction of the limited-tackle rule in 1967. He won eight of fourteen votes, with the remainder going to Billy Smith, Ricky Stuart and Allan Langer.

In 2000 Sterling was awarded the Australian Sports Medal for his contribution to Australia's international standing in rugby league. He was also inducted into the Sport Australia Hall of Fame in that year. In 2006, he was one of six past players to be inducted into the Australian Rugby League Hall of Fame at the Dally M. Awards 2006 award ceremony.

In February 2008, Sterling was named in the list of Australia's 100 Greatest Players (1908–2007) which was commissioned by the NRL and ARL to celebrate the code's centenary year in Australia.

On 18 May 2026 Sterling, along with former NSW and Australian Captain Boyd Cordner, were inducted into the NSW Rugby League Hall of Fame at the annual True Blue dinner.

Awards

- NSWRL Premiership (x4): 1981-83, 1986
- Clive Churchill Medal: 1986
- Dally M Player of the Year (x2): 1986, 1987
- Dally M Halfback of the Year (x4): 1983, 1984, 1986, 1987
- Golden Boot Award: 1987
- State of Origin Series Winner: 1986
- RLW Player of the Year (x3): 1984, 1986, 1987
- Rothmans Medal (x2): 1987, 1990
- Ken Stephen Medal: 1992
- NSWRL Hall of Fame 2026

== Sources ==
- Whiticker, Alan and Hudson, Glen; The Encyclopedia of Rugby League Players (3rd edition 1998); published Gary Allen Pty. Ltd.; Smithfield
- Middleton, David (editor); Rugby League 1987–88 (1988); Lester Townsend Publishing Pty Ltd; Paddington, NSW
- Middleton, David (editor); Rugby League 1996 (1996); HarperCollins Publishers; Pymble, Sydney

Media offices
Preceded by Program started	Sunday Footy Show; Host; 1993–2015	Succeeded by Yvonne Sampson
