= Gary Divorty =

GB international rugby league footballer (born 1966)

Personal information
- Born: 28 January 1966 (age 59)

Playing information
- Position: Second-row, Loose forward
Club
Years	Team	Pld	T	G	FG	P
1983–89	Hull FC	176	42	17	10	212
1990	Gold Coast-Tweed Giants	5	0	0	0	0
1989–92	Leeds	83	15	1	6	68
1992–95	Halifax	104	32	0	3	131
1995–97	Hull FC	56	18	0	3	75
1997	Wakefield Trinity	11	1	1	1	7
	Total	435	108	19	23	493
Representative
Years	Team	Pld	T	G	FG	P
1984–87	Great Britain U21	6	3	0	0	12
1985	Great Britain	2	1	1	0	6
- Relatives: Ross Divorty (son)

Gary Divorty (born 28 January 1966) is an English former professional rugby league footballer who played in the 1980s and 1990s. He played at representative level for Great Britain, and at club level for Hull FC, Gold Coast-Tweed Giants, Leeds, Halifax, Wakefield Trinity, and York, as a second-row, or loose forward.

== Background ==
Gary Divorty was born on 28 January 1966. His father, Robin, was an amateur rugby league coach. He started his junior rugby league career with Heworth before turning professional in 1983, signing for Hull.

== Playing career ==
=== Hull FC ===
Divorty played loose forward, in Hull FC's 29-12 victory over Hull Kingston Rovers in the 1984 Yorkshire Cup Final during the 1984–85 season at Boothferry Park, Kingston upon Hull, on Saturday 27 October 1984, and played loose forward in Hull FC's 0-12 defeat by Hull Kingston Rovers in the 1984–85 John Player Special Trophy Final at Boothferry Park, Kingston upon Hull on Saturday 26 January 1985. He also appeared as a substitute, and scored a try in Hull FC's 24-28 defeat by Wigan in the 1985 Challenge Cup Final at Wembley Stadium, London on Saturday 4 May 1985, in front of a crowd of 99,801, in what is regarded as the most marvellous cup final in living memory, which Hull narrowly lost after fighting back from 12-28 down at half-time.

Divorty was a substitute in Hull FC's 24-31 defeat by Castleford in the 1986 Yorkshire Cup Final during the 1986–87 season at Headingley, Leeds, on Saturday 11 October 1986.

=== Leeds ===
Divorty signed for Leeds in 1989. The transfer fee was set at £120,000 by a tribunal after Hull and Leeds failed to reach an agreement.

=== Halifax ===
In August 1992, Divorty and Leeds teammate John Bentley were signed by Halifax for a combined fee of £100,000. Divorty played for three seasons at Halifax before returning to his original club, Hull, in 1995.

=== International honours ===
Gary Divorty won caps for Great Britain while at Hull in 1985 against France (2 matches).

== Personal life ==
Gary Divorty is the father of the rugby league footballer, Ross Divorty.
