= Gary Hyde =

English rugby league footballer

Personal information
- Born: 28 February 1960 (age 65); Castleford, England

Playing information
- Position: Centre
Club
| Years | Team | Pld | T | G | FG | P |
|---|---|---|---|---|---|---|
| 1978–88 | Castleford | 271 | 130 | 216 | 0 | 875 |
| 1988–91 | Oldham | 42 | 10 | 32 | 0 | 104 |
| | Total | 313 | 140 | 248 | 0 | 979 |
Representative
| Years | Team | Pld | T | G | FG | P |
| 1980–82 | Great Britain U-24 | 2 | 0 | 0 | 0 | 0 |
| 1985 | Yorkshire | 1 | 1 | 0 | 0 | 4 |

Gary Hyde (born 28 February 1960) is an English former professional rugby league footballer who played in the 1970s, 1980s and 1990s. He played at representative level for Great Britain (Under-24s), and at club level for Castleford and Oldham, as a centre.

== Background ==
Gary Hyde was born in Castleford, West Riding of Yorkshire, England.

== Playing career ==
=== Castleford ===
Hyde made his début for Castleford in the 22–10 victory over Huddersfield on Sunday 19 November 1978.

Gary Hyde played at centre in Castleford's 15–14 victory over Hull Kingston Rovers in the 1986 Challenge Cup Final during the 1985–86 season at Wembley Stadium, London on Saturday 3 May 1986.

Gary Hyde played at centre in Castleford's 10–5 victory over Bradford Northern in the 1981 Yorkshire Cup Final during the 1981–82 season at Headingley, Leeds, on Saturday 3 October 1981, played at centre (replaced by substitute Ian Orum) in the 2–13 defeat by Hull F.C. in the 1983 Yorkshire Cup Final during the 1983–84 season at Elland Road, Leeds, on Saturday 15 October 1983, played at centre in the 18–22 defeat by Hull Kingston Rovers in the 1985 Yorkshire Cup Final during the 1985–86 season at Headingley, Leeds, on Sunday 27 October 1985, played on the wing (replaced by substitute Gary Lord) in the 31–24 victory over Hull F.C. in the 1986 Yorkshire Cup Final during the 1986–87 season at Headingley, Leeds, on Saturday 11 October 1986, played on the wing in the 12–12 draw with Bradford Northern in the 1987 Yorkshire Cup Final during the 1987–88 season at Headingley, Leeds, on Saturday 17 October 1987, and played on the wing in the 2–11 defeat by Bradford Northern in the 1987 Yorkshire Cup Final replay during the 1987–88 season at Elland Road, Leeds, on Saturday 31 October 1987.

=== Oldham ===
Hyde was signed by Oldham in December 1988 for a fee of £15,000.

Hyde played at centre, and scored a goal in Oldham's 16–24 defeat by Warrington in the 1989 Lancashire Cup Final during the 1989–90 season at Knowsley Road, St. Helens on Saturday 14 October 1989.
