= 1984–85 Rugby League Premiership =

1984–85 Premiership
- Structure: National knockout championship
- Winners: St Helens
- Runners-up: Hull Kingston Rovers

The 1984–85 Rugby League Premiership was the 11th end of season Rugby League Premiership competition.

The winners were St Helens.

== First round ==
Date	Team one	Team two	Score
27 Apr	St Helens	Widnes	26-2
28 Apr	Hull Kingston Rovers	Bradford Northern	42-18
28 Apr	Leeds	Oldham	36-18
28 Apr	Wigan	Hull F.C.	46-12

== Semi-finals ==
Date	Team one	Team two	Score
1 May	Hull Kingston Rovers	Leeds	15-14
7 May	St Helens	Wigan	37-14

== Final ==
11 May 1985

St Helens	36-16	Hull Kingston Rovers
T-Veivers, Ledger (2), Meninga (2), Ainsworth, Pinner; G-Day (4)		T-Fairbairn, Robinson, Laws; G-Fairbairn (2)

Elland Road
Attendance: 15,518
Referee: Stan Wall
Player of the Match: Harry Pinner

1	Phil Veivers
2	Barry Ledger
3	Stephen/Steven "Steve" Peters
4	Mal Meninga
5	Sean Day
6	Chris Arkwright
7	Neil Holding
8	Antony/Anthony "Tony" Burke
9	Gary Ainsworth
10	Peter Gorley
11	Andy Platt
12	Roy Haggerty
13	Harry Pinner
Substitutions:
14	Shaun Allen for Mal Meninga
15	Paul Forber for Antony/Anthony "Tony" Burke
Coach:
Billy Benyon

1	George Fairbairn
2	Garry Clark
3	Ian Robinson
4	Gary Prohm
5	David Laws
6	Mike Smith
7	Gordon Smith
8	Mark Broadhurst
9	David Watkinson
10	Asuquo Ema
11	Andy Kelly
12	Phil Hogan
13	Dave Hall
Substitutions:
14	Paul Harkin for Gordon Smith
15	John Lydiat for Asuquo Ema
Coach:
Roger Millward
