= Brett Atkins =

Australian rugby league footballer

Personal information
- Born: 5 August 1964 (age 60); Australia

Playing information
- Position: Wing, Second-row
Club
Years	Team	Pld	T	G	FG	P
1983–84	Manly-Warringah	12	0	0	0	0
1983–87	Castleford	45	21	0	0	84
1985–86	Canberra Raiders	23	3	0	0	12
1988–89	Parramatta Eels	24	3	0	0	12
1991–91	Canberra Raiders	2	0	0	0	0
	Total	106	27	0	0	108

Brett Atkins (born 5 August 1964) is an Australian former professional rugby league footballer who played in the 1980s and 1990s. He played at club level for Manly Warringah Sea Eagles, Castleford, Canberra Raiders (twice), and Parramatta Eels, as a wing, or second-row.

== Playing career ==
=== County Cup Final appearances ===
Brett Atkins played at second-row (replaced by substitute Alan Shillito) in Castleford's 18-22 defeat by Hull Kingston Rovers in the 1985 Yorkshire Cup Final during the 1985–86 season at Headingley, Leeds, on Sunday 27 October 1985, and played at second-row, (replaced by substitute Alan Shillito) and scored a try in the 31-24 victory over Hull F.C. in the 1986 Yorkshire Cup Final during the 1986–87 season at Headingley, Leeds, on Saturday 11 October 1986.
