= Tony Spears =

English rugby league footballer

Personal information
- Born: 14 October 1965 (age 60) Wakefield district, England

Playing information
- Position: Wing
Club
Years	Team	Pld	T	G	FG	P
1985–87	Castleford	30	6	0	0	24

Tony Spears (born 14 October 1965) is an English former professional rugby league footballer who played in the 1980s. He played at club level for Castleford, as a wing.

== Background ==
Tony Spears' birth was registered in Wakefield district, West Riding of Yorkshire, England.

== Playing career ==
Spears played on the wing in Castleford's 18-22 defeat by Hull Kingston Rovers in the 1985 Yorkshire Cup Final during the 1985–86 season at Headingley, Leeds, on Sunday 27 October 1985.
