= Andy Dannatt =

GB international rugby league footballer

Personal information
- Full name: Andrew Dannatt
- Born: 20 November 1965 (age 60) Kingston-upon-Hull, England

Playing information
- Position: Prop, Second-row
Club
Years	Team	Pld	T	G	FG	P
1983–93	Hull FC	231	26	0	0	104
1993–95	St Helens	41	2	0	0	8
1995–99	Hull Kingston Rovers	95	2	0	0	8
	Total	367	30	0	0	120
Representative
Years	Team	Pld	T	G	FG	P
1985–91	Great Britain	3	0	0	0	0

Andrew Dannatt (born 20 November 1965) is a former professional rugby league footballer who played in the 1980s and 1990s. He played at representative level for Great Britain, and at club level for Hull FC, St Helens and Hull Kingston Rovers, as a prop or second-row.

Dannatt represented Great Britain at under-21 level before earning his full international caps. Records show he made six appearances for the Great Britain Under-21s, including games against France in 1985 and 1986. He was also part of a particularly strong generation of Hull FC youngsters during the 1980s, when Hull had one of the leading youth setups in the country.

== Playing career ==
=== Club career ===
Dannatt played as a substitute (replacing prop Phil Edmonds) in Hull's 0–12 defeat by Hull Kingston Rovers in the 1984–85 John Player Special Trophy Final during the 1984–85 season at Boothferry Park, Kingston upon Hull on 26 January 1985.

Dannatt played prop in Hull's 24–31 defeat by Castleford in the 1986 Yorkshire Cup Final during the 1986–87 season at Headingley, Leeds on 11 October 1986.

Dannatt played prop in Hull's 14–4 victory over Widnes in the Premiership Final during the 1990–91 season at Old Trafford, Manchester on 12 May 1991.

Dannatt's Testimonial match at Hull F.C. took place in 1993.

=== International honours ===
Dannatt won caps for Great Britain while at Hull in 1985 against France (2 matches), and in 1991 against France.

== Outside of rugby league ==
Upon retirement from rugby league, Andy Dannatt became a licensee, he then left Hull to become a scaffolder in London, later returning to Hull to work as a plumbing and heating engineer.
