= Paul Lord (rugby league) =

English rugby league footballer

Personal information
- Full name: Paul James Lord
- Born: 22 December 1967 (age 58) Lower Agbrigg, Wakefield, England

Playing information
- Position: Wing
Club
Years	Team	Pld	T	G	FG	P
1986–91	Oldham	86+7	53	0	0	212
1991	Doncaster	3	3	0	0	12
1991–93	Wakefield Trinity	10+4	0	0	0	0
1993–94	Swinton
	Total	110	56	0	0	224
- Relatives: Gary Lord (brother)

Paul Lord (22 December 1967) is an English former professional rugby league footballer who played in the 1980s and 1990s. He played at club level for Stanley Rangers ARLFC, Oldham, Doncaster, Wakefield Trinity, and Swinton, as a wing.

== Playing career ==
Lord played on the wing and scored a try in Oldham's 16-24 defeat by Warrington in the 1989–90 Lancashire Cup Final during the 1989–90 season at Knowsley Road, St Helens on Saturday 14 October 1989.

== Personal life ==
Paul Lord is the younger brother of the rugby league footballer; Gary Lord.
