= David Creasser =

GB & England international rugby league footballer

Dave Creasser
Personal information
- Born: 18 June 1965 (age 61) Leeds, West Riding of Yorkshire, England

Playing information
- Position: Centre
Club
Years	Team	Pld	T	G	FG	P
1983–92	Leeds	225	90	356	1	1073
1993–95	Keighley	22	4	6	0	28
1995	Hunslet	1	0	0	0	0
	Total	248	94	362	1	1101
Representative
Years	Team	Pld	T	G	FG	P
1984–86	Great Britain U21	5	0	8	0	16
1985–87	Yorkshire	2	1	0	0	4
1985–88	Great Britain	4	0	10	0	20

David Creasser (born 18 June 1965) is an English former professional rugby league footballer who played in the 1980s and 1990s. He played at representative level for British Amateur Rugby League Association (BARLA) Young Lions (alongside Garry Schofield), and Great Britain, and at club level for Leeds, Keighley Cougars and Hunslet, as a goal-kicking centre.

== Playing career ==
=== Club career ===
Creasser made his début for Leeds in the 30–14 victory over Batley in the 1983–84 Yorkshire Cup first-round match during the 1983–84 season at Mount Pleasant, Batley on 4 September 1983.

Creasser played centre, and scored five goals in Leeds' 18–10 victory over Widnes in the 1983–84 John Player Special Trophy Final during the 1983–84 season at Central Park, Wigan on 14 January 1984, and played stand-off, and scored a try, and three goals in the 14–15 defeat by St. Helens in the 1987–88 John Player Special Trophy Final during the 1987–88 season at Central Park, Wigan on 9 January 1988.

Creasser was forced to retire after the 1991–92 season at the age of 27 due to persistent shoulder injuries. His Testimonial match took place in October 1993 when Leeds played New Zealand in the 1993 Kiwis tour.

=== International honours ===
David Creasser won caps for Great Britain while at Leeds in 1985 against France (2 matches), in 1987 against France, and in 1988 against France.
