= 1984–85 Yorkshire Cup =

- Structure: Regional knockout championship
- Teams: 16
- Winners: Hull F.C.
- Runners-up: Hull Kingston Rovers

The 1984–85 Yorkshire Cup was the seventy-seventh occasion on which the Yorkshire Cup competition had been held. This season there were no junior/amateur clubs taking part, no new entrants and no "leavers" and so the total of entries remained the same at sixteen. In this year's final, Hull F.C. beat close neighbours and fierce rivals Hull Kingston Rovers by the score of 29–12. The match was played at Boothferry Park, Kingston upon Hull. The city was formally in the East Riding of Yorkshire, followed by Humberside and is now (back) in the ceremonial county of the East Riding of Yorkshire. It was moved to this stadium from the provisionally reserved venue due to the interest showed by fans and after requests by both finalists, and the organisers were rewarded with a crowd of 25,237 and gate receipts more than doubled from last year's £33,572 to £68,639. This is only the third meeting of these two clubs in the Yorkshire Cup final, on the two previous occasions Hull Kingston Rovers defeated Hull F.C., in 1920–21 by 2–0 and 1967 by 8–7; this time it was revenge and by a wider margin. This is the third successive Yorkshire Cup final victory for Hull F.C. And the first of two successive Final appearances by Hull Kingston Rovers.

== Background ==
The Rugby League Yorkshire Cup competition was a knock-out competition between (mainly professional) rugby league clubs from the county of Yorkshire. The actual area was at times increased to encompass other teams from outside the county such as Newcastle, Mansfield, Coventry, and even London (in the form of Acton & Willesden).

The Rugby League season always (until the onset of "Summer Rugby" in 1996) ran from around August-time through to around May-time and this competition always took place early in the season, in the Autumn, with the final taking place in (or just before) December (The only exception to this was when disruption of the fixture list was caused during, and immediately after, the two World Wars).

== Competition and results ==
=== Round 1 ===
Involved 8 matches and 16 clubs

Game No	Fixture Date	Home team	Score	Away team	Venue	Att	Rec	Notes	Ref
1	Sat 15 Sep 1984	Wakefield Trinity	0–30	Bradford Northern	Belle Vue	2403			
2	Sun 16 Sep 1984	Batley	17–18	Featherstone Rovers	Mount Pleasant	1611			
3	Sun 16 Sep 1984	Castleford	14–16	Leeds	Wheldon Road	4706			
4	Sun 16 Sep 1984	Dewsbury	4–12	Bramley	Crown Flatt	861			
5	Sun 16 Sep 1984	Doncaster	4–48	Hull Kingston Rovers	Bentley Road Stadium/Tattersfield	1889			
6	Sun 16 Sep 1984	Huddersfield Barracudas	9–6	Keighley	Arena 84	1016		(Note: This is the first Yorkshire Cup match played by the newly renamed Huddersfield Barracudas and also since Fartown was renamed as Arena 84)	
7	Sun 16 Sep 1984	Hull F.C.	30–10	Halifax	Boulevard	7797			
8	Sun 16 Sep 1984	York	20–16	Hunslet	Clarence Street	2377			

=== Round 2 - Quarter-finals ===
Involved 4 matches and 8 clubs

Game No	Fixture Date	Home team	Score	Away team	Venue	Att	Rec	Notes	Ref
1	Wed 26 Sep 1984	Bradford Northern	4–10	Leeds	Odsal	7650			
2	Wed 26 Sep 1984	Featherstone Rovers	18–2	Bramley	Post Office Road	1503			
3	Wed 26 Sep 1984	Hull Kingston Rovers	18–2	Huddersfield Barracudas	Craven Park (1)	5186			
4	Wed 26 Sep 1984	York	8–38	Hull F.C.	Clarence Street	4494			

=== Round 3 – Semi-finals ===
Involved 2 matches and 4 clubs

Game No	Fixture Date	Home team	Score	Away team	Venue	Att	Rec	Notes	Ref
1	Tue 16 Oct 1984	Hull F.C.	24–1	Leeds	Boulevard	10477		(Note: This was the first Yorkshire Cup tie in which one of the teams scored a single point.) (Note: The attendance is given as 10,477 by RUGBYLEAGUEproject but the official Hull F.C. archives give the attendance as 10,775)	
2	Wed 17 Oct 1984	Featherstone Rovers	2–22	Hull Kingston Rovers	Post Office Road	4354			

=== Final ===
Game No	Fixture Date	Home team	Score	Away team	Venue	Att	Rec	Notes	Ref
	Saturday 27 October 1984	Hull F.C.	29–12	Hull Kingston Rovers	Boothferry Park	25,237	£68,639	(Note: Boothferry Park was the home ground of Hull City from 31 August 1946 until December 2002. The final capacity was 15,160 although the record attendance was 55,019 set on 26 February 1949 in an FA Cup quarter-final when Hull City played host to Manchester United)	

==== Teams and scorers ====
Hull	№	Hull Kingston Rovers
	teams	
Gary Kemble	1	George Fairbairn
A'au James Leuluai	2	Garry Clark
Garry Schofield	3	Ian Robinson
Steve Evans	4	Gary Prohm
Dane O'Hara	5	David Laws
Fred Ah Kuoi	6	Mike Smith
Peter Sterling	7	Paul Harkin
Phil Edmonds	8	Mark Broadhurst
Shaun Patrick	9	David Watkinson
Lee Crooks	10	Asuquo "Zook" Ema
Steve 'Knocker' Norton	11	Chris Burton
Wayne Proctor	12	Andy Kelly
Gary Divorty	13	Dave Hall
Paul Rose	14	Chris Rudd (for Paul Harkin)
David Topliss	15	Steve Hartley (for Dave Hall)
Arthur Bunting	Coach	Roger Millward
29	score	12
8	HT	12
	Scorers	
	Tries	
Gary Kemble (2)	T	George Fairbairn (1)
Steve Evans (1)	T	Ian Robinson (1)
Lee Crooks (1)	T	David Hall (1)
Steve 'Knocker' Norton (1)	T	
	Goals	
Garry Schofield (4)	G	
	Drop Goals	
Garry Schofield (1)	DG	
Referee		G. Fred Lindop (Wakefield)
White Rose Trophy for Man of the match		Peter Sterling - Hull - scrum-half
sponsored by		
Competition Sponsor		Phillips Video

Scoring - Try = four points - Goal = two points - Drop goal = one point

=== The road to success ===
First round
York	20
Hunslet	16
Hull F.C.	30
Halifax	10
Wakefield Trinity	0
Bradford Northern	30
Castleford	14
Leeds	16
Batley	17
Featherstone Rovers	18
Dewsbury	4
Bramley	12
Doncaster	4
Hull Kingston Rovers	48
Huddersfield Barracudas	9
Keighley	6

Second round
York	8
Hull F.C.	38
Bradford Northern	4
Leeds	10
Featherstone Rovers	18
Bramley	2
Hull Kingston Rovers	18
Huddersfield Barracudas	2

Semi-finals
Hull F.C.	24
Leeds	1
Featherstone Rovers	2
Hull Kingston Rovers	22

Final
Hull F.C.	29
Hull Kingston Rovers	12

== See also ==
- 1984–85 Rugby Football League season
- Rugby league county cups
