= George Fairbairn (rugby) =

GB & England international rugby league & union player (born 1954)

Personal information
- Full name: George Alexander Fairbairn
- Born: 25 July 1954 (age 72) Peebles, Scottish Borders, Scotland

Playing information

Rugby union
- Position: Full back
Club
Years	Team	Pld	T	G	FG	P
197?–74	Kelso
Representative
Years	Team	Pld	T	G	FG	P
197?–7?	Borders

Rugby league
- Position: Fullback, Wing
Club
Years	Team	Pld	T	G	FG	P
1974–81	Wigan	204+3	30	583	11	1267
1981–89	Hull KR	269	49	549	19	1290
	Total	476	79	1132	30	2557
Representative
Years	Team	Pld	T	G	FG	P
1975–81	England	15	3	43	1	96
1977–82	Great Britain	17	1	44	0	91
1977–82	Lancashire	2	0	7	0	14

Coaching information
Club
Years	Team	Gms	W	D	L	W%
1980–81	Wigan	34	23	3	8	68
1991–94	Hull Kingston Rovers	97	34	1	62	35
1994–95	Huddersfield	48	27	3	18	56
	Total	179	84	7	88	47
Representative
Years	Team	Gms	W	D	L	W%
1995–97	Scotland

George Alexander Fairbairn (born 25 July 1954) is a Scottish former rugby union and professional rugby league footballer who played in the 1970s and 1980s and coached rugby league in the 1980s and 1990s. He played representative level rugby union for Borders and at club level for Kelso RFC. Later he played at representative level rugby league for Great Britain and England and at club level for Wigan and Hull KR. He won the Man of Steel Award in 1980 and was known for goal-kicking. Fairbairn coached at representative level rugby league for Scotland and at club level for Wigan, Hull Kingston Rovers and Huddersfield.

Fairbairn retired as England's top point scorer in test football. In September 2012, he was named in Hull KR's greatest-ever team.

== Background ==
Born in Peebles, Scotland, and raised in Coldstream, Scotland.

== Playing career ==
=== Wigan ===
In 1974, he changed rugby football codes from rugby union to rugby league when he transferred from Kelso to Wigan. Although born in Scotland, Fairbairn qualified to play international rugby league for England due to his father being English. He became only the second Scottish-born person after Andrew Hogg to play for the England national team. Fairbairn won caps for England while at Wigan in the 1975 Rugby League World Cup against Wales (2 matches), New Zealand (2 matches), Australia (2 matches), and France, and later in 1975 against Papua New Guinea.

He won caps for Great Britain while at Wigan in 1977 Rugby League World Cup against France, New Zealand, and 2 matches against Australia including the 13–12 World Cup final loss at the Sydney Cricket Ground. During the first half of the Final, a dropped ball by Fairbairn after a Lions scrum win saw Australian centre Russel Gartner race away for a 60-metre try. He also played for England in 1977 against Wales, and France.

Fairbairn played in all three tests for Great Britain in 1978 against the touring Australians during the Ashes series. He also played for England in 1978 against France. He played for Great Britain in 1979 against Australia and New Zealand (3 matches) on the Lions lackluster tour of both countries. Originally left out of the touring squad, Fairbairn joined the team in Australia following injuries to players.

George Fairbairn played fullback and scored a try and two conversions in Wigan's 10–26 defeat by Warrington in the 1980–81 Lancashire Cup Final during the 1980–81 season at Knowsley Road, St. Helens, on Saturday 4 October 1980.

At the end of the 1979–80 Northern Rugby Football League season, despite Wigan's relegation to the second division, Fairbairn received the Man of Steel Award for player of the season. He then played for England in 1980 against Wales, and France, and for Great Britain in 1980 against the touring New Zealand Kiwis (2 matches).

Fairbairn was appointed as a player-coach at Wigan for the 1980–81 season, helping the club win promotion back to the first division. After the club's coaching duties were given to Maurice Bamford at the end of the season, Fairbairn requested a transfer, and was sold to Hull Kingston Rovers for a record fee of £72,500.

=== Hull Kingston Rovers ===
While at Hull Kingston Rovers Fairbairn played for England in 1981 against France and Wales. He also played for Great Britain in 1981 against France and in 1982 against the touring Australians (2 matches). Fairbairn played fullback in Great Britain's 7–8 defeat by France in the friendly at Stadio Pier Luigi Penzo, Venice on Saturday 31 July 1982.

With 52 goals, Fairbairn is second in the list of England's all-time goal scorers and with 118 points he is also second (behind Kevin Sinfield) in the list of England's all-time point scorers.

In 1982, Fairbairn played for Hull KR is their 30–10 defeat by Australia as part of their 1982 Kangaroo tour. Hull KR had actually led Australia 8–5 at halftime of their opening tour match and were the only team to score more than one try against them, but as would become the norm on that tour The Kangaroos exploded in the second half to blow the Hull Kingston Rovers away. That Kangaroo touring team became the first team to go undefeated through a tour of Great Britain and France, earning themselves the nickname The Invincibles.

In October 1983, Fairbairn played fullback for Hull KR in their 8–6 victory over the touring Queensland state team from Australia at Craven Park. Fairbairns's two goals proved to be the difference between the two teams who had each scored a single try with Queensland and future Australian captain Wally Lewis only managing one goal from three attempts.

George Fairbairn played fullback in Hull KR's 14–15 defeat by Castleford in the 1985–86 Challenge Cup Final at Wembley Stadium, London, on Saturday 3 May 1986, in front of a crowd of 82,134.

He then played in Hull KR's 12–29 defeat by Hull F.C. in the 1984–85 Yorkshire Cup Final during the 1984–85 season at Boothferry Park in Hull, on Saturday 27 October 1984, and played fullback, (replaced by John Lydiat) in the 22–18 victory over Castleford in the 1985–86 Yorkshire Cup Final during the 1985–86 season at Headingley in Leeds on Sunday 27 October 1985.

Fairbairn played and scored two conversions in Hull KR's 4–12 defeat by Hull F.C. in the 1981–82 John Player Trophy Final during the 1981–82 season at Headingley on Saturday 23 January 1982, and played in the 12–0 victory over Hull F.C. in the 1984–85 John Player Special Trophy Final during the 1984–85 season at Boothferry Park on Saturday 26 January 1985.

In 1986, Fairbairn played for Hull KR is their 46–10 defeat by Australia as part of their 1986 Kangaroo tour. Like the 1982 Kangaroos, the Wally Lewis captained Kangaroos went undefeated on the 1986 tour and were given the nickname The Unbeatables.

== Coaching career ==
George Fairbairn's Testimonial match at Hull Kingston Rovers took place in 1992. Fairbairn also became coach of the Scotland national rugby league team from 1995 to 1997.

== Honours ==
Club

- Rugby League Championship Winner - 1984, 1985 (Runner Up 1975, 1983)
- Challenge Cup Runner Up - 1986
- John Player Trophy Winner - 1985 (Runner Up 1982)
- Premiership Trophy Winner - 1984 (Runner Up 1985)
- Yorkshire Cup Winner - 1985 (Runner Up 1984)
- Second Division Championship Winner - 1981, 1990
- Lancashire Cup Runner Up - 1980

International

- Rugby League World Cup Runner Up - 1977

Individual

- Man Of Steel - 1980
- Open Rugby World XIII: 1980, January 1981

Achievements
Preceded by Trevor Skerrett	Rugby league transfer record Wigan to Hull Kingston Rovers; 1981–1985	Succeeded by Ellery Hanley
