= 1985–86 Yorkshire Cup =

- Structure: Regional knockout championship
- Teams: 17
- Winners: Hull Kingston Rovers
- Runners-up: Castleford

The 1985–86 Yorkshire Cup was the seventy-eighth occasion on which the Yorkshire Cup competition had been held. This season there were no junior/amateur clubs taking part, no "leavers", but one new entrant in the form of newcomers to the league, Sheffield Eagles and so the total of entries increases by one up to seventeen. This in turn resulted in the necessity to introduce a preliminary round to reduce the number of clubs entering the first round to sixteen.

Last year's runner-up, Hull Kingston Rovers returned to the finals stage to win the trophy this year by beating Castleford by the score of 22–18. The match was played at Headingley, Leeds, now in West Yorkshire. The attendance was 12,686 and receipts were £36,327. It was the third time in the incredible eleven-year period in which Castleford. previously only once winners in 1977, will make eight appearances in the Yorkshire Cup final, winning on four and ending as runner-up on four occasions.

== Background ==
The Rugby Football League's Yorkshire Cup competition was a knock-out competition between (mainly professional) rugby league clubs from the county of Yorkshire. The actual area was at times increased to encompass other teams from outside the county such as Newcastle, Mansfield, Coventry, and even London (in the form of Acton & Willesden). The Rugby League season always (until the onset of "Summer Rugby" in 1996) ran from around August-time through to around May-time and this competition always took place early in the season, in the Autumn, with the final taking place in (or just before) December (The only exception to this was when disruption of the fixture list was caused during, and immediately after, the two World Wars).

== Competition and results ==
=== Preliminary round ===
Involved 1 match and 2 clubs

Game No	Fixture Date	Home team	Score	Away team	Venue	Att	Rec	Notes	Ref
P1	Wed 4 Sep 1985	Castleford	38–6	Sheffield Eagles	Wheldon Road	1748		(Note: This is the first Yorkshire Cup match played by Sheffield Eagles, newly elected to the league)	

=== Round 1 ===
Involved 8 matches (with no byes) and 16 clubs

Game No	Fixture Date	Home team	Score	Away team	Venue	Att	Rec	Notes	Ref
1	Sun 15 Sep 1985	Batley	10–14	Dewsbury	Mount Pleasant	2148			
2	Sun 15 Sep 1985	Bradford Northern	40–15	Wakefield Trinity	Odsal	3180			
3	Sun 15 Sep 1985	Bramley	22–10	Doncaster	McLaren Field	582			
4	Sun 15 Sep 1985	Castleford	60–2	Hunslet	Wheldon Road	2708			
5	Sun 15 Sep 1985	Halifax	52–14	Huddersfield Barracudas	Thrum Hall	2516			
6	Sun 15 Sep 1985	Hull Kingston Rovers	12–10	Hull F.C.	Craven Park (1)	10115			
7	Sun 15 Sep 1985	Leeds	60–12	Keighley	Headingley	4775			
8	Sun 15 Sep 1985	York	18–26	Featherstone Rovers	Clarence Street	2283			

=== Round 2 - Quarter-finals ===
Involved 4 matches and 8 clubs

Game No	Fixture Date	Home team	Score	Away team	Venue	Att	Rec	Notes	Ref
1	Wed 25 Sep 1985	Dewsbury	2–48	Leeds	Crown Flatt	3700			
2	Wed 25 Sep 1985	Featherstone Rovers	11–22	Bradford Northern	Post Office Road	2185			
3	Wed 25 Sep 1985	Halifax	4–24	Castleford	Thrum Hall	4012			
4	Wed 25 Sep 1985	Hull Kingston Rovers	30–6	Bramley	Craven Park (1)	3959			

=== Round 3 – Semi-finals ===
Involved 2 matches and 4 clubs

Game No	Fixture Date	Home team	Score	Away team	Venue	Att	Rec	Notes	Ref
1	Wed 2 Oct 1985	Hull Kingston Rovers	11–5	Bradford Northern	Craven Park (1)	6008			
2	Wed 2 Oct 1985	Leeds	10–14	Castleford	Headingley	10281			

=== Final ===
Game No	Fixture Date	Home team	Score	Away team	Venue	Att	Rec	Notes	Ref
	Sunday 27 October 1985	Hull Kingston Rovers	22–18	Castleford	Headingley	12,686	£36,327	(Note: Headingley, Leeds, is the home ground of Leeds RLFC with a capacity of 21,000. The record attendance was 40,175 for a league match between Leeds and Bradford Northern on 21 May 1947.)	

==== Teams and scorers ====
Hull Kingston Rovers	No.	Castleford
	teams	
George Fairbairn	1	Gary Lord
Garry Clark	2	David Plange
John Dorahy	3	Tony Marchant
Gary Prohm	4	Gary Hyde
David Laws	5	Tony Spears
Gordon Smith	6	Steve Diamond
Paul Harkin	7	Robert "Bob" Beardmore
Peter Johnston	8	Kevin Ward
David Watkinson	9	Kevin Beardmore
Asuquo "Zook" Ema	10	Barry Johnson
Chris Burton	11	Keith England
Phil Hogan	12	Martin Ketteridge
Gavin Miller	13	John Joyner
John Lydiat (for George Fairbairn)	14	David Roockley
Andy Kelly (for Phil Hogan)	15	Ian Fletcher
Roger Millward	Coach	Malcolm "Mal" Reilly
22	score	18
10	HT	6
	Scorers	
	Tries	
Garry Clark (1)	T	Tony Marchant (2)
Gavin Miller (2)	T	Robert "Bob" Beardmore (1)
	Goals	
John Dorahy (5)	G	Steve Diamond (1)
	G	Robert "Bob" Beardmore (2)
Referee		Ron Campbell (Widnes)
White Rose Trophy for Man of the match		Gavin Miller - Hull KR - Loose forward
sponsored by		
Competition Sponsor		John Smith's Brewery Tadcaster

Scoring - Try = four points - Goal = two points - Drop goal = one point

=== The road to success ===
First round
Hull Kingston Rovers	12
Hull F.C.	10
Bramley	22
Doncaster	10
York	18
Featherstone Rovers	26
Bradford Northern	40
Wakefield Trinity	15
Batley	10
Dewsbury	14
Leeds	60
Keighley	12
Halifax	52
Huddersfield Barracudas	14
Castleford	60
Hunslet	2

Second round
Hull Kingston Rovers	30
Bramley	6
Featherstone Rovers	11
Bradford Northern	22
Dewsbury	2
Leeds	48
Halifax	4
Castleford	24

Semi-finals
Hull Kingston Rovers	11
Bradford Northern	5
Leeds	10
Castleford	14

Final
Hull Kingston Rovers	22
Castleford	18

== See also ==
- 1985–86 Rugby Football League season
- Rugby league county cups
