= Kevin Beardmore =

GB & England international rugby league footballer (1960–2022)

Personal information
- Born: 21 June 1960 Castleford, West Riding of Yorkshire, England
- Died: 14 November 2022 (aged 62)

Playing information
- Position: Hooker, Prop
Club
Years	Team	Pld	T	G	FG	P
1978–92	Castleford	247	80	0	0	297
1985	Canberra Raiders	2	0	0	0	0
	Total	249	80	0	0	297
Representative
Years	Team	Pld	T	G	FG	P
1987–89	Yorkshire	3	0	0	0	0
1984	England	1	0	0	0	0
1984–90	Great Britain	14	1	0	0	4
- Relatives: Bob Beardmore (brother)

Kevin Beardmore (21 June 1960 – 14 November 2022) was an English professional rugby league footballer who played in the 1970s, 1980s and 1990s. He played at representative level for Great Britain, England and Yorkshire, and at club level for Castleford, as a hooker or prop.

== Background ==
Beardmore was born on 21 June 1960 in Castleford, West Riding of Yorkshire. He was educated at Airedale High School.

== Playing career ==
=== Club career ===
Beardmore debuted for Castleford in 1979, but spent his first three years at the club as a backup to first-choice hooker, Bob Spurr. He established himself in the first team during the 1982–83 season, scoring 16 tries.

Beardmore played hooker in Castleford's 15–14 victory over Hull Kingston Rovers in the 1986 Challenge Cup Final during the 1985–86 season at Wembley Stadium, London on Saturday 3 May 1986.

Beardmore played hooker in Castleford's 18–22 defeat by Hull Kingston Rovers in the 1986 Yorkshire Cup Final during the 1986–87 season at Headingley, Leeds on Sunday 27 October 1985, played hooker, scored 2-tries, and was man of the match winning the White Rose Trophy in the 31–24 victory over Hull F.C. in the 1986 Yorkshire Cup Final during the 1986–87 season at Headingley, Leeds on Saturday 11 October 1986, played hooker in the 12–12 draw with Bradford Northern in the 1987 Yorkshire Cup Final during the 1987–88 season at Headingley, Leeds on Saturday 17 October 1987, did not play (Kenny Hill playing Hooker) in the 2–11 defeat by Bradford Northern in the 1987 Yorkshire Cup Final replay during the 1987–88 season at Elland Road, Leeds on Saturday 31 October 1987, and played hooker in the 12–33 defeat by Leeds in the 1988 Yorkshire Cup Final during the 1988–89 season at Elland Road, Leeds on Sunday 16 October 1988.

Beardmore's Testimonial match at Castleford took place in 1988.

=== Representative honours ===
Beardmore won a cap for England while at Castleford in 1984 against Wales, and won caps for Great Britain while at Castleford in 1984 against New Zealand (sub), in 1987 against France (2 matches), in 1988 against France (2 matches), Papua New Guinea, France (2 matches), and New Zealand, in 1989 against France (2 matches), and New Zealand, and in 1990 against France (2 matches).

Beardmore was selected to go on the 1988 Great Britain Lions tour of Australasia.

Beardmore won caps for Yorkshire while at Castleford, he played hooker in the 16–10 victory over Lancashire at Wigan's stadium on 16 September 1987, the 24–14 victory over Lancashire at Leeds' stadium on 21 September 1988, and the 56–12 victory over Lancashire at Wigan's stadium on 20 September 1989.

== Honoured at Castleford Tigers ==
Kevin Beardmore is a Tigers Hall Of Fame Inductee.

== Personal life and death ==
Kevin Beardmore was the twin brother of the rugby league footballer, Bob Beardmore, and the younger brother of Kenneth Beardmore, and Janet Beardmore.

Beardmore died on 14 November 2022, at the age of 62.
