= Winter of 1985–86 in Great Britain and Ireland =

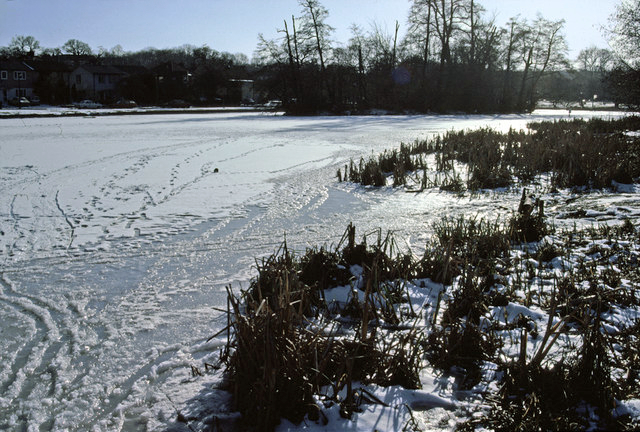
- A frozen lake in Enfield in February 1986

Meteorological history
- Formed: 14 November 1985
- Dissipated: April 1986

Meteorological information
- Lowest temp: −21.2 °C (−6.2 °F) 27 February 1986, Grantown-on-Spey

Overall effects
- Areas affected: Great Britain and Ireland

The Winter of 1985–1986 in Great Britain and Ireland contained two periods of notably cold weather. November 1985 brought an early start to winter with the month being the coldest in the Central England region since 1925, with an average temperature of 3.8 °C (38.8 °F). However, December was milder than average and January close to average before February became the coldest month of any kind since January 1963 with an average temperature of −1.0 °C (30.2 °F). March and April were also below average, especially April which was the coldest since 1922 with an average temperature of just 5.8 °C (42.4 °F).

== Timeline ==
Below is a timeline of the notable events of each month that took place during this winter.

=== November 1985 ===
November 1985 was the coldest November since 1922 with an average temperature of 4.1 °C (39.4 °F). This month also contained the second lowest November temperature recorded in the UK, −20.9 °C (−5.6 °F) at Kinbrace on the 30th. On the previous day, the 29th, the maximum at Kinbrace was −10.5 °C (13.1 °F) which is the lowest November daily maximum temperature recorded in either the UK or Ireland.

The winter began with a very severe frost on 14 November in parts of southeast England where −8 °C (17.6 °F) was recorded. By the 19th, accumulations of snow were slight, around 5 centimetres (2.0 in) in most places but on the 20th, Jersey recorded a depth of 12 centimetres (4.7 in). It was then slightly less cold until the 27th when it turned very wintry and cold again, especially in Scotland. On the 27th, there was a snow depth of 12 centimetres (4.7 in) in Shetland. Temperatures were below freezing for most places from the 27th–29th. On the night of the 28th/29th, −14 °C (6.8 °F) was recorded in parts of central Scotland. Then, late on the 30th, much warmer air spread in from the southwest leading to exceptionally mild weather. Overall, snow fell on up to 19 days in parts of Scotland.

=== December 1985 ===
December 1985 was a much milder month with an average temperature of 6.3 °C (43.3 °F) which is 1.7 °C (3 °F) above the 1961–1990 average. The month began exceptionally mild with Chivenor, Devon recording 17.7 °C (63.9 °F) which is the highest December temperature ever recorded in England. It was generally milder than average up until Christmas Day when a cold snap began that mainly affected the north. Snow showers started falling and there was a temperature of −17 °C (1.4 °F) recorded at Glenlivet on the 30th. Overall, much of the country was wetter than average with isolated areas in south east England, south west England and eastern Scotland recording over 200% of average rainfall.

=== January 1986 ===
January 1986 had an average temperature of 3.6 °C (38.5 °F) which is 0.2 °C (0.4 °F) below the 1961–1990 average. The month was also wetter than average with some places in Northern England recording 200% of the average January rainfall. On the 28th and 29th a low moved south east over Great Britain bringing snow to parts of Central England northwards. This then turned the wind into the east, setting up the pattern for the bitterly cold February that followed.

=== February 1986 ===
February 1986 was an exceptionally cold month, the coldest since January 1963 with an average temperature of −1.1 °C (30.0 °F). It was also the 5th coldest February since records began in 1659. Throughout the month, snow cover was widespread as temperatures did not get high enough for it to melt away. It was also very dull in the east with Cupar, Fife only recording 41 hours of sunshine all month. Conversely, in the west it was an exceptionally dry and sunny month with Anglesey recording 144 hours of sunshine and some stations in western Britain recording no precipitation all month. The month had persistently low daytime temperatures with the highest all month being only 1 °C (33.8 °F) at Buxton and Widdybank Fell, County Durham recorded 32 consecutive days below freezing. Early in the month there was also some freezing rain in the North and Midlands with 50mm (2") of glaze being recorded at Buxton. The lowest temperature of the month and of the winter was −21.2 °C (−6.2 °F) at Grantown-on-Spey on the 27th.

=== March 1986 ===
March 1986 averaged at 4.9 °C (40.8 °F) which is 0.8 °C (1.4 °F) below the 1961–1990 average. The cold weather of February persisted into early March, with blizzards in England on the 1st and a temperature of −16 °C (3.2 °F) recorded at Aviemore. The thaw began in all areas on the 4th. Later in the month it was very windy with a gust of 173 miles per hour (278.4 km/h) recorded on the 20th at Cairngorm.

=== April 1986 ===
April 1986 averaged at 5.8 °C (42.4 °F) which is 2.1 °C (3.8 °F) below the 1961–1990 average and the coldest since 1922. The temperature reached 15 °C (59.0 °F) for the first time on 4 April, and 18 °C (64.4 °F) for the first time on 26 April. There was 19 days of snow at Glenlivet. It was also a wetter than average month.
