= 1983–84 Rugby Football League season =

- League: Slalom Lager Championship
- Teams: First Division: 16; Second Division: 18

First Division
- Champions: Hull Kingston Rovers (4th title)
- Premiership winners: Hull Kingston Rovers
- Man of Steel Award: (England) Joe Lydon
- Top point-scorer: (England) John Woods (355)
- Top try-scorer: (England) Garry Schofield (38)

Promotion and relegation
- Promoted from Second Division: Barrow; Workington Town; Hunslet; Halifax
- Relegated to Second Division: Fulham; Wakefield Trinity; Salford; Whitehaven

Second Division
- Champions: Barrow
- Runners-up: Workington Town
- Top try-scorer: (England) Graham King (28)
- Joined league: Kent Invicta

The 1983–84 Rugby Football League season was the 89th ever season of professional rugby league football in Britain. Sixteen teams competed from August, 1983 until May, 1984 for the Slalom Lager Championship.

The Second Division was increased to 18 clubs with the introduction of Kent Invicta, who played their home fixtures at Maidstone, this season.

== Rule changes ==
End of possession:

- A "handover" was introduced after the sixth tackle, replacing the scrum that had previously been formed at that point. The team receiving possession would now play-the-ball to carry on play.
- Scrum rules were changed which meant the non offending side had head and ball advantage, effectively making the scrum a non contest.

Value of a try:

- The number of points a team scored from a try increased from three to four. The aim of this change was to "incentivise scoring tries" over kicking penalty goals, which were worth two points, because the tries were more entertaining.

Temporary suspension:

- The 10-minute "sin bin" was introduced.

== Season summary ==
In September 1983, the ban on international transfers between England and Australia was lifted. This resulted in a big influx of Australian players being signed by clubs on short-term contracts, most notably Test stand-off and future Australia captain Wally Lewis, who signed for Wakefield Trinity.

Slalom Lager League Champions: Hull Kingston Rovers

Hull Kingston Rovers finished on top of the First Division table to claim their fifth championship, and also the Rugby League Premiership competition, this was the first occasion the 'Championship / Premiership Double' had been achieved.

State Express Challenge Cup Winners: Widnes (19-6 v Wigan)

John Player Special Trophy Winners: Leeds (18-10 v Widnes). During the competition, Danny Wilson of Swinton scored a record 5 drop goals in the tie against Hunslet on 6 Nov 1983.

Slalom Lager Premiership Trophy Winners: Hull Kingston Rovers (18-10 v Castleford)

Barrow beat Widnes 12–8 to win the Lancashire County Cup, and Hull F.C. beat Castleford 13–2 to win the Yorkshire County Cup

=== 1983/84 Queensland Tour ===
At the end of the 1983 seasons in Queensland and New South Wales, the Queensland team also toured Papua New Guinea and England. Their tour of Great Britain saw them play three matches. The first against Hull Kingston Rovers resulted in an 8–6 loss, though the Wally Lewis-led Maroons then easily won their remaining matches against Wigan (40–2) and Leeds (58–2)

== First Division ==
Pos	Team	Pld	W	D	L	PF	PA	PP	Pts	Qualification or relegation
1	Hull Kingston Rovers (C)	30	22	2	6	795	421	188.8	46	Qualification for Premiership play-offs
2	Hull	30	22	1	7	831	401	207.2	45	Qualification for Premiership play-offs
3	Warrington	30	19	2	9	622	528	117.8	40	Qualification for Premiership play-offs
4	Castleford	30	18	3	9	686	438	156.6	39	Qualification for Premiership play-offs
5	Widnes	30	19	1	10	656	457	143.5	39	Qualification for Premiership play-offs
6	St Helens	30	18	1	11	649	507	128.0	37	Qualification for Premiership play-offs
7	Bradford Northern	30	17	2	11	519	379	136.9	36	Qualification for Premiership play-offs
8	Leeds	30	15	3	12	553	514	107.6	33	Qualification for Premiership play-offs
9	Wigan	30	16	0	14	533	465	114.6	32	
10	Oldham	30	15	2	13	544	480	113.3	32	
11	Leigh	30	14	0	16	623	599	104.0	28	
12	Featherstone Rovers	30	11	2	17	464	562	82.6	24	
13	Fulham (R)	30	9	1	20	401	694	57.8	19	Relegated to Second Division
14	Wakefield Trinity (R)	30	7	0	23	415	780	53.2	14	Relegated to Second Division
15	Salford (R)	30	5	0	25	352	787	44.7	10	Relegated to Second Division
16	Whitehaven (R)	30	3	0	27	325	956	34.0	6	Relegated to Second Division

Rules for classification: 1) Points; 2) Points scored percentage (points scored divided by points conceded)
(C) Champions; (R) Relegated

== Second Division ==
Pos	Team	Pld	W	D	L	PF	PA	PP	Pts	Promotion
1	Barrow (C, P)	34	32	0	2	1126	332	339.2	64	Promoted to First Division
2	Workington Town (P)	34	24	2	8	714	504	141.7	50	Promoted to First Division
3	Hunslet (P)	34	24	0	10	900	597	150.8	48	Promoted to First Division
4	Halifax (P)	34	23	2	9	722	539	134.0	48	Promoted to First Division
5	Blackpool Borough	34	20	3	11	615	466	132.0	43	
6	Swinton	34	21	0	13	764	437	174.8	42	
7	York	34	19	2	13	743	570	130.4	40	
8	Bramley	34	16	2	16	584	545	107.2	34	
9	Kent Invicta	34	17	0	17	595	700	85.0	34	
10	Huddersfield	34	15	3	16	600	545	110.1	33	
11	Cardiff City Blue Dragons	34	15	1	18	710	717	99.0	31	
12	Rochdale Hornets	34	13	3	18	551	667	82.6	29	
13	Batley	34	13	0	21	477	738	64.6	26	
14	Dewsbury	34	12	0	22	526	698	75.4	24	
15	Carlisle	34	12	0	22	539	780	69.1	24	
16	Huyton	34	9	2	23	431	760	56.7	20	
17	Keighley	34	7	3	24	425	728	58.4	17	
18	Doncaster	34	2	1	31	384	1083	35.5	5	

Rules for classification: 1) Points; 2) Points scored percentage (points scored divided by points conceded)
(C) Champions; (P) Promoted

== Premiership ==
12 May 1984

Hull Kingston Rovers (1)	18-10	Castleford (4)
T-Smith M, Prohm, Laws, Dorahy; G-Dorahy		T-Kear; G-Beardmore (3)

Headingley Stadium
Attendance: 12,515
Player of the Match: John Dorahy

== Sources ==
- 1983-84 Rugby Football League season at wigan.rlfans.com
