= 1984–85 Rugby Football League season =

- League: Slalom Lager Championship
- Teams: First Division: 16; Second Division: 20

First Division
- Champions: Hull Kingston Rovers (5th title)
- Premiership winners: St. Helens
- Man of Steel: (England) Ellery Hanley
- Top point-scorer: (England) Sean Day (362)
- Top try-scorer: (England) Ellery Hanley (55)

Promotion and relegation
- Promoted from Second Division: Swinton; Salford; York; Dewsbury
- Relegated to Second Division: Barrow; Leigh; Hunslet; Workington Town

Second Division
- Champions: Swinton
- Runners-up: Salford
- Top try-scorer: (England) Vince Gribbin (27)
- Joined league: Mansfield Marksmen; Sheffield Eagles

The 1984–85 Rugby Football League season was the 90th ever season of professional rugby league football in Britain. Sixteen teams played each other from August 1984 until May 1985 for the Slalom Lager Championship. Also these 16 teams plus several more competed for the Challenge Cup.

== Season summary ==
- Slalom Lager League Champions: Hull Kingston Rovers
- Silk Cut Challenge Cup Winners: Wigan (8 – 28–24 v Hull)
- Slalom Lager Premiership Trophy Winners: St. Helens (36–16 v Hull Kingston Rovers at Elland Road, Leeds)
  - Harry Sunderland Trophy: Harry Pinner
- John Player Special Trophy Winners: Hull Kingston Rovers (12–0 v Hull F.C. at Boothferry Park, Hull)
- Burtonwood Brewery Lancashire County Cup Winners: St. Helens (26–18 v Wigan at Central Park, Wigan)
- 2nd Division Champions: Swinton

Aside from retaining the Championship Hull Kingston Rovers won the John Player Special Trophy and reached the finals of both the Premiership and Yorkshire Cup, they were beaten in the Semi-Final of the Challenge Cup meaning they played in every possible game of the season bar one.

On 21 October 1984 Peter Wood kicked a record-equalling five drop goals for Runcorn Highfield in a match against Batley. On 28 October, two tries by Mal Meninga inspire St. Helens, to beat Wigan 26–18, and win the Lancashire County Cup for the first time in 16 years.

The 1985 Man of Steel Award went to Bradford Northern utility back, Ellery Hanley. He also became the first man to score more than 50 tries in a season since Billy Boston, and the first non-winger to reach this figure for 70 years.

The increase of the Second Division to 20 teams meant that it would have taken 38 rounds to play out a full double round robin, which was considered too many matches, so a complicated fixture formula was used to reduce it to 28. For this season, Huyton relocated and were renamed Runcorn Highfield, Cardiff City Blue Dragons relocated and were renamed Bridgend Blue Dragons, and Kent Invicta relocated and were renamed were Southend Invicta, Huddersfield were renamed Huddersfield Barracudas, and Mansfield Marksman, and Sheffield Eagles joined the Second Division. As of 2025, 11th in the Second Division is the lowest position that Wakefield Trinity have ever finished.

St. Helens beat Wigan 26–18 to win the Lancashire County Cup, and Hull F.C. beat Hull Kingston Rovers 29–12 to win the Yorkshire County Cup.

== First Division ==
Pos	Team	Pld	W	D	L	PF	PA	PP	Pts	Qualification or relegation
1	Hull Kingston Rovers (C)	30	24	0	6	778	391	199.0	48	Qualification for Premiership first round
2	St Helens	30	22	1	7	920	508	181.1	45	Qualification for Premiership first round
3	Wigan	30	21	1	8	720	459	156.9	43	Qualification for Premiership first round
4	Leeds	30	20	1	9	650	377	172.4	41	Qualification for Premiership first round
5	Oldham	30	18	1	11	563	439	128.2	37	Qualification for Premiership first round
6	Hull	30	17	1	12	733	550	133.3	35	Qualification for Premiership first round
7	Widnes	30	17	0	13	580	517	112.2	34	Qualification for Premiership first round
8	Bradford Northern	30	16	1	13	600	500	120.0	33	Qualification for Premiership first round
9	Featherstone Rovers	30	15	0	15	461	475	97.1	30	
10	Halifax	30	12	2	16	513	565	90.8	26	
11	Warrington	30	13	0	17	530	620	85.5	26	
12	Castleford	30	12	1	17	552	518	106.6	25	
13	Barrow (R)	30	9	1	20	483	843	57.3	19	Relegated to Second Division
14	Leigh (R)	30	8	2	20	549	743	73.9	18	Relegated to Second Division
15	Hunslet (R)	30	7	1	22	463	952	48.6	15	Relegated to Second Division
16	Workington Town (R)	30	2	1	27	297	935	31.8	5	Relegated to Second Division

Rules for classification: 1) Points; 2) Points scored percentage (points scored divided by points conceded)
(C) Champions; (R) Relegated

== Second Division ==
Pos	Team	Pld	W	D	L	PF	PA	PP	Pts	Promotion
1	Swinton (C, P)	28	24	1	3	727	343	212.0	49	Promoted to First Division
2	Salford (P)	28	20	3	5	787	333	236.3	43	Promoted to First Division
3	Dewsbury (P)	28	21	1	6	539	320	168.4	43	Promoted to First Division
4	York (P)	28	21	1	6	717	430	166.7	43	Promoted to First Division
5	Carlisle	28	18	0	10	547	437	125.2	36	
6	Whitehaven	28	16	3	9	496	385	128.8	35	
7	Batley	28	17	0	11	489	402	121.6	34	
8	Fulham	28	16	1	11	521	526	99.0	33	
9	Mansfield Marksman	28	15	0	13	525	398	131.9	30	
10	Blackpool Borough	28	15	0	13	486	434	112.0	30	
11	Wakefield Trinity	28	12	2	14	450	459	98.0	26	
12	Rochdale Hornets	28	12	2	14	436	466	93.6	26	
13	Huddersfield Barracudas	28	12	1	15	476	476	100.0	25	
14	Keighley	28	12	0	16	495	567	87.3	24	
15	Runcorn Highfield	28	11	1	16	462	538	85.9	23	
16	Bramley	28	9	2	17	439	492	89.2	20	
17	Sheffield Eagles	28	8	0	20	424	582	72.9	16	
18	Doncaster	28	6	2	20	353	730	48.4	14	
19	Southend	28	4	0	24	347	690	50.3	8	
20	Bridgend Blue Dragons	28	1	0	27	258	966	26.7	2	

Rules for classification: 1) Points; 2) Points scored percentage (points scored divided by points conceded)
(C) Champions; (P) Promoted

== Premiership ==
11 May 1985

St Helens (2)	36-16	Hull Kingston Rovers (1)
T-Veivers, Ledger (2), Meninga (2), Ainsworth, Pinner; G-Day (4)		T-Fairbairn, Robinson, Laws; G-Fairbairn (2)

Elland Road
Attendance: 15,518
Referee: Stan Wall
Player of the Match: Harry Pinner

== Sources ==
- 1984–85 Rugby Football League season at rlhalloffame.org.uk
- 1984–85 Rugby Football League season at wigan.rlfans.com
- Great Britain Competitions 1984–1985 at hunterlink.net.au
- 1985 Challenge Cup Final at wigan.rlfans.com
