= 1985–86 Rugby Football League season =

- League: Slalom Lager Championship
- Teams: First Division: 16; Second Division: 18

First Division
- Champions: Halifax (4th title)
- Premiership winners: Warrington
- Man of Steel Award: (Australia) Gavin Miller
- Top try-scorer: (England) Ellery Hanley (63)

Promotion and relegation
- Promoted from Second Division: Leigh; Barrow; Wakefield Trinity
- Relegated to Second Division: York; Swinton; Dewsbury

Second Division
- Champions: Leigh
- Runners-up: Barrow
- Top point-scorer: (England) Chris Johnson (400)
- Top try-scorer: (England) John Henderson (27)
- Left league: Bridgend Blue Dragons Southend Invicta

The 1985–86 Rugby Football League season was the 91st ever season of professional rugby league football in Britain. Sixteen teams competed from August, 1985 until May, 1986 for the Slalom Lager Championship.

== Season summary ==
Slalom Lager League Champions were Halifax.
Halifax finished on top of the First Division table to claim their fourth championship, but Warrington defeated them in the Rugby League Premiership competition.
Paul Bishop of Warrington scored a record equalling 5 drop goals in the Premiership semi-final against Wigan on 11 May 1986.

Castleford were 15–14 winners over Hull Kingston Rovers in the Silk Cut Challenge Cup.

Wigan were 11–8 winners over Hull Kingston Rovers in the final for the John Player Special Trophy.

Warrington were 38–10 winners over Halifax in the Premiership Trophy. Warrington's Australian forward Les Boyd was awarded the Harry Sunderland Trophy as man-of-the-match.

2nd Division Champions were Leigh.
Bridgend Blue Dragons and Southend Invicta dropped out of the competition. The promotion scheme was changed to 3-up 3-down.

Wigan beat Warrington 34–8 to win the Lancashire County Cup, and Hull Kingston Rovers beat Castleford 22–18 to win the Yorkshire County Cup.

== First Division ==
Pos	Team	Pld	W	D	L	PF	PA	PP	Pts	Qualification or relegation
1	Halifax (C)	30	19	6	5	499	365	136.7	44	Qualification for Premiership first round
2	Wigan	30	20	3	7	776	300	258.7	43	Qualification for Premiership first round
3	St Helens	30	20	2	8	729	503	144.9	42	Qualification for Premiership first round
4	Warrington	30	20	1	9	665	393	169.2	41	Qualification for Premiership first round
5	Widnes	30	19	3	8	520	454	114.5	41	Qualification for Premiership first round
6	Leeds	30	15	3	12	554	518	106.9	33	Qualification for Premiership first round
7	Hull Kingston Rovers	30	16	1	13	507	500	101.4	33	Qualification for Premiership first round
8	Hull	30	15	2	13	616	508	121.3	32	Qualification for Premiership first round
9	Oldham	30	13	4	13	524	549	95.4	30	
10	Salford	30	14	0	16	508	561	90.6	28	
11	Castleford	30	12	1	17	551	585	94.2	25	
12	Bradford Northern	30	11	1	18	447	473	94.5	23	
13	Featherstone Rovers	30	9	3	18	419	616	68.0	21	
14	York (R)	30	9	0	21	413	592	69.8	18	Relegated to Second Division
15	Swinton (R)	30	8	0	22	371	648	57.3	16	Relegated to Second Division
16	Dewsbury (R)	30	5	0	25	313	847	37.0	10	Relegated to Second Division

Rules for classification: 1) Points; 2) Points scored percentage (points scored divided by points conceded)
(C) Champions; (R) Relegated

== Second Division ==
Pos	Team	Pld	W	D	L	PF	PA	PP	Pts	Qualification
1	Leigh (C, P)	34	33	0	1	1156	373	309.9	66	Promotion to First Division
2	Barrow (P)	34	27	0	7	1012	398	254.3	54	Promotion to First Division
3	Wakefield Trinity (P)	34	24	1	9	680	435	156.3	49	Promotion to First Division
4	Whitehaven	34	22	0	12	619	479	129.2	44	
5	Rochdale Hornets	34	21	0	13	763	485	157.3	42	
6	Blackpool Borough	34	20	0	14	769	570	134.9	40	
7	Batley	34	18	3	13	567	450	126.0	39	
8	Bramley	34	17	1	16	608	663	91.7	35	
9	Fulham	34	16	1	17	679	709	95.8	33	
10	Doncaster	34	16	1	17	611	650	94.0	33	
11	Carlisle	34	15	2	17	585	682	85.8	32	
12	Sheffield Eagles	34	14	1	19	516	617	83.6	29	
13	Workington Town	34	13	0	21	684	723	94.6	26	
14	Hunslet	34	11	3	20	594	795	74.7	25	
15	Huddersfield Barracudas	34	8	4	22	542	841	64.4	20	
16	Runcorn Highfield	34	9	2	23	489	790	61.9	20	
17	Keighley	34	9	2	23	401	918	43.7	20	
18	Mansfield Marksman	34	2	1	31	383	1080	35.5	5	

Rules for classification: 1) Points; 2) Points scored percentage (points scored divided by points conceded)
(C) Champions; (P) Promoted

== Premiership ==
18 May 1986

Warrington (4)	38 – 10	Halifax (1)
Tries: Johnson, Forster, Bishop, Boyd (2), Tamati, Jackson; Goals: Bishop (5)		Tries: C. Anderson; Goals: Whitfield (3)

Elland Road
Attendance: 13,683
Referee: Fred Lindop
Player of the Match: Les Boyd

== Sources ==
- 1985-86 Rugby Football League season at wigan.rlfans.com
