= 1979 Great Britain Lions tour =

- Date: 25 May 1979 – 13 August 1979
- Manager: Harry Womersley; Dick Gemmell
- Coach(es): Eric Ashton
- Tour captain(s): Doug Laughton
- Top point scorer(s): John Woods (171)
- Top try scorer(s): Steve Evans (16)
Summary
P	W	D	L
Total
27	21	1	5
Test match
6	2	0	4
Opponent
P	W	D	L
Australia
3	0	0	3
New Zealand
3	2	0	1

Tour chronology
- Previous tour: 1974
- Next tour: 1984

The 1979 Great Britain Lions tour was the Great Britain national rugby league team's 16th tour of Australasia and took place from May to August 1979. A total of 27 matches were played against local club and representative sides during the tour, including a three match Test match series against Australia and New Zealand respectively.

== Touring squad ==
In March 1979, a 30-man squad was selected for the tour, with Doug Laughton appointed as captain. The squad included Widnes prop Jim Mills, who was banned from playing in New Zealand due to an incident in 1975 when Mills played for Wales against New Zealand. Despite an appeal to overturn the ban, the International Board confirmed the ban would be upheld.

After the squad was selected, John Bevan and Stuart Wright were forced to withdraw due to injury, and were replaced by Roy Mathias and David Barends. Ken Kelly also suffered an injury shortly before the tour departed, and was replaced by John Holmes.

Name	Position	Club	Apps	Tests	Tries	Goals	Drop goals	Points	Notes
Mick Adams	Forward	Widnes	16	5	0	8	1	17	
David Barends	Back	Bradford Northern	16	2	10	0	0	30	
John Burke	Forward	Wakefield Trinity	9	0	0	0	0	0	(Note: John Burke was called up as a replacement for Jim Mills due to injury.)
Len Casey	Forward	Bradford Northern	14	5	4	0	0	12	
Steve Evans	Back	Featherstone Rovers	19	6	16	0	0	48	
George Fairbairn	Back	Wigan	10	5	3	18	1	46	(Note: George Fairbairn was called up as a replacement for Tommy Martyn due to injury.)
Peter Glynn	Back	St Helens	15	0	6	0	0	18	
Jeff Grayshon	Forward	Bradford Northern	14	5	2	0	0	6	
Phil Hogan	Forward	Hull Kingston Rovers	14	4	5	0	0	15	
John Holmes	Back	Leeds	13	6	1	2	0	7	
Eric Hughes	Back	Widnes	17	6	8	0	0	24	
Melvyn James	Forward	St Helens	13	0	3	0	0	9	
John Joyner	Back	Castleford	14	6	6	0	0	18	
Doug Laughton (c)	Forward	Widnes	5	1	0	0	0	0	
Graham Liptrot	Forward	St Helens	11	0	1	0	0	3	
Brian Lockwood	Forward	Hull Kingston Rovers	12	1	1	0	0	3	
Tommy Martyn	Forward	Warrington	5	0	3	0	0	9	
Roy Mathias	Back	St Helens	17	1	10	0	0	30	
Jim Mills	Forward	Widnes	5	1	2	0	0	6	
Roger Millward	Back	Hull Kingston Rovers	3	0	0	4	0	8	(Note: David Topliss was called up as a replacement for Roger Millward due to injury.)
Keith Mumby	Back	Bradford Northern	13	0	1	8	0	19	
Steve Nash	Back	Salford	6	0	2	0	0	6	
George Nicholls	Forward	St Helens	13	6	2	0	0	6	
Steve Norton	Forward	Hull	9	2	0	0	0	0	
Alan Redfearn	Back	Bradford Northern	10	1	1	0	0	3	
Trevor Skerrett	Forward	Wakefield Trinity	12	4	1	0	0	3	
Mike Smith	Back	Hull Kingston Rovers	11	3	4	0	0	12	
Gary Stephens	Back	Castleford	15	5	6	0	0	18	
Charlie Stone	Forward	Hull	12	0	0	0	0	0	
David Topliss	Back	Wakefield Trinity	7	1	2	0	0	6	
David Ward	Forward	Leeds	11	6	0	0	0	0	
David Watkinson	Forward	Hull Kingston Rovers	12	1	2	0	0	6	
John Woods	Back	Leigh	17	4	12	67	1	171	

== Results ==
=== Australia ===
25 May 1979

North Queensland	5 – 29	Great Britain Lions
Tries: Ron Clark; Goals: Ron Clark (1)	Report	Tries: John Woods (2), Eric Hughes, John Joyner, Gary Stephens, David Watkinson; Goals: John Woods (5); Drop goals: John Woods (1)

John Breen Park, Mackay
Attendance: 6,200
Referee: Graham Reed

North Queensland: Frank Daisy, S. Bax, Michael Windeatt, Ron Clark, Rob Gallagher, M. Aguis, N. Appo, Trevor Deakin, Bob Abbott, Nick Moroko, Vern Daisy, John Kynaston, Peter Luppi (c). Reserves – Bruce Barclay, Greg Dowling. Coach – Peter Luppi

Great Britain: Peter Glynn, Eric Hughes, John Joyner, John Woods, Roy Mathias, Steve Evans, Gary Stephens, Jim Mills, David Watkinson, Brian Lockwood, Trevor Skerrett, George Nicholls, Doug Laughton (c). Reserves – Mike Smith, Mel James

27 May 1979

Central Queensland	11 – 20	Great Britain Lions
Tries: Jamie Mitchell; Goals: Lionel Cullen (4)	Report	Tries: Tommy Martyn (2), Eric Hughes, John Joyner; Goals: Roger Millward (4/5)

Rockhampton Showgrounds, Rockhampton
Attendance: 3,307
Referee: Noel Smith

Central Queensland: Greg Rehbein, Lionel Cullen, Greg Reynolds, Michael Goode, Chris Downie, Stuart Nobbs, Geoff Cowburn, Alan Cruasaz, Gordon Reid, Terry Farrar, Jamie Mitchell, John Bidgood, Graham Horstman. Reserves – Trevor Johnson. Coach – Paul Barrett

Great Britain: Peter Glynn, Phil Hogan, Eric Hughes, Mike Smith, Roy Mathias, Roger Millward (c), Steve Nash, Mel James, Graham Liptrot, Charlie Stone, Tommy Martyn, Mick Adams, Steve Norton. Reserves – John Joyner, David Watkinson

30 May 1979

Wide Bay	7 – 27	Great Britain Lions
Tries: Duncan Campbell; Goals: Doug Kelly (1); Mike Rosin (1)	Report	Tries: Steve Evans (2), Roy Mathias, Jim Mills; Goals: John Woods (6)

Eskdale Park, Maryborough
Attendance: 2,969
Referee: Bert Holland

Wide Bay: Mike Rosin, Dean jeffries, Pat O'Brien, Doug Kelly, Duncan Campbell, Greg Sutton, Ernie Edwards (c), Brian Geary, Bill Foreman, Billy Trevor, Kim McKenna, Bryan Niebling, Butch Cox. Reserves – Greg Henry, John Curran. Coach –

Great Britain: Roger Millward, Roy Mathias, Eric Hughes, John Woods, Peter Glynn, Steve Evans, Gary Stephens, Jim Mills, David Watkinson, Charlie Stone, George Nicholls, Tommy Martyn, Doug Laughton (c). Reserves – Phil Hogan

2 June 1979

NSW North Coast	6 – 33	Great Britain Lions
Tries: Phil Amidy, Errol Ruprecht	Report	Tries: Steve Evans (2), Phil Hogan (2), Roy Mathias (2), Trevor Skerrett; Goals: John Woods (6)

Les Burger Field, Tweed Heads
Attendance: 4,871

North Coast: Garry Chapman, Steve Bartier, Lance Randall, Greg Pensini, Gary Paxton, Phil Amidy, Tony Kennedy, Tony Price, Errol Ruprecht, Gary McQuillan, Rod Pattison, David Clay, Greg Warwick. Reserves – Gary Donnelly, David Welsh. Coach –

Great Britain: John Woods, Mike Smith, John Joyner, Phil Hogan, Roy Mathias, Steve Evans, Steve Nash, Mel James, Graham Liptrot, Mick Adams, Trevor Skerrett, Steve Norton (c). Reserves – Alan Redfearn, Jeff Grayshon

5 June 1979

Northern Division	11 – 20	Great Britain Lions
Tries: Les Cleal; Goals: Bernie Briggs (4)	Report	Tries: David Barends, Peter Glynn, Keith Mumby; Goals: John Woods (5/6); Drop goals: Mick Adams

Scully Park, Tamworth
Attendance: 7,600
Referee: Les Ballard

Northern Division: Robert Thomas, Les Cleal, Brian Walden, Bernie Briggs, Noel Cleal, Shane Matthews, Wayne Smith, Len Reardon, Maurice Thompson, Mick Lewis, Ian Kearney, Jim Leis, Tony Dean. Reserves – Gary Whackett, Phil Coleman. Coach – Don Adams

Great Britain: Keith Mumby, David Barends, Steve Evans, John Woods, Peter Glynn, Roger Millward (c), Gary Stephens, Mel James, David Ward, Charlie Stone, Tommy Martyn, Jeff Grayshon, Len Casey. Reserves – Eric Hughes, Mick Adams

8 June 1979

Queensland Firsts	19 – 25	Great Britain Lions
Tries: Colin Scott (2), Rohan Hancock; Goals: Ian Dauth (5)	Report	Tries: David Barends, Steve Evans, John Joyner, Jim Mills, George Nicholls; Goals: John Woods (5/6)

Lang Park, Brisbane
Attendance: 5,000
Referee: Joe Ticehurst

Queensland: Colin Scott, Brad Backer, Mark Payne, Chris Close, Ian Dauth, Alan Smith, Larry Brigginshaw, Peter Apps, Jay Hoffman, Rohan Hancock, Greg Platz (c), Bob Cock, Norm Carr. Reserves – Wally Lewis, Wayne Lindenberg. Coach – John McDonald

Great Britain: Keith Mumby, David Barends, John Joyner, Mike Smith, Roy Mathias, John Woods, Alan Redfearn, Jim Mills, David Ward, Trevor Skerrett, George Nicholls, Doug Laughton (c), Steve Norton. Reserves – Steve Evans, Len Casey

10 June 1979

Toowoomba	19 – 16	Great Britain Lions
Tries: Trevor Dunemann; Goals: Warren Green (8/11)	Report	Tries: Len Casey, Peter Glynn, Roy Mathias, Steve Nash; Goals: Keith Mumby (2)

Athletic Oval, Toowoomba
Attendance: 5,500
Referee: Ron Manson

Toowoomba: Cec Docherty, Mike Williams, Alan Smith, Wayne Balderson, Warren Green, Mick Ryan, Greg Robison, Rohan Hancock, Joel Duke, Ian Lindenmeyer, Peter Connell, Greg Platz (c), Trevor Dunemann. Reserves – Willy Weatherall, Scott Barkla, Wayne Jensen, Murray Challinor. Coach – Jeff Gill

Great Britain: Keith Mumby, David Barends, Peter Glynn, Phil Hogan, Roy Mathias, John Holmes, Steve Nash, Mel James, David Watkinson, Brian Lockwood (c), Tommy Martyn, Len Casey, Mick Adams. Reserves – Gary Stephens, Graham Liptrot, Jeff Grayshon

==== First Test ====
Greek born Canterbury-Bankstown hooker George Peponis became just the second player to captain the Australian team despite not being born in Australia, taking over from the first player to do so, the recently retired Warrington born 1978 Kangaroo tour captain Bob Fulton.

16 June 1979

Australia	35 – 0	Great Britain
Tries: Kerry Boustead (2); Ray Price (2); Larry Corowa; Goals: Michael Cronin (10/11)

Lang Park, Brisbane
Attendance: 23,051
Referee: Eddie Ward (Australia)
Player of the Match: Ray Price

Australia	Position	Great Britain
Graham Eadie	FB	John Woods
Larry Corowa	WG	David Barends
Steve Rogers	CE	John Joyner
Michael Cronin	CE	Eric Hughes
Kerry Boustead	WG	Roy Mathias
Alan Thompson	FE/SO	John Holmes
Tom Raudonikis	HB/SH	Gary Stephens
Rod Morris	PR	Trevor Skerrett
George Peponis (c)	HK	David Ward
Craig Young	PR	Jim Mills
Rod Reddy	SR	Doug Laughton (c)
Les Boyd	SR	George Nicholls
Ray Price	LK/LF	Steve Norton
	Int.	Steve Evans
	Int.	Phil Hogan
Frank Stanton	Coach	Eric Ashton

18 June 1979

Brisbane Firsts	7 – 10	Great Britain Lions
Tries: Chris Close; Goals: John Barber (2)	Report	Tries: David Barends, Tommy Martyn; Goals: John Holmes (2)

Lang Park, Brisbane
Attendance: 3,500
Referee: Joe Ticehurst

Brisbane Firsts: Peter Dutton, Terry Garside, Chris Close, Mal Meninga, Bligh Davidson, Mark Murray, Ross Strudwick, Dave Brown, John Lang, John Barber, J. McLoud, Des Morris (c), Norm Carr. Reserves – Mick Neill, Wally Lewis. Coach – Henry Holloway

Great Britain: Keith Mumby, David Barends, Steve Evans, Eric Hughes, Peter Glynn, John Holmes, Alan Redfearn (c), Mel James, Graham Liptrot, Charlie Stone, Tommy Martyn, Len Casey. Reserves – Trevor Skerrett

20 June 1979

NSW Southern Division	0 – 10	Great Britain Lions
Tries: John Burke, Peter Hall; Goals: Jim Hindmarsh (2)	Report	Tries: Steve Evans, Roy Mathias; Goals: Keith Mumby (2)

Orana Park, Campbelltown
Attendance: 4,000
Referee: Kevin Riolo

Southern Division: Les Williams, Wayne Sharpe, Peter Hall, Peter Benny, Glen Fitzgibbon, Greg Martin, Les Hannah, John Burke, Connell Byrne, Ron Warren (c), Peter Jirgens, Steve Gilligan, Jim Hindmarsh. Reserves – Brad Murray, Daryl Warwick. Coach – John Armstrong

Great Britain: Keith Mumby, David Barends, Steve Evans, Eric Hughes, Roy Mathias, Peter Glynn, Steve Nash, Mel James, David Watkinson, Brian Lockwood (c), Trevor Skerrett, George Nicholls, Len Casey. Reserves – Jeff Grayshon

24 June 1979

Newcastle Firsts	12 – 25	Great Britain Lions
Tries: Doug Lucas, Ziggy Niszczot; Goals: Pat Smith (3)	Report	Tries: David Barends, Peter Glynn, Eric Hughes, John Joyner, Gary Stephens; Goals: Mick Adams (5/7)

Newcastle International Sports Centre, Newcastle
Attendance: 14,570
Referee: Adrian Wilson

Newcastle Firsts: Jim Batey, Tony Filipuzzi, Neville Elwin, Owen Wallace, Ziggy Niszczot, Pat Smith (c), Rick Griffith, Dave Stafford, Allan Dagwell, Doug Lucas, Dave Edwards, Terry Donnelly, Peter Howlett. Reserves – Chris Lawler, Bob Everson. Coach – Allan Thomson

Great Britain:Keith Mumby, David Barends, John Joyner, Peter Glynn, Eric Hughes, John Holmes, Gary Stephens, Charlie Stone, David Ward, Brian Lockwood (c), Jeff Grayshon, Mick Adams, Steve Norton. Reserves – Steve Nash, Len Casey

26 June 1979

Riverina	10 – 37	Great Britain Lions
Tries: Phil Bishop (2); Goals: Robert Styles (2)	Report	Tries: Len Casey, Steve Evans, George Fairbairn, John Holmes, Steve Nash, David Watkinson, John Woods; Goals: George Fairbairn (5/5); John Woods (3)

Eric Weissel Oval, Wagga Wagga
Attendance: 8,403
Referee: Noel Bissett

Riverina: Robert Styles, Scott Hargrave, Anthony Wealand, Peter Rands (c), Brian Rosetto, Ernie Benton, Phil Bishop, Len Bertoldo, Larry Dimistrovsky, Brendon Lindsay, Greg Longhurst, Steve MacDonald, Ian O'Connell. Reserves – Greg Watt, Kerry Hemsley. Coach – Ron Crowe

Great Britain: George Fairbairn, David Barends, Steve Evans, John Woods, Eric Hughes (c), John Holmes, Steve Nash, John Burke, David Watkinson, Trevor Skerrett, George Nicholls, Phil Hogan, Mick Adams. Reserves – Roy Mathias, Len Casey

==== Second Test ====
30 June 1979

Australia	24 – 16	Great Britain
Tries: Michael Cronin (2); Rod Reddy; Steve Rogers; Goals: Michael Cronin (6/9)		Tries: Eric Hughes; John Joyner; Goals: John Woods (5/5)

Sydney Cricket Ground, Sydney
Attendance: 26,857
Referee: Greg Hartley (Australia)
Player of the Match: Rod Reddy

Australia	Position	Great Britain
Graham Eadie	FB	George Fairbairn
Larry Corowa	WG	David Barends
Steve Rogers	CE	John Joyner
Michael Cronin	CE	John Woods
Kerry Boustead	WG	Eric Hughes
Alan Thompson	FE/SO	John Holmes
Tom Raudonikis	HB/SH	Gary Stephens
Rod Morris	PR	Trevor Skerrett
George Peponis (c)	HK	David Ward
Craig Young	PR	George Nicholls (c)
Rod Reddy	SR	Jeff Grayshon
Les Boyd	SR	Len Casey
Ray Price	LK/LF	Mick Adams
	Int.	Steve Evans
	Int.	David Watkinson
Frank Stanton	Coach	Eric Ashton

1 July 1979

Illawarra Firsts	13 – 18	Great Britain Lions
Tries: John Penno, Tony Quirk, Kim Patrick (PT); Goals: Tony Quirk (2/7)	Report	Tries: Steve Evans, Peter Glynn, Jeff Grayshon, Roy Mathias; Goals: George Fairbairn (3/7)

Wollongong Showground, Wollongong
Attendance: 3,994
Referee: Tom Gustard

Illawarra Firsts: Tony Quirk, John Penno, Noel Sunaklis, Tim Edwards, Shane McKellar, Terry Westblade, Rick Patrick, Allan Fallah, Michael Prest, Chris De Leva, Steve Calder (c), Kon Demos. Reserves – Kim Patrick, Tim McLaren. Coach – Johnny Greaves

Great Britain: Keith Mumby, George Fairbairn, Steve Evans, Peter Glynn, Roy Mathias, Alan Redfearn (c), Gary Stephens, John Burke, David Watkinson, Charlie Stone, Graham Liptrot, Jeff Grayshon, Len Casey. Reserves – David Barends, Doug Laughton

4 July 1979

Western Division NSW	12 – 19	Great Britain Lions
Tries: Brian Johnston, John O'Connor; Goals: Steve McWhirter (3)	Report	Tries: Phil Hogan, Gary Stephens, John Woods; Goals: John Woods (5/5)

Wade Park, Orange
Attendance: 4,500
Referee: Giles O'Donnell

Western Division: John O'Connor, David Michael, Brian Johnston, Brian Godfrey, Tom Bunsworth, Steve Hall, Steve McWhirter, Ross Gibson, Col Dennis, Roger Beetson, Ross McDermott, Gary Taylor (c), Luke Rosser. Reserves – Mike Fish, Marshall Peachey. Coach – Bob Weir

Great Britain: Keith Mumby, David Barends, John Woods, Peter Glynn, Eric Hughes, David Topliss, Gary Stephens, John Burke, Graham Liptrot, Mel James, Brian Lockwood (c), Phil Hogan, Mick Adams. Reserves – Roy Mathias, David Watkinson

7 July 1979

NSW Firsts	17 – 19	Great Britain Lions
Tries: Geoff Gerard (2), Terry Fahey; Goals: John Dorahy (4)	Report	Tries: Steve Evans (2), George Fairbairn, John Woods; Goals: John Woods (3); Drop goals: George Fairbairn (1)

Sydney Cricket Ground, Sydney
Attendance: 8,902
Referee: Kevin Roberts

New South Wales: Allan McMahon, Neville Glover, John Dorahy, Peter Mortimer, Terry Fahey, Tony Trudgett, Steve Mortimer, Bruce Starkey, Ray Brown, Ron Hilditch, Steve Kneen, Geoff Gerard, Greg Pierce (c). Reserves – Steve Morris, Greg Cook. Coach – Frank Stanton

Great Britain: George Fairbairn, Eric Hughes, John Joyner, John Woods, Roy Mathias, David Topliss, Alan Redfearn, Trevor Skerrett, David Watkinson, George Nicholls (c), Jeff Grayshon, Phil Hogan, Mick Adams. Reserves – Steve Evans, David Ward

8 July 1979

Monaro	7 – 21	Great Britain Lions
Tries: Stan Jurd; Goals: Wayne Brownlie (1); Peter McGrath (1)	Report	Tries: John Woods (2), Gary Stephens; Goals: John Woods (6/6)

Seiffert Oval, Queanbeyan
Attendance: 6,500
Referee: Ray Collins

Monaro: Sam Vucago, Ross Knox, Simon Brockwell, Peter McGrath, David Hegarty, John Ballesty (c), Mick Schell, Stan Jurd, John Purcell, Doug Cameron, Ian Freeman, Wayne Brownlie, Colin Clarke. Reserves – Mike McCarthy, David Reid. Coach – Don Furner

Great Britain: Keith Mumby, Steve Evans, Peter Glynn, John Woods, Mike Smith, John Holmes, Gary Stephens, Jim Mills, Graham Liptrot, Charlie Stone, Brian Lockwood (c), Mick Adams, Steve Norton. Reserves –

==== Third Test ====
14 July 1979

Australia	28 – 2	Great Britain
Tries: Les Boyd; Graham Eadie; Ray Price; Rod Reddy; Goals: Michael Cronin (8/13)		Goals: George Fairbairn (1/1)

Sydney Cricket Ground, Sydney
Attendance: 16,844
Referee: Eddie Ward (Australia)
Player of the Match: Ray Price

Australia	Position	Great Britain
Graham Eadie	FB	George Fairbairn
Chris Anderson	WG	Eric Hughes
Steve Rogers	CE	John Joyner
Michael Cronin	CE	John Woods
Terry Fahey	WG	Steve Evans
Alan Thompson	FE/SO	David Topliss
Tom Raudonikis	HB/SH	Alan Redfearn
Craig Young	PR	George Nicholls (c)
George Peponis (c)	HK	David Ward
Rod Morris	PR	Len Casey
Rod Reddy	SR	Jeff Grayshon
Les Boyd	SR	Phil Hogan
Ray Price	LK/LF	Steve Norton
	Int.	John Holmes
	Int.	Mick Adams
Frank Stanton	Coach	Eric Ashton

=== New Zealand ===
17 July 1979

New Zealand Māori	13 – 15	Great Britain Lions
Tries: Toa Fepuleai (2), Dennis Williams; Goals: Nick Wright (2)	Report	Tries: David Barends, Mel James, Graham Liptrot; Goals: Mick Adams (3)

Okara Park, Whangārei
Attendance: 5,000
Referee: Kevin Steel

New Zealand Māori: Nick Wright, Toa Fepuleai, Tariana Wharekura, Dennis Williams, John Heremaia, Ray Harris, Dennis Key, Rick Muru, Murray Netzler (c), Pat Poasa, Warren Rangi, Ian Bell, Kevin Jenkinson. Reserves – , . Coach –

Great Britain: Keith Mumby, David Barends, Mike Smith, Peter Glynn, Roy Mathias, John Holmes, Gary Stephens, John Burke, Graham Liptrot, Mel James, Charlie Stone, Brian Lockwood (c), Mick Adams. Reserves –

==== First Test ====
21 July 1979

New Zealand	8 – 16	Great Britain
Tries: Fred Ah Kuoi; Dick Uluave; Goals: Warren Collicoat (1)		Tries: Steve Evans; George Fairbairn; Eric Hughes; Mike Smith; Goals: George Fairbairn (2)

Carlaw Park, Auckland
Attendance: 9,000
Referee: John Percival (New Zealand)

New Zealand	Position	Great Britain
Warren Collicoat	FB	George Fairbairn
Dick Uluave	WG	Steve Evans
James Leuluai	CE	John Joyner
Olsen Filipaina	CE	Mike Smith
Dane O'Hara	WG	Eric Hughes
Fred Ah Kuoi	FE/SO	John Holmes
Gordon Smith	HB/SH	Gary Stephens
Mark Broadhurst	PR	Len Casey
Howie Tamati	HK	David Ward
Dane Sorensen	PR	George Nicholls (c)
Graeme West (c)	SR	Phil Hogan
Kevin Tamati	SR	Jeff Grayshon
Tony Coll	LK/LF	Mick Adams
	Int.	Brian Lockwood
	Int.
Cecil Mountford	Coach	Eric Ashton

22 July 1979

Northern Districts	5 – 58	Great Britain Lions
Tries: Bill Kells; Goals: Steve Dunston (1)	Report	Tries: David Barends (3), Steve Evans (3), Mel James (2), Roy Mathias (2), John Woods (2), Peter Glynn, David Topliss; Goals: Keith Mumby (4); John Woods (4)

Davies Park, Huntly
Attendance: 2,000

Northern Districts: Michael Tahu, John Heremaia, Charles Morgan, George Samuels, Kevin Fisher (c), Bill Kells, Dave Barlow, Pat Poasa, Paul Ravlich, Paddy Mathews, Warren Rangi, Trevor Bayley, Steve Dunston. Reserves – Philip Hetet, Jack Tahuri. Coach –

Great Britain: Keith Mumby, David Barends, Steve Evans, Peter Glynn, Roy Mathias, David Topliss, Alan Redfearn, John Burke, Graham Liptrot, Mel James, Brian Lockwood (c), Charlie Stone, Steve Norton. Reserves – John Woods, David Watkinson

25 July 1979

Central Districts	5 – 14	Great Britain Lions
Tries: Brent Peri; Goals: Bill Rona (1)	Report	Tries: Eric Hughes, Roy Mathias, Mike Smith, Gary Stephens; Goals: Roy Mathias (1)

Pukekura Park, New Plymouth
Attendance: 900
Referee: Earle Pilcher

Central Districts: P. Truuts, P. Tippens, Paul Christensen, Gary Butler, Dick Uluave, Bill Rona, Jack Knuckey, Paul Te Ariki, Howie Tamati, Kerry White, Graeme West (c), N. Pekopo, Mike Butler. Reserves – J. Mitchell, Brent Peri. Coach –

Great Britain: George Fairbairn, Eric Hughes, John Joyner, Mike Smith, Roy Mathias, John Holmes, Gary Stephens, Mel James, David Ward, Charlie Stone, Jeff Grayshon, Steve Norton (c). Reserves – John Burke

29 July 1979

Wellington	3 – 39	Great Britain Lions
Tries: Mark Petersen	Report	Tries: David Barends; Len Casey, Steve Evans, John Joyner, Alan Redfearn, Mike Smith, John Woods; Goals: John Joyner (9)

Petone Recreation Ground, Lower Hutt
Attendance: 2,000
Referee: Des O'Sullivan

Wellington: Warren Collicoat, Alan Brooks, Tariana Wharekura, Arlan Taylor, Mark Petersen, Nolan Tupaea, Gary Campbell, Whetu Henry, Kevin Tamati (c), Steve Brewster, Whare Henry, Tamu Tua, John Whittaker. Reserves – Wayne Rutene, James Porter, Bruce Tatnell, Lawrence Tekahiki. Coach – Clarke Tarawati

Great Britain: Keith Mumby, David Barends, Steve Evans, Mike Smith, John Woods, David Topliss, Alan Redfearn, John Burke, Graham Liptrot, Trevor Skerrett, George Nicholls (c), Len Casey, Phil Hogan. Reserves – John Joyner, David Watkinson

1 August 1979

Canterbury	v	Great Britain Lions
	Report

Addington Showgrounds, Christchurch
Referee: Don Wilson

This match was cancelled due to flooding causing the Showgrounds to be under-water.

The Showgrounds would be clear for the Second Test 4 days later.

==== Second Test ====
5 August 1979

New Zealand	7 – 22	Great Britain
Tries: Olsen Filipaina; Goals: Olsen Filipaina (2)		Tries: Len Casey; Steve Evans; Jeff Grayshon; Eric Hughes; Goals: George Fairbairn (5)

Addington Showgrounds, Christchurch
Attendance: 8,500
Referee: John Percival (New Zealand)

New Zealand	Position	Great Britain
James Leuluai	FB	George Fairbairn
Dane O'Hara	WG	Steve Evans
Olsen Filipaina	CE	John Joyner
Lewis Hudson	CE	Mike Smith
Dick Uluave	WG	Eric Hughes
Fred Ah Kuoi	FE/SO	John Holmes
Gordon Smith	HB/SH	Gary Stephens
Mark Broadhurst	PR	George Nicholls (c)
Howie Tamati	HK	David Ward
Dane Sorensen	PR	Trevor Skerrett
Kevin Tamati	SR	Len Casey
Graeme West (c)	SR	Jeff Grayshon
Tony Coll	LK/LF	Mick Adams
	Int.
	Int.
Cecil Mountford	Coach	Eric Ashton

7 August 1979

West Coast	0 – 19	Great Britain Lions
Goals: Wayne Dwyer (0/1); Peter O'Neill (0/3)	Report	Tries: Phil Hogan (2), John Woods (2), Roy Mathias; Goals: John Woods (2)

Wingham Park, Greymouth
Attendance: 900
Referee: Peter McKenzie

West Coast: Peter O'Neill, Stephen Low, Mike McEwen, Bernard Green, Greg Mooney, Chris Menzies, Gordon Smith, Peter Harris, John Griffin, Wayne Dwyer, Tony Coll (c), Ray Baxendale, Michael Whitehead. Reserves – Alan Atkinson. Coach –

Great Britain: George Fairbairn, David Barends, Peter Glynn, John Woods, Roy Mathias, David Topliss, Alan Redfearn, John Burke, Graham Liptrot, Mel James, Charlie Stone, Brian Lockwood (c), Phil Hogan. Reserves –

==== Third Test ====
11 August 1979

New Zealand	18 – 11	Great Britain
Tries: Kevin Fisher; Mark Graham; James Leuluai; Dane O'Hara; Goals: Olsen Filipaina (3)		Tries: Eric Hughes; Mike Smith; Gary Stephens; Goals: George Fairbairn (1)

Carlaw Park, Auckland
Attendance: 7,000
Referee: Kevin Steel (New Zealand)

New Zealand	Position	Great Britain
James Leuluai	FB	George Fairbairn
Kevin Fisher	WG	Steve Evans
Olsen Filipaina	CE	John Joyner
Lewis Hudson	CE	Mike Smith
Dane O'Hara	WG	Eric Hughes
Fred Ah Kuoi (c)	FE/SO	John Holmes
Shane Varley	HB/SH	Gary Stephens
Mark Broadhurst	PR	Trevor Skerrett
Howie Tamati	HK	David Ward
Kevin Tamati	PR	George Nicholls (c)
Barry Edkins	SR	Len Casey
Tony Coll	SR	Jeff Grayshon
Mark Graham	LK/LF	Mick Adams
John Smith	Int.	John Woods
Paul Ravlich	Int.	Phil Hogan
Cecil Mountford	Coach	Eric Ashton

13 August 1979

Auckland	10 – 18	Great Britain Lions
Tries: Toa Fepuleai, Olsen Filipaina; Goals: Olsen Filipaina (2)	Report	Tries: David Barends, Peter Glynn, Brian Lockwood, David Topliss; Goals: John Woods (3)

Carlaw Park, Auckland
Attendance: 15,000
Referee: Bob Lynch

Auckland: Gary Kemble, Toa Fepuleai, Olsen Filipaina, Ken Anderson, James Leuluai, Fred Ah Kuoi (c), Shane Varley, Wayne Robertson, Murray Netzler, Doug Gailey, Owen Wright, Alan McCarthy, Gary Prohm. Reserves – John Smith, Ian Bell. Coach – Don Hammond

Great Britain: Keith Mumby, David Barends, John Woods, Peter Glynn, Roy Mathias, David Topliss, Alan Redfearn, John Burke, David Watkinson, Mel James, Brian Lockwood (c), Charlie Stone, Phil Hogan. Reserves –

== Statistics ==
Leading try scorer

- 16 by Steve Evans

Leading point scorer

- 48 by Steve Evans (16 tries)

Largest attendance

- 26,857 – Second test vs Australia at the Sydney Cricket Ground

Largest non-test attendance

- 15,000 – Auckland vs Great Britain at Carlaw Park
