= 1979 European Rugby League Championship =

1979 European Championship
- Number of teams: 3
- Winner: England (10th title)
- Matches played: 3

The 1979 European Rugby League Championship was a three-way tournament between the national rugby league football teams of England, France and Wales.

== Squads ==
=== France ===
- Guy Alard
- Jean-Marc Bourret
- Delphin Castanon
- Henri Daniel
- Jean-Marc Gonzalès
- Didier Hermet
- Guy Laforgue
- Christian Laumond
- Michel Maïque
- André Malacamp
- José Moya
- Michel Naudo
- Jean-Pierre Siré
- Alain Touchagues
- Francis Tranier
- Éric Waligunda
- Charles Zalduendo

=== England ===
- Michael Adams
- Barry Banks
- Harry Beverley
- Steve Evans
- Peter Glynn
- Jeff Grayshon
- Phil Hogan
- Eric Hughes
- Ken Kelly
- Graham Liptrot
- Brian Lockwood
- Thomas Martyn
- Keith Mumby
- Alan Redfearn
- Keith Smith
- Gary Stephens
- Eddie Szymala
- Keith Tindall
- David Watkinson
- John Woods
- Stuart Wright

=== Wales ===
- John Bevan
- Harold Box
- Tommy Cunningham
- Bill Francis
- Mel James
- Graeme Johns
- Brian Juliff
- Roy Mathias
- Jim Mills
- Mick Murphy
- Mike Nicholas
- Paul Prendiville
- John Risman
- Peter Rowe
- Trevor Skerrett
- Clive Sullivan
- David Watkins
- Paul Woods

== Venues ==
| (England) Warrington | (France) Narbonne | (England) Widnes |
|---|---|---|
| Wilderspool Stadium | Stade de l'Egassiarial, Narbonne | Naughton Park |
| Capacity: 9,200 | Capacity: 12,000 | Capacity: 13,000 |

== Results ==
4 February

| France | 15 – 8 | Wales |
| Tries:Jean-Marc Bourret; Jean-Marc Gonzalès; Francis Tranier; Goals: José Moya (2); Field Goals: Jean-Marc Bourret; Éric Waligunda | | Tries: Peter Rowe; Goals: David Watkins (2); Field Goals: David Watkins |

Stade de l'Egassiarial, Narbonne
Attendance: 13,726

16 March

| England | 15–7 | Wales |

Naughton Park, Widnes
Attendance: 5,099

24 March

| England | 12–6 | France |

Wilderspool Stadium, Warrington
Attendance: 5,004

== Final standings ==
| Team | Played | Won | Drew | Lost | For | Against | Diff | Points |
|---|---|---|---|---|---|---|---|---|
| England | 2 | 2 | 0 | 0 | 27 | 13 | +14 | 4 |
| France | 2 | 1 | 0 | 1 | 21 | 20 | +1 | 2 |
| Wales | 2 | 0 | 0 | 2 | 15 | 30 | −15 | 0 |

- England win the tournament with two victories.
