= 1975 Rugby League World Cup squads =

This is a list of the five national teams who played the 1975 Rugby League World Cup.

== Australia ==
1. Graeme Langlands (Captain/Coach)
2. Chris Anderson
3. Arthur Beetson
4. Ray Branighan
5. John Brass
6. Ron Coote
7. Mick Cronin
8. John Donnelly
9. Graham Eadie
10. Terry Fahey
11. Denis Fitzgerald
12. Bob Fulton
13. Mark Harris
14. Ray Higgs
15. John Lang
16. Ian Mackay
17. Allan McMahon
18. John Mayes
19. John O'Neill
20. John Peard
21. Tim Pickup
22. Greg Pierce
23. George Piggins
24. Lew Platz
25. Jim Porter
26. John Quayle
27. Terry Randall
28. Tommy Raudonikis
29. Johnny Rhodes
30. Steve Rogers
31. Paul Sait
32. Ian Schubert
33. Gary Stevens
34. Ross Strudwick
35. Greg Veivers
36. David Wright

== New Zealand ==
Coach: George Menzies

Player	Position	Age	Club	Games	Points
Ken Stirling (c)	Halfback	25	Auckland	7	6
Murray Eade (vc)	Loose forward	26	Auckland	6	3
Fred Ah Kuoi	Centre	18	Auckland	2	0
Kevin Barry	Scrum-half	25	Auckland	0	0
Ray Baxendale	Prop	20	West Coast	7	0
Les Beehre	Hooker	23	Auckland	0	0
Mocky Brereton	Wing	27	Canterbury	1	0
Tony Coll	Second-row	25	West Coast	8	3
Warren Collicoat	Fullback	24	Auckland	8	32
Tom Conroy	Hooker	24	Auckland	8	3
Bruce Dickison	Centre	22	Canterbury	8	3
Barrie Dyer	Second-row	23	Auckland	0	0
Tony Gordon	Fullback	26	Bay of Plenty	3	18
John Greengrass	Prop	27	Canterbury	6	3
Peter Gurnick	Loose forward	26	Auckland	3	0
John Hibbs	Second-row	31	West Coast	1	0
Bob Jarvis	Stand-off	25	Auckland	7	9
Josh Liavaa	Second-row	27	Auckland	0	0
Paul Matete	Centre	26	Auckland	1	0
Don Munro	Wing	23	Wellington	3	0
John O'Sullivan	Centre	24	Auckland	4	0
Kevin Potter	Centre	23	Auckland	0	0
Lyndsay Proctor	Prop	23	Auckland	6	3
John Smith	Centre	20	Auckland	4	3
Dane Sorensen	Prop	19	Auckland	5	20
Kurt Sorensen	Second-row	18	Auckland	3	0
Graeme West	Second-row	21	Taranaki	1	0
John Whittaker	Fullback	24	Wellington	3	3
Dennis Williams	Five-eighth	21	Auckland	8	6
John Wright	Prop	21	Auckland	0	0
Murray Wright	Hooker	22	Auckland	0	0

== France ==
Coach:Antoine Jimenez

1. Yves Alvernhe (Albi)
2. Michel Anglade (Saint-Gaudens)
3. Elie Bonal (Carcassonne)
4. Jean-Marie Bosc (Saint-Estève)
5. Guy Bucchi (Marseille)
6. José Calle (Saint-Estève)
7. Michel Cassin (Tonneins)
8. Jean-Louis Castel (Carcassonne)
9. Patrick Chauvet (Bordeaux)
10. Philippe Clergeau (Bordeaux)
11. Bernard Curt (Toulouse)
12. Maurice de Matos (Toulouse)
13. Francis de Nadaï (Limoux)
14. André Dumas (Lézignan)
15. Francis Duthill (Bordeaux)
16. Guy Garcia (Carcassonne)
17. Serge Gleyzes (Carcassonne)
18. Antoine Gonzalez (Villeneuve-sur-Lot)
19. Michel Gonzalez (Pamiers)
20. Jean-Francois Grechi (Limoux)
21. Bernard Guilhem (Carcassonne)
22. Didier Hermet (Villeneuve-sur-Lot)
23. Jean-Marie Imbert (Avignon)
24. Fernand Kaminski (Albi)
25. Jean-Pierre Lacoste (Bordeaux)
26. Michel Laffargue (Tonneins)
27. Michel Maïque (Lézignan)
28. Jean-Claude Mayorgas (Toulouse)
29. Michel Molinier (Saint-Gaudens)
30. Michel Moussard (Albi)
31. Marcel Pillon (Saint-Estève)
32. André Ruiz (Pau)
33. Jean-Paul Sauret (XIII Catalan)
34. Victor Serrano (Saint-Gaudens)
35. René Terrats (Saint-Estève)
36. Charles Thénégal (Toulouse)
37. Francis Tranier (Saint-Gaudens)
38. Jean-Pierre Tremouille (Tonneins)
39. Guy Vigouroux (Cavaillon)
40. Charles Zalduendo (Toulouse)

== England ==
Coaches: William "Bill" Oxley Coach Alex Murphy

1. Roger Millward (c)
2. Michael "Mick" Adams
3. John Atkinson
4. Harry Beverley
5. John Keith Bridges
6. Paul Charlton
7. David "Dave" Chisnall
8. Eric Chisnall
9. Philip "Phil" Cookson
10. Michael "Mike" Coulman
11. Ged Dunn
12. Ray Dutton
13. Leslie "Les" Dyl
14. David "Dave" Eckersley
15. George Fairbairn
16. Stanley "Stan" Fearnley
17. Keith Fielding
18. Colin Forsyth
19. Ken Gill
20. Parry Gordon
21. John Gray
22. Jeff Grayshon
23. Brian Hogan
24. John Holmes
25. Eric Hughes
26. Bob Irving
27. Phil Jackson
28. Thomas "Tommy" Martyn
29. Mick Morgan
30. Steve Nash
31. George Nicholls
32. Derek Noonan
33. Steve 'Knocker' Norton
34. Barry Philbin
35. David "Dave" Redfearn
36. Alan Smith
37. Nigel Stephenson
38. James "Jimmy" Thompson
39. John Walsh
40. Stuart Wright

== Wales ==
Coaches: R. Simpson and Les Pearce

1. David Watkins (c)
2. Peter Banner
3. John Bevan
4. Brian Butler
5. Kel Coslett
6. Eddie Cunningham
7. Colin Dixon
8. Dick Evans
9. Tony Fisher
10. Bill Francis
11. Stuart Gallacher
12. Brian Gregory
13. Mel James
14. Clive Jones
15. John Mantle
16. Roy Mathias
17. 'Big' Jim Mills
18. Mick Murphy
19. Mike Nicholas
20. Maurice Richards
21. Peter Rowe
22. Clive Sullivan
23. David Treasure
24. Glyn Turner
25. Richard Wallace
26. Bobby Wanbon
27. David Willicombe
28. Frank Wilson
