= 1978–79 Rugby League Premiership =

1978–79 Premiership
- Structure: National knockout championship
- Winners: Leeds
- Runners-up: Bradford Northern

The 1978–79 Rugby League Premiership was the fifth end of season Rugby League Premiership competition.

The winners were Leeds.

== First round ==
Date	Team one	Team two	Score
15 May	Hull Kingston Rovers	Bradford Northern	17-18
15 May	Leeds	St Helens	21-10
15 May	Warrington	Castleford	17-10
15 May	Widnes	Wigan	8-12

== Semi-finals ==
Date	Team one	Team two	Score
19 May	Warrington	Bradford Northern	11-14
20 May	Leeds	Wigan	20-10

== Final ==
27 May 1979

Leeds	24-2	Bradford Northern
T-Smith A, Smith D, Ward; G-Dick (7) DG-Dick		G-Ferres

Fartown Ground, Huddersfield
Attendance: 19,486

1	Neil Hague
2	Alan Smith
3	David Smith
4	Les Dyl
5	John Atkinson
6	Kevin Dick
7	John Sanderson
8	Mick Harrison
9	David Ward
10	Steve Pitchford
11	Graham Joyce
12	Graham Eccles
13	Phil Cookson
Substitutions:
14	Paul Fletcher for Les Dyl
15	Bryan Adams for Graham Eccles
Coach:
Syd Hynes

1	Keith Mumby
2	Derek Parker
3	Eddie Okulicz
4	Les Gant
5	Alan Spencer
6	Steve Ferres
7	Alan Redfearn
8	Jimmy Thompson
9	John Keith Bridges
10	Colin Forsyth
11	Dennis Trotter
12	Jeff Grayshon
13	Len Casey
Substitutions:
14	Ian Van Bellen for Colin Forsyth
15	David Mordue for Dennis Trotter
Coach:
Peter Fox
