= John Burke (rugby league, born 1948) =

GB international rugby league footballer

Personal information
- Full name: John Burke
- Born: 10 January 1948; Wakefield, England
- Died: 9 June 2013 (aged 65); Wakefield, England

Playing information
- Position: Prop
Club
Years	Team	Pld	T	G	FG	P
1964–72	Leeds
1972–76	Keighley	103	8	0	1	25
1976	South Sydney	10	0	0	0	0
1976–78	Castleford	12	2	0	0	6
1978–79	Wakefield Trinity	24	1	0	0	3
	Total	149	11	0	1	34
Representative
Years	Team	Pld	T	G	FG	P
1979	Great Britain	9	0	0	0	0

John Burke (10 January 1948 – 9 June 2013) was an English professional rugby league footballer who played in the 1960s and 1970s. He played at representative level for Great Britain (non-Test matches), and at club level for Normanton, Leeds, Keighley, South Sydney Rabbitohs, Castleford and Wakefield Trinity, as a prop.

== Background ==
John Burke was born in Wakefield, West Riding of Yorkshire, England. He worked as a plumber, and he died aged 65 in Wakefield, West Yorkshire, England.

== Playing career ==
=== Leeds ===
John was a Normanton boy and his career took him to Leeds, Keighley, South Sydney and Castleford before arriving at Belle Vue in 1978. His Leeds career started in 1964 but he did not break into the first team until 1967 and then more regularly in 1969–70 after the retirement of Mick Clark. In his first full season he won a League Leaders' winners medal and a Yorkshire League winners medal and was in Leeds' front row when they went down to St Helens in the 1970 Championship Final. The following 1970–71 season saw John play in another three cup finals (including Leeds 23–7 victory over Featherstone Rovers in the 1970 Yorkshire Cup Final, and Leeds' 9–5 victory over St Helens in the 1970 BBC2 Floodlit Trophy Final) and also saw him play at Wembley, playing at prop in Leeds' 7–24 defeat by Leigh in the 1971 Challenge Cup Final on Saturday 15 May 1971, in front of a crowd of 85,514.

=== Keighley and Castleford ===
In 1972 he moved to Keighley, making his début in an 11–16 home defeat by Hull KR on 1 September. He played a total of 103 games for Keighley between 1972 and 1976 which saw him score eight tries and a drop goal (a left foot effort at York in a 1975 Yorkshire Cup tie). His time at Lawkholme Lane also saw him close to Wembley again, with a 1976 semi-final defeat (4-5 v St Helens).

After a brief retirement he arrived at Castleford in 1976. His notorious reputation caught up with him here with numerous suspensions. In-between Keighley and Castleford, he also had the 1976 season with the South Sydney Rabbitohs where he played ten first-team games.

=== Wakefield Trinity ===
When John signed for Wakefield Trinity in April 1978, he was suspended almost immediately. He had been out of the game six months after a Castleford sending-off. On his return game in the Trinity Reserves, he was sent off again so a two-game ban saw him miss his first two Trinity games, at St Helens and at home to Hull. He made his Trinity début at Hull KR on 9 April 1978 and he was sent off again, along with Bill Ashurst in a narrow 16–17 defeat. The suspension forced him to miss the first three games of 1978–79 but from that time on he was the cornerstone of the Trinity pack that saw them go all the way to Wembley. He was a first class ball handler, strong runner and tremendous tackler and went on to play twenty one games in the season, scoring his only Trinity try at Huddersfield in October 1978. He played in all the cup rounds, Featherstone (home), Oldham (away) and Barrow (home) before having one of his best ever games in the semi-final victory over St Helens, when he had a hand in the match winning try, scored by Andrew Fletcher in the 9–7 win. There then followed John's second visit to Wembley but also his second defeat when he played at prop in Wakefield Trinity's 3–12 defeat by Widnes in the 1979 Challenge Cup Final on Saturday 5 May 1979, in front of a crowd of a crowd of 94,218. He came second in the press vote for the Lance Todd Trophy behind David Topliss.

His successful season earned him the Trinity Supporters' Player of the Year for 1978–79, followed by a late call up to the Great Britain tour squad. The Lions were already 'Down Under' when John earned his call-up following injuries and although did not feature in the Test line up he played in nine tour games before throwing his boots into Auckland Harbour and never playing again. He waited until returning home in August 1979 before officially announcing his shock retirement but his powerful runs, strong defence and deft handling skills were to be lost to the club. He played a total of twenty four first team games, scoring one try. In his retirement he became an accomplished runner and he could be seen running many half marathons around the city. He was also a successful plumber and resided in Durkar before his illness.

=== International honours ===
John Burke was selected for Great Britain while at Wakefield Trinity for the 1979 Great Britain Lions tour of Australia and New Zealand. He played nine times for the GB team whilst on tour in 1979, but no test matches
