= Kevin Potter =

Kevin Potter may refer to:

- Kevin Potter (rugby league)
- Kevin Potter (American football)
