= 1979 European Championship =

1979 European Championship can refer to European Championships held in several sports:

- 1979 European Rugby League Championship
- EuroBasket 1979
