= Trevor Midgley =

English rugby league footballer

Personal information
- Full name: Trevor Midgley
- Born: first ¼ 1957 (age 67–68); Wakefield district, England

Playing information
- Position: Fullback, Centre
Club
Years	Team	Pld	T	G	FG	P
≤1979–≥79	Wakefield Trinity

Trevor Midgley (birth registered first ¼ 1957) is an English former professional rugby league footballer who played in the 1970s. He played at club level for Wakefield Trinity, as a fullback, or centre.

== Background ==
Trevor Midgley's birth was registered in Wakefield district, West Riding of Yorkshire, England.

== Playing career ==
=== Challenge Cup Final appearances ===
Trevor Midgley was an unused substitute in Wakefield Trinity's 3-12 defeat by Widnes in the 1979 Challenge Cup Final during the 1978–79 season at Wembley Stadium, London on Saturday 5 May 1979, in front of a crowd of a crowd of 94,218.
