= Graham Liptrot =

England international rugby league footballer

Personal information
- Full name: Joseph Graham Liptrot
- Born: 8 July 1955 (age 70) St Helens, Merseyside, England

Playing information
- Position: Hooker
Club
Years	Team	Pld	T	G	FG	P
1973–88	St. Helens	387	32	0	0	104
Representative
Years	Team	Pld	T	G	FG	P
1979	England	2	0	0	0	0
	Lancashire	3

Graham Liptrot (born 8 July 1955), also known by the nickname of "Lippy", is an English former professional rugby league footballer who played in the 1970s and 1980s. He played at representative level for England, and at club level for St. Helens, as a hooker.

== Playing career ==
=== Club career ===
Liptrot made his debut for St Helens in 1973. During his early career, he served as an understudy to Saints' first-choice hooker, Tony Karalius. He became a regular starter for the first team during the 1976–77 season.

Liptrot played hooker in St. Helens' 11–26 defeat by Hull Kingston Rovers in the 1977 BBC2 Floodlit Trophy Final during the 1977–78 season at Craven Park, Kingston upon Hull on Tuesday 13 December 1977, and played hooker in the 7–13 defeat by Widnes in the 1978 BBC2 Floodlit Trophy Final during the 1978–79 season at Knowsley Road, St. Helens on Tuesday 12 December 1978.

Graham Liptrot played hooker in St. Helens 0–16 defeat by Warrington in the 1982 Lancashire Cup Final during the 1982–83 season at Central Park, Wigan on Saturday 23 October 1982, and played hooker in the 28–16 victory over Wigan in the 1984 Lancashire Cup Final during the 1984–85 season at Central Park, Wigan on Sunday 28 October 1984.

Graham Liptrot's testimonial match for St. Helens took place against Mansfield Marksman at Knowsley Road, St Helens, Merseyside on Sunday 19 August 1984.

Graham Liptrot played hooker in St. Helens' 18–19 defeat by Halifax in the 1987 Challenge Cup Final during the 1986–87 season at Wembley Stadium, London on Saturday 2 May 1987.

=== International honours ===
Liptrot won caps for England while at St. Helens in 1979 against Wales, and France. He was also selected for the 1979 Great Britain Lions tour, but did not play in any of the Test matches.
