= Greg Platz =

Australian rugby league footballer

Personal information
- Full name: Greg Platz
- Born: 29 September 1950 (age 75)

Playing information
- Position: Second-row
Club
Years	Team	Pld	T	G	FG	P
	Wattles (Toowoomba)	0	0	0	0	0
	Wynnum Manly Seagulls	0	0	0	0	0
	Total	0	0	0	0	0
Representative
Years	Team	Pld	T	G	FG	P
19??–??	Toowoomba
1976–78	Queensland	10	2	0	0	6
1978	Australia	1	0	0	0	0
- As of 12 July 2021
- Relatives: Lew Platz (brother)

Greg Platz is an Australian former professional rugby league footballer who played in the 1970s. A Queensland and Australian international representative back row forward, he played club football for his local club, Allora Clifton Wattles. He played rep football for Toowoomba and for Qld Country. He is the brother of fellow Kangaroo Lew Platz. During the 1974 Great Britain Lions tour Platz was elected to play for Toowoomba against the visiting side. In 1977 he captain-coached Wattles. He captained the Toowoomba Clydesdales in the late '70s. He played a lone international against New Zealand in Brisbane in 1978. During the 1979 Great Britain Lions tour Platz was selected to play for Queensland and Toowoomba against the visiting side.

He later coached the Toowoomba Clydesdales in the 1980s.
