= Mike Fish =

Australian rugby league footballer

Personal information
- Full name: Michael William Fish
- Born: 28 May 1954 (age 70); Canley Vale, New South Wales, Australia

Playing information
- Position: Wing, Centre, Fullback
Club
Years	Team	Pld	T	G	FG	P
1974–78	Balmain Tigers	90	30	4	0	98

Mike Fish (born 28 May 1954) is an Australian former rugby league footballer who played in the 1970s.

He played his entire career at the Balmain Tigers, playing mostly on the wing, but played the occasional game at centre or fullback.

== Playing career ==
Fish was graded by the Balmain Tigers in 1974. He made his first grade debut in his side's 21−14 loss to the Cronulla Sharks at Leichhardt Oval in round 18 of the 1974 season. In his first few seasons at Balmain, the club struggled on the field and claimed the wooden spoon in 1974 after coming last. In 1976, Balmain narrowly missed out on finals qualification finishing the season in 6th position. Fish finished the season as the club's top try scorer with 10 tries.

In 1977, Balmain reached the finals series for the first time since their premiership win in 1969 after finishing the season in 4th position. Balmain would reach the semi-final but were defeated by the Eastern Suburbs Roosters 26–2 at the Sydney Cricket Ground. Fish also finished the 1977 season as the team's top try scorer with 13 tries. Fish was released by the Tigers at the end of the 1978 season, and subsequently never played first grade rugby league again, though he would represent Illawarra Firsts against the touring Great Britain Lions in 1979.

In total, Fish played 90 games, scored 30 tries, and kicked 4 goals.
