= David Watkinson =

Former Great Britain and England international rugby league footballer (born 1954)

Personal information
- Full name: David Watkinson
- Born: 19 November 1954 (age 71) York, England

Playing information
- Position: Hooker
Club
Years	Team	Pld	T	G	FG	P
1977–89	Hull Kingston Rovers	329	13	0	3	48
1989–91	Dewsbury	32	1	0	0	4
	Total	361	14	0	3	52
Representative
Years	Team	Pld	T	G	FG	P
1980–85	Yorkshire	2	0	0	0	0
1979	England	1	0	0	0	0
1979–86	Great Britain	13	1	0	0	4

David Watkinson (born 19 November 1954) is an English former professional rugby league footballer who played in the 1970s and 1980s. He played at representative level for Great Britain, England and Yorkshire, and at club level for Heworth, Hull Kingston Rovers and Dewsbury as a hooker.

== Playing career ==
=== Hull Kingston Rovers ===
Born in York, Watkinson began playing rugby league at amateur club Heworth. He was signed by Hull Kingston Rovers in 1976, following a successful trial. He made his first team debut in a 25–9 win against Leeds in January 1977.

Watkinson played hooker in Hull Kingston Rovers' 26–11 victory over St. Helens in the 1977 BBC2 Floodlit Trophy Final during the 1977-78 season at Craven Park, Hull on Tuesday 13 December 1977.

Watkinson won his first league championship with the club in the 1978–79 season.

Watkinson played hooker in Hull Kingston Rovers' 10–5 victory over Hull F.C. in the 1979–80 Challenge Cup Final during the 1979–80 season at Wembley Stadium, London on Saturday 3 May 1980, in front of a crowd of 95,000.

He played hooker in the 9–18 defeat by Widnes in the 1980–81 Challenge Cup Final during the 1980–81 season at Wembley Stadium, London on Saturday 2 May 1981, in front of a crowd of 92,496.

Watkinson played hooker in Hull Kingston Rovers' 4–12 defeat by Hull F.C. in the 1981–82 John Player Trophy Final during the 1981–82 season at Headingley, Leeds on Saturday 23 January 1982.

Watkinson was sent off playing for Hull Kingston Rovers against the 1982 Australian Tourists in October 1982.

In the 1983–84 Rugby Football League season, Watkinson won his second league championship with the club, and played in the famous 8-6 victory over Queensland as they toured Papua New Guinea and England in October 1983, but missed out on the second half of the season due an injury sustained while playing for Great Britain.

In the 1984–85 season, Watkinson won his third league championship with the club (this time as captain). He also played hooker in Hull Kingston Rovers' 12–29 defeat by Hull F.C. in the 1984–85 Yorkshire Cup Final at Boothferry Park, Kingston upon Hull, on Saturday 27 October 1984, and played hooker and captained Hull Kingston Rovers in their 12–0 victory over Hull F.C. in the 1984–85 John Player Special Trophy Final at Boothferry Park, Kingston upon Hull on Saturday 26 January 1985.

During the 1985-86 season, Watkinson played hooker and captained Hull Kingston Rovers in the 22–18 victory over Castleford in the 1985–86 Yorkshire Cup Final at Headingley, Leeds, on Sunday 27 October 1985, and played hooker and was captain in the 14–15 defeat by Castleford in the 1985-86 Challenge Cup Final at Wembley Stadium, London, on Saturday 3 May 1986, in front of a crowd of 82,134. He also played hooker and captained Hull Kingston Rovers in the 8–11 defeat by Wigan in the 1985–86 John Player Special Trophy Final during the 1985–86 season at Elland Road, Leeds on Saturday 11 January 1986.

David Watkinson's Testimonial match at Hull Kingston Rovers took place in 1988.

He made his final appearance for Hull Kingston Rovers in March 1989 in a 2–26 defeat against Hull.

=== Later career ===
In September 1989, Watkinson joined Dewsbury on a free transfer, where he finished his career.

=== Representative honours ===
Watkinson played twice for Yorkshire. He debuted in September 1980 against Lancashire, and also played against Lancashire in their 26–10 victory in the 1985 War Of The Roses fixture.

Watkinson won one cap for England while at Hull Kingston Rovers in 1979, appearing as a substitute against Wales in the 1979 European Championship.

Watkinson was selected by Great Britain for the 1979 Lions tour, and won his first cap against Australia in the second Ashes Test. In January 1984, he suffered a broken leg while playing for Great Britain against France, ruling him out of selection for the Lions tour later that year. He was capped 13 times for Great Britain between 1979 and 1986, scoring his only try for the team in a 50–4 win against France in March 1985. Watkinson was appointed Great Britain captain for the 1986 Ashes Series v Australia

== Honours ==
- Championship: 1978–79, 1983–84, 1984–85
- Challenge Cup: 1979–80
- John Player Special Trophy: 1984–85
- Premiership: 1980–81
- Yorkshire Cup: 1985–86
- BBC2 Floodlit Trophy: 1977–78
