= 1979 Challenge Cup =

1979 Challenge Cup may refer to:

- 1979 Challenge Cup (ice hockey), a series of international ice hockey games between the Soviet Union national ice hockey team and a team of All-Stars from the National Hockey League.
- 1978–79 Challenge Cup, the 78th staging of the Northern Rugby Football League's knockout competition.
- 1979–80 Challenge Cup, the 79th staging of the Northern Rugby Football League's knockout competition.
