= Len Casey =

GB & England international rugby league player & coach (born 1950)

Personal information
- Full name: Leonard Casey
- Born: 28 January 1950 (age 76) Hull, England

Playing information
- Position: Prop, Second-row, Loose forward
Club
Years	Team	Pld	T	G	FG	P
1970–75	Hull FC	89+13	13	0	0	39
1975–78	Hull Kingston Rovers	110	9	0	1	28
1978–80	Bradford Northern	37	4	0	0	12
1980–85	Hull Kingston Rovers	108+9	8	0	0	28
1985	Wakefield Trinity	9	1	0	0	4
	Total	375	35	0	1	111
Representative
Years	Team	Pld	T	G	FG	P
1978–81	England	5	1	0	0	3
1977–83	Great Britain	12+2	1	0	0	3
1978–82	Yorkshire	2	1	0	0	3

Coaching information
Club
Years	Team	Gms	W	D	L	W%
1985–86	Wakefield Trinity
1986–88	Hull FC
1991–92	Scarborough Pirates
	Total	0	0	0	0

Leonard Casey (born 28 January 1950), also known by the nickname of "Cast Iron Casey", is an English former professional rugby league footballer who played in the 1960s, 1970s and 1980s, and coached in the 1980s and 1990s. He played at representative level for Great Britain and England, and at club level for Hull Kingston Rovers (two spells), Bradford Northern, Hull F.C. and Wakefield Trinity, as a prop, second-row or loose forward, and coached at club level for Wakefield Trinity, Hull FC, Beverley A.R.L.F.C. and the Scarborough Pirates.

== Background ==
Casey was born in Kingston upon Hull, East Riding of Yorkshire. He ran the May Cottage bed and breakfast in Bowness-on-Windermere until c. 2017.

== Playing career ==
=== Hull ===
Casey started his professional career with Hull joining the club from Beverley Juniors in 1970.

=== Hull Kingston Rovers ===
In September 1975, Casey was signed by Hull Kingston Rovers for a fee of £6,000.

Casey played loose forward in Hull Kingston Rovers' 26–11 victory over St. Helens in the 1977 BBC2 Floodlit Trophy Final during the 1977–78 season at Craven Park, Hull on Tuesday 13 December 1977.

Casey won the Championship in the 1978-79 season as part of Hull Kingston Rovers squad.

=== Bradford Northern ===
In December 1978, Casey was sold to Bradford Northern in exchange for Paul Harkin.

Casey played loose forward in Bradford Northern' 24–2 defeat by Leeds in the 1978–79 Premiership Final during the 1978–79 season at Fartown Ground, Huddersfield on Saturday 27 May 1979.

Casey played loose forward in Bradford Northern's 6–0 victory over Widnes in the 1979–80 John Player Trophy Final during the 1979–80 season at Headingley, Leeds on Saturday 5 January 1980, Casey was awarded the man of the match.

Casey won the Championship in the 1979-80 season as part of the Bradford Northern squad.

=== Return to Hull KR ===
In January 1980, Casey was re-signed by Hull Kingston Rovers for a record transfer fee of £38,000.

Casey played loose forward in Hull Kingston Rovers' 10–5 victory over Hull F.C. in the 1979–80 Challenge Cup Final during the 1979–80 season at Wembley Stadium, London on Saturday 3 May 1980, in front of a crowd of 95,000.

During the 1980–81 season, Casey played second-row and was captain in Hull Kingston Rovers' 7–8 defeat by Leeds in the 1980–81 Yorkshire Cup Final at Fartown Ground, Huddersfield on Saturday 8 November 1980, played loose forward, and was captain in the 9–18 defeat by Widnes in the 1980–81 Challenge Cup Final at Wembley Stadium, London on Saturday 2 May 1981, and played second-row and was captain and man of the match, winning the Harry Sunderland Trophy, in Hull Kingston Rovers' 11–7 victory over Hull F.C. in the 1980–81 Premiership Final at Headingley, Leeds on Saturday 16 May 1981.

He played second-row in Hull Kingston Rovers' 4–12 defeat by Hull F.C. in the 1981–82 John Player Trophy Final during the 1981–82 season at Headingley, Leeds on Saturday 23 January 1982.

Casey was captain of Hull Kingston Rovers squad that won the 1983-84 season Championship, but his season was soured by incidents towards of the end of the season. He was sent off twice in matches during April 1984, and was banned for six months for pushing a touch judge after his dismissal against Hull. The suspension also cost him a place on the 1984 Great Britain Lions tour.

Casey was a non-playing substitute in Hull Kingston Rovers' 12–0 victory over Hull F.C. in the 1984–85 John Player Trophy Final during the 1984–85 season at Boothferry Park, Hull on Saturday 26 January 1985. He made his final appearance for the club in February 1985 in a league game against Halifax.

=== Representative honours ===
Casey won caps for England while at Hull Kingston Rovers in 1978 against France, and Wales, in 1980 against Wales, in 1981 against France, and Wales, and won caps for Great Britain while at Hull Kingston Rovers in the 1977 Rugby League World Cup against France (sub), New Zealand (sub), and Australia, in 1978 against Australia, while at Bradford Northern in 1979 against Australia (2 matches), and New Zealand (3 matches), while at Hull Kingston Rovers in 1980 against New Zealand (3 matches, 1 as captain), in 1983 against France (2 matches, both as captain).

Len Casey also represented Yorkshire against Cumbria in 1978 & 1982.

== Coaching career ==
Len Casey was the coach of Hull F.C. from 1986 to 1988. He was the coach in Hull FC's 24–31 defeat by Castleford in the 1986–87 Yorkshire Cup Final during the 1986–87 season at Fartown Ground, Huddersfield on Saturday 11 October 1986.

== Honours ==
Club

- Rugby League Championship Winner - 1978/79, 1979/80, 1983/84
- Rugby League Challenge Cup Winner - 1979/80
- John Player Trophy Winner - 1979/80, 1984/85
- Rugby League Premiership Winner - 1980/81
- BBC2 Floodlit Trophy Trophy Winner - 1977/78

Individual

- John Player Trophy Man of The Match 1979/80
- Harry Sunderland Trophy Winner - 1980/81
