= David Barends =

GB international rugby league footballer

Personal information
- Born: 1949 (age 75–76); Western Cape, South Africa

Playing information
- Position: Wing
Club
Years	Team	Pld	T	G	FG	P
1970–73	Wakefield Trinity	65+1	22	0	0	22
1973–77	York	125	68	0	0	204
1977–83	Bradford Northern	202	70	0	0	210
1983–84	Featherstone Rovers	24+1	6	0	0	24
1984	Batley	1+1	1	0	0	4
	Total	420	167	0	0	464
Representative
Years	Team	Pld	T	G	FG	P
1974–75	Other Nationalities	5	4	0	0	12
1979	Great Britain	2	0	0	0	0

David Barends (birth unknown) is a Great Britain international rugby league footballer who played in the 1970s and 1980s. He played at international level for Other Nationalities, and at club level for Wakefield Trinity, Bradford Northern, York and Featherstone Rovers, as a wing.

== Playing career ==
=== International honours ===
Barends won two caps for Great Britain while at Bradford Northern, being selected on the 1979 Great Britain Lions tour of Australia and New Zealand. Both of Barends caps were against Australia, and is the only South African-born player to have represented Great Britain. He also represented the Other Nationalities team while at Bradford Northern and York.

=== Premiership Final appearances ===
Barends played in Bradford Northern’s 17–8 victory over Widnes in the Premiership Final during the 1977–78 season at Station Road, Swinton on Saturday 20 May 1978.

=== County Cup Final appearances ===
Barends played on the wing in Bradford Northern's 18–8 victory over York in the 1978–79 Yorkshire Cup Final during the 1978–79 season at Headingley, Leeds on Saturday 28 October 1978, played on the wing, in the 5–10 defeat by Castleford in the 1981–82 Yorkshire Cup Final during the 1981–82 season at Headingley, Leeds on Saturday 3 October 1981, and played on the wing, in the 7–18 defeat by Hull F.C. in the 1982–83 Yorkshire Cup Final during the 1981–82 season at Elland Road, Leeds on Saturday 2 October 1982.

=== John Player Trophy Final appearances ===
Barends played on the wing in Bradford Northern's 6–0 victory over Widnes in the 1979–80 John Player Trophy Final during the 1979–80 season at Headingley, Leeds on Saturday 5 January 1980.

=== Club career ===
Barends was recommended to Wakefield Trinity by the former Wakefield Trinity player from South Africa, Ivor Dorrington, and joined in 1970 for a signing-on fee of £1,000 (based on increases in average earnings, this would be approximately £24,2800 in 2016), he scored 2-tries on his début against Blackpool Borough at Belle Vue, Wakefield.

== Personal life ==
As of 2015, Barends lives in South Elmsall in West Yorkshire, England.
