= Brian Juliff =

Former Wales international rugby league footballer and coach

Personal information
- Full name: Brian James Juliff
- Born: 5 December 1952 (age 72); Mountain Ash, Wales

Playing information
- Height: 6 ft 0 in (1.83 m)

Rugby union
- Position: Wing, Centre
Club
Years	Team	Pld	T	G	FG	P
1970–71	Mountain Ash RFC	32	20	0	0	80
1971–78	Pontypridd RFC		101			303
1976	Newport RFC		1			4
	Total	32	122	0	0	387

Rugby league
- Position: Wing, Second-row, Loose forward
Club
Years	Team	Pld	T	G	FG	P
1978	Widnes	1	1	0	0	3
1978–82	Wakefield Trinity	120	49	0	0	147
1982–85	Wigan	68	12	0	0	38
1985–88	Halifax	66	12	0	0	48
1988	Castleford	11	3	0	0	12
	Total	266	77	0	0	248
Representative
Years	Team	Pld	T	G	FG	P
1979–84	Wales	8	1	0	0	3

Coaching information
Club
Years	Team	Gms	W	D	L	W%
1991	Rochdale Hornets	1	0	0	1	0

Brian "Mad Dog" Juliff (born 5 December 1952) is a Welsh former rugby union and professional rugby league footballer who played in the 1970s and 1980s. He played representative level rugby union (RU) for Wales 'B', Wales President's XV, East Wales, Glamorgan County RFC, at invitational level for Crawshays RFC, and at club level Mountain Ash RFC, Newport RFC and Pontypridd RFC, as a wing, or centre, and representative rugby league (RL) for Wales, and at club level for Widnes (as A. N. Other), Wakefield Trinity, Wigan, Halifax and Castleford, as a wing, second-row, or loose forward. In June 2012 Juliff was appointed as the chairman of Wales Rugby League.

== Background ==
Brian Juliff was born in Mountain Ash, Wales.

== Rugby union ==
Brian Juliff played representative rugby union for Wales 'B', Wales President's XV, East Wales against Argentina scoring 1-try, and against Japan scoring 3-tries, Glamorgan County RFC and Crawshays RFC.

== Rugby league ==
=== Wakefield Trinity ===
In early 1978, Juliff had trials with Widnes, and scored a try in a match against Wigan, but turned down an offer to join the club permanently. A few months later, he signed for Wakefield Trinity for an undisclosed fee. Brian Juliff played on the wing in Wakefield Trinity's 3–12 defeat by Widnes in the 1978–79 Challenge Cup Final during the 1978–79 season at Wembley Stadium, London, on Saturday 5 May 1979, in front of a crowd of a crowd of 94,218.

=== Wigan ===
Juliff was signed by Wigan from Wakefield Trinity for £25,000 in 1982 (based on increases in average earnings, this would be approximately £110,200 in 2013).

Juliff appeared as a substitute (replacing Henderson Gill on 61-minutes) and scored a try in Wigan's 15–4 victory over Leeds in the 1982–83 John Player Trophy Final during the 1982–83 season at Elland Road, Leeds on Saturday 22 January 1983.

After breaking an arm playing for Wales in 1984, Brian returned to play in the Challenge Cup semi-final for Wigan against Hull Kingston Rovers, scoring a crucial try from the right wing. He played as a second-half substitute in Wigan's 6–19 defeat by Widnes in the 1983–84 Challenge Cup Final during the 1983–84 season at Wembley Stadium, London on Saturday 5 May 1984.

=== Halifax ===
Juliff was signed by Halifax from Wigan for £6,000 in September 1985 (based on increases in average earnings, this would be approximately £24,720 in 2014), he played in Halifax's victory in the Championship during the 1985–86 season, finishing one point ahead of Wigan. He played in 23-games in all competitions that season, scoring four tries.

He played as a second-half substitute (replacing Stand-off Chris Anderson) in Halifax's 19–18 victory over St. Helens in the 1986–87 Challenge Cup Final during the 1986–87 season at Wembley Stadium, London on Saturday 2 May 1987.

Juliff was the second player ever (and only Welshman) to represent 3 different teams (Wakefield Trinity, Wigan and Halifax) in the Challenge Cup Final at Wembley.

Juliff was loaned out to Castleford during the 1987–88 season.

=== International honours ===
Brian Juliff won caps for Wales (RL) while at Wakefield Trinity in 1979 against France, and England, in 1980 against France, and England, in 1981 against France, and England, and while at Wigan in 1982 against Australia, and in 1984 against England (playing for 30 minutes with a broken arm).

== Honours ==
Wigan

- Rugby League John Player Trophy Winner: 1983

Halifax

- Rugby League Championship Winner: 1986
- Rugby League Challenge Cup Winner: 1987

== Coaching ==
Brian was acting head coach in the 42-0 away defeat to Castleford in Jan 1991, stepping up from assistant coach to Allan Agar.
