= Michel Maïque =

French politician and rugby league footballer (1948–2021)

Mayor of Lézignan-Corbières
- In office 7 April 2014 – 5 July 2020
- Preceded by: Pierre Tournier
- Succeeded by: Gerard Forcada

Community Councillor of Région Lézignanaise, Corbières and Minervois
- In office 30 March 2014 – 2020

Municipal Councillor of Lézignan-Corbières
- In office 30 March 2014 – 15 March 2020

Personal details
- Born: 13 July 1948 Aude, Occitania, France
- Died: 12 September 2021 (aged 73) Lézignan-Corbières, France
- Political party: Socialist Party
- Rugby league career

Playing information
- Position: second-row
Club
Years	Team	Pld	T	G	FG	P
19??–80	FC Lézignan
Representative
Years	Team	Pld	T	G	FG	P
1974–79	France	8	0	0	0	0

Coaching information
Representative
Years	Team	Gms	W	D	L	W%
1982–83	France	1	0	0	1	0
- As of 9 February 2021

Michel Maïque (13 July 1948 – 12 September 2021) was a French rugby league player and politician, and socialist Mayor of Lézignan-Corbières from 2014 to 2020.

== Playing career ==
Former second-row FC Lézignan, he was a French international, with 8 caps between 1974 and 1979. He was seleccted for France's 1975 Rugby League World Cup squad. During the 1978 Kangaroo tour of Great Britain and France he captained the France national team in both test victories against Australia. He was selected in the france team for the 1979 European Rugby League Championship.

Maïque coached France between 1982 and 1983. During the 1982 Kangaroo tour of Great Britain and France he was coach of the French national team against the visiting Australians. He coached the France national team for one fixture, in a 17-5 defeat to Great Britain on 6 March 1983 in Hull.

== After Rugby ==
He retired as player in 1980 at 32 years. In his civil life, he was a teacher. He died on 12 September 2021 after suffering from acute pancreatitis and was buried at the Conilhac-Corbières cemetery.
