= Ian Freeman (rugby league) =

Australian rugby league player

Personal information
- Born: 31 August 1957 (age 67)

Playing information
- Position: Prop
Club
Years	Team	Pld	T	G	FG	P
1983–89	Western Suburbs	65	3	0	0	12
1989–90	Barrow
	Total	65	3	0	0	12

Ian Freeman (born 31 August 1957), also known by the nickname of "Herbie", is an Australian former professional rugby league footballer who played in the 1980s and 1990s. He played for the Western Suburbs Magpies. He played 65 first grade games in the New South Wales Rugby League premiership with the Magpies, and then spent a season playing with Barrow in England. He was described as a "hard man" known for his "rugged play". He was also known for being bald and bearded.

== Club career ==
A Cooma junior, Freeman made his first-grade debut with the Western Suburbs Magpies in the first game of the 1983 season. He was a regular in the side that year, playing at either prop or second row. The next year he made just 4 appearances, all losses.

With the threat of Wests being kicked out of the competition, Freeman spent the 1985 season playing with Cooma in the country Group 16 league. Returning to Wests, he was often the starting prop in 1986, and again in 1987 when he made 22 appearances for the season. In 1986 he captained the Magpies when they had a surprise 30–20 victory over Manly

Freeman missed the first 4 games of the 1988 season due to a suspension imposed after a head-high tackle in a pre-season National-Panasonic Cup match. Freeman denied the charge, saying, "He went down fairly easily and when I slung him to the ground his head hit hard. I thought my tackle was hard but it was fair." On-ground officials disagreed, saying the opposing player had been unconscious before he hit the ground. Freeman received a reduced sentence because of his previously clean record.

Freeman spent two more years with Wests, before playing for Barrow in the 1989/90 English season.

After retiring, Freeman spent a season coaching Junee.

Freeman was honoured as a bench player in the Western Suburbs Magpies' Team of the Eighties.
