= Alan Smith (rugby league, born 1955) =

Australian rugby league footballer

Allan Smith
Personal information
- Full name: Allan Thomas Smith
- Born: 2 May 1955 (age 69); Toowoomba Region, Queensland, Australia

Playing information
- Position: Five-eighth, Centre
Club
| Years | Team | Pld | T | G | FG | P |
|---|---|---|---|---|---|---|
| | Valleys (Toowoomba) |
| 1980–81 | North Sydney Bears | 31 | 3 | 1 | 0 | 11 |
| 1982–1983 | Canberra Raiders | 11 | 2 | 0 | 0 | 6 |
Representative
| Years | Team | Pld | T | G | FG | P |
| 1976–1980 | Queensland | 7 | 4 | 0 | 0 | 12 |
- Source: As of 4 November 2019

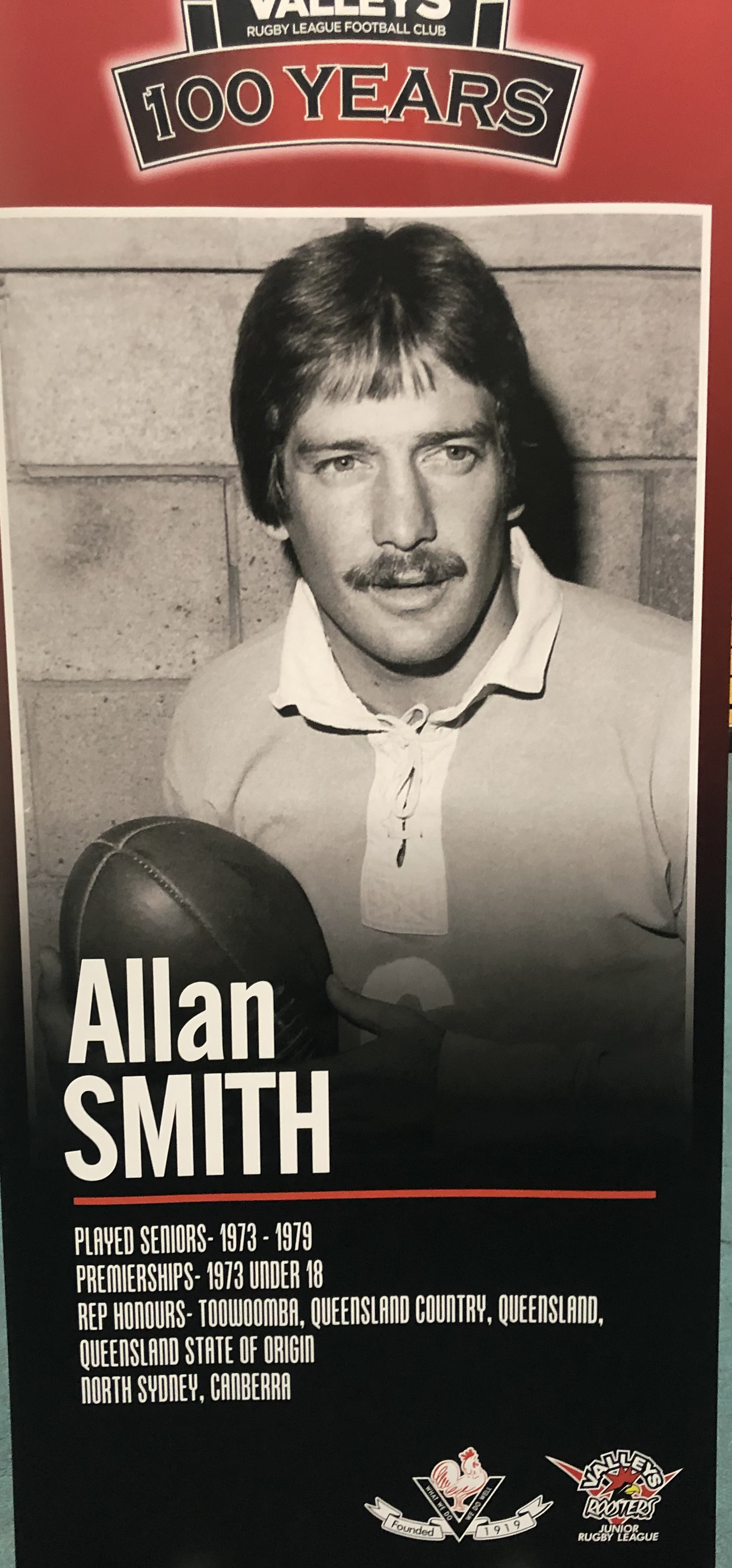
Allan Smith

A rugby league footballer who played in the 1970s and 1980s. He played for Valleys Toowoomba, Toowoomba Clydesdales, Queensland, North Sydney, Inaugural Queensland State of Origin 1980, Canberra Raiders. Went on to be Queensland Maroons and Australian Selector 1996-2016.

Allan Smith is an Australian former rugby league footballer who played in the 1970s and 1980s. Allan started his football career in Toowoomba playing for Valleys. Allan Smith played for the Queensland Maroons.

== Biography ==
Originally from the Toowoomba Region, where he played for Valleys, he represented the Queensland team in 1976 to 1979. It was the 1979 game where he scored a record 4 tries in Queensland's loss to New South Wales. He then moved to the New South Wales Rugby League premiership to play for the North Sydney Bears, making him no longer eligible for selection for Queensland in the first two matches of the 1980 interstate series. However, with the last match of that series being the experimental first ever State of Origin match, Smith was able to be recalled to play five-eighth for the Maroons. After playing in the Canberra Raiders inaugural season in 1982 and also 1983 Smith went onto Captain/Coach the Gold Coast Tigers to a Premiership and also played for and coached the Gold Coast Vikings Representative Team. In 1988 he joined the coaching staff of the Gold Coast Giants/Seagulls in the NSW Rugby League Premiership. He has since been a selector for the Queensland Origin team and Australian Kangaroos from 1996-2016.
