= Samuela Vucago =

Fijian–born rugby league footballer

Personal information
- Full name: Samuela Savou Cavuilati Vucago
- Born: 26 December 1952 (age 73) Nakavu, Fiji

Playing information
- Position: Fullback
Club
Years	Team	Pld	T	G	FG	P
1982	Canberra Raiders	5	0	0	0	0
Representative
Years	Team	Pld	T	G	FG	P
1979	NSW Country	1	0	0	0	0

Samuela Savou Cavuilati Vucago (born 26 December 1952) is a Fijian–born former soccer and rugby league footballer of the 1970s and 1980s. He played professional rugby league for the Canberra Raiders.

== Biography ==
Born in Nakavu, Fiji, Vucago grew up in Nadi with his four brothers and one sister. He was a Fiji schoolboys representative for association football (soccer), a sport in which he would earn full representative honours, appearing for Fiji at both the 1971 South Pacific Games and 1973 Oceania Cup. During the Oceania Cup, Vucago and his teammate Keni Kawaleva were scouted to play soccer for ACT club Monaro.

Vucago, who played rugby union for Nadi province, appeared for the Queanbeyan Whites during his early years in Australia and in 1975 was recruited to rugby league, joining the Queanbeyan Kangaroos. He represented Monaro in rugby league and in 1979 was fullback for NSW Country against NSW City. After captain–coaching the Kangaroos to the 1981 grand final, Vucago was a foundation player for the Canberra Raiders, making five first–grade appearances in 1982 as an understudy to Rowan Brennan, along with a total of 34 reserves matches.
