= Mark Broadhurst =

English cricketer

Mark Broadhurst (20 June 1974 in Barnsley, Yorkshire, England) is a former English right arm fast bowler and right-handed batsman, who played for Yorkshire from 1991 to 1994. He also appeared for Nottinghamshire in 1996.

Broadhurst took part in six first-class cricket matches, and took seven wickets at 41.47, and scored seven runs at 2.33. He played one List A match, without success with the ball. He played thirteen matches for England Young Cricketers and England Under 19s, taking 34 wickets at 37.94. Broadhurst's career was prematurely brought to an end due to him suffering from the "yips".
