= John Griffin (rugby league) =

New Zealand international rugby league footballer

Personal information
- Full name: John Charles Griffin
- Born: 10 June 1956 (age 69) West Coast Region, New Zealand

Playing information
Club
Years	Team	Pld	T	G	FG	P
	Runanga
Representative
Years	Team	Pld	T	G	FG	P
	West Coast
1976	South Island
1982	New Zealand	1	0	0	0	0

John Charles Griffin is a New Zealand rugby league footballer who represented the New Zealand national rugby league team.

== Playing career ==
A West Coast representative, Griffin represented the South Island in 1976 in a match against Sydney Metropolitan.

Griffin was the West Coast Rugby League player of the year in 1982. Griffin was selected for the New Zealand national rugby league team in 1982, and earned 1 cap, becoming Kiwi number 569.
