= Shane McKellar =

Australian rugby league footballer

Personal information
- Full name: Shane McKellar

Playing information
- Position: Wing, Centre
Club
| Years | Team | Pld | T | G | FG | P |
|---|---|---|---|---|---|---|
| 1980 | St. George | 15 | 3 | 6 | 0 | 21 |
| 1981 | Newtown Jets | 15 | 5 | 0 | 0 | 15 |
| 1982–83 | Illawarra Steelers | 47 | 31 | 0 | 0 | 111 |
| 1984–85 | Eastern Suburbs | 20 | 8 | 2 | 0 | 36 |
| | Total | 97 | 47 | 8 | 0 | 183 |
- Source: As of 25 February 2019

Shane McKellar nicknamed "Fox" is an Australian former professional rugby league footballer who played in the 1980s. McKellar was a foundation player for Illawarra, playing in the club's first game.

== Playing career ==
McKellar made his first grade debut for St George in Round 1 1980 against South Sydney at Kogarah Oval.

In 1981, McKellar joined Newtown and played 15 times for the club including the 1981 NSWRL grand final defeat against Parramatta.

In 1982, McKellar joined newly admitted Illawarra and played in the club's first ever game which was against Penrith at WIN Stadium and ended in a 17–7 loss.

McKellar ended the 1982 season as the club's joint top try scorer. In 1983, McKellar finished as the club's top try scorer again with 18 tries.

In 1984, McKellar joined Eastern Suburbs and spent 2 seasons with them before retiring at the end of 1985.

== Post playing ==
McKellar was an Illawarra board member from 1997 to 2011 and Illawarra Division chairman from 1998 to 2011. In 2012, McKellar was awarded life membership at the club.
