= Lew Platz =

Australian rugby league footballer

Personal information
- Born: 2 October 1952 (age 73) Clifton, Queensland, Australia

Playing information
- Position: Second-row, Hooker
Club
Years	Team	Pld	T	G	FG	P
19??–7?	Wynnum Manly
1978–80	Parramatta	29	8	0	0	24
1981–83	Penrith	59	8	0	0	26
	Total	88	16	0	0	50
Representative
Years	Team	Pld	T	G	FG	P
1975	Australia	6	2	0	0	6
1973–77	Queensland	8	0	0	0	0
- Relatives: Greg Platz (brother)

Lew Platz (born 2 October 1952) is an Australian former professional rugby league footballer who played in the 1970s and 1980s. In his career he played for and the Penrith Panthers and the Parramatta Eels clubs and also represented Australia and Queensland on several occasions. Platz's position for the majority of his career was at second-row but he also played at hooker. His brother Greg Platz was also a top grade rugby league player.

== Playing career ==
Platz initially played in the Brisbane Rugby League competition with the Wynnum-Manly club, gaining selection to represent Queensland. During the 1974 Great Britain Lions tour he was selected to play for Queensland as a reserve against the tourists. Platz also played for Australia in the 1975 Rugby League World Cup. In 1978, Platz made the move to Sydney and played with Parramatta.

In 1979, he was a member of the Parramatta side which made it to the preliminary final but were defeated by eventual premiers St George.

At the end of 1980, Platz was told to find a new club by the newly appointed coach Jack Gibson. In 2017, Platz recalled being told the news he was no longer wanted at Parramatta saying “I played all the pre-season, including the last trial against Manly, when I had conjunctivitis, something I had never had before and have not had since,” Platz said. “I got a phone call at midnight after the game. ‘Jack here’. I thought it was captain Steve Edge [playing a trick]. “He said, "No, it’s Jack". I was an import, and you were only allowed 12. Jack said: "I thought I should ring you before you get tomorrow’s paper. I never graded you. I regard you as a first grader, but I’ve got a couple of blokes here I’m going to use more than you and I don’t think you want to play reserve grade. “I said "Jack, what a thing to do when I’m an import!". "He said, "I’ve been sacked by plenty of places and I’ve always come back, and you will. Somebody will find you", and he hung up.

In 1981, Platz signed with Penrith and played there for three years before retiring at the end of the 1983 season.
