= Simon Brockwell =

Australian rugby league footballer and administrator

Personal information
- Full name: Simon Brockwell
- Born: 27 December 1956 (age 68)

Playing information
- Position: Centre, Lock, Second-row
Club
| Years | Team | Pld | T | G | FG | P |
|---|---|---|---|---|---|---|
| 1981–87 | North Sydney | 104 | 26 | 0 | 0 | 87 |
| 1985–86 | Leigh | 11 | 4 | 0 | 0 | 16 |
| | Total | 115 | 30 | 0 | 0 | 103 |
Representative
| Years | Team | Pld | T | G | FG | P |
| 1980 | NSW Country | 1 | 0 | 0 | 0 | 0 |

Simon Brockwell is an Australian former rugby league footballer who played in the 1970s and 1980s. He played for North Sydney in the New South Wales Rugby League (NSWRL) competition. Brockwell also played for Leigh in England.

== Background ==
Brockwell represented NSW Country in 1980 before signing with Norths for the 1981 season.

== Playing career ==
Brockwell made his first grade debut for North Sydney in round 1 1981 against South Sydney at Redfern Oval which ended in a 22-7 victory with Brockwell scoring a try. Brockwell ended the season as the club's top try scorer with 10 tries.

In 1982, Norths had one of the best seasons finishing third on the table. Brockwell played in both finals games as Norths crashed out in the semi-finals against Eastern Suburbs.

During the off season in Australia, Brockwell signed a contract to play with English side Leigh. Brockwell returned to Australia with Norths and played in the club's 1986 finals loss against Balmain at the Sydney Cricket Ground. Brockwell played one finals season for the club in 1987 before retiring.
