= Bill Oxley =

English rugby league footballer and coach

Personal information
- Full name: William B. Oxley
- Born: c. 1920 Barrow-in-Furness, England
- Died: 1985

Playing information
Club
Years	Team	Pld	T	G	FG	P
1945–46	Barrow	2	1			3
1946	Bradford Northern
1946–48	Rochdale Hornets
1948–50	Barrow	17	0
	Total	19	1	0	0	3

Coaching information
Representative
Years	Team	Gms	W	D	L	W%
1975	England

William B. Oxley (c. 1920 – 1985) was an English professional rugby league footballer who played in the 1940s and 1950s, and was a rugby league administrator of the 1960s, 1970s and 1980s. He played at club level for Barrow (two spells), Bradford Northern and Rochdale Hornets (captain).

== Background ==
Bill Oxley's was born in Barrow-in-Furness, Lancashire. World War II began four days after Bill Oxley had signed professionally for Barrow, he served with the Royal Horse Artillery in World War II for five years. He died in 1985.

== Playing career ==
Bill Oxley scored one try for Barrow, it came in the 21-3 victory over Broughton Rangers at Craven Park, Barrow-in-Furness on Saturday 23 March 1946. He then returned to the amateur ranks, but was offered a trial by Bradford Northern, and played for the club in April 1946. Oxley was offered a contract by the club, but he chose to sign with Rochdale Hornets instead.

Oxley returned to Barrow for a second spell in 1948, and played in the club's 0–10 defeat by eventual winners Bradford Northern in the 1948–49 Challenge Cup semi-final during the 1948–49 season at Station Road, Swinton.

== Administrative career ==
Oxley joined the board of directors at Barrow during the 1960s. He was appointed as England's team manager for the 1975 Rugby League World Championship. In 1978, he was named as chairman for the Great Britain selection committee.
