= Trevor Skerrett =

Former GB & Wales international rugby league footballer

Personal information
- Born: 6 March 1953 (age 72); Leeds, England

Playing information
- Position: Prop, Second-row
Club
Years	Team	Pld	T	G	FG	P
1974–80	Wakefield Trinity	203	26	0		78
1980–86	Hull FC	160	18	0		57
1986–87	Leeds	27	1	0		4
1987–89	Keighley	57	2	0		8
	Total	447	47	0	0	147
Representative
Years	Team	Pld	T	G	FG	P
1977	Great Britain (U-24s)	1
1978–84	Wales	7	0	0	0	0
1979–82	Great Britain	10	0	0	0	0

Trevor Skerrett (born 6 March 1953) is an English former professional rugby league footballer who played in the 1970s and 1980s. He played at representative level for Great Britain (Under-24s), Great Britain and Wales, and at club level for Wakefield Trinity, Hull FC, Leeds and Keighley, as a prop, or second-row.

== Playing career ==
=== Wakefield Trinity career ===
Hailing from the Belle Isle area of Leeds, Trevor played for Bisons Sports ARL before signing for Wakefield Trinity, as a 20-year-old, in August 1974. He débuted within a few weeks, coming off the substitutes bench in a 12–12 home draw with Castleford. In only his seventh Trinity game, he was in the line up for the 1974 Yorkshire Cup Final, only to suffer defeat by second division, Hull Kingston Rovers, 13–16 at Headingley, Leeds on 26 October 1974. Six months later, after a great cup run, Trinity and Trevor were one-step away from Wembley after a 7–13 defeat by Widnes in the Challenge Cup semi-final.

In 1977 he appeared for Great Britain under 24s against France, at Hull and a year later he represented Wales against Australia at Swansea, Trevor qualifying for the Welsh through grandparents. His displays for Trinity and two more appearances for Wales, in 1979, got him noticed and the likeable Skerrett deservedly earned a place on the 1979 Great Britain touring squad to Australia. Prior to the tour, he achieved an ambition of playing at Wembley as Trinity lost to Widnes in the RL Challenge Cup Final, earning great praise with a man of the match performance in the 9-7 semi-final victory over St. Helens.

‘Down Under’, Trevor was one of the few players to impress and made his GB début in the first test against Australia at Lang Park, Brisbane. He gained four caps on the tour, playing in the second test at the SCG in Sydney and the second and third tests against New Zealand and Christchurch and Auckland. He played another twelve games on the tour. A fourth Welsh cap followed in January 1980, but within a few months he was transferred to Hull for a record £40,000 fee.

Trevor Skerrett earned a reputation of being one of the hardest forwards in the game in his day, as well as one of the fairest and most well respected. He played 203 Trinity first team games in his six seasons, scoring twenty six tries, and remains one of only eight Trinity forwards to take on the might of the Australian pack in test matches and one of only two in the last 47 years.

Trevor Skerrett played at prop in Wakefield Trinity's 3–12 defeat by Widnes in the 1979 Challenge Cup Final during the 1978–79 season at Wembley Stadium, London on Saturday 5 May 1979, in front of a crowd of a crowd of 94,218,

He was inducted into the club's Hall of Fame in 2015

=== Hull F.C. Career ===
Trevor Skerrett played 160 games for Hull (1980–86), playing in nine finals, winning four, as well as the 1983 Championship and adding to his Welsh and GB caps. He made his début at Featherstone Rovers (August 1980), scoring in a 12-16 Yorkshire Cup loss. Hull reached the Premiership Trophy Final in his first season, losing out to Hull Kingston Rovers, 7–11, at Headingley. This was one of nine finals Trevor was to play in for Hull. Trevor Skerrett played at prop in Hull FC's 14–14 draw with Widnes in the 1982 Challenge Cup Final during the 1981–82 season at Wembley Stadium, London on Saturday 1 May 1982, in front of a crowd of 92,147, and played at second-row in the 18–9 victory over Widnes in the 1982 Challenge Cup Final replay during the 1981–82 season at Elland Road, Leeds on Wednesday 19 May 1982, in front of a crowd of 41,171. Trevor Skerrett gained revenge against Hull KR, defeating 'The Robins' in the John Player Trophy, 12–4 at Headingley. A second Wembley defeat came in 1983 as well as a third consecutive Premiership Trophy loss, although he gained a Yorkshire Cup winners medal to go alongside his 1983 Championship winners (First Division) medal. In 1984, he gained his greatest honour when he was selected to captain Great Britain on their tour 'Down Under' only for injury to rob him of the honour. Injury would affect him for the rest of his Hull career, causing him to miss the 1985 RL Challenge Cup Final. He gained an extra six GB caps and represented Yorkshire three times, whilst at the Boulevard

He played in Hull FC's 12–14 defeat by Featherstone Rovers in the 1983 Challenge Cup Final during the 1982–83 season at Wembley Stadium, London on Saturday 7 May 1983.

He played at prop in Hull FC's 18–7 victory over Bradford Northern in the 1982 Yorkshire Cup Final during the 1982–83 season at Elland Road, Leeds on Saturday 2 October 1982, and also played at prop in the 13–2 victory over Castleford in the 1983 Yorkshire Cup Final during the 1983–84 season at Elland Road, Leeds on Saturday 15 October 1983.

Skerrett played at prop and was man of the match in Hull FC's 12–4 victory over Hull Kingston Rovers in the 1981–82 John Player Trophy Final during the 1981–82 season at Headingley, Leeds on Saturday 23 January 1982.

=== Later career ===
Trevor Skerrett was transferred to Leeds in September 1986 in a exchange deal that saw Kevin Dick join Hull, and Andy Gascoigne also join Skerrett at Leeds. In his only season, he played 27 games, scoring one try.

In August 1987, he was transferred to Keighley where he made 57 appearances before retiring in 1989.

=== International honours ===
Trevor Skerrett won caps for Wales while at Wakefield Trinity in 1978 against Australia, in 1979 against France, and England, in 1980 against France, and while at Hull in 1981 against France, and England, in 1984 against England, and won caps for Great Britain while at Wakefield Trinity in 1979 against Australia (2 matches), and New Zealand (2 matches), and while at Hull in 1980 against New Zealand (2 matches), in 1981 against France (2 matches), and in 1982 against Australia (2 matches). In addition to these Test Matches, Skerrett played at second-row in Great Britain's 7–8 defeat by France in the friendly at Stadio Pier Luigi Penzo, Venice on Saturday 31 July 1982.

== Honours ==
- Rugby League Championship: 1982–83
- Challenge Cup: 1981–82
- Yorkshire Cup: 1982–83, 1983–84
- John Player Trophy: 1981–82

Achievements
Preceded by Phil Hogan	Rugby League Transfer Record; Wakefield Trinity to Hull FC; 1980-81	Succeeded by George Fairbairn
