= Lewis Hudson =

New Zealand international rugby league footballer

Personal information
- Born: 8 May 1955 (age 70); Christchurch, New Zealand

Playing information
- Position: Centre
Club
Years	Team	Pld	T	G	FG	P
1974–86	Linwood		100	558	23	1458
1976–77	Warrington	8	1	0	0	3
	Total	8	101	558	23	1461
Representative
Years	Team	Pld	T	G	FG	P
1975–83	Canterbury		15	71	2	190
1979–83	New Zealand	3	0	0	0	0

Lewis Hudson is a New Zealand rugby league player who represented New Zealand.

== Playing career ==
Hudson played for the Linwood Keas (from Linwood, Christchurch) in the Canterbury Rugby League competition, and Warrington. He amassed 1458 points for Linwood Keas over thirteen seasons with the club between 1974 and 1986. He also represented Canterbury between 1975 and 1983, scoring 190 points for his district.

He played three test matches for New Zealand between 1979 and 1982.
