= Peter McGrath =

Australian rugby league footballer

Peter McGrath AM
Personal information
- Full name: Peter McGrath
- Born: January 1955 (age 71) Canberra, ACT, Australia
- Height: 173 cm (5 ft 8 in)

Playing information
- Position: Centre, Fullback, Five-eighth
Club
Years	Team	Pld	T	G	FG	P
1982	Canberra Raiders	14	1	19	0	41
Representative
Years	Team	Pld	T	G	FG	P
1977–1981	NSW Country	4	0	0	0	0
- Source: As of 28 February 2019

Peter McGrath AM is an Australian former professional rugby league footballer who played in the 1970s and 1980s. McGrath played for Canberra in the NSWRL competition. McGrath was a foundation player for Canberra playing in the club's first ever game.

== Background ==
McGrath was born in Canberra, Australian Capital Territory and played with the Queanbeyan Blues in the country rugby league competition before signing with Canberra.

== Playing career ==
In 1982, McGrath joined newly admitted Canberra and played in the club's first ever game, a 37–7 loss against South Sydney at Redfern Oval. McGrath is credited with scoring the club's first points. Canberra would only go on to win 4 games in 1982 and finished last on the table claiming the wooden spoon. As of 2019, this is the only time that Canberra has finished last.

== Post playing ==
McGrath went on to become the chairman of ACT Brumbies and also the chairman of the Australian Rugby Union. McGrath currently works as a lawyer in Canberra.

In 2022, McGrath was appointed as a Member of the Order of Australia (AM) in the 2022 Australia Day Honours for "significant service to rugby union as an administrator, and to tertiary education".
