= Don Munro =

New Zealand international rugby league footballer

Personal information
- Full name: Donald Wayne Munro
- Born: 27 September 1952 (age 72)

Playing information
- Position: Wing
Club
Years	Team	Pld	T	G	FG	P
1970–76	Porirua City
Representative
Years	Team	Pld	T	G	FG	P
1970–76	Wellington	36
1974–75	New Zealand	3	0	0	0	0

Donald Wayne Munro is a New Zealand former professional rugby league footballer who played in the 1970s. He played at representative level for New Zealand, and Wellington, as a wing.

== Playing career ==
Munro played for the Porirua City club in the Wellington Rugby League competition.

== Representative career ==
Between 1970 and 1976 Munro played thirty six times for Wellington.

Munro was first selected for the New Zealand national rugby league team in 1974, in the squad for three test matches against the Great Britain Lions. Munro did not play in that series but he was selected to tour Australia in 1975, scoring six tries in seven games; including four on debut, against Central Queensland, at Rockhampton. He played three test matches later in the year, World Championship matches against France, England and Wales. He was dropped for the northern hemisphere tour of the Championship and did not play for the Kiwis again.
