= Peter Glynn =

England international rugby league footballer (1952–2024)

Personal information
- Born: 7 January 1952 Widnes, England
- Died: January 2024 (aged 71)

Playing information
- Position: Fullback, Wing, Centre, Stand-off
Club
Years	Team	Pld	T	G	FG	P
1975–83	St. Helens	258	118	86	5	531
1983–89	Salford	144	24	1	6	104
1989	Chorley Borough
1989–91	Trafford Borough
	Total	402	142	87	11	635
Representative
Years	Team	Pld	T	G	FG	P
1979	England	2	0	0	0	0
198?	Lancashire	6	0	0	0	0

Peter Glynn (7 January 1952 – January 2024) was an English professional rugby league footballer who played in the 1970s and 1980s. He played at representative level for England, and at club level for St. Helens and Salford, as a fullback, wing, centre, or stand-off.

== Background ==
Glynn was born in Widnes, Lancashire, England on 7 January 1952. He died in January 2024, at the age of 71.

== Playing career ==
=== World Club Challenge Final appearances ===
Glynn was a substitute in St. Helens 2-25 defeat by the 1975 NSWRFL season premiers, Eastern Suburbs Roosters in the unofficial 1976 World Club Challenge at Sydney Cricket Ground on Tuesday 29 June 1976.

=== Challenge Cup Final appearances ===
Glynn appeared as a substitute (replacing Billy Benyon) and scored two tries in St. Helens' 20-5 victory over Widnes in the 1976 Challenge Cup Final during the 1975–76 season at Wembley Stadium, London on Saturday 8 May 1976.

=== BBC2 Floodlit Trophy Final appearances ===
Glynn played on the wing in St. Helens' 11-26 defeat by Hull Kingston Rovers in the 1977 BBC2 Floodlit Trophy Final during the 1977–78 season at Craven Park, Kingston upon Hull on Tuesday 13 December 1977, and played at centre and scored two tries, and a goal in the 7-13 defeat by Widnes in the 1978 BBC2 Floodlit Trophy Final during the 1978–79 season at Knowsley Road, St. Helens on Tuesday 12 December 1978. The record for the most tries in a BBC2 Floodlit Trophy Final is two tries, and is jointly held by; Roy Mathias, Peter Glynn, Gerald Dunn and Stuart Wright.

=== International honours ===
Glynn won caps for England while at St. Helens in 1979 against Wales, and France.
