= Toa Fepuleai =

NZ international rugby league player (1954-2022)

Personal information
- Full name: Gasetoa Fepuleai
- Born: 13 May 1954 Vaivase, Apia, Western Samoa
- Died: December 2022 (aged 68) Auckland, New Zealand

Playing information
- Position: Wing
Club
Years	Team	Pld	T	G	FG	P
	Richmond
Representative
Years	Team	Pld	T	G	FG	P
	Auckland
	New Zealand Māori
1978–80	New Zealand	4

Gasetoa Fepuleai (known as Toa or Gus Fepuleai) is a New Zealand former rugby league footballer who represented New Zealand.

== Early years ==
Fepuleai was born in Western Samoa and attended Seddon High School where he played at fullback in the school's rugby union first XV.

== Playing career ==
Fepuleai joined the Richmond rugby league club in the Auckland Rugby League competition. In 1976 he won the Tetley Trophy as top try scorer.

He made his New Zealand national rugby league team debut in 1978, on the wing.

In 1979 Fepuleai played for both Auckland and New Zealand Māori against the touring Great Britain Lions side. He was also a part of the Richmond side that won the Auckland premiership in 1979, a title they defended in 1980.

== Later years ==
Fepuleai later served as the chairman of the Richmond Rovers club.
