= Phil Jackson (rugby league 1970s) =

Former England international rugby league footballer

Personal information
- Born: 1950s Bradford

Playing information
- Position: Prop, Second-row
Club
Years	Team	Pld	T	G	FG	P
1971–83	Bradford Northern	147	9	2	0	31
Representative
Years	Team	Pld	T	G	FG	P
1975	England	2	0	0	0	0

Philip Jackson (1950s) is an English former professional rugby league footballer who played in the 1970s and 1980s. He played at representative level for England, and at club level for Bradford Northern, as a prop or second-row.

== Playing career ==
=== Club career ===
Jackson made his debut for Bradford Northern in August 1971. He played at prop in Bradford Northern's 3-2 victory over Widnes in the 1974–75 Player's No.6 Trophy Final during the 1974–75 season at Wilderspool Stadium, Warrington on Saturday 25 January 1975.

=== International honours ===
Phil Jackson won caps for England while at Bradford Northern in 1975 against Wales, and in the 1975 Rugby League World Cup against France.
