= Greg Cook (rugby league) =

Australian rugby league footballer

Personal information
- Full name: Gregory Cook
- Born: 25 May 1956 (age 70) Sydney, New South Wales, Australia

Playing information
- Position: Prop, Lock, Second-row
Club
Years	Team	Pld	T	G	FG	P
1977–81	Canterbury-Bankstown	35	1	0	0	3
1982–83	Illawarra Steelers	19	1	0	0	3
	Total	54	2	0	0	6
Representative
Years	Team	Pld	T	G	FG	P
1979	New South Wales	1	0	0	0	0
- Source: As of 18 Aug 2022

Greg Cook is an Australian former professional rugby league footballer who played in the 1970s and 1980s. Cook was a foundation player for Illawarra, playing in the club's first game.

== Playing career ==
Cook made his first grade debut for Canterbury in Round 20 1977 against Parramatta at Cumberland Oval.

In 1979, Cook enjoyed a breakout season playing 16 games and being selected to represent New South Wales. Cook played at lock in Canterbury's 17–13 loss in the 1979 NSWRL grand final against St George.

In 1980, Cook was limited to only 5 games due to injury and missed out on playing in the 1980 NSWRL grand final victory over Eastern Suburbs breaking a 38-year premiership drought.

In 1982, Cook joined newly admitted Illawarra and played in the club's first ever game which was against Penrith at WIN Stadium and ended in a 17–7 loss. Cook is credited with scoring the club's first ever try.

Cook retired at the end of 1983.
