= Tony Quirk =

Australian rugby league footballer

Personal information
- Full name: Anthony Quirk
- Born: 11 February 1956 (age 70) Tumut, New South Wales, Australia

Playing information
- Height: 181 cm (5 ft 11 in)
- Weight: 12 st (170 lb; 76 kg)
- Position: Fullback
Club
Years	Team	Pld	T	G	FG	P
1975–77	St George Dragons	28	7	19	0	59
1978	North Sydney	19	4	11	0	34
	Total	47	11	30	0	93

Tony Quirk (born 11 February 1956) is an Australian former professional rugby league footballer who played in the 1970s.

== Playing career ==
Anthony 'Tony' Quirk played for the St George Dragons at fullback for three seasons between 1975-1977.

Initially used to replace recently retired captain-coach Graeme Langlands during 1976, Quirk played out the season at fullback, but by 1977 had lost his place in the first grade team to Ted Goodwin.

He was used as a reserve during the 1977 Grand Final draw, and is remembered for a field goal attempt that would have won the match. It hit the cross-bar and the game ended in a draw.

He saw out his career at North Sydney for one season in 1978 before retiring.
