= Alan Redfearn =

GB & England international rugby league footballer

Personal information
- Full name: Alan Redfearn
- Born: 31 August 1952 (age 72); Batley, West Riding of Yorkshire, England

Playing information
- Position: Scrum-half
Club
Years	Team	Pld	T	G	FG	P
1973–83	Bradford Northern	244	16	0	21	69
Representative
Years	Team	Pld	T	G	FG	P
1979–80	England	2	0	0	1	1
1979	Great Britain	1	0	0	0	0
- Relatives: David Redfearn (brother)

Alan Redfearn (born 31 August 1952) is an English former professional rugby league footballer who played in the 1970s and 1980s. He played at representative level for Great Britain and England, and at club level for Bradford Northern, as a scrum-half.

== Background ==
Alan Redfearn was born in Batley, West Riding of Yorkshire, England.

== Playing career ==
=== Club career ===
Redfearn joined Bradford Northern from local side Shaw Cross in 1971. He made his first team debut in April 1973.

His first honours with the club came in the 1977–78 season, starting at scrum-half in Bradford Northern's 17–8 win over Widnes in the 1977–78 Premiership at Station Road, Swinton on 20 May 1978.

Redfearn played stand-off, and scored a try in Bradford Northern's 18–8 victory over York in the 1978 Yorkshire Cup Final during the 1978–79 season at Headingley, Leeds on Saturday 28 October 1978, and played stand-off, and scored a try in the 5–10 defeat by Castleford in the 1981 Yorkshire Cup Final during the 1981–82 season at Headingley, Leeds on Saturday 3 October 1981.

Redfearn played scrum-half in Bradford Northern's 6–0 victory over Widnes in the 1979–80 John Player Trophy Final during the 1979–80 season at Headingley, Leeds on Saturday 5 January 1980.

Redfearn also helped Bradford win two consecutive league championships, in 1979–80 and 1980–81.

=== International honours ===
Alan Redfearn won two caps for England while at Bradford Northern, in 1979 and 1980 (both matches against France).

He toured with Great Britain in 1979, earning one cap for the team in the third Test against Australia.

== Personal life ==
Alan Redfearn is the younger brother of the rugby league footballer; David Redfearn.
