= Phil Hogan (rugby league) =

Great Britain and England international rugby league footballer (born 1954)

Personal information
- Born: October 1954 Barrow-in-Furness, England

Playing information
- Position: Second-row, Loose forward
Club
Years	Team	Pld	T	G	FG	P
1971–78	Barrow	152	46	173		484
1978–88	Hull Kingston Rovers	254	65	53	1	316
≥1988–≥90	Barrow
	Total	406	111	226	1	800
Representative
Years	Team	Pld	T	G	FG	P
1973–78	Cumbria	5	0	14	0	28
1977–79	Great Britain	9	1	0	0	3
1979	England	1	0	0	0	0

Phil Hogan (born October 1954) is an English former professional rugby league footballer who played in the 1970s, 1980s and 1990s. He played at representative level for Great Britain and England, and at club level for Holker Pioneers ARLFC, Barrow (two spells) and Hull Kingston Rovers as a second-row or loose forward.

== Background ==
Phil Hogan was born in October 1954 in Barrow-in-Furness, Lancashire, England.

== Playing career ==
=== Club career ===
Hogan was transferred from Barrow to Hull Kingston Rovers in 1978 for a then world record fee of £33,000 (based on increases in average earnings, this would be approximately £249,700 in 2013).

Hogan was a substitute in Hull Kingston Rovers' 10–5 victory over Hull F.C. in the 1979–80 Challenge Cup Final during the 1979–80 season at Wembley Stadium, London on Saturday 3 May 1980, in front of a crowd of 95,000, and played left-centre in the 9–18 defeat by Widnes in the 1980–81 Challenge Cup Final during the 1980–81 season at Wembley Stadium, London on Saturday 2 May 1981, in front of a crowd of 92,496.

Hogan played left-centre and scored 2-goals in Hull Kingston Rovers' 7–8 defeat by Leeds in the 1980–81 Yorkshire Cup Final during the 1979–80 season at Fartown Ground, Huddersfield on Saturday 8 November 1980, and played right-second-row (replaced by substitute Andy Kelly) in the 22–18 victory over Castleford in the 1985–86 Yorkshire Cup Final during the 1985–86 season at Headingley, Leeds on Sunday 27 October 1985.

Hogan played left-centre in and scored a try Hull Kingston Rovers' 11–7 victory over Hull F.C. in the Premiership Final during the 1980–81 season at Headingley, Leeds on Saturday 16 May 1981.

Hogan played loose forward in Hull Kingston Rovers' 3–13 defeat by Hull F.C. in the 1979 BBC2 Floodlit Trophy Final during the 1979–80 season at The Boulevard, Hull on Tuesday 18 December 1979.

Hogan played left-centre in Hull Kingston Rovers' 4–12 defeat by Hull F.C. in the 1981–82 John Player Trophy Final during the 1981–82 season at Headingley, Leeds on Saturday 23 January 1982, and played right-second-row and scored a try in the 12–0 victory over Hull F.C. in the 1984–85 John Player Special Trophy Final during the 1984–85 season at Boothferry Park, Kingston upon Hull on Saturday 26 January 1985.

=== International honours ===
Hogan won a cap for England while at Hull Kingston Rovers in 1979 against France, and won caps for Great Britain while at Barrow in the 1977 Rugby League World Cup against France, New Zealand, and Australia (2 matches), in 1978 against Australia (sub), while at Hull Kingston Rovers in 1979 against Australia, Australia (sub), New Zealand, and New Zealand (sub).

== Post-playing ==
Following retirement from rugby, Hogan returned to his hometown, coaching in rugby union before later setting up a sports therapy centre.

== Honours ==
1977-1979 Great Britain International

1979 Great Britain Lions Tour of Australia & New Zealand

1977 World Cup Finalist

1978 World Record Transfer Fee (Barrow to Hull KR)

1979 England International

1983/84,1984/85 RL Championship Winner

1979/80 RL Challenge Cup Winner

1980/81 RL Premiership Winner (Try scorer in the final)

1984/85 John Player Trophy Winner (Try scorer in the final)

1985/86 Yorkshire Cup Winner

Achievements
Preceded by Steve Norton	Rugby league transfer record Barrow to Hull Kingston Rovers; 1978–1980	Succeeded by Trevor Skerrett
