= Steve Evans (rugby league) =

GB & England international rugby league footballer

Personal information
- Born: 6 June 1958; Featherstone, West Riding of Yorkshire, England
- Died: 16 September 2017 (aged 59)

Playing information
- Position: Wing, Centre, Stand-off
Club
Years	Team	Pld	T	G	FG	P
1976–82	Featherstone Rovers	140	76	1		230
1982–87	Hull FC	166	90
1986–87	Wakefield Trinity	15	4	2	0	20
1987	Bradford Northern		2	0	0	8
1988–89	Sheffield Eagles
	Total	321	172	3	0	258
Representative
Years	Team	Pld	T	G	FG	P
1979–82	Yorkshire	3	0	0	0	0
1979–80	England	3	1	0	0	3
1979–82	Great Britain	10	3	0	0	9

Steve Evans (6 June 1958 – 16 September 2017) was an English professional rugby league footballer who played in the 1970s and 1980s. He played at representative level for Great Britain, England and Yorkshire, and at club level for Featherstone Rovers, Hull FC, Bradford Northern and Wakefield Trinity, as a wing, centre or stand-off.

== Club career ==
=== Featherstone Rovers ===
Evans joined Featherstone Rovers in 1976 and was a member of the squad that won the 1976–77 Championship. The following season he played on the wing in Featherstone Rovers' 7–17 defeat by Castleford in the 1977 Yorkshire Cup Final during the 1977–78 season at Headingley, Leeds on Saturday 15 October 1977.

Steve Evans won caps for Yorkshire while at Featherstone Rovers; during the 1979–80 season against Cumbria and Lancashire, and during the 1981–82 season as an interchange/substitute against Cumbria.

=== Hull ===
In 1982 he was transferred to Hull FC for a fee of £70,000. At Hull he appeared in three Challenge Cup finals, the first in 1982 when he played at centre in Hull FC's 14–14 draw with Widnes in the 1982 Challenge Cup Final at Wembley Stadium, London on Saturday 1 May 1982, in front of a crowd of 92,147, and played at centre in the 18–9 victory over Widnes in the replay at Elland Road, Leeds on Wednesday 19 May 1982, in front of a crowd of 41,171.

The following year he played at centre in Hull's 12–14 defeat by his old side Featherstone.

The third was when he played at centre and scored a try in Hull FC's 24–28 defeat by Wigan in the 1985 Challenge Cup Final during the at Wembley Stadium on Saturday 4 May 1985, in front of a crowd of 99,801, in what is regarded as the most marvellous cup final in living memory, which Hull narrowly lost after fighting back from 12–28 down at half-time.

He also appeared on the wing, and scored a try in Hull's 18–7 victory over Bradford Northern in the 1982 Yorkshire Cup Final at Elland Road, Leeds on Saturday 2 October 1982, and played at centre and scored a try in the 18-7 victory over Bradford Northern in the 1984 Yorkshire Cup Final at Boothferry Park, Kingston upon Hull on Saturday 27 October 1984.

Evans played on the wing in Hull's 0–12 defeat by Hull Kingston Rovers in the 1984–85 John Player Special Trophy Final at Boothferry Park on Saturday 26 January 1985.

=== Later career ===
Evans left Hull in 1986 and had short careers at Bradford Northern and Wakefield Trinity before retiring as a player.

Between 2004 and 2006 he was chairman of Featherstone Rovers.

== International career ==
Evans won caps for England while at Featherstone Rovers in 1979 against France, in 1980 against Wales, and France, and won caps for Great Britain while at Featherstone Rovers in 1979 against Australia, Australia (sub) (2 matches), and New Zealand (3 matches), in 1980 against New Zealand, and New Zealand (sub).

While playing at Hull FC, Evans was selected to play in two of Great Britain's three games against Australia for the 1982 Ashes, scoring the Lions' sole try of the series.
