= Kevin Potter (rugby league) =

New Zealand international rugby league footballer

Personal information
- Full name: Kevin Bruce Potter
- Born: 25 October 1952 New Zealand

Playing information
- Position: Centre
Club
Years	Team	Pld	T	G	FG	P
	Maritime
Representative
Years	Team	Pld	T	G	FG	P
	Auckland
1975	New Zealand	0	0	0	0	0

Kevin Potter is a New Zealand former professional rugby league footballer who represented New Zealand in the 1975 World Cup, although he did not play in a match at the tournament.

He played for the Maritime club in the Auckland Rugby League competition.
