= John Woods (rugby league) =

Former RL coach and GB & England rugby league footballer

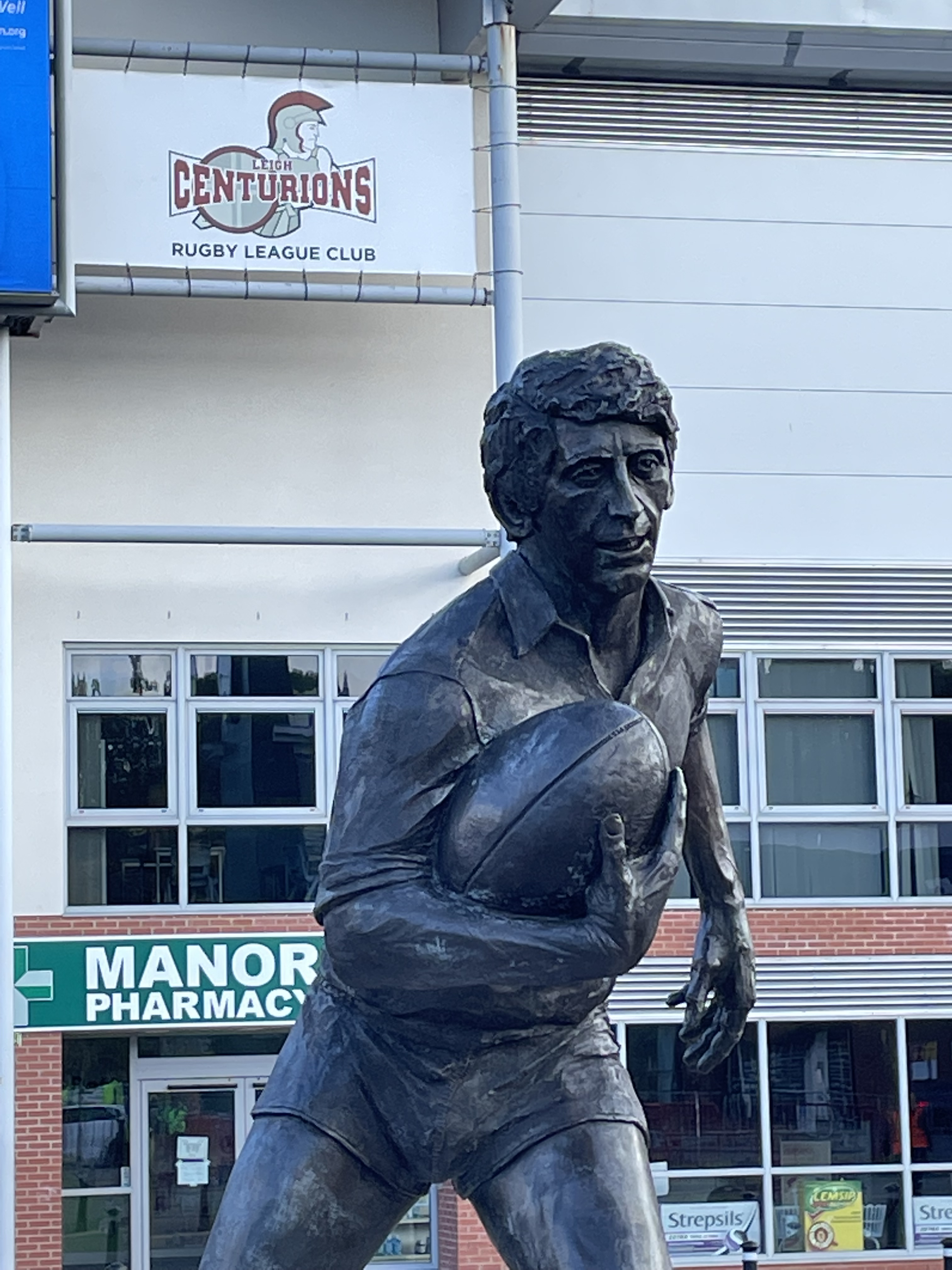
- John Woods Statue outside Leigh Sports Village (since 2016)

Personal information
- Full name: John Woods
- Born: 14 September 1956 (age 68); Leigh, Greater Manchester, England

Playing information
- Position: Fullback, Centre, Stand-off
Club
Years	Team	Pld	T	G	FG	P
1976–85	Leigh	302	135	859	11	2172
1985–87	Bradford Northern	62	21	167	3	421
1987–89	Warrington	72	25	254	5	613
1989–90	Rochdale Hornets	28	16	65	0	194
1990–92	Leigh	47	17	125	2	320
	Total	511	214	1470	21	3720
Representative
Years	Team	Pld	T	G	FG	P
1977–87	Lancashire	6	5	5	0	25
1977–79	Great Britain U24	5	2	11	0	28
1979–81	England	7	2	8	0	22
1979–87	Great Britain	11	1	13	0	29

Coaching information
Club
Years	Team	Gms	W	D	L	W%
1984–85	Leigh	36	11	2	23	31

John Woods (born 14 September 1956) is an English former professional rugby league footballer who played in the 1970s, 1980s and 1990s, and coached in the 1980s. He played at representative level for Great Britain and England, and at club level for Leigh (two spells), Bradford Northern, Warrington and Rochdale Hornets, as a goal-kicking fullback, centre, or stand-off, and coached at club level for Leigh.

== Playing career ==
=== County Cup Final appearances ===
John Woods played stand-off, and scored 2-goals in Leigh's 8–3 victory over Widnes in the 1981 Lancashire Cup Final during the 1981–82 season at Central Park, Wigan on Saturday 26 September 1981, and played stand-off, and scored 2-goals in Warrington's 16–28 defeat by Wigan in the 1987 Lancashire Cup Final during the 1987–88 season at Knowsley Road, St. Helens on Sunday 11 October 1987.

=== BBC2 Floodlit Trophy Final appearances ===
John Woods played at centre in Leigh's 4–12 defeat by Castleford in the 1976 BBC2 Floodlit Trophy Final during the 1976–77 season at Hilton Park, Leigh on Tuesday 14 December 1976.

=== Career records ===
John Woods holds Leigh's "Most Career Points" record with 2,492 points,. With 3,985-points he is sixth on British rugby league's "most points in a career" record list behind Neil Fox, Jim Sullivan, Kevin Sinfield, Gus Risman and Danny Brough.

=== International honours ===
John Woods won caps for England while at Leigh in 1979 against Wales (interchange/substitute), and France, in 1980 against Wales (interchange/substitute), and France, in 1981 against France, Wales, and Wales (interchange/substitute), and won caps for Great Britain while at Leigh in 1979 against Australia (3 matches), and New Zealand, in 1980 against New Zealand, in 1981 against France (2 matches), in 1982 against Australia, and Australia (interchange/substitute), in 1983 against France, and while at Warrington in 1987 against Papua New Guinea.

== Testimonial match ==
John Woods' Testimonial match at Leigh took place in 1984.
