= Jeff Grayshon =

Great Britain and England international rugby league footballer & coach (1949–2021)

Personal information
- Full name: Jeffrey Grayshon
- Born: 4 March 1949 Birstall, West Yorkshire, England
- Died: 21 March 2021 (aged 72)

Playing information
- Position: Fullback, Prop, Second-row, Loose forward
Club
| Years | Team | Pld | T | G | FG | P |
|---|---|---|---|---|---|---|
| 1970–78 | Dewsbury | 235+2 | 31 | 1 | 2 | 97 |
| 1977 | Cronulla Sharks | 8 | 0 | 0 | 0 | 0 |
| 1979–85 | Bradford Northern | 199+4 | 34 | 0 | 0 | 102 |
| 1985–87 | Leeds | 31+2 | 1 | 0 | 0 | 4 |
| 1987 | Bradford Northern | 15+3 | 0 | 0 | 0 | 0 |
| 1988–91 | Featherstone | 97+3 | 2 | 0 | 0 | 8 |
| 1991–95 | Batley | 69+35 | 2 | 0 | 0 | 8 |
| | Total | 703 | 70 | 1 | 2 | 219 |
Representative
| Years | Team | Pld | T | G | FG | P |
| 1975–81 | England | 10+1 | 2 | 0 | 0 | 6 |
| 1979–85 | Great Britain | 13 | 1 | 0 | 0 | 4 |
| 1973–85 | Yorkshire | 14 | 0 | 0 | 0 | 0 |
| 1979 | GB tour games | 6+3 | 1 | 0 | 0 | 3 |

Coaching information
Club
| Years | Team | Gms | W | D | L | W% |
| 1978 | Dewsbury |
| 1994–96 | Batley | 66 | 27 | 4 | 35 | 41 |
| | Total | 66 | 27 | 4 | 35 | 41 |

Jeffrey Grayshon MBE (4 March 1949 – 21 March 2021) was an English professional rugby league footballer who played in the 1970s, 1980s and 1990s, and coached in the 1990s. He played at representative level for Great Britain and England, and at club level for Dewsbury, Cronulla-Sutherland Sharks, Bradford Northern, Leeds, Featherstone Rovers and Batley, as a fullback, prop, second-row, or loose forward, and coached at club level for Batley. Grayshon continued playing until he was 45 for Batley before taking over as coach at Batley. Grayshon's biography The Warrior: Jeff Grayshon MBE was written by Maurice Bamford.

He died in 2021 from COVID-19.

== Playing career ==
=== Dewsbury ===
Grayshon played at second-row in Dewsbury's 22–13 victory over Leeds in the Championship final during the 1972–73 season at Odsal Stadium, Bradford on Saturday 19 May 1973.

He played at second-row in Dewsbury's 9–36 defeat by Leeds in the 1972–73 Yorkshire Cup final at Odsal Stadium, Bradford on Saturday 7 October 1972.

Grayshon played loose forward in Dewsbury's 2–22 defeat by St. Helens in the 1975 BBC2 Floodlit Trophy Final at Knowsley Road, St. Helens on Tuesday 16 December 1975.

=== Bradford Northern ===
Grayshon played at prop in Bradford Northern's 5–10 defeat by Castleford in the 1981–82 Yorkshire Cup final at Headingley Rugby Stadium, Leeds on Saturday 3 October 1981, played at prop in the 7–18 defeat by Hull F.C. in the 1982–83 Yorkshire Cup final at Elland Road, Leeds on Saturday 2 October 1982, and played at prop (replaced by substitute David Hobbs) in the 12–12 draw with Castleford in the 1987–88 Yorkshire Cup Final at Headingley on Saturday 17 October 1987 (he did not play in the replay).

He played at second-row in Bradford Northern's 6–0 victory over Widnes in the 1979–80 John Player Trophy final at Headingley on Saturday 5 January 1980.

=== Featherstone Rovers ===
Grayshon played at prop in Featherstone Rovers' 14–20 defeat by Bradford Northern in the 1989–90 Yorkshire Cup final at Headingley on Sunday 5 November 1989.

=== International honours ===
Grayshon won caps for England while at Dewsbury in the 1975 Rugby League World Cup against Wales, France, New Zealand, and Australia, in 1977 against Wales, while at Bradford Northern in 1979 against Wales, and France, in 1980 against Wales (sub), and France, in 1981 against Wales, and won caps for Great Britain while at Bradford Northern in 1979 against Australia (2 matches), and New Zealand (3 matches), in 1980 against New Zealand (2 matches), in 1981 against France (2 matches), in 1982 against Australia (2 matches), while at Leeds in 1985 against New Zealand (2 matches).

== Personal life ==
Grayshon is the father of the rugby league footballer Paul Grayshon who played in the 1980s and 1990s for Featherstone Rovers and Bradford Northern. Jeff played until he was 45, so long that he actually played against his son.
