= 1978–79 Northern Rugby Football League season =

- League: Northern Rugby Football League
- Champions: Hull Kingston Rovers
- Premiership: Leeds
- Man of Steel Award: Doug Laughton
- Top point-scorer: Sammy Lloyd (373)
- Top try-scorer: Steve Hartley (35)

Promotion and relegation
- Promoted from Second Division: Hull; New Hunslet; York; Blackpool Borough
- Relegated to Second Division: Barrow; Featherstone Rovers; Rochdale Hornets; Huddersfield

The 1978–79 Northern Rugby Football League season was the 84th season of rugby league football. Sixteen English clubs competed for the Northern Rugby Football League's first division championship, with Hull Kingston Rovers claiming the title by finishing on top of the League.

== Season summary ==
The 1978 Kangaroo tour took place during the first half of the season and involved matches between a number of clubs.

Hull Kingston Rovers won their third Championship this season.

The Challenge Cup Winners were Widnes who beat Wakefield Trinity 12-3 in the final.

2nd Division Champions were Hull F.C., with an impressive season, despite poor results in previous seasons. New Hunslet, York and Blackpool Borough were also promoted to the First Division.

Geoff 'Sammy' Lloyd of Hull F.C. equalled the club match record for scoring goals when he was successful 14 times in the match against Oldham on 10 September 1978. They were part of a club record 170 goals in a season, and a club record 369 points in a season.

== League Tables ==
=== Championship ===
Final Standings

	Team	Pld	W	D	L	PF	PA	Pts
1	Hull Kingston Rovers	30	23	0	7	616	344	46
2	Warrington	30	22	0	8	521	340	44
3	Widnes	30	21	2	7	480	322	44
4	Leeds	30	19	1	10	555	370	39
5	St. Helens	30	16	2	12	485	379	34
6	Wigan	30	16	1	13	484	411	33
7	Castleford	30	16	1	13	498	469	33
8	Bradford Northern	30	16	0	14	523	416	32
9	Workington Town	30	13	3	14	378	345	29
10	Wakefield Trinity	30	13	1	16	382	456	27
11	Leigh	30	13	1	16	406	535	27
12	Salford	30	11	2	17	389	435	24
13	Barrow	30	9	2	19	368	536	20
14	Featherstone Rovers	30	8	1	21	501	549	17
15	Rochdale Hornets	30	8	0	22	297	565	16
16	Huddersfield	30	7	1	22	314	725	15

=== Second Division ===
	Team	Pld	W	D	L	PF	PA	Pts
1	Hull	26	26	0	0	702	175	52
2	New Hunslet	26	21	1	4	454	218	43
3	York	26	17	1	8	426	343	35
4	Blackpool Borough	26	15	3	8	321	272	33
5	Halifax	26	15	2	9	312	198	32
6	Dewsbury	26	15	0	11	368	292	30
7	Keighley	26	12	2	12	357	298	26
8	Bramley	26	12	1	13	375	342	25
9	Oldham	26	10	1	15	297	435	21
10	Whitehaven	26	8	3	15	297	408	19
11	Swinton	26	7	2	17	349	452	16
12	Doncaster	26	7	0	19	259	547	14
13	Huyton	26	3	3	20	261	513	9
14	Batley	26	4	1	21	194	479	9

Champions	Play-offs	Promoted	Relegated

== Cups ==
=== Challenge Cup ===
Widnes beat Wakefield Trinity 12-3 in the State Express Challenge Cup Final played at Wembley Stadium, London on Saturday 5 May 1979, in front of a crowd of 94,218.

This was Widnes' fifth cup final win in seven Final appearances. To date, this was Wakefield Trinity’s last appearance in a Challenge Cup Final.

The Wakefield Trinity stand-off, David Topliss, won the Lance Todd Trophy.

=== Premiership ===
Rugby League Premiership Trophy Winners were Leeds who beat Bradford Northern 24-2 in the final.

=== County cups ===
Widnes beat Workington Town (from Cumbria) 15–13 to win the Lancashire County Cup, and Bradford Northern beat York 18–8 to win the Yorkshire County Cup.

=== BBC2 Floodlit Trophy ===
The BBC2 Floodlit Trophy Winners were Widnes who beat St. Helens 13-7 in the final.

== Statistics ==
The following are the top points scorers in the 1978–79 season.

Most tries

Player	Team	Tries
Steve Hartley	Hull Kingston Rovers	35
Stuart Wright	Widnes	28
David Barends	Bradford Northern	25
Phil Lowe	Hull Kingston Rovers	25
Paul Prendiville	Hull F.C.	25
Keith Fielding	Salford	24
David Redfearn	Bradford Northern	23
Roy Mathias	St. Helens	22
Graham Bray	Hull F.C.	21
Keiron O'Loughlin	Wigan	21
Clive Sullivan	Hull Kingston Rovers	21

Most goals (including drop goals)

Player	Team	Goals
Sammy Lloyd	Hull F.C.	172
Steve Hesford	Warrington	170
Mick Burke	Widnes	140
Iain McCorquodale	Workington Town	114
Geoff Pimblett	St. Helens	105
Graham Beale	Keighley	96
John Woods	Leigh	96
Jimmy Birts	Halifax	86
George Fairbairn	Wigan	86
Paul Norton	Castleford	82

== Kangaroo Tour ==
The months of September, October and November also saw the appearance of the Australian team in England on their 1978 Kangaroo Tour. Other than the three test Ashes series against Great Britain (won 2–1 by Australia), The Kangaroos played and won matches against 12 club and county representative sides as well as playing Wales in a non-test international.

The 1978 Kangaroos were coached by dual Manly-Warringah NSWRFL premiership coach Frank Stanton who had previously toured as a player in 1963–64. The team was captained by brilliant centre / stand-off Bob Fulton making his second tour after being a part of the 1973 squad.

The 11–10 loss to Widnes at Naughton Park on 25 October remains (as of 2017) the last time that the Kangaroos have lost to an English club or county team.

game	Date	Result	Venue	Attendance
1	30 September	Australia def. Blackpool Borough 39–1	Borough Park, Blackpool	2,700
2	1 October	Australia def. Cumbria 47–7	Craven Park, Barrow-in-Furness	5,964
3	4 October	Australia def. Great Britain U/24 30–8	Craven Park, Hull	6,418
4	8 October	Australia def. Bradford Northern 21–11	Odsal Stadium, Bradford	15,755
5	11 October	Australia def. Warrington 15–12	Wilderspool Stadium, Warrington	10,143
6	15 October	Australia def. Wales 8–3	St Helens Rugby Ground, Swansea	4,250
7	17 October	Australia def. Leeds 25–19	Headingley, Leeds	9,781
8	21 October	Australia def. Great Britain 15–9	Central Park, Wigan	17,644
9	25 October	Widnes def. Australia 11–10	Naughton Park, Widnes	12,202
10	29 October	Australia def. Hull F.C. 34–2	The Boulevard, Hull	10,723
11	1 November	Australia def. Salford 14–2	The Willows, Salford	6,155
12	5 November	Great Britain def. Australia 18–14	Odsal Stadium, Bradford	26,761
13	8 November	Australia def. Wigan 28–2	Central Park, Wigan	10,645
14	12 November	Australia def. St Helens 26–4	Knowsley Road, St Helens	16,352
15	14 November	Australia def. York 29–2	Clarence Street, York	5,155
16	18 November	Australia def. Great Britain 23–6	Headingley, Leeds	30,604

== Sources ==
- 1978-79 Rugby Football League season at wigan.rlfans.com
- The Challenge Cup at The Rugby Football League website
