= List of Featherstone Rovers players =

Featherstone Rovers are an English rugby league club. Everyone who played for the club between 1921 and 2016 has been allocated a sequential heritage number by the club, in order of their appearance. The list comprises 1,051 players.

== List of players ==
Last updated April 2025

No.	Name	Debut Season	Debut Date	Final Season	Position	Apps	Tries	Goals	DGs	Pts	Capt.	Honours	Representative	Records/Notes
1044	Jordan Abdull	2016	1 May 2016	2016	Stand-off	5	0	0	0	0				
1034	Mitch Achurch	2016	7 February 2016	2016	Prop/Second-row	3	0	0	0	0				
555	Martin Addison	1978–79	3 December 1978	1978–79		1	0	0	0	0				
1163	Danny Addy	2024	28 January 2024	present	Loose forward	31	9	29	0	94				
903	Ade Adebisi	2007	8 July 2007	2007	Fullback, Wing	11	5	0	0	20				
1150	Caleb Aekins	2023	6 February 2023	present	Fullback	57	32	0	0	92			(Wales)	
483	Allan Agar	1967–68	15 April 1968	1968–69	Half-back	4	0	0	0	0				
447	Fred Agar	1964–65	7 November 1964	1967–68	Second-row	13	2	17	0 ^²	40				
823	Richard Agar	2002	16 June 2002	2003		23	4	1	2	20				
1193	Sitaleki Akauola	2025	25 January 2025	present	Prop	3	3	0	0	12				
1101	Wellington Albert	2019	5 June 2019	2024	Prop	37	3	0	0	12				Two spells with the club
43	Ernest Alder	1923–24	8 September 1923	1923–24	Fullback	1	0	0	0	0				
936	Danny Allan	2010	14 February 2010	2010	Stand-off	6	1	0	0	4				
559	William Allan	1979–80	21 October 1979	1979–80	Centre, Wing	1	0	0	0	0				
769	Chris Allen	1998	8 February 1998	1998	Winger	2	0	0	0	0				On loan from Castleford
60	John Allen	1924–25	29 October 1924	1924–25	Stand-off	3	0	0	0	0				Occasionally misnamed Joseph Allen
340	Tony Allen	1952–53	13 December 1952	1955–56	Fullback	20	0	19	0 ^²	38				
263	Bill Allinson	1946–47	1 January 1947	1948–49	Second-row	72	5	0	0	15				Club captain 1948/49
196	Dick Allman	1941–42	6 September 1941	1949–50	Stand-off	164	32	4	0 ^²	104				
302	Derek Altass	1948–49	5 March 1949	1950–51	Winger	64	10	0	0	30				Served in Paras in WW2, captured at Arnham and made POW. Rejoined Paras 1951
765	Asa Amone	1998	1 February 1998	1999	Second-row, Prop	60	4	0	0	16				
369	Colin Anderson	1955–56	7 April 1956	1957–58	Second-row	15	1	0	0	3				Brother of Jack
417	Jack Anderson	1960–61	19 April 1961	1963–64	Fullback	18	0	14	0 ^²	28				Brother of Colin
395	Joe Anderson	1958–59	20 August 1958	1960–61	Prop	47	0	0	0	0				
547	Kevin Anderson	1977–78	27 March 1978	1981–82	Prop	51	3	1	0	11				Nephew of Colin & Jack
35	Lionel Anderson	1921–22	8 April 1922	1932–33	Fullback	1	0	0	0	0				Father of Colin & Jack, grandfather of Kevin
36b	Percy Anderson	1922–23	21 September 1922	1922–23	Centre	8	3	0	0	9				
738	Simon Angell	1995–96	17 December 1995	1996	Prop	7	0	0	0	0				
58	Charles "Charlie" Annable	1924–25	27 September 1924	1931–32	Halfback	196	29	2	0 ^²	91			(Yorkshire)	Born in Wakefield
999	Chris Annakin	2014	11 May 2014	2014	Prop	11	3	0	0	12				On loan from Wakefield Trinity
690	Darren Appleby	1992–93	6 September 1992	1992–93	Scrum-half	1	0	0	0	0				
271	Harold Arblaster	1946–47	26 May 1947	1947–48	Scrum-half	2	1	0	0	3				
826	Ben Archibald	2003	19 January 2003	2004	Fullback	14	2	0	0	8				
313	Douglas Armitage	1949–50	7 January 1950	1957–58	Centre	1	0	0	0	0				
366b	Ron Armitage	1955-56	17 March 1956	1955-56	Centre	2	0	0	0	0				
1164	Jack Arnold	2024	28 January 2024	present	Prop	13	1	0	0	4				
1019	Joe Arundel	2015	8 March 2015	2015	Centre	1	1	0	0	4				On Dual-Reg from Hull FC
730	Stuart Arundel	1995–96	10 September 1995	1995–96	Centre	2	0	0	0	0				
61	Jack Ashton	1924–25	29 November 1924	1928–29	Loose forward	123	36	0	0	108				Born in Featherstone, from Batley in 1924
276	Ramsey Ashton	1947–48	1 November 1947	1947–48	Scrum-half	6	0	0	0	0				
1147	Jack Ashworth	2022	26 June 2022	2022	Prop	2	0	0	0	0				On loan from Huddersfield Giants
159	Ambrose Askin	1937–38	15 January 1938	1938–39	Second-row	14	0	0	0	0				Injuries sustained at Dunkirk in 1940 put an end to his playing career
283	Lawrence Askin	1947–48	31 January 1948	1947–48	Winger	3	0	0	0	0				
64	Tom Askin	1924–25	21 March 1925	1938–39	Centre	130	45	1	0 ^²	137			(United Kingdom) (Yorkshire)	Born in Knottingley
161	Septimus Aspinall	1938–39	27 August 1938	1938–39	Loose forward	20	3	0	0	9				Known as Sep Aspinall
122	Ralph Asquith	1933–34	11 October 1933	1938–39	Winger	158	43	2	0 ^²	133				
1161	Logan Astley	2023	2 July 2023	2023	Scrum-half	3	0	0	0	0				On loan from Wigan Warriors
1060	Cory Aston	2017	5 March 2017	2017	Scrum-half	12	4	49	1	115				On loan from Leeds Rhinos. Son of Mark Aston
709	Mark Aston	1994–95	21 August 1994	1995–96	Scrum-half	35	6	85	2	196	(c)			
507	Anthony Atha	1971–72	25 September 1971	1971–72	Prop	6	0	0	0	0				
256	Joe Atherton	1946–47	2 November 1946	1946–47	Loose forward	12	0	0	0	0				
581	Mick Atherton	1982–83	2 January 1983	1982–83	Prop	3	0	0	0	0				On loan from Bradford Northern
338	Tony Atkins	1952–53	27 September 1952	1952–53	Stand-off	7	1	0	0	3				
294	G. Atkinson	1948–49	13 November 1948	1948–49	Prop	1	0	0	0	0				
1158	Yusuf Aydin	2023	7 April 2023	2024	Prop	5	0	0	0	0				On loan from Hull KR
268	Albert Ayre	1946–47	29 March 1947	1946–47	Winger	1	0	0	0	0				Left to join the Royal Navy
209	Dennis Baddeley	1942–43	17 April 1943	1942–43	Centre	1	0	0	0	0				War-time guest player from Wakefield Trinity
827	Andy Bailey	2003	19 January 2003	2003	Second-row	25	1	0	0	4				
653	Howard Bailey	1987–88	6 March 1988	1987–88	Winger	5	0	0	0	0				
494	David Bailey-Lee	1969–70	14 March 1970	1972–73	Winger	34	12	0	0	36				
747	Danny Baker	1997	26 January 1997	1998	Second-row	59	31	0	0	124				Australian, signed from Canberra Raiders
1009	Jordan Baldwinson	2015	16 February 2015	2015	Prop	33	1	0	0	4				Two loan spells from Leeds Rhinos
502	Greg Ballantyne	1970–71	28 November 1970	1970–71	Winger	4	0	0	0	0				On loan from Hull KR
642	Mick Bamford	1986–87	20 April 1987	1986–87	Prop	1	0	0	0	0				
574	Alan Banks	1981–82	28 April 1982	1990–91	Wing, Stand-off	233	47	0	0	186		CC		two 3-point tries, and forty-five 4-point tries
471	Steven Banks	1966–67	3 December 1966	1966–67	Second-row	1	0	0	0	0				
535	Peter Banner	1975–76	28 September 1975	1975–76	Scrum-half	21	1	0	0	3			(Wales)	
212	… Bannister	1943–44	2 October 1943	1943–44	Winger	3	0	0	0	0				
651	Andy Bannister	1987–88	22 November 1987	1987–88	Winger	4	3	0	0	12				
710	Frédéric Banquet	1994–95	21 August 1994	1995–96	Winger	20	15	17	0	94			(France)	
586	Joe Bardgett	1983–84	21 August 1983	1983–84	Winger	28	3	0	0	12				
591	David Barends	1983–84	18 September 1983	1983–84	Winger	25	6	0	0	24				South African
746	Lee Bargate	1996	25 August 1996	1997	Winger	10	2	0	0	8				
476	Ron Barham	1966–67	28 March 1967	1966–67	Fullback	1	0	0	0	0				
621	Alan Barker	1985–86	19 January 1986	1986–87	Prop	13	0	0	0	0				
931	Dwayne Barker	2009	1 August 2009	2009	Centre	5	1	0	0	4				
99	George Barker	1930–31	25 March 1931	1933–34	Winger	73	21	1	0 ^²	65				
568	Nigel Barker	1980–81	25 January 1981	1988–89	Fullback	199	28	0	0	100		CC		Twelve 3-point tries, and sixteen 4-point tries, Testimonial match 1992
571	Peter Barker	1981–82	8 November 1981	1981–82	Second-row	2	0	0	0	0				
548	Steve Barker	1977–78	27 March 1978	1983–84	Scrum-half	15	4	0	1	13				
158	Billy Barker	1937–38	1 January 1938	1938–39	Centre	21	3	0	0	9				
1181	Connor Barley	2024	28 April 2024	2024	Centre	8	2	0	0	8				On DR loan from Hull KR
986	Sam Barlow	2013	28 July 2013	2013	Prop	9	1	0	0	4				
805	Gary Barnett	2001	3 December 2000	2001	Stand-off	9	0	0	0	0				
610	Justin Barr	1984–85	20 March 1985	1984–85	Fullback	5	0	0	0	0				Australian
247	Alvin Barraclough	1945–46	5 January 1946	1946–47	Centre	19	7	9	0 ^²	39				Occasionally misnamed Alfred Barraclough
1	Ernest Barraclough	1921–22	27 August 1921	1933–34	Prop	435	23	0	0	69			(Yorkshire)	Born in Ryhill
100	Fred Barraclough	1930–31	29 April 1931	1930–31	Second-row	1	0	0	0	0				Cousin of Ernest
220	Irvin Barraclough	1943–44	5 February 1944	1947–48	Fullback	57	1	80	0 ^²	163				
1079	James Barraclough	2018	7 October 2018	2018	Prop	1	0	0	0	0				On loan from Leeds Rhinos academy
358	Jim Barraclough	1954–55	4 December 1954	1956–57	Second-row	53	4	0	0	12				
277	John Barraclough	1947–48	15 November 1947	1947–48	Hooker	1	0	0	0	0				
367	Len Barraclough	1955–56	24 March 1956	1957–58	Fullback	4	0	0	0	0				
401	Malcolm Barraclough	1958–59	25 December 1958	1963–64	Second-row	9	0	0	0	0				
376	Peter Barraclough	1956–57	15 December 1956	1956–57	Hooker	6	0	0	0	0				
648	John Bastian	1987–88	25 October 1987	1991–92	Prop	60	4	0	0	16				Head coach 2013-14
800	Andy Bastow	2000	23 January 2000	2002	Stand-off	83	17	0	1	69				
413	Colin Bates	1960–61	28 September 1960	1964–65	Stand-off	7	3	0	0	9				
178	Eric Batten	1939–40	2 December 1939	1954–55	Winger	105	62	0	0	186	(c)			
843	Nathan Batty	2004	1 February 2004	2008	Fullback	51	12	0	0	48				
720	Neil Battye	1994–95	22 January 1995	1994–95	Prop	1	0	0	0	0				On loan from Castleford
205	Leslie Baxter	1942–43	14 November 1942	1942–43	Second-row	1	0	0	0	0				War-time guest player from Hull FC
646	Danny Beach	1987–88	4 October 1987	1988–89	Winger	18	1	0	0	4				
232	… Beal	1944–45	26 December 1944	1944–45	Prop	1	0	0	0	0				War-time guest player
1096	Jimmy Beckett	2019	31 March 2019	present	Second-row	15	3	0	0	12				
246	Sam Bedford	1945–46	29 December 1945	1945–46	Prop	10	0	0	0	0				
274	Dick Belfield	1947–48	4 October 1947	1948–49	Winger	4	1	0	0	3				
155	Alvan Bell	1937–38	23 October 1937	1938–39	Centre	11	2	0	0	6				
660	Glenn Bell	1988–89	4 December 1988	1989–90	Prop	34	3	0	0	12				
928	Ian Bell	2009	17 May 2009	2009	Centre	2	4	0	0	16				
152	Jimmy Bell	1937–38	18 September 1937	1938–39	Stand-off	4	1	0	0	3				Father of Roy, John, Peter & Keith Bell; all Featherstone players
463	John Bell	1965–66	11 April 1966	1969–70	Utility back	22	0	3	0	6				
509	Keith Bell	1971–72	28 November 1971	1989–90	Loose forward	417	57	7	67	265	(c)		(Yorkshire)	Forty-four 3-point tries, and thirteen 4-point tries
438	Peter Bell	1963–64	7 March 1964	1978–79	Stand-off	23	0	1	0	2				
387	Roy Bell	1957–58	23 November 1957	1960–61	Stand-off	40	15	0	0	45				
557	Alan Bence	1978–79	3 February 1979	1979–80	Prop	20	1	0	0	3				
887	Jamie Benn	2006	23 July 2006	2007	Fullback	16	1	7	1	19			(Scotland)	
449	Bill Bennett	1964–65	13 March 1965	1965–66	Stand-off	5	0	0	0	0				
250	Dave Bennett	1945–46	26 January 1946	1946–47	Stand-off	29	3	1	0 ^²	11				
997	Gavin Bennion	2014	4 May 2014	2014	Prop	1	0	0	0	0				On loan from Warrington Wolves
190	Lol Berry	1940–41	9 November 1940	1940–41	Winger	1	0	0	0	0				War-time guest player
345	Rowland "Ron" Berry	1952–53	27 April 1953	1955–56	Second-row	29	2	0	0	6				
284	Walter Best	1947–48	7 February 1948	1948–49	Winger	28	5	0	0	15	(c)			
616	Chris Bibb	1985–86	3 November 1985	1996	Fullback	248	79	6	0	328			(United Kingdom) (Yorkshire)	
816	Sam Bibb	2002	2 December 2001	2002	Prop	3	0	0	0	0				On loan from Bradford Bulls
332	Dennis Binks	1951–52	22 March 1952	1956–57	Second-row	12	4	0	0	12				
886	Chris Birchall	2006	9 July 2006	2006	Second-row	10	1	0	0	4				
429	Frank Birchill	1962–63	29 September 1962	1962–63	Second-row	1	0	0	0	0				
334	Alwyn Blackburn	1951–52	22 April 1952	1952–53	Centre	2	0	0	0	0				
180	Jack Blackburn	1939–40	16 December 1939	1952–53	Winger	139	30	38	0 ^²	166				
1004	Ben Blackmore	2014	8 June 2014	2014	Winger	54	39	0	0	156				Two spells with the club
73	Harold Blakeley	1927–28	17 March 1928	1928–29	Prop	18	0	0	0	0				
844	Richard Blakeway	2004	1 February 2004	2009	Loose forward	117	31	20	5	169				
1042	Liam Blockley	2016	19 March 2016	2016	Centre	6	0	0	0	0				
1082	Ase Boas	2019	3 February 2019	2019	Stand-off	5	1	2	0	8				
1083	Watson Boas	2019	3 February 2019	2019	Scrum-half	10	4	14	0	44			(Papua New Guinea)	
295	Roy Bolton	1948–49	20 November 1948	1951–52	Prop	61	3	0	0	9				
231	… Bonas	1944–45	16 December 1944	1944–45	Stand-off	2	0	0	0	0				War-time guest player
235	Jack Bond	1944–45	24 March 1945	1945–46	Scrum-half	9	0	1	0 ^²	2				
689	Paul Bonson	1991–92	26 January 1992	1993–94	Prop	6	0	0	0	0				Gave up rugby to continue a boxing career
687	Craig Booth	1991–92	20 October 1991	2002	Prop	63	2	5	0	18				
659	Glen Booth	1988–89	9 October 1988	1991–92	Second-row	34	4	0	0	16				
342	Walter Booth	1952–53	3 January 1953	1952–53	Loose forward	1	0	0	0	0				
364	Alan Boothroyd	1955–56	2 November 1955	1959–60	Second-row	5	0	0	0	0				
1194	Toby Boothroyd	2025	25 January 2025	present	Second-row	2	1	0	0	4				Australian
948	Andy Bostock	2011	4 February 2011	2014	Prop	155	44	0	0	176				
172	Jim Bowden	1938–39	29 April 1939	1945–46	Hooker	84	1	46	0 ^²	95				
19	Matty Bowen	1921–22	1 October 1921	1921–22	Fullback	4	0	0	0	0				
890	Craig Bower	2007	11 February 2007	2007	Fullback	6	1	0	0	4				Australian
1165	Harry Bowes	2024	28 January 2024	2024	Hooker	25	1	0	0	4				
493	Harold Box	1969–70	17 January 1970	1979–80	Fullback	283	57	476	0	1123			(Wales) (Yorkshire)	
641	Paddy Bradford	1986–87	14 April 1987	1987–88	Prop	3	0	0	0	0				
88	Bernard Bradley	1929–30	12 October 1929	1930–31	Loose forward	21	0	0	0	0				Tragically killed in a roof collapse at Ackton Hall Colliery in 1948 aged 41
355	Ron Bradley	1954–55	11 September 1954	1958–59	Second-row	38	8	0	0	24				
327	...	...	...	...										Unallocated
217	Bill Bradshaw	1943–44	18 December 1943	1956–57	Hooker	70	0	0	0	0				Occasionally misnamed Arthur Bradshaw
787	Matt Bramald	1999	31 January 1999	2002	Winger	123	65	0	0	260				
873	Dominic Brambani	2005	24 July 2005	2005	Scrum-half/Stand-off	7	1	0	0	4				
279	John Bramley	1947–48	13 December 1947	1948–49	Prop	14	0	0	0	0				
145	Arthur Bratley	1936–37	31 October 1936	1936–37	Second-row	16	0	0	0	0				Older brother of Len Bratley
510	Graham Bray	1971–72	1 January 1972	1976–77	Winger	69	18	0	0	54				
228	… Brear	1944–45	14 October 1944	1944–45	Hooker	1	0	0	0	0				War-time guest player
1002	Danny Bridge	2014	1 June 2014	2014	Second-row	4	2	0	0	8				On loan from Warrington Wolves
497	John Keith Bridges	1970–71	26 August 1970	1978–79	Hooker	235	44	5	3	145		CC	(United Kingdom) (England) (Yorkshire)	
828	Carl Briggs	2003	19 January 2003	2004	Scrum-half	45	6	87	8	206				
929	Kyle Briggs	2009	24 May 2009	2014	Stand-off	122	56	199	2	624				Four separate spells with the club, one was on loan from Bradford
198	Reginald Brightmore	1941–42	13 September 1941	1944–45	Winger	46	15	0	0	45				
972	Jack Briscoe	2012	19 May 2012	2012	Winger	9	5	0	0	20				
1046	Luke Briscoe	2016	15 May 2016	2023	Winger/Centre	126	94	0	0	376				
1097	Jack Broadbent	2019	31 March 2019	2022	Winger	15	10	0	0	40				Two loan spells from Leeds Rhinos
141	Edward Brogden	1935–36	30 November 1935	1936–37	Winger	42	5	25	0 ^²	65				
236	Ken Brookes	1944–45	14 April 1945	1950–51	Utility back	21	1	0	0	3				Two spells; the first was as a war-time guest
1063	Sam Brooks	2017	22 July 2017	2018	Prop	38	2	0	0	8			(Scotland)	
405	Eric Broom	1958–59	29 April 1959	1963–64	Centre	51	10	3	0 ^²	36				
67	William Broom	1926–27	11 September 1926	1928–29	Winger	31	7	0	0	21				
1121	Fa'amanu Brown	2021	21 March 2021	2021	Stand-off	27	17	12	0	92				
433	Harry Brown	1963–64	17 September 1963	1969–70	Loose forward	23	5	0	0	15				
829	Ian Brown	2003	19 January 2003	2003	Centre	25	14	0	0	56				
1184	Jack Brown	2024	2 June 2024	2024	Prop	1	0	0	0	0				On DR loan from Hull KR
974	Lamont Bryan	2013	3 February 2013	2013	Prop	24	6	0	0	24			(Jamaica)	
670	David Bugg	1989–90	15 October 1989	1990–91	Second-row	2	0	0	0	0				
56	Thomas Bugg	1924–25	13 September 1924	1924–25	Winger	2	0	0	0	0				
229	… Bulmer	1944–45	11 November 1944	1944–45	Stand-off	4	1	0	0	3				
51	Frank Burdin	1923–24	15 January 1924	1931–32	Second-row	9	0	0	0	0				
612	Patrick Burgoyne	1985–86	6 October 1985	1985–86	Prop	8	0	0	0	0				New Zealander
20	Sidney Burridge	1921–22	8 October 1921	1921–22	Fullback	4	0	0	0	0				
49	Albert Burton	1923–24	25 December 1923	1923–24	Fullback	13	0	0	0	0				
661	Chris Burton	1988–89	15 January 1989	1993–94	Second-row	130	5	0	0	20				
645	Dave Busby	1987–88	27 September 1987	1988–89	Second-row	2	0	0	0	0				
514	David "Dave" Busfield	1972–73	22 October 1972	1977–78	Loose forward	85	28	0	0	84				
968	Jack Bussey	2012	11 March 2012	2024	Loose forward	158	40	13	0	186				Two spells with the club
151	Peter Butcher	1937–38	6 September 1937	1938–39	Winger	26	1	0	0	3				Left due to WW2, joined the army
525	Phil Butler	1974–75	12 October 1974	1981–82	Scrum-half	78	11	0	8	41				
679	Ikram Butt	1990–91	26 August 1990	1994–95	Winger	168	66	0	0	264			(England)	
686	Tony Butt	1991–92	13 October 1991	1991–92	Prop	2	0	0	0	0				
1180	Reiss Butterworth	2024	21 April 2024	2024	Hooker	2	0	0	0	0				On DR loan from Hull KR
797	Shane Byrne	2000	3 January 2000	2000	Stand-off	1	0	0	0	0				On loan from Huddersfield Giants
705	Matt Calland	1993–94	14 November 1993	1995–96	Centre	45	27	0	0	108				
618	Mark Campbell	1985–86	17 November 1985	1987–88	Utility forward	20	0	0	1	1				Chairman in 2009
852	Dale Cardoza	2004	9 May 2004	2007	Centre	38	13	0	0	52				
1084	Conor Carey	2019	3 February 2019	2020	Centre	30	11	0	0	44				Australian
657	Phil Carey	1988–89	25 September 1988	1988–89	Centre	5	0	0	0	0				Australian
1052	Keal Carlile	2017	5 February 2017	2018	Hooker	65	8	0	0	32				Born in Pontefract
817	Jim Carlton	2002	2 December 2001	2006	Second-row	81	3	0	0	12				
402	Derek Carr	1958–59	4 April 1959	1961–62	Prop	8	0	0	0	0				
943	Thomas Carr	2010	4 March 2010	2012	Winger	5	2	0	0	8				
40	Albert Cartwright	1922–23	3 February 1923	1929–30	Winger	86	34	0	0	102				Born in Featherstone
31	David Cartwright	1921–22	11 February 1922	1922–23	Loose forward	10	0	0	0	0				
1025	Garreth Carvell	2015	26 April 2015	2015	Prop	5	0	0	0	0				
680	Leo Casey	1990–91	26 August 1990	1995–96	Prop	147	9	0	0	36			(Republic of Ireland)	
63	Harry Cavill	1924–25	7 March 1925	1924–25	Prop	1	0	0	0	0				
898	Craig Cawthray	2007	31 March 2007	2008	Second-row	4	2	0	0	8				
1035	Michael Channing	2016	7 February 2016	2016	Centre	12	2	0	0	8			(Wales)	Born in Guildford
147	Colin Chapman	1936–37	2 January 1937	1936–37	Scrum-half	5	2	0	0	6				
206	Herbert Chapman	1942–43	14 November 1942	1946–47	Fullback	63	7	2	0	25				
748	Richard Chapman	1997	26 January 1997	2004	Hooker	240	104	128	3	675	(c)			Born in Featherstone
588	Tony Chapman	1983–84	4 September 1983	1987–88	Winger	18	3	0	0	12				
615	Christopher Chappell	1985–86	27 October 1985	1985–86	Winger	6	0	0	0	0				
957	Nathan Chappell	2011	1 May 2011	2012	Centre	25	20	0	0	80				
414	Barry Charlesworth	1960–61	3 December 1960	1960–61	Winger	19	11	0	0	33				
775	Lee Child	1998	5 April 1998	1998	Winger	9	3	0	0	12			(Republic of Ireland)	
1099	Dane Chisholm	2019	19 April 2019	2023	Scrum-half	54	28	146	4	408				Three separate spells; first on loan from Bradford Bulls in 2019
993	Jamel Chisholm	2014	23 February 2014	2014	Winger	1	1	0	0	4				
293	Fred Church	1948–49	16 October 1948	1951–52	Stand-off	64	10	2	0 ^²	34				
347	Mick Clamp	1953–54	19 August 1953	1959–60	Centre	210	80	4	0 ^²	248			English League XIII	Younger brother of Terry Clamp (Wakefield Trinity)
1065	Mitch Clark	2018	4 February 2018	2018	Prop	11	2	0	0	8				On loan from Castleford Tigers. Son of Trevor Clark
656	Trevor Clark	1988–89	18 September 1988	1991–92	Hooker	125	30	0	0	120				To Bradford Northern 1992
365	Colin Clarkson	1955–56	31 December 1955	1958–59	Winger	19	6	0	0	18				
598	Geoff Clarkson	1983–84	30 October 1983	1983–84	Second-row	13	0	0	0	0				
779	Michael Clarkson	1998	5 May 1998	2001	Prop	63	10	0	0	40				
592	Peter Clarkson	1983–84	16 October 1983	1986–87	Second-row	38	3	0	0	12				
554	Neil Clawson	1978–79	4 November 1978	1985–86	Prop	62	6	0	0	24				
390	Terry Clawson	1957–58	28 December 1957	1978–79	Prop	215	41	483	0	1089	(c)		(United Kingdom) (Yorkshire)	Two spells 1957-65 & 1978
444	Bren Clayton	1964–65	10 October 1964	1964–65	Centre	7	0	0	0	0				
2	Billy Clements	1921–22	27 August 1921	1927–28	Second-row	176	33	12	0 ^²	123			(Yorkshire)	Born in Featherstone, Featherstone Rover's first Yorkshire representative, Castleford coach 1930-32
407	Colin Clifft	1959–60	28 November 1959	1964–65	Loose forward	118	14	0	0	42	(vc)			
481	Barry Clixby	1967–68	26 January 1968	1967–68	Centre	1	0	0	0	0				
876	Lee Close	2006	12 February 2006	2006	Winger	3	0	0	0	0				
937	Michael Coady	2010	14 February 2010	2010	Centre	7	2	0	0	8				On loan from Leeds
961	Ben Cockayne	2011	21 July 2011	2011	Winger	9	11	0	0	44				
766	Steve Collins	1998	1 February 1998	1998	Fullback	32	22	0	0	88				Australian
897	Dean Colton	2007	18 March 2007	2007	Winger	19	6	0	0	24				
1030	Paul Cooke	2015	28 June 2015	2015	Stand-off	10	2	0	0	8				Head coach 2025
396	Gary Cooper	1958–59	20 August 1958	1965–66	Winger	191	43	9	0 ^²	147	(c)			
1026	Luke Cooper	2015	17 May 2015	2023	Prop	152	11	2	0	48				
410	Ian Corban	1959–60	16 April 1960	1960–61	Hooker	5	0	0	0	0				
262	Eric Cording	1946–47	25 December 1946	1946–47	Prop	1	0	0	0	0				
988	Jamie Cording	2014	16 February 2014	2016	Second-row	64	21	0	0	84				
316	Ray Cording	1950–51	30 August 1950	1955–56	Winger	140	34	10	0 ^²	122				
424	Keith Cotton	1961–62	4 November 1961	1972–73	Centre	165	20	0	0	60		CC		Head coach 1976-77
138	Frederick Coulson	1935–36	7 September 1935	1936–37	Prop	48	2	1	0 ^²	8				
858	Steve Coulson	2004	29 August 2004	2005	Prop	2	0	0	0	0				
1033	Jack Coventry	2015	23 August 2015	2016	Prop	7	1	0	0	4				
776	Jamie Coventry	1998	5 April 1998	2004	Utility back	76	12	0	0	48				
498	Paul Coventry	1970–71	19 September 1970	1982–83	Winger	301	86	0	0	258		CC		
1151	Mathieu Cozza	2023	6 February 2023	2023	Prop	22	4	0	0	16			(France)	
251	Tommy Crabtree	1945–46	26 January 1946	1949–50	Winger	90	25	0	0	75				
1036	Danny Craven	2016	7 February 2016	2016	Fullback	24	8	5	1	43				On loan from Widnes Vikings
1005	Jason Crookes	2014	8 June 2014	2014	Winger	15	14	0	0	56				
634	John Crossley	1986–87	23 November 1986	1988–89	Stand-off	66	18	0	0	72				
225	Samuel Crossley	1944–45	9 September 1944	1944–45	Prop	6	0	0	0	0				
975	Steve Crossley	2013	3 February 2013	2014	Prop	58	9	0	0	36				
877	Steven Crouch	2006	12 February 2006	2006	Second-row	10	0	0	0	0				
142	Uriah Crummack	1935–36	29 February 1936	1935–36	Fullback	6	0	0	0	0				
711	Andy Currier	1994–95	21 August 1994	1994–95	Centre	11	3	1	0	14				
1138	Adam Cuthbertson	2022	7 February 2022	2022	Prop	13	1	0	0	4				
1106	Will Dagger	2019	30 June 2019	2021	Winger	9	2	3	0	14				Two loan spells from Hull KR
576	Alan Dakin	1982–83	22 August 1982	1989–90	Prop	51	3	0	0	12				
904	Matty Dale	2007	15 July 2007	2014	Second-row	166	54	0	0	216				Two separate spells
326	John Daly	1951–52	22 September 1951	1952–53	Prop	46	1	0	0	3			Other Nationalities	
450	Howard Darbyshire	1964–65	17 April 1965	1969–70	Fullback	21	1	24	0 ^²	51				
194	Jack Darbyshire	1940–41	1 March 1941	1941–42	Stand-off	7	3	0	0	9				
808	Paul Darley	2001	17 December 2000	2004	Utility forward	106	7	0	0	28			(Republic of Ireland)	
398	Brian Darlington	1958–59	27 September 1958	1958–59	Winger	2	0	0	0	0				
270	Geoffrey Darlison	1946–47	17 May 1947	1949–50	Winger	10	0	0	0	0				
85	Oliver Darlison	1928–29	2 April 1929	1933–34	Forward	121	11	2	0 ^²	37				Born in Featherstone
144	Vic Darlison	1935–36	14 April 1936	1944–45	Hooker, Loose-forward	52	2	0	0	6				
692	Brett Daunt	1992–93	27 September 1992	1993–94	Scrum-half	61	18	0	0	72				
793	Maea David	2000	27 December 1999	2000	Prop	25	0	0	0	0				
153	William "Billy" J. Davies	1937–38	2 October 1937	1938–39	Centre	23	1	0	0	3				
885	Gareth "Gaz" Davies	2006	18 June 2006	2006	Winger	4	2	0	0	8				From Sharlston, not Gareth Davies (rugby league)
458	Gwynn Davies	1965–66	20 November 1965	1965–66	Stand-off	2	0	0	0	0				Not ex-Wigan Gwyn Davies, but brother of Alan Davies
1037	John Davies	2016	7 February 2016	2017	Second-row	182	45	2	0	184				
162	Lou Davies	1938–39	27 August 1938	1941–42	Centre	48	8	3	0 ^²	30				
674	Richard Davies	1989–90	10 December 1989	1989–90	Centre	4	0	0	0	0				
336	Derek Davis	1952–53	30 August 1952	1955–56	Second-row	39	7	32	0 ^²	85				
275	Eddie Davis	1947–48	25 October 1947	1949–50	Centre	36	2	6	0 ^²	18				
436	Stan Dawson	1963–64	22 February 1964	1968–69	Fullback	33	2	0	0	6				
1085	Brad Day	2019	3 February 2019	present	Second-row	89	39	0	0	156				Two stints 2019-21 & 2023-present
1027	Sam Day	2015	17 May 2015	2017	Hooker	15	3	0	0	12				
780	Craig Dean	1998	5 July 1998	1998	Stand-off	2	0	0	0	0				
72	James Dean	1927–28	3 March 1928	1927–28	Second-row	2	0	0	0	0				
1152	Riley Dean	2023	6 February 2023	2023	Scrum-half	11	5	23	0	66				On loan from Warrington Wolves
951	Dominic Dee	2011	13 February 2011	2011	Prop	4	0	0	0	0				On loan from Hull KR
1059	Brett Delaney	2017	26 February 2017	2017	Second-row	1	0	0	0	0				On DR loan from Leeds Rhinos
128	Jack Dennis	1933–34	30 March 1934	1933–34	Centre	1	0	0	0	0				
124	Tom Dennis	1933–34	3 February 1934	1937–38	Fullback	86	10	12	0	54				
647	Alan Denson	1987–88	18 October 1987	1987–88	Back	1	0	0	0	0				
3	Jim Denton	1921–22	27 August 1921	1933–34	Winger	440	130	377	0	1144			(Yorkshire)	Born in Thornes, Wakefield, brother of Sid Denton
4	Sid Denton	1921–22	27 August 1921	1932–33	Fullback	349	28	7	0	98				Born in Thornes, Wakefield, brother of Jim Denton
296	Jim Derry	1948–49	20 November 1948	1949–50	Scrum-half	5	0	0	0	0				
252	Joseph Desborough	1945–46	26 January 1946	1946–47		3	0	0	0	0				
186	Arthur Dexter	1939–40	13 April 1940	1941–42	Second-row	3	0	0	0	0				
774	Stuart Dickens	1998	15 March 1998	2012	Prop	421	71	632	2	1550	(c)			
712	Daniel Divet	1994–95	21 August 1994	1994–95	Second-row	28	8	0	0	32			(France)	
930	Ross Divorty	2009	13 June 2009	2011	Loose forward	63	14	0	0	56			(Wales)	
385	Malcolm Dixon	1957–58	28 September 1957	1974–75	Prop	320	47	41	0 ^²	223	(c)+(vc)	CC	(United Kingdom) (England) (Yorkshire)	
932	Aaron Dobek	2009	16 August 2009	2010	Scrum-half	5	2	11	0	30				
878	Richard Dobson	2006	12 February 2006	2006	Hooker	6	0	0	0	0				
415	Carl Dooler	1960–61	3 December 1960	1968–69	Scrum-half	199	62	15	0 ^²	216		CC	(Yorkshire)	
5	Harry Dooler	1921–22	27 August 1921	1921–22	Hooker	11	0	0	0	0				
778	Steve Dooler	1998	10 April 1998	2008	Second-row	270	56	0	0	224				
45	Harry Doran	1923–24	19 September 1923	1923–24	Second-row	1	0	0	0	0				
614	Scott Dorrough	1985–86	13 October 1985	1985–86	Second-row	2	0	0	0	0				
603	Craig Downs	1984–85	30 September 1984	1985–86	Second-row	2	0	0	0	0				
556	David Downs	1978–79	10 December 1978	1979–80	Second-row	1	0	0	0	0				
1128	Jacob Doyle	2021	23 May 2021	2021	Winger	3	4	0	0	16				
667	Barry Drummond	1989–90	17 September 1989	1989–90	Winger	14	2	0	0	8				
1048	James Duckworth	2016	19 June 2016	2017	Winger	14	5	0	0	20				
409	Reg Dunning	1959–60	2 April 1960	1966–67	Scrum-half	23	6	2	0 ^²	22				
1080	Tyler Dupree	2018	7 October 2018	2018	Prop	1	1	0	0	4				
1074	Brad Dwyer	2018	10 June 2018	2018	Hooker	3	6	0	0	24				On DR loan from Leeds Rhinos
516	Dave Dyas	1972–73	7 January 1973	1978–79	WInger	84	24	0	0	72				
129	John "Jack" Dyson	1934–35	25 August 1934	1943–44	Prop	201	6	1	0 ^²	20				Occasionally misnamed Frank Dyson
133	Walter Dyson	1934–35	6 October 1934	1934–35	Centre	2	0	0	0	0				
907	Kevin Eadie	2008	3 February 2008	2008	Hooker	10	2	0	0	8				
108	Alex Easter	1931–32	24 March 1932	1933–34	Second-row	46	5	0	0	15				
437	Frank Eastwood	1963–64	29 February 1964	1967–68	Prop	42	1	0	0	3				
1185	Greg Eden	2024	2 June 2024	2024	Winger	15	1	0	0	4				
564	David Edgington	1979–80	6 April 1980	1980–81	Winger	6	1	0	0	3				
243	Tom Edwards	1945–46	6 October 1945	1947–48	Centre	11	8	0	0	24				
357	Ken Elford	1954–55	13 November 1954	1958–59	Fullback	51	1	8	0	19				Kenneth William Elford, birth registered second ¼ 1932 in Pontefract district. He worked in the Education department at County Hall, Wakefield, and died aged 86 on 21 October 2018 ), with his funeral service taking place at Wakefield Crematorium, Kettlethorpe, Wakefield, at 11.00am on Monday 12 November 2018.
884	Gary Ellery	2006	2 April 2006	2008	Prop	14	0	0	0	0				
973	Andy Ellis	2012	19 May 2012	2017	Hooker	122	30	0	0	120				Two stints 2012(loan) & 2013-27
400	Harry Ellis	1958–59	22 November 1958	1960–61	Second-row	2	0	0	0	0				
708	Mark Ellis	1993–94	4 April 1994	1994–95	Prop	7	0	0	0	0				
97	John Emery	1930–31	14 March 1931	1930–31	Centre	6	1	0	0	3				
344	Sid Emery	1952–53	17 January 1953	1952–53	Centre	1	0	0	0	0				
965	Anthony England	2012	19 February 2012	2013	Prop	41	7	0	0	28				
1029	Brad England	2015	6 June 2015	2024	Second-row	24	4	0	0	16				Two stints
1146	Sam Eseh	2022	2 June 2022	2022	Prop	14	3	0	0	12				On loan from Wakefield Trinity
508	Barry Evans	1971–72	24 October 1971	1973–74	Scrum-half	10	2	0	0	6				
726	Danny Evans	1995–96	23 August 1995	2005	Loose forward	169	28	1	0	114	(c)			Three times interim coach
149	Jack Evans	1937–38	28 August 1937	1938–39	Second-row	21	1	0	0	3				
102	Joe Evans	1931–32	19 September 1931	1933–34	Scrum-half	43	2	0	0	6				
112	Joe Evans	1932–33	12 November 1932	1933–34	Loose forward	22	0	0	0	0				
1157	Kyle Evans	2023	19 March 2023	2023	Winger	2	3	0	0	12				
375	Les Evans	1956–57	22 September 1956	1960–61	Centre	64	13	0	0	39				
324	Ray Evans	1951–52	18 August 1951	1954–55	Scrum-half	73	22	2	0	70				
538	Steve Evans	1976–77	26 September 1976	1981–82	Utility back	140	76	1	0	230			(United Kingdom) (England) (Yorkshire)	
95	Wilf Evans	1930–31	21 February 1931	1937–38	Stand-off	199	29	0	0	87				
189	John Eyre	1940–41	12 October 1940	1941–42	Loose forward	2	0	0	0	0				
741	Ty Fallins	1996	1 July 1996	1998	Scrum-half	56	12	113	12	286				
920	Jonathan Fallon	2009	15 February 2009	2009	Prop	17	1	0	0	4				
451	Vince Farrar	1965–66	21 August 1965	1977–78	Prop	309	61	0	0	183	(c)	CC	(England) (Yorkshire) ( (United Kingdom) at Hull FC)	
1172	Oliver Farrar	2024	25 February 2024	2024	Winger	1	0	0	0	0				
1064	Connor Farrell	2017	5 August 2017	2018	Second-row	30	10	0	0	40				Two stints, namely 2017(loan) then permanent 2018
879	Craig Fawcett	2006	12 February 2006	2006	Scrum-half	26	3	0	0	12				
323	Willis Fawley	1950–51	10 March 1951	1966–67	Hooker	371	59	9	0	195				
373	Albert Fearnley	1956–57	8 September 1956	1957–58	Second-row	67	18	2	0	58				
848	Ben Feehan	2004	28 March 2004	2004	Centre	3	1	0	0	4				On loan from Huddersfield Giants
530	Dale Fennell	1975–76	22 August 1975	1979–80	Scrum-half	96	19	0	0	57				
341	Jack "Jackie" Fennell	1952–53	20 December 1952	1964–65	Fullback	322	30	455	0	1000				Testimonial match Saturday 25 May 1963 against Huddersfield
1100	Dale Ferguson	2019	26 May 2019	2021	Prop	8	1	0	0	4				
1109	Brett Ferres	2020	2 February 2020	2022	Second-row	40	12	2	0	52				
1126	Callum Field	2021	10 April 2021	2022	Loose forward	30	4	0	0	16				
896	Jamie Field	2007	11 March 2007	2010	Second-row	86	17	0	0	68				
383	Norman Field	1957–58	15 August 1957	1957–58	Centre	6	1	0	0	3				
867	Liam Finn	2005	10 April 2005	2013	Scrum-half	139	71	597	6	1484	(c)		(Republic of Ireland)	
527	Roy Firth	1974–75	17 November 1974	1974–75	Hooker	5	0	0	0	0				On loan from Bramley RLFC
37	Tom Firth	1922–23	23 September 1922	1926–27	Second-row	19	2	0	0	6				
107	Alec Fisher	1931–32	23 January 1932	1942–43	Winger	1	0	0	0	0				
664	Andy Fisher	1989–90	3 September 1989	1992–93	Loose forward	100	26	0	0	104				
203b	Unknown Fisher	1942	28 March 1942	1942	Centre	6	1	0	0	3				
1174	Zach Fishwick	2024	10 March 2024	2024	Prop	8	0	0	0	0				On DR loan from Hull KR
27	Charlie Flaherty	1921–22	10 December 1921	1928–29	Hooker	35	0	0	0	0				
118	Jack Flaherty	1933–34	9 September 1933	1935–36	Prop	68	3	0	0	9				
989	George Flanagan	2014	16 February 2014	2014	Hooker	19	5	0	0	20				
732	Neil Flanagan	1995–96	1 October 1995	1995–96	Scrum-half	1	0	0	0	0				
307	George Flavell	1949–50	17 September 1949	1949–50		5	0	0	0	0				
1149	Dan Fleming	2022	30 July 2022	2023	Prop	5	0	0	0	0			(Wales)	
234	Arthur Fletcher	1944–45	10 March 1945	1944–45	Scrum-half	1	0	0	0	0				Wartime guest from Hunslet RLFC
830	Adrian Flynn	2003	19 January 2003	2003	Winger	32	15	0	0	60				
842	James Ford	2003	20 July 2003	2005	Winger	34	6	0	0	24				Also Featherstone coach later
1145	Johnathon Ford	2022	21 May 2022	2023	Stand-off	20	4	0	0	16			(Cook Islands)	
465	Colin Forsyth	1965–66	22 April 1966	1967–68	Prop	28	4	0	0	12				
1010	Alex Foster	2015	16 February 2015	2015	Second-row	27	9	0	0	36				
1045	Jamie Foster	2016	1 May 2016	2016	Centre/Winger/Fullback	11	3	38	0	88				
864	John Fowler	2005	6 March 2005	2005	Prop	1	0	0	0	0				
589	Deryck Fox	1983–84	4 September 1983	1997	Scrum-half	353	84	373	63	1145	(c)		(United Kingdom) (Yorkshire)	
348	Don Fox	1953–54	9 September 1953	1965–66	Scrum-half	368	162	503	0 ^²	1492	(c)+(vc)		(United Kingdom) (England) (Yorkshire)	
654	Martin Fox	1987–88	17 April 1988	1987–88	Stand-off	2	0	0	0	0				
349	Peter Fox	1953–54	19 September 1953	1956–57	Loose forward	34	2	15	0 ^²	36				
104	Tom Fox	1931–32	3 October 1931	1934–35	Second-row	26	3	0	0	9				
722	Nick Frankland	1994–95	17 April 1995	1994–95	Stand-off	1	0	0	0	0				
226	… Freeman	1944–45	9 September 1944	1944–45	Winger	1	1	0	0	3				
962	Nathan Freer	2012	15 February 2012	2012	Prop	2	0	0	0	0				
1116	Brandan French	2020	22 February 2020	2020	Centre	2	0	0	0	0				
1117	Gareth Gale	2020	22 February 2020	present	Winger	103	78	0	0	312				
131	Walter Gamble	1934–35	15 September 1934	1934–35	Winger	23	8	0	0	24				
320	Leslie Ganley	1950–51	28 October 1950	1950–51	Winger	1	0	0	0	0				
287	Laurie Gant MBE	1947–48	29 March 1948	1952–53	Second-row	112	15	1	0 ^²	47				
1205	Will Gardiner	2025	23 March 2025	2025	Prop	1	0	0	0	0				On loan from Hull FC
230	Walter Garner	1944–45	25 November 1944	1947–48	Second-row	101	8	0	0	24				
403	Mick Garrity	1958–59	4 April 1959	1959–60	Scrum-half	7	2	0	0	6				
638	Paul Geary	1986–87	22 February 1987	1987–88	Second-row	20	2	0	0	8				
871	Andrew Georgiadis	2005	22 May 2005	2005	Scrum-half	9	4	0	0	16			(Greece)	
543	Brian Gibbins	1977–78	30 October 1977	1977–78	Utility forward	1	0	0	0	0				
505	Michael "Mick" Gibbins	1971–72	7 September 1971	1986–87	Prop	333	12	0	0	36		CC	(Yorkshire)	
677	Mark Gibbon	1989–90	18 February 1990	1992–93	Hooker	14	0	0	0	0				
698	Carl Gibson	1993–94	29 August 1993	1996	Fullback	97	37	1	0	150				
798	Richard Gibson	2000	3 January 2000	2001	Stand-off	18	1	5	0	14				
540	John Gilbert	1976–77	2 January 1977	1987–88	Centre	243	80	0	0	253		CC		sixty-seven 3-point tries, and thirteen 4-point tries
285	Cyril Gilbertson	1947–48	7 February 1948	1951–52	Scrum-half	62	9	4	0 ^²	35				
25	Austin Gill	1921–22	5 November 1921	1921–22	Stand-off	13	1	0	0	3				
1140	Bayley Gill	2022	13 February 2022	2022	Half-back	2	0	0	0	0				
18	Fred Gill	1921–22	24 September 1921	1923–24	Utility back	36	5	0	0	15				
96	J Gill	1930–31	25 February 1931	1930–31	Second-row	1	0	0	0	0				
899	Scott Glassell	2007	31 March 2007	2007	Stand-off	3	1	5	0	14				
749	Paul Gleadhill	1997	26 January 1997	1997	Winger	22	13	0	0	52				
960	Ben Gledhill	2011	5 June 2011	2011	Prop	7	0	0	0	0				On loan from Wakefield Trinity
146	Arthur Glover	1936–37	14 November 1936	1936–37	Prop	11	0	0	0	0				
1020	Pita Godinet	2015	8 March 2015	2015	Hooker	1	0	0	0	0			(Samoa)	On DR loan from Wakefield Trinity
166	Joe Golby	1938–39	15 October 1938	1942–43	Hooker	118	5	0	0	15				
55	George W. Goldie	1924–25	30 August 1924	1938–39	Fullback	74	1	27	0 ^²	57				Born in Streethouse
1049	Ashton Golding	2016	10 July 2016	2016	Fullback	25	9	0	0	36			(Jamaica)	
214	Wallace Goodman	1943–44	27 November 1943	1944–45	Prop	8	0	0	0	0				
758	Steve Goodwin	1997	1 June 1997	1997	Centre	3	1	0	0	4				
1175	Louix Gorman	2024	17 March 2024	2024	Fullback	7	0	11	0	22				On DR loan from Hull KR
684	Alex Goulbourne	1991–92	15 September 1991	1992–93	Winger	5	0	0	0	0				
318	Keith Goulding	1950–51	2 September 1950	1954–55	Centre	87	6	9	0 ^²	36				
312	Don Graham	1949–50	24 December 1949	1949–50	Centre	9	3	0	0	9				
362	Gordon Graham	1955–56	7 September 1955	1955–56	Hooker	1	0	0	0	0				Born c. 1937
818	Nathan Graham	2002	2 December 2001	2003	Fullback	67	21	0	1	85			(Scotland)	
562	Neil Gray	1979–80	16 March 1980	1980–81	Hooker	7	0	0	0	0				
655	Jeff Grayshon MBE	1988–89	28 August 1988	1990–91	Prop	100	2	0	0	8				
933	Jon Grayshon	2010	7 February 2010	2012	Prop/Second-row	75	27	0	0	108				
399	Ken Greatorex	1958–59	11 October 1958	1967–68	Centre	287	101	0	0	303		CC		
1003	Chris Green	2014	1 June 2014	2014	Prop	5	0	0	0	0				
15	James Green	1921–22	3 September 1921	1921–22	Fullback	1	0	0	0	0				
987	James Green	2013	28 July 2013	2013	Prop	3	0	0	0	0				
566	John Gregory	1980–81	14 September 1980	1981–82	Prop	7	0	0	0	0				
855	Maxime Grésèque	2004	25 July 2004	2004	Scrum-half	11	3	17	3	49			(France)	
1038	Darrell Griffin	2016	7 February 2016	2018	Prop	62	3	0	0	12				
82	Ben Gronow	1928–29	13 March 1929	1929–30	Prop	23	2	43	0 ^²	92	(c)			Born in Bridgend
179	Norman Guest	1939–40	2 December 1939	1943–44	Fullback	9	4	1	0 ^²	14				
418	Geoff Gunn	1960–61	19 April 1961	1960–61	Hooker	1	0	0	0	0				
273	Laurie Gunn	1947–48	13 September 1947	1953–54	Winger	38	6	0	0	18				
693	Richard Gunn	1992–93	27 September 1992	1997	Hooker	110	9	0	0	36	(c)			
608	Peter Hafey	1984–85	30 December 1984	1984–85	Scrum-half	2	0	0	0	0				
6	Arthur Haigh	1921–22	27 August 1921	1929–30	Second-row	215	26	0	0	78				Born in Methley or Featherstone
352	Malcolm Haigh	1953–54	5 December 1953	1953–54	Hooker	1	0	0	0	0				
218	… Hale	1943–44	25 December 1943	1943–44	Second-row	1	0	0	0	0				Wartime guest
617	Christopher Hale	1985–86	3 November 1985	1985–86	Scrum-half	1	0	0	0	0				
48	Trevor Hale	1923–24	15 December 1923	1923–24	Centre	3	1	0	0	3				
187	John Haley	1939–40	13 April 1940	1939–40	Fullback	9	0	0	0	0				
949	Michael Haley	2011	4 February 2011	2012	Prop	33	3	0	0	12			(Republic of Ireland)	
771	Carl Hall	1998	22 February 1998	1999	Centre	40	14	0	0	56	(c)			
1179	Corey Hall	2024	14 April 2024	2024	Centre	2	1	0	0	4				On DR loan from Hull KR
1110	Craig Hall	2020	22 February 2020	2023	Fullback	77	61	328	1	901				
640	Gary Hall	1986–87	12 April 1987	1989–90	Prop	8	1	0	0	4				
70	Joe Hall	1927–28	7 January 1928	1928–29	Hooker	31	1	0	0	3				
479	Ian Halliwell	1967–68	23 December 1967	1967–68	Winger	1	0	0	0	0				
1122	Frankie Halton	2021	21 March 2021	2021	Second-row	23	8	0	0	32			(Republic of Ireland)	
441	John Hamer	1963–64	29 April 1964	1963–64	Hooker	1	0	0	0	0				
135	Ray Hamer	1934–35	23 March 1935	1943–44	Scrum-half	152	33	4	0 ^²	107				
412	Len Hammill	1960–61	3 September 1960	1963–64	Prop	94	13	0	0	39			(Yorkshire)	
121	Cyril Hammond	1933–34	7 October 1933	1937–38	Centre	115	24	0	0	72				
1207	Ryan Hampshire	2025	6 April 2025	present	Half-back	4	1	6	0	16				
891	Gareth Handford	2007	11 February 2007	2007	Prop	29	7	0	0	28				
914	Matt Handforth	2008	18 May 2008	2009	Second-row	4	1	0	0	4				
892	Paul Handforth	2007	11 February 2007	2008	Stand-off	50	25	16	5	137			(Republic of Ireland)	
1039	Ash Handley	2016	7 February 2016	2018	Winger/Centre	11	6	0	0	24			(England)	Three separate loan stints in 2016, 2017 & 2018
752	Paddy Handley	1997	9 February 1997	2000	Scrum-half	115	25	0	0	100				
553	Raymond "Ray" Handscombe	1978–79	29 October 1978	1984–85	Hooker	127	15	0	0	45		CC		
561	Steve Hankins	1979–80	3 February 1980	1984–85	Second-row	137	13	0	0	42		CC		ten 3-point tries, and three 4-point tries
1153	Chris Hankinson	2023	6 February 2023	2023	Centre	18	8	18	0	60				
944	Zak Hardaker	2010	4 March 2010	2011	Winger	19	28	0	0	112				
1053	Josh Hardcastle	2017	5 February 2017	present	Centre	172	75	1	0	302				
492	Chris Harding	1969–70	3 January 1970	1971–72	Stand-off	39	3	1	0 ^²	11				
921	Ian Hardman	2009	15 February 2009	2018	Fullback	288	131	151	1	827	(vc)			
585	Paul Harkin	1982–83	4 April 1983	1982–83	Scrum-half	3	0	0	0	0				
1183	Charlie Harris	2024	19 May 2024	2024	Fullback	1	0	0	0	0				
512	George "Billy" Harris	1972–73	3 September 1972	1974–75	Prop	93	12	3	0 ^²	42		CC		
472	Graham Harris	1966–67	17 December 1966	1968–69	Hooker	63	9	6	0 ^²	39		CC		
922	Iestyn Harris	2009	15 February 2009	2009	Stand-off	24	7	36	1	101				
1092	James Harrison	2019	3 March 2019	2021	Second-row	47	19	0	0	76				Son of Karl Harrison
619	Karl Harrison	1985–86	22 December 1985	1988–89	Prop	114	16	0	0	64				Father of James Harrison
491	Peter Harrison	1969–70	1 November 1969	1970–71	Centre	23	2	0	0	6				
119	William Harrison	1933–34	20 September 1933	1933–34	Hooker	7	0	0	0	0				
462	Dave Hartley	1965–66	29 January 1966	1975–76	Winger	302	116	0	0	348		CC x 2	(Yorkshire)	
1195	Jayden Hatton	2025	25 January 2025	present	Centre	4	5	0	0	20				
1160	Arama Hau	2023	14 May 2023	2023	Second-row	10	9	0	0	36				Australian
856	Tommy Haughey	2004	25 July 2004	2009	Loose forward	90	45	0	0	180				
490	John Hay	1969–70	19 October 1969	1973–74	Centre	57	12	0	0	36				
567	Paul Hayden	1980–81	4 January 1981	1982–83	Stand-off	42	8	0	0	24				
845	Adam Hayes	2004	1 February 2004	2005	Loose forward	58	8	0	0	32				
106	William Hayes	1931–32	9 January 1932	1933–34	Scrum-half	70	13	0	0	39				
978	Ben Hellewell	2013	10 February 2013	2014	Centre	40	16	0	0	64			(Scotland)	
794	Ricky Helliwell	2000	27 December 1999	2002	Second-row	44	3	0	0	12				
134	Frank Hemingway	1934–35	10 November 1934	1950–51	Prop	361	5	2	0 ^²	19				
958	Tom Hemingway	2011	1 May 2011	2011	Stand-off	3	1	0	0	4				
846	Bryan Henare	2004	1 February 2004	2004	Second-row	20	1	0	0	4				
801	Brad Hepi	2000	30 January 2000	2000	Second-row	7	2	0	0	8				Father of Tyla Hepi
1144	Tyla Hepi	2022	15 May 2022	2022	Prop	7	0	0	0	0				Son of Brad Hepi
737	Andy Heptinstall	1995–96	26 November 1995	2002	Hooker	52	6	2	1	29				
7	Charlie Hepworth	1921–22	27 August 1921	1928–29	Hooker	163	4	0	0	12				Born in Featherstone
956	Jonny Hepworth	2011	24 March 2011	2013	Utility back	67	29	0	0	116				
259	Harry Herbert	1946–47	16 November 1946	1947–48	Scrum-half	27	2	0	0	6				
343	Johnny Heritage	1952–53	10 January 1953	1955–56	Stand-off	16	4	13	0 ^²	38				
1204	Zach Herring	2025	16 February 2025	2025	Half-back	1	0	0	0	0				Australian
622	David Heselwood	1985–86	19 January 1986	1986–87	Centre	28	3	0	0	12				
913	Sean Hesketh	2008	10 February 2008	2009	Prop	30	6	0	0	24				
78	William Hewitt	1928–29	26 December 1928	1929–30	Prop	7	1	0	0	3				Born in Castleford
756	Simon Hicks	1997	18 May 1997	1997	Second-row	3	0	0	0	0				
195	Jack Higgins	1940–41	21 April 1941	1947–48	Scrum-half	100	15	13	0 ^²	71				
777	Paul Highton	1998	5 April 1998	1998	Second-row	4	2	0	0	8				
17	John Willie Higson	1921–22	17 September 1921	1924–25	Prop	99	11	0	0	33				
529	Clive Hill	1974–75	7 March 1975	1975–76	Winger	30	12	0	0	36			(Wales) Other Nationalities	
704	Gavin Hill	1993–94	1 October 1993	1993–94	Prop	4	0	0	0	0				
503	Ron Hill	1970–71	5 December 1970	1970–71	Loose forward	2	0	0	0	0			(Wales)	On loan from Castleford
639	Mark Hinchcliffe	1986–87	8 March 1987	1986–87	Hooker	5	0	0	0	0				
624	Adrian Hird	1985–86	16 February 1986	1986–87	Prop	4	0	0	0	0				
8	Jack Hirst	1921–22	27 August 1921	1930–31	Centre	278	115	3	0 ^²	351			(England) (Yorkshire)	Born in Featherstone
917	Joe Hirst	2008	13 July 2008	2009	Second-row	21	7	0	0	28				
990	Keegan Hirst	2014	16 February 2014	2014	Prop	20	3	0	0	12				
356	Mick Hirst	1954–55	16 October 1954	1956–57	Centre	58	19	0	0	57			(Yorkshire)	
1011	Jy Hitchcox	2015	16 February 2015	2015	Fullback/Winger/Centre	25	11	0	0	44				
549	David Hobbs	1977–78	27 March 1978	1984–85	Second-row	205	66	105	15	439		CC	(United Kingdom) (England) (Yorkshire)	fifty 3-point tries, and sixteen 4-point tries
542	Kevin Hobbs	1977–78	13 September 1977	1982–83	Centre	30	2	0	0	6				
1066	Gareth Hock	2018	4 February 2018	2018	Prop	20	5	0	0	20				
371	Norman Hockley	1956–57	27 August 1956	1962–63	Second-row	171	11	0	0	33				
976	Tom Hodson	2013	3 February 2013	2013	Winger	12	9	0	0	36				
531	Roland Holden	1975–76	7 September 1975	1976–77	Scrum-half	13	4	0	0	12				
495	Barry Hollis	1969–70	14 March 1970	1975–76	Second-row	86	15	9	0 ^²	63		CC		
1067	Tom Holmes	2018	4 February 2018	2022	Scrum-half	45	13	0	0	52				Two stints, namely, 2018-19 & 2021-22
1114	Tom Holroyd	2020	16 February 2020	2020	Prop	3	0	0	0	0				On DR loan from Leeds Rhinos
44	Herbert Holt	1923–24	15 September 1923	1923–24	Fullback	1	0	0	0	0				Occasionally misnamed J. Holt, or Herbert Hoult
1182	Luke Hooley	2024	5 May 2024	2024	Fullback	1	0	6	0	12				On loan from Castleford Tigers
602	Calvin Hopkins	1983–84	25 March 1984	1987–88	Winger	70	19	0	0	76				
767	Craig Horne	1998	1 February 1998	1998	Winger	21	4	0	0	16				
788	Ryan Horsley	1999	31 January 1999	1999	Stand-off	20	2	0	1	9				
203	Larry Hossack	1941–42	6 December 1941	1945–46	Winger	55	9	0	0	27				
840	James Houston	2003	22 June 2003	2009	Prop	138	9	1	0	38			(Scotland)	
89	Horace Howarth	1929–30	7 December 1929	1929–30	Scrum-half	8	0	0	0	0				1 x Stand-off, 7 x Scrum-half
350	Derek Howes	1953–54	19 September 1953	1954–55	Second-row	27	1	0	0	3				
297	Joe Hoyle	1948–49	20 November 1948	1952–53	Winger	19	3	0	0	9				
487	Terry Hudson	1968–69	7 April 1969	1984–85	Scrum-half	217	30	3	2	99	(c)	CC		twenty-nine 3-point tries, and one 4-point try
445	Stephen Huff	1964–65	31 October 1964	1964–65	Winger	2	0	0	0	0				
156	Bill Hughes	1937–38	30 October 1937	1941–42	Centre	103	19	0	0	57				
859	Carl Hughes	2005	13 February 2005	2008	Hooker	73	34	0	0	136				Brother of Paul Hughes
702	Darren Hughes	1993–94	19 September 1993	1997	Centre	61	28	0	0	112				
526	David Hughes	1974–75	12 October 1974	1975–76	Prop	6	0	0	0	0				
319	Martin Hughes	1950–51	21 October 1950	1950–51	Loose forward	2	0	0	0	0				
875	Paul Hughes	2005	14 August 2005	2007	Hooker	58	19	0	0	76				Brother of Carl Hughes
649	Paul Hughes	1987–88	8 November 1987	1990–91	Second-row	77	19	0	0	76				
322	Fred Hulme	1950–51	17 February 1951	1955–56	Prop	154	7	0	0	21				
392	Jim Hunt	1957–58	5 April 1958	1964–65	Centre	166	35	0	0	105				
606	John Hunter	1984–85	16 December 1984	1985–86	Scrum-half	2	0	0	0	0				
233	Bill Hutchinson	1944–45	10 February 1945	1944–45	Loose forward	2	2	0	0	6				Wartime guest from Bradford Northern
457	George Hutchinson	1965–66	6 November 1965	1965–66	Centre	7	1	0	0	3				
915	Scott Hutton	2008	22 June 2008	2008	Winger	1	0	0	0	0				
888	Jamie I'Anson	2006	23 July 2006	2006	Prop	9	1	0	0	4				On loan from Leeds Rhinos
1062	Daniel Igbinedion	2017	9 July 2017	2017	Second-row	3	0	0	0	0				3 game trial period
1012	Sam Irwin	2015	16 February 2015	2015	Hooker	10	0	0	0	0				Australian
755	Shaun Irwin	1997	23 February 1997	1998	Centre	54	12	0	0	48	(c)			
682	Clarry Iti	1990–91	11 November 1990	1991–92	Second-row, Centre	24	4	0	0	16				New Zealander
1141	Ryley Jacks	2022	6 March 2022	2022	Scrum-half	24	19	0	0	76			(Canada)	Australian
174	Bill Jackson	1939–40	26 August 1939	1941–42	Winger	26	5	0	0	15				Appearances interrupted by military service
772	Chico Jackson	1998	22 February 1998	1998	Prop	28	3	0	0	12				
735	Craig Jackson	1995–96	15 November 1995	1998	Prop	39	3	0	0	12				
815	Simon Jackson	2001	9 May 2001	2002	Centre	14	4	0	0	16				
170	Albert Jacobs	1938–39	21 February 1939	1945–46	Loose forward	41	4	0	0	12				Appearances interrupted by military service
977	Matt James	2013	3 February 2013	2014	Prop	76	17	0	0	68				
511	Peter Jameson	1971–72	4 March 1972	1974–75	Scrum-half	14	0	9	0 ^²	18				
839	Andy Jarrett	2003	18 May 2003	2005	Prop	30	4	0	0	16				
550	Francis Jarvis	1978–79	20 August 1978	1980–81	Second-row	36	6	0	0	18				
310	Robert Jarvis	1949–50	12 November 1949	1952–53	Stand-off	33	2	0	0	6				
304	Ken Jefferson	1948–49	16 April 1949	1948–49	Second-row	3	0	0	0	0				
1191	Maddox Jeffery	2024	28 July 2024	present	Winger	4	0	0	0	0				
688	John Jepson	1991–92	20 October 1991	1991–92	Winger	1	0	0	0	0				
1102	Corey Johnson	2019	5 June 2019	2019	Hooker	2	0	0	0	0				On DR loan from Leeds Rhinos
77	Cyril Johnson	1928–29	1 December 1928	1928–29	Centre	4	1	0	0	3				
103	George Johnson	1931–32	19 September 1931	1935–36	Fullback	108	6	50	0 ^²	118	(c)			
141b	George Johnson	1935	14 December 1935	1935–36	Fullback	5	0	0	0	0				No relation to #103
1108	Jack Johnson	2019	4 August 2019	2019	Winger	9	3	0	0	12				
1022	Kryan Johnson	2015	21 March 2015	2017	Winger	33	11	23	0	90				
954	Matty Johnson	2011	5 March 2011	2011	Hooker	1	2	0	0	8				
361	Peter Johnson	1955–56	29 August 1955	1955–56	Winger	16	7	0	0	21				
578	Peter Johnson	1982–83	29 September 1982	1982–83	Prop	2	0	0	0	0				
577	Phil Johnson	1982–83	22 August 1982	1983–84	Stand-off	31	6	0	0	18				
32	Taylor Johnson	1921–22	11 February 1922	1921–22	Centre	4	2	0	0	6				
1187	Luis Johnson	2024	16 June 2024	2024	Second-row	2	0	0	0	0				On loan from Castleford Tigers
1021	Tom Johnstone	2015	8 March 2015	2015	Winger	2	1	0	0	4				On DR loan from Wakefield Trinity
29	Clifford Jones	1921–22	31 December 1921	1921–22	Second-row	4	0	0	0	0				
1107	Connor Jones	2019	13 July 2019	present	Hooker	122	77	0	0	308				Australian
636	David Jones	1986–87	18 January 1987	1987–88	Winger	28	9	0	0	36				From Wakefield Trinity
9	Dick Jones	1921–22	27 August 1921	1924–25	Centre	19	1	0	0	3				
292	Eric Jones	1948–49	9 October 1948	1949–50	Centre	3	0	0	0	0				
202	Ernie Jones	1941–42	15 November 1941	1942–43	Second-row	4	0	0	0	0				
969	Lewis Jones	2012	25 March 2012	2012	Prop	1	0	0	0	0				
868	Steve Jones	2005	10 April 2005	2005	Centre	4	0	0	0	0				
809	Stephen Jones	2001	31 January 2001	2001	Second-row	6	2	0	0	8				
379	Wynne Jones	1956–57	26 January 1957	1959–60	Prop	86	9	0	0	27				Three-quarter from Huddersfied Giants (loan), then to Batley Bulldogs (loan), then to Newcastle Falcons (RUFC)
804	Rhys Jones-Orris	2000	4 June 2000	2000	Prop	3	0	0	0	0				On loan from Leeds Rhinos
420	Gary Jordan	1961–62	19 August 1961	1969–70	Winger	229	115	0	0	345		CC	(United Kingdom)	
1115	Louis Jouffret	2020	16 February 2020	2020	Stand-off	5	2	0	0	8			(France)	
824	Robin Jowitt	2002	14 July 2002	2003	Prop	21	1	0	0	4				
985	Jake Joynt	2013	23 June 2013	2013	Prop	1	0	0	0	0				
1196	Will Jubb	2025	25 January 2025	present	Hooker	4	0	0	0	0				
197	Billy Judge	1941–42	6 September 1941	1941–42	Second-row	1	0	0	0	0				Also a late draft-in wartime guest for visiting St Helens, and played well against Fetaherstone.
305	Albert Jukes	1948–49	19 April 1949	1949–50	Loose forward	8	0	0	0	0				
177	Reginald Jukes	1939–40	18 November 1939	1946–47	Loose forward	16	1	0	0	3				Appearances interrupted by military service
901	Andy Kain	2007	2 June 2007	2014	Stand-off	210	128	6	1	525				Cousin of Stuart Kain
923	Stuart Kain	2009	15 February 2009	2009	Fullback	8	3	0	0	12				Cousin of Andy Kain
1166	Moris Kamano	2024	28 January 2024	2024	Prop	20	1	0	0	4				
865	Andy Kay	2005	6 March 2005	2006	Hooker	8	1	0	0	4				
945	Ben Kaye	2010	4 March 2010	2013	Hooker	98	8	0	0	32				
488	Barry Kear	1969–70	25 August 1969	1972–73	Prop	38	10	0	0	30				
623	Brian Kellett	1985–86	19 January 1986	1986–87	Fullback	18	2	0	0	8				
480	Cyril Kellett	1967–68	20 January 1968	1973–74	Fullback	171	15	557	0 ^²	1159	(c)	CC		
464	Dave Kellett	1965–66	12 April 1966	1970–71	Stand-off, centre	118	29	0	0	87				
499	Ken Kellett	1970–71	29 September 1970	1982–83	Winger	358	124	0	0	372		CC x 2		
637	Lee Kellett	1986–87	25 January 1987	1986–87	Loose forward	5	0	0	0	0				
315	Brian Kelly	1949–50	28 January 1950	1954–55	Centre	63	14	0	0	42				
628	Neil Kelly	1985–86	31 March 1986	1986–87	Loose forward	7	0	0	0	0				
163	Thomas Kelly	1938–39	27 August 1938	1938–39	Centre	1	0	0	0	0				
448	Brian Kennedy	1964–65	19 December 1964	1964–65	Utility back	2	0	0	0	0				
1007	Liam Kent	2014	22 June 2014	2014	Prop	4	1	0	0	4				
239	Malcolm Kent	1944–45	28 April 1945	1951–52	Second-row	100	5	0	0	15				
1142	Mark Kheirallah	2022	3 April 2022	2023	Fullback	24	17	72	0	212			(France)	
1192	Samy Kibula	2024	28 July 2024	2024	Prop	3	0	0	0	0				On loan from Castleford Tigers
101	Matt Killingbeck	1931–32	29 August 1931	1939–40	Centre	60	13	31	0 ^²	101				Won county honours (not Yorkshire?) and played for Hunslet RLFC. Joined the RAF as a gunner, and was killed in World War II
753	David Kimmel	1997	9 February 1997	1998	Centre	47	18	0	1	73				Australian
1086	Cameron King	2019	3 February 2019	2019	Hooker	28	18	3	0	78				Australian
260	Charlie King	1946–47	16 November 1946	1946–47	Hooker	17	0	0	0	0				
272	C. King	1947–48	23 August 1947	1947–48		2	0	0	0	0				
282	John King	1947–48	24 January 1948	1947–48	Fullback	4	0	1	0 ^²	2				On loan from Oldham RLFC
393	Ken Kingsbury	1958–59	16 August 1958	1959–60	Second-row	10	2	9	0 ^²	24				
30	Lou Kingsbury	1921–22	31 December 1921	1925–26	Winger	27	4	0	0	12				
386	Brian Kinsey	1957–58	28 September 1957	1960–61	Winger	42	14	0	0	42				
397	Vic Kinsey	1958–59	5 September 1958	1958–59	Prop	4	2	0	0	6				
46	Vince Kinsey	1923–24	19 September 1923	1926–27	Loose forward	39	4	0	0	12				
908	Andy Kirk	2008	3 February 2008	2009	Centre	50	18	0	0	72				
360	Malcolm Kirk	1954–55	23 April 1955	1957–58	Prop	35	1	0	0	3				Also a professional wrestler, “King Kong” Kirk
10	Joe Kirkham	1921–22	27 August 1921	1923–24	Scrum-half	69	30	0	0	90				From Dewsbury in 1921
870	Danny Kirmond	2005	24 April 2005	2007	Winger	73	41	0	0	164				
665	Mark Knapper	1989–90	3 September 1989	1989–90	Winger	16	6	43	0	110				
763	Guillaume Knecht	1997	3 August 1997	1997	Second-row	1	0	0	0	0				
1032	Brad Knowles	2015	9 August 2015	2018	Second-row	74	8	0	0	32				
184	Cyril Knowles	1939–40	26 March 1940	1939–40	Fullback	1	0	0	0	0				Wartime guest player from York
1057	Michael Knowles	2017	19 February 2017	2017	Second-row	14	1	22	0	48				
1123	Craig Kopczak	2021	21 March 2021	2023	Prop	51	12	0	0	48			(Wales)	
434	Milan Kosanović	1963–64	1 February 1964	1966–67	Hooker	94	1	0	0	3		CC		
1156	Thomas Lacans	2023	19 February 2023	2023	Half-back	28	17	15	1	99			(France)	
308	Cliff Lambert	1949–50	20 September 1949	1961–62	Loose forward	376	82	3	0 ^²	252	(vc)			
750	Matt Lambert	1997	26 January 1997	2000	Loose forward	57	7	0	0	28	(c)			Australian
427	David Lamming	1961–62	10 March 1962	1962–63	Loose forward	24	6	0	0	18				
384	Ray Lancaster	1957–58	14 September 1957	1957–58	Winger	5	1	0	0	3				
201	Jack Lane	1941–42	18 October 1941	1945–46	Winger	54	10	0	0	30				
795	Chris Langley	2000	27 December 1999	2003	Centre	17	7	0	0	28				Two loan spells from Huddersfield Giants
625	Terry Langton	1985–86	16 February 1986	1986–87	Scrum-half	7	1	0	0	4				
882	Nathan Larvin	2006	5 March 2006	2007	Fullback	32	10	0	0	40				
290	Jim Lavin	1948–49	18 September 1948	1950–51	Prop	36	1	0	0	3				
789	Martin Law	1999	31 January 1999	2000	Centre	60	15	0	0	60				
739	Steve Lay	1996	31 March 1996	1997	Fullback	19	2	0	0	8				
211	Bill Leake	1943–44	11 September 1943	1943–44	Fullback	12	0	0	0	0				
918	Jack Lee	2008	13 July 2008	2010	Hooker	43	10	0	0	40				
979	Jack Lee	2013	7 April 2013	2013	Hooker	1	0	0	0	0				
1139	Joey Leilua	2022	7 February 2022	2023	Centre	46	32	0	0	128			(Samoa)	
237	George Lewis	1944–45	14 April 1945	1944–45	Fullback	1	0	0	0	0				Wartime guest player from Castleford
650	Steve Lidbury	1987–88	8 November 1987	1987–88	Winger	1	1	0	0	4				
1043	Jordan Lilley	2016	3 April 2016	2018	Scrum-half	5	2	3	1	15				Two DR loans spells from Leeds Rhinos
519	Barry Limb	1973–74	25 March 1974	1980–81	Second-row	25	0	0	0	0				
1148	Tom Lineham	2022	17 July 2022	2022	Winger	10	4	0	0	16				On loan from Wakefield Trinity
120	Benny Lingard	1933–34	20 September 1933	1942–43	Winger	89	12	0	0	36				
727	Glyn Lingard	1995–96	23 August 1995	1995–96	Second-row	3	0	0	0	0				
419	Ivor Lingard	1960–61	19 April 1961	1963–64	Stand-off	69	20	0	0	60				
909	Lee Lingard	2008	3 February 2008	2008	Winger	14	4	0	0	16				
98	J. Lister	1930–31	14 March 1931	1930–31	Prop	7	0	0	0	0				
116	Bert Lockwood	1932–33	11 April 1933	1939–40	Fullback	87	0	99	0 ^²	198				
963	James Lockwood	2012	15 February 2012	2024	Prop, Second-row	267	39	0	0	156				
123	Harry Lomas	1933–34	18 November 1933	1935–36	Hooker	28	2	0	0	6				No connection to James Lomas
164	Albany Longley	1938–39	12 September 1938	1950–51	Winger	157	76	0	0	228			(Yorkshire)	Centre for Northern Command XIII in 1942
317	Norman Longley	1950–51	30 August 1950	1955–56	Second-row	68	15	0	0	45				
1162	Ellis Longstaff	2023	29 July 2023	2023	Second-row	4	1	0	0	4				Son of Spencer Longstaff
473	Gordon Longstaff	1966–67	1 February 1967	1967–68	Centre	4	0	0	0	0				
685	Spencer Longstaff	1991–92	6 October 1991	1991–92	Winger	9	2	0	0	8				
810	Gary Lord	2001	18 February 2001	2001	Prop	21	0	0	0	0				
38	Arthur Lorriman	1922–23	9 December 1922	1927–28	Hooker	81	7	0	0	21				Born in Featherstone
299	Bernard Lorriman	1948–49	18 December 1948	1949–50	Fullback	6	0	8	0 ^²	16				
666	Brett Love	1989–90	10 September 1989	1989–90	Centre	1	0	0	0	0				Australian
759	Neil Lowe	1997	8 June 1997	2005	Second-row	219	71	1	0	286			(Scotland)	
431	Eric Loxton	1962–63	22 May 1963	1965–66	Second-row	10	2	2	0 ^²	10				
264	Ernest Luckman	1946–47	1 January 1947	1947–48	Fullback	17	1	0	0	3				
600	Steve Lund	1983–84	9 March 1984	1983–84	Winger	7	1	0	0	4				
1129	Darcy Lussick	2021	13 June 2021	2021	Prop	2	0	0	0	0				Australian
199b	Horace Lyman	1939–40	2 September 1939	1948–49	Prop	83	2	0	0	6				
176	John Lyman	1939–40	2 September 1939	1940–41	Fullback	2	0	0	0	0				Older brother of Horace
580	Paul Lyman	1982–83	21 November 1982	1988–89	Loose forward	159	62	0	0	247		CC	(Yorkshire)	one 3-point try, and sixty-one 4-point tries
478	Ray Lyman	1967–68	18 November 1967	1967–68	Second-row	4	0	0	0	0				Son of Horace, father of Paul
938	Tom Lynch	2010	14 February 2010	2010	Prop	1	0	0	0	0				
416	Tony Lynch	1960–61	4 March 1961	1966–67	Centre	99	33	0	0	99				
467	Steve Lyons	1966–67	24 September 1966	1971–72	Prop	119	12	0	0	36				
970	Liam Mackay	2012	25 March 2012	2012	Loose forward	2	0	0	0	0				
734	Damien Mackie	1995–96	5 November 1995	1996	Centre	12	2	0	0	8				
609	Andy Mackintosh	1984–85	20 January 1985	1987–88	Stand-off	25	7	0	0	28				
300	Edward Mackrell	1948–49	18 December 1948	1949–50	Loose forward	6	0	0	0	0				
751	Lee Maher	1997	26 January 1997	1998	Fullback	22	1	0	0	4				
265	George Mahon	1946–47	11 January 1947	1946–47	Winger	2	0	0	0	0				
266	Jack Maiden	1946–47	1 February 1947	1947–48	Prop	26	2	0	0	6				
1024	Reni Maitua	2015	12 April 2015	2015	Second-row	13	5	0	0	20				Australian
188	George Major	1939–40	20 April 1940	1950–51	Second-row	78	7	1	0 ^²	23				Two separate spells for the club
1094	Makahesi Makatoa	2019	24 March 2019	2019	Prop	25	3	0	0	12			(Cook Islands)	New Zealander
967	Dominic Maloney	2012	4 March 2012	2012	Prop	24	3	0	0	12				Nephew of Francis Maloney
695	Francis Maloney	1992–93	10 January 1993	1993–94	Stand-off	35	17	23	2	116				Uncle of Dominic Maloney
114	John "Johnny" Malpass	1932–33	7 January 1933	1935–36	Centre	92	12	0	0	36				
939	Dane Manning	2010	14 February 2010	2010	Second-row	23	4	0	0	16				
672	Terry Manning	1989–90	29 October 1989	1993–94	Centre	159	46	0	0	184				
940	Larsen Marabe	2010	23 February 2010	2010	Centre	2	3	0	0	12				PNG
353	Alan Marchant	1953–54	5 December 1953	1956–57	Winger	47	8	0	0	24				
368	Alan Marchant	1955–56	24 March 1956	1959–60	Scum-half	20	7	0	0	21				
1013	Rémy Marginet	2015	16 February 2015	2015	Scrum-half	15	7	12	2	54			(France)	
982	Frankie Mariano	2013	28 April 2013	2018	Second-row	33	13	0	0	52			(Scotland)	2 spells with the club
288	Alfred Marklew	1947–48	3 April 1948	1947–48	Loose forward	3	0	0	0	0				On loan from Bradford Northern
401b	Brian Marsden	1958–59	7 February 1959	1958–59	Winger	1	1	0	0	3				
520	John Marsden	1973–74	25 March 1974	1984–85	Utility back	157	23	0	0	69		CC		
366	Robert Marsden	1955–56	21 January 1956	1958–59	Winger	9	2	0	0	6				Appearances interrupted by national service
569	Richard Marsh	1981–82	30 August 1981	1988–89	Winger	123	23	0	0	89				Three 3-point tries, and twenty 4-point tries
74	Edward Martin	1927–28	7 April 1928	1929–30	Scrum-half	9	1	0	0	3				
744	Colin Maskill	1996	21 July 1996	1997	Hooker	14	1	12	1	29				
1070	Danny Maskill	2018	20 March 2018	2019	Hooker	20	2	0	0	8				Son of Colin Maskill
39	Les Mason	1922–23	9 December 1922	1924–25	Winger	22	10	0	0	30				
500	Mel Mason	1970–71	5 October 1970	1974–75	Stand-off	121	34	5	0 ^²	112		CC		
626	Mark Massa	1985–86	16 February 1986	1985–86	Winger	3	0	0	0	0				On loan from Leeds RLFC
916	Nathan Massey	2008	22 June 2008	2024	Prop	10	1	0	0	4				2 spells with the club, namely 2008 (loan from Castleford) & 2024
1143	Ben Mathiou	2022	25 April 2022	2022	Prop	1	0	0	0	0				Australian
860	Danny Maun	2005	13 February 2005	2005	Centre	21	10	0	0	40				
1127	Loui McConnell	2021	10 April 2021	2022	Loose forward	14	0	0	0	0				
1095	Jimmy McDaniel	2019	24 March 2019	2019	Winger	2	0	0	0	0				
52	Jos McGlone	1923–24	15 January 1924	1923–24	Stand-off	16	4	0	0	12				
880	Wayne McHugh	2006	12 February 2006	2008	Centre	75	59	0	0	236				
1103	Callum McLelland	2019	5 June 2019	2020	Stand-off	15	5	0	0	20			(Scotland)	
905	Joe McLocklan	2007	21 July 2007	2009	Hooker	63	10	10	0	60				
599	Allan McMahon	1983–84	18 December 1983	1983–84	Fullback	9	0	0	0	0				Australian
831	Andy McNally	2003	19 January 2003	2005	Stand-off	34	14	1	0	58				2 spells with the club, initially on loan from Castleford
560	John McNeill	1979–80	6 January 1980	1979–80	Hooker	5	0	0	0	0				
984	Vince Mellars	2013	9 June 2013	2013	Centre	11	5	0	0	20				New Zealander
991	James Mendeika	2014	16 February 2014	2015	Centre	22	20	0	0	80				
331	Don Metcalfe	1951–52	2 February 1952	1956–57	Centre	149	54	1	0 ^²	164	(c)		(Yorkshire)	
65	Fred Millard	1925–26	12 December 1925	1925–26	Prop	5	0	0	0	0				
314	Freddie Miller	1949–50	21 January 1950	1952–53	Fullback	92	2	245	0 ^²	496				
728	Tony Miller	1995–96	23 August 1995	1997	Loose forward	21	1	0	0	4				
757	John Millington	1997	18 May 1997	1997	Winger	4	0	0	0	0				
148	Jackie Mills	1936–37	6 February 1937	1936–37	Fullback	10	0	2	0 ^²	4				On loan from Halifax RLFC
1023	Will Milner	2015	21 March 2015	2016	Stand-off	22	7	0	0	28				
849	Craig Milnthorpe	2004	28 March 2004	2004	Utility-back	1	0	0	0	0				
1167	Greg Minikin	2024	28 January 2024	2024	Centre	31	11	0	0	44				
1017	Thomas Minns	2015	1 March 2015	2021	Centre	28	13	0	0	52				Two spells, the first was on loan from Leeds Rhinos
697	Steve Minter	1992–93	12 April 1993	1992–93	Winger	2	4	0	0	16				
213	… Mitchell	1943–44	13 November 1943	1943–44	Centre	3	3	0	0	9				Wartime guest player
330	Norman Mitchell	1951–52	8 December 1951	1955–56	Winger	85	15	33	0 ^²	111				
280	Lister Mogg	1947–48	20 December 1947	1948–49	Hooker	17	1	0	0	3				
699	Steve Molloy	1993–94	29 August 1993	1997	Prop	128	23	0	0	92	(c)		(United Kingdom) (England)	
832	Chris Molyneux	2003	19 January 2003	2003	Prop	30	1	0	0	4				
394	Frank Moore	1958–59	16 August 1958	1960–61	Prop	61	10	0	0	30				
992	Gareth Moore	2014	16 February 2014	2015	Scrum-half	45	21	109	2	304				
1058	Richard Moore	2017	19 February 2019	2018	Prop	45	1	0	0	4				
1124	Junior Moors	2021	27 March 2021	2023	Second-row	62	10	0	0	40				New Zealander
426	Arnie Morgan	1961–62	17 February 1962	1971–72	Second-row	245	49	21	0 ^²	189		CC	(United Kingdom) (England) (Yorkshire)	
791	Dale Morgan	1999	14 February 1999	1999	Second-row	1	0	0	0	0				
425	Dennis Morgan	1961–62	27 January 1962	1970–71	Hooker	58	3	0	0	9				
806	Gavin Morgan	2001	3 December 2000	2002	Prop	45	11	0	0	44				
167	George Morgan	1938–39	26 November 1938	1941–42	Stand-off	43	5	1	0 ^²	17				
26	Joe Morgan	1921–22	7 December 1921	1932–33	Loose forward	247	19	0	0	57				Born in Featherstone
745	Jon Morgan	1996	4 August 1996	1997	Second-row	2	0	0	0	0				
90	Luke Morgan	1929–30	18 January 1930	1934–35	Second-row	167	4	2	0 ^²	16				
552	Mick Morgan	1978–79	24 September 1978	1980–81	Prop	94	30	0	0	90	(c)			
79	Tommy Morgan	1928–29	26 December 1928	1930–31	Loose forward	15	1	0	0	3				Younger brother of Joe & Luke Morgan
208	Cyril Morrell	1942–43	13 February 1943	1942–43	Centre	2	0	0	0	0				Wartime guest player from Hunslet RLFC
14	John Morrell	1921–22	29 August 1921	1922–23	Loose forward	24	1	0	0	3				
87	John Morris	1929–30	21 September 1929	1931–32	Winger	31	5	0	0	15				
721	Lynton Morris	1994–95	5 April 1995	1994–95	Second-row	1	0	0	0	0				On loan from Wakefield Trinity
85	Percy Morris	1929–30	31 August 1929	1936–37	Hooker	209	2	0	0	6			(Yorkshire)	
934	Iain Morrison	2010	7 February 2010	2011	Prop	28	3	0	0	12			(Scotland)	
593	Andrew Mortimer	1983–84	16 October 1983	1983–84	Second-row	1	0	0	0	0				
850	Craig Moss	2004	28 March 2004	2007	Fullback	53	6	0	0	24			(Wales)	
160	Harold Moxon	1937–38	5 February 1938	1946–47	Scrum-half	112	16	10	0 ^²	68	(c)			
388	Stan Moyser	1957–58	7 December 1957	1957–58	Hooker	16	2	0	0	6				
1050	Anthony Mullally	2016	10 July 2016	2017	Prop	4	0	0	0	0			(Republic of Ireland)	2 separate loan spells from Leeds Rhinos
346	Joe Mullaney	1953–54	15 August 1953	1964–65	Stand-off	319	85	7	0 ^²	269	(c)		(England) (Yorkshire)	
157	James Mullins	1937–38	4 December 1937	1938–39	Hooker	21	0	0	0	0				
825	Damian Munro	2002	1 September 2002	2002	Centre	4	6	0	0	24			(Republic of Ireland)	
584	Peter Muscroft	1982–83	6 March 1983	1982–83	Winger	5	3	0	0	9				
1081	Muizz Mustapha	2018	7 October 2018	2018	Prop	1	0	0	0	0				On loan from Leeds Rhinos
952	Mufaro Mvududu	2011	20 February 2011	2012	Second-row	15	3	0	0	12				Zimbabwean
718	Joe Naidole	1994–95	6 January 1995	1997	Second-row	49	8	0	0	32				
1186	Ben Nakubuwai	2024	2 June 2024	2024	Prop	18	0	0	0	0				On loan from Leigh Leopards
244	Herbert Nash	1945–46	3 November 1945	1945–46	Hooker	23	0	0	0	0				
474	Steve Nash	1966–67	11 March 1967	1974–75	Scrum-half	201	52	70	2	298		CC	(United Kingdom) (England) (Yorkshire)	
33	George Naylor	1921–22	18 March 1922	1921–22	Hooker	8	0	0	0	0				
136	Harry Naylor	1934–35	23 March 1935	1939–40	Centre	102	15	0	0	45				
321	Stan Naylor	1950–51	11 November 1950	1952–53	Fullback	21	0	0	0	0				
47	Tommy Needham	1923–24	3 November 1923	1923–24	Scrum-half	1	0	0	0	0				
959	Kirk Netherton	2011	15 May 2011	2011	Hooker	15	4	0	0	16				
469	John Newlove	1966–67	19 November 1966	1978–79	Centre	382	147	4	1	450	(c)	CC x 2	(Yorkshire)	Testimonial match 1976, father of Paul Newlove & Richard Newlove
658	Paul Newlove	1988–89	27 September 1988	1992–93	Centre	150	122	9	0	506			(United Kingdom) (England) (Yorkshire)	
729	Richard Newlove	1995–96	3 September 1995	2005	Centre	112	71	0	0	284				2 spells with the club
673	Shaun Newlove	1989–90	7 November 1989	1991–92	Fullback	7	1	0	0	4				
1071	Harry Newman	2018	25 March 2018	2019	Centre	18	21	0	0	84				2 loan spells from Leeds Rhinos, in 2018 & 2019 respectively
140	Frank Newton	1935–36	23 November 1935	1937–38		46	8	0	0	24				
339	Peter Newton	1952–53	27 September 1952	1953–54	Prop	5	0	0	0	0				
866	Greg Nicholson	2005	6 March 2005	2006	Loose forward	35	1	0	0	4				
404	Stan Nicholson	1958–59	4 April 1959	1969–70	Second-row	127	9	1	0 ^²	29				
595	Tony Nicholson	1983–84	19 October 1983	1985–86	Utility forward	6	1	0	0	4				Nephew of Stan Nicholson
714	Mark Nixon	1994–95	4 October 1994	1994–95	Stand-off	24	6	0	0	24				New Zealander
125	Cyril Noble	1933–34	3 February 1934	1936–37	Utility back	30	3	0	0	9				
377	Ken Noble	1956–57	15 December 1956	1958–59	Loose forward	4	1	0	0	3				
382	Barry Nock	1956–57	22 April 1957	1956–57	Prop	1	0	0	0	0				
521	Robert Noon	1973–74	25 March 1974	1978–79	Hooker	18	2	0	0	6				
62	Fred Norbury	1924–25	21 February 1925	1933–34	Second-row	138	10	0	0	30				
281	Ken Norbury	1947–48	27 December 1947	1948–49	Fullback	8	0	4	0 ^²	8				
533	Stuart Norris	1975–76	21 September 1975	1976–77	Hooker	3	0	0	0	0				
454	Les Northern	1965–66	30 August 1965	1965–66	Centre	5	0	0	0	0				
215	Eric Nowell	1943–44	11 December 1943	1943–44	Second-row	2	0	0	0	0				
971	David Nurse	2012	25 March 2012	2012	Hooker	1	0	0	0	0				
700	Richard O'Brien	1993–94	29 August 1993	1994–95	Second-row	7	0	0	0	0				
632	Mick O'Byrne	1986–87	9 November 1986	1986–87	Winger	1	0	0	0	0				
1197	Bailey O'Connor	2025	25 January 2025	present	Centre	2	1	0	0	4				
1111	Jarrod O'Connor	2020	2 February 2020	2020	Second-row	2	0	0	0	0				On loan from Leeds Rhinos
833	Brendan O'Meara	2003	19 January 2003	2003	Centre	31	8	0	0	32				Australian
572	Tony O'Toole	1981–82	29 November 1981	1986–87	Hooker	12	1	0	0	3				
227	Jack Ogden	1944–45	9 September 1944	1952–53	Second-row	156	10	0	0	30				Brother of Maurice
328	Maurice Ogden	1951–52	1 October 1951	1956–57	Utility forward	51	6	0	0	18				Brother of Jack
790	Hitro Okesene	1999	31 January 1999	1999	Prop	32	3	0	0	12				
354	Peter Oldroyd	1953–54	27 March 1954	1953–54	Winger	1	0	0	0	0				
1061	Mikolaj Oledzki	2017	9 April 2017	2018	Prop	5	0	0	0	0				On DR loan from Leeds Rhinos
485	Norman Oliver	1968–69	26 October 1968	1968–69	Winger	3	0	0	0	0				
1202	Derrell Olpherts	2025	9 February 2025	present	Winger	3	0	0	0	0				
980	Jack Ormondroyd	2013	7 April 2013	2019	Prop	103	20	0	0	80				Three spells with the club, 2017 & 2018 on loan from Leeds Rhinos, and lastly 2019
1120	Sam Ottewell	2020	13 March 2020	2020	Fullback	1	1	0	0	4				
105	Les Padgett	1931–32	17 October 1931	1937–38	Prop	81	1	0	0	3				
768	Rob Padgett	1998	1 February 1998	1999	Second-row	11	1	0	0	4				
676	Aaron Palelei	1989–90	11 February 1990	1989–90	Prop	5	1	0	0	4				New Zealander
267	Ken Palmer	1946–47	1 February 1947	1948–49	Prop	46	8	18	0 ^²	60				
1112	Dean Parata	2020	2 February 2020	2021	Hooker	25	13	0	0	52				Australian
238	… Parker	1944–45	14 April 1945	1944–45	Scrum-half	1	0	0	0	0				Triallist or wartime guest
941	Jessie Joe Parker	2010	23 February 2010	2010	Centre	15	17	0	0	68			(Papua New Guinea)	PNG
440	Keith Parker	1963–64	25 April 1964	1966–67	Prop	13	0	0	0	0				
169	Walter Parkin	1938–39	28 January 1939	1945–46	Fullback	130	5	41	0 ^²	97				
834	Danny Patrickson	2003	19 January 2003	2004	Stand-off	7	0	0	0	0				
1188	Declan Patton	2024	23 June 2024	2024	Stand-off	8	1	14	0	34				
199	Cyril Pawson	1941–42	20 September 1941	1948–49	Utility back	91	5	56	0 ^²	127				
269	Les 'Butch' Payne	1946–47	12 April 1947	1951–52	Second-row	97	13	0	0	39				
781	Jamie Peacock	1998	26 July 1998	1998	Prop	4	1	0	0	4				On loan from Bradford Bulls
203c	Bill Pearson	1942	17 October 1942	1944	Second-row	34	0	0	0	0				
955	Cayci Pearson	2011	5 March 2011	2011	Prop	2	0	0	0	0				
663	Martin Pearson	1988–89	1 March 1989	1996	Stand-off	166	101	464	6	1338				
154	Wilf Pearson	1937–38	2 October 1937	1943–44	Second-row	155	14	0	0	42	(c)			
459	Fred Peckitt	1965–66	20 November 1965	1965–66	Centre	1	0	0	0	0				
432	George Penketh	1963–64	14 September 1963	1965–66	Centre	46	9	0	0	27				
311	Francis Peterson	1949–50	10 December 1949	1949–50	Loose forward	2	0	0	0	0				
1073	Nathaniel Peteru	2018	29 April 2018	2018	Prop	1	0	0	0	0				New Zealander. On DR loan from Leeds Rhinos
613	Rod Pethybridge	1985–86	6 October 1985	1985–86	Centre	7	1	0	0	4				Australian
998	Shaun Pick	2014	4 May 2014	2014	Second-row	13	2	0	0	8				
573	Neil Pickerill	1981–82	28 March 1982	1983–84	Scrum-half	38	5	0	3	18				From Batley
1135	Brandon Pickersgill	2022	31 January 2022	2023	Fullback	13	7	0	0	28				
80	Thomas Pickup	1928–29	19 January 1929	1929–30	Stand-off	41	8	0	0	24				Born in Wakefield
223	Albert Place	1944–45	2 September 1944	1946–47	Winger	51	8	1	0 ^²	26				
117	Cyril Plenderleith	1932–33	16 April 1933	1934–35	Second-row	53	12	0	0	36			(Yorkshire)	To Hunslet F.C. in December 1934
150	John Pollitt	1937–38	28 August 1937	1939–40	Fullback	75	1	47	0 ^²	97				
408	Alan Pool	1959–60	26 March 1960	1959–60	Winger	5	1	0	0	3				
182	Silas Poole	1939–40	9 March 1940	1939–40	Fullback	1	0	0	0	0				
861	Bryn Powell	2005	13 February 2005	2011	Winger	52	34	0	0	136			(Wales)	
678	Paul Powell	1989–90	7 March 1990	1989–90	Winger	2	1	0	0	4				
736	Roy Powell	1995–96	19 November 1995	1997	Prop	61	5	0	0	20			(United Kingdom) (Yorkshire)	
760	Karl Pratt	1997	8 June 1997	1998	Winger	48	30	0	1	121				
837	Jon Presley	2003	16 March 2003	2005	Scrum-half	40	15	0	0	60				
701	Gary H. Price	1993–94	29 August 1993	1998	Hooker	125	23	0	0	92				
668	Gary S. Price	1989–90	17 September 1989	1994–95	Second-row	125	13	0	0	52				
110	Jim Price	1932–33	27 August 1932	1937–38	Loose forward	26	4	2	0 ^²	16				
742	Simon Price	1996	26 May 1996	1996	Centre	2	0	0	0	0				
378	Ron Priestley	1956–57	19 January 1957	1956–57	Loose forward	2	0	0	0	0				
910	Waine Pryce	2008	3 February 2008	2009	Winger	47	24	0	0	96				
1104	Morgan Punchard	2019	5 June 2019	2019	Scrum-half	1	1	2	0	8				
411	Brian Quarmby	1959–60	2 May 1960	1962–63	Winger	2	0	0	0	0				
258	Mike Quick	1946–47	9 November 1946	1947–48	Centre	34	5	10	0 ^²	35				
536	Steve Quinn	1975–76	15 February 1976	1988–89	Centre	393	75	1200	10	2656		CC	(Yorkshire)	fifty-four 3-point tries, and twenty-one 4-point tries, Testimonial match 1985
421	Terry Ramshaw	1961–62	19 August 1961	1965–66	Second-row	100	27	0	0	81			(Yorkshire)	
183	Edmund Ramskill	1939–40	9 March 1940	1947–48	Prop	26	1	0	0	3				
68	Reuben Randall	1926–27	15 January 1927	1928–29	Centre	7	1	0	0	3				
428	Vic Rawes	1962–63	1 September 1962	1964–65	Winger	11	1	0	0	3				
291	Arthur Raybould	1948–49	27 September 1948	1948–49	Hooker	1	0	0	0	0				
522	Steve Raybould	1973–74	25 March 1974	1979–80	Prop	14	3	0	0	9				
966	Gareth Raynor	2012	19 February 2012	2012	Winger	4	3	0	0	12				
820	Stuart Reardon	2002	9 December 2001	2002	Centre	5	0	0	0	0				On loan from Salford
565	Steve Reed	1980–81	17 August 1980	1982–83	Winger	56	9	0	0	27				
11	Norman Reeves	1921–22	27 August 1921	1926–27	Centre	36	5	0	0	15				Born in Streethouse
1091	Jack Render	2019	24 February 2019	2019	Winger	20	6	0	0	24				
1093	Ben Reynolds	2019	10 March 2019	present	Stand-off	22	10	69	0	178				Three spells, namely 2019 (on loan from Wakefield Trinity) & 2024 (on DR loan from Leigh Leopards), and joined 2024
381	Mick Reynolds	1956–57	13 April 1957	1960–61	Winger	24	5	0	0	15				
309	Roslyn Reynolds	1949–50	24 September 1949	1953–54	Prop	9	0	0	0	0				
482	Alan Rhodes	1967–68	2 March 1968	1974–75	Second-row	190	53	1	0 ^²	161		CC		
796	Michael Rhodes	2000	27 December 1999	2001	Fullback	55	19	0	0	76				Australian
835	Andy Rice	2003	19 January 2003	2003	Second-row	32	2	0	0	8				
707	Craig Richards	1993–94	6 March 1994	1993–94	Prop	1	0	0	0	0				On loan from Bradford Bulls
906	Danny Richardson	2007	8 September 2007	2008	Second-row	8	0	0	0	0				Not Danny Richardson (born 1996)
42	Ernest Richardson	1922–23	7 April 1923	1926–27	Centre	18	3	0	0	9				
261	Fred Richardson	1946–47	7 December 1946	1951–52	Loose forward	97	16	0	0	48				
1098	Jorge Richardson	2019	31 March 2019	2019	Stand-off	2	0	0	0	0				
703	Sean Richardson	1993–94	26 September 1993	1993–94	Second-row	1	0	0	0	0				
1068	Martyn Ridyard	2018	4 February 2018	2018	Stand-off	20	8	59	0	150				
782	David Riley	1998	3 October 1998	1998	Winger	3	1	0	0	4				
854	Dean Ripley	2004	23 May 2004	2005	Stand-off	17	4	1	0	18				
1168	Dean Roberts	2024	28 January 2024	2024	Prop	3	1	0	0	4				
254	Lawrence Roberts	1946–47	12 October 1946	1946–47	Second-row	5	0	0	0	0				
544	Graeme Robinson	1977–78	13 November 1977	1980–81	Fullback	42	5	0	0	15				
1069	Shaun Robinson	2018	4 February 2018	2018	Winger	31	17	0	0	68				
596	Tim Robinson	1983–84	19 October 1983	1983–84	Prop	1	0	0	0	0				Younger brother of Graeme Robinson
994	Colton Roche	2014	2 March 2014	2016	Second-row	18	1	0	0	4				2 spells with the club
719	Brett Rodger	1994–95	11 January 1995	1996	Centre	28	11	0	0	44				New Zealander
696	Neil Roebuck	1992–93	28 March 1993	1996	Loose forward	103	11	0	0	44				
71	Herbert Rogerson	1927–28	29 February 1928	1930–31	Prop	83	0	0	0	0				Born in Castleford
611	Mark Roiall	1985–86	29 September 1985	1985–86	Hooker	7	1	0	0	4				New Zealander
723	Eddie Rombo	1995–96	20 August 1995	1997	Winger	56	26	0	0	104				Kenyan
783	Jamie Rooney	1998	3 October 1998	2014	Scrum-half	121	66	479	38	1260				Two spells, namely, 1998-2002 & 2014
669	Iva Ropati	1989–90	24 September 1989	1994–95	Centre	56	31	0	0	124				New Zealander
964	Tangi Ropati	2012	15 February 2012	2012	Winger	16	16	0	0	64				New Zealander
675	Gary Rose	1989–90	31 December 1989	1992–93	Second-row	106	5	0	0	20				
893	Chris Ross	2007	11 February 2007	2007	Stand-off	19	6	10	0	44				
731	Andy Rothwell	1995–96	10 September 1995	1995–96	Winger	5	2	0	0	8				
115	Bill Rowley	1932–33	18 February 1933	1935–36	Winger	37	5	0	0	15				Not Australian Bill Rowley
50	Jim Rudd	1923–24	25 December 1923	1927–28	Scrum-half	57	12	7	0 ^²	50				Born in Oldham
813	James Rushforth	2001	6 May 2001	2001	Centre	4	0	0	0	0				On loan from Halifax RLFC
171	Jimmy Russell	1938–39	1 April 1939	1951–52	Scrum-half	128	26	7	0 ^²	92	(c)			
1016	Matt Ryan	2015	22 February 2015	2015	Prop	1	1	0	0	4				On loan from Wakefield Trinity
192	Bob Rycroft	1940–41	7 December 1940	1945–46	Winger	11	1	0	0	3				Appearances limited by military service
590	Malcolm Saddington	1983–84	4 September 1983	1983–84	Winger	1	0	0	0	0				
1008	Jarrod Sammut	2014	29 June 2014	2014	Fullback	1	0	10	0	20				On loan from Wakefield Trinity
911	Tommy Saxton	2008	3 February 2008	2014	Winger	162	70	0	0	280				
506	Steve Sayer	1971–72	18 September 1971	1973–74	Prop	16	3	0	0	9				
374	Dennis Scholes	1956–57	15 September 1956	1957–58	Winger	43	23	0	0	69				
981	Dave Scott	2013	7 April 2013	2013	Winger	1	1	0	0	4			(Scotland)	
814	Danny Seal	2001	6 May 2001	2003	Loose forward	68	31	0	0	124				
193	Percy Searles	1940–41	21 December 1940	1944–45	scrum-half	20	8	0	0	24				
1136	Jesse Sene-Lefao	2022	31 January 2022	2022	Second-row	16	7	0	0	28				Samoan
165	Gordon Senior	1938–39	24 September 1938	1938–39	Prop	35	0	0	0	0				
713	Lee Senior	1994–95	16 September 1994	1994–95	Fullback	3	1	1	0	6				
41	John Senior	1922–23	30 March 1923	1925–26	Loose forward	8	0	0	0	0				
16	Billy Seymour	1921–22	10 September 1921	1924–25	Utility back	61	2	0	0	6				
724	Jon Sharp	1995–96	20 August 1995	1996	Loose forward/Second-row	27	0	0	0	0				Head coach of Featherstone 2015-17
504	Phil Sharp	1971–72	5 September 1971	1977–78	Prop	16	0	0	0	0				
662	Tim Sharp	1988–89	22 January 1989	1992–93	Stand-off	91	15	6	1	73				Brother of Jon Sharp
983	Will Sharp	2013	28 April 2013	2014	Winger	81	60	1	0	242				Nigerian
406	Henry Sharratt	1959–60	17 August 1959	1960–61	Second-row	4	0	0	0	0				
570	Mark Shaw	1981–82	27 September 1981	1982–83	Hooker	6	0	0	0	0				
821	Martin Shaw	2002	16 December 2001	2002	Second-row	15	2	0	0	8				
75	Norman Shaw	1928–29	13 September 1928	1930–31	Scrum-half	15	0	0	0	0				Born in Featherstone
325	Stan Shaw	1951–52	1 September 1951	1953–54	Stand-off	25	5	7	0 ^²	29				
942	Jode Sheriffe	2010	23 February 2010	2010	Prop	6	0	0	0	0			(Jamaica)	
139	Bill Sherwood	1935–36	29 September 1935	1945–46	Loose forward	205	33	236	0 ^²	571				
881	Gary Shillabeer	2006	12 February 2006	2006	Centre	10	0	0	0	0				
76	Sam Shirley	1928–29	13 October 1928	1928–29	Second-row	17	1	0	0	3				
351	Bill Shreeve	1953–54	19 September 1953	1955–56	Prop	69	0	0	0	0				
551	Gary Siddall	1978–79	10 September 1978	1988–89	Prop	187	26	0	0	93		CC		eleven 3-point tries, and fifteen 4-point tries, Testimonial match 1988
1006	Harry Siejka	2014	15 June 2014	2014	Scrum-half	3	0	4	0	8				On loan from Wakefield Trinity. Australian
1190	Zeus Silk	2024	14 July 2024	2024	Prop	3	0	0	0	0				
792	Wayne Simonds	1999	7 March 1999	1999	Fullback	27	19	0	0	76				
558	Carl Simons	1978–79	4 February 1979	1978–79	Scrum-half	1	0	0	0	0				
470	Alan Simpson	1966–67	19 November 1966	1966–67	Winger	4	1	0	0	3				
807	Nick Simpson	2001	3 December 2000	2001	Centre	14	4	0	0	16				
683	Owen Simpson	1990–91	11 November 1990	1996	Winger	158	98	0	0	392				
717	Jason Sims	1994–95	26 December 1994	1997	Prop	23	0	0	0	0				
329	Alan Sinclair	1951–52	13 October 1951	1953–54	Loose forward	53	9	3	0 ^²	33				Also Hunslet?, and Hull F.C.?
1089	Brad Singleton	2019	10 February 2019	2019	Prop	1	1	0	0	4				On DR loan from Leeds Rhinos
601	Ian Slater	1983–84	9 March 1984	1985–86	Centre	38	6	0	0	24				
631	Martin Slater	1986–87	26 October 1986	1986–87	Hooker	8	1	0	0	4				
733	Richard Slater	1995–96	1 November 1995	1999	Loose forward	111	12	0	0	48				
802	Anthony Slatter	2000	27 February 2000	2000	Winger	2	2	0	0	8				
582	Tim Slatter	1982–83	1 February 1983	1987–88	Prop	76	8	0	0	32		CC		
644	Ian Smales	1987–88	20 September 1987	1997	Utility	166	70	23	0	326			(Yorkshire)	Two spells, namely, 1987-93 & 1997
335	Thomas "Tommy" Smales	1952–53	23 August 1952	1955–56	Scrum-half	130	24	269	0 ^²	610				Head coach of Featherstone 1976, 1978-1979
456	Tommy Smales	1965–66	25 September 1965	1969–70	Loose forward	130	24	269	0	610		CC		Head coach of Featherstone 1974
786	Ben Smallman	1998	17 October 1998	2000	Prop	2	0	0	0	0				
924	Sam Smeaton	2009	15 February 2009	2014	Centre	88	41	0	0	164				
1075	Aaron Smith	2018	15 July 2018	2018	Hooker	3	2	0	0	8				On loan from St Helens
1076	Cameron Smith	2018	15 July 2018	2019	Second-row	5	1	0	0	4				Two loan spells from Leeds Rhinos
200	… Smith	1941–42	11 October 1941	1941–42	Hooker	3	0	0	0	0				Triallist or wartime guest
12	Charlie Smith	1921–22	27 August 1921	1921–22	Fullback	10	0	7	0 ^²	14				
496	Colin Smith	1969–70	14 March 1970	1973–74	Loose forward	44	10	0	0	30				
1001	Daniel Smith	2014	25 May 2014	2023	Prop	25	5	1	0	22				4 separate spells with the club; 3 on loan
241	Derek Smith	1945–46	25 August 1945	1948–49	Centre	69	10	0	0	30				
380	Frank 'Cheyenne' Smith	1956–57	26 January 1957	1960–61	Winger	101	52	0	0	156				
83	Fred Smith	1928–29	23 March 1929	1930–31	Centre	74	21	1	0 ^²	65				Born in Featherstone
130	Harry Smith	1934–35	25 August 1934	1935–36	Loose forward	38	3	0	0	9				
66	Jack W. Smith	1926–27	28 August 1926	1929–30	Utility forward	93	12	0	0	36				Born in Castleford
446	Mick Smith	1964–65	31 October 1964	1976–77	Stand-off	373	114	1	0 ^²	344		CC x 2	(Yorkshire)	
1137	Morgan Smith	2022	31 January 2022	2022	Stand-off	30	22	0	1	89				2 separate spells with the club Grandson of Peter Smith
518	Peter Smith	1973–74	13 January 1974	1989–90	Second-row	419	110	0	1	365	(vc)	CC	(United Kingdom) (England) (Yorkshire)	seventy-six 3-point tries, and thirty-four 4-point tries, Testimonial match 1982
127	Richard E. Smith	1933–34	3 March 1934	1933–34		1	0	0	0	0				
761	Richard Smith	1997	27 July 1997	1997	Fullback	7	2	0	0	8			(Republic of Ireland)	On loan from Salford
84	Sidney Smith	1928–29	30 March 1929	1930–31	Utility forward	12	1	0	0	3				
1031	Steve Snitch	2015	25 July 2015	2016	Second-row	22	3	0	0	12				2 spells with the club
706	Graham Southernwood	1993–94	6 February 1994	1995–96	Hooker	44	9	0	0	36				
869	Jason Southwell	2005	10 April 2005	2005	Prop	7	2	0	0	8				
889	Andy Speake	2006	23 July 2006	2007	Scrum-half	6	0	1	0	2				
926	Tim Spears	2009	18 February 2009	2014	Second-row	201	21	0	0	84	(c)			
635	Paul Spedding	1986–87	4 January 1987	1986–87	Second-row	1	0	0	0	0				
537	Johnny Spells	1975–76	17 March 1976	1978–79	Prop	10	1	0	0	3				
1130	Harvey Spence	2021	20 June 2021	2021	Half-back	4	0	0	0	0				
838	Kevin Spink	2003	30 March 2003	2003	Second-row	1	0	0	0	0				
1133	Gadwin Springer	2021	8 August 2021	present	Prop	63	11	0	0	44				French Guianan
587	Bob Spurr	1983–84	21 August 1983	1987–88	Hooker	108	14	0	0	56				
784	Chris Spurr	1998	3 October 1998	2002	Centre	47	21	0	0	84				
607	Tony Staniforth	1984–85	16 December 1984	1989–90	Hooker	25	4	0	0	16				
872	Danny Stanley	2005	10 July 2005	2005	Prop	1	0	0	0	0				
822	Gareth Stanley	2002	3 February 2002	2002	Hooker	4	0	0	0	0				On loan from Bradford Bulls
460	Cliff Stark	1965–66	11 December 1965	1965–66	Stand-off	4	0	0	0	0				One month trial
627	Graham Steadman	1985–86	16 February 1986	1988–89	Stand-off	96	48	76	6	350			(Yorkshire)	
925	Jon Steel	2009	15 February 2009	2010	Winger	39	25	0	0	100			(Scotland)	
255	Jim Stephenson	1946–47	19 October 1946	1949–50	Second-row	51	3	0	0	9				
257	Peter Stephenson	1946–47	2 November 1946	1948–49	Winger	10	1	0	0	3				
1198	Robson Stevens	2025	25 January 2025	present	Prop	3	0	0	0	0				
389	Peter Stocks	1957–58	26 December 1957	1957–58	Winger	3	1	0	0	3				
743	Jamie Stokes	1996	14 July 1996	2004	Winger	197	117	0	0	468				
501	Charlie Stone	1970–71	14 October 1970	1983–84	Loose forward	262	26	0	0	79		CC	(England) (Yorkshire)	twenty-five 3-point tries, and one 4-point try
630	Peter Storey	1986–87	5 October 1986	1986–87	Stand-off	1	0	0	0	0				On trial
363	Tony Storey	1955–56	19 October 1955	1956–57	Second-row	14	3	0	0	9				
93	Billy Stott	1929–30	29 March 1930	1943–44	Stand-off	108	29	65	0 ^²	217			(Yorkshire)	Played 3 times for Featherstone
21	Fred Stott	1921–22	8 October 1921	1921–22	Winger	4	0	0	0	0				
754	John Strange	1997	9 February 1997	1997	Fullback	23	7	0	0	28				
947	Duane Straugheir	2010	4 July 2010	2010	Centre	2	0	0	0	0				On loan from Bradford Bulls
191	Arthur Street	1940–41	9 November 1940	1946–47	Loose forward	106	25	0	0	75				Brother of Bill & Harry
204	Bill Street	1942–43	24 October 1942	1946–47	Centre	18	3	0	0	9				Brother of Arthur & Harry
391	Harry Street	1957–58	8 February 1958	1957–58	Loose forward	12	0	0	0	0				Brother of Arthur & Bill
857	Adam Sullivan	2004	25 July 2004	2004	Prop	1	0	0	0	0				On loan from Hull KR
532	Tony Sullivan	1975–76	7 September 1975	1975–76	Scrum-half	2	0	0	0	0				On loan from York
1132	Joe Summers	2021	17 July 2021	2021	Prop	2	0	0	0	0				Made his professional debut in 1895 Cup Final at Wembley
740	Neil Summers	1996	19 May 1996	1997	Stand-off	35	11	0	0	44				
1113	Alec Susino	2020	2 February 2020	2020	Prop	6	0	0	0	0				Australian
1090	Alex Sutcliffe	2019	17 February 2019	2021	Centre	19	16	0	0	64				Three DR loans from Leeds Rhinos, 2019, 2020 & 2021
1119	Liam Sutcliffe	2020	8 March 2020	2020	Centre	1	0	0	0	0				On DR loan from Leeds Rhinos
132	Percy Sutcliffe	1934–35	15 September 1934	1934–35	Second-row	28	1	0	0	3				
812	Wayne Sutcliffe	2001	7 March 2001	2006	Second-row	12	0	1	0	2				
853	Brian Sutton	2004	9 May 2004	2007	Centre	24	4	0	0	16				
1118	Jake Sweeting	2020	22 February 2020	2021	Stand-off	4	2	0	0	8				Two loans spells from Castleford Tigers
927	Gareth Swift	2009	22 February 2009	2009	Hooker	2	0	0	0	0				
764	Gavin Swinson	1997	13 August 1997	2008	Hooker	98	29	0	0	116				
629	Andy Sykes	1986–87	14 September 1986	1986–87	Prop	9	1	0	0	4				
652	David Sykes	1987–88	1 January 1988	1988–89	Centre	21	3	0	0	12				
862	Nathan Sykes	2005	13 February 2005	2005	Prop	34	18	104	0	280	(c)		(Yorkshire)	
1014	Paul Sykes	2015	16 February 2015	2015	Stand-off	34	18	104	0	280	(c)			
694	Wayne Taekata	1992–93	27 September 1992	1992–93	Prop	31	0	0	0	0				Australian
1173	Jayden Tanner	2024	25 February 2024	2024	Prop	2	0	0	0	0				Australian
36	Norman Tait	1922–23	26 August 1922	1923–24	Winger	32	5	0	0	15				
94b	Albert Tasker	1930–31	31 January 1931	1930–31	Second-row	2	0	0	0	0				Younger brother of Herbert. On loan from Bradford Northern.
105b	Harry Tasker	1930–31	31 January 1931	1930–31	Second-row	2	0	0	0	0				Younger brother of Herbert & Albert. On loan from Bradford Northern
54	Herbert Tasker	1923–24	8 March 1924	1931–32	Second-row	6	1	0	0	3				
216	… Tate	1943–44	11 December 1943	1943–44	Winger	1	0	0	0	0				Trialist or wartime guest
1040	Misi Taulapapa	2016	7 February 2016	2017	Centre	80	32	0	0	128	(c)			New Zealander
245	Alf Taylor	1945–46	25 December 1945	1945–46	Stand-off	2	0	0	0	0				
452	Colin Taylor	1965–66	21 August 1965	1966–67	Second-row	38	2	1	0 ^²	8				
1154	Elijah Taylor	2023	6 February 2023	2023	Second-row	19	4	0	0	16				New Zealander
53	George Albert Taylor	1923–24	15 January 1924	1931–32	Winger	161	37	2	0 ^²	115				Born in Sharlston or Streethouse
109	George Taylor	1931–32	9 April 1932	1944–45	Second-row	293	22	0	0	66				
181	Reg Taylor	1939–40	2 March 1940	1947–48	Second-row	26	0	0	0	0				
143	Stan Taylor	1935–36	11 April 1936	1935–36	Second-row	2	0	0	0	0				On loan from Wakefield Trinity
996	Luke Teasdale	2014	30 March 2014	2014	Hooker	16	6	0	0	24				
489	Billy Telford	1969–70	8 September 1969	1970–71	Utility back	3	0	0	0	0				
301	Alan Tennant	1948–49	25 December 1948	1959–60	Centre	214	41	0	0	123				Brother of Walter Tennant
545	Clive Tennant	1977–78	29 December 1977	1977–78	Winger	5	1	0	0	3				Son of Walter Tennant
841	Jamie Tennant	2003	13 July 2003	2003	Hooker	1	0	0	0	0				
185	Nelson Tennant	1939–40	26 March 1940	1947–48	Stand-off	9	1	0	0	3				Brother of Walter Tennant
175	Walter Tennant	1939–40	30 August 1939	1950–51	Centre	234	104	4	0 ^²	320			(Yorkshire)	Brother of Alan & Nelson
1177	Leo Tennison	2024	7 April 2024	2024	Prop	6	0	0	0	0				On DR loan from Hull KR
430	Abe Terry	1962–63	15 December 1962	1964–65	Prop	51	2	0	0	6				
1087	Thompson Teteh	2019	3 February 2019	2019	Centre	6	4	0	0	16			(Papua New Guinea)	
919	Anthony Thackeray	2008	20 July 2008	2008	Scrum-half	80	37	0	5	153				
811	Richard Thaler	2001	18 February 2001	2002	Centre	16	9	0	0	36				
439	Vaughan Thomas	1963–64	14 March 1964	1967–68	Winger	108	35	0	0	105				
715	Alex Thompson	1994–95	4 October 1994	1995–96	Scrum-half	4	0	0	0	0				
773	Ian Thompson	1998	4 March 1998	2000	Winger	31	9	0	0	36				
468	Jimmy Thompson	1966–67	1 October 1966	1976–77	Second-row	282	41	0	0	123		CC x 2	(United Kingdom) (England)	
1077	James Thornton	2018	15 July 2018	2018	Second-row	1	0	0	0	0				Trial
477	Michael Thornton	1966–67	28 March 1967	1967–68	Winger	3	0	0	0	0				
546	Gary Tingle	1977–78	24 March 1978	1979–80	Hooker	16	4	0	0	12				
240	Henry Tipton	1944–45	28 April 1945	1944–45	Centre	1	0	0	0	0				
1171	Keenen Tomlinson	2024	11 February 2024	2024	Second-row	9	1	0	0	4			(Jamaica)	
912	Tony Tonks	2008	3 February 2008	2011	Prop	105	18	0	0	72				
819	Ian Tonks	2002	2 December 2001	2008	Prop	172	12	0	0	48	(c)			
594	Kevin Tonks	1983–84	16 October 1983	1983–84	Prop	1	0	0	0	0				Son of Les Tonks
423	Les Tonks	1961–62	9 September 1961	1973–74	Prop	307	15	1	0 ^²	47		CC x 2		
1018	Mason Tonks	2015	1 March 2015	2015	Second-row	6	0	0	0	0				
517	Keith Toohey	1973–74	23 September 1973	1974–75	Centre	16	7	0	0	21				
534	Jeff Townend	1975–76	21 September 1975	1978–79	Prop	31	1	16	1	36				
289	Tommy Townsend	1948–49	21 August 1948	1951–52	Fullback	45	0	76	0 ^²	152				
1000	Kyle Trout	2014	18 May 2014	2014	Prop	16	3	0	0	12				Brother of Owen Trout
1105	Owen Trout	2019	5 June 2019	2019	Second-row	1	0	0	0	0				On DR loan from Leeds Rhinos
435	Dave Tucker	1963–64	15 February 1964	1965–66	Second-row	20	1	0	0	3				
224	Frank Tuffs	1944–45	2 September 1944	1944–45	Prop	1	0	0	0	0				Wartime guest
528	Neil Tuffs	1974–75	8 December 1974	1983–84	Centre	128	25	61	1	198				
523	Robin Tuffs	1973–74	25 March 1974	1978–79	Utility back	26	7	0	0	21				
725	Simon Tuffs	1995–96	20 August 1995	1996	Prop	26	2	0	0	8				
1199	Carlos Tuimavave	2025	25 January 2025	present	Centre	3	1	0	0	4			(Samoa)	New Zealander
524	Graham Tune	1973–74	25 March 1974	1977–78	Second-row	6	0	0	0	0				
1072	Jansin Turgut	2018	15 April 2018	2018	Second-row	2	0	0	0	0			(Turkey)	On loan from Hull FC
1088	Calum Turner	2019	3 February 2019	present	Fullback	10	4	15	0	46				Two spells, namely, 2019 on loan from Castleford Tigers, then 2025
803	Matt Turner	2000	21 May 2000	2001	Winger	7	2	0	0	8				
1176	Paul Turner	2024	23 March 2024	2024	Half-back	13	7	0	0	28				New Zealander
1041	Scott Turner	2016	7 February 2016	2017	Winger	28	19	0	0	76				
455	Vince Turner	1965–66	30 August 1965	1966–67	Stand-off	6	0	0	0	0				
207	Ronald Turton	1942–43	30 January 1943	1943–44	Stand-off	8	2	0	0	6				
681	Brendon Tuuta	1990–91	2 September 1990	1999	Loose forward	179	32	0	1	129			(New Zealand)	
995	Etu Uaisele	2014	2 March 2014	2014	Winger	10	7	0	0	28				Tongan
1054	Chris Ulugia	2017	5 February 2017	2017	Centre	22	11	0	0	44				New Zealander
1028	Ryan Verlinden	2015	17 May 2015	2015	Prop	7	1	0	0	4				Australian
1159	Albert Vete	2023	7 April 2023	2023	Prop	2	0	0	0	0				New Zealander. On loan from Castleford Tigers
539	David Vickers	1976–77	31 October 1976	1980–81	Second-row	56	7	0	0	21				
1203	King Vuniyayawa	2025	9 February 2025	present	Prop	3	1	0	0	4			(Fiji)	
1169	Manoa Wacokecoke	2024	28 January 2024	2024	Winger	11	7	0	0	28				
242	Frank Wagstaffe	1945–46	25 August 1945	1946–47	Prop	48	2	0	0	6				
605	Brian Waites	1984–85	9 December 1984	1985–86	Winger	23	5	0	0	20				
1134	Alex Walker	2021	8 August 2021	2021	Fullback	9	7	0	0	28				On loan from Wakefield Trinity
770	Matt Walker	1998	8 February 1998	1998	Second-row	5	1	0	0	4				On loan from Bradford Bulls
1178	Ajahni Wallace	2024	7 April 2024	2024	Second-row	2	0	0	0	0				On DR loan from Hull KR
1051	Josh Walters	2016	14 August 2016	2019	Second-row	46	15	0	0	60				Four spells; first three on loan from Leeds Rhinos, then signed in 2019
1056	Jason Walton	2017	12 February 2017	2018	Centre	26	13	0	0	52				
219	Ken Walton	1943–44	27 December 1943	1945–46		2	0	0	0	0				
168	Lawrence Walton	1938–39	27 December 1938	1946	Centre	23	1	0	0	3				Appearances limited by WW2 military service
126	Allen Ward	1933–34	24 February 1934	1938–39	Scrum-half	133	20	41	0 ^²	142				
443	Frank Ward	1964–65	19 September 1964	1964–65	Winger	3	0	0	0	0				
575	Garry Ward	1981–82	28 April 1982	1983–84	Prop	6	0	0	0	0				
563	Ged Ward	1979–80	30 March 1980	1979–80	Winger	1	0	0	0	0				
253	Jack Ward	1945–46	2 February 1946	1945–46	Winger	4	0	0	0	0				Trial
894	James Ward	2007	11 February 2007	2007	Second-row	7	1	0	0	4				
359	Jeff Ward	1954–55	12 April 1955	1954–55	Winger	2	0	0	0	0				
1047	Robbie Ward	2016	29 May 2016	2016	Hooker	5	0	0	0	0				On loan from Leeds Rhinos
643	Sean Ward	1986–87	20 April 1987	1986–87	Scrum-half	1	0	0	0	0				
57	Tom Ward	1924–25	20 September 1924	1932–33	Winger	34	5	0	0	15				
372	Walter Ward	1956–57	5 September 1956	1963–64	Hooker	77	1	0	0	3				
278	Jack Waring	1947–48	22 November 1947	1948–49	Centre	21	8	1	0 ^²	26				Lost in all 21 games
248	Jim Waring	1945–46	5 January 1946	1945–46	Loose forward	3	0	0	0	0				
1189	Toby Warren	2024	7 July 2024	2024	Second-row	2	0	0	0	0				On loan from Leeds Rhinos
81	William Warrington	1928–29	26 January 1929	1929–30	Fullback	5	0	0	0	0				Born in Featherstone
422	Gary Waterworth	1961–62	30 August 1961	1963–64	Winger	68	33	0	0	99			(Yorkshire)	Died c. 31 December 2018.
303	Alf Watson	1948–49	5 March 1949	1948–49	Loose forward	3	1	0	0	3				
475	Alan Watts	1966–67	11 March 1967	1967–68	Scrum-half	6	0	0	0	0				
306	Stan Watts	1949–50	27 August 1949	1949–50	Centre	9	0	1	0 ^²	2				
1200	Clay Webb	2025	23 February 2025	present	Second-row	4	4	0	0	16				Australian
799	Mark Webster	2000	3 January 2000	2000	Prop	2	0	0	0	0				Trial
863	Josh Weeden	2005	13 February 2005	2006	Stand-off	34	13	31	2	116				Australian
597	Chris Welburn	1983–84	19 October 1983	1983–84	Winger	1	0	0	0	0				Nickname 'Wizzer'
298	Ken Welburn	1948–49	20 November 1948	1957–58	Prop	263	12	0	0	36				
1125	Kris Welham	2021	27 March 2021	2021	Centre	16	5	0	0	20				Brother of Liam
935	Liam Welham	2010	7 February 2010	2011	Centre	30	21	0	0	84				
111	George Westwood	1932–33	29 October 1932	1932–33	Prop	10	0	0	0	0				Occasionally misnamed C. Westwood
442	Graham Westwood	1964–65	29 August 1964	1966–67	Winger	38	6	0	0	18				
541	Ian Westwood	1977–78	2 September 1977	1979–80	Winger	8	1	0	0	3				Cousin of Graham Westwood
874	Scott Wheeldon	2005	24 July 2005	2019	Prop	41	1	0	0	4				Two spells, namely 2005 on loan from Hull FC, and then 2018-19
671	Lee Whiteley	1989–90	22 October 1989	1992–93	Hooker	11	1	0	0	4				
1131	Perry Whiteley	2021	20 June 2021	2021	Winger	2	1	0	0	4				On loan from York Knights
337	Frank Whitemore	1952–53	6 September 1952	1953–54	Hooker	5	0	0	0	0				
836	Richard Whiting	2003	2 March 2003	2003	Stand-off	18	2	6	0	20				
69	George Whittaker	1927–28	15 October 1927	1929–30	Centre	88	26	1	0 ^²	80				Born in Fitzwilliam
895	Jon Whittle	2007	11 February 2007	2007	Centre	28	13	0	0	52				
210	Wilfred Whitworth	1943–44	4 September 1943	1944–45	Centre	46	8	1	0 ^²	26	(c)			Wartime guest
1078	Dakota Whylie	2018	28 July 2018	2018	Winger	8	2	0	0	8				
674	Karl Widdison	1989-92	31 December 1989	1989-90		25	0	0	0	0				
633	Paul Wild	1986–87	9 November 1986	1987–88	Winger	17	2	0	0	8				From Southport Tigers?
900	Loz Wildbore	2007	20 May 2007	2008	Fullback	42	13	7	2	68				
1206	Nathan Wilde	2025	30 March 2025	2025	Prop	4	0	0	0	0				On loan from Leigh Leopards
1055	Matty Wildie	2017	5 February 2017	2023	Hooker	118	29	0	0	116				Two spells, namely, 2016-18 & 2022-23
137	Jack Wildman	1934–35	20 April 1935	1934–35	Second-row	2	0	0	0	0				Trial
333	Brian Wildridge	1951–52	22 March 1952	1954–55	Winger	16	8	0	0	24				
762	Simon Wileman	1997	27 July 1997	1998	Second-row	14	0	0	0	0				
86	Fred Wilford	1929–30	31 August 1929	1932–33	Fullback	5	0	0	0	0				Brother of Les
91	Les Wilford	1929–30	8 February 1930	1929–30	Winger	3	1	0	0	3				Brother of Fred
453	Eddie Wilkins	1965–66	28 August 1965	1965–66	Fullback	1	0	0	0	0				
24	Billy Williams	1921–22	22 October 1921	1921–22	Second-row	2	0	0	0	0				
484	Dave Williams	1968–69	2 September 1968	1971–72	Winger	36	13	0	0	39				
953	Dave Williams	2011	26 February 2011	2011	Prop	5	0	0	0	0				On loan from London Broncos
113	Harry Williams	1932–33	26 November 1932	1932–33	Hooker	7	0	0	0	0				
13	Jimmy Williams	1921–22	27 August 1921	1928–29	Stand-off	211	30	120	0 ^²	330				Born in Featherstone
1201	Jordan Williams	2025	25 January 2025	present	Prop	4	0	0	0	0				
946	Gareth Williamson	2010	4 March 2010	2010	Prop	1	1	0	0	4				
785	Lee Williamson	1998	3 October 1998	2004	Prop	26	0	0	0	0				
691	Mark Wilson	1992–93	23 September 1992	1993–94	Hooker	33	2	0	0	8	(c)			
515	Ray Wilson	1972–73	27 October 1972	1974–75	Utility back	31	5	0	0	15				
902	Scott Wilson	2007	24 June 2007	2009	Winger	11	0	0	0	0				
716	Warren Wilson	1994–95	27 November 1994	1996	Centre	29	9	1	0	38				
173	Charles Windmill	1938–39	29 April 1939	1938–39	Prop	1	0	0	0	0				Career interrupted by WW2
583	...	...	...	...										unallocated
461	Sam Windmill	1965–66	1 January 1966	1982–83	Prop	69	8	1	0	26				birth registered third ¼ 1946 (age 79–80) in Pontefract district
92	Ernest "Ernie" Winter	1929–30	1 March 1930	1939–40	Centre	93	18	0	0	54			(England) (Yorkshire)	
59	George Withrington	1924–25	27 September 1924	1925–26	Centre	9	1	0	0	3				
286	Arthur Wood	1947–48	14 February 1948	1950–51	Hooker	105	1	0	0	3			(England) (Yorkshire)	
34	Charles Wood	1921–22	18 March 1922	1923–24	Stand-off	4	0	0	0	0				
513	Colin Wood	1972–73	17 September 1972	1974–75	Scrum-half	18	1	0	0	3				
222	Harold Wood	1943–44	26 February 1944	1946–47	Prop	37	2	0	0	6				
1015	Paul Wood	2015	16 February 2015	2015	Prop	15	0	0	0	0				
370	Cyril Woolford	1955–56	7 April 1956	1960–61	Winger	185	88	0	0	264			(Yorkshire)	Father of Neil
604	Neil Woolford	1984–85	7 October 1984	1987–88	Winger	45	7	0	0	28				Nickname 'Chocco'. Son of Cyril Woolford
28	Bert Woolley	1921–22	17 December 1921	1928–29	Utility forward	196	8	0	0	24				
22	Edgar Woolley	1921–22	8 October 1921	1921–22	Winger	1	0	0	0	0				Born in Castleford
486	Robert Worsley	1968–69	16 November 1968	1968–69	Stand-off	1	0	0	0	0				
950	Greg Worthington	2011	4 February 2011	2020	Centre	107	56	0	0	224				Two spells, 2011-14 & 2020
620	Simon Wragg	1985–86	22 December 1985	1985–86	Winger	4	0	0	0	0				
847	Matt Wray	2004	1 February 2004	2006	Winger	72	33	0	0	132				
466	Brian Wrigglesworth	1966–67	29 August 1966	1970–71	Fullback	66	11	1	0 ^²	35		CC		
579	Craig Wright	1982–83	17 October 1982	1982–83	Hooker	8	0	0	0	0				
221	Ernie Wright	1943–44	19 February 1944	1946–47	Second-row	62	8	42	0 ^²	108			(Yorkshire)	
249	Herbert Wright	1945–46	12 January 1946	1945–46	Winger	2	0	0	0	0			(Yorkshire)	
23	Tom Wynard	1921–22	15 October 1921	1924–25	Loose forward	101	11	78	0 ^²	189				From Batley in 1921
883	Dale Wynne	2006	5 March 2006	2007	Winger	5	1	0	0	4				
1170	Connor Wynne	2024	28 January 2024	present	Winger	26	21	0	0	84				
1155	McKenzie Yei	2023	6 February 2023	2024	Prop	20	5	0	0	20			(Papua New Guinea)	
851	Frédéric Zitter	2004	2 May 2004	2004		19	8	0	0	32			(France)	

- ^¹ = Played For Featherstone Rovers During More Than One Period
- ^² = Prior to the 1974–75 season all goals, whether; conversions, penalties, or drop-goals, scored two points, consequently prior to this date drop-goals were often not explicitly documented, and "0 ²" indicates that drop-goals may not have been recorded, rather than no drop-goals scored. In addition, prior to the 1949–50 season, the Field-goal was also still a valid means of scoring points.
- BBC = BBC2 Floodlit Trophy
- CC = Challenge Cup
- CF = Championship Final
- CM = Captain Morgan Trophy
- RT = League Cup, i.e. Player's № 6, John Player (Special), Regal Trophy
- YC = Yorkshire Cup
- YL = Yorkshire League
