= Michael Rhodes =

Michael or Mike Rhodes may refer to:

- Michael D. Rhodes (born 1946), associate professor of ancient scripture at Brigham Young University
- Michael Rhodes (rugby league), Scottish rugby league player
- Michael Rhodes (rugby union) (born 1987), South African rugby union player
- Michael Rhodes (musician) (1953–2023), American bass guitarist
- Mike Rhodes (American football), American football quarterback
- Mike Rhodes (fighter), American mixed martial artist
