= Andy Bostock =

English rugby league footballer

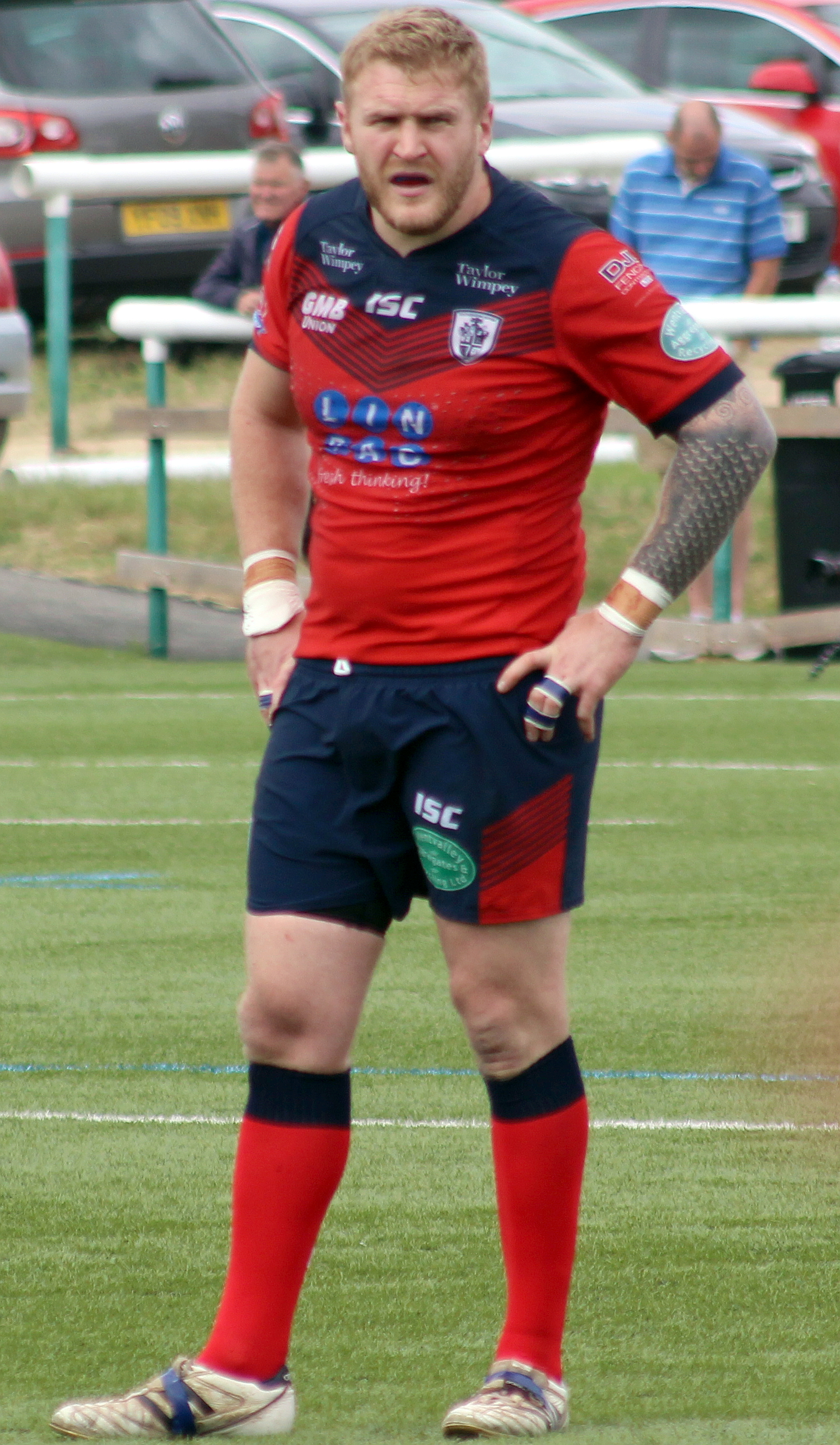

Personal information
- Full name: Andrew Bostock
- Born: 25 February 1985 (age 40)
- Height: 6 ft 3 in (191 cm)
- Weight: 17 st 5 lb (110 kg)

Playing information
- Position: Centre, Prop, Second-row
Club
Years	Team	Pld	T	G	FG	P
	Thornhill Trojans
2007–10	Dewsbury Rams	81	48	0	0	192
2011–17	Featherstone Rovers	149	42	0	0	168
	Total	230	90	0	0	360
- Source: As of 26 June 2017

Andrew Bostock (born 25 February 1985) is a professional rugby league footballer who has played in the 2000s and 2010s. He has played at club level for Thornhill Trojans, Dewsbury, and Featherstone Rovers (Heritage 948), as a centre, second-row, or prop.
