= Gary Shillabeer =

English rugby league footballer

Personal information
- Full name: Gary Shillabeer
- Born: 23 November 1979 (age 46)

Playing information
- Position: Second-row
Club
Years	Team	Pld	T	G	FG	P
1999	Huddersfield Giants	2	0	0	0	0
2001–05	Batley Bulldogs	49	8	0	0	32
2002(loan)	→ Gateshead Thunder	5	0	0	0	0
2004(loan)	→ Hunslet Hawks	9	2	0	0	8
2006	Featherstone Rovers	10	0	0	0	0
	Total	75	10	0	0	40

Gary Shillabeer is a former professional rugby league footballer who played in the 1990s and 2000s. He played at club level for Stanley Rangers ARLFC, Huddersfield Giants, Batley Bulldogs (two spells), Hunslet Hawks, and Featherstone Rovers (Herirage № 881), as a second-row.

== Playing career ==
=== Club career ===
Gary Shillabeer played for Huddersfield Giants in 1999's Super League IV. Gary Shillabeer made his début for Featherstone Rovers on Sunday 12 February 2006.

== Note ==
Gary's surname is variously spelled as Shillabeer and Shillabear.
