= Lee Child (rugby league) =

Ireland international rugby league footballer

Personal information
- Born: 28 September 1974 (age 51)

Playing information
- Position: Wing
Club
Years	Team	Pld	T	G	FG	P
1993–96	Wakefield Trinity	36	9	0	0	36
1996	Hull FC	1	0	0	0	0
1997	Hunslet	15	7	0	0	28
1998	Featherstone Rovers	9	3	0	0	12
	Total	61	19	0	0	76
Representative
Years	Team	Pld	T	G	FG	P
1995–98	Ireland	4	2	0	0	8

Lee Child (born 28 September 1974) is a former professional rugby league footballer who played in the 1990s. He played at representative level for Ireland, and at club level for Wakefield Trinity, Hull FC, Hunslet, and Featherstone Rovers as a wing.

== International honours ==
Child won four caps for Ireland between 1995 and 1998.
