= Jos McGlone =

English rugby league footballer

Personal information
- Full name: Jos McGlone
- Born: Kingston upon Hull, England

Playing information
- Position: Stand-off
Club
Years	Team	Pld	T	G	FG	P
192?–24	Hull KR
1924–23/24	Featherstone Rovers	16	4	0	0	12
	Total	16	4	0	0	12

Joseph McGlone, also known by the nickname of "Josh ", was a professional rugby league footballer who played in the 1920s. He played at club level for Featherstone Rovers.

== Playing career ==
Jos McGlone made his début for Featherstone Rovers on Tuesday 15 January 1924.
