= Wilfred Whitworth =

English rugby league footballer

Wilf Whitworth
Personal information
- Full name: Wilfred Whitworth
- Born: third ¼ 1914 Oldham, England
- Died: unknown

Playing information
- Height: 5 ft 10 in (1.78 m)
- Weight: 12 st 2 lb (77 kg)
- Position: Centre
Club
Years	Team	Pld	T	G	FG	P
1932–35	Oldham	22	3	0	0	9
1935–36	Hull Kingston Rovers	36	6	10	0	38
1936–42/43	Wakefield Trinity	107	28	1	0	86
1943–45(guest)	→ Featherstone Rovers	46	8	1	0	26
	Total	211	45	12	0	159

Wilfred Whitworth (third ¼ 1914 – death unknown) was an English professional rugby league footballer who played in the 1930s and 1940s. He played at club level for Oldham, Wakefield Trinity, and Featherstone Rovers (World War II guest), as a centre.

== Playing career ==
Wilfred Whitworth made his début for Wakefield Trinity during December 1936, he made his début for Featherstone Rovers on Saturday 4 September 1943.
