= Nathan Chappell =

English rugby league footballer

Personal information
- Full name: Nathan Chappell
- Born: 4 December 1989 (age 36) Huddersfield, West Yorkshire, England
- Height: 186 cm (6 ft 1 in)
- Weight: 95 kg (14 st 13 lb)

Playing information
- Position: Centre, Second-row
Club
Years	Team	Pld	T	G	FG	P
2011–12	Featherstone Rovers	12	14	0	0	56
2015–16	Featherstone Rovers	12	7	0	0	28
2016	Sheffield Eagles	9	6	0	0	24
2017	Oldham	0	0	0	0	0
2018–19	Hunslet	18	14	0	0	56
2018–	Hunslet	12	8	1	0	34
	Total	63	49	1	0	198

Nathan Chappell (born 4 December 1989) is an English professional rugby league footballer who plays for Hunslet in League 1.

Previous clubs represented include Featherstone Rovers, the Sheffield Eagles and Oldham.

He began his career at Newsome Panthers at the age of 7 where he played until he signed at the Huddersfield Giants aged 17. After 3-years at the club, 1 year at the Castleford Tigers, and a 2-year stint at Featherstone Rovers, he moved to Australia to play in the Canberra Raiders Cup with the Goulburn Workers Bulldogs. He also represented the Canberra team. He played there for 2-years before returning to England where he signed for Featherstone Rovers once again.

Chappell has arguably the fastest recorded hat-trick in rugby league (Featherstone v York, minutes 73–78), along with old teammate Greg Eden (Castleford v Leigh, minutes 33–38), which are both within a 5-minute period.

His preferred position is centre, followed by second-row.

Chappell attended Newsome High School and Sports College.
