= Norman Shaw (rugby league) =

English rugby league footballer (??–??)

Personal information
- Born: unknown Featherstone, Wakefield, England

Playing information
- Height: 5 ft 6 in (1.68 m)
- Weight: 10 st 7 lb (67 kg)
Club
Years	Team	Pld	T	G	FG	P
1928–30/31	Featherstone Rovers	15	0	0	0	0

Norman Shaw (birth and death dates unknown) was a professional rugby league footballer who played in the 1920s and 1930s. He played at club level for Featherstone Rovers.

== Background ==
Norman Shaw was born in Featherstone, Wakefield, West Riding of Yorkshire, England.

== Club career ==
Norman Shaw made his début for Featherstone Rovers on Thursday 13 September 1928.
