= Robert Jarvis (rugby league) =

English rugby league footballer

Personal information
- Born: unknown

Playing information
Club
Years	Team	Pld	T	G	FG	P
1949–53	Featherstone Rovers	33	2	0	0	3

Robert Jarvis (birth unknown) is a former professional rugby league footballer who played in the 1940s and 50s. He played at club level for Featherstone Rovers.

== Club career ==
Robert Jarvis made his début for the Featherstone Rovers on Saturday 12 November 1949.
