= Scott Turner (rugby league) =

English rugby league footballer (born 1988)

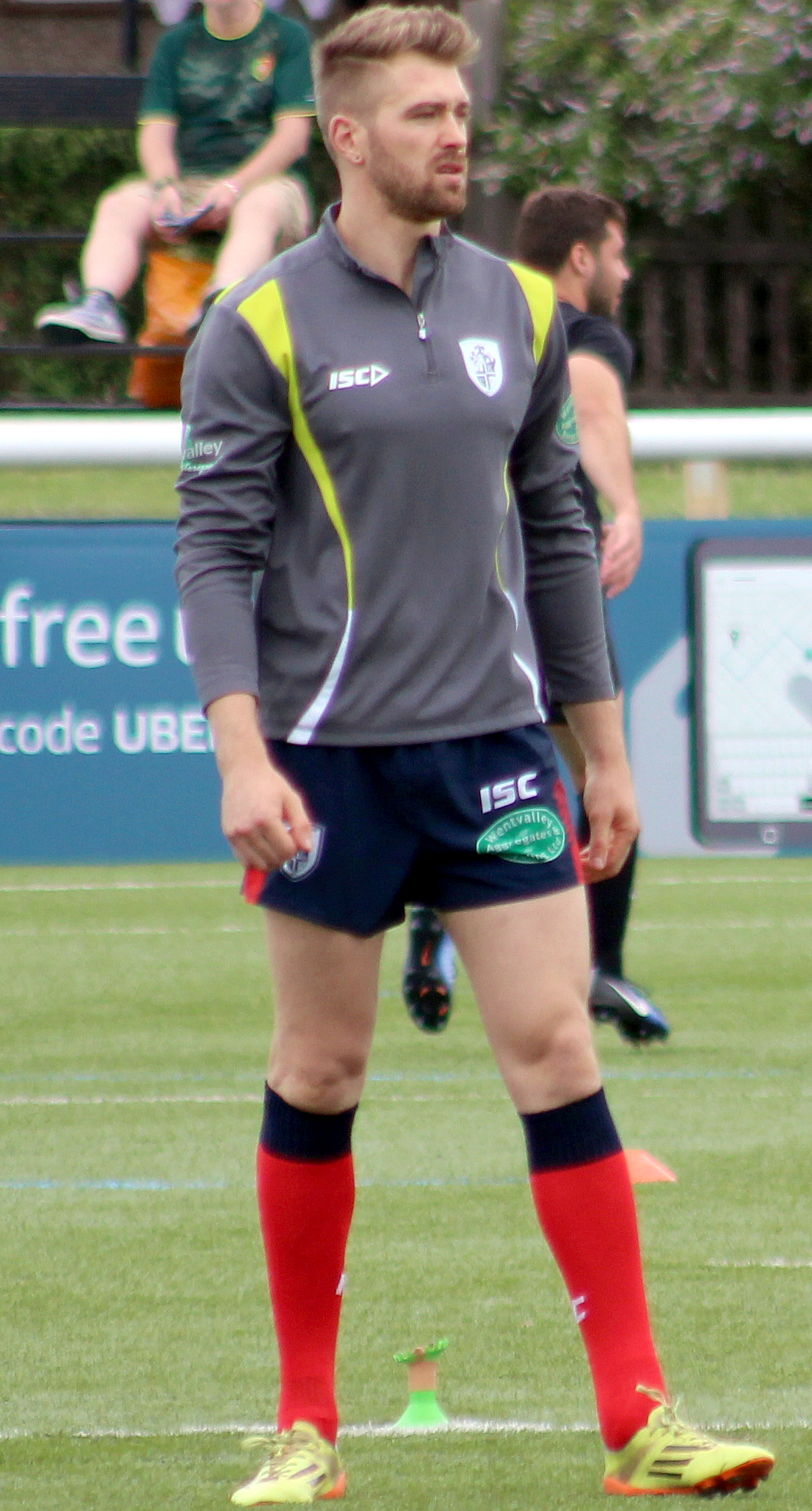

Personal information
- Full name: Scott Turner
- Born: 15 April 1988 (age 38)
- Height: 6 ft 2 in (188 cm)
- Weight: 14 st 2 lb (90 kg)

Playing information
- Position: Wing, Centre, Fullback
Club
Years	Team	Pld	T	G	FG	P
2010–11	Dewsbury Rams	44	16	2	0	68
2012–15	Sheffield Eagles	107	70	0	0	280
2016–17	Featherstone Rovers	21	17	0	0	68
	Total	172	103	2	0	416
- Source: As of 9 July 2017

Scott Turner (born 15 April 1988) is a professional rugby league footballer who most recently played for Featherstone Rovers in the Kingstone Press Championship. He plays as a wing, centre or fullback.

Turner has previously played at the Dewsbury Rams and Sheffield Eagles in the Championship.
