= Michael Rhodes (rugby league) =

English rugby league footballer

Personal information
- Full name: Michael Rhodes

Playing information
- Position: Fullback
Club
Years	Team	Pld	T	G	FG	P
1999–01	Featherstone Rovers	55	19	0	0	76
- As of 23 Jul 2021

Michael Rhodes (birth unknown) is a former professional rugby league footballer who played in the 1990s and 2000s. He played at club level for Featherstone Rovers, as a fullback. Rhodes was selected for the Scotland squad for the 2000 Rugby League World Cup, but he did not play in any of Scotland's three matches.

Rhodes made his début for Featherstone Rovers on Monday 27 December 1999, and he played his last match for Featherstone Rovers during the 2001–season.
