= 1980 Challenge Cup final =

Rugby league match in England

1980 Challenge Cup Final
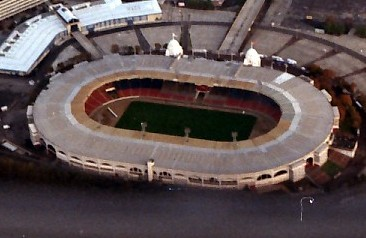
- The final took place at Wembley Stadium
Hull F.C.	Hull Kingston Rovers
5	10
	1	2	Total
HUL	3	2	5
HKR	8	2	10
- Date: 3 May 1980
- Stadium: Wembley Stadium
- Location: London, United Kingdom
- Lance Todd Trophy winner: Brian Lockwood
- Abide with Me and God Save The Queen: Windsor Davies; Melvyn Hayes; Band of the Welsh Guards
- Referee: Fred Lindop
- Attendance: 95,000

Broadcast partners
- Broadcasters: BBC 1 (Grandstand)
- Commentators: Eddie Waring Alex Murphy

The 1980 Challenge Cup Final was the 79th final of the Rugby Football League's Challenge Cup knock-out competition. The match was contested by Hull F.C. and Hull Kingston Rovers on 3 May 1980 at Wembley Stadium in London, and was the first ever Hull derby cup final, contended between the two cross-city rival rugby league clubs of Kingston upon Hull.

== Background ==
The Boulevard and Old Craven Park, the home venues of the two rugby clubs of Kingston upon Hull in 1980, were located on the west and east sides of the River Hull respectively

Hull F.C. and Hull Kingston Rovers (originally Kingston Amateurs) were founded as rugby union clubs in 1865 and 1882 respectively on the west and east sides of Kingston upon Hull. Hull F.C. were founding members of the Northern Rugby Football Union and the breakaway code of rugby league in 1895, with Rovers joining two years later in 1897 after controversy over alleged professionalism (which was banned in rugby union) in their Yorkshire Cup win in 1897. The first meeting of both teams was at Rovers' Craven Street Football Ground on 16 September 1899, which ended in a 8–2 victory to Rovers.

Hull F.C. had won their first Challenge Cup at Thrum Hall in Halifax in 1914, appearing as runners-up in 1908, 1909, 1910 (which necessitated a replay), 1922, 1923, 1959 and 1960, the latter two being their first Wembley appearances. Hull Kingston Rovers, meanwhile, had previously been runners-up in Challenge Cup Finals in 1905 and 1925 at Headingley and in 1964 at Wembley.

There had been nine Hull derby Challenge Cup ties ahead of the 1979–80 Challenge Cup, with fixtures played in 1902, 1922, 1939, 1959, 1961, 1972, 1974, 1977 and 1978. The two clubs had also met in the finals of the Yorkshire Cup (1920 and 1967) and the BBC2 Floodlit Trophy (1979).

== Route to the final ==
=== Hull F.C. ===
Having been promoted from the Second Division a year prior, after a first half in which Cumbrian amateur side Millom opened a shock early 5–0 lead at The Boulevard, Hull F.C. won their home first round fixture 33–10 with a hat-trick of tries from Ron Wileman as well as tries from Graham Evans and Clive Pickerill and five goals from Sammy Lloyd, and were drawn into the second round at home against York. York also initially led Hull F.C. to a shock lead in the first half, however F.C. overcame the York defence and won 18–8 through attacking play by captain Steve Norton and six goals, three of them penalties, by Sammy Lloyd.

Entering the quarter-finals of the competition, Hull F.C. travelled away to Odsal Stadium to play Bradford Northern, a team they had not won against for the past four years. A highly defensive match saw only a penalty scored by Sammy Lloyd 12 minutes into the first half after an illegal tackle on Ron Wileman, followed by a decisive drop goal in the 75th minute by Clive Pickerill, allowing F.C. to win 3–0 and qualify them for the semi-finals of the Challenge Cup for the first time since 1961.

Travelling to the neutral venue of Station Road in Pendlebury, a week after Rovers' qualification for the final, F.C. faced 'cup kings' and defending 1979 winners Widnes. Following another defensive game in which F.C. were behind the favourites 0–5 at half-time, an early second-half try by Graham Bray, two penalty kicks by Sammy Lloyd and a match-winning try by Ron Wileman in the last ten minutes saw Hull F.C. overturn the deficit and win 10–5, setting up the first Hull derby Challenge Cup final and returning F.C. to Wembley for the first time since 1960.

Round	Opposition	Venue	Score
Round 1	Millom	The Boulevard	33–10
Round 2	York	The Boulevard	18–8
Quarter-final	Bradford Northern	Odsal Stadium	3–0
Semi-final	Widnes	Station Road	10–5

=== Hull Kingston Rovers ===
Hull Kingston Rovers opened their Challenge Cup campaign with a dominant 18–13 victory over Wigan away at Central Park, featuring tries by Steve Hartley, Clive Sullivan and Phil Lowe as well as goals kicked by Steve Hubbard, followed by a 28–3 thrashing of Castleford in Round 2 at home at Craven Park. Rovers played at home again for the quarter-final against Warrington, in which following an evenly-matched first half, Rovers won the match 23–11 with the contributions of man of the match Steve Hubbard, scoring two tries and kicking five goals, qualifying Rovers for their second Challenge Cup semi-final in three years.

Rovers travelled to the neutral venue of Headingley Rugby Stadium to face Halifax in the first semi-final of the Challenge Cup. A dominant display by Rovers over Halifax saw the match virtually won by half-time, with tries by Clive Sullivan, Mike Smith and Steve Hartley, two goals by Steve Hubbard and a drop-goal by player-coach and captain Roger Millward ending the match at 20–7 and sending Rovers to Wembley for their first Challenge Cup final since 1964.

Round	Opposition	Venue	Score
Round 1	Wigan	Central Park	18–13
Round 2	Castleford	Craven Park	28–3
Quarter-final	Warrington	Craven Park	23–11
Semi-final	Halifax	Headingley Rugby Stadium	20–7

== Pre-match ==
=== Teams ===
Hull F.C. and Hull Kingston Rovers finished the regular season in mid-April placed 3rd and 7th respectively, qualifying them for the Premiership but narrowly avoiding a first round derby fixture, which neither team wanted to play, on points difference. Both teams departed from their home stadiums on coaches for London on 30 April. Hull F.C. stayed at the Royal Chace Hotel in Enfield and trained at the Botany Bay Cricket Club, while Hull Kingston Rovers stayed at the Runneymede Hotel in Egham, establishing a training base within sight of Windsor Castle at the home of rugby union club Windsor R.F.C.

Both squads were largely unchanged from their last First Division fixtures. Hull Kingston Rovers second-row Phil Lowe suffered a dislocated arm from an off-the-ball tackle in a First Division fixture against St Helens two weeks before the final, but was eventually ruled fit to play 48 hours before the final. Hull F.C. centre Gareth Evans, however, tore a muscle in training and was ruled out of F.C.'s squad.

Both teams were cleared to wear their traditional home kits for the final, with Hull F.C. playing in jerseys with irregular black and white hoops and white shorts and Hull Kingston Rovers playing in white jerseys with a broad red band; F.C.'s previous Challenge Cup final losses in 1959 and 1960 had seen them wear white jerseys with a black 'V' and hoops with black shorts, while Rovers made their 1964 Wembley appearance in all-red shirts.

=== Transport ===
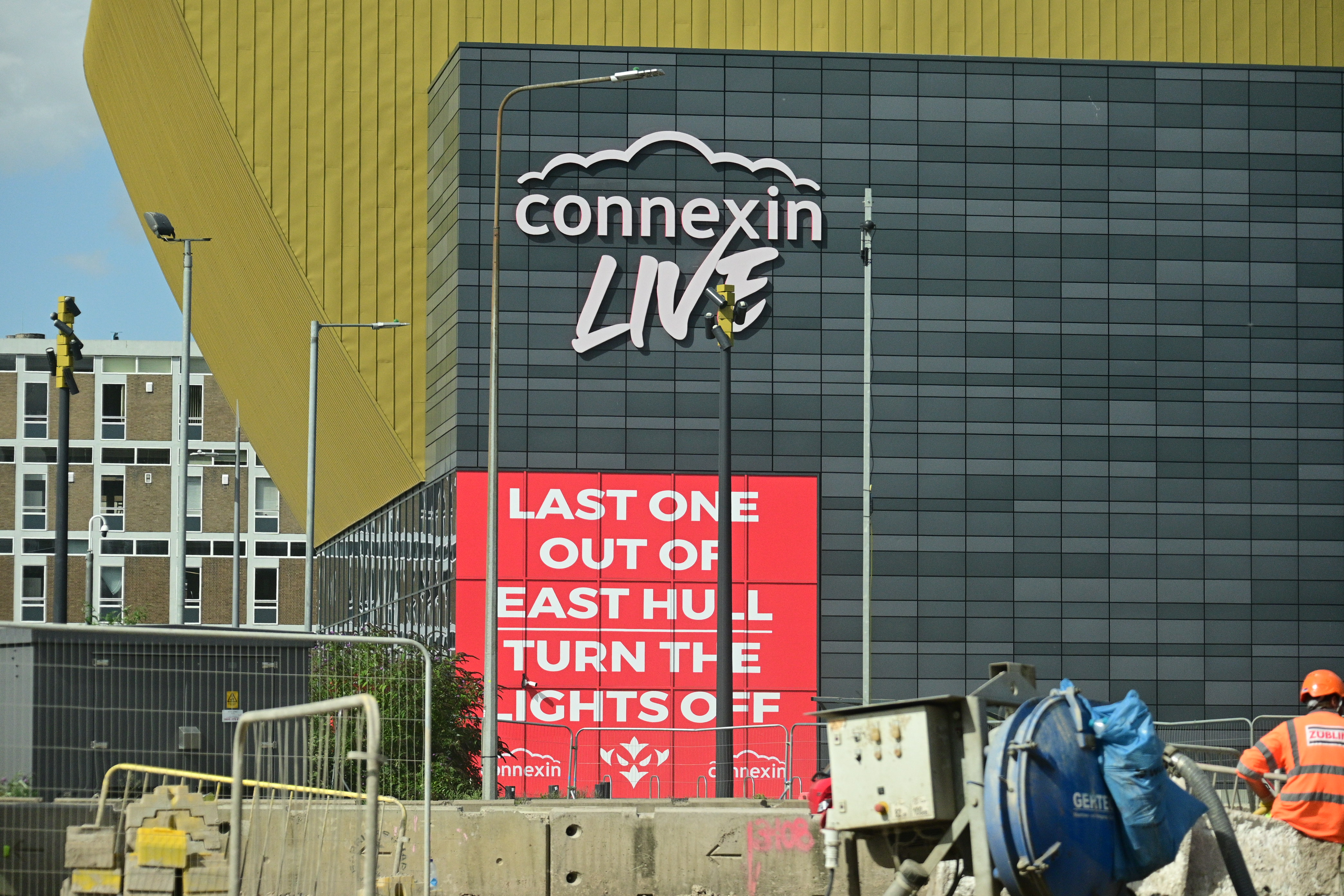
A tribute to the 'Last one out, turn the lights off' banner displayed at the Connexin Live Arena prior to Hull Kingston Rovers' appearance at the 2023 final

By 1980, the city of Kingston upon Hull had a population of 327,000, and it was estimated that up to a quarter of the city's population travelled to Wembley. Both teams had ticket allocations of 22,000 each, however, club retailers soon found themselves out of their depth as demand outstripped supply, with fans queuing for general admittance tickets overnight at both The Boulevard and Craven Park. Within two weeks, both allocations were mostly sold out, and a fortnight before the final, the RFL announced that all 95,000 tickets had sold out in record time, only the fourth Challenge Cup final to do so.

British Rail organised twelve special trains that departed in fifteen-minute intervals on the morning of 3 May from Hull Paragon railway station to various London stations, operating alongside the eight regular trains chartered for a Challenge Cup final day. Three also departed Hull Paragon on the Friday night before, with further departures occurring on Thursday. Tickets were worth £12, colour-coded to segregate rival fans, and no refreshments, transfers or open returns were offered. As the first trains arrived on Thursday to take supporters to Wembley, Hull Paragon railway station was described as being "like a refugee clearing centre", with fans travelling in mixed groups of families and friends despite British Rail's attempts at segregation. Ten car transporters were also brought to Hull to deliver hire cars for those who wanted to drive to Wembley.

On the night before the final, supporters Fred Lewis, Dean Lewis and Charlie Grantham placed an improvised cardboard sign reading 'Last one out turn the lights off' against a lamppost on Boothferry Road near the under-construction Humber Bridge.

=== Guests and entertainment ===
Dignitaries and guests in attendance included Queen Elizabeth the Queen Mother, who greeted both teams on the pitch before kick-off and later presented the Challenge Cup trophy to the winning Hull Kingston Rovers player-coach, Roger Millward. Among other attendees included members of the Labour-run Kingston upon Hull City Council – sitting council leader Pat Doyle, former leader Leo Schultz, councillor Louis Pearlman and town clerk Basil Wood – and politicians and celebrities from across the North of England and beyond, including Dave Allen, Bernie Clifton, Brian Glover, Richard Harris, Emlyn Hughes, Bernard Manning, Bill Maynard, Cliff Morgan, Peter O'Toole, Michael Parkinson, Alan Plater, Jean Rook, Jimmy Savile, Cyril Smith, Ed Stewart, Bill Tidy, Colin Welland and Kenneth Wolstenholme, some of whom had attended previous finals.

Pre-match entertainment at Wembley was provided by actors from the BBC 1 sitcom It Ain't Half Hot Mum Windsor Davies and Melvyn Hayes, who also sang the traditional Challenge Cup anthem Abide With Me with the backing of the Band of the Welsh Guards. The Queen Mother's appearance at the final meant that the national anthem, God Save the Queen, was sung immediately on her entry with the instrumentation of the Band of the Welsh Guards, as opposed to after both teams were greeted on the pitch.

== Match ==
=== Summary ===
After Queen Elizabeth the Queen Mother left the pitch following a lengthy greeting of both teams, a coin toss was won by Hull Kingston Rovers and referee Fred Lindop whistled for play to get underway, with Rovers scrum-half Allan Agar kicking into Hull F.C.'s half of the pitch. F.C. fullback Paul Woods received Agar's kick and made a drive against Rovers' defensive line, eventually being tackled by second-rowers Phil Lowe and Paul Rose. After further drives into Rovers' defence by prop Keith Tindall and prop forward Charlie Stone, passes by loose forward Steve Norton and second-rowers Charlie Birdsall and Sammy Lloyd allowed scrum-half Clive Pickerill to cross the halfway line into Rovers' half, however he lost the ball under pressure from a tackle by Rovers hooker David Watkinson, handing possession to Rovers in the first of many errors from both teams; in the first five minutes of play, six errors and three penalties were conceded.

Steve Hubbard opened the scoring for Hull Kingston Rovers after nine minutes; in a tactic nicknamed 'oranges' by the Rovers squad during training, when Watkinson restarted play at the 35-yard line after F.C. centre Graham Walters conceded a penalty for being offside, he passed to prop Roy Holdstock, who passed to Agar, who then made a dummy pass that was then received by Hubbard, breaking through F.C.'s defence and scoring the first try in the left-hand corner of F.C.'s tryline. His conversion kick attempt went wide left of the posts, leaving the score at 0–3. (Note: Until 1983, tries in rugby league were worth three points.) As the squads lined up for the restart, referee Lindop then awarded Rovers a penalty due to Woods tackling Hubbard over the try-line after the ball had been grounded; Hubbard, in front of the posts, kicked the penalty to score two more points, with the scoreline now 0–5 in Rovers' favour after over ten minutes had been played.

A breakdown in Hull F.C.'s discipline followed. Rovers were awarded a penalty after F.C. hooker Ron Wileman was found to be offside, and play restarted on the 12th minute at the halfway line following the penalty. Agar passed to captain and stand-off Roger Millward, who proceeded to take a high tackle and a right-arm hit from Wileman that broke his jaw for the third time in six months. Wileman was confronted by referee Lindop but was not sent off for the offence, and Millward continued to play, moving into the defensive line while Agar moved to dummy half; after spending a few minutes in a state of concussion, in a tackle by rival captain Norton, his jaw was knocked back into place from a hit by one of Norton's legs. At the restart, play was stopped again almost immediately when Stone punched Holdstock, conceding another penalty kick being awarded to Rovers. Hubbard kicked from the 20-yard line to further lift Rovers' advantage to 0–7 before 20 minutes had been played.

Hull F.C.'s first point-scoring opportunity came when Lowe conceded a penalty for tackling loose forward Sammy Lloyd late, with Lloyd setting up to kick from the centre line against a heavy, swirling wind. However, the ball skewed left again of the posts. After Rovers conceded further penalties, passes to Tindall, Stone and Birdsall then drove the ball deep into Rovers' defensive line, however their attacking set came to an end when Birdsall was tackled, forcing a scrum halfway between Rovers' posts and the right-hand touchline. F.C. won the scrum, with Pickerill passing to stand-off John Newlove behind the scrum, who then passed to Tim Wilby for him to score F.C.'s first try. Lloyd, after the ball had blown off a divot dug into the pitch four times, failed to convert, leaving the score 3–7 with 30 minutes of the first half played.

Further errors allowed Rovers to claim the ball back at the halfway line as the first half came to its conclusion. As the first half entered injury time, Millward scored a drop-goal at the 25-yard line to bring the score to 3–8. After two minutes of injury time, the half-time hooter sounded.

Sammy Lloyd kicked off the second half with a long kick into Hull Kingston Rovers' half, which was fielded by wing Clive Sullivan. The first tackling set of the half saw Rovers make little ground, with Agar attempting a long kick of his own at the last to put the ball into touch. However, the ball was caught Woods, who ran into the Rovers defence and was only stopped by a tackle from prop Brian Lockwood. During further attacking play from F.C., a quick pass from Pickerill resulted in Newlove knocking on and conceding a scrum. Rovers were penalised for a scrum infringement and Lloyd kicked his second penalty attempt, which swung wide again towards the right-hand side of the posts.

With 46 minutes played, Steve Hartley found open space and broke through F.C.'s defensive line and ran underneath the posts to score a try, however it was disallowed due to the final pass from Roger Millward being ruled a forward pass, the first of five disallowed tries in the match. A few minutes later, F.C. wing Graham Bray ran to the Rovers tryline after another attacking effort, but that try was also disallowed due to obstruction from Lloyd. A few minutes later, another scrum infringement gave Lloyd another penalty attempt from the 20-yard line, which went over the sticks for Lloyd's only successful kick of the match, bringing the score to 5–8 and bringing F.C. back into the match. The 65th minute saw Tindall make a well-timed run to score another try that would have levelled the scores, however his try was also disallowed due to a forward pass from Norton, and a few minutes after that, Wileman then ran in for another try, however he was tackled onto his back on the tryline by Holdstock, Smith and Agar and was unable to ground the ball.

With ten minutes left of the second half, Rovers went on the counterattack and played deep into F.C.'s half, allowing for Steve Hubbard to run in for his second try attempt, however it was disallowed due to insufficient grounding. Substitutes Vince Farrar and Brian Hancock were brought onto the pitch to replace Newlove and Stone, with Lloyd then missing his fifth and final penalty attempt. After the missed kick, Rovers substituted Rose for John Millington. Lloyd conceded a penalty for tackling Millward off the ball, and Hubbard successfully kicked the penalty, settling the score at 5–10.

On the 78th minute, Hubbard turned awkwardly and broke his leg, resulting in him being stretchered off and replaced by Phil Hogan. Hull Kingston Rovers then went on to defend a last-ditch attacking attempt by F.C. from a penalty before the final hooter sounded, securing them their first ever Challenge Cup final victory.

=== Details ===
Saturday, 3 May 1980
3:00 pm BST (UTC+01:00)

Hull F.C.	5–10	Hull Kingston Rovers
Tries: 1 Wilby; Goals: 1 Lloyd 1/5 (1 pen.)	Report	Tries: 1 Hubbard; Goals: 3 Hubbard 3/4 (2 pen.); Drop goals: 1 Millward

Wembley, London
Attendance: 95,000
Referee: Fred Lindop (Wakefield)
Player of the Match: Brian Lockwood

Team details
Hull F.C.		Position	Hull Kingston Rovers
Name	Number	Position	Number	Name
Paul Woods	1	FB	1	David Hall
Graham Bray	2	WG	2	Steve Hubbard (substituted off) 79'
Graham Walters	3	CE	3	Mike Smith
Tim Wilby	4	CE	4	Steve Hartley
Paul Prendiville	5	WG	5	Clive Sullivan
John Newlove (substituted off) 71'	6	SO	6	Roger Millward (c)
Clive Pickerill	7	SH	7	Allan Agar
Keith Tindall	8	PR	8	Roy Holdstock
Ron Wileman	9	HK	9	David Watkinson
Charlie Stone (substituted off) 71'	10	PF	10	Brian Lockwood
Charlie Birdsall	11	SR	11	Paul Rose (substituted off) 72'
Sammy Lloyd	12	SR	12	Phil Lowe
Steve Norton (c)	13	LF	13	Len Casey
Vince Farrar (substituted on) 71'	14	IN	14	Phil Hogan (substituted on) 79'
Brian Hancock (substituted on) 71'	15	IN	15	John Millington (substituted on) 72'
Arthur Bunting		Coach		Roger Millward

== Post-match and legacy ==
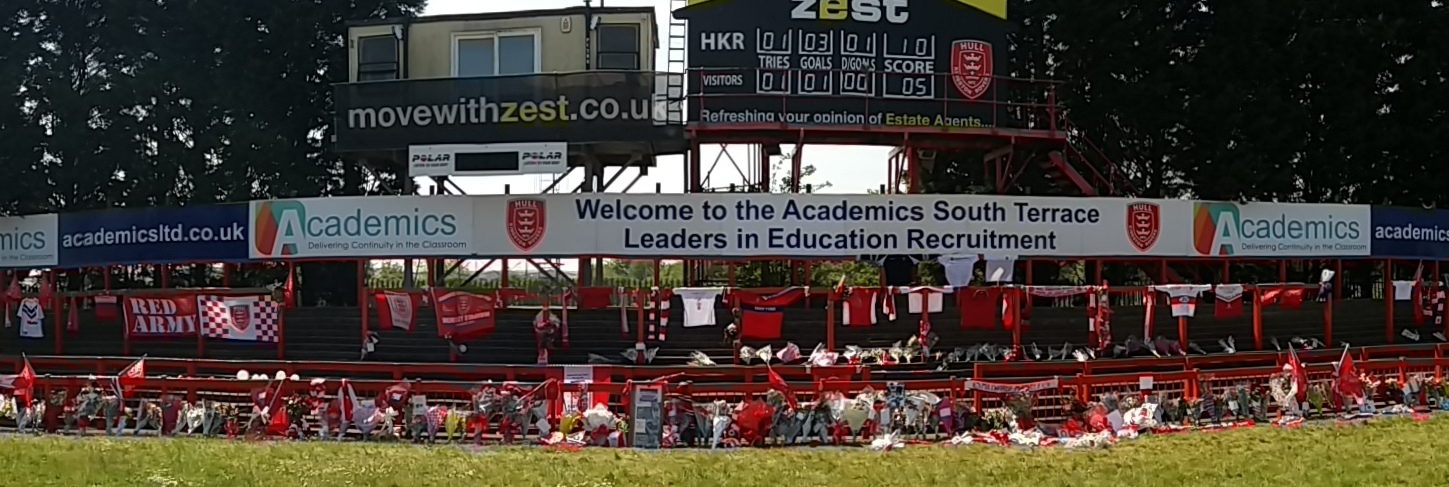
The 1980 Challenge Cup final scoreline replicated at New Craven Park in May 2016 following Roger Millward's death

I looked up at the scoreboard. It read 10–5... the most famous result in Rovers' history.

— Roger Millward, Roger: the autobiography (2005), p.160

After embracing one another in celebration, the victorious Hull Kingston Rovers squad ascended to the royal box and the Challenge Cup trophy was presented by the Queen Mother to player-coach Roger Millward, with Clive Sullivan following behind and Steve Hubbard eventually following with the help of a pair of crutches; Millward, who moved to the club from Castleford in 1966 and who had taken up coaching in 1977 following the sudden death of Harry Poole, said that lifting the trophy "was a moment I'd waited my whole career for and one that I'll remember for the rest of my life". Prop Brian Lockwood was named man of the match and was awarded the Lance Todd Trophy.

A month prior to the final, Kingston upon Hull City Council had organised an open top bus parade through the city for both teams on the day after the final, with a civic reception following at the city's Guildhall on 12 May. After rendezvousing with Hull F.C. at the village of Newport, where both teams changed from coaches to separate open top buses, Hull Kingston Rovers took part in the winners parade on 4 May, initially driving via west Hull to Craven Park before returning along Holderness Road to Hull City Hall, where they were received on the balcony by acting Lord Mayor Alex Clarke and a crowd of over 4,000 fans in a televised event at Queen Victoria Square. Hull F.C., meanwhile, held their own bus parade that returned them to a crowd of supporters welcoming them at The Boulevard.

Following pitch invasions that occurred at the end of both clubs' semi-final fixtures, as well as at Craven Park at the end of that year's Championship derby match held traditionally on Good Friday, there were fears that the final could be a cause for hooliganism, as was common in association football at the time; perimeter fencing had been erected at Wembley three years prior following the 1977 British Home Championship final that resulted in a mass pitch invasion and Wembley's goalposts being torn down. In all, the Metropolitan Police reported only four arrests at the final for public drunkenness, praising both sets of fans praised for their good behaviour. Nearly a year after the final on 17 April 1981, however, a Good Friday derby at The Boulevard during the 1980–81 Championship was marred by fighting in the stands and bricks being thrown, resulting in the derby being stopped for 14 minutes, 40 injuries and up to 13 arrests.

=== Players and coaches ===
With the 1979–80 season now concluded, F.C. stand-off John Newlove and Rovers scrum-half Allan Agar chose to retire from rugby league after the final. Keith Tindall, the only Hull-born player in the F.C. squad, called the final "the biggest disappointment of my life. [...] it'll go to the grave with me".

Rovers player-coach Roger Millward was ruled out of the opening rounds of the subsequent 1980–81 Championship due to the fracture to his jaw sustained during the final. After undergoing surgery to remove three wisdom teeth during July, he returned to playing with Rovers' 'A' team the following October. However after sustaining another broken jaw in a late tackle during a match against Batley's 'A' team, his fourth such injury in ten months, Millward was forced to retire from playing rugby league. F.C.'s coach Arthur Bunting, meanwhile, who had last appeared at Wembley in Hull Kingston Rovers' squad as a scrum-half during their 1964 Challenge Cup final defeat to Widnes, initially planned to step down following the final due to struggles balancing coaching with his business commitments. However, a meeting with the Hull F.C. board on 4 May resulted in him securing a deal for three further years as coach.

Sammy Lloyd, a record-scoring goal kicker at Hull F.C and previous club Castleford, was visibly distressed by his unusually poor kicking performance, stating in tears that he had let his family and F.C.'s fans down, drawing comparisons to Wakefield Trinity's Don Fox missing the match-winning conversion at the 1968 Challenge Cup final, and felt that he could not bear to return to Hull. However, Lloyd was greeted by a rapturous reception from fans upon his return to The Boulevard a day later, convincing him to stay on with the team. Lloyd would later score four goals but ultimately missed one match-winning goal at the 1982 final against Widnes, ending the match 14–14 and sending F.C. to a replay, however as a result of injuries, he was not picked to play in the replay and was replaced by Lee Crooks.

F.C.'s only try-scorer Tim Wilby later became the chairman of both Hull F.C. and the city's association football club Hull City A.F.C. in March 1997. Under his tenure, Hull F.C. were renamed 'Hull Sharks', with plans explored to merge both F.C. and Rovers, the latter of which had fell into administration, into one Humberside team, to groundshare with Hull City for the latter to cut operating costs, and in association with Hull City's owner, leisure centre proprietor David Lloyd, to play Hull's sports teams in one central 'super stadium'. Amid controversy over "interference" with F.C., who were pushing for promotion to the newly created Super League, Wilby resigned in September 1997 citing "exhaustion" and moved to Australia, handing control of Hull F.C. and Hull City to David Lloyd.

=== Subsequent finals ===
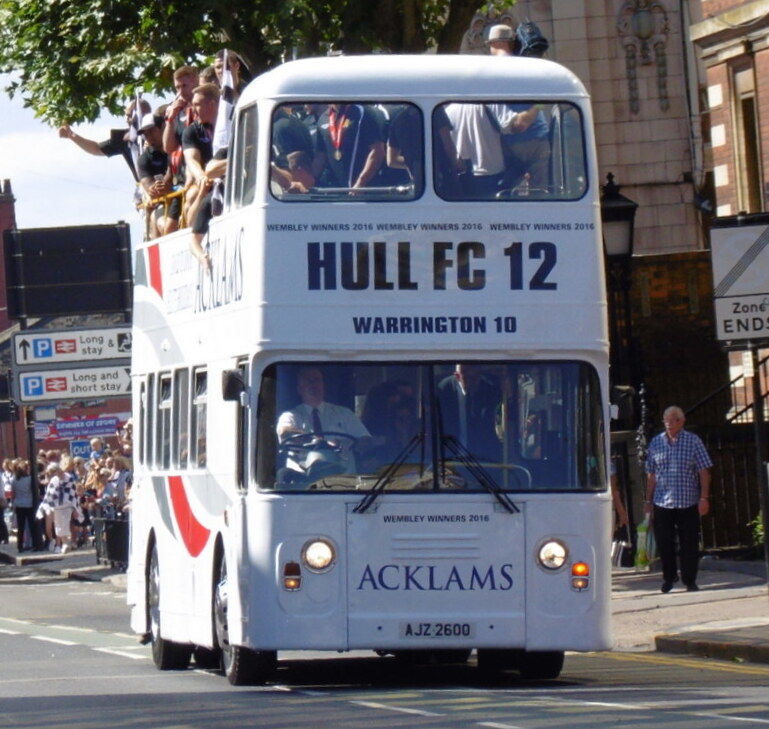
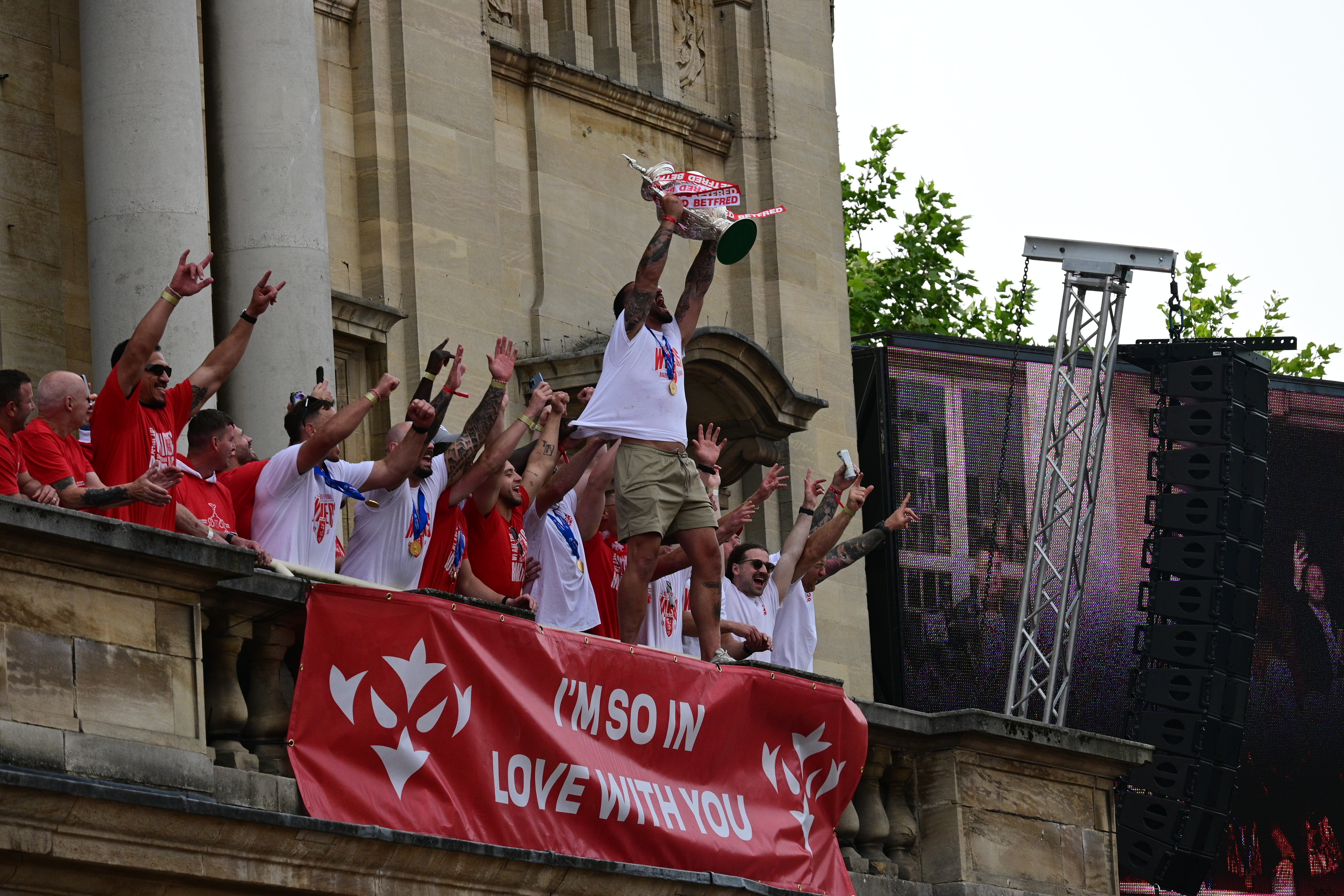
The Challenge Cup returned to Hull a further five times, with Hull Kingston Rovers claiming the latest title in 2025

Hull Kingston Rovers returned to the Challenge Cup final a year later in 1981, losing 18–6 against Widnes. The club continued as runners-up in the 1986 final against Castleford, the 2015 final against the Leeds Rhinos, and the 2023 final against the Leigh Leopards, and would not win another Challenge Cup final for 45 years until 2025, winning 8–6 against the Warrington Wolves, the club's first major trophy since 1985, as part of a treble-winning season. As defending champions, Hull Kingston Rovers made a first back-to-back appearance at Wembley since 1981 for the 2026 final, however they were heavily defeated by the Wigan Warriors 40–10.

Hull F.C. returned to the Challenge Cup final in 1982 and, after initially playing to a 14–14 draw, won the final replay at Elland Road, the first held since 1954, 18–9 against Widnes. After appearing as runners-up at the closely-contended 1985 final against Wigan, Hull F.C. won the 2005 final at the Millennium Stadium in Cardiff, were runners-up at the 2008 final against St Helens and the 2013 final against the Wigan Warriors at the new Wembley Stadium, and won back-to-back finals in 2016 and 2017 against the Warrington Wolves and Wigan Warriors respectively.

Both teams did not face each other in the Challenge Cup for 45 years until 2025, when Hull F.C. were drawn to play Hull Kingston Rovers away in the quarter-final round at their home MKM Stadium venue on 5 April. The match, which saw Hull F.C. defeated 16–32 by Rovers, drew a crowd of 20,226, the highest-attended non-final Challenge Cup fixture since 1989.
