= 1979–80 BBC2 Floodlit Trophy =

- Structure: Floodlit knockout championship
- Teams: 22
- Winners: Hull F.C.
- Runners-up: Hull Kingston Rovers

The 1979–80 BBC2 Floodlit Trophy was the fifteenth occasion on which the BBC2 Floodlit Trophy competition had been held.
This year, for the last time, a new name appeared on the trophy when Hull F.C. won the trophy by beating Hull Kingston Rovers by the score of 13-3
The match was played at Boulevard, in Hull, East Riding of Yorkshire. The attendance was 18,500, and the receipts were £16,605
The attendance was a record for a BBC2 Floodlit Trophy, never to be beaten

== Background ==
This season saw no changes in the entrants, no new members and no withdrawals, the number remaining at twenty-two.
The format remained as a knock-out competition from the preliminary round through to the final.
The preliminary round involved twelve clubs, to reduce the numbers taking part in the competition proper to just sixteen.

== Competition and results ==
=== Preliminary round ===
Involved six matches and 12 clubs

Game No	Fixture date	Home team	Score	Away team	Venue	Att	Notes	Ref
P	Tue 4 Sep 1979	Bramley	5–21	Hunslet	McLaren Field			
P	Tue 4 Sep 1979	Hull F.C.	8–1	Halifax	Boulevard		1	
P	Wed 5 Sep 1979	Castleford	22–12	Wakefield Trinity	Wheldon Road			
P	Tue 11 Sep 1979	Whitehaven	5–29	Barrow	Recreation Ground			
P	Wed 19 Sep 1979	Oldham	9–20	St Helens	Watersheddings	1,355		
P	Wed 26 Sep 1979	Warrington	4–12	Leigh	Wilderspool			

=== First round ===
Involved eight matches and 16 clubs

Game No	Fixture date	Home team	Score	Away team	Venue	Att	Notes	Ref
1	Tue 25 Sep 1979	Keighley	9–2	Dewsbury	Lawkholme Lane			
2	Sun 30 Sep 1979	Hull F.C.	34–2	Huddersfield	Boulevard		2	
3	Tue 2 Oct 1979	Widnes	27–13	Swinton	Naughton Park		3	
4	Tue 9 Oct 1979	St Helens	45–17	Rochdale Hornets	Knowsley Road	3,000	3 4	
5	Tue 9 Oct 1979	Salford	24–6	Wigan	The Willows			
6	Tue 16 Oct 1979	Hull Kingston Rovers	25–12	Castleford	Craven Park		3	
7	Tue 23 Oct 1979	Hunslet	10–12	Leeds	Mount Pleasant		3	
8	Tue 30 Oct 1979	Leigh	20–4	Barrow	Hilton Park		3	

=== Second round ===
Involved four matches with eight clubs

Game No	Fixture date	Home team	Score	Away team	Venue	Att	Notes	Ref
1	Tue 6 Nov 1979	Hull Kingston Rovers	41–15	Keighley	Craven Park		3	
2	Tue 13 Nov 1979	Leigh	14–5	Widnes	Hilton Park		3	
3	Tue 27 Nov 1979	Hull F.C.	16–9	Leeds	Boulevard		3	
4	Tue 20 Nov 1979	St Helens	P–P	Salford	Knowsley Road			
R	Fri 30 Nov 1979	St Helens	15–10	Salford	Knowsley Road	4,500		

=== Semi-finals ===
Involved two matches and four clubs

Game No	Fixture date	Home team	Score	Away team	Venue	Att	Notes	Ref
1	Tue 4 Dec 1979	Hull F.C.	9–6	Leigh	Boulevard		3	
2	Tue 11 Dec 1979	Hull Kingston Rovers	10–7	St Helens	Knowsley Road	7,766	3	

=== Final ===
The attendance was a record for a BBC2 Floodlit Trophy final, never to be beaten.

18 December 1979

Hull	13 – 3	Hull Kingston Rovers
Tries: Evans, Dennison, Birdsall; Goals: Dennison (2)		Tries: Hubbard

The Boulevard, Hull
Attendance: 18,500
Referee: Billy Thompson (Huddersfield)

==== Teams ====
Hull F.C.	No.	Hull Kingston Rovers
	Teams	
Paul Woods	1	Ian Robinson
Graham Bray	2	Steve Hubbard
Graham Evans	3	Mike Smith
Phil Coupland	4	Bernard Watson
Steve Dennison	5	Clive Sullivan (c)
John Newlove	6	Dave Hall
Keith Hepworth	7	Allan Agar
Keith Tindall	8	Roy Holdstock
Ron Wileman	9	Graham Tyreman
Vince Farrar (c)	10	Brian Lockwood
Charlie Stone	11	Phil Lowe
Keith Boxall	12	Geoff Clarkson
Steve Norton	13	Phil Hogan
	Subs	
Graham Walters	14	Steve Hartley
Charlie Birdsall	15	John Millington
Arthur Bunting	Coach	Roger Millward

=== The road to success ===
This tree excludes any preliminary round fixtures

First round
Hull FC	34
Huddersfield	2
Hunslet	10
Leeds	12
Leigh	20
Barrow	4
Widnes	27
Swinton	13
Hull Kingston Rovers	25
Castleford	12
Keighley	9
Dewsbury	2
St. Helens	45
Rochdale Hornets	17
Salford	24
Wigan	6

Second round
Hull FC	16
Leeds	9
Leigh	14
Widnes	5
Hull Kingston Rovers	41
Keighley	15
St. Helens	15
Salford	10

Semi-finals
Hull FC	9
Leigh	6
Hull Kingston Rovers	10
St. Helens	7

Final
Hull FC	13
Hull Kingston Rovers	3

== Notes and comments ==
1 * the first BBC2 Floodlit Trophy match to end with a team scoring 1 point
2 * Played in daylight
3 * This match was televised
4 * At the time this was the third highest score

== Postscript ==
To date, this was the last season for the BBC2 Floodlit Trophy Competition, which had taken place annually only since its inauguration in the 1965-66 season.
Despite several minor disagreements between the BBC and the RFL, including over shirt sponsorship in the early 1970s, overall the competition had been a great success.
However financial cutbacks at the BBC lead to its cancellation after the 1979–80 competition.
Therefore, this season was to be the last.

== See also ==
- 1979–80 Northern Rugby Football League season
- BBC2 Floodlit Trophy
