= Hull derby =

Rugby league rivalry between Hull F.C. and Hull Kingston Rovers

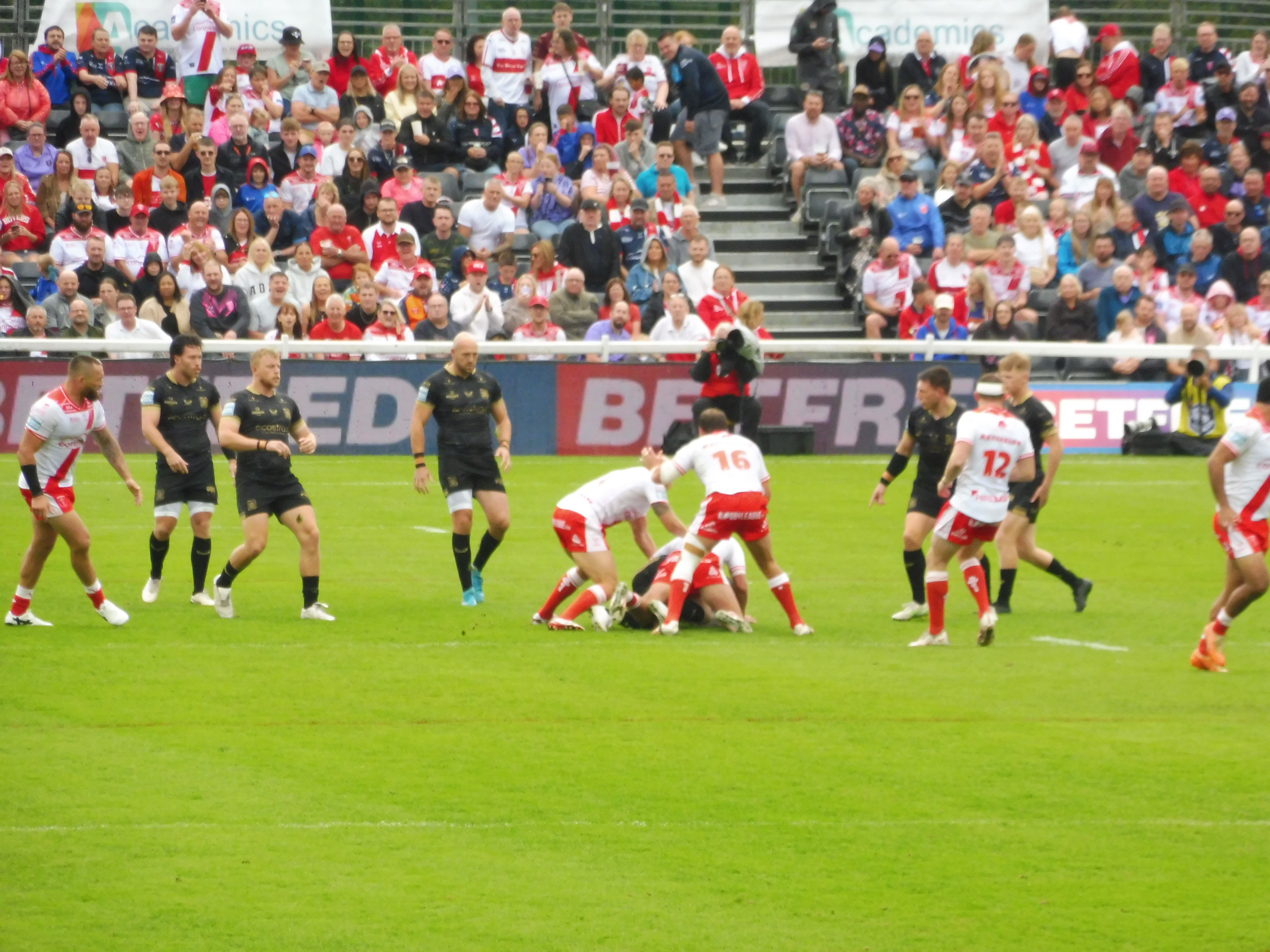
- The Hull derby underway at Craven Park in September 2025
- Location: Kingston upon Hull
- Teams: Hull F.C.; Hull KR
- First meeting: 22 March 1902
- Latest meeting: Hull FC 20–34 Hull KR (23 July 2026)
- Next meeting: TBC
- Stadiums: MKM Stadium; Craven Park

Statistics
- Total meetings: 252
- Most wins: Hull F.C. (124)
- Largest victory: Hull F.C. 56–12 Hull KR (19 April 2019)
- Locations of the two Hull teams within the East Riding of Yorkshire

The Hull derby refers to the rugby league rivalry between Hull F.C. and Hull Kingston Rovers. Both rugby teams are based in the city of Kingston upon Hull, East Riding of Yorkshire, England. The rivalry is the only British rugby league rivalry where the two clubs are from the same city. It is compared to the St Helens R.F.C.–Wigan Warriors rivalry as one of the highest profile rugby league rivalries in the United Kingdom.

== History ==
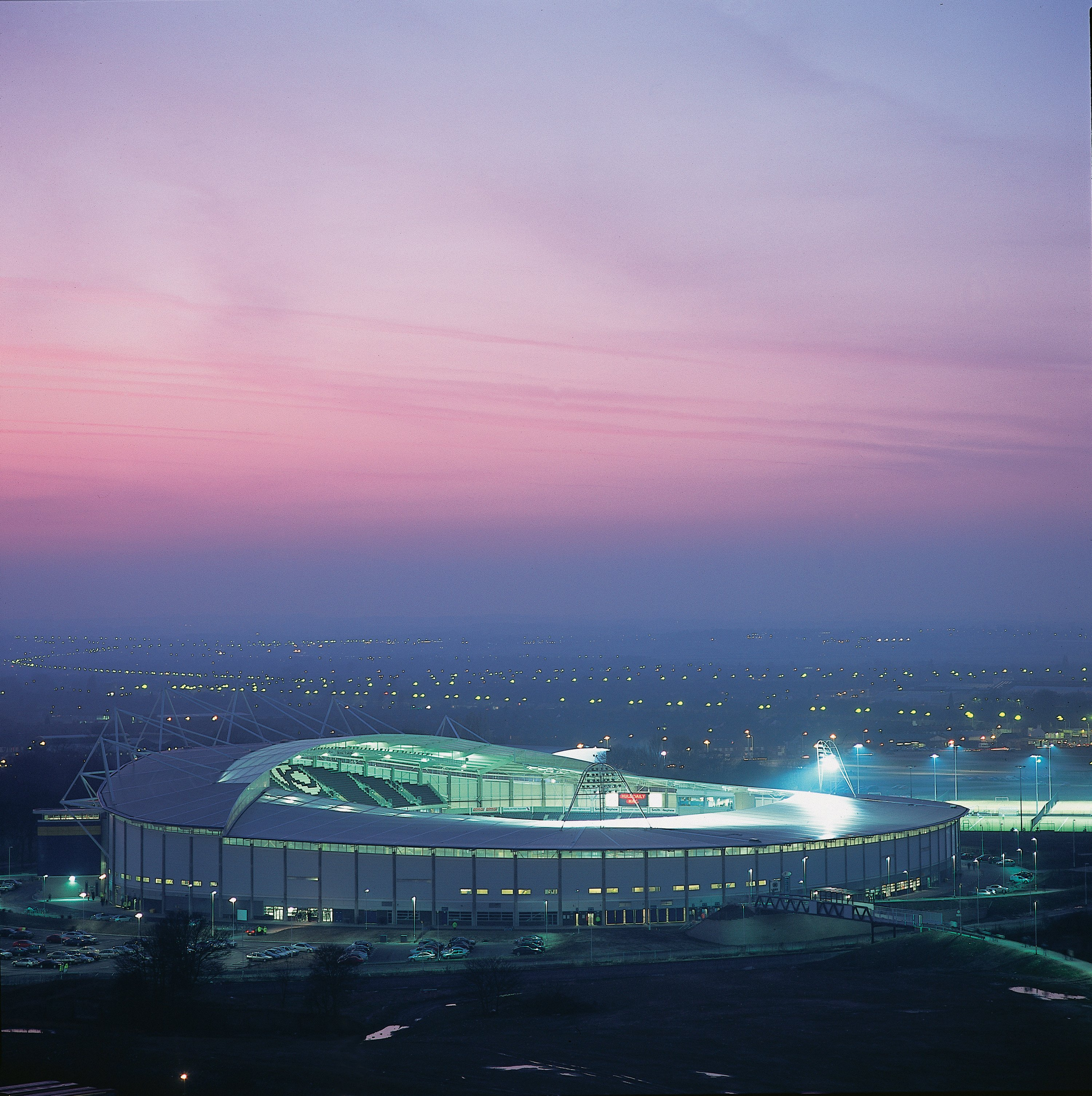
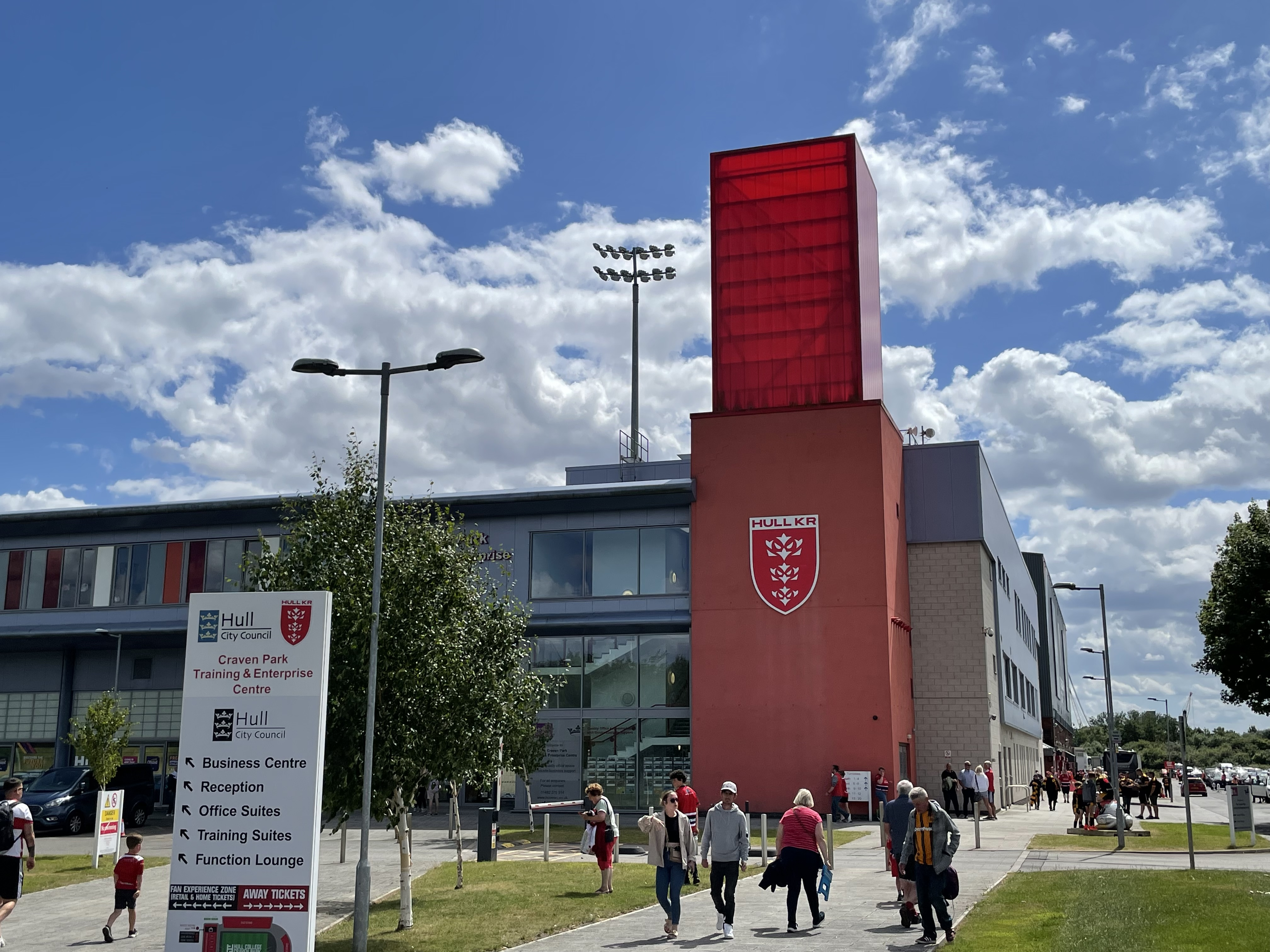
The MKM Stadium (left) and Craven Park (right) are the homes of Hull F.C. and Hull KR.

Hull F.C. and Hull KR were founded in 1865 and 1882 respectively. Hull F.C. were founding members of the Northern Rugby Football Union and breakaway code of rugby league in 1895. Hull KR initially remained playing rugby union but opted to join rugby league two years later after controversy over alleged professionalism (which was banned in rugby union) in their Yorkshire Cup win in 1897. Though the Yorkshire Rugby Football Union found them not guilty after an inquiry, the Rugby Football Union overturned the YRFU's decision and suspended Hull KR.

The two clubs were at the centre of a dispute in 1896 over use of the Athletics Ground (later renamed The Boulevard). Hull KR originally had tenancy however Hull F.C. took it over, forcing Hull KR out, after arguing they should have primacy as the older club and because they paid triple the £50 (£4,500 in 2019) a year rent that Hull KR were paying. Hull F.C. purchased the ground outright in 1899 for £6,500 (£563,700 in 2019). Hull KR moved to the east of the city and founded their own ground of Craven Street. Hull KR took their place as a fully-fledged Northern Union club in 1899/1900 and, on 16 September 1899, they played the first competitive first team derby against Hull FC, winning 8–2 in front of a crowd of 14,000 at Craven Street. Finishing sixth out of 16 clubs in the YSC, above their neighbours, was a remarkable achievement in their first season in the NU.

The rivalry between the two sides sees a geographic split with the two teams separated by the River Hull; people living west of the river tend to support F.C. while residents east of the river are mostly Hull KR fans. In 1981, the derby match on Good Friday was marred by hooliganism and brick throwing between the rival fans at The Boulevard. Hull F.C. were fined £1,000 and threatened with closure of their home ground unless it passed an inspection.

The two sides competed in the 1980 Challenge Cup final at Wembley, which saw a Hull KR victory with a scoreline of 10–5 to mark their first Challenge Cup. Hull FC had won the cup once prior to then but never at Wembley, which became a source of ridicule for Rovers fans. The Black and Whites have since won the cup 4 times including twice at Wembley, most recently in 2017.

Ahead of the formation of the Super League in 1996, a merger proposal was rejected along with several others which would have seen both teams merge to form one club called Humberside. The merger proposal was intended to form higher-quality teams ahead of the new competition. Hull F.C. were first promoted to the Super League in its third season in 1998, whilst Hull KR gained their first season in the competition in 2007, with the two clubs then playing their first derby in 13 years. Hull F.C. have never been relegated from the Super League since their initial promotion, whereas Hull KR spent one season in the Championship in 2017.

The 2025 Challenge Cup quarter final derby was the first cup derby in 39 years, attracting an attendance of 20,226 to the MKM Stadium, the largest Challenge Cup quarter final attendance since a fixture between Leeds and Widnes in the 1989 Challenge Cup attracted over 29,000 fans to the Headingley Rugby Stadium. Hull KR won the fixture with a scoreline of 32–16, knocking Hull F.C. out of the cup and ensuring their place in the semi finals. They would go on to win the final against the Warrington Wolves, their first major trophy in 40 years.

== Head to Head ==
Statistics correct as of 23 July 2026

In all competitions, competitive and uncompetitive:

Played	Hull F.C.	Drawn	Hull KR
252	124	10	118

=== Meetings in major finals ===
- 1920–21 Yorkshire Cup Final: Hull KR 2–0 Hull F.C.
- 1920–21 NFRL Division One Championship Final: Hull F.C. 16–14 Hull KR
- 1967-68 Yorkshire Cup Final: Hull KR 8–7 Hull F.C.
- 1979-80 BBC2 Floodlit Trophy Final: Hull F.C. 13–3 Hull KR
- 1979–80 Challenge Cup Final: Hull KR 10–5 Hull F.C.
- 1980–81 Premiership Final: Hull KR 11–7 Hull F.C.
- 1981–82 League Cup Final: Hull F.C. 12–4 Hull KR
- 1984–85 Yorkshire Cup Final: Hull F.C. 29–12 Hull KR
- 1984–85 League Cup Final: Hull KR 12–0 Hull F.C.

Played – 9 Hull KR wins – 5 Hull FC wins – 4 Hull KR points – 76 Hull FC points – 89

== Collective honours ==
Hull F.C.		Honour	Hull KR	
Rank	No.	Honour	No.	Rank
5th	6	League	6	5th
7th	5	Challenge Cup	2	17th
22nd	0	Grand Final	1	5th
6th	1	Premiership	2	4th
6th	1	League Cup	1	6th
—N/a	0	Charity Shield	0	—N/a
—N/a	0	World Club Challenge	1	—N/a
5th	4	Yorkshire League	2	8th
6th	5	Yorkshire Cup	7	5th
5th	1	BBC2 Floodlit Trophy	1	5th

== See also ==
- Derbies in the Rugby Football League
