= Allan Agar =

English RL coach and former rugby league footballer

Personal information
- Born: 11 June 1949 (age 77) Pontefract, England

Playing information
- Position: Stand-off, Scrum-half
Club
Years	Team	Pld	T	G	FG	P
1967–70	Featherstone Rovers	4	0	0	0	0
1970–75	Dewsbury	153	34	39	1	181
1975–77	New Hunslet	56	23	13	11	106
1977–80	Hull Kingston Rovers	113	32	16	17	145
1980–81	Wakefield Trinity	31	4	3	8	26
1981–82	Carlisle	33	12	1	1	39
1982–83	Featherstone Rovers	0	0	0	0	0
	Total	390	105	72	38	497

Coaching information
Club
Years	Team	Gms	W	D	L	W%
1981–82	Carlisle RLFC	35	28	0	7	80
1983–85	Featherstone Rovers	104	45	6	53	43
1986	Bramley	3	0	0	3	0
1989–91	Rochdale Hornets	16	4	0	12	25
1991–92	Featherstone Rovers	27	12	1	14	44
	Total	185	89	7	89	48
- Relatives: Richard Agar (son)

Allan Agar (born 11 June 1949) is an English former professional rugby league footballer who played in the 1970s and 1980s, and coached in the 1980s and 1990s. He played at club level for Featherstone Rovers (two spells), Dewsbury, New Hunslet, Hull Kingston Rovers, Wakefield Trinity (captain), and Carlisle, as a stand-off or scrum-half, and coached at club level for Featherstone Rovers (two spells), Bramley and Rochdale Hornets.

== Background ==
Allan Agar was born in Pontefract, West Riding of Yorkshire, England, he was a pupil at Normanton Grammar School alongside fellow rugby league footballers; Mick Morgan and Stuart Carlton, and he is the father of the rugby league footballer, and coach; Richard Agar.

== Playing career ==
=== Dewsbury ===
He played stand-off in Dewsbury's 9–36 defeat by Leeds in the 1972–73 Yorkshire Cup Final during the 1972–73 season at Odsal Stadium, Bradford on Saturday 7 October 1972, in front of a crowd of 7,806.

He played scrum-half in Dewsbury's 22–13 victory over Leeds in the Championship Final during the 1972–73 season at Odsal Stadium, Bradford on Saturday 19 May 1973.

=== Hull Kingston Rovers ===
He was an unused substitute in Hull Kingston Rovers' 26–11 victory over St. Helens in the 1977 BBC2 Floodlit Trophy Final during the 1977–78 season at Craven Park, Hull on Tuesday 13 December 1977.

He played in Hull Kingston Rovers' Championship winning squad during the 1978–79 season

He played scrum-half in the 13–3 defeat by Hull F.C. in the 1979 BBC2 Floodlit Trophy Final during the 1979–80 season at The Boulevard, Hull on Tuesday 18 December 1979, in front of a crowd of 18,500

Allan Agar played scrum-half in the 10–5 victory over Hull F.C. in 1979–80 Challenge Cup Final during the 1979–80 season at Wembley Stadium, London on Saturday 3 May 1980, in front of a crowd of 95,000. In August 1980, he was sold to Wakefield Trinity for a fee of £4,000.

== Coaching career ==
Agar became coach of Featherstone Rovers, and in his first season took them to a 14–12 victory over Hull F.C. in the 1982–83 Challenge Cup Final. He then went on to win the Man of Steel in 1983. He later coached Rochdale Hornets from July 1989 until January 1991, and was the coach in Rochdale Hornets' 14–24 defeat by St. Helens in the 1991–92 Lancashire Cup Final during the 1991–92 season at Wilderspool Stadium, Warrington on Sunday 20 October 1991, in front of a crowd of 9,269. Agar was later appointed Chief executive officer of the Featherstone Rovers.

== Honours ==
Club

- Challenge Cup Winner 1979/80, 1982/83
- Championship Winner 1972/73, 1978/79
- BBC2 Floodlit Trophy Winner 1977/78

Individual

- Man of Steel Award: 1983
