= Vince Farrar =

GB & England international rugby league player & coach (1947–2017)

Personal information
- Full name: Vincent Farrar
- Born: 25 February 1947 Pontefract, England
- Died: 13 July 2017 (aged 70) Pontefract, England

Playing information
- Position: Prop, Hooker, Loose forward
Club
Years	Team	Pld	T	G	FG	P
1965–77	Featherstone Rovers	309	61	0	0	183
1974	Cronulla-Sutherland	18	1	0	0	3
1977–81	Hull FC
1984–85	Sheffield Eagles	22	2	0	0	8
	Total	349	64	0	0	194
Representative
Years	Team	Pld	T	G	FG	P
1971–78	Yorkshire	10	1	0	0	3
1977	England	1	0	0	0	0
1978	Great Britain	1	0	0	0	0

Coaching information
Club
Years	Team	Gms	W	D	L	W%
1980–82	Featherstone Rovers	65	23	40	2	35

Vincent Farrar (25 February 1947 – 13 July 2017) was an English professional rugby league footballer who played in the 1960s, 1970s and 1980s, and coached in the 1980s. He played at representative level for Great Britain, England and Yorkshire, and at club level for Featherstone Rovers (captain), Cronulla-Sutherland Sharks, Hull FC and the Sheffield Eagles (captain), as a prop, hooker or loose forward, was captain of Hull during the 1978–79 season and 1979–80 season, and coached at club level for Featherstone Rovers.

== Background ==
Vince Farrar's birth was registered in Pontefract, West Riding of Yorkshire, England, and he died aged 70 in Pontefract, West Yorkshire, England.

== Playing career ==
=== Championship appearances ===
Vince Farrar was captain in Featherstone Rovers' Championship victory during the 1976–77 season.

=== Challenge Cup Final appearances ===
Vince Farrar played at prop and scored a try in Featherstone Rovers' 33–14 victory over Bradford Northern in the 1973 Challenge Cup Final during the 1972–73 season at Wembley Stadium, London on Saturday 12 May 1973, in front of a crowd of 72,395, and was a substitute in Hull FC's 5–10 defeat by Hull Kingston Rovers in the 1980 Challenge Cup Final during the 1979–80 season at Wembley Stadium, London on Saturday 3 May 1980, in front of a crowd of 95,000.

=== County Cup Final appearances ===
Vince Farrar played hooker in Featherstone Rovers' 9–12 defeat by Hull F.C. in the 1969 Yorkshire Cup Final during the 1969–70 season at Headingley, Leeds on Saturday 20 September 1969, played loose forward in the 7–23 defeat by Leeds in the 1970 Yorkshire Cup Final during the 1970–71 season at Odsal Stadium, Bradford on Saturday 21 November 1970, played at prop in the 12–16 defeat by Leeds in the 1976 Yorkshire Cup Final during the 1976–77 season at Headingley, Leeds on Saturday 16 October 1976, and played at prop in the 7–17 defeat by Castleford in the 1977 Yorkshire Cup Final during the 1977–78 season at Headingley, Leeds on Saturday 15 October 1977.

=== BBC2 Floodlit Trophy Final appearances ===
Vince Farrar played at prop in Hull FC's 13–3 victory over Hull Kingston Rovers in the 1979 BBC2 Floodlit Trophy Final during the 1979-80 season at the Boulevard, Hull on Tuesday 18 December 1979.

=== Club career ===
Vince Farrar made his début for Featherstone Rovers on Saturday 21 August 1965, in the summer of 1977 he was the subject of a transfer bid from Bradford Northern, in 1977 he was transferred to Hull F.C. for a fee £10,000 (based on increases in average earnings, this would be approximately £90,560 in 2016).

=== Testimonial match ===
Vince Farrar's benefit season/testimonial match at Featherstone Rovers took place during the 1975–76 season, including the match against Wakefield Trinity at Post Office Road, Featherstone on Good Friday 16 April 1976.

=== Representative honours ===
Vince Farrar won a cap for England while at Featherstone Rovers in 1977 against France, and won a cap for Great Britain while at Hull in 1978 against Australia.

Vince Farrar won caps for Yorkshire while at Featherstone Rovers; during the 1971–72 season as an interchange/substitute against Lancashire and Cumberland, during the 1974–75 season against Cumbria and Other Nationalities, during the 1975–76 season against Lancashire, during the 1976–77 season against Lancashire, and during the 1974–75 season against Cumbria, and Lancashire.

== Honoured at Featherstone Rovers ==
Farrar is a Featherstone Rovers Hall of Fame inductee.
