= Dave Hall (rugby league) =

GB international rugby league footballer

Personal information
- Full name: David Hall
- Born: 14 January 1954 (age 72) Hull, England

Playing information
- Position: Fullback, Centre, Stand-off, Loose forward
Club
Years	Team	Pld	T	G	FG	P
1970–85	Hull Kingston Rovers	328	73	164	2	549
1986	Wakefield Trinity	3	0	0	0	0
	Total	331	73	164	2	549
Representative
Years	Team	Pld	T	G	FG	P
1984	Great Britain	2	0	0	0	0

David Hall (born 14 January 1954) is a former professional rugby league footballer who played in the 1970s and 1980s. He played at representative level for Great Britain, and at club level for Hull Kingston Rovers and Wakefield Trinity, as a goal-kicking fullback, centre, stand-off or loose forward.

== Playing career ==
=== International honours ===
Hall won caps for Great Britain while at Hull Kingston Rovers in 1984 against France (2 matches).

=== Challenge Cup Final appearances ===
Hall played fullback in Hull Kingston Rovers' 10-5 victory over Hull F.C. in the 1979–80 Challenge Cup Final during the 1979–80 season at Wembley Stadium, London on Saturday 3 May 1980, in front of a crowd of 95,000, and played fullback in the 9-18 defeat by Widnes in the 1980–81 Challenge Cup Final during the 1980–81 season at Wembley Stadium, London on Saturday 2 May 1981, in front of a crowd of 92,496.

=== County Cup Final appearances ===
Hall played stand-off in Hull Kingston Rovers' 7-8 defeat by Leeds in the 1980–81 Yorkshire Cup Final during the 1979–80 season at Fartown Ground, Huddersfield on Saturday 8 November 1980, and played loose forward (replaced by substitute Steve Hartley) in the 12-29 defeat by Hull F.C. in the 1984–85 Yorkshire Cup Final during the 1984–85 season at Boothferry Park, Kingston upon Hull on Saturday 27 October 1984.

=== BBC2 Floodlit Trophy Final appearances ===
Hall played fullback, and scored 4-goals in Hull Kingston Rovers' 26-11 victory over St. Helens in the 1977 BBC2 Floodlit Trophy Final during the 1977-78 season at Craven Park, Hull on Tuesday 13 December 1977, and played stand-off in the 3-13 defeat by Hull F.C. in the 1979 BBC2 Floodlit Trophy Final during the 1979–80 season at The Boulevard, Hull on Tuesday 18 December 1979. The record for the most goals in a BBC2 Floodlit Trophy Final is 4-goals, and is jointly held by; Ron Willett, Kel Coslett, and Dave Hall.

=== John Player Trophy Final appearances ===
Hall played loose forward in Hull Kingston Rovers' 4-12 defeat by Hull F.C. in the 1981–82 John Player Trophy Final during the 1981–82 season at Headingley, Leeds on Saturday 23 January 1982.

=== Testimonial match ===
Hall's Testimonial match at Hull Kingston Rovers took place in 1981.

=== Hull KR Heritage Number ===
Hall made his Hull KR debut at Odsal Stadium, Bradford om 4th April 1971. His 'Heritage Number' is 744.

== Genealogical information ==
Hall is the father of the rugby league footballer; Craig Hall.
