= Paul Woods (rugby) =

Wales international rugby league footballer & coach

Personal information
- Full name: Paul Woods
- Born: 28 October 1950 Pontllanfraith, Wales
- Died: 1 November 2007 (aged 57) Abergavenny, Wales

Playing information

Rugby union
Club
Years	Team	Pld	T	G	FG	P
	Oakdale RFC
	Tredegar RFC
≤1976–76	Pontypool RFC
	Total	0	0	0	0	0

Rugby league
- Position: Fullback, Stand-off, Scrum-half
Club
Years	Team	Pld	T	G	FG	P
≥1974–≤79	Widnes	77	13	147
≤1979–79	Rochdale Hornets
1979–81	Hull FC	29	1	21	3	48
1981–83	Cardiff City (Bridgend) Blue Dragons	85	15	2	2	58
1984–86	Runcorn Highfield	36	4	15	3	49
	Total	227	33	185	8	155
Representative
Years	Team	Pld	T	G	FG	P
1977–81	Wales	10	0	13	0	26

Coaching information
Club
Years	Team	Gms	W	D	L	W%
	Tredegar RFC
	Markham RFC
	Total	0	0	0	0

Paul Woods (28 October 1950 – 1 November 2007) was a Welsh rugby union and professional rugby league footballer who played in the 1970s and 1980s, and rugby union coach. He played club level rugby union (RU) for Oakdale RFC, Tredegar RFC and Pontypool RFC, and representative rugby league (RL) for Wales, and at club level for Widnes, Rochdale Hornets, Hull FC, Cardiff City (Bridgend) Blue Dragons and Runcorn Highfield, as a fullback, stand-off or scrum-half, and coached club level rugby union (RU) for Tredegar RFC and Margam RFC.

== Background ==
Paul Woods was born in Pontllanfraith, Wales, and he died aged 57 of leukaemia in Abergavenny, Wales.

== Playing career ==
=== International honours ===
Paul Woods won 10 caps for Wales (RL) in 1977–1981 while at Widnes, Rochdale Hornets, and Hull 13-goals 26-points.

=== Challenge Cup Final appearances ===
Paul Woods played fullback in Hull FC's 5–10 defeat by Hull Kingston Rovers in the 1980 Challenge Cup Final during the 1979–80 season at Wembley Stadium, London on Saturday 3 May 1980, in front of a crowd of 95,000.

=== BBC2 Floodlit Trophy Final appearances ===
Paul Woods played fullback in Hull FC's 13–3 victory over Hull Kingston Rovers in the 1979 BBC2 Floodlit Trophy Final during the 1979-80 season at The Boulevard, Kingston upon Hull on Tuesday 18 December 1979.

=== Player's No.6 Trophy Final appearances ===
Paul Woods played on the wing and scored 2-drop goals in Widnes' 4–9 defeat by Warrington in the 1977–78 Players No.6 Trophy Final during the 1977–78 season at Knowsley Road, St. Helens on Saturday 28 January 1978
