= Graham Bray =

English rugby league footballer (born 1953)

Personal information
- Full name: Graham Bray
- Born: 10 April 1953 (age 73) Doncaster, West Riding of Yorkshire, England

Playing information
- Position: Wing
Club
Years	Team	Pld	T	G	FG	P
1972–77	Featherstone Rovers	65+4	18	0	0	54
1977–81	Hull F.C.	143	55	0	0	165
	Total	212	73	0	0	219

Graham Bray (born 10 April 1953) is an English former professional rugby league footballer who played in the 1970s and 1980s. He played at club level for Featherstone Rovers, and Hull F.C., as a wing.

== Playing career ==
Graham Bray was born in Doncaster, West Riding of Yorkshire, England.

== Playing career ==
Bray made his début for Featherstone Rovers on Saturday 1 January 1972, he had played 16-matches for Featherstone Rovers who went on to be League Leaders in the Championship during the 1976–77 season, when in January 1977, midway through the season, he transferred to Hull F.C. who went on to be League Leaders in the Second Division, he is therefore one of only a few (only?) players to have won both a Championship, and Second Division winners medal in the same season, he scored 21-tries for Hull FC in the 1978–79 season, that season being the second-highest try-scorer for Hull F.C. (behind Paul Prendiville with 25-tries), and the ninth-highest try-scorer in the league, he played his last match for Hull FC during the 1980–81 season.

=== Challenge Cup Final appearances ===
Bray played on the wing in Featherstone Rovers' 9-24 defeat by Warrington in the 1974 Challenge Cup Final during the 1973–74 season at Wembley Stadium, London on Saturday 11 May 1974, in front of a crowd of 77,400, and played on the wing in Hull FC's 5-10 defeat by Hull Kingston Rovers in the 1980 Challenge Cup Final during the 1979–80 season at Wembley Stadium, London on Saturday 3 May 1980, in front of a crowd of 95,000.

=== County Cup Final appearances ===
Bray played on the wing, and scored a try in Featherstone Rovers' 12-16 defeat by Leeds in the 1976 Yorkshire Cup Final during the 1976–77 season at Headingley, Leeds on Saturday 16 October 1976.

=== BBC2 Floodlit Trophy Final appearances ===
Bray played on the wing in Hull FC's 13-3 victory over Hull Kingston Rovers in the 1979 BBC2 Floodlit Trophy Final during the 1979-80 season at The Boulevard, Kingston upon Hull on Tuesday 18 December 1979.
