= John Millington (rugby league) =

England international rugby league footballer

Personal information
- Full name: John Millington
- Born: 8 February 1949 (age 77) Hull district, England

Playing information
- Position: Prop
Club
Years	Team	Pld	T	G	FG	P
1970–85	Hull Kingston Rovers	416	32	0	0	97
1983	Kent Invicta	6	0	0	0	0
1985–86	Wakefield Trinity	15	0	0	0	0
	Total	437	32	0	0	97
Representative
Years	Team	Pld	T	G	FG	P
1975–81	England	2	0	0	0	0

John Millington (born 8 February 1949) is an English former professional rugby league footballer who played in the 1970s and 1980s. He played at representative level for England, and at club level for Hull Kingston Rovers and Wakefield Trinity, as a prop.

== Background ==
John Millington's birth was registered in Hull district, East Riding of Yorkshire, England.

== Playing career ==
=== Club career ===
Millington played at prop in Hull Kingston Rovers' 11–7 victory over Castleford in the 1971–72 Yorkshire Cup Final during the 1971–72 season at Belle Vue, Wakefield on Saturday 21 August 1971, played at prop in the 16–13 victory over Wakefield Trinity in the 1974–75 Yorkshire Cup Final during the 1974–75 season at Headingley, Leeds on Saturday 26 October 1974, and played at prop in the 11–15 defeat by Leeds in the 1975–76 Yorkshire Cup Final during the 1975–76 season at Headingley, Leeds on Saturday 15 November 1975.

Millington played at prop in Hull Kingston Rovers' 26–11 victory over St. Helens in the 1977 BBC2 Floodlit Trophy Final during the 1977–78 season at Craven Park, Hull on Tuesday 13 December 1977.

Millington was a substitute in Hull Kingston Rovers' 10–5 victory over Hull F.C. in the 1979–80 Challenge Cup Final during the 1979–80 season at Wembley Stadium, London on Saturday 3 May 1980, in front of a crowd of 95,000, and was a substitute in the 9–18 defeat by Widnes in the 1980–81 Challenge Cup Final during the 1980–81 season at Wembley Stadium, London on Saturday 2 May 1981, in front of a crowd of 92,496.

Millington appeared as a substitute (replacing prop Roy Holdstock) in Hull Kingston Rovers' 4–12 defeat by Hull F.C. in the 1981–82 John Player Trophy Final during the 1981–82 season at Headingley, Leeds on Saturday 23 January 1982.

A benefit season/testimonial match for Steve Hartley and John Millington took place at Hull Kingston Rovers during the 1981–82 season, it raised £25,000 (based on increases in average earnings, this would be approximately £120,400 in 2018).

Millington was transferred to Kent Invicta in 1983 for a fee of £5,000, but the transfer fee was never paid and he returned to Hull KR two months later.

=== Representative honours ===
Millington won caps for England while at Hull Kingston Rovers in 1975 against France, and in 1981 against Wales.

Millington represented Yorkshire in games against Lancashire in 1974, 1975 & 1981.

== Club honours ==
- Championship: 1978–79, 1983–84, 1984–85.
- Challenge Cup: 1979–80.
- Yorkshire Cup: 1971–72, 1974–75.
- BBC2 Floodlit Trophy: 1977–78.
- John Player Special Trophy: 1984–85.
- Premiership: 1980–81, 1983–84.
- Hull KR Heritage Number: 737 (Debut v Swinton, 28th November 1970)
