= 1979–80 Challenge Cup =

Rugby competition

- Highest attendance: 95,000
- Broadcast partners: BBC
- Winners: Hull Kingston Rovers
- Runners-up: Hull F.C.
- Lance Todd Trophy: Brian Lockwood

The 1979–80 Challenge Cup, for sponsorship reasons known as the 1979–80 State Express Challenge Cup was the 79th staging of rugby league's oldest knockout competition, the Challenge Cup.

The final was the first Hull Cup final derby, with a heavy entourage of supporters from the East and West of the city making the trip to London. Hull Kingston Rovers defeated Hull 10–5 at Wembley before a crowd of 95,000.

The winner of the Lance Todd Trophy was Rovers' prop, Brian Lockwood, despite Rovers' Steve Hubbard's scoring 9 out of his side's 10 points.

This was Hull Kingston Rovers' first cup final win.

== First round ==
Date	Team one	Team two	Score
9 Feb	Wigan	Hull Kingston Rovers	13-18
10 Feb	Ace Amateurs	Widnes	5-22
10 Feb	Barrow	Batley	31-11
10 Feb	Blackpool	Bradford Northern	7-26
10 Feb	Dewsbury	Oldham	2-24
10 Feb	Featherstone Rovers	Halifax	13-17
10 Feb	Huddersfield	Whitehaven	11-4
10 Feb	Hull FC	Millom	33-10
10 Feb	Huyton	Salford	0-25
10 Feb	Keighley	Castleford	5-21
10 Feb	Leigh	Leeds	5-12
10 Feb	Rochdale Hornets	Doncaster	11-3
10 Feb	St Helens	Workington Town	16-0
10 Feb	Swinton	Warrington	2-25
10 Feb	Wakefield Trinity	Hunslet	24-17
10 Feb	York	Bramley	17-16

== Second round ==
Date	Team one	Team two	Score
23 Feb	St Helens	Bradford Northern	10-11
24 Feb	Barrow	Halifax	4-10
24 Feb	Huddersfield	Widnes	3-48
24 Feb	Hull FC	York	18-8
24 Feb	Hull Kingston Rovers	Castleford	28-3
24 Feb	Oldham	Wakefield Trinity	5-10
24 Feb	Rochdale Hornets	Salford	5-20
24 Feb	Warrington	Leeds	8-2

== Quarter-finals ==
Date	Team one	Team two	Score
8 Mar	Salford	Widnes	8-9
9 Mar	Bradford Northern	Hull FC	0-3
9 Mar	Halifax	Wakefield Trinity	7-3
9 Mar	Hull Kingston Rovers	Warrington	23-11

== Semi-finals ==
Date	Team one	Team two	Score
22 Mar	Halifax	Hull Kingston Rovers	7-20
29 Mar	Widnes	Hull FC	5-10

== Final ==
3 May 1980

Hull Kingston Rovers	10 – 5	Hull
Try: Hubbard; Goal: Hubbard (3); Drop goal: Millward	Report	Try: Wilby; Goal: Lloyd

Wembley, London
Attendance: 95,000
Referee: Fred Lindop (Wakefield)
Player of the Match: Brian Lockwood

FB	1	David Hall
RW	2	Steve Hubbard	(substituted off) 79'
RC	3	Mike Smith
LC	4	Steve Hartley
LW	5	Clive Sullivan
SO	6	Roger Millward (c)
SH	7	Allan Agar
PR	8	Roy Holdstock
HK	9	David Watkinson
PR	10	Brian Lockwood
SR	11	Paul Rose	(substituted off) 72'
SR	12	Phil Lowe
LF	13	Len Casey
Substitutions:
IC	14	Phil Hogan	(substituted on) 79'
IC	15	John Millington	(substituted on) 72'
Player-coach:
Roger Millward

FB	1	Paul Woods
RW	2	Graham Bray
RC	3	Graham Walters
LC	4	Tim Wilby
LW	5	Paul Prendiville
SO	6	John Newlove	(substituted off) 71'
SH	7	Clive Pickerill
PR	8	Keith Tindall
HK	9	Ron Wileman
PR	10	Charlie Stone	(substituted off) 71'
SR	11	Charlie Birdsall
SR	12	Sammy Lloyd
LF	13	Steve Norton (c)
Substitutions:
IC	14	Vince Farrar	(substituted on) 71'
IC	15	Brian Hancock	(substituted on) 71'
Coach:
Arthur Bunting
