= Keith Tindall =

England international rugby league footballer

Personal information
- Full name: Keith Tindall
- Born: Yorkshire, England

Playing information
- Position: Prop
Club
Years	Team	Pld	T	G	FG	P
1972–84	Hull FC	240	34	0	0	102
Representative
Years	Team	Pld	T	G	FG	P
1979	England	1	0	0	0	0

Keith Tindall (birth unknown) is an English former professional rugby league footballer who played in the 1970s and 1980s. He played at representative level for England, and at club level for Hull FC, as a prop.

== Playing career ==
=== International honours ===
Keith Tindall won a cap for England while at Hull in 1979 against France.

=== Challenge Cup Final appearances ===
Keith Tindall played at prop in Hull FC's 5-10 defeat by Hull Kingston Rovers in the 1980 Challenge Cup Final during the 1979–80 season at Wembley Stadium, London on Saturday 3 May 1980, in front of a crowd of 95,000, played at prop (Trevor Skerrett having played in the first match) in the 18-9 victory over Widnes in the 1982 Challenge Cup Final replay during the 1981–82 season at Elland Road, Leeds on Wednesday 19 May 1982, in front of a crowd of 41,171.

=== BBC2 Floodlit Trophy Final appearances ===
Keith Tindall played at prop in Hull FC's 13-3 victory over Hull Kingston Rovers in the 1979 BBC2 Floodlit Trophy Final during the 1979-80 season at The Boulevard, Kingston upon Hull on Tuesday 18 December 1979.

=== Testimonial match ===
Keith Tindall's Testimonial match at Hull FC took place in 1982.
