= Roger Millward =

Former GB & England international rugby league footballer

Roger Millward MBE
Personal information
- Born: 16 September 1947 Castleford, West Riding of Yorkshire, England
- Died: 2 May 2016 (aged 68)

Playing information
- Height: 5 ft 4 in (1.63 m)
- Weight: 10 st 12 lb (69 kg; 152 lb)
- Position: Wing, Stand-off, Scrum-half
Club
Years	Team	Pld	T	G	FG	P
1964–66	Castleford	40	16	35	0	118
1966–80	Hull Kingston Rovers	407	207	597	10	1825
1976	Cronulla-Sutherland	14	1	17	0	37
	Total	461	224	649	10	1980
Representative
Years	Team	Pld	T	G	FG	P
1965	GB Under 24	1	1	3	0	9
1966–79	Great Britain	29	17	14	1	81
1969–78	England	18	3	9	1	29
1967–75	Yorkshire	12	8	22	0	68

Coaching information
Club
Years	Team	Gms	W	D	L	W%
1980–91	Hull Kingston Rovers	390	231	15	144	59
1991–92	Halifax	48	22	0	26	46
1994	York Wasps
	Total	438	253	15	170	58
- Relatives: Brian Lockwood (cousin)

Roger Millward MBE (16 September 1947 – 2 May 2016) was an English rugby league footballer who played in the 1960s and 1970s, and coached in the 1980s and 1990s. A goal-kicking stand-off, he gained a high level of prominence in the sport in England by playing for Hull Kingston Rovers (captain) and Castleford, as well as representing Great Britain. Millward was appointed Member of the Order of the British Empire (MBE) in 1983. Nicknamed "Roger the Dodger" for his elusive running, he was inducted into the Rugby League Hall of Fame in 2000. Millward's ability placed him in the top bracket of rugby league halves to have ever played the game.

== Early life ==
Millward was born in Castleford, West Riding of Yorkshire, England.

== Domestic career ==
=== Castleford ===
Millward began his professional career in September 1964, signing for his home town club Castleford. He made his début on 3 October 1964 against Dewsbury Celtic, and won his first domestic honours in 1965 with Castleford picking up the Floodlit Trophy, playing scrum-half in a 4–0 victory over St. Helens. Millward played in the position of Stand-off and, due to the importance of such a position in rugby league, and due to the fact there were many more experienced players in the Castleford side at that time (such as Alan Hardisty and Keith Hepworth) Millward found it hard to break into the first team for any length of time. Millward played in Castleford's victory in the Yorkshire League during the 1964–65 season. Despite his lack of game experience, the international selectors were interested in Millward and picked him to play for the Great Britain team in March 1966 against France at the age of 18 and one of Great Britain's youngest players.

=== Hull Kingston Rovers ===
On 8 August 1966, Millward transferred from Castleford to Hull Kingston Rovers for a fee of £6,000 (equivalent to £98,000 in 2025), making his début for Hull Kingston Rovers at Hunslet on 15 August 1966; Millward was substituted at half time due to sustaining a leg injury. He helped the club win the 1966–67 Yorkshire Cup, playing as stand-off in a 25–12 victory over Featherstone Rovers at Headingley, Leeds on 15 October 1966, and helped to retain it in the following season, playing as stand-off in a 8–7 victory over cross-city rivals Hull F.C. at Headingley on 14 October 1967.

In the 1968 season, Millward finished as the top try scorer for Hull Kingston Rovers with a total of 38 tries in that season, picking up the supporters' player of the year award. Due to his good form, he was awarded a call up to the Great Britain squad for the 1968 World Cup which Britain lost to Australia.

In 1969, at the age of 21, Millward was given the captaincy of Hull Kingston Rovers and was also voted the supporters' player of the year for a second time. He was also honoured with the title of Rugby League Players No.6 "Player of the Year".

In the mid-1970s, Hull Kingston Rovers had become a dominant force in the world of rugby league thanks in part to Millward's playmaking abilities. Although Hull Kingston Rovers were now one of the top clubs in British rugby league, the major awards eluded Millward during his career at Hull Kingston Rovers, with just two more Yorkshire Cup winner's medals (1971–72, scoring four conversions in a 11–7 final victory against Castleford, and 1974–75, named man of the match and winning the White Rose Trophy) and a runner's up medal (1975–76, scoring a drop goal in a 11–15 final defeat by Leeds) along with two consecutive supporters' player of the year awards (1974–75, 1975–76).

In the 1976 close season, Millward decided to play for an Australian club, Cronulla-Sutherland. Millward made 14 appearances during his time in Sydney, and scored one try as well as kicking 17 points for the then struggling club before returning to Hull.

Millward's testimonial season took place during the 1976–77 season. During the season, Millward set a new record for Hull Kingston Rovers with the most tries scored in a season, scoring 160 tries in total, and was again voted the supporters' player of the season. Millward's testimonial season concluded with a testimonial match between Hull Kingston Rovers and the Great Britain national rugby league team at Craven Park on 31 July 1977, in which Hull Kingston Rovers were defeated heavily.

==== Player-coach ====
In March 1977, Millward was appointed as player-coach of Hull Kingston Rovers following the sudden death of incumbent manager Harry Poole. Millward played as scrum-half and coach in Hull Kingston Rovers' 26–11 victory over St. Helens in the 1977 BBC2 Floodlit Trophy Final during the 1977–78 season on 13 December 1977.

In the 1978–79 season, Hull Kingston Rovers were crowned Division One Champions for the first time since 1925. Millward and his Hull Kingston Rovers side qualified to play cross-city rivals Hull F.C., who had previously beaten Hull Kingston Rovers in a 3–13 defeat in the 1979 BBC2 Floodlit Trophy Final, in the 1980 Challenge Cup final at Wembley Stadium on 30 May 1980, playing as stand-off in front of a crowd of 95,000. Despite having his jaw broken midway through the first half from a high tackle by F.C. hooker Ron Wileman, Millward continued playing, inadvertently having his jaw set back into place by a tackle from rival captain and loose forward Steve Norton, and received the cup from Queen Elizabeth the Queen Mother at the end of the game.

After undergoing surgery to remove three wisdom teeth, Millward returned to Hull Kingston Rovers' 'A' team the following October in a match against Batley's 'A' team. However, he was forced to retire prematurely from rugby league after sustaining another broken jaw in a late tackle during the match, his fourth such injury in ten months.

== International career ==
By 1969, Millward had established himself as a full Great Britain international after his début at 18 years of age playing stand-off, in the 4–8 defeat by France at Central Park, Wigan on 5 March 1966, he went on to make 47 appearances for Great Britain, including 29 Tests. Millward went on tour with Great Britain a total of five times and also toured with the England national rugby league team on one occasion, captaining in both World Cup tournaments.

Millward’s international career was important as he was an integral member of Great Britain’s last Ashes winning Tour to Australia in 1970 and the last time any series was won against the Australians.

Millward played in the 1967 Test Series against the Kangaroo tourists in Britain, and the 1968 World Cup, both campaigns being unsuccessful. However, his finest hour as an international came in the Great Britain touring party of 1970. He was overlooked in favour of former Castleford club mate Alan Hardisty for the first Test against the Australians. The Great Britain team was heavily beaten 37–15 and wholesale changes were made for the 2nd Test. Millward was drafted into the side, where he gave a superb match winning performance scoring 20 points (2 tries, 7 goals) in a 28–7 win to square the series. This equalled the match points record for an individual against the Australians, which had previously been set by Lewis Jones.

The third Test decider was also successful and the Ashes regained. The 21–17 score did not reflect Great Britain’s superiority as they scored five tries to one, but were heavily penalised by the referee. Again, Millward rose to the occasion: with approximately five-minutes to go he scored the match and series winning try on the Sydney Cricket Ground (SCG). The try resulted from a thrust through the middle by the second rows, first by Jimmy Thompson, and then a bust by Doug Laughton, who then delivered a brilliant pass to Millward in space; Millward took the pass at pace and in turn then outstripped the opposition defence in an arcing run of over 40-yards to score. He also kicked three goals in the game.

Thereafter, Millward played with distinction for Great Britain in various internationals against the other nations, but a winning series against the Australians proved elusive.

Millward missed the 1970 Rugby League World Cup due to a broken fibula in his left leg. He was named in the Great Britain squad for the 1972 Rugby League World Cup, but later withdrew.

During the 1978 Kangaroo tour Millward captained Great Britain from stand-off in all three Test matches of the Ashes series which Australia won 2–1.

== Coaching ==
=== Hull Kingston Rovers ===
After retiring, Millward stayed on the coaching staff at Hull Kingston Rovers throughout the 1980s and early 1990s, guiding his team to another Challenge Cup Final and the Yorkshire Cup Final in the 1980–81 season. Hull Kingston Rovers lost 9–18 to Widnes in the Challenge Cup Final and lost 7–8 to Leeds in the Yorkshire Cup Final, however they did manage a Premiership trophy. Millward coached Hull Kingston Rovers to the 1981–82 John Player Trophy Final, which they lost to Hull F.C., and second in the Division One Championship.

During the 1983–84 season Hull Kingston Rovers dominated the scene with Millward's leadership, winning the League Championship as well as the Premiership to be the first team to complete the double and were rightfully crowned the 'Rugby League Team of the Year'. The 1984–85 season was almost as historic with victories in the John Player Trophy Final and being crowned Division One Champions for the fifth time, but lost out on the Premiership Final.

In 1984–85 Millward coached his side to the last major final of his tenure. The club were victorious in the 1984–85 John Player Special Trophy but were defeated 12–29 by Hull F.C. in the Yorkshire Cup Final, as well as being defeated 14–15 by Castleford in the Challenge Cup Final, consequently seeing the end of Hull Kingston Rovers' domination of English rugby league. Millward retired from the club at the end of the 1990–91 season, coinciding with its relegation to Division Two.

=== Halifax R.L.F.C. ===
In May 1991, Millward was appointed as coach of Halifax R.L.F.C., replacing incumbent coach Peter Roe in a two-year contract following the club's promotion to the First Division. Millward resigned from the club by mutual consent in December 1992 following a string of defeats, being replaced by Mal Reilly.

== Personal life ==
Roger Millward lived in Kippax, near Leeds. He was employed as a Premises Manager by Royds Specialist Language College, near Rothwell Sports Centre. He attended rugby league matches, mainly those involving his home town club Castleford. Roger Millward was the cousin of the rugby league footballer and coach Brian Lockwood.

In 2007 Millward had an operation to remove a cancerous growth in his jaw.

== Legacy ==
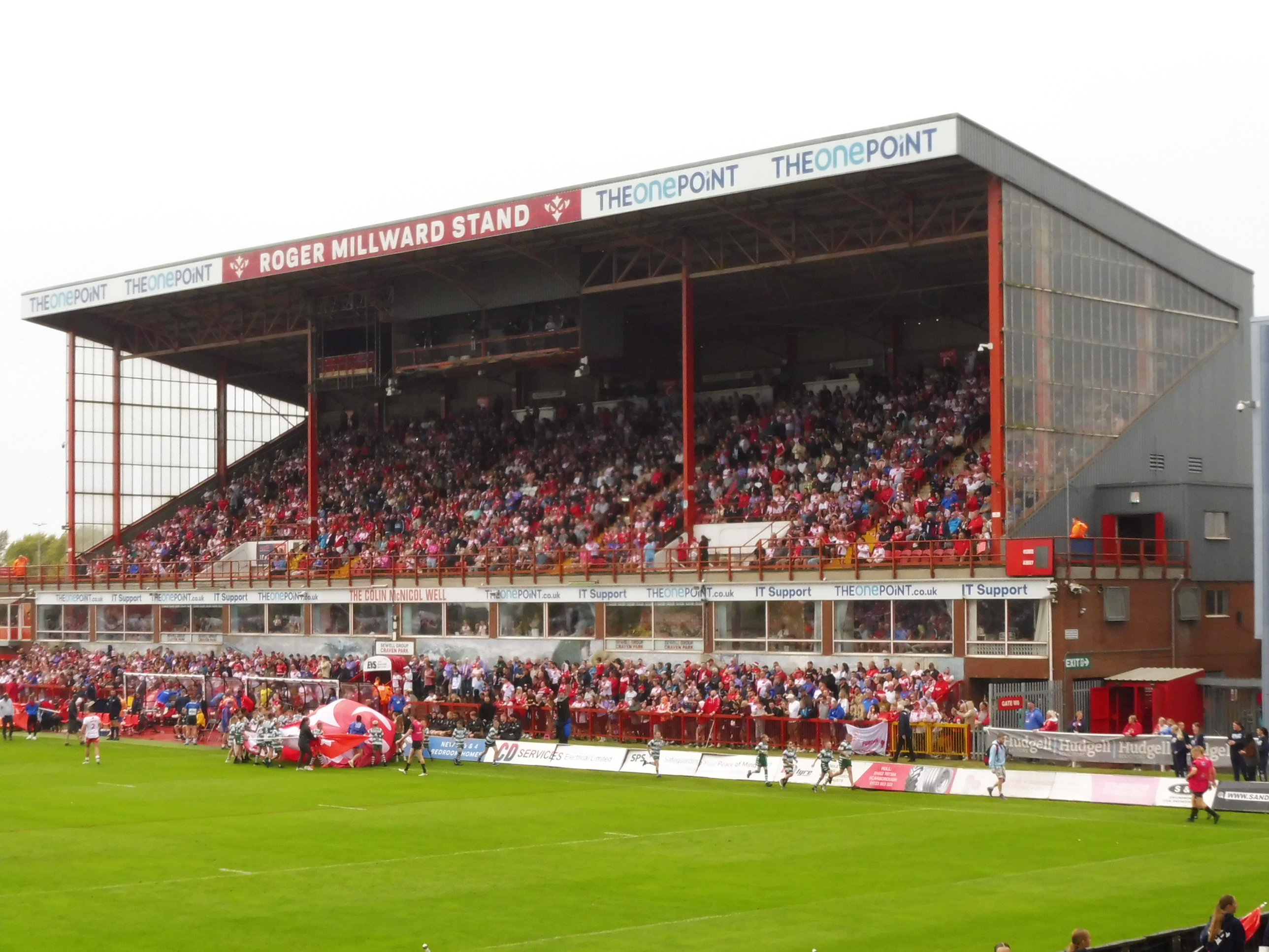
Craven Park's West Stand, pictured in 2025, is named after Roger Millward

Millward made 406 appearances for Hull Kingston Rovers in total, with 207 tries, over 600 goals and a grand total of 1,825 points making him the third highest points scorer in Hull Kingston Rovers' history. Millward holds the club's record of 207 tries (which beat the previous record set in the 1920s by wing Gilbert Austin by nearly 50 tries) and has also scored a total of eleven hat tricks for Hull Kingston Rovers, with one for Castleford and two for Great Britain as well as kicking more than ten goals per match.

Following his retirement from playing, Millward was appointed Member of the Order of the British Empire (MBE) in the 1983 New Year Honours by Queen Elizabeth II for services to rugby league and sport in Great Britain. The West Stand of the club's 'new' Craven Park stadium was officially renamed the 'Roger Millward Stand' on 23 February 2003, the day of a National League Cup fixture against Sheffield Eagles, with Millward and his family attending the renaming ceremony as guests of honour.

Bus operator Arriva Yorkshire honoured Roger Millward in an August 2009 ceremony at Castleford's Wheldon Road stadium, including his name among 13 West Yorkshire rugby league players voted by the public to be included in the 'Arriva Yorkshire Rugby League Dream Team'. Millward and the twelve other nominated players had their names printed on the side of 13 new single-deck buses purchased by the operator.

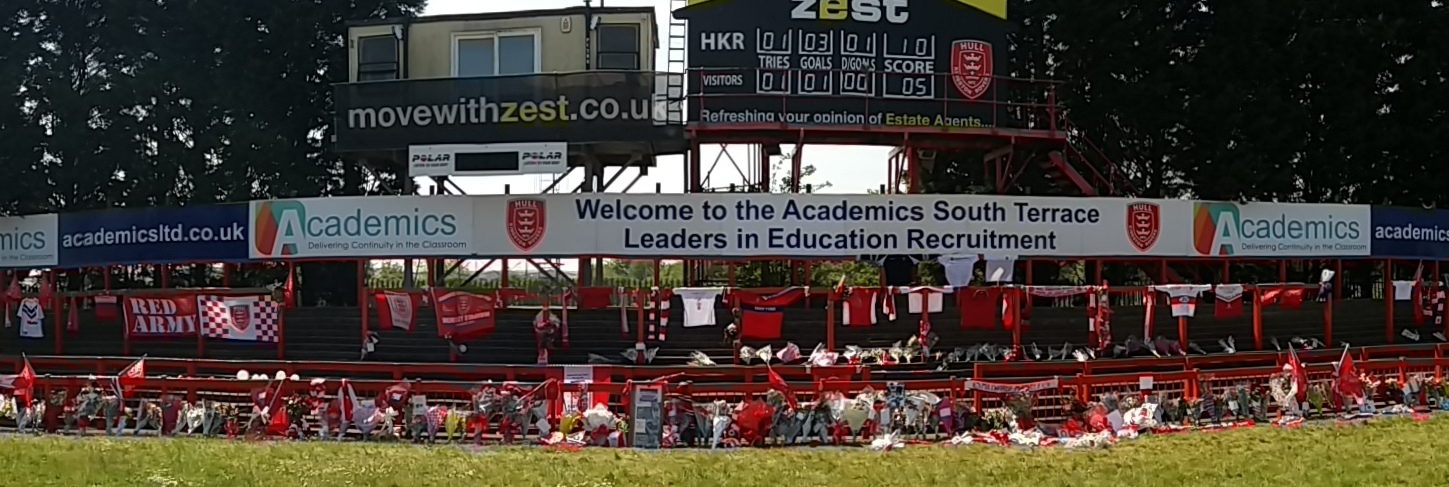
Tributes at Craven Park following Roger Millward's death in May 2016

Following Roger Millward's death on 2 May 2016, Hull Kingston Rovers retired the number 6 jersey. A jersey bearing the number was presented to his family at a memorial held prior to a Super League match against Widnes Vikings on 15 May 2016. The number 6 jersey was unretired in December 2024 for use by stand-off Mikey Lewis ahead of the Hull Kingston Rovers' treble-winning 2025 season.

In August 2016, it was announced that Hull's Garrison Road, the eastern edge of the A63 road bridging the River Hull and connecting east Hull's docks, would be renamed Roger Millward Way. A renaming ceremony was held in January 2018, with special red and white street signs installed by Hull City Council.

== Honours ==
As a player

- Challenge Cup: 1980
- Rugby League Championship: 1978–79
- BBC2 Floodlit Trophy: 1965–66, 1977–78
- Yorkshire Cup: 1966–67, 1967–68, 1971–72, 1974–75
- Rugby League Ashes: 1970

As a coach

- Rugby League Championship: 1983–84, 1984–85
- John Player Trophy: 1984–85
- Rugby League Premiership: 1980–81
- Yorkshire Cup: 1985–86
- Second Division Championship: 1989–90

Individual

- Open Rugby World XIII: 1978
- White Rose Trophy: 1975
- Rugby League Coach of The Year: 1985
- Players No.6 RL Player of The Year: 1969
- Hull KR Player of The Year: 1968, 1969, 1975, 1976, 1978
- Hull KR Record Try Scorer (1966–1980): 207 tries
- Rugby League Hall of Fame: 2000
- MBE: 1983
