= Roy Holdstock =

GB & England international rugby league footballer

Personal information
- Full name: Roy Gordon Holdstock
- Born: 26 December 1955 (age 70) Hull, East Riding of Yorkshire, England

Playing information
- Position: Prop
Club
Years	Team	Pld	T	G	FG	P
1972–85	Hull Kingston Rovers	254	22	0	1	67
1986–85/86	Wakefield Trinity	9	0	0	0	0
	Total	263	22	0	1	67
Representative
Years	Team	Pld	T	G	FG	P
1980–81	England	3	1	0	0	3
1980	Great Britain	2	0	0	1	0

Roy Gordon Holdstock (26 December 1955) is an English former professional rugby league footballer who played in the 1970s and 1980s. He played at representative level for Great Britain and England, and at club level for Hull Kingston Rovers and Wakefield Trinity, as a prop. Roy Holdstock was born in Kingston upon Hull, East Riding of Yorkshire, England.

== Playing career ==
=== Hull Kingston Rovers ===
In the 1979–80 season, Holdstock played in Hull Kingston Rovers' 3-13 defeat by Hull F.C. in the 1979 BBC2 Floodlit Trophy Final at the Boulevard, Hull on Tuesday 18 December 1979, and in Rovers' 10-5 victory over Hull F.C. in the 1979–80 Challenge Cup Final at Wembley Stadium, London, on Saturday 3 May 1980.

In the 1980–81 season, Holdstock played in the 7-8 defeat by Leeds in the 1980–81 Yorkshire Cup Final at Fartown, Huddersfield on Saturday 8 November 1980, and in the 9-18 defeat by Widnes, in the 1980–81 Challenge Cup Final at Wembley Stadium on Saturday 2 May 1981.

In the 1981–82 season, Holdstock played in Rovers' 4-12 defeat by Hull F.C. in the 1981–82 John Player Trophy Final at Headingley Rugby Stadium, Leeds on Saturday 23 January 1982.

Holdstock's Testimonial match at Hull Kingston Rovers took place in 1984.

=== Wakefield Trinity ===
Holdstock made his début for Wakefield Trinity during January 1986, and he played his last match for Wakefield Trinity during the 1985–86 season.

=== International honours ===
Holdstock won caps for England while at Hull Kingston Rovers in 1980 against Wales and France, in 1981 against Wales, and won caps for Great Britain while at Hull Kingston Rovers in 1980 against New Zealand (2 matches).
