= Clive Pickerill =

English rugby league footballer

Personal information
- Born: 19 March 1956 (age 69); Wakefield, West Riding of Yorkshire, England

Playing information
- Position: Scrum-half
Club
Years	Team	Pld	T	G	FG	P
1975–78	Castleford	35	4	0	0	12
1978–81	Hull F.C.	6	1	0	0	4
1981–85	Wakefield Trinity	79	9	0	16	44
	Total	120	14	0	16	60

Clive Pickerill (born 19 March 1956) is an English former professional rugby league footballer who played in the 1970s and 1980s. He played at club level for Castleford, Hull F.C. and Wakefield Trinity, as a scrum-half.

== Background ==
Pickerill's birth was registered in Wakefield district, West Riding of Yorkshire, England.

== Playing career ==
=== Castleford ===
Pickerill played scrum-half (replaced by substitute Gary Stephens) in Castleford's 17–7 victory over Featherstone Rovers in the 1977 Yorkshire Cup Final during the 1977–78 season at Headingley, Leeds on Saturday 15 October 1977.

=== Hull F.C. ===
Pickerill played scrum-half in Hull FC's 5–10 defeat by Hull Kingston Rovers in the 1980 Challenge Cup Final during the 1979–80 season at Wembley Stadium, London on Saturday 3 May 1980, in front of a crowd of 95,000.
