= Steve Hartley =

British rugby league player

Stephen Hartley
Personal information
- Full name: Stephen Hartley
- Born: Hull

Playing information
- Position: Stand-off
Club
Years	Team	Pld	T	G	FG	P
1970–85	Hull Kingston Rovers	369	191	0	0	592
Representative
Years	Team	Pld	T	G	FG	P
1980–81	Great Britain	3	1	0	0	3

Stephen "Steve" Hartley is a former professional rugby league footballer who played in the 1970s and 1980s. He played at representative level for Great Britain, and at club level for Hull Kingston Rovers, as a stand-off.

== Playing career ==
=== International honours ===
Steve Hartley won caps for Great Britain while at Hull Kingston Rovers in 1980 against New Zealand, and in 1981 against France (2 matches).

=== Challenge Cup Final Appearances ===
Steve Hartley played left-centre in Hull Kingston Rovers' 10–5 victory over Hull F.C. in the 1979–80 Challenge Cup Final during the 1979–80 season at Wembley Stadium, London on Saturday 3 May 1980, in front of a crowd of 95,000, and played stand-off in the 9–18 defeat by Widnes in the 1980–81 Challenge Cup Final during the 1980–81 season at Wembley Stadium, London on Saturday 2 May 1981, in front of a crowd of 92,496.

=== County Cup Final Appearances ===
Steve Hartley appeared as a substitute (replacing Loose forward Dave Hall) in Hull Kingston Rovers' 12–29 defeat by Hull F.C. in the 1984–85 Yorkshire Cup Final during the 1984–85 season at Boothferry Park, Kingston upon Hull on Saturday 27 October 1984.

=== BBC2 Floodlit Trophy Final Appearances ===
Steve Hartley played stand-off, and scored a try in Hull Kingston Rovers' 26–11 victory over St. Helens in the 1977 BBC2 Floodlit Trophy Final during the 1977-78 season at Craven Park, Hull on Tuesday 13 December 1977.

=== John Player Trophy Final Appearances ===
Steve Hartley played stand-off in Hull Kingston Rovers' 4–12 defeat by Hull F.C. in the 1981–82 John Player Trophy Final during the 1981–82 season at Headingley, Leeds on Saturday 23 January 1982.

=== Rugby League Premiership Trophy Final Appearances ===
Steve Hartley played stand-off and scored an 80-yard try in Hull Kingston Rovers' 11–7 victory over Hull F.C. in the Final of the 1980-81 Rugby League Premiership during the 1980–81 season

=== 1982 Australian Tour / 1983 Queensland Tour ===
Hartley played stand-off in Hull Kingston Rovers' 30–10 defeat against the 1982 Kangaroos, memorably scoring one and making the other of Rovers two tries, Rovers were the only side to score more than one try against them.

Hartley played stand-off in Hull Kingston Rovers' 8–6 victory over Queensland as they toured Papua New Guinea and England during the 1983–84 Rugby Football League season

=== Nickname ===
Known to Rovers Supporters as 'The Dancer', there was no finer sight than seeing Hartley running onto the ball at pace with his head back gliding around opposition defenders.

=== Testimonial match ===
A benefit season/testimonial match for Steve Hartley and John Millington took place at Hull Kingston Rovers during the 1981–82 season, it raised £25,000 (based on increases in average earnings, this would be approximately £120,400 in 2018).

== Honours ==
Great Britain International - 1980, 1981

Challenge Cup Winner - 1979/80 (R/Up - 1980/81)

Rugby League Championship Winner- 1978/79, 1983/84, 1984/85 (R/Up - 1982/83)

John Player Trophy R/Up 1981/82

Rugby League Premiership Trophy Winner - 1980/81

BBC2 Trophy Winner - 1977/78

Yorkshire Cup R/Up - 1984/85

Rugby League Top Try Scorer - 1978/79

Hull KR Heritage Number - 741 (Debut v Wakefield Trinity, 2nd January 1971)
