= Graham Walters =

Wales international rugby league footballer

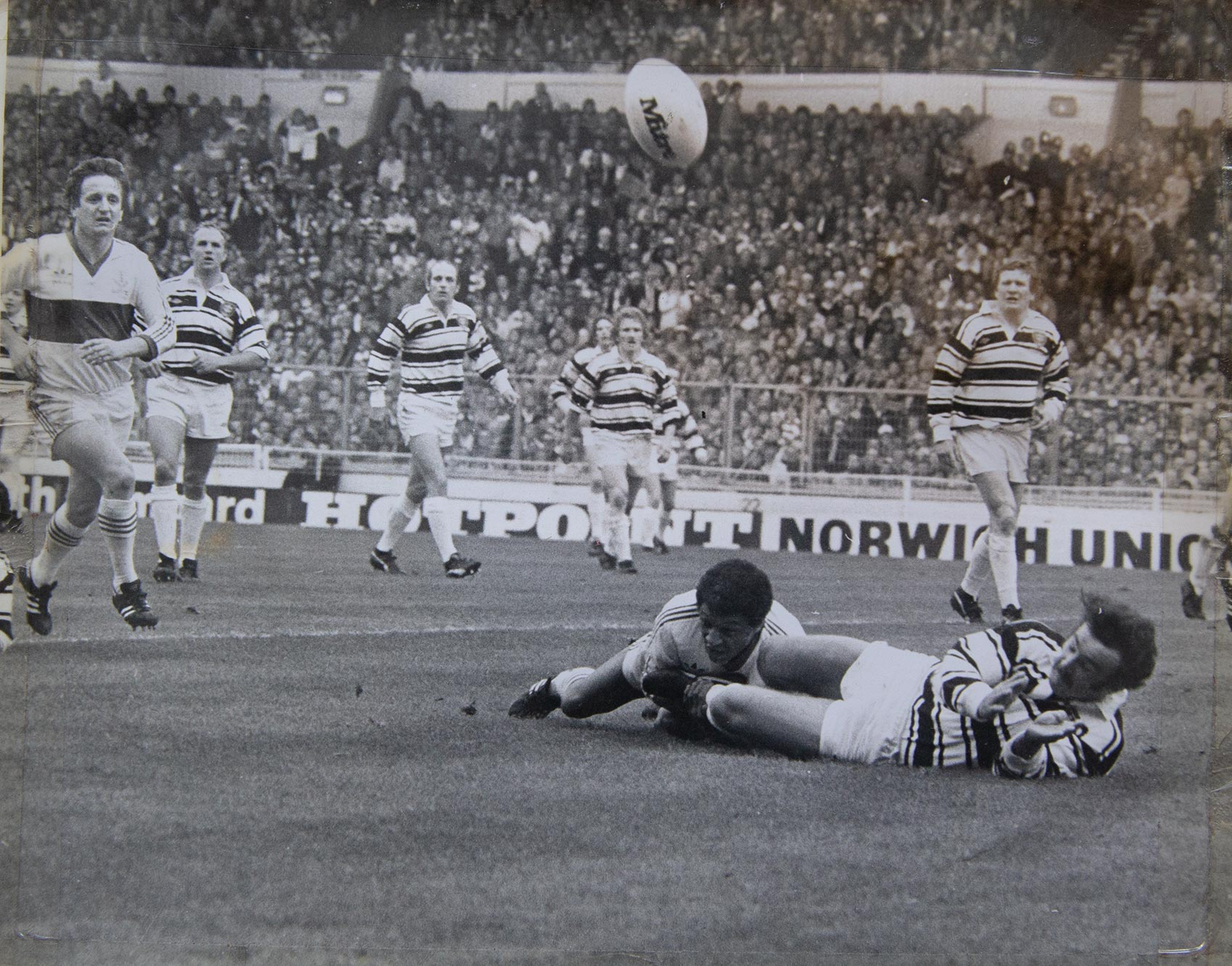
- Graham Walters in Action for Hull F.C.

Personal information
- Full name: Graham Walters
- Born: 1 March 1953 (age 73) Carmarthen, Wales

Playing information

Rugby union
- Position: Centre

Rugby league
- Position: Centre
Club
Years	Team	Pld	T	G	FG	P
1980–82	Hull FC	22	7	0	0	21
1982	Wakefield Trinity	23	5	0	0	15
1983–85	Cardiff City (Bridgend) Blue Dragons	8	2	0	0	8
1986	Runcorn Highfield	4	1	0	0	4
	Total	57	15	0	0	48
Representative
Years	Team	Pld	T	G	FG	P
1980–84	Wales	3	0	0	0	0
- Military career
- Allegiance: United Kingdom
- Branch: British Army
- Units: Welsh Guards; Special Air Service
- Conflicts: Northern Ireland

Graham Walters (born 1 March 1953 in Carmarthen, South Wales) is a Welsh rugby union and professional rugby league footballer who played in the 1970s and 1980s; he is also a member of the Welsh Guards and the British Army. He played club-level rugby union (RU) for Llanelli, Carmarthen Quins and Athletic, Kidwelly RFC, Hendy RFC, Carmarthen County Rugby, and Swansea RFC, as a Centre, and representative level rugby league (RL) for Wales, and at club-level for Hull FC, Wakefield Trinity, and Cardiff City (Bridgend) Blue Dragons, as a centre.

== Rugby career ==
=== Hull FC ===
Walters joined rugby league club Hull FC in October 1979. He played at centre in Hull's 5–10 defeat by Hull Kingston Rovers in the 1980 Challenge Cup Final during the 1979–80 season at Wembley Stadium, London on Saturday 3 May 1980, in front of a crowd of 95,000. Hull FC also won the BBC 2 Floodlit trophy in the same year.

=== International honours ===
Graham Walters won a cap for Wales (RL) while at Hull, and Bridgend Blue Dragons 1980-1984, earning 2 caps + 1 cap (interchange/substitute).

== Military career ==
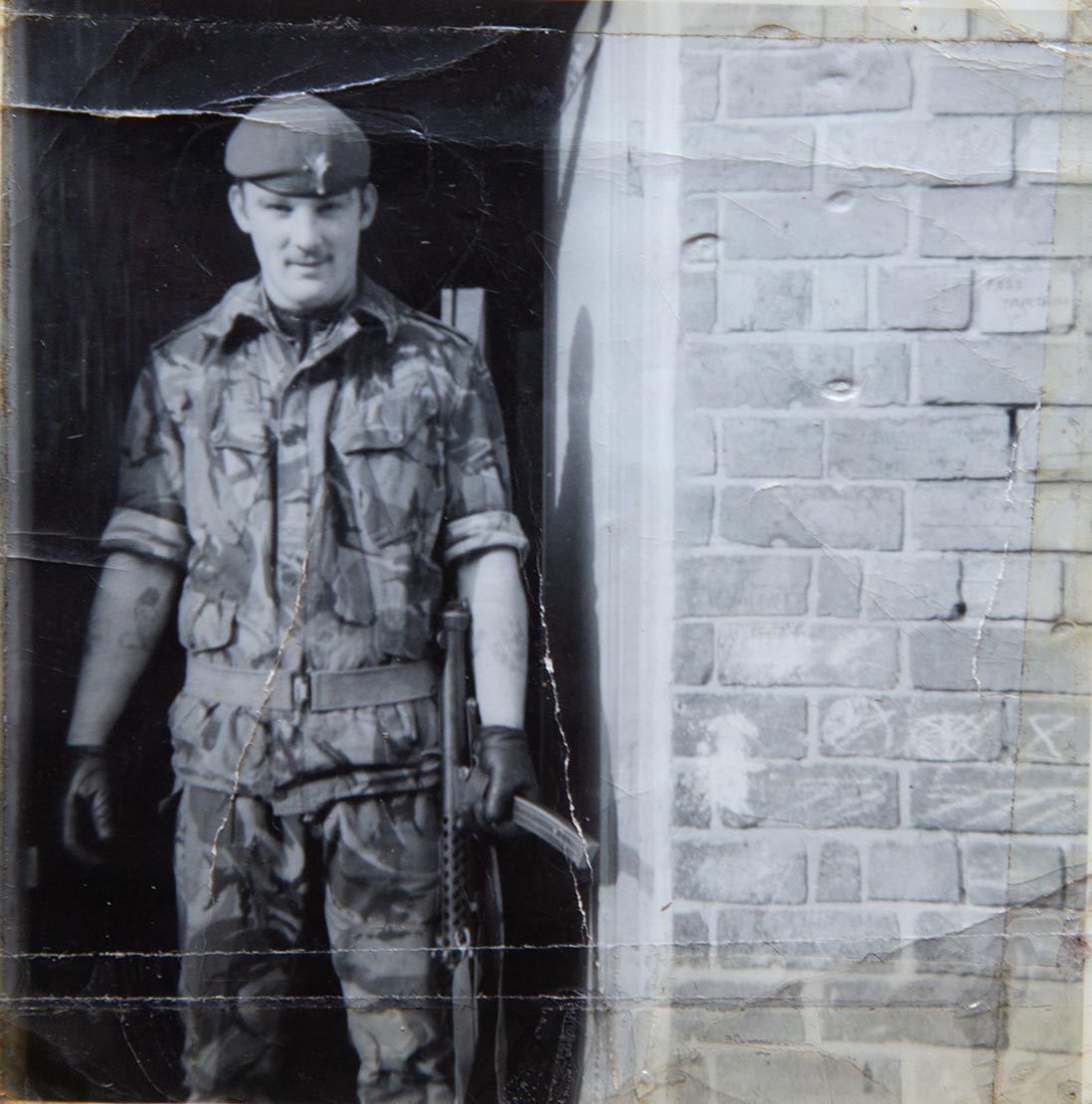
Graham Walters, Military Career

At the age of 15, Graham Walters joined the junior Welsh Guards as a boy soldier. He was soon made Lance Corporal and climbed his way up the ranks, eventually making junior Sergeant Major. He took on the role of PTI instructor and speedily achieved the status of Judo black belt, and also became ABA champion boxer of the British Army. With his enormous talent for sport, it was inevitable he started to play rugby for the Welsh Guards and the British Army, previously playing for his home country Wales for the under 15-17s.

Graham Walters joined the 1st Battalion of the Welsh Guards after leaving the position of junior guardsman. Being a marksman of all weapons, he also was assigned as a sniper. Following on from this, he became a Guards Para for 6 months, then was attached to the G-squadron of the SAS regiment; he did 4 tours of Northern Ireland of which one was undercover. During this time, Graham Walters was in active service in Belize and Cyprus.

== Note ==
Before the start of the 1984/85 season, Cardiff City Blue Dragons relocated from Ninian Park in Cardiff, to Coychurch Road Ground in Bridgend, and were renamed Bridgend Blue Dragons.
