= Ron Wileman =

English rugby league player

Personal information
- Born: c. 1954; Grimethorpe, Yorkshire, England
- Died: November 2009 (aged 55)

Playing information
- Position: Hooker
Club
Years	Team	Pld	T	G	FG	P
1973–79	York	89	17	0	0	51
1979–84	Hull F.C.	87	23	0	0	69
	Total	176	40	0	0	120
Representative
Years	Team	Pld	T	G	FG	P
1978–79	Yorkshire	2	0	0	0	0

Ron Wileman (c. 1954 – November 2009) was an English rugby league footballer who played as a hooker. He played for York between 1973 and 1979, and Hull F.C. between 1979 and 1984. He also represented Yorkshire.

== Playing career ==
=== York ===
Born in Grimethorpe, Yorkshire, Wileman started his rugby league career with York. He spent six seasons with the club, scoring 17 tries in 89 appearances. He played for York in the 1978 Yorkshire Cup final, losing 8–18 to Bradford Northern.

=== Hull F.C. ===
Wileman was signed by Hull F.C. for a fee of £25,000.

He won his first honours with the club in the 1979 BBC2 Floodlit Trophy, playing in the 13–3 win against Hull Kingston Rovers in the final.

Wileman played in the 1980 Challenge Cup final in a 5–10 defeat Hull Kingston Rovers. Wileman is usually remembered in this game for his late tackle on Roger Millward, which broke Millward's jaw.

Wileman played in the 12–4 win against Hull Kingston Rovers in the 1981–82 John Player Trophy final. He scored the only try in the game, which is regarded as one of the most memorable moments of his career. He also played in the 1981–82 Challenge Cup final against Widnes, which ended in a 14–14 draw, but missed out on the replay due to injury.

Wileman played in the 13–2 win over Castleford in the 1983 Yorkshire Cup final. In total, he scored 23 tries in 87 games for Hull.

=== Representative career ===
Wileman made his debut for Yorkshire on 27 September 1978 in a 7–23 defeat against Lancashire. He made one other appearance for the team on 29 August 1979 in a 13–17 defeat against Cumbria.

== Death ==
Wileman died of a heart attack, aged 55.
