= BBC2 Floodlit Trophy =

British rugby league competition (1965–1980)

- Sport: Rugby league
- Instituted: 1965
- Ceased: 1980
- Country: United Kingdom (RFL)
- Last winners: Hull (1979)
- Most titles: Castleford (4 titles)
- Broadcast partner: BBC TV

The BBC2 Floodlit Trophy (also known as the BBC2 Television Trophy) was an annual knockout competition for British rugby league clubs. Organised by the Rugby Football League (RFL), the competition was open to all professional clubs with floodlights installed.

First held in 1965–66, games were typically played during the middle of the week, and were broadcast on BBC television. Eight teams competed during the first season, but the tournament was quickly expanded as more teams erected floodlights at their grounds.

The competition's most successful club was Castleford, who won the trophy four times, including the inaugural tournament. The last staging of the competition was in 1979–80, won by Hull, before the competition was cancelled due to financial cutbacks by the BBC.

== History ==
The tournament was not Rugby League's first foray into evening television; the 1955–56 season saw a tournament titled the Independent Television Floodlit Trophy. Eight clubs participated in a series of games played at football grounds in the London area, with Warrington eventually running out 43–18 victors over Leigh.

In 1965, the rugby league management committee agreed to the televising of a mid-week floodlit competition consisting of eight teams, with director of BBC2, broadcaster David Attenborough, being instrumental in its creation. When the competition was first mooted only a few grounds were equipped with floodlights, but the tournament prompted several clubs to apply for loans from the Rugby Football League to install them. The tournament was intended to coincide with the launch of BBC2 in the North of England.

The tournament was played during the early part of the season. Each week, one match would be played under floodlights on a Tuesday evening; the second half of this match that would be broadcast live on BBC2. Non-televised matches were played at various times, depending on clubs' commitments in more prestigious tournaments. Despite the title many matches did not take place under floodlights; clubs such as Barrow and Bramley (for example) did not possess adequate lighting.

The first season, 1965–66, eight clubs - Castleford, Leeds, Leigh, Oldham, St. Helens, Swinton, Warrington and Widnes took part. Seven of the eight teams had floodlights and Leeds installed theirs the following season.

The four-tackles-then-a-scrum rule was first introduced in the competition's second season, in October 1966, before being implemented in all competitions by December.

Castleford won the trophy in the first season, 1965–66 and won the trophy the most times, on three more occasions 1966–67, 1967–68 and 1976–77.

Despite disagreements over shirt sponsorship in the early 1970s, Rugby League remained a mainstay of BBC Television during the 1970s, and 1980s, although the commitment to the Floodlit Trophy decreased before financial cutbacks at the BBC lead to its cancellation after the 1979–80 competition. In the last final, Hull F.C. beat local rivals Hull Kingston Rovers.

== List of finals ==
Year	Season	Winners	Score	Runner-up	Venue	Date
1965	1965–66 season	Castleford	4–0	St. Helens	Knowsley Road, St. Helens	Tuesday, 14 December 1965
1966	1966–67 season	Castleford	7–2	Swinton	Wheldon Road, Castleford	Tuesday, 20 December 1966
1967	1967–68 season	Castleford	8–5	Leigh	Headingley, Leeds	Saturday, 16 January 1968
1968	1968–69 season	Wigan	7–4	St. Helens	Central Park, Wigan	Tuesday, 17 December 1968
1969	1969–70 season	Leigh	11–6	Wigan	Central Park, Wigan	Tuesday, 16 December 1969
1970	1970–71 season	Leeds	9–5	St. Helens	Headingley, Leeds	Tuesday, 15 December 1970
1971	1971–72 season	St. Helens	8–2	Rochdale Hornets	Knowsley Road, St. Helens	Tuesday, 14 December 1971
1972	1972–73 season	Leigh	5–0	Widnes	Central Park, Wigan	Tuesday, 19 December 1972
1973	1973–74 season	Bramley	15–7	Widnes	Naughton Park, Widnes	Tuesday, 18 December 1973
1974	1974–75 season	Salford	0–0	Warrington	The Willows, Salford	Tuesday, 17 December 1974
	(replay)	Salford	10–5	Warrington	Wilderspool, Warrington	Tuesday, 28 January 1975
1975	1975–76 season	St. Helens	22–2	Dewsbury	Knowsley Road, St. Helens	Tuesday, 16 December 1975
1976	1976–77 season	Castleford	12–4	Leigh	Hilton Park, Leigh	Tuesday, 14 December 1976
1977	1977–78 season	Hull Kingston Rovers	26–11	St. Helens	Craven Park, Hull	Tuesday, 13 December 1977
1978	1978–79 season	Widnes	13–7	St. Helens	Knowsley Road, St. Helens	Tuesday, 12 December 1978
1979	1979–80 season	Hull F.C.	13–3	Hull Kingston Rovers	The Boulevard, Hull	Tuesday, 18 December 1979

=== Wins by club ===
	Club	Wins	Winning years
1	Castleford	4	1965, 1966, 1967, 1976
2=	Leigh	2	1969, 1972
	St Helens	2	1971, 1975
4=	Bramley	1	1973
	Hull	1	1979
	Hull Kingston Rovers	1	1977
	Leeds	1	1970
	Salford	1	1974
	Widnes	1	1978
	Wigan	1	1968

=== Records from the BBC2 Floodlit Trophy Competition ===
	Record		Holder	
In Final				
Team				
	Most appearances	7	St. Helens	
	Most wins	4	Castleford	
	Highest Score	26-11	Hull Kingston Rovers	St. Helens 1977
	Widest margin	22-2	St. Helens 1977	Dewsbury 1975
	Biggest Attendance		18500	Hull F.C. v Hull Kingston Rovers 1979
	Highest receipts		16605	Hull F.C. v Hull Kingston Rovers 1979
Individual				
	Most tries	2	Roy Mathias	St. Helens v Dewsbury 1975
		2	Peter Glynn	St. Helens v Hull Kingston Rovers 1977
		2	Gerald "Ged" Dunn	Hull Kingston Rovers v St. Helens 1977
		2	Stuart Wright	Widnes v St. Helens 1978
	Most goals	4	Ron Willett	Castleford v Leigh 1967
		4	Kel Coslett	St. Helens v Rochdale Hornets 1971
		4	Dave Hall	Hull Kingston Rovers v St. Helens 1977
	Most points	8		The last 3 goal kickers
In Competition				
	Highest Score	51-0	St. Helens	Dewsbury (1977)
	Greatest winning margin	51-0	St. Helens	Dewsbury (1977)
	Highest Aggregate score	54-16	Leeds	Hull F.C. (1973)
	Other high scores	47-5	St. Helens	Castleford (1978)
		47-11	Leeds	Bramley (1978
		'45-17	St. Helens	Rochdale Hornets (1979)
