= The Boulevard (stadium) =

Former stadium in Kingston upon Hull, England

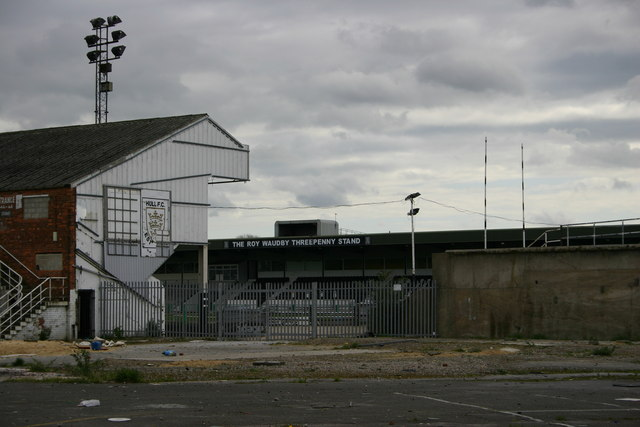
- The Boulevard in May 2006
- Interactive map of The Boulevard
- Full name: The Boulevard
- Location: Kingston upon Hull, East Riding of Yorkshire, England
- Coordinates: 53°44′22″N 0°22′9″W
- Capacity: 10,500
- Record attendance: 21,504 - Great Britain vs Australia, 5 November 1921

Construction
- Built: 1895
- Opened: 1895
- Closed: 2009
- Demolished: 2010

Tenants
- Hull F.C. (1895–2002); Hull Vikings; Hull KR (1892–1895)

The Boulevard was a multi-purpose stadium in Hull, England, from 1895 to 2010. The venue primarily hosted rugby league matches, speedway and greyhound racing. The ground had a strong connection with the city's former fishing industry, being not far from Hessle Road.

== History ==
=== Rugby league ===
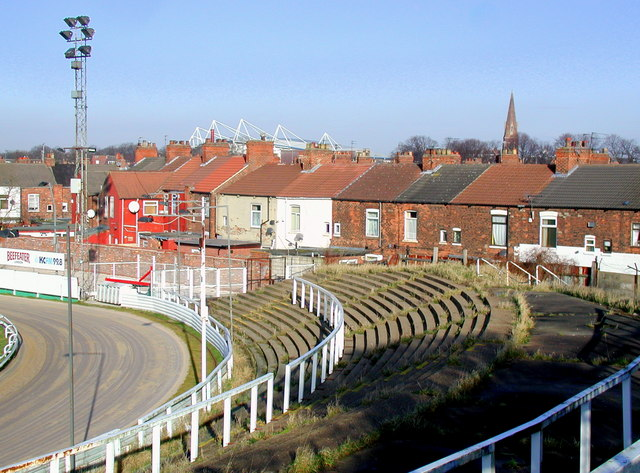
Looking north towards the backs of houses on Carrington Street

The Boulevard was mainly used for rugby league matches and was the home stadium of Hull F.C. before the opening of KC Stadium. The main entrance was on Airlie Street, giving rise to Hull FC's nickname as 'the Airlie Birds'. When it closed, the stadium's capacity was 10,500 spectators.

The ground consisted of three stands, the most popular being the 4,000 capacity Threepenny Stand, where the majority of singing and chanting occurred. It was given its name when the stadium opened as it was 3 old pence for entry. In July 1985, following the Bradford City stadium fire, the Threepenny Stand was closed due to the stand being a wooden structure. Following club and fan appeals, the stand was partially reopened with a severely reduced capacity of 1,500 the following September, with fans only permitted to use the bottom four steps of concrete terracing. The Threepenny Stand was partially demolished ahead of the opening of a new stand in November 1990, an all-seater stand by order of Kingston upon Hull City Council under the recommendations of the Taylor Report, and the remaining quarter of the old stand was demolished in 1995 to facilitate a standing terrace extension to the new stand.

The final match of rugby league at The Boulevard was a 2003 Challenge Cup third round fixture between Skirlaugh A.R.L.F.C. and York City Knights on 26 January 2003, moved to The Boulevard due to Skirlaugh's home venue at the Twin Towers Sports Complex in Hedon not being able to support a larger capacity. York City Knights recorded their first ever win as a club by defeating Skirlaugh 20–8 in front of an attendance of 943 spectators.

==== Test matches ====
The Boulevard also hosted four matches in various Rugby League World Cups, as well as various Test matches against visiting nations such as Australia and New Zealand:

Test No.	Date	Result	Attendance	Notes
1	5 November 1921	Australia def Great Britain 16–2	21,504	1921–22 Ashes series
2	13 November 1927	England def New Zealand 21–11	7,000	1926–27 England vs New Zealand series
3	25 October 1970	New Zealand def France 16–15	3,824	1970 Rugby League World Cup Group Stage
4	6 March 1983	Great Britain def France 17–5	6,055	1983 Great Britain vs France series
5	7 March 1992	Great Britain def France 36–0	5,250	1989-1992 Rugby League World Cup Group Stage
6	10 October 1995	Papua New Guinea drew with Tonga 28–28	5,121	1995 Rugby League World Cup Group B
7	23 October 1999	England def France 50–20	3,068	1999 Anglo-French Challenge
8	4 November 2000	Australia def. Russia 110–4	3,044	2000 Rugby League World Cup Group 1

==== Tour matches ====
Other than Hull F.C. club games, The Boulevard also saw Hull and the county team Yorkshire and a combined Hull F.C. and Hull Kingston Rovers XIII play host to international touring teams from Australia (sometimes playing as Australasia) and New Zealand from 1907 to 2002, with the exception of the 1980 New Zealand rugby league tour of Great Britain and France, which was played at Boothferry Park. Hull F.C.'s final match played at The Boulevard was a test match against New Zealand on 22 October 2002 during New Zealand's 2002 tour, seeing Hull F.C. defeated 11–28 by the tourists.

Game	Date	Result	Attendance	Notes
1	16 November 1907	New Zealand def. Hull F.C. 18–13		1907–08 All Golds tour
2	5 November 1908	Australia def. Yorkshire 24–11	3,500	1908–09 Kangaroo Tour
3	30 January 1909	Hull F.C. def. Australia 9–8	10,000	1908–09 Kangaroo Tour
4	4 November 1911	Australasia def. Hull F.C. 26–7	6,000	1911–12 Kangaroo tour
5	24 December 1921	Australasia def. Hull F.C. 26–10	12,000	1921–22 Kangaroo tour
6	4 November 1929	Australia def. Hull F.C. 35–2	10,000	1929–30 Kangaroo tour
7	25 December 1933	Australia def. Hull F.C. 19–5	16,341	1933–34 Kangaroo tour
8	23 October 1937	Australia def. Hull F.C. 22–12	15,000	1937–38 Kangaroo tour
9	23 September 1948	Australia def. Hull F.C. 13–3	16,616	1948–49 Kangaroo tour
10	8 September 1952	Australia def. Hull F.C. 28–0	15,364	1952–53 Kangaroo tour
11	15 October 1956	Australia def. Hull F.C. / Hull KR XIII 37–14	17,172	1956–57 Kangaroo tour
12	26 October 1959	Australia def. Hull F.C. / Hull KR XIII 29–9	15,944	1959–60 Kangaroo tour
13	12 October 1963	Australia def. Hull F.C. / Hull KR XIII 23–10	10,481	1963–64 Kangaroo tour
14	29 October 1978	Australia def. Hull F.C. 34–2	10,723	1978 Kangaroo tour
15	16 November 1982	Australia def. Hull F.C. 13–7	16,049	1982 Kangaroo tour
16	16 November 1986	Australia def. Hull F.C. 48–0	8,213	1986 Kangaroo tour
17	14 November 1990	Australia def. Hull F.C. 34–4	13,081	1990 Kangaroo tour
18	22 October 2002	New Zealand def. Hull F.C. 28–11	12,092	2002 New Zealand Kiwis tour

=== Speedway ===
In 1971, promoter Ian Thomas brought back speedway to Hull for the first time since 1949. The Hull Vikings raced in the British League Division Two and it proved to be exceedingly popular with large crowds cheering on the team each Wednesday. Hull had the dubious distinction of being the last league speedway team ever to appear at the famous West Ham Stadium, on 23 May 1972, when they beat the closing Hammers 40–38. Subsequent years saw their promotion to the first division and the inclusion of world champions Barry Briggs, Ivan Mauger and Egon Müller to ride for the team. Promotional changes, falling crowds and financial problems eventually saw the Vikings demise until their resurrection some years later at Hull's other rugby league and speedway stadium, Craven Park.

The Boulevard was also the host of the annual Yorkshire Television Trophy meeting during the 1970s, and early 1980s. With the British leagues home to not only the best British riders such as 1976 World Champion Peter Collins, 1980 World Champion Michael Lee, Dave Jessup and Malcolm Simmons, but also to many top class riders from around the world including World Champions Briggs, Mauger, Müller, Ole Olsen and Bruce Penhall, plus Billy Sanders, Dennis Sigalos, Shawn and Kelly Moran, and Phil Crump (the inaugural Yorkshire TV Trophy winner in 1974), the meetings often attracted fields which were as good in quality as many World Finals.

The 380 metres (420 yards) long speedway track surrounded the rugby league field without intersecting it at the corners. This saw the Boulevard have fast, almost 100 metre long straights and tight bends. The run off the corners onto the straights was narrow due to the fence not following the curve of the track but being straight from back in the turns.

=== Greyhound racing ===
==== 1927–1934 ====
The stadium first hosted greyhound racing in 1927 when the Associated Greyhound Racecourses Ltd promoted a meeting on 2 July. The track was soon to be one of three greyhound stadiums operating in Hull after two more followed suit; within a year, Craven Park stadium had opened and in 1934, the Craven Street track opened, the latter proving to be short-lived.

Greyhound racing came to an end at The Boulevard for the first time on 11 December 1948. Despite the Boulevard being considerably bigger than Craven Park, the difference in popularity and tote turnover was significant; in 1947, the tote turnover of Craven Park was £578,628 compared to the Boulevard's £23,263.

==== 2003–2009 ====
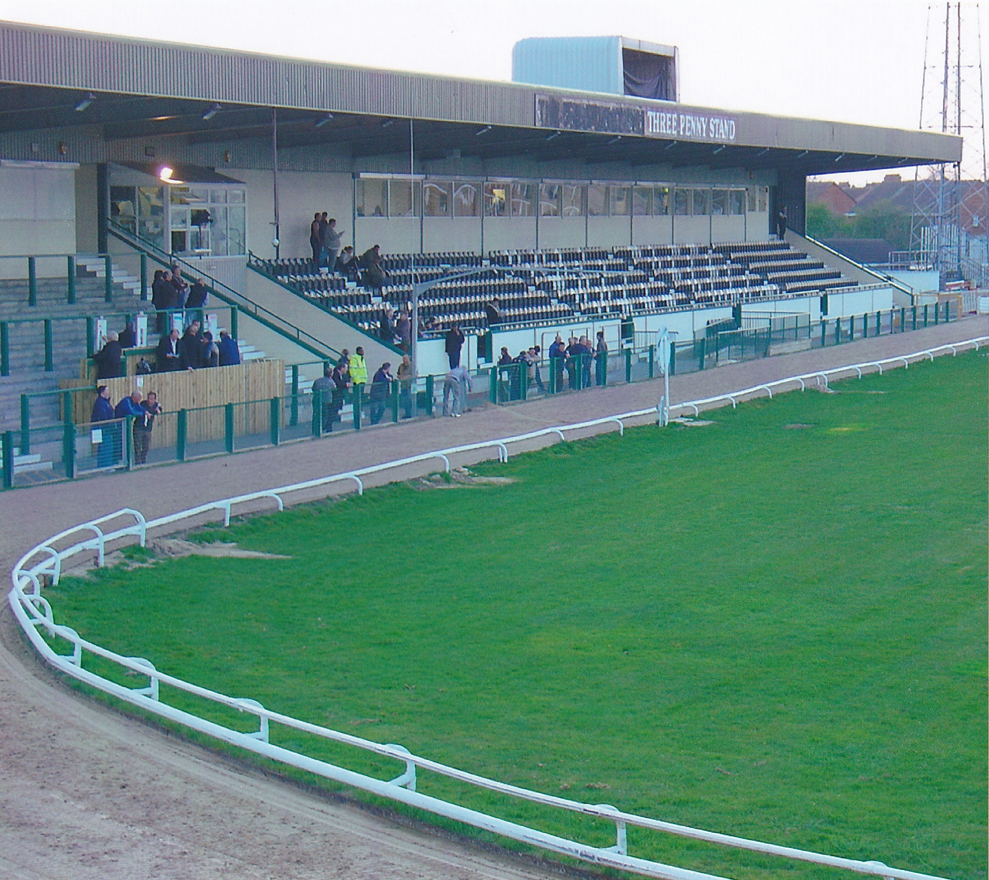
Greyhound track at The Boulevard c. 2003

In 2002, Hull F.C. moved to the newly opened KC Stadium, entering into a groundshare agreement with association football club Hull City A.F.C. and putting The Boulevard under imminent threat of closure. The greyhound operation had just finished at the New Craven Park and transferred to the Boulevard, saving the stadium from closure.

The track was constructed with a circumference of 387 m (1,270 ft) and distances of 270 m (890 ft), 460 m (1,510 ft), 655 m (2,149 ft) and 845 m (2,772 ft). Racing started in December 2003, with Friday and Saturday night racing under the supervision of Racing Manager, David Gray.

After Hull City Council refused to extend the greyhound racing lease, the stadium remained unused until 25 October 2007, when it reopened again under a three-year lease for the first time in 28 months. A £250,000 refurbishment of the stadium was carried out, racing changed to Thursday and Saturday nights, and Mick Smith was appointed as Racing Manager.

==== Track records ====
Extended content

Distance metres	Greyhound	Time	Date
270	Top Matt	16.92	6 December 2003
270	Killavarrig Ruby	16.53	29 October 2004
270	Centenarys Pass	16.37	21 November 2004
270	Ballymac Charley	16.36	22 December 2007
270	Bradford Lad	16.35	4 October 2008
460	Hesley Nikita	29.06	27 December 2003
460	Pamelas Nikita	29.03	27 December 2003
460	Thorsman	28.87	17 January 2004
460	Malton Merlin	28.75	14 February 2004
460	Pamelas Pride	28.51	28 February 2004
460	Quiet Chant	28.46	24 April 2004
460	Parkview Dot	28.38	27 December 2004
460	Zero to Hero	28.28	10 September 2005
460	Rushmoor Major	28.27	3 November 2007
460	Stevens Court	28.15	22 December 2007
460	Linfit Robert	28.02	22 December 2007
460	Tango Star	28.02	2 February 2008
460	Rossacredibility	27.85	9 February 2008
655	Split the Pack	41.06	30 May 2004
845	Tipp the Breeze	55.30	10 November 2007
847	Bernis Emma	55.46	25 July 2004

=== Other uses ===
The stadium has also been used for football with Hull City A.F.C. using the ground at times for their home matches. The football team moved out after finding a new home at Boothferry Park in August 1947.

== Closure and demolition ==
In June 2009, it was announced that The Boulevard would close to greyhound racing once again after less than two years. After going to once-a-week racing, promoter Dave Marshall pulled the plug on funding for the loss-making stadium, with the last race being held on 17 June.

Following the prior demolition of the East Stand due to persistent vandalism, as well as the presence of asbestos, demolition of the rest of the stadium began in August 2010, after a Hull City Council inspection declared the stadium unsafe. The original foundation stones were removed for reuse in a memorial, while the goalposts were donated to amateur club West Hull A.R.L.F.C. A new free school, named The Boulevard Academy, was opened on the site in September 2013, and a memorial plaque to the stadium, as well as Hull F.C. fans who had ashes scattered at the stadium, was unveiled by the Lord Mayor of Hull on the school grounds in September 2015, during Hull F.C.'s 150th anniversary year.
