= 1979–80 Northern Rugby Football League season =

1979–80 Rugby Football League season
- League: Northern Rugby Football League
- Teams: First Division: 16; Second Division: 14

First Division
- Champions: Bradford Northern (1st title)
- Premiership: Widnes
- Man of Steel Award: (England) George Fairbairn
- Top point-scorer: (England) Steve Quinn (375)
- Top try-scorers: (England) Keith Fielding; (England) Steve Hubbard (30)

Promotion and relegation
- Promoted from Second Division: Featherstone Rovers; Halifax; Oldham; Barrow
- Relegated to Second Division: Wigan; Hunslet; York; Blackpool Borough

Second Division
- Winners: Featherstone Rovers
- Runners-up: Halifax

The 1979–80 Northern Rugby Football League season was the 85th season of rugby league football. Sixteen English clubs competed for the Northern Rugby Football League's First Division, with Bradford Northern claiming the title by for the first time.

== Season summary ==
- Bradford Northern won their first ever Championship this season. Wigan, Hunslet (having dropped the prefix of 'New' from New Hunslet), York and Blackpool Borough were relegated.
- Second Division Champions were Featherstone Rovers, Halifax, Oldham and Barrow were also promoted.
- Second place Widnes beat league champions Bradford Northern in the Premiership final.

== First Division ==
Pos	Team	Pld	W	D	L	PF	PA	PP	Pts	Qualification or relegation
1	Bradford Northern (C)	30	23	0	7	448	272	164.7	46	Qualification for Premiership first round
2	Widnes	30	22	1	7	546	293	186.3	45	Qualification for Premiership first round
3	Hull	30	18	3	9	454	326	139.3	39	Qualification for Premiership first round
4	Salford	30	19	1	10	495	374	132.4	39	Qualification for Premiership first round
5	Leeds	30	19	0	11	590	390	151.3	38	Qualification for Premiership first round
6	Leigh	30	16	1	13	451	354	127.4	33	Qualification for Premiership first round
7	Hull Kingston Rovers	30	16	1	13	539	445	121.1	33	Qualification for Premiership first round
8	St. Helens	30	15	2	13	505	410	123.2	32	Qualification for Premiership first round
9	Warrington	30	15	2	13	362	357	101.4	32	
10	Wakefield Trinity	30	14	2	14	435	466	93.3	30	
11	Castleford	30	13	2	15	466	475	98.1	28	
12	Workington Town	30	12	2	16	348	483	72.0	26	
13	Wigan (R)	30	9	3	18	366	523	70.0	21	Relegated to Second Dibision
14	Hunslet (R)	30	7	1	22	346	528	65.5	15	Relegated to Second Dibision
15	York (R)	30	6	1	23	375	647	58.0	13	Relegated to Second Dibision
16	Blackpool Borough (R)	30	5	0	25	230	613	37.5	10	Relegated to Second Dibision

Rules for classification: 1) Points; 2) Points scored percentage (points scored divided by points conceded)
(C) Champions; (R) Relegated

== Second Division ==
Pos	Team	Pld	W	D	L	PF	PA	PP	Pts	Promotion
1	Featherstone Rovers (C, P)	26	21	2	3	724	280	258.6	44	Promoted to First Division
2	Halifax (P)	26	19	3	4	463	213	217.4	41	Promoted to First Division
3	Oldham (P)	26	19	3	4	513	276	185.9	41	Promoted to First Division
4	Barrow (P)	26	18	1	7	582	280	207.9	37	Promoted to First Division
5	Whitehaven	26	15	1	10	397	276	143.8	31	
6	Dewsbury	26	13	2	11	408	343	119.0	28	
7	Rochdale Hornets	26	9	5	12	315	373	84.5	23	
8	Swinton	26	11	1	14	331	436	75.9	23	
9	Batley	26	10	2	14	232	370	62.7	22	
10	Bramley	26	10	1	15	330	451	73.2	21	
11	Keighley	26	10	0	16	342	396	86.4	20	
12	Huddersfield	26	10	0	16	363	423	85.8	20	
13	Huyton	26	5	0	21	209	555	37.7	10	
14	Doncaster	26	1	1	24	196	733	26.7	3	

Rules for classification: 1) Points; 2) Points scored percentage (points scored divided by points conceded)
(C) Champions; (P) Promoted

== Premiership ==
17 May 1980

Widnes (2)	19-5	Bradford Northern (1)
T-Wright, Aspey, Bentley, Elwell, Gorley; G-Burke; DG-Eckersley, Elwell		T-Redfearn; DG-Mumby

Station Road, Swinton
Attendance: 10,215

== Statistics ==
The following are the top points scorers in the 1979–80 season.

Most tries

Player	Team	Tries
Keith Fielding	Salford	30
Steve Hubbard	Hull Kingston Rovers	30
Geoff Munro	Oldham	29
Ian Ball	Barrow	27
Keith Bentley	Widnes	27
Peter Glynn	St. Helens	27
Roy Mathias	St. Helens	27
John Bevan	Warrington	26
David Redfearn	Bradford Northern	26
David Smith	Leeds	24

Most goals (including drop goals)

Player	Team	Goals
Steve Quinn	Featherstone Rovers	163
Steve Hubbard	Hull Kingston Rovers	138
Steve Rule	Salford	134
Steve Hesford	Warrington	128
Mick Burke	Widnes	127
Ian Ball	Barrow	119
Steve Diamond	Wakefield Trinity	116
Eric Fitzsimons	Oldham	108
Mick Parrish	Hunslet	98
Jimmy Birts	Halifax	97

== Sources ==
- 1979-80 Rugby Football League season at wigan.rlfans.com
- The Challenge Cup at The Rugby Football League website
