= 1966–67 Yorkshire Cup =

- Structure: Regional knockout championship
- Teams: 16
- Winners: Hull Kingston Rovers
- Runners-up: Featherstone Rovers

The 1966–67 Yorkshire Cup was the fifty-ninth occasion on which the Yorkshire Cup competition had been held.

Hull Kingston Rovers won the trophy by beating Featherstone Rovers by the score of 25–12.

The match was played at Headingley, Leeds, now in West Yorkshire. The attendance was 13,241 and receipts were £3,482

This was the first of two successive victories for Hull Kingston Rovers.

== Background ==
This season there were no junior/amateur clubs taking part, no new entrants and no "leavers" and so the total of entries remained the same at sixteen.

This in turn resulted in no byes in the first round.

== Competition and results ==
=== Round 1 ===
Involved 8 matches (with no byes) and 16 clubs

Game No	Fixture date	Home team	Score	Away team	Venue	Att	Rec	Notes	Ref
1	Fri 2 Sep 1966	Castleford	32–2	Batley	Wheldon Road				
2	Fri 2 Sep 1966	Hunslet	21–10	Doncaster	Parkside				
3	Sat 3 Sep 1966	Dwesbury	13–13	Wakefield Trinity	Crown Flatt				
4	Sat 3 Sep 1966	Featherstone Rovers	50–15	York	Post Office Road				
5	Sat 3 Sep 1966	Huddersfield	8–4	Bradford Northern	Fartown	9,990			
6	Sat 3 Sep 1966	Hull F.C.	20–24	Hull Kingston Rovers	Boulevard				
7	Sat 3 Sep 1966	Keighley	16–30	Halifax	Lawkholme Lane				
8	Sat 3 Sep 1966	Leeds	18–20	Bramley	Headingley				

=== Round 1 - replays ===
Involved 1 match and 2 clubs

Game No	Fixture date	Home team	Score	Away team	Venue	Att	Rec	Notes	Ref
R	Mon 5 Sep 1966	Wakefield Trinity	18–11	Dewsbury	Belle Vue				

=== Round 2 - quarterfinals ===
Involved 4 matches and 8 clubs

Game No	Fixture date	Home team	Score	Away team	Venue	Att	Rec	Notes	Ref
1	Mon 12 Sep 1966	Huddersfield	11–6	Wakefield Trinity	Fartown	7,473			
2	Tue 13 Sep 1966	Featherstone Rovers	17–9	Bramley	Post Office Road				
3	Wed 14 Sep 1966	Castleford	14–18	Halifax	Wheldon Road				
4	Wed 14 Sep 1966	Hunslet	3–29	Hull Kingston Rovers	Parkside				

=== Round 3 – semifinals ===
Involved 2 matches and 4 clubs

Game No	Fixture date	Home team	Score	Away team	Venue	Att	Rec	Notes	Ref
1	Mon 26 Sep 1966	Featherstone Rovers	20–9	Halifax	Post Office Road				
2	Mon 26 Sep 1966	Hull Kingston Rovers	27–7	Huddersfield	Craven Park (1)	10,533			

=== Final ===
Game No	Fixture date	Home team	Score	Away team	Venue	Att	Rec	Notes	Ref
	Saturday 15 October 1966	Hull Kingston Rovers	25–12	Featherstone Rovers	Headingley	13,241	£3,482	(Note: Headingley, Leeds, is the home ground of Leeds RLFC with a capacity of 21,000. The record attendance was 40,175 for a league match between Leeds and Bradford Northern on 21 May 1947.)	

==== Teams and scorers ====
Hull Kingston Rovers	№	Featherstone Rovers
	teams	
Cyril Kellett	1	Dave Kellett
Christopher Young	2	Vaughan Thomas
Alan Burwell	3	Ken Greatorex
Johnny Moore	4	Brian Wrigglesworth
Mike Blackmore	5	Graham Westwood
Roger Millward	6	Michael Smith
Arthur Bunting	7	Carl Dooler
Frank Fox	8	Malcolm Dixon
Peter Flanagan	9	Milan Kosanović
Brian Tyson	10	Colin Forsyth
William Holliday	11	Arnold Morgan
Frank Foster	12	Steve Lyons
Terry Major	13	Tommy Smales
Colin Hutton	Coach	Laurie Gant
25	score	12
17	HT	2
	Scorers	
	Tries	
Christopher Young (1)	T	Brian Wrigglesworth (1)
Alan Burwelll (1)	T	Colin Forsyth (1)
Johnny Moore (1)	T	
Mike Blackmoore (1)	T	
Peter Flanagan (1)	T	
	Goals	
Cyril Kellett (5)	G	Tommy Smales (3)
	G	
	Drop Goals	
	DG	
Referee		Brian Baker (Horwich)
White Rose Trophy for Man of the match		Cyril Kellett - Hull Kingston Rovers - Fullback
sponsored by		

Scoring - Try = three (3) points - Goal = two (2) points - Drop goal = two (2) points

=== The road to success ===
First round
Hunslet	21
Doncaster	10
Hull F.C.	20
Hull Kingston Rovers	24
Huddersfield	8
Bradford Northern	4
Dwesbury	13 (11_
Wakefield Trinity	13 (18)
Featherstone Rovers	50
York	15
Leeds	18
Bramley	20
Castleford	32
Batley	2
Keighley	16
Halifax	30

Second round
Hunslet	3
Hull Kingston Rovers	29
Huddersfield	11
Wakefield Trinity	6
Featherstone Rovers	17
Bramley	9
Castleford	14
Halifax	18

Semi-finals
Hull Kingston Rovers	27
Huddersfield	7
Featherstone Rovers	20
Halifax	9

Final
Hull Kingston Rovers	25
Featherstone Rovers	12

== See also ==
- 1966–67 Northern Rugby Football League season
- Rugby league county cups
