= Newlove =

Newlove may refer to:

== People ==
- Denise Newlove (born 1968), Scottish cricketer
- Garry Newlove (1959–2007), murder victim
- George Hillis Newlove (1893–1984), American accounting scholar
- Helen Newlove, Baroness Newlove (1961–2025), British community reform campaigner and life peer, widow of Garry Newlove
- John Newlove (poet) (1938–2003), Canadian poet
- John Newlove (born 1944), English rugby league footballer of the 1960s, 1970s, and 1980s (father of Paul Newlove and Richard Newlove)
- Paul Newlove (born 1971), English rugby league footballer of the 1980s, 1990s and 2000s (son of John Newlove)
- Richard Newlove, English rugby league footballer, son of John Newlove

== Other uses ==
- NewLove, a variant of the ILOVEYOU computer virus

== See also ==
- New Love (disambiguation)
