= Kellett (surname) =

Kellett is a surname. Notable people with the surname include:

- Al Kellett (1901–1960), relief pitcher in US Major League Baseball
- Bob Kellett (1927–2012), English film director, film producer and screenwriter
- Brian Kellett, rugby league footballer of the 1980s (son of Cyril Kellett)
- Cyril Kellett (1937–1993), English rugby league footballer of the 1950s, 1960s and 1970s (father of Brian Kellett)
- Dave Kellett, American cartoonist
- Edward Kellett (New Zealand politician) (1865–1922), New Zealand Member of Parliament for Dunedin North
- Edward Orlando Kellett (died 1943), British Member of Parliament and British Army officer
- Edward Kellett-Bowman (born 1931), British business and management consultant
- Dame Elaine Kellett-Bowman (1923–2014), British Conservative politician
- Gloria Calderon Kellett, American writer and actress
- Sir Henry Kellett (1806–1875), British naval officer and explorer
- James Kellett (born 1998), British racing driver
- Ken Kellett (born 1953), English rugby league footballer of the 1970s and 1980s
- Les Kellett (1915–2002), English professional wrestler
- Red Kellett (1909–1970), President and General Manager of the 'Baltimore Colts' American football team
- Ronald Gustave Kellett (1909–1998), Royal Air Force pilot in the Battle of Britain
