= Malcolm Dixon (rugby league) =

Former GB & England international rugby league footballer

Mal Dixon
Personal information
- Full name: Malcolm Dixon
- Born: 2 December 1939 (age 85); Lower Agbrigg, Wakefield, West Riding of Yorkshire, England

Playing information
- Height: 6 ft 2 in (1.88 m)
- Weight: 18 st 7 lb (117 kg)
- Position: Prop
Club
Years	Team	Pld	T	G	FG	P
1957–72	Featherstone Rovers	320	47	41	0	223
1972–74	York
1974–75	Featherstone Rovers
1975–≥75	York
	Total	320	47	41	0	223
Representative
Years	Team	Pld	T	G	FG	P
1960–74	Yorkshire	4	1	0	0	3
1962–64	Great Britain	2	1	0	0	3
1970	England	1	0	0	0	0

Coaching information
Club
Years	Team	Gms	W	D	L	W%
1975–≥78	York

Malcolm "Mal" Dixon (born 2 December 1939) is an English former professional rugby league footballer who played in the 1950s, 1960s and 1970s, and coached in the 1970s. He played at representative level for Great Britain, England and Yorkshire, and at club level for Featherstone Rovers (two spells) (captain and vice-captain) and York (two spells), as an occasional goal-kicking prop, and coached at club level for York.

== Background ==
Malcolm Dixon was born in Normanton, West Riding of Yorkshire, England, his birth was registered in Lower Agbrigg, Wakefield, West Riding of Yorkshire, England.

== Playing career ==
=== Club career ===
Mal Dixon made his début for Featherstone Rovers on Saturday 28 September 1957.

Mal Dixon played at prop in Featherstone Rovers' 15–14 victory over Hull F.C. in the 1959–60 Yorkshire Cup Final during the 1959–60 season at Headingley, Leeds on Saturday 31 October 1959, played at prop in the 0–10 defeat by Halifax in the 1963–64 Yorkshire Cup Final during the 1963–64 season at Belle Vue, Wakefield on Saturday 2 November 1963, and played at prop in the 12–25 defeat by Hull Kingston Rovers in the 1966–67 Yorkshire Cup Final during the 1966–67 season at Headingley, Leeds on Saturday 15 October 1966.

Mal Dixon played at prop in Featherstone Rovers' 17–12 victory over Barrow in the 1966–67 Challenge Cup Final during the 1966–67 season at Wembley Stadium, London on Saturday 13 May 1967, in front of a crowd of 76,290.

Mal Dixon's benefit season/testimonial match at Featherstone Rovers took place during the 1967–68 season.

=== Representative honours ===
Mal Dixon won a cap for England while at Featherstone Rovers in 1970 against Wales, and won caps for Great Britain while at Featherstone Rovers in 1962 against France, and in 1964 against France.

Mal Dixon won a cap for Yorkshire while at Featherstone Rovers; during the 1960–61 season against Cumberland.

Mal Dixon played in the combined Castleford and Featherstone Rovers teams' match against New Zealand at Wheldon Road, Castleford.

== Coaching career ==
=== County Cup Final appearances ===
Malcolm Dixon was the coach in York's 8–18 defeat by Bradford Northern in the 1978 Yorkshire Cup Final during the 1978–79 season at Headingley, Leeds on Saturday 28 October 1978, this was York's first major final since the 1957–58 Yorkshire Cup Final.

== Honoured at Featherstone Rovers ==
Malcolm Dixon is a Featherstone Rovers Hall of Fame inductee.
