= 1970–71 Yorkshire Cup =

- Structure: Regional knockout championship
- Teams: 16
- Winners: Leeds
- Runners-up: Featherstone Rovers

The 1970–71 Yorkshire Cup was the sixty-third occasion on which the Yorkshire Cup competition had been held.

Leeds won the trophy by beating Featherstone Rovers by the score of 23–7

The match was played at Odsal in the City of Bradford, now in West Yorkshire. The attendance was 6,753 and receipts were £1,879

This was Featherstone Rovers's second Yorkshire Cup final defeat in successive competitions

== Background ==
This season there were no junior/amateur clubs taking part, no new entrants and no "leavers" and so the total of entries remained the same at sixteen.

This in turn resulted in no byes in the first round.

== Competition and results ==
Involved 8 matches (with no byes) and 16 clubs

| Game No | Fixture date | Home team | Score | Away team | Venue | Att | Rec | Notes | Ref |
|---|---|---|---|---|---|---|---|---|---|
| 1 | Fri 28 Aug 1970 | Hull Kingston Rovers | 9–27 | Hull F.C. | Craven Park (1) | | | | |
| 2 | Sat 29 Aug 1970 | Bramley | 27–5 | Bradford Northern | McLaren Field | | | | |
| 3 | Sat 29 Aug 1970 | Castleford | 29–4 | Halifax | Wheldon Road | | | | |
| 4 | Sat 29 Aug 1970 | Featherstone Rovers | 40–9 | York | Post Office Road | | | | |
| 5 | Sat 29 Aug 1970 | Wakefield Trinity | 10–20 | Leeds | Belle Vue | | | | |
| 6 | Sun 30 Aug 1970 | Dewsbury | 12–10 | Keighley | Crown Flatt | | | | |
| 7 | Sun 30 Aug 1970 | Huddersfield | 17–0 | Batley | Fartown | | | | |
| 8 | Sun 30 Aug 1970 | Hunslet | w/o | Doncaster | Parkside | | | (Note: Just prior to the new season's start, the Hunslet players were told they had to accept a cut in wages. This they refused to accept as they had not had a rise for eight years. They went on strike. When the management threatened to close down the club, the players relented and backed down, but after only one match they went back on strike. This match was not played and Doncaster awarded a walk-over.) | |

=== Round 2 - Quarter-finals ===
Involved 4 matches and 8 clubs

| Game No | Fixture date | Home team | Score | Away team | Venue | Att | Rec | Notes | Ref |
|---|---|---|---|---|---|---|---|---|---|
| 1 | Mon 7 Sep 1970 | Castleford | 7–14 | Leeds | Wheldon Road | | | | |
| 2 | Fri 11 Sep 1970 | Bramley | 12–7 | Dewsbury | McLaren Field | | | | |
| 3 | Fri 11 Sep 1970 | Hull F.C. | 42–0 | Doncaster | Boulevard | | | | |
| 4 | Wed 16 Sep 1970 | Huddersfield | 8–10 | Featherstone Rovers | Fartown | | | | |

=== Round 3 – Semi-finals ===
Involved 2 matches and 4 clubs

| Game No | Fixture date | Home team | Score | Away team | Venue | Att | Rec | Notes | Ref |
|---|---|---|---|---|---|---|---|---|---|
| 1 | Tue 29 Sep 1970 | Hull F.C. | 11–12 | Leeds | Boulevard | | | | |
| 2 | Fri 2 Oct 1970 | Featherstone Rovers | 23–2 | Bramley | Post Office Road | | | | |

=== Final ===
| Game No | Fixture date | Home team | Score | Away team | Venue | Att | Rec | Notes | Ref |
|---|---|---|---|---|---|---|---|---|---|
| | Saturday 21 November 1970 | Leeds | 23–7 | Featherstone Rovers | Odsal | 6,753 | £1,879 | (Note: Odsal is the home ground of Bradford Northern from 1890 to 2010 and the current capacity is in the region of 26,000, The ground is famous for hosting the largest attendance at an English sports ground when 102,569 (it was reported that over 120,000 actually attended as several areas of boundary fencing collapse under the sheer weight of numbers) attended the replay of the Challenge Cup final on 5 May 1954 to see Halifax v Warrington) | |

==== Teams and scorers ====
| Leeds | No. | Featherstone Rovers |
|---|---|---|
| | teams | |
| John Holmes | 1 | Cyril Kellett |
| Alan Smith | 2 | Michael "Mick" Smith |
| Syd Hynes (c) | 3 | Keith Cotton |
| Ronnie Cowan | 4 | John Newlove |
| John Atkinson | 5 | David "Dave" Hartley |
| Anthony Wainwright | 6 | Chris Harding |
| Mick Shoebottom | 7 | Terry Hudson |
| John Burke | 8 | Sam Windmill |
| Peter Dunn | 9 | Dennis Morgan (Sent off) |
| Phil Cookson | 10 | Steve Lyons |
| Bill Ramsey | 11 | Alan Rhodes |
| Bob Haigh | 12 | James "Jimmy" Thompson |
| Ray Batten | 13 | Vince Farrar |
| John Langley (for Anthony Wainwright) | 14 | Paul Coventry (for Chris Harding) |
| ? | 15 | ? |
| Derek Turner | Coaches | Laurie Gant |
| 23 | score | 7 |
| 8 | HT | 2 |
| | Scorers | |
| | Tries | |
| Alan Smith (2) | T | Dave Hartley (1) |
| John Atkinson (1) | T | |
| Peter Dunn (1) | T | |
| Bill Ramsey (1) | T | |
| | T | |
| | T | |
| | T | |
| | Goals | |
| Syd Hynes (4) | G | Cyril Kellett (2) |
| | G | |
| | G | |
| | Drop Goals | |
| | DG | |
| | DG | |
| | DG | |
| Referee | | D S Brown (Preston) |
| White Rose Trophy for Man of the match | | Syd Hynes - Leeds - Centre |
| sponsored by | | |

Scoring - Try = three (3) points - Goal = two (2) points - Drop goal = two (2) points

=== The road to success ===
First round
Hull Kingston Rovers | 9
Hull F.C. | 27
Hunslet | w/o
Doncaster
Castleford | 29
Halifax | 4
Wakefield Trinity | 10
Leeds | 20
Huddersfield | 17
Huddersfield | 0
Featherstone Rovers | 40
York | 9
Bramley | 27
Bradford Northern | 5
Dewsbury | 12
Keighley | 10

Second round
Hull F.C. | 42
Doncaster | 0
Castleford | 7
Leeds | 14
Huddersfield | 8
Featherstone Rovers | 10
Bramley | 12
Dewsbury | 7

Semi-finals
Hull F.C. | 11
Leeds | 12
Featherstone Rovers | 23
Bramley | 2

Final
Leeds | 23
Featherstone Rovers | 7

== See also ==
- 1970–71 Northern Rugby Football League season
- Rugby league county cups
