= Les Tonks =

English rugby league footballer

Personal information
- Full name: Leslie Tonks
- Born: c. 1942; Pontefract district, England
- Died: 17 November 2017 (aged 75)

Playing information
- Height: 6 ft 3 in (1.91 m)
- Weight: 18 st 7 lb (117 kg)
- Position: Prop
Club
Years	Team	Pld	T	G	FG	P
1961–74	Featherstone Rovers	307	15	1	0	47
1970(Loan)	→ Hull Kingston Rovers	2
1974–76	Wakefield Trinity	55	1	0	0	6
	Total	364	16	1	0	53
Representative
Years	Team	Pld	T	G	FG	P
1965	Great Britain U-24	2	0	0	0	0

Leslie Tonks (c. 1942 – 17 November 2017) was an English professional rugby league footballer who played in the 1960s and 1970s. He played at club level for Featherstone Rovers, Hull Kingston Rovers and Wakefield Trinity, as a prop.

== Playing career ==
=== Featherstone Rovers ===
Tonks made his début for Featherstone Rovers on Saturday 9 September 1961.

Tonks played prop in Featherstone Rovers' 17-12 victory over Barrow in the 1966–67 Challenge Cup Final during the 1966–67 season at Wembley Stadium, London on Saturday 13 May 1967, in front of a crowd of 76,290. He also played prop in Featherstone Rovers' 9-12 defeat by Hull F.C. in the 1969–70 Yorkshire Cup Final during the 1969–70 season at Headingley Rugby Stadium, Leeds on Saturday 20 September 1969.

His son, Kevin Tonks, was also a prop for Featherstone Rovers during the 1980s.

=== Hull KR ===
Tonks spent the 1970/71 season on loan to Hull Kingston Rovers, playing in two matches.

=== Return to Featherstone ===
Tonks' benefit season and testimonial match at Featherstone Rovers took place during the 1972–73 season.

He played prop in the 33-14 victory over Bradford Northern in the 1972–73 Challenge Cup Final during the 1972–73 season at Wembley Stadium on Saturday 12 May 1973, in front of a crowd of 72,395, and also in the 9-24 defeat by Warrington in the 1973–74 Challenge Cup Final during the 1973–74 season at Wembley Stadium, London on Saturday 11 May 1974, in front of a crowd of 77,400, he is the only player to play in three Challenge Cup finals for Featherstone Rovers.

=== Wakefield Trinity ===
In September 1974, Tonks followed coach Peter Fox and joined Wakefield Trinity. He retired after the 1975/76 season.

=== Representative honours ===
On 3 April 1965, Tonks played in the first ever Great Britain under-24 international match in a 17–9 win against France under-24's.

== Honoured at Featherstone Rovers ==
Tonks is a Featherstone Rovers' Hall of Fame inductee.
