= Michael Smith (rugby league, born c. 1947) =

English rugby league footballer

Mike Smith
Personal information
- Full name: Michael Smith
- Born: c. 1947 Rossington, Doncaster, England

Playing information
- Position: Centre, Stand-off
Club
| Years | Team | Pld | T | G | FG | P |
|---|---|---|---|---|---|---|
| 1964–76 | Featherstone Rovers | 374 | 1436 | 1 | 0 | 344 |
| | Huddersfield |
| | Total | 374 | 1436 | 1 | 0 | 344 |
Representative
| Years | Team | Pld | T | G | FG | P |
| 1974 | Yorkshire | 2 | 1 | 0 | 0 | 3 |

Michael "Mick"/"Mike" Smith (born c. 1947) is an English former professional rugby league footballer who played in the 1960s and 1970s. He played at representative level for Yorkshire, and at club level for Featherstone Rovers, and Huddersfield, as a centre, or stand-off.

== Background ==
Michael Smith was born in Rossington, Doncaster, West Riding of Yorkshire, England.

== Playing career ==
=== County honours ===
Michael Smith won caps for Yorkshire while at Featherstone Rovers; during the 1974–75 season against Cumbria and Other Nationalities.

=== Challenge Cup Final appearances ===
Mick Smith played stand-off in Featherstone Rovers' 17-12 victory over Barrow in the 1966–67 Challenge Cup Final during the 1966–67 season at Wembley Stadium, London on Saturday 13 May 1967, in front of a crowd of 76,290, played at centre (replaced by substitute David "Dave" Hartley) in the 33-14 victory over Bradford Northern in the 1972–73 Challenge Cup Final during the 1972–73 season at Wembley Stadium, London on Saturday 12 May 1973, in front of a crowd of 72,395, and played at centre in the 9-24 defeat by Warrington in the 1973–74 Challenge Cup Final during the 1973–74 season at Wembley Stadium, London on Saturday 11 May 1974, in front of a crowd of 77,400.

=== County Cup Final appearances ===
Mick Smith played stand-off in Featherstone Rovers' 12-25 defeat by Hull Kingston Rovers in the 1966–67 Yorkshire Cup Final during the 1966–67 season at Headingley, Leeds on Saturday 15 October 1966, played at centre in the 9-12 defeat by Hull F.C. in the 1969–70 Yorkshire Cup Final during the 1969–70 season at Headingley, Leeds on Saturday 20 September 1969, and played on the wing in the 7-23 defeat by Leeds in the 1970–71 Yorkshire Cup Final during the 1970–71 season at Odsal Stadium, Bradford on Saturday 21 November 1970.

=== Club career ===
Mick Smith made his début for Featherstone Rovers on Saturday 31 October 1964, and he played his last match for Featherstone Rovers during the 1976–77 season.

=== Career records ===
The Featherstone Rovers most tries in a match record of six tries is jointly held by; Chris Bibb, Brad Dwyer, and Mike Smith, Smith scored six tries against Doncaster on Saturday 13 April 1968.

=== Testimonial match ===
Mick Smith's benefit season/testimonial match at Featherstone Rovers took place during the 1974–75 season.

== Coaching career ==
Mick Smith has coached Doncaster Toll Bar Under-16s.

== Honoured at Featherstone Rovers ==
Mick Smith is a Featherstone Rovers Hall of Fame inductee.
