= Steve Nash (rugby league) =

Former RL coach and GB & England international rugby league footballer

Personal information
- Born: 7 April 1949 (age 76) Featherstone, England

Playing information
- Position: Scrum-half
Club
Years	Team	Pld	T	G	FG	P
1967–75	Featherstone Rovers	201	52	70	2	298
1975–84	Salford	275	31	9	17	129
1985–88	Rochdale Hornets	28	0	0	0	0
	Total	504	83	79	19	427
Representative
Years	Team	Pld	T	G	FG	P
1971–81	Yorkshire	10	3	1	0	11
1975–81	England	7	1	0	0	3
1971–82	Great Britain	25	2	0	1	7

Coaching information
Club
Years	Team	Gms	W	D	L	W%
1988–89	Mansfield Marksman

Steve Nash (born 7 April 1949) is an English former professional rugby league footballer who played in the 1960s, 1970s and 1980s, and coached in the 1980s. A Great Britain and England national representative and scrum-half, he played his club rugby for Featherstone Rovers, winning a Challenge Cup title with them and being one of the inaugural inductees into the club's hall of fame. He also played for the Salford club and at representative level for Yorkshire. Nash later coached the Mansfield Marksman club for a season in 1989.

== Playing career ==
=== Featherstone Rovers ===
Born in Featherstone, Nash made his début for his hometown rugby league club Featherstone Rovers on 11 March 1967 against Halifax. He played as a stand-off during his first few games for the club, but later switched to scrum-half, deputising for first-choice Carl Dooler. When Dooler was transferred following a dispute with the club, Nash established himself a regular place in the first team.

During the 1969–70 Northern Rugby Football League season, he played scrum-half and scored a try in Featherstone Rovers' 9–12 loss against Hull in the 1969–70 Yorkshire Cup Final at Headingley, Leeds on Saturday 20 September 1969.

During the 1972–73 Northern Rugby Football League season, Nash played scrum-half and was voted man of the match, winning the Lance Todd Trophy in the 33–14 victory over Bradford Northern in the 1972–73 Challenge Cup Final at Wembley Stadium, London on Saturday 12 May 1973, in front of a crowd of 72,395. During the 1973–74 Northern Rugby Football League season, he played scrum-half in the 9–24 defeat by Warrington in the 1973–74 Challenge Cup Final at Wembley Stadium, London on Saturday 11 May 1974, in front of a crowd of 77,400.

=== Salford ===
In 1975 Nash moved to Salford, for a cash world-record £15,000. During the 1975–76 Northern Rugby Football League season, Nash played at Scrum-half in the Premiership Final loss against St Helens. He played scrum-half in Salford's 7–16 loss to Widnes in the 1975–76 Lancashire Cup Final at Central Park, Wigan on Saturday 4 October 1975.

In June 1978, he was named in the inaugural Open Rugby World XIII.

Nash was granted a Testimonial match at Salford, which took place in August 1984 against his former club Featherstone Rovers. Nash announced his retirement shortly afterwards, but was persuaded to resume playing a year later, and finished his career with Rochdale Hornets.

=== Representative career ===
In March 1971, while playing for Featherstone, Nash won his first cap for Great Britain against France. He was selected for the 1972 World Cup, and played in the final against Australia which was drawn 10–10, enabling Great Britain to claim the Cup. During the 1973 Kangaroo tour of Great Britain and France, Nash was selected to play for Great Britain at scrum half back in the first two Ashes Test matches against Australia.

Nash continued to play for Great Britain in 1974 against Australia (3 matches), and New Zealand (3 matches). Nash won caps for England while at Featherstone Rovers in the 1975 Rugby League World Cup against Wales, New Zealand, and Australia, and in 1975 against Papua New Guinea. Steve Nash won caps for Yorkshire while at Featherstone Rovers; during the 1971–72 season against Lancashire, during the 1972–73 season against Cumberland, and Lancashire, during the 1973–74 season against Cumbria, and Lancashire, and during the 1974–75 season against Cumbria.

He continued to represent Great Britain while at Salford, and narrowly missed out on a second World Cup victory in the 1977 Final which was lost to Australia 12–13.

In the first Test against Bob Fulton's Australia at Central Park, Wigan, in October 1978 Britain lost 15–9 and Nash and his opposite number, Tommy Raudonikis, were sent off for fighting early in the second half. During the 1978 Kangaroo tour of Great Britain and France, Nash continued to play at half back in all three Ashes Test matches. Nash continued to represent England in 1978 against France, and Wales, and in 1981 against Wales (2 matches). For the 1982 Kangaroo tour of Great Britain and France Nash was recalled to the Great Britain team as captain for the first Test against Australia at Hull in 1982. Australia won 40–4. Steve Nash also played scrum-half in Great Britain's 7–8 defeat by France in the friendly at Stadio Pier Luigi Penzo, Venice on Saturday 31 July 1982.

== Post-playing ==
In 1989 Nash coached the Mansfield Marksman. In 2016 he became one of the ten founding inductees into the Featherstone Rovers Hall of Fame.

== Honours ==
- Open Rugby World XIII: 1978, February 1979

Sporting positions
Preceded by	Coach Mansfield Marksman; 1988–1989	Succeeded by David Sampson; 1989-1993
