= Willis Fawley =

English rugby league footballer (1929–1981)

Personal information
- Full name: Willis Fawley
- Born: 22 November 1929; Pontefract district, England
- Died: 1981 (aged 51)

Playing information
- Position: Hooker
Club
Years	Team	Pld	T	G	FG	P
1951–67	Featherstone Rovers	369+2	59	9	0	195

Willis Fawley (22 November 1929 – 1981) was an English professional rugby league footballer who played in the 1960s and 1970s. He played at club level for Featherstone Rovers, as an occasional goal-kicking hooker.

== Background ==
Willis Fawley was born on 22 November 1929 in Pontefract district, West Riding of Yorkshire, England.

== Playing career ==
=== County Cup Final appearances ===
Willis Fawley played hooker in Featherstone Rovers' 15-14 victory over Hull F.C. in the 1959–60 Yorkshire Cup Final during the 1959–60 season at Headingley, Leeds on Saturday 31 October 1959, and played hooker in the 0-10 defeat by Halifax in the 1963–64 Yorkshire Cup Final during the 1963–64 season at Belle Vue, Wakefield on Saturday 2 November 1963.

=== Club career ===
Willis Fawley made his début for Featherstone Rovers on Saturday 10 March 1951.

=== Testimonial match ===
Willis Fawley's benefit season/testimonial match at Featherstone Rovers took place during the 1960–61 season.

== Honoured at Featherstone Rovers ==
Willis Fawley is a Featherstone Rovers Hall of Fame inductee.

== Personal life and death ==
Willis Fawley's marriage to Valerie (née Pearson) was registered during first ¼ 1962 in Pontefract district.

Fawley died in 1981, at the age of 51.
