= Cyril Woolford =

English rugby league footballer (1927–2018)

Personal information
- Born: c. 1927; Tadcaster, England
- Died: 30 November 2018 (aged 91); Pontefract, England

Playing information
- Position: Wing, Centre
Club
| Years | Team | Pld | T | G | FG | P |
|---|---|---|---|---|---|---|
| 1949–54 | Castleford | 67 | 14 | 0 | 0 | 42 |
| 1954–56 | Doncaster | 60 | 12 | 0 | 0 | 36 |
| 1956–61 | Featherstone Rovers | 185 | 88 | 0 | 0 | 264 |
| | Total | 312 | 114 | 0 | 0 | 342 |
Representative
| Years | Team | Pld | T | G | FG | P |
| 1957–59 | Yorkshire | 2 | 1 | 0 | 0 | 3 |

Cyril Woolford (c. 1927 – 30 November 2018) was an English professional rugby league footballer who played in the 1940s, 1950s and 1960s. He played at representative level for Yorkshire, and at club level for Castleford, Doncaster, and Featherstone Rovers (vice-captain), as a wing, or centre, he was a committee member at Featherstone Rovers for a number of years.

== Background ==
Cyril Woolford's birth was registered in Tadcaster, West Riding of Yorkshire, England, he lived in the Featherstone area, he was a domestic appliance technician.

== Playing career ==
=== County honours ===
Cyril Woolford won caps for Yorkshire while at Featherstone Rovers; he played at centre in the 25-11 victory over Lancashire in the 1957–58 County Championship during the 1957–58 season at Naughton Park, Widnes on Monday 23 September 1957, and played on the wing and scored a try in the 38-28 victory over Lancashire in the 1959–60 County Championship during the 1959–60 season at Hilton Park, Leigh on Wednesday 11 November 1959.

=== County Cup Final appearances ===
Cyril Woolford played on the wing scored a try, and was vice-captain in Featherstone Rovers' 15-14 victory over Hull F.C. in the 1959–60 Yorkshire Cup Final during the 1959–60 season at Headingley, Leeds on Saturday 31 October 1959.

=== Club career ===
Cyril Woolford made his début for Featherstone Rovers on Saturday 7 April 1956, he broke Eric Batten's "most tries in a season" record for Featherstone Rovers, by scoring 31-tries during the 1959–60 season, this record was later extended to 48-tries by Paul Newlove during the 1992–93 season (albeit at Second Division level), and he played his last match for Featherstone Rovers during the 1960–61 season.

== Honoured at Featherstone Rovers ==
Cyril Woolford is a Featherstone Rovers Hall of Fame inductee.

== Personal life ==
Woolford was the father of the rugby league wing who played for Featherstone Rovers; Neil Woolford, and was the grandfather of the association footballer; Martyn Woolford.
