= Jack Fennell =

English rugby league footballer (1933–2019)

Personal information
- Full name: Jack Fennell
- Born: 6 May 1933; Pontefract, England
- Died: 3 January 2019 (aged 85)

Playing information
- Position: Fullback, Wing, Centre, Stand-off
Club
Years	Team	Pld	T	G	FG	P
1952–65	Featherstone Rovers	319+3	30	455	0	1000
- Relatives: Dale Fennell (son)

Jack "Jackie" Fennell (6 May 1933 – 3 January 2019) was an English professional rugby league footballer who played in the 1950s and 1960s. He played at representative level for Yorkshire Schoolboys rugby league team, Yorkshire Schoolboys (versus Lancashire Schoolboys rugby league team, Lancashire Schoolboys on Saturday 24 April 1948), and at club level for Bagley's Recs (a pressed glass factory in Knottingley) and Featherstone Rovers as a goal-kicking fullback, wing, centre or stand-off.

== Background ==
Jackie Fennell was born in Pontefract, West Riding of Yorkshire, England. He died aged 85 and his funeral took place at Pontefract Crematorium, Wakefield Road, Pontefract on Monday 28 January 2019, followed by a reception at Featherstone Rovers RLFC.

== Playing career ==
=== County Cup Final appearances ===
Jackie Fennell played fullback in Featherstone Rovers' 15–14 victory over Hull F.C. in the 1959–60 Yorkshire Cup Final during the 1959–60 season at Headingley, Leeds on Saturday 31 October 1959, and played fullback in the 0–10 defeat by Halifax in the 1963–64 Yorkshire Cup Final during the 1963–64 season at Belle Vue, Wakefield on Saturday 2 November 1963.

=== Club career ===
Jackie Fennell signed for Featherstone Rovers during December 1952, and made his début on Saturday 20 December 1952, he played in the Challenge Cup semi-final three times, losing on each occasion; the 1957–58 Challenge Cup during the 1957–58 season, 1959–60 Challenge Cup during the 1959–60 season, and the 1961–62 Challenge Cup during the 1961–62 season, he played his last match for Featherstone Rovers against Batley during April 1965.

=== Testimonial match ===
Jackie Fennell's benefit season/testimonial match at Featherstone Rovers took place during the 1962–63 season, including the match against Huddersfield at Post Office Road, Featherstone on Saturday 25 May 1963.

== Honours ==
Featherstone Rovers

- Yorkshire Cup: 1959–60

== Honoured at Featherstone Rovers ==
Jackie Fennell is a Featherstone Rovers Hall of Fame inductee.

== Genealogical information ==
Jackie Fennell's marriage to Priscilla J. (née Bannister) was registered during second ¼ 1954 in Pontefract district. They had children; the future rugby league footballer; Dale Fennell.
