= 1969–70 Yorkshire Cup =

- Structure: Regional knockout championship
- Teams: 16
- Winners: Hull F.C.
- Runners-up: Featherstone Rovers

The 1969–70 Yorkshire Cup was the sixty-second occasion on which the Yorkshire Cup competition was held.

Hull F.C. won the trophy by beating Featherstone Rovers by a score of 12–9.

The match was played at Headingley, Leeds, now in West Yorkshire. The attendance was 11,089 and receipts were £3,419.

This was only Hull FC's second Yorkshire Cup win (the previous being in 1923) in thirteen final appearances, and in many quarters the club had been classed as "the bridesmaid but never the bride". It was also Featherstone Rovers's first of two successive final defeats.

This was the last Yorkshire Cup final for nine years in which the attendance would reach 10,000.

== Background ==
This season there were no junior/amateur clubs taking part, no new entrants and no "leavers", so the total of entries remained the same, at sixteen.

This in turn resulted in no byes in the first round.

== Competition and results ==
=== Round 1 ===
Round 1 involved eight matches (with no byes) and 16 clubs.

Game no.	Fixture date	Home team	Score	Away team	Venue	Att	Rec	Notes	Ref
1	Sun 3 Aug 1969	Dewsbury	8–19	Huddersfield	Crown Flatt	2,000			
2	Wed 6 Aug 1969	Bramley	2–6	Batley	McLaren Field				
3	Thu 7 Aug 1969	Halifax	27–15	Wakefield Trinity	Thrum Hall				
4	Fri 8 Aug 1969	Leeds	20–6	Bradford Northern	Headingley				
5	Fri 8 Aug 1969	York	20–7	Hunslet	Clarence Street				
6	Sat 9 Aug 1969	Hull F.C.	30–4	Castleford	Boulevard				
7	Sat 9 Aug 1969	Keighley	4–16	Hull Kingston Rovers	Lawkholme Lane				
8	Sun 10 Aug 1969	Doncaster	18–20	Featherstone Rovers	Bentley Road Stadium/Tattersfield				

=== Round 2 – quarterfinals ===
Round 2's quarterfinals involved four matches and eight clubs.

Game no.	Fixture date	Home team	Score	Away team	Venue	Att	Rec	Notes	Ref
1	Fri 15 Aug 1969	Leeds	44–6	Halifax	Headingley				
2	Sat 16 Aug 1969	Batley	20–30	Hull Kingston Rovers	Mount Pleasant				
3	Sat 16 Aug 1969	Featherstone Rovers	24–7	Huddersfield	Post Office Road	3,446			
4	Sat 16 Aug 1969	York	15–22	Hull F.C.	Clarence Street				

=== Round 3 – semifinals ===
Round 3's semifinals involved two matches and four clubs.

Game no.	Fixture date	Home team	Score	Away team	Venue	Att	Rec	Notes	Ref
1	Thu 28 Aug 1969	Featherstone Rovers	10–9	Hull Kingston Rovers	Post Office Road				
2	Sat 30 Aug 1969	Leeds	17–20	Hull F.C.	Headingley				

=== Final ===
Game no.	Fixture date	Home team	Score	Away team	Venue	Att	Rec	Notes	Ref
	Saturday 20 September 1969	Hull F.C.	12–9	Featherstone Rovers	Headingley	11,089	£3,419	(Note: Headingley, Leeds, is the home ground of Leeds RLFC, with a capacity of 21,000. The record attendance was 40,175 for a league match between Leeds and Bradford Northern on 21 May 1947.)	

==== Teams and scorers ====
Hull	№	Featherstone Rovers
	Teams	
Martin Owbridge	1	Cyril Kellett
Clive Sullivan	2	John Newlove
Dick Gemmell (c)	3	Gary Jordan
John Maloney	4	Michael "Mick" Smith
Alf Macklin	5	David "Dave" Hartley
Brian Hancock	6	David Kellett
Chris Davidson	7	Steve Nash
Mick Harrison	8	Les Tonks
Alan McGlone	9	Vince Farrar
Jim Macklin	10	Steve Lyons
Thomas "Tom" Kirchin	11	Arnold Morgan
Chris Forster	12	James "Jimmy" Thompson
Joe Brown	13	Tommy Smales
??	14	Terry Hudson (for Dave Hartley)
??	15	??
Johnny Whiteley	Coach	Laurie Gant
12	Score	9
2	HT	4
	Scorers	
	Tries	
Clive Sullivan (1)	T	Steve Nash (1)
Jim Macklin (1)	T	
	Goals	
John Maloney (2)	G	Cyril Kellett (3)
Joe Brown (1)	G	
Referee		Richard Llewellyn "Dickie" /"Dicky" Thomas (Oldham)
White Rose Trophy for Man of the match		Joe Brown - Hull - loose forward
sponsored by		

Scoring - Try = three (3) points - Goal = two (2) points - Drop goal = two (2) points

=== The road to success ===
First round
Leeds	20
Bradford Northern	6
Halifax	27
Wakefield Trinity	15
York	20
Hunslet	7
Hull F.C.	30
Castleford	4
Doncaster	18
Featherstone Rovers	20
Dewsbury	8
Huddersfield	19
Bramley	2
Batley	6
Keighley	4
Hull Kingston Rovers	16

Second round
Leeds	44
Halifax	6
York	15
Hull F.C.	22
Featherstone Rovers	24
Huddersfield	7
Batley	20
Hull Kingston Rovers	30

Semi-finals
Leeds	17
Hull F.C.	20
Featherstone Rovers	10
Hull Kingston Rovers	9

Final
Hull F.C.	12
Featherstone Rovers	9

== See also ==
- 1969–70 Northern Rugby Football League season
- Rugby league county cups
