= John Newlove =

John Newlove may refer to:

- John Newlove (poet) (1938–2003), Canadian poet
- John Newlove (rugby league) (born 1944), English rugby league footballer
