= Arnie Morgan =

GB & England international rugby league footballer

Personal information
- Full name: Arnold Morgan
- Born: 19 September 1942 Pontefract, England
- Died: 14 December 2025 (aged 83)

Playing information
- Height: 5 ft 11 in (1.80 m)
- Weight: 16 st 10 lb (106 kg)
- Position: Prop, Second-row
Club
Years	Team	Pld	T	G	FG	P
1962–72	Featherstone Rovers	245	49	21	0	189
1972–≥72	York
	Total	245	49	21	0	189
Representative
Years	Team	Pld	T	G	FG	P
1967–69	Yorkshire	4	0	0	0	0
1968	England	1	0	0	0	0
1968	Great Britain	4	1	0	0	3

Arnold "Arnie" Morgan (19 September 1942 - 14 December 2025) is an English former professional rugby league footballer who played in the 1960s and 1970s. He played at representative level for Great Britain, England and Yorkshire, and at club level for Featherstone Rovers and York, as an occasional goal-kicking prop or second-row.

== Background ==
Arnie Morgan was born in Pontefract, West Riding of Yorkshire, England, he worked a refuse collector c. 1967.

== Playing career ==
=== Club career ===
Morgan made his début for Featherstone Rovers on Saturday 17 February 1962.

Morgan played at second-row, and scored a try in Featherstone Rovers' 17-12 victory over Barrow in the 1966–67 Challenge Cup Final during the 1966–67 season at Wembley Stadium, London on Saturday 13 May 1967, in front of a crowd of 76,290.

Morgan played at second-row in Featherstone Rovers' 12-25 defeat by Hull Kingston Rovers in the 1966–67 Yorkshire Cup Final during the 1966–67 season at Headingley, Leeds on Saturday 15 October 1966, and played at second-row in the 9-12 defeat by Hull F.C. in the 1969–70 Yorkshire Cup Final during the 1969–70 season at Headingley, Leeds on Saturday 20 September 1969.

Morgan's benefit season/testimonial match at Featherstone Rovers took place during the 1971–72 season.

=== Representative honours ===
Morgan, won a cap for England while at Featherstone Rovers in 1968 against Wales, and won caps for Great Britain while at Featherstone Rovers in 1968 against France (2 matches), and in the 1968 Rugby League World Cup against France, and New Zealand.

Morgan won caps for Yorkshire while at Featherstone Rovers; during the 1967–68 season as an interchange/substitute against Australia, during the 1968–69 season against Cumberland and Lancashire, and during the 1969–70 season as an interchange/substitute against Lancashire.

== Honoured at Featherstone Rovers ==
Arnie Morgan is a Featherstone Rovers Hall of Fame inductee.

He died on 14 December 2025, aged 83
