= Charlie Stone (rugby league) =

England international rugby league footballer (1950–2018)

Personal information
- Full name: Richard Stone
- Born: 12 September 1950 Pontefract, England
- Died: 1 May 2018 (aged 67)

Playing information

Rugby union
Club
Years	Team	Pld	T	G	FG	P
19??–??	Pontefract RUFC

Rugby league
- Position: Prop, Second-row
Club
Years	Team	Pld	T	G	FG	P
1970–78	Featherstone Rovers	241	25	0	0	75
1978–85	Hull F.C.	188	8	0	0	24
1985–86	Featherstone Rovers	21	1	0	0	4
	Total	450	34	0	0	103
Representative
Years	Team	Pld	T	G	FG	P
1973	Yorkshire	2	0	0	0	0
1975	England	1	0	0	0	0
- Relatives: Paul Newlove (nephew); Richard Newlove (nephew); John Newlove (brother-in-law)

Richard Stone (12 September 1950 – 1 May 2018), known as Charlie Stone, was an English rugby union and professional rugby league footballer who played in the 1970s and 1980s. He played club level rugby union (RU) for Pontefract RUFC and representative level rugby league (RL) for England and Yorkshire, and at club level for Featherstone Rovers and Hull F.C., as a prop or second-row and was captain of Hull during the 1980–81 season.

== Background ==
Charlie Stone's was born in Pontefract, West Yorkshire on 12 September 1950, and he died aged 67.

== Playing career ==
=== Featherstone Rovers ===
Charlie Stone made his début for Featherstone Rovers on Wednesday 14 October 1970, in an 8-year career with the club he made 241 appearances and scored 25 tries playing mostly as a second-row or loose forward.

Notable matches in which he played include two consecutive Challenge Cup finals in 1973 and 1974. In the first he played loose forward in Featherstone Rovers' 33–14 victory over Bradford Northern in the 1973 Challenge Cup Final at Wembley Stadium, London on Saturday 12 May 1973, in front of a crowd of 72,395. In the 1974 final he was a substitute (replacing second-row Jimmy Thompson) in the 9–24 defeat by Warrington Wembley Stadium on Saturday 11 May 1974, in front of a crowd of 77,400.

Two County Cup Final appearances followed, playing at second-row in Featherstone Rovers' 12–16 defeat by Leeds in the 1976 Yorkshire Cup Final at Headingley, Leeds on Saturday 16 October 1976, and playing at second-row (replaced by substitute Peter Smith) in the 7–17 defeat by Castleford in the 1977 Yorkshire Cup Final at Headingley on Saturday 15 October 1977.

=== Hull F.C. ===
In 1978 Stone joined Hull F.C. and went on to make 188 appearances and scoring 8 tries during 5 years at the club. At Hull he moved into the front row of the pack and mostly played at prop.

The first honours while at Hull were in the 13–3 victory over Hull Kingston Rovers in the 1979 BBC2 Floodlit Trophy Final at The Boulevard, Kingston upon Hull on Tuesday 18 December 1979. With Hull he made a further three Challenge Cup Final appearances; playing at prop in Hull F.C.'s 5–10 defeat by Hull Kingston Rovers in the 1980 Challenge Cup Final at Wembley on Saturday 3 May 1980, in front of a crowd of 95,000, and two years later played at prop in the 14–14 draw with Widnes in the 1982 Final at Wembley on Saturday 1 May 1982, in front of a crowd of 92,147, and played at prop in the 18–9 victory over Widnes in the replay at Elland Road, Leeds on Wednesday 19 May 1982, in front of a crowd of 41,171. Finally in 1983 he played at prop in Hull's 14–12 defeat by Featherstone Rovers at Wembley in front of a crowd of 84,869

In between the two Challenge Cup finals he played at prop in a 12–4 victory over Hull Kingston Rovers in the 1981–82 John Player Trophy Final Headingley on Saturday 23 January 1982. Stone captained the team on that day and was sent off 5 minutes from the end along with Roy Holdstock from the opposition. In a controversial moment Stone was allowed up to lift the trophy, despite the early exit from the game. In 1982 he played at prop in the 18–7 victory over Bradford Northern in the 1982 Yorkshire Cup Final at Elland Road on Saturday 2 October 1982.

=== Featherstone Rovers, second spell ===
At the end of the 1984/85 season Stone rejoined Featherstone for a second time during which he played a further 21 games, scoring one try before retiring. Stone was inducted into Featherstone Rovers Hall of Fame in 2016.

=== Representative honours ===
Charlie Stone won caps for Yorkshire while at Featherstone Rovers; during the 1973–74 season against Cumbria and Lancashire.

Stone won a cap for England as a substitute while at Featherstone Rovers in 1975 against Australia. Stone was selected for the 1979 Great Britain Lions tour to Australasia, and while he played in 12 tour matches he was not selected for any of the test matches.
