= Paul Coventry =

English rugby league footballer and RL administrator

Personal information
- Full name: Paul P. Coventry
- Born: 5 December 1952 (age 73) Pontefract, England

Playing information
- Position: Wing, Centre, Stand-off
Club
Years	Team	Pld	T	G	FG	P
1970–82	Featherstone Rovers	286+15	86	0	0	258
1982–85	Wakefield Trinity	53	9	0	0	31
	Total	354	95	0	0	289

Paul P. Coventry (5 December 1952) is an English former professional rugby league footballer who played in the 1970s and 1980s. He played at club level for Fryston A.R.L.F.C., Featherstone Rovers, and Wakefield Trinity, as a wing, centre, or stand-off, he was previously the chairman of Featherstone Rovers, and as of 2013 is the stadium co-ordinator at Post Office Road, Featherstone.

== Background ==
Paul Coventry was born in Pontefract, West Riding of Yorkshire, England.

== Playing career ==
=== Challenge Cup Final appearances ===
Paul Coventry played on the wing in Featherstone Rovers' 33–14 victory over Bradford Northern in the 1973 Challenge Cup Final during the 1972–73 season at Wembley Stadium, London on Saturday 12 May 1973, in front of a crowd of 72,395, a broken arm meant he didn't play in the 9–24 defeat by Warrington in the 1974 Challenge Cup Final.

=== County Cup Final appearances ===
Paul Coventry played as a substitute (replacing stand-off Chris Harding) in Featherstone Rovers' 7–23 defeat by Leeds in the 1970 Yorkshire Cup Final during the 1970–71 season, at Odsal Stadium, Bradford on Saturday 21 November 1970, and played at centre in the 12–16 defeat by Leeds in the 1976 Yorkshire Cup Final during the 1976–77 season, at Headingley, Leeds on Saturday 16 October 1976.

=== Club career ===
Paul Coventry made his début for the Featherstone Rovers on Saturday 19 September 1970, during his time at Wakefield Trinity he scored five 3-point tries, and four 4-point tries.

=== Testimonial match ===
Paul Coventry's benefit season/testimonial match at Featherstone Rovers took place during the 1981–82 season.

== Honoured at Featherstone Rovers ==
Paul Coventry is a Featherstone Rovers Hall of Fame Inductee.
