= David Hartley (rugby league) =

English rugby league footballer

Personal information
- Full name: David Hartley
- Born: 6 April 1946
- Died: 16 January 2014 (aged 67)

Playing information
- Position: Wing, Centre
Club
Years	Team	Pld	T	G	FG	P
1966–76	Featherstone Rovers	280+22	116	0	0	348
1976–76	Rochdale Hornets
	Total	302	116	0	0	348
Representative
Years	Team	Pld	T	G	FG	P
1974	Yorkshire	1	0	0	0	0

David Hartley (birth unknown – 16 January 2014) was an English professional rugby league footballer who played in the 1960s and 1970s. He played at representative level for Yorkshire, and at club level for Normanton ARLFC, Leeds (A-Team), Featherstone Rovers, and Rochdale Hornets, as a wing or centre.

== Background ==
David Hartley's funeral service took place at Pontefract Crematorium, Wakefield Road, Pontefract at 3.20pm on Monday 27 January 2014.

== Playing career ==
=== County honours ===
David Hartley won a cap for Yorkshire while at Featherstone Rovers; during the 1974–75 season against Cumbria

=== Challenge Cup Final appearances ===
David Hartley was an unused substitute in Featherstone Rovers' 17-12 victory over Barrow in the 1966–67 Challenge Cup Final during the 1966–67 season at Wembley Stadium, London on Saturday 13 May 1967, in front of a crowd of 76,290, appeared as a substitute (replacing centre Michael Smith) and scored a try, becoming the first interchange/substitute to score in the Challenge Cup Final, in the 33-14 victory over Bradford Northern in the 1972–73 Challenge Cup Final during the 1972–73 season at Wembley Stadium, London on Saturday 12 May 1973, in front of a crowd of 72,395, and played at centre in the 9-24 defeat by Warrington in the 1973–74 Challenge Cup Final during the 1973–74 season at Wembley Stadium, London on Saturday 11 May 1974, in front of a crowd of 77,400.

=== County Cup Final appearances ===
David Hartley played on the wing (replaced by substitute Terry Hudson) in Featherstone Rovers' 9-12 defeat by Hull F.C. in the 1969–70 Yorkshire Cup Final during the 1969–70 season at Headingley, Leeds on Saturday 20 September 1969, and played on the wing, and scored a try in the 7-23 defeat by Leeds in the 1970–71 Yorkshire Cup Final during the 1970–71 season at Odsal Stadium, Bradford on Saturday 21 November 1970.

== Club career ==
David Hartley made his début for Featherstone Rovers on Saturday 29 January 1966, and he played his last match for Featherstone Rovers during the 1975–76 season.
