= Steve Lyons =

Steve Lyons may refer to:

- Steve Lyons (writer), British writer
- Steve Lyons (baseball) (born 1960), baseball player and baseball announcer/analyst
- Steve Lyons (rugby league), rugby league footballer of the 1970s, and 1980s

== See also ==
- Steve Lyon (born 1952), ice hockey player
