= Dennis Trotter =

English rugby league footballer

Personal information
- Full name: Dennis Trotter
- Born: 1 January 1950 Thornhill, Dewsbury, West Riding of Yorkshire, England
- Died: 2 August 2003 (aged 53) Thornhill, Dewsbury, West Riding of Yorkshire, England

Playing information
- Position: Second-row
Club
Years	Team	Pld	T	G	FG	P
1970–82	Bradford Northern	201	27	0	0	81

Dennis Trotter (1 January 1950 – 2 August 2003) was an English professional rugby league footballer who played in the 1970s and 1980s. He played at club level for Bradford Northern, as a second-row.

== Early life ==
Trotter was born in 1950 in Thornhill, a village situated in Dewsbury, West Riding of Yorkshire, England. Dennis was more interested in association football than rugby league growing up and played for the local team Dewsbury Town FC in the 1967/68 season. However friends persuaded Trotter to follow rugby and he supported Wakefield Trinity. Along with his brother Geoff, Dennis played rugby for the bus company amateur team.

== Playing career ==
=== Bradford Northern ===
At the age of 20, Trotter signed with Championship side Bradford Northern. Trotter was started at second-row in Northern's 18–8 victory over York in the 1978 Yorkshire Cup Final during the 1978–79 season at Headingley, Leeds on Saturday 28 October 1978.

He also helped Northern get to the final of the 1972–73 Challenge Cup however he missed the 33–14 loss in the final to Featherstone Rovers. Dennis also featured in Bradford's RFL Premiership winning side in the 1977–78 season, and also featured in the back to back RFL Championship winning sides of the 1979–80 season, and the 1980–81 season. Trotter was awarded a testimonial year in 1980/81.

== Post-playing career ==
During his time as a rugby player, he also worked as a milkman in Chickenley and later moved to the managerial side at Associated Dairies. After retiring from playing rugby he had a spell coaching at Dewsbury Celtic but spent most of his time looking after pubs and clubs in the area including; Dewsbury Irish National League Club (known locally as Dewsbury Nash), and Hanging Heaton cricket club (in a relief capacity).

In 1989, Trotter met his wife Joy whilst managing a bar in Halifax, West Yorkshire, England. In 2003 he was diagnosed with cancer, and died later that year on 2 August in hospital. His funeral was held at Thornhill Parish Church and his ashes were scattered at Odsal Stadium.
