= Colin Forsyth =

England international rugby league footballer

Personal information
- Born: c. 1947; York, England
- Died: 31 May 2018 (aged 70–71)

Playing information
- Position: Prop
Club
Years	Team	Pld	T	G	FG	P
1964–65	Oldham	1
1966–68	Featherstone Rovers	28	4	0	0	12
1968–74	York
1974–80	Bradford Northern	155	56	0	0	168
1980–82	Wakefield Trinity
	Total	184	60	0	0	180
Representative
Years	Team	Pld	T	G	FG	P
1975	England	3	1	0	0	3

Colin Forsyth (c. 1947 – 31 May 2018) was an English professional rugby league footballer who played in the 1960s, 1970s and 1980s. He played at representative level for England, and at club level for Heworth A.R.L.F.C., Oldham, Featherstone Rovers, Bradford Northern and Wakefield Trinity, as a prop.

== Playing career ==
=== Featherstone Rovers ===
Forsyth made his début for Featherstone Rovers on Friday 22 April 1966.

Forsyth played at prop in Featherstone Rovers' 12-25 defeat by Hull Kingston Rovers in the 1966–67 Yorkshire Cup Final during the 1966–67 season at Headingley, Leeds on Saturday 15 October 1966.

Forsyth was a reserve to travel in Featherstone Rovers' 17-12 victory over Barrow in the 1966–67 Challenge Cup Final during the 1966–67 season at Wembley Stadium, London on Saturday 13 May 1967, in front of a crowd of 76,290.

=== Bradford Northern ===
Forsyth joined Bradford Northern in 1974, but broke his arm in the 1974–75 season.

He played in Bradford Northern's 17-8 victory over Widnes in the Premiership Final during the 1977–78 season, the 2-24 defeat by Leeds in the Premiership Final during the 1978–79 season, and the 5-19 defeat by Widnes in the Premiership Final during the 1979–80 season.

He played at prop (replaced by substitute Graham Joyce) in Bradford Northern's 18-8 victory over York in the 1978–79 Yorkshire Cup Final during the 1978–79 season at Headingley, Leeds on Saturday 28 October 1978.

He played at prop in Bradford Northern's 6-0 victory over Widnes in the 1979–80 John Player Trophy Final during the 1979–80 season at Headingley, Leeds on Saturday 5 January 1980.

Forsyth played in Bradford Northern's victory in the Championship during the 1979–80 season. In July 1980, he was sold to Wakefield Trinity as part of an exchange deal for Graham Idle.

=== International honours ===
Colin Forsyth won caps for England while at Bradford Northern in the 1975 Rugby League World Cup against France, New Zealand, and Wales.

== Personal life and death ==
Colin Forsyth is the father of the rugby league prop who played in the 2000s for York Wasps, Doncaster and York City Knights; Craig Forsyth.
