= Graham Harris (rugby league) =

English rugby league footballer

Personal information
- Full name: Graham Harris
- Born: late 1946 (age 79–80) Pontefract district, England

Playing information
- Position: Hooker
Club
Years	Team	Pld	T	G	FG	P
1966–69	Featherstone Rovers	61+2	9	6	0	39
- Relatives: Billy Harris (brother)

Graham Harris (fourth ¼ 1946) is an English professional rugby league footballer who played in the 1960s. He played at club level for Featherstone Rovers, as an occasional goal-kicking hooker.

== Background ==
Graham Harris' birth was registered in Pontefract district, West Riding of Yorkshire, England.

== Playing career ==
Harris made his début for Featherstone Rovers on Saturday 17 December 1966.

=== Challenge Cup Final appearances ===
Harris played hooker in Featherstone Rovers' 17-12 victory over Barrow in the 1966–67 Challenge Cup Final during the 1966–67 season at Wembley Stadium, London on Saturday 13 May 1967, in front of a crowd of 76,290.

== Genealogical information ==
Graham Harris is the older brother of the rugby league footballer Billy Harris.
