= Ken Greatorex =

English rugby league footballer (1936–2025)

Personal information
- Full name: Kenneth Greatorex
- Born: 16 August 1936 Wakefield district, England
- Died: 12 December 2025 (aged 89)

Playing information
- Position: Wing, Centre
Club
Years	Team	Pld	T	G	FG	P
1958–68	Featherstone Rovers	281+6	101	0	0	303

Kenneth Greatorex (16 August 1936 – 12 December 2025) was an English professional rugby league footballer who played in the 1950s and 1960s. He played at club level for Featherstone Rovers.

== Background ==
Greatorex was born on 16 August 1936. He died on 12 December 2025, at the age of 89.

== Playing career ==
Greatorex made his début for Featherstone Rovers on Saturday 11 October 1958.

=== Challenge Cup Final appearances ===
Greatorex played on the wing in Featherstone Rovers' 17-12 victory over Barrow in the 1966–67 Challenge Cup Final during the 1966–67 season at Wembley Stadium, London on Saturday 13 May 1967, in front of a crowd of 76,290.

=== County Cup Final appearances ===
Greatorex played at centre in Featherstone Rovers' 15-14 victory over Hull F.C. in the 1959–60 Yorkshire Cup Final during the 1959–60 season at Headingley, Leeds on Saturday 31 October 1959, played on the wing in the 0-10 defeat by Halifax in the 1963–64 Yorkshire Cup Final during the 1963–64 season at Belle Vue, Wakefield on Saturday 2 November 1963, and played at centre in the 12-25 defeat by Hull Kingston Rovers in the 1966–67 Yorkshire Cup Final during the 1966–67 season at Headingley, Leeds on Saturday 15 October 1966.

=== Testimonial match ===
Greatorex's benefit season at Featherstone Rovers took place during the 1968–69 season.
