= Terry Hudson (rugby league) =

English rugby league footballer

Personal information
- Full name: Terence Hudson
- Born: unknown

Playing information
- Position: Scrum-half, Loose forward
Club
| Years | Team | Pld | T | G | FG | P |
|---|---|---|---|---|---|---|
| 1969–71 | Featherstone Rovers | 182+35 | 30 | 3 | 2 | 99 |
| 1971–75 | Hull Kingston Rovers | 99+7 | 20 | 13 | 0 | 86 |
| 1975–78 | Wakefield Trinity | 80 | 4 | 0 | 0 | 12 |
| 1979–84 | Featherstone Rovers | 131 | 19 | 0 | 1 | 59 |
| 1984–86 | Hunslet | 18 | 0 | 0 | 0 | 0 |
| | Total | 552 | 73 | 16 | 3 | 256 |
Representative
| Years | Team | Pld | T | G | FG | P |
| 1973 | Yorkshire | 1 |

Terry Hudson (birth unknown), also known by the nickname of "Tex", is a former professional rugby league footballer who played in the 1960s, 1970s and 1980s. He played at club level for Featherstone Rovers (two spells) (captain), Hull Kingston Rovers, Wakefield Trinity, and Hunslet, as a scrum-half, or loose forward, and coached at club level for Featherstone Rovers (Assistant Coach to Steve Martin during 1992–94).

== Playing career ==
=== Featherstone Rovers ===
Hudson made his début for Featherstone Rovers and scored a try in the victory over Castleford on Monday 7 April 1969, during his time at Featherstone Rovers he scored twenty-nine 3-point tries, and one 4-point try.

Hudson played as an substitute (replacing left wing David Hartley) in Featherstone Rovers' 9-12 defeat by Hull F.C. in the 1969 Yorkshire Cup Final during the 1969–70 season at Headingley, Leeds on Saturday 20 September 1969, and played scrum-half in the 7–23 defeat by Leeds in the 1970 Yorkshire Cup Final during the 1970–71 season at Odsal Stadium, Bradford on Saturday 21 November 1970.

=== Hull Kingston Rovers ===
In 1971, Hudson was transferred from Featherstone Rovers to Hull Kingston Rovers for a fee of £7,500.

In January 1973, Hudson represented Yorkshire while at Hull Kingston Rovers in a 20–7 win against Cumberland, helping the team retain the County Championship.

=== Return to Featherstone ===
In 1979, Hudson returned to Featherstone Rovers.

Hudson played scrum-half, was the captain, and received a 10-minute sin-bin in Featherstone Rovers' 14-12 victory over Hull F.C. in the 1983 Challenge Cup Final during the 1982–83 season at Wembley Stadium, London on Saturday 7 May 1983, in front of a crowd of 84,969.
