= Barry Hollis =

English rugby league footballer

Personal information
- Full name: Barry Hollis
- Born: second ¼ 1948 (age 76–77); Pontefract district, England

Playing information
- Position: Second-row
Club
Years	Team	Pld	T	G	FG	P
1970–76	Featherstone Rovers	81+5	15	9	0	63
≤1978–≥78	York
	Total	86	15	9	0	63

Barry Hollis (second ¼ 1948) is an English former professional rugby league footballer who played in the 1970s. He played at club level for Featherstone Rovers and York, as an occasional goal-kicking second-row.

== Playing career ==
Barry Hollis made his début for Featherstone Rovers on Saturday 14 March 1970.

=== Challenge Cup Final appearances ===
Barry Hollis appeared as a substitute (replacing at second-row Alan Rhodes) in Featherstone Rovers' 33-14 victory over Bradford Northern in the 1973 Challenge Cup Final during the 1972–73 season at Wembley Stadium, London on Saturday 12 May 1973, in front of a crowd of 72,395.

=== County Cup Final appearances ===
Barry Hollis played at second-row (replaced by substitute Terry Ramshaw), and scored a drop goal in York's 8-18 defeat by Bradford Northern in the 1978 Yorkshire Cup Final during the 1978–79 season at Headingley, Leeds on Saturday 28 October 1978.

== Genealogical information ==
Barry Hollis' marriage to Geraldine (nee Sheard) was registered during third ¼ 1971 in Pontefract district.
