= 1963–64 Yorkshire Cup =

- Structure: Regional knockout championship
- Teams: 16
- Winners: Halifax
- Runners-up: Featherstone Rovers

The 1963–64 Yorkshire Cup was the fifty-sixth occasion on which the Yorkshire Cup competition had been held.

Halifax won the trophy by beating Featherstone Rovers by the score of 10–0

The match was played at Belle Vue, in the City of Wakefield, now in West Yorkshire. The attendance was 13,238 and receipts were £2,471.

== Background ==
This season there were no junior/amateur clubs taking part, no new entrants and no "leavers" and so the total of entries remained the same at sixteen.

This in turn resulted in no byes in the first round.

== Competition and results ==
=== Round 1 ===
Involved 8 matches (with no byes) and 16 clubs

Game No	Fixture date	Home team	Score	Away team	Venue	Att	Rec	Notes	Ref
1	Sat 7 Sep 1963	Batley	6–13	Dewsbury	Mount Pleasant				
2	Sat 7 Sep 1963	Bradford Northern	10–24	Featherstone Rovers	Odsal				
3	Sat 7 Sep 1963	Doncaster	3–2	York	Bentley Road Stadium/Tattersfield				
4	Sat 7 Sep 1963	Halifax	29–5	Keighley	Thrum Hall				
5	Sat 7 Sep 1963	Huddersfield	25–9	Hull F.C.	Fartown	5,906			
6	Sat 7 Sep 1963	Hull Kingston Rovers	17–11	Bramley	Craven Park (1)				
7	Sat 7 Sep 1963	Hunslet	4–9	Wakefield Trinity	Parkside				
8	Sat 7 Sep 1963	Leeds	20–3	Castleford	Headingley				

=== Round 2 - Quarter-finals ===
Involved 4 matches and 8 clubs

Game No	Fixture date	Home team	Score	Away team	Venue	Att	Rec	Notes	Ref
1	Tue 17 Sep 1963	Dewsbury	17–13	Hull Kingston Rovers	Crown Flatt				
2	Tue 17 Sep 1963	Featherstone Rovers	22–12	Leeds	Post Office Road				
3	Mon 23 Sep 1963	Huddersfield	27–0	Doncaster	Fartown	3,923			
4	Mon 23 Sep 1963	Wakefield Trinity	4–12	Halifax	Belle Vue				

=== Round 3 – Semi-finals ===
Involved 2 matches and 4 clubs

Game No	Fixture date	Home team	Score	Away team	Venue	Att	Rec	Notes	Ref
1	Tue 1 Oct 1963	Dewsbury	9–10	Halifax	Crown Flatt				
2	Wed 9 Oct 1963	Featherstone Rovers	22–9	Huddersfield	Post Office Road	7,200			

=== Final ===
Game No	Fixture date	Home team	Score	Away team	Venue	Att	Rec	Notes	Ref
	Saturday 2 November 1963	Halifax	10–0	Featherstone Rovers	Belle Vue	13,238	£2,471	(Note: Belle Vue is the home ground of Wakefield Trinity with a capacity of approximately 12,500. The record attendance was 37,906 on the 21 March 1936 in the Challenge Cup semi-final between Leeds and Huddersfield)	

==== Teams and scorers ====
Halifax	№	Featherstone Rovers
	teams	
Ronald James	1	Jack "Jackie" Fennell
Duncan Jackson	2	Kenneth "Ken" Greatorex
John Burnett	3	Jim Hunt
Colin Dixon	4	Anthony "Tony" Lynch
Johnny Freeman	5	Gary Jordan
Barry Robinson	6	Ivor Lingard
Alan Marchant	7	Don Fox
Frank Fox	8	Abe Terry
John 'Joby' Shaw	9	Willis Fawley
Jack Scroby	10	Malcolm Dixon
Wyn Philips	11	Terry Ramshaw
Terry Fogerty	12	Harry Brown
Charlie Renilson	13	Colin Clifft
??	Coach	John Malpass
10	score	0
2	HT	0
	Scorers	
	Tries	
John Jackson (1)	T	
Charlie Renilson (1)	T	
	Goals	
Ronald James (2)	G	
	Drop Goals	
	DG	
Referee		Dennis Davies (Manchester)

Scoring - Try = three (3) points - Goal = two (2) points - Drop goal = two (2) points

=== The road to success ===
First round
Batley	6
Dewsbury	13
Hull Kingston Rovers	17
Bramley	11
Hunslet	4
Wakefield Trinity	9
Halifax	29
Keighley	5
Bradford Northern	10
Featherstone Rovers	24
Leeds	20
Castleford	3
Huddersfield	25
Hull F.C.	9
Doncaster	3
York	2

Second round
Dewsbury	17
Hull Kingston Rovers	13
Wakefield Trinity	4
Halifax	12
Featherstone Rovers	22
Leeds	12
Huddersfield	27
Doncaster	0

Semi-finals
Dewsbury	9
Halifax	10
Featherstone Rovers	22
Huddersfield	9

Final
Halifax	10
Featherstone Rovers	0

== See also ==
- 1963–64 Northern Rugby Football League season
- Rugby league county cups
