= John Newlove (rugby league) =

English rugby league footballer

Personal information
- Full name: John Newlove
- Born: fourth ¼ 1944 (age 81–82) Pontefract district, England

Playing information
- Position: Wing, Centre, Stand-off
Club
| Years | Team | Pld | T | G | FG | P |
|---|---|---|---|---|---|---|
| 1966–78 | Featherstone Rovers | 382 | 147 | 4 | 1 | 450 |
| 1978–81 | Hull FC | 70 | 14 | 0 | 0 | 42 |
| | Total | 452 | 161 | 4 | 1 | 492 |
Representative
| Years | Team | Pld | T | G | FG | P |
| 1973–75 | Yorkshire | 3 | 0 | 0 | 0 | 0 |
- Relatives: Charlie Stone (brother in law); Paul Newlove (son); Shaun Newlove (son); Richard Newlove (son)

John Newlove (birth registered fourth ¼ 1944) is an English former professional rugby league footballer who played in the 1960s, 1970s and 1980s. He played at club level for Ackworth ARLFC, Featherstone Rovers (captain), and Hull FC, as a wing, centre, or stand-off.

== Background ==
John Newlove's birth was registered in Pontefract district, West Riding of Yorkshire, England.

== Playing career ==
=== Championship appearances ===
John Newlove played in Featherstone Rovers' victory in Championship during the 1976–77 season, although he sustained an injury which kept him out during the run-in to the title.

=== Challenge Cup Final appearances ===
John Newlove was named as centre in the official matchday programme, but was actually a reserve to travel in Featherstone Rovers' 17–12 victory over Barrow in the 1966–67 Challenge Cup Final during the 1966–67 season at Wembley Stadium, London on Saturday 13 May 1967, in front of a crowd of 76,290, played at centre, was captain, and scored two tries in the 33–14 victory over Bradford Northern in the 1972–73 Challenge Cup Final during the 1972–73 season at Wembley Stadium, London on Saturday 12 May 1973, in front of a crowd of 72,395, played stand-off in the 9–24 defeat by Warrington in the 1973–74 Challenge Cup Final during the 1973–74 season at Wembley Stadium, London on Saturday 11 May 1974, in front of a crowd of 77,400, and played stand-off (replaced by substitute Brian Hancock on 71-minutes) in Hull FC's 5–10 defeat by Hull Kingston Rovers in the 1980–81 Challenge Cup Final during the 1979–80 season at Wembley Stadium, London on Saturday 3 May 1980, in front of a crowd of 95,000.

=== County Cup Final appearances ===
John Newlove played on the wing in Featherstone Rovers' 9–12 defeat by Hull F.C. in the 1969–70 Yorkshire Cup Final during the 1969–70 season at Headingley, Leeds on Saturday 20 September 1969, played at centre in the 7–23 defeat by Leeds in the 1970–71 Yorkshire Cup Final during the 1970–71 season at Odsal Stadium, Bradford on Saturday 21 November 1970, played stand-off in the 12–16 defeat by Leeds in the 1976–77 Yorkshire Cup Final during the 1976–77 season at Headingley, Leeds on Saturday 16 October 1976, and played stand-off in the 7–17 defeat by Castleford in the 1977–78 Yorkshire Cup Final during the 1977–78 season at Headingley, Leeds on Saturday 15 October 1977.

=== BBC2 Floodlit Trophy Final appearances ===
John Newlove played stand-off in Hull FC's 13–3 victory over Hull Kingston Rovers in the 1979 BBC2 Floodlit Trophy Final during the 1979-80 season at The Boulevard, Kingston upon Hull on Tuesday 18 December 1979.

=== Club career ===
John Newlove made his début for Featherstone Rovers on Saturday 19 November 1966.

=== Testimonial match ===
John Newlove's benefit season/testimonial match at Featherstone Rovers took place during the 1977–78 season.

== Honoured at Featherstone Rovers ==
John Newlove is a Featherstone Rovers Hall of Fame inductee.

== Genealogical information ==
John Newlove's marriage to Margaret (née Stone, and sister of the rugby league footballer; Richard 'Charlie' Stone) was registered during second ¼ 1970 in Pontefract district. They had children; the future rugby league footballer who played in the 1980s and 1990s for Featherstone Rovers; Shaun Newlove, the future rugby league footballer; Paul Newlove, and the future rugby league footballer Richard Newlove.
