= David Treasure =

Wales international rugby league footballer

Personal information
- Full name: David Treasure
- Born: 7 December 1950 (age 75) Castleford, England

Playing information
- Position: Centre, Stand-off, Scrum-half
Club
| Years | Team | Pld | T | G | FG | P |
|---|---|---|---|---|---|---|
| 1971–73 | Bradford Northern | 83 | 26 | 3 | 0 | 84 |
| 1973–77 | Oldham | 112 | 37 | 10 | 1 | 132 |
| 1977–78 | Leeds | 16 | 8 | 0 | 1 | 25 |
| | Total | 211 | 71 | 13 | 2 | 241 |
Representative
| Years | Team | Pld | T | G | FG | P |
| 1975–77 | Wales | 5 | 1 | 0 | 0 | 3 |

David Treasure (born 7 December 1950) is an English-born former professional rugby league footballer who played in the 1970s. He played at representative level for Wales, and at club level for Bradford Northern, Oldham, Leeds and Keighley as a centre, stand-off, or scrum-half.

== Background ==
David Treasure is the son of Wilfred Treasure, and Catherine (née Hopton); he was born in Castleford, West Riding of Yorkshire.

== Playing career ==
=== Club career ===
Treasure made his début for Bradford Northern at Fartown Ground, Huddersfield in February 1971. He appeared as a substitute (replacing stand-off Mick Blacker) in Bradford Northern's 14–33 defeat by Featherstone Rovers in the 1973 Challenge Cup Final at Wembley Stadium, London on Saturday 12 May 1973.

He was transferred from Bradford Northern to Oldham in November 1973.

In August 1977, Treasure was sold to Leeds for a "substantial fee". A year later, he was transferred to Keighley.

=== International honours ===
Treasure was eligible to play for Wales through ancestry, and won caps for Wales while at Oldham in the 1975 Rugby League World Cup; he played stand-off, and scored a try in the 12-7 victory over England at Lang Park, Brisbane on Tuesday 10 June 1975, played scrum-half in the 8-18 defeat by Australia at Sydney Cricket Ground, Sydney on Saturday 14 June 1975, played stand-off in the 8-13 defeat by New Zealand at Carlaw Park, Auckland on Saturday 28 June 1975, and played stand-off in the 16-22 defeat by England at Wilderspool Stadium, Warrington on Saturday 20 September 1975, and in the 1977 European Championship; he played at centre in the 2-13 defeat by France at Stade des Minimes, Toulouse on Sunday 20 February 1977.
