= Gary Jordan =

English rugby league footballer (died 2018)

Personal information
- Full name: Gary Jordan
- Born: circa-1941
- Died: 22 April 2018 (aged 76–77)

Playing information
- Position: Wing, Centre
Club
Years	Team	Pld	T	G	FG	P
1961–70	Featherstone Rovers	228+1	115	0	0	345
1969–71	Castleford	3	0	0	0	0
	Total	232	115	0	0	345
Representative
Years	Team	Pld	T	G	FG	P
1964–67	Great Britain	2	1	0	0	3

Gary Jordan (unknown – 22 April 2018) was an English professional rugby league footballer who played in the 1960s and 1970s. He played at representative level for Great Britain, and at club level for Featherstone Rovers and Castleford as a wing or centre.

== Playing career ==
=== International honours ===
Gary Jordan won caps for Great Britain while at Featherstone Rovers in 1964 against France, and in 1967 against Australia.

=== Challenge Cup Final appearances ===
Gary Jordan played left-centre in Featherstone Rovers' 17-12 victory over Barrow in the 1966–67 Challenge Cup Final during the 1966–67 season at Wembley Stadium, London on Saturday 13 May 1967, in front of a crowd of 76,290.

=== County Cup Final appearances ===
Gary Jordan played left wing in Featherstone Rovers' 0-10 defeat by Halifax in the 1963–64 Yorkshire Cup Final during the 1963–64 season at Belle Vue, Wakefield on Saturday 2 November 1963, and played right-centre in the 9-12 defeat by Hull F.C. in the 1969–70 Yorkshire Cup Final during the 1969–70 season at Headingley, Leeds on Saturday 20 September 1969.

=== Club career ===
Gary Jordan made his début for Featherstone Rovers on Saturday 19 August 1961, and he played his last match for Featherstone Rovers during the 1969–70 season.
