= 1978–79 Yorkshire Cup =

- Structure: Regional knockout championship
- Teams: 16
- Winners: Bradford Northern
- Runners-up: York

The 1978–79 Yorkshire Cup was the seventy-first occasion on which the Yorkshire Cup competition had been held.

Bradford Northern won the trophy by beating York by the score of 18–8

The match was played at Headingley, Leeds, now in West Yorkshire. The attendance was 10,429 and receipts were £9,188

== Background ==
This season there were no junior/amateur clubs taking part, no new entrants and no "leavers" and so the total of entries remained the same at sixteen.

This in turn resulted in no byes in the first round.

== Competition and results ==
=== Round 1 ===
Involved 8 matches (with no byes) and 16 clubs

Game No	Fixture date	Home team	Score	Away team	Venue	Att	Rec	Notes	Ref
1	Sun 20 Aug 1978	Batley	8–24	Halifax	Mount Pleasant				
2	Sun 20 Aug 1978	Bradford Northern	24–23	Leeds	Odsal				
3	Sun 20 Aug 1978	Bramley	4–13	Hull F.C.	McLaren Field				
4	Sun 20 Aug 1978	Castleford	18–11	Dewsbury	Wheldon Road				
5	Sun 20 Aug 1978	Doncaster	5–20	Keighley	Bentley Road Stadium/Tattersfield				
6	Sun 20 Aug 1978	Featherstone Rovers	23–8	Huddersfield	Post Office Road				
7	Sun 20 Aug 1978	Wakefield Trinity	11–16	Hull Kingston Rovers	Belle Vue				
8	Sun 20 Aug 1978	York	25–19	New Hunslet	Clarence Street				

=== Round 2 - Quarter-finals ===
Involved 4 matches and 8 clubs

Game No	Fixture date	Home team	Score	Away team	Venue	Att	Rec	Notes	Ref
1	Sun 27 Aug 1978	Bradford Northern	28–17	Hull Kingston Rovers	Odsal				
2	Sun 27 Aug 1978	Featherstone Rovers	8–20	Hull F.C.	Post Office Road				
3	Sun 27 Aug 1978	Halifax	20–8	Castleford	Thrum Hall				
4	Sun 27 Aug 1978	York	13–6	Keighley	Clarence Street				

=== Round 3 – Semi-finals ===
Involved 2 matches and 4 clubs

Game No	Fixture date	Home team	Score	Away team	Venue	Att	Rec	Notes	Ref
1	Wed 13 Sep 1978	Bradford Northern	12–7	Hull F.C.	Odsal				
2	Tue 19 Sep 1978	Halifax	2–4	York	Thrum Hall				

=== Final ===
Game No	Fixture date	Home team	Score	Away team	Venue	Att	Rec	Notes	Ref
	Saturday 28 October 1978	Bradford Northern	18–8	York	Headingley	10,429	£9,188	(Note: Headingley, Leeds, is the home ground of Leeds RLFC with a capacity of 21,000. The record attendance was 40,175 for a league match between Leeds and Bradford Northern on 21 May 1947.)	

==== Teams and scorers ====
Bradford Northern	№	York
	teams	
Keith Mumby	1	Gary Smith
David Barends	2	Terry Morgan
Les Gant	3	Terry Day
Derrick Parker	4	Derek Foster
David Redfearn	5	Gary Nicholson
Ian Slater	6	Barry Banks
Alan Redfearn	7	Paul Harkin
Jimmy Thompson	8	David Dunkerley
Tony Fisher	9	Ron Wileman
Colin Forsyth	10	Billy Harris
Neil Fox	11	Alan Rhodes
Dennis Trotter	12	Barry Hollis
Bob Haigh	13	Stephen/Steven "Steve" Cooper
Johnny Wolford (for Ian Slater)	14	John Crossley, Jr. (for Terry Day)
Graham Joyce (for Colin Forsyth)	15	Terry Ramshaw (for Barry Hollis)
Peter Fox	Coach	??
18	score	8
7	HT	5
	Scorers	
	Tries	
Les Gant (1)	T	Gary Smith (1)
Derrick Parker (1)	T	
Alan Redfearn (1)	T	
Bob Haigh (1)	T	
	Goals	
Neil Fox (3)	G	Barry Banks (2)
	Drop Goals	
	DG	Barry Hollis (1)
Referee		Michael "Mick" J. Naughton (Widnes)
White Rose Trophy for Man of the match		Bob Haigh - Bradford Northern - loose forward
sponsored by		
Competition Sponsor		Esso

Scoring - Try = three points - Goal = two points - Drop goal = one point

=== The road to success ===
First round
Bradford Northern	24
Leeds	23
Wakefield Trinity	11
Hull Kingston Rovers	16
Featherstone Rovers	23
Huddersfield	8
Bramley	4
Hull F.C.	13
Batley	8
Halifax	24
Castleford	18
Dewsbury	11
York	25
New Hunslet	19
Doncaster	5
Keighley	20

Second round
Bradford Northern	28
Hull Kingston Rovers	17
Featherstone Rovers	8
Hull F.C.	20
Halifax	20
Castleford	8
York	13
Keighley	6

Semi-finals
Bradford Northern	12
Hull F.C.	7
Halifax	2
York	4

Final
Bradford Northern	18
York	8

== See also ==
- 1978–79 Northern Rugby Football League season
- Rugby league county cups
