= New Love (disambiguation) =

"New Love" is a song by Dua Lipa from her 2015 self-titled album.

New Love may also refer to:

- New Love (Former Ghosts album), 2010
- New Love (B'z album), 2019
- "New Love" (Silk City song), song by Silk City featuring Ellie Goulding, 2021
- New Love, a 1979 album by Metro
- "New Love", song from the film Beach Blanket Bingo performed on screen by Jackie Ward and lip-synced by Linda Evans
- "New Love", song by Cherrelle from High Priority, 1989
- "New Love", song by Donna Loren, 1965
- "New Love", song by Gavin DeGraw from Something Worth Saving, 2016
- "New Love", song by Girl in Red from I'm Doing It Again Baby!, 2024
- "New Love", song by Glenn Frey from The Allnighter, 1984
- "New Love", song by Jeffrey Osborne from his self-titled album, 1982
- "New Love", song by the Arches featuring Karen Harding, 2015
- "New Love", song by Marie Osmond from I Only Wanted You, 1986
- "New Love", song by The Muffs, 1991
- "New Love", song by Stanley Jordan from Magic Touch, 1985
- "New Love", song by Voxtrot from their self-titled album, 2007
- "New Love", song by Maroon 5 from V, 2014

== See also ==
- Newlove (disambiguation)
