= David Dunkerley =

English rugby league footballer

Personal information
- Born: 1952 (age 72–73) Leeds, England

Playing information
- Position: Prop, Second-row
Club
Years	Team	Pld	T	G	FG	P
≤1973–≥73	Keighley
1975–84	York	208
	Total	208	0	0	0	0

David Dunkerley (born 1952) is a former professional rugby league footballer who played in the 1970s and 1980s. He played at club level for Leeds (Under-17s, and A-Team), Keighley, and York, as a prop or second-row.

== Background ==
David Dunkerley worked at St James's University Hospital, Leeds.

== Playing career ==
=== County Cup Final appearances ===
David Dunkerley played left-prop in York's 8-18 defeat by Bradford Northern in the 1978–79 Yorkshire Cup Final during the 1978–79 season at Headingley, Leeds on Saturday 28 October 1978, in front of a crowd of 10,429.

=== Notable tour matches ===
David Dunkerley played in York's 2-29 defeat by Australia at Clarence Street, York on Tuesday 14 November 1978, under temporary floodlights.

=== Club career ===
David Dunkerley broke his collar bone during mid-November 1975, and returned to play 6-weeks later in the match against Hull F.C. at The Boulevard, Kingston upon Hull on Thursday 1 January 1976, 3-days later he broke his collar bone again in the match against Barrow at Clarence Street, York on Sunday 4 January 1976, he returned to training during March 1976, but he played no further matches in the during the 1975–76 season.

In 2015, Dunkerley was inducted into the York Rugby League Hall of Fame.
