= Jimmy Thompson (rugby league) =

GB & England international rugby league footballer

Personal information
- Full name: James Thompson
- Born: c. 1948 (age 77–78) Pontefract, Yorkshire

Playing information
- Position: Prop, Second-row
Club
| Years | Team | Pld | T | G | FG | P |
|---|---|---|---|---|---|---|
| 1966–77 | Featherstone Rovers | 282 | 41 | 0 | 0 | 123 |
| 1977–81 | Bradford Northern | 145 | 11 | 0 | 1 | 34 |
| 1981–82 | Carlisle | 21 | 1 | 0 | 0 | 3 |
| | Total | 448 | 53 | 0 | 1 | 160 |
Representative
| Years | Team | Pld | T | G | FG | P |
| 1969 | Great Britain U-24 | 1 | 0 | 0 | 0 | 0 |
| 1969–77 | Yorkshire | 12 | 4 | 0 | 0 | 12 |
| 1970–78 | England | 5 | 0 | 0 | 0 | 0 |
| 1970–78 | Great Britain | 21 | 1 | 0 | 0 | 3 |

James Thompson (born c. 1948) is an English former professional rugby league footballer who played in the 1960s, 1970s and 1980s. He played at representative level for Great Britain, England and Yorkshire, and at club level for Featherstone Rovers, Bradford Northern (captain) and Carlisle, as a prop or second-row.

== Playing career ==
=== Featherstone Rovers ===
Jimmy Thompson made his début for Featherstone Rovers on 1 October 1966 as a substitute against Hull Kingston Rovers.

Thompson played right-second-row in Featherstone Rovers' 17–12 victory over Barrow in the 1966–67 Challenge Cup Final during the 1966–67 season at Wembley Stadium, London on Saturday 13 May 1967, in front of a crowd of 76,290, played right-second-row in the 33–14 victory over Bradford Northern in the 1972–73 Challenge Cup Final during the 1972–73 season at Wembley Stadium, London on Saturday 12 May 1973, in front of a crowd of 72,395, and played right-second-row in the 9–24 defeat by Warrington in the 1973–74 Challenge Cup Final during the 1973–74 season at Wembley Stadium, London on Saturday 11 May 1974, in front of a crowd of 77,400.

Thompson played right-second-row in Featherstone Rovers' 9–12 defeat by Hull F.C. in the 1969–70 Yorkshire Cup Final during the 1969–70 season at Headingley, Leeds on Saturday 20 September 1969, played right-second-row in the 7–23 defeat by Leeds in the 1970–71 Yorkshire Cup Final during the 1970–71 season at Odsal Stadium, Bradford on Saturday 21 November 1970.

Jimmy Thompson's benefit season/testimonial match at Featherstone Rovers took place during the 1976–77 season.

=== Bradford Northern ===
Thompson played left-prop in Bradford Northern's 18–8 victory over York in the 1978–79 Yorkshire Cup Final during the 1978–79 season at Headingley, Leeds on Saturday 28 October 1978.

He played left-prop in Bradford Northern's 6–0 victory over Widnes in the 1979–80 John Player Trophy Final during the 1979–80 season at Headingley, Leeds on Saturday 5 January 1980.

=== Representative honours ===
Jimmy Thompson won caps for England while at Featherstone Rovers in 1970 against France, in the 1975 Rugby League World Cup against Australia (2 matches), in 1977 against Wales, and while at Bradford Northern in 1978 against France (sub), and Wales (sub), and won caps for Great Britain while at Featherstone Rovers in 1970 against Australia (2 matches), and New Zealand (2 matches), in the 1970 Rugby League World Cup Australia, France, New Zealand, and Australia, in 1971 against France (2 matches), in 1974 against Australia (3 matches), and New Zealand (3 matches), in the 1977 Rugby League World Cup against France, New Zealand, and Australia (2 matches), and while at Bradford Northern in 1978 against Australia.

Jimmy Thompson won caps for Yorkshire while at Featherstone Rovers; during the 1969–70 season against Cumberland, during the 1970–71 season against Cumberland and Lancashire, during the 1973–74 season against Cumbria and Lancashire, during the 1974–75 season against Other Nationalities, during the 1975–76 season against Cumbria, Other Nationalities and Lancashire, and during the 1975–76 season against Cumbria and Lancashire.

== Honoured at Featherstone Rovers ==
Jimmy Thompson is a Featherstone Rovers Hall of Fame inductee.
