= Dale Fennell =

English rugby league footballer

Personal information
- Full name: Dale Fennell
- Born: 3 June 1957 (age 69) Pontefract district, England

Playing information
- Position: Stand-off, Scrum-half
Club
Years	Team	Pld	T	G	FG	P
1975–80	Featherstone Rovers	96	19	0	0	57
1980–82	Wakefield Trinity	28	4	1	3	17
1982–86	Bradford Northern	33	3	0	3
	→ Huddersfield (loan)	3
	Total	160	26	1	6	74
Representative
Years	Team	Pld	T	G	FG	P
1978	Great Britain U-24	1	0	0	0	0
- Father: Jack Fennell
- Relatives: Thomas Smales (uncle)

Dale Fennell (born 3 June 1957) is an English former professional rugby league footballer who played in the 1970s and 1980s. He played at representative level for Great Britain (Under-24s), and at club level for Featherstone Rovers, Wakefield Trinity, Bradford Northern and Huddersfield (loan), as a stand-off or scrum-half.

== Background ==
Dale Fennell's birth was registered in Pontefract district, West Riding of Yorkshire, England, he was a pupil at Normanton Grammar School.

== Playing career ==
=== International honours ===
Dale Fennell represented Great Britain (Under-24s) (alongside teammates; Peter Smith and Steve Evans) in the 8-30 defeat by Australia in the 1978 Kangaroo tour of Great Britain and France match, at Craven Park, Hull on Wednesday 4 October 1978, in front of a crowd of 6,418.

=== Championship appearances ===
Dale Fennell played in Featherstone Rovers' Championship victory during the 1976–77 season.

=== County Cup Final appearances ===
Dale Fennell played scrum-half in Featherstone Rovers' 12-16 defeat by Leeds in the 1976–77 Yorkshire Cup Final during the 1976–77 season at Headingley, Leeds on Saturday 16 October 1976, in front of a crowd of 7,645.

=== Club career ===
Dale Fennell made his début for Featherstone Rovers playing scrum-half against St. Helens at Knowsley Road, St. Helens on Friday 22 August 1975, and he played his last match for Featherstone Rovers during the 1979–80 season, he was transferred from Featherstone Rovers to Wakefield Trinity, he made his début for Wakefield Trinity during February 1980, he played his last match for Wakefield Trinity during the 1981–82 season, he was transferred from Wakefield Trinity to Bradford Northern, he scored Bradford Northern's first ever competitive 4-point try in the 24th minute against Whitehaven during the first match of the 1983–84 season at Recreation Ground, Whitehaven.

== Personal life ==
Dale Fennell is the son of the rugby league footballer; Jack Fennell, the nephew of the rugby league footballer; Thomas Smales, and the brother-in-law of the rugby league footballer; Ian Sheldon.
