= David Busfield =

Former RL coach & professional rugby league footballer

Dave Busfield
Personal information
- Full name: David Busfield
- Born: 22 November 1953 (age 71); Shawcross, Dewsbury England

Playing information
- Position: Backs, Forwards
Club
Years	Team	Pld	T	G	FG	P
1972–78	Featherstone Rovers	86	28	0	0	84
1978–81	Halifax	67	22	0	1	67
1981	Huddersfield	6	0	0	0	0
1981	Wakefield Trinity	3	1	0	0	3
1981–82	Hull FC	4	1	0	0	3
1982–83	Bramley	5	4	0	0	12
1984–85	Dewsbury	40	4	0	0	16
	Total	211	60	0	1	185

Coaching information
Club
Years	Team	Gms	W	D	L	W%
1987	Dewsbury

David Busfield (born 22 November 1953) is an English former professional rugby league footballer who played in the 1970s and 1980s, and coached in the 1980s. He played at club level for Featherstone Rovers, Halifax, Wakefield Trinity, Hull FC, and Dewsbury, as a back, or forward, and coached at club level for Dewsbury, Batley and Royal Air Force (RL).

== Background ==
Busfield was born in Shawcross, Dewsbury, West Yorkshire, England.

== Playing career ==
=== Challenge Cup Final appearances ===
Dave Busfield appeared as a substitute (replacing second-row Alan Rhodes) in Featherstone Rovers' 9–24 defeat by Warrington in the 1973–74 Challenge Cup Final during the 1973–74 season at Wembley Stadium, London on Saturday 11 May 1974, in front of a crowd of 77,400.

=== County Cup Final appearances ===
Dave Busfield played loose forward in Halifax's 6-15 defeat by Leeds in the 1979–80 Yorkshire Cup Final during the 1979–80 season at Headingley, Leeds on Saturday 27 October 1979.
