= Terry Ramshaw =

English rugby league footballer

Personal information
- Full name: Terence Ramshaw
- Born: 15 October 1943 Pontefract district, England
- Died: 9 January 2017 (aged 73)

Playing information
- Position: Prop, Second-row
Club
Years	Team	Pld	T	G	FG	P
1960–65	Featherstone Rovers	100
1965–67	Halifax
1967–68	Bradford Northern
1968–71	Wakefield Trinity	81	15	0	0	45
1971–74	Salford	41
1974–75	Hull Kingston Rovers	18	0	0	0	0
1975–77	Oldham RLFC	33	1	0	0	3
≥1976–78	York
	Total	273	16	0	0	48
Representative
Years	Team	Pld	T	G	FG	P
1965	Great Britain U-24	1	0	0	0	0
1966–68	Yorkshire	3	3	0	0	9

Coaching information
Club
Years	Team	Gms	W	D	L	W%
1977	Oldham RLFC

Terence "Terry" Ramshaw (c. 1943 – 9 January 2017) was an English professional rugby league footballer who played in the 1960s and 1970s. He played at representative level for Yorkshire, and at club level for Castleford Juniors, Featherstone Rovers, Halifax, Bradford Northern, Wakefield Trinity, Salford, Hull Kingston Rovers, Oldham and York as a prop, or second-row.

== Background ==
Ramshaw's birth was registered in Pontefract district, West Riding of Yorkshire, England, and he died aged 73.

== Playing career ==
=== Featherstone Rovers ===
Ramshaw made his début for Featherstone Rovers on Saturday 19 August 1961, he played his last match for Featherstone Rovers during the 1965–66 season, he was transferred from Featherstone Rovers to Halifax.

Ramshaw played at second-row in Featherstone Rovers' 0–10 defeat by Halifax in the 1963–64 Yorkshire Cup Final during the 1963-64 season at Belle Vue, Wakefield on Saturday 2 November 1963, in front of a crowd of 13,238.

Ramshaw played, and scored the winning try in Featherstone Rovers' 23–17 victory over Australia in the 1963–64 Kangaroo tour of Great Britain and France match during the 1963-64 season at Post Office Road, Featherstone on Wednesday 2 October 1963, in front of a crowd of 7,898.

=== Halifax ===
Ramshaw played in Halifax's 12–35 defeat by St Helens in the Championship Final during the 1965-66 season at Station Road, Swinton on Saturday 28 May 1966.

He was transferred from Halifax to Bradford Northern during October 1967.

=== Wakefield Trinity ===
He was transferred from Bradford Northern to Wakefield Trinity during August 1968. He made his début for the club, and scored a try, in the 31–12 victory over Salford at Belle Vue, Wakefield on Saturday 24 August 1968. He scored two tries in the 59–3 victory over Hunslet F.C. during March 1970. He scored two tries in the 42–6 win over Workington Town in December 1970. He played second-row alongside Peter Harrison in his last match for Wakefield Trinity in the 38–10 victory over Barrow at Belle Vue, Wakefield on Saturday 2 October 1971.

Ramshaw played in Wakefield Trinity's defeat by Castleford in the 1968–69 Challenge Cup semi-final during the 1968-69 season.

Ramshaw played in Wakefield Trinity's 15-49 defeat by Wigan in the Championship semi-final during the 1970-71 season.

He was transferred from Wakefield Trinity to Salford during October 1971.

=== Salford ===
Ramshaw played prop in Salford's 7–12 defeat by Leeds in the 1973 Player's No.6 Trophy Final during the 1972-73 season at Fartown Ground, Huddersfield on Saturday 24 March 1973, in front of a crowd of 10,102.

=== Later career ===
He was transferred from Salford to Hull Kingston Rovers before later moving to Oldham. He made his début for Oldham during the 1975–76 season, and played his last match for Oldham during the 1976–77 season. He was then transferred from Oldham to York.

Ramshaw appeared as a substitute (replacing second-row Barry Hollis) in York's 8–18 defeat by Bradford Northern in the 1978–79 Yorkshire Cup Final during the 1978-79 season at Headingley, Leeds on Saturday 28 October 1978, in front of a crowd of 10,429.

=== Representative honours ===
On 3 April 1965, Ramshaw played in the first ever Great Britain under-24 international match in a 17–9 win against France under-24's.

Ramshaw played in Yorkshire's 17–22 defeat by Lancashire in the 1966-67 County Championship during the 1966-67 season at Headingley, Leeds on Wednesday 21 September 1966.

== Personal life ==
Terry Ramshaw's son, Jason, played rugby league for Halifax and Keighley Cougars.
