= 1959–60 Yorkshire Cup =

- Structure: Regional knockout championship
- Teams: 16
- Winners: Featherstone Rovers
- Runners-up: Hull F.C.

The 1959–60 Yorkshire Cup was the fifty-second occasion on which the Yorkshire Cup competition was held.

For the first time in fourteen years a new name appeared on the Yorkshire Cup. Featherstone Rovers, who previously won the trophy in the spring 1940 wartime competition, could now lay claim to a genuine trophy; the wartime competitions were not counted officially in the records.

Featherstone Rovers won the trophy by beating Hull F.C. by a score of 15–14.

The match was played at Headingley, Leeds, now in West Yorkshire. The attendance was 23,983 and receipts were £4156.

== Background ==
This season there were no junior/amateur clubs taking part, no new entrants and no "leavers", so the total of entries remained the same, at sixteen.

This in turn resulted in no byes in the first round.

== Competition and results ==
=== Round 1 ===
Round 1 involved eight matches (with no byes) and 16 clubs.

Game no.	Fixture date	Home team	Score	Away team	Venue	Att	Rec	Notes	Ref
1	Fri 28 Aug 1959	Leeds	28–14	Keighley	Headingley				
2	Sat 29 Aug 1959	Bradford Northern	10–23	Hull F.C.	Odsal				
3	Sat 29 Aug 1959	Bramley	17–10	York	Barley Mow				
4	Sat 29 Aug 1959	Dewsbury	27–14	Castleford	Crown Flatt				
5	Sat 29 Aug 1959	Featherstone Rovers	24–9	Hull Kingston Rovers	Post Office Road				
6	Sat 29 Aug 1959	Halifax	17–14	Wakefield Trinity	Thrum Hall				
7	Sat 29 Aug 1959	Huddersfield	46–12	Doncaster	Fartown	3809			
8	Sat 29 Aug 1959	Hunslet	46–8	Batley	Parkside				

=== Round 2 – quarterfinals ===
Round 2's quarterfinals involved four matches and eight clubs.

Game no.	Fixture date	Home team	Score	Away team	Venue	Att	Rec	Notes	Ref
1	Mon 7 Sep 1959	Leeds	15–10	Hunslet	Headingley				
2	Tue 8 Sep 1959	Bramley	14–17	Hull F.C.	Barley Mow				
3	Wed 9 Sep 1959	Featherstone Rovers	32–18	Dewsbury	Post Office Road				
4	Mon 14 Sep 1959	Huddersfield	9–16	Halifax	Fartown	11435			

=== Round 3 – semifinals ===
Round 3's semifinals involved two matches and four clubs.

Game no.	Fixture date	Home team	Score	Away team	Venue	Att	Rec	Notes	Ref
1	Thu 24 Sep 1959	Hull F.C.	18–9	Halifax	Boulevard				
2	Wed 30 Sep 1959	Featherstone Rovers	14–7	Leeds	Post Office Road				

=== Final ===
Game no.	Fixture date	Home team	Score	Away team	Venue	Att	Rec	Notes	Ref
	Saturday 31 October 1959	Featherstone Rovers	15–14	Hull F.C.	Headingley	23,983	£4,156	(Note: Headingley, Leeds, is the home ground of Leeds RLFC, with a capacity of 21,000. The record attendance was 40,175 for a league match between Leeds and Bradford Northern on 21 May 1947.)	

==== Teams and scorers ====
Featherstone Rovers	No.	Hull F.C.
	Teams	
Jack "Jackie" Fennell	1	Peter Bateson
Frank "Cheyenne" Smith	2	Stan Cowan
Ken Greatorex	3	Brian Cooper
Jim Hunt	4	Brian Saville
Cyril Woolford	5	Dennis Nicholson
Joe Mullaney (c)	6	George Matthews
Don Fox	7	Tommy Finn
Joe Anderson	8	Mick Scott
Willis Fawley	9	Tommy Harris
Malcolm Dixon	10	Jim Drake
Mick Clamp	11	Cyril Sykes
Cliff Lambert	12	Bill Drake
Terry Clawson	13	Johnny Whiteley
Harold Moxon	Coach	Roy Francis
15	Score	14
13	HT	7
	Scorers	
	Tries	
Don Fox (1)	T	Johnny Whiteley (1)
Cliff Lambert (1)	T	Brian Saville (1)
Cyril Woolford (1)	T	
	Goals	
Terry Clawson (4)	G	Peter Bateson (4)
	G	
	Drop goals	
	DG	
Referee		Charlie Appleton (Warrington)

Scoring - Try = three (3) points - Goal = two (2) points - Drop goal = two (2) points

=== The road to success ===
First round
Featherstone Rovers	24
Hull Kingston Rovers	9
Dewsbury	27
Castleford	14
Leeds	28
Keighley	14
Hunslet	46
Batley	8
Bramley	17
York	10
Bradford Northern	10
Hull F.C.	23
Huddersfield	46
Doncaster	12
Halifax	17
Wakefield Trinity	14

Second round
Featherstone Rovers	32
Dewsbury	18
Leeds	15
Hunslet	10
Bramley	14
Hull F.C.	17
Huddersfield	9
Halifax	16

Semifinals
Featherstone Rovers	14
Leeds	7
Hull F.C.	18
Halifax	9

Final
Featherstone Rovers	15
Hull F.C.	14

== See also ==
- 1959–60 Northern Rugby Football League season
- Rugby league county cups
