= Brian Wrigglesworth =

English rugby league footballer

Personal information
- Full name: Brian Wrigglesworth
- Born: c. 1935
- Died: 1 December 2015 (aged 80) Airedale, Castleford, England

Playing information
- Position: Fullback, Centre, Stand-off
Club
Years	Team	Pld	T	G	FG	P
1956–58	Doncaster	89	38	3	0	120
1958–65	Bramley
1965–66	Hull Kingston Rovers	21+2	10	0	0	30
1966–70	Featherstone Rovers	66	11	1	0	35
	Total	178	59	4	0	185
Representative
Years	Team	Pld	T	G	FG	P
1959–63	Yorkshire	2	1	0	0	3

Brian Wrigglesworth (c. 1935 – 1 December 2015) was an English professional rugby league footballer who played in the 1950s, 1960s and 1970s, and coached in the 1970s. He played at representative level for Yorkshire, and at club level for Allerton Bywater ARLFC (in Allerton Bywater, Leeds), Doncaster, Bramley, Hull Kingston Rovers and Featherstone Rovers, as a fullback, centre, or stand-off, and coached at Featherstone Rovers (A-Team, 1971–72 season Championship Shield winners).

== Playing career ==
Wrigglesworth made his début for Featherstone Rovers on Monday 29 August 1966, and he played his last match for Featherstone Rovers during the 1970–71 season.

=== County honours ===
Wrigglesworth won cap(s) for Yorkshire while at Bramley as a stand-off.

=== Challenge Cup Final appearances ===
Wrigglesworth played fullback in Featherstone Rovers' 17-12 victory over Barrow in the 1966–67 Challenge Cup Final during the 1966–67 season at Wembley Stadium, London on Saturday 13 May 1967, in front of a crowd of 76,290.

=== County Cup Final appearances ===
Wrigglesworth played at centre and scored a try in Featherstone Rovers' 12-25 defeat by Hull Kingston Rovers in the 1966–67 Yorkshire Cup Final during the 1966–67 season at Headingley, Leeds on Saturday 15 October 1966.
