= Tommy Smales =

Former RL coach and GB & England international rugby league footballer

Personal information
- Full name: Thomas Smales
- Born: 19 December 1938 (age 87) Pontefract, West Riding of Yorkshire, England

Playing information
- Position: Loose forward
Club
Years	Team	Pld	T	G	FG	P
1958–60	Wigan	11	3	4		17
1960–65	Barrow
1965–69	Featherstone Rovers	130	24	269		610
	Total	141	27	273	0	627

Coaching information
Club
Years	Team	Gms	W	D	L	W%
1973	Dewsbury
1974	Featherstone Rovers	7	3			43
1977	Bramley
1978	Doncaster
1979–81	Batley
1983–84	Dewsbury
	Total	7	3	0	0	43
- Relatives: Ian Smales (son)

Thomas Smales (born 19 December 1938) is an English former professional rugby league footballer who played in the 1950s and 1960s, and coached in the 1970s and 1980s. He played at club level for Wigan, Barrow and Featherstone Rovers as a loose forward, and coached at club level for Dewsbury (two spells), Featherstone Rovers, Bramley, Doncaster and Batley.

== Background ==
Smales' birth was registered in Pontefract district, West Riding of Yorkshire, England.

He is the father of the rugby league footballer; Ian Smales.

== Playing career ==
Smales made his début for Wigan in the 46–5 victory over Featherstone Rovers at Central Park, Wigan on Saturday 20 September 1958, he scored his first try (2-tries) for Wigan in the 23–16 victory over Rochdale Hornets at Athletic Ground, Rochdale on Saturday 4 October 1958, he scored his last try for Wigan in the 16–14 victory over Swinton at Station Road, Swinton on Saturday 23 April 1960, and he played his last match for Wigan in the 17–23 defeat by Hunslet at Central Park, Wigan on Saturday 10 September 1960.

After a period spent playing for Barrow, Smales then played for Featherstone Rovers, making his debut in September 1965. He played loose forward, and scored 3-goals in Featherstone Rovers' 12–25 defeat by Hull Kingston Rovers in the 1966–67 Yorkshire Cup Final during the 1966–67 season at Headingley, Leeds on Saturday 15 October 1966. Smales played loose forward, scored a try, two conversion's, and a penalty, in Featherstone Rovers' 17–12 victory over Barrow in the 1966–67 Challenge Cup Final during the 1966–67 season at Wembley Stadium, London on Saturday 13 May 1967, in front of a crowd of 76,290. He played loose forward in Featherstone Rovers' 9–12 defeat by Hull F.C. in the 1969–70 Yorkshire Cup Final during the 1969–70 season at Headingley, Leeds on Saturday 20 September 1969.

== Coaching career ==
During the 1972–73 Northern Rugby Football League season Smales was the coach in Dewsbury's 22–13 victory over Leeds in the Championship Final at Odsal Stadium, Bradford on Saturday 19 May 1973. Smales was the coach of Batley from June 1979 to October 1981.
