= Alan Rhodes (rugby league) =

English RL coach & former rugby league footballer

Personal information
- Full name: Alan Rhodes
- Born: 1947 (age 77–78); Castleford, West Yorkshire, England

Playing information
- Position: Prop, Second-row
Club
Years	Team	Pld	T	G	FG	P
1968–75	Featherstone Rovers	153+37	53	1	0	161
1974–75	Castleford	13	2	0	0	6
1975–80	York	115+6	25	0	0	75
1981–82	Doncaster	38	2	0	0	6
1984–≥84	Sheffield Eagles
	Total	362	82	1	0	248

Coaching information
Club
Years	Team	Gms	W	D	L	W%
1981–82	Doncaster
1984–≥84	Sheffield Eagles
	Total	0	0	0	0

Alan Rhodes (born c. 1947) is a former professional rugby league footballer who played in the 1960s, 1970s and 1980s, and coached in the 1980s. He played at club level for Featherstone Rovers, Castleford, York (captain), Doncaster, and the Sheffield Eagles, as a prop, or second-row, and coached at club level for Doncaster, and the Sheffield Eagles.

== Background ==
Alan Rhodes was a pupil at Castleford Grammar School during the 1960s, he was in the same school year as the rugby league footballer; Roger Millward.

== Playing career ==
Alan Rhodes signed for Featherstone Rovers on Thursday 30 November 1967, he made his début for Featherstone Rovers on Saturday 2 March 1968, he played his last match for Featherstone Rovers during the 1974–75 season, he made his début for York on Sunday 7 September 1975, and he played his last match for York on Sunday 20 April 1980.

=== Challenge Cup Final appearances ===
Alan Rhodes played at second-row (replaced by substitute Barry Hollis) in Featherstone Rovers' 33-14 victory over Bradford Northern in the 1973 Challenge Cup Final during the 1972–73 season at Wembley Stadium, London on Saturday 12 May 1973, in front of a crowd of 72,395, and played at second-row (replaced by substitute David Busfield) in the 9-24 defeat by Warrington in the 1974 Challenge Cup Final during the 1973–74 season at Wembley Stadium, London on Saturday 11 May 1974, in front of a crowd of 77,400.

=== County Cup Final appearances ===
Alan Rhodes played at second-row in Featherstone Rovers' 7-23 defeat by Leeds in the 1970 Yorkshire Cup Final during the 1970–71 season at Odsal Stadium, Bradford on Saturday 21 November 1970, and played at second-row, and was captain in York's 8-18 defeat by Bradford Northern in the 1978 Yorkshire Cup Final during the 1978–79 season at Headingley, Leeds on Saturday 28 October 1978, this was York's first major final since the 1936–37 Yorkshire Cup Final, a period of 39-years, 2017 marked 39-years since the 1978 Yorkshire County Cup Final, meaning this was York's only major final in the last 78-years.

=== Notable tour matches ===
Alan Rhodes played in York's 2-29 defeat by Australia at Clarence Street, York on Tuesday 14 November 1978, under temporary floodlights.
