= Carl Dooler =

GB international rugby league footballer

Personal information
- Full name: Carl Dooler
- Born: 30 March 1943 Sharlston, Wakefield, England
- Died: 29 July 2010 (aged 67) North Shields, England

Playing information
- Position: Scrum-half
Club
Years	Team	Pld	T	G	FG	P
1960–69	Featherstone Rovers	199	62	15	0	216
1969–≥69	Hull Kingston Rovers	18	1	3	0	9
1973	York
1974	Batley
	Total	217	63	18	0	225
Representative
Years	Team	Pld	T	G	FG	P
1962–67	Yorkshire	5	1	0	0	3
1966	Great Britain	0
- Relatives: Vaughan Thomas (cousin)

Carl Dooler (30 March 1943 – 29 July 2010) was an English professional rugby league footballer who played in the 1960s and 1970s. He played at representative level for Great Britain (non-Test matches), and Yorkshire, and at club level for Sharlston Rovers ARLFC, Featherstone Rovers, Hull Kingston Rovers, York and Batley, as an occasional goal-kicking scrum-half.

== Background ==
Carl Dooler was born in Sharlston, West Riding of Yorkshire, England on 30 March 1943. He worked as a miner, construction worker c. 1967, and a rigger, and he died aged 67 in North Shields, Tyne and Wear.

== Playing career ==
=== Club career ===
Dooler made his début for Featherstone Rovers on Saturday 3 December 1960.

Dooler played scrum-half, scored a drop goal, and was man of the match winning the Lance Todd Trophy in Featherstone Rovers' 17–12 victory over Barrow in the 1966–67 Challenge Cup Final during the 1966–67 season at Wembley Stadium, London on Saturday 13 May 1967, in front of a crowd of 76,290.

Dooler played scrum-half and was sent off for tripping an opponent (later found not guilty by the disciplinary panel) in Featherstone Rovers' 12–25 defeat by Hull Kingston Rovers in the 1966–67 Yorkshire Cup Final during the 1966–67 season at Headingley, Leeds on Saturday 15 October 1966.

Carl Dooler is a Featherstone Rovers Hall of Fame inductee.

=== Representative honours ===
Carl Dooler represented Great Britain while at Featherstone Rovers on the 1966 Great Britain Lions tour in 15 non-Test matches.

Carl Dooler won caps for Yorkshire while at Featherstone Rovers; during the 1962–63 season against Cumberland and Lancashire, and during the 1967–68 season against Australia.

== Genealogical information ==
Carl Dooler was the cousin of the rugby league footballer; Vaughan Thomas.
