= Vaughan Thomas (rugby league) =

English rugby league footballer

Personal information
- Full name: Vaughan Thomas
- Born: second ¼ 1945 (age 80–81) Wakefield district, England

Playing information
- Position: Wing
Club
Years	Team	Pld	T	G	FG	P
1964–68	Featherstone Rovers	108	35	0	0	105
1968–69	Bradford Northern	20	3	0	0	9
	Total	128	38	0	0	114
Representative
Years	Team	Pld	T	G	FG	P
1965	Great Britain U-24	1	0	0	0	0
- Relatives: Carl Dooler (cousin)

Vaughan Thomas (birth registered second ¼ 1945) is an English former professional rugby league footballer who played in the 1960s. He played at club level for Featherstone Rovers, and Bradford Northern, as a wing.

== Background ==
Vaughan Thomas' birth was registered in Wakefield district, West Riding of Yorkshire, England.

== Playing career ==
Thomas made his début for Featherstone Rovers on Saturday 14 March 1964.

Thomas played on the wing and scored a try in Featherstone Rovers' 17–12 victory over Barrow in the 1966–67 Challenge Cup Final during the 1966–67 season at Wembley Stadium, London on Saturday 13 May 1967, in front of a crowd of 76,290.

He was forced to retire in September 1969 due to a knee injury.

== Personal life ==
Vaughan Thomas is the cousin of the rugby league footballer; Carl Dooler.
