= Christopher N. Harding =

Sports owner, investor, and philanthropist

Christopher N. Harding (born January 28, 1973) is a sports owner, investor, and philanthropist. Harding is a co-founder and co-owner of Racing Louisville FC, and co-owner of Louisville City FC. He also founded a charity Flew The Coop supporting non-profits rescuing dogs.

== Biography ==
Christopher N. Harding was born in Louisville, Kentucky. He earned his Bachelor of Business Administration and Finance degree from the University of Kentucky.

In 2018, Harding became a co-owner of the award-winning Hodges Bay Resort and Spa in Antigua where he commissioned art installations and large-scale murals. In May 2021, Harding installed a 22-foot Boonji Spaceman sculpture created by contemporary artist, Brendan Murphy.

In 2021, Harding connected Hodges Bay with his own animal rescue initiative, Flew The Coop, making it a known Caribbean animal rescue place.

In 2023, together with Murphy, Harding also launched Fast Sneaks, a sneaker company.

Harding owns a controlling stake in Soccer Holdings, Inc., the parent company of Louisville City FC, Racing Louisville FC, and the Lynn Family Stadium.

== Personal life ==
In 2021, Christopher N. Harding moved to Puerto Rico with his partner Danielle Sandhu, and in 2022, they had their first daughter, Gisela Wilde Harding.
