= Cyril Kellett =

English rugby league footballer

Personal information
- Full name: Cyril Kellett
- Born: 27 April 1937 Purston Jaglin, Featherstone, England
- Died: 21 March 1993 (aged 55) Castleford, England

Playing information
- Position: Fullback
Club
Years	Team	Pld	T	G	FG	P
1956–68	Hull Kingston Rovers	382	35	1192	0	2489
1968–74	Featherstone Rovers	171	15	557	0	1159
	Total	553	50	1749	0	3648
Representative
Years	Team	Pld	T	G	FG	P
1961–65	Yorkshire	6	0	12	0	24
- Relatives: Brian Kellett (son)

Cyril Kellett (27 April 1937 – 21 March 1993) was an English professional rugby league footballer who played in the 1950s, 1960s and 1970s, and coached in the 1970s. He played at representative level for Hull XIII (a team composed of players from both Hull F.C. and Hull Kingston Rovers), and at club level for Willow Park ARLFC (Harewood Avenue, Pontefract), Hull Kingston Rovers and Featherstone Rovers (captain), as a right-footed goal-kicking fullback and coached at club level for Bradford Northern (A-Team) from 1978.

== Background ==
Cyril Kellett was born in Purston Jaglin, Featherstone, West Riding of Yorkshire, England, he worked at Ackton Hall colliery in Featherstone.

== Playing career ==
=== Hull Kingston Rovers ===
Kellett played in Hull XIII's 17-6 victory over New Zealand at The Boulevard, Hull during October 1961, in front of a crowd of 12,000.

Kellett played fullback and scored two goals in Hull Kingston Rovers' 13–10 victory over Huddersfield in the Eastern Division Championship Final during the 1962–63 season at Headingley, Leeds on Saturday 10 November 1962.

Kellett played fullback and scored a goal in Hull Kingston Rovers' 5-13 defeat by Widnes in the 1963–64 Challenge Cup Final during the 1963–64 season at Wembley Stadium, London on Saturday 9 May 1964, in front of a crowd of 84,488.

Kellett played fullback, and scored a goal in Hull Kingston Rovers' 2-12 defeat by Hunslet in the 1962 Yorkshire Cup Final during the 1962–63 season at Headingley, Leeds on Saturday 27 October 1962, played fullback, and was man of the match winning the White Rose Trophy in the 25-12 victory over Featherstone Rovers in the 1966 Yorkshire Cup Final during the 1966–67 season at Headingley, Leeds on Saturday 15 October 1966, played fullback, and scored a goal in the 8-7 victory over Hull F.C. in the 1967 Yorkshire Cup Final during the 1967–68 season at Headingley, Leeds on Saturday 14 October 1967.

=== Featherstone Rovers ===
Kellett made his début for Featherstone Rovers Saturday 20 January 1968.

He played fullback, and scored three goals in Featherstone Rovers' 9-12 defeat by Hull F.C. in the 1969 Yorkshire Cup Final during the 1969–70 season at Headingley, Leeds on Saturday 20 September 1969, and played fullback, and scored two goals in the 7-23 defeat by Leeds in the 1970 Yorkshire Cup Final during the 1970–71 season at Odsal Stadium, Bradford on Saturday 21 November 1970.

He played fullback, and scored a record eight goals (from eight attempts) in a Challenge Cup final in Featherstone Rovers' 33-14 victory over Bradford Northern in the 1973 Challenge Cup Final during the 1972–73 season at Wembley Stadium, London on Saturday 12 May 1973, in front of a crowd of 72,395. Despite playing in the semi-final, he missed the 9-24 defeat by Warrington in the 1974 Challenge Cup Final during the 1973–74 season on Saturday 11 May 1974, in front of a crowd of in front of a crowd of 77,400, with Harold Box playing as a fullback.

Kellett's record eight goals in a Challenge Cup final, was equalled by Iestyn Harris in Leeds Rhinos' 52-16 victory over London Broncos in the 1999 Challenge Cup Final.

Kellett played in Featherstone Rovers' 0-4 defeat by Warrington in the Captain Morgan Trophy Final during the 1973-74 season at The Willows, Salford on Saturday 26 January 1974.

=== Career records ===
Kellett holds Hull Kingston Rovers' "most goals in a career" record with 1192 goals, and "most points in a career" record with 2489 points. He also set Featherstone Rovers' "most goals in a season" record with 139 goals in the 1972–73 season, a figure since extended by Steve Quinn, and subsequently by Jamie Rooney. He is third on Featherstone Rovers' "most goals in a career" record list behind Quinn, and Stuart Dickens. As of 2013, he is third on British rugby league's "most goals in a career" record list behind Neil Fox and Jim Sullivan, and as of 2015, with 3686 points; and is seventh on British rugby league's "most points in a career" record list behind Neil Fox, Jim Sullivan, Kevin Sinfield, Gus Risman, John Woods and Mick Nanyn.

== Honoured at Featherstone Rovers ==
Cyril Kellett is a Featherstone Rovers Hall of Fame inductee.

== Personal life ==
Cyril Kellett was the father of the rugby league footballer who played in the 1980s; Brian Kellett, and the older brother of rugby league footballer David Kellett.

Kellett was diagnosed with Alzheimer's disease in later life, and moved to a nursing home in 1990. He died on 21 March 1993 at Hightown Hospital, Castleford.
