= 1972–73 Challenge Cup =

Rugby league competition

- Highest attendance: 72,395
- Broadcast partners: BBC
- Winners: Featherstone Rovers
- Runners-up: Bradford Northern
- Lance Todd Trophy: Steve Nash

The 1972–73 Challenge Cup was the 72nd staging of rugby league's oldest knockout competition, the Challenge Cup.

The final was contested by Featherstone Rovers and Bradford Northern at Wembley.

Featherstone Rovers beat Bradford Northern 33-14 at Wembley in front of a crowd of 72,395.

The winner of the Lance Todd Trophy was the Featherstone scrum-half, Steve Nash.

Cyril Kellett scored 8-conversions for Featherstone Rovers, the most in a Challenge Cup final until it was equalled by Iestyn Harris in 1999.

== First round ==
Date	Team one	Team two	Score
26 Jan	St Helens	Doncaster	41-0
27 Jan	Castleford	Swinton	13-9
27 Jan	Huddersfield	Hull Kingston Rovers	6-19
27 Jan	Huyton	Wakefield Trinity	6-18
27 Jan	Leeds	Wigan	11-25
27 Jan	Millom	Hunslet	5-18
28 Jan	Bradford Northern	Whitehaven	17-4
28 Jan	Bramley	Dewsbury	8-11
28 Jan	Featherstone Rovers	Salford	18-11
28 Jan	Halifax	Warrington	4-7
28 Jan	Hull FC	Batley	11-6
28 Jan	Keighley	Rochdale Hornets	8-44
28 Jan	Leigh	Dewsbury Celtic	27-4
28 Jan	Oldham	Barrow	24-7
30 Jan	Widnes	Blackpool	53-3
30 Jan	York	Workington Town	19-24

== Second round ==
Date	Team one	Team two	Score
17 Feb	Hull FC	Oldham	2-24
17 Feb	Leigh	Wakefield Trinity	0-5
17 Feb	Workington Town	Dewsbury	8-10
18 Feb	Bradford Northern	Hull Kingston Rovers	13-8
18 Feb	Featherstone Rovers	Rochdale Hornets	30-19
18 Feb	Hunslet	Castleford	0-39
18 Feb	Warrington	Widnes	20-8
18 Feb	Wigan	St Helens	15-2

== Quarter-finals ==
Date	Team one	Team two	Score
03 Mar	Castleford	Oldham	25-11
04 Mar	Bradford Northern	Wigan	11-7
04 Mar	Dewsbury	Wakefield Trinity	16-4
04 Mar	Warrington	Featherstone Rovers	14-18

== Semi-finals ==
Date	Team one	Team two	Score
07 Apr	Bradford Northern	Dewsbury	23-7
14 Apr	Featherstone Rovers	Castleford	17-3

== Final ==
12 May 1973

Featherstone Rovers	33 – 14	Bradford Northern
Try: Newlove (2), Farrar, Smith, Hartley; Goal: Kellett (8); Drop goal: Nash	Report	Try: Redfearn, Fearnley; Goal: Tees (4)

Wembley, London
Attendance: 72,395
Referee: M. J. Naughton (Widnes)
Player of the Match: Steve Nash

1	Cyril Kellett
2	Paul Coventry
3	Michael Smith (substituted off)
4	John Newlove (c)
5	Ken Kellett
6	Mel Mason
7	Steve Nash
8	Les Tonks
9	John Keith Bridges
10	Vince Farrar
11	Alan Rhodes (substituted off)
12	James "Jimmy" Thompson
13	Charlie Stone
Substitutes:
14	David "Dave" Hartley (substituted in)
15	Barry Hollis (substituted in)
Coach:
Peter Fox

1	Eddie Tees
2	Mike Lamb
3	Dave Stockwell
4	Bernard Watson (c)
5	David Redfearn
6	Mike Blacker (substituted off)
7	Barry Seabourne
8	Brian Hogan
9	Peter Dunn
10	Kelvin Earl (substituted off)
11	Graham Joyce
12	Bill Pattinson
13	Stanley Fearnley
Substitutes:
14	Arnie Long (substituted in)
15	David Treasure (substituted in)
Coach:
Ian Brooke
