= Laurie Gant =

English coach and former rugby league footballer (1922–2004)

Personal information
- Full name: Laurence Gant MBE
- Born: 21 July 1922 Wakefield, England
- Died: 19 October 2004 (aged 82) Wakefield, England

Playing information
- Height: 5 ft 7.5 in (1.715 m)
- Weight: 14 st 9 lb (93 kg)
- Position: Second-row
Club
Years	Team	Pld	T	G	FG	P
1948–53	Featherstone Rovers	112	15	1	0	47

Coaching information
Club
Years	Team	Gms	W	D	L	W%
1966–70	Featherstone Rovers	171	100	7	74	58
1973	York
	Total	171	100	7	74	58

Laurence Gant MBE (21 July 1922 – 19 October 2004) was an English professional rugby league footballer who played as a second-row forward in the 1940s and 1950s, coached in the 1960s and 1970s, and refereed in the 1950s and 1960s.

He played at club level for Wakefield Trinity (A-Team), and Featherstone Rovers, and coached at club level for Stanley Rangers ARLFC, Featherstone Rovers and York. Laurie Gant was the president of St Michael's Cricket club , and the Wakefield branch of the Royal British Legion.

== Background ==
Laurie Gant was born in Wakefield, West Riding of Yorkshire, England, he worked as a cobbler in Wrenthorpe, in the 1981 New Year Honours, Gant was appointed a Member of the Order of the British Empire (MBE) for his services to rugby league, and he died aged 82 in Wakefield, West Yorkshire, England.

== Playing career ==
=== Challenge Cup Final appearances ===
Laurie Gant played at second-row in Featherstone Rovers' 12–18 defeat by Workington Town in the 1951–52 Challenge Cup Final during the 1951–52 season at Wembley Stadium, London on Saturday 19 April 1952, in front of a crowd of 72,093, he played despite having pneumonia, but following massage with brandy and rum.

=== Club career ===
Laurie Gant made his début for Featherstone Rovers on Monday 29 March 1948.

== Coaching career ==
=== Challenge Cup Final appearances ===
Laurie Gant was the coach in Featherstone Rovers' 17–12 victory over Barrow in the 1966–67 Challenge Cup Final during the 1966–67 season at Wembley Stadium, London on Saturday 13 May 1967, in front of a crowd of 76,290. This was the first Challenge Cup final attended by Elizabeth II and Prince Philip, Duke of Edinburgh.

=== County Cup Final appearances ===
Laurie Gant was the coach in Featherstone Rovers' 9–12 defeat by Hull F.C. in the 1969–70 Yorkshire Cup Final during the 1969–70 season at Headingley, Leeds on Saturday 20 September 1969, and the 7–23 defeat by Leeds in the 1970–71 Yorkshire Cup Final during the 1970–71 season at Odsal, Bradford on Saturday 21 November 1970.
