= Richard Newlove =

English rugby league footballer

Personal information
- Full name: Richard Newlove
- Born: 18 July 1978 (age 48) Pontefract, Yorkshire, England

Playing information
- Position: Wing, Centre
Club
Years	Team	Pld	T	G	FG	P
1995–02	Featherstone Rovers	109	65	0	0	264
2003	Wakefield Trinity Wildcats	23	8	0	0	32
2004–05	Featherstone Rovers	3	5	0	0	20
2006	Doncaster	1	0	0	0	0
2007	Sheffield Eagles	1	0	0	0	0
	Total	137	78	0	0	316
- Father: John Newlove
- Relatives: Paul Newlove (brother); Charlie Stone (uncle)

Richard Newlove is an English former professional rugby league footballer who played in the 1990s and 2000s. He played at club level for Featherstone Rovers (two spells), Wakefield Trinity Wildcats, Doncaster and the Sheffield Eagles. He played on the wing.

== Playing career ==
=== Club career ===
Richard Newlove made his début for Featherstone Rovers on Sunday 3 September 1995.

== Genealogical information ==
Richard Newlove is the youngest son of the rugby league footballer John Newlove, and is the youngest brother of the rugby league footballers; Shaun Newlove and Paul Newlove.
