= Brian Kellett =

English rugby league footballer

Personal information
- Born: fourth ¼ 1959 (age 65–66); Hemsworth district, Wakefield, England

Playing information
- Position: Fullback, Wing
Club
Years	Team	Pld	T	G	FG	P
1986–86/87	Featherstone Rovers	11+7	2	0	0	8
≤1989–≥89	Mansfield Marksman
	Total	18	2	0	0	8
- Father: Cyril Kellett

Brian Kellett is an English former professional rugby league footballer who played in the 1980s. He played at club level for Featherstone Rovers, and Mansfield Marksman, as a fullback, or wing.

== Club career ==
Brian Kellett made his début for Featherstone Rovers on Sunday 19 January 1986, and he played his last match for Featherstone Rovers during the 1986–87 season.
