= Billy Harris (rugby league) =

English rugby league footballer

Personal information
- Full name: George William Harris
- Born: second ¼ 1951 (age 73–74); Pontefract district

Playing information
- Position: Prop
Club
Years	Team	Pld	T	G	FG	P
1972–75	Featherstone Rovers	86+7	12	3	0	42
1980–81	York	1	0	0	0	0
1980–81	Oldham	20	0	0	0	0
1981–84	Wakefield Trinity	59	2	0	0	6
1984–86	Sheffield Eagles	45	4	0	0	16
1986–88	Batley	18	0	0	0	0
	Total	236	18	3	0	64
- Relatives: Graham Harris (brother)

George William "Billy" Harris (birth registered during second ¼ 1951) is an English former professional rugby league footballer who played in the 1970s and 1980s. He played at club level for Featherstone Rovers, Oldham and Wakefield Trinity, as a prop.

== Playing career ==
=== Challenge Cup Final appearances ===
Billy Harris played at prop in Featherstone Rovers' 9–24 defeat by Warrington in the 1974 Challenge Cup Final during the 1973–74 season at Wembley Stadium, London on Saturday 11 May 1974, in front of a crowd of 77,400.

=== Club career ===
Billy Harris made his début for Featherstone Rovers on Sunday 3 September 1972.

== Genealogical information ==
Billy Harris is the younger brother of the rugby league footballer; Graham Harris.
