= Paul Newlove =

Great Britain & England international rugby league footballer

Personal information
- Born: 10 August 1971 (age 55) Pontefract, West Riding of Yorkshire, England

Playing information
- Position: Centre
Club
Years	Team	Pld	T	G	FG	P
1988–93	Featherstone Rovers	150	122	9	0	506
1993–95	Bradford Northern	70	66	0	0	264
1995–03	St Helens	208	134	0	0	536
2003–04	Castleford Tigers	5	1	0	0	4
	Total	433	323	9	0	1310
Representative
Years	Team	Pld	T	G	FG	P
1989	Yorkshire	1	2	0	0	8
1992–01	England	7	7	0	0	28
1989–98	Great Britain	20	9	0	0	36
- Father: John Newlove
- Relatives: Richard Newlove (brother); Charlie Stone (uncle)

Paul Newlove (born 10 August 1971) is an English former professional rugby league footballer who played in the 1980s, 1990s and 2000s.

He played as a centre, for Featherstone Rovers, Bradford Northern, St Helens and Castleford Tigers. He also won 20 international caps for Great Britain, and 7 caps for England, including at the 1995 Rugby League World Cup.

== Background ==
Newlove was born in Pontefract, West Riding of Yorkshire, England.

== Playing career ==
=== Featherstone Rovers ===
Newlove made his début for Featherstone Rovers on Tuesday 27 September 1988, he later played at centre in Featherstone Rovers' 14-20 defeat by Bradford Northern in the 1989 Yorkshire Cup Final during the 1989–90 season at Headingley, Leeds on Sunday 5 November 1989. He moved on to play for Bradford Northern five years later.

Newlove played at centre and scored two tries in Featherstone Rovers' 20–16 victory over Workington Town in the 1992–93 Divisional Premiership Final at Old Trafford, Manchester on 19 May 1993. Newlove scored a total of 48 tries during the season – a club record.

=== Bradford Northern ===
Bradford Northern paid £245,000 for Paul Newlove when he moved from Featherstone Rovers in 1993 (based on increases in average earnings, this would be approximately £486,900 in 2013). The transfer of Paul Newlove to St. Helens from the Bradford Bulls is still one of the most expensive rugby league transfers.

=== St Helens ===
St. Helens on 29 November 1995 paid Bradford Northern £250,000 cash (based on increases in average earnings, this would be approximately £464,900 in 2013), and also sent Sonny Nickle, Bernard Dwyer and Paul Loughlin to Bradford Northern. Newlove played for St Helens at centre in their 1996 Challenge Cup Final victory over Bradford Bulls. At the end of Super League's first season, Newlove was the season's top try scorer and was named at centre in the 1996 Super League Dream Team. Newlove played for St. Helens at centre in their 1999 Super League Grand Final victory over Bradford Bulls.

Newlove played at centre and scored a try in St. Helens' 16-25 defeat by Wigan in the 1995–96 Regal Trophy Final during the 1995–96 at Alfred McAlpine Stadium, Huddersfield on Saturday 13 January 1996.

Having won the 1999 Championship St. Helens contested in the 2000 World Club Challenge against National Rugby League Premiers the Melbourne Storm, with Newlove playing at centre in the loss. As Super League V champions, St. Helens played against 2000 NRL Premiers, the Brisbane Broncos in the 2001 World Club Challenge. Newlove played at centre in Saints' victory. Newlove had spent nine seasons at St. Helens, lifting many trophies throughout a successful Knowsley Road career. Newlove played for St. Helens at centre in their 2002 Super League Grand Final victory against the Bradford Bulls. He joined Castleford Tigers in 2003, but made only five appearances for the club before retiring in May 2004 due to a recurring foot injury.

=== Representative career ===
Newlove made his international debut on 21 October 1989, becoming Great Britain's youngest ever debutant (18 years and 72 days old) when he appeared as a substitute against New Zealand at Old Trafford. Newlove appeared for Yorkshire while at Featherstone Rovers; during the 1989–90 season against Lancashire.

Newlove represented Great Britain in 1991 and in 1992 against Papua New Guinea (sub); he was selected to go on the 1992 Great Britain Lions tour of Australia and New Zealand playing three matches against Australia and one against New Zealand; in 1993 against France. Newlove also won caps for England while at Featherstone Rovers in 1992 against Wales.

He played for Great Britain while at Bradford Northern in 1993 against New Zealand (3 matches), in 1994 against France, Australia, and Australia (sub), while at St. Helens in 1997 against Australia (SL) (3 matches), and in 1998 against New Zealand. He played for England while at Bradford Northern in 1995 against Wales, Australia (2 matches), Fiji, and Wales.

In 1994, Newlove briefly retired from international rugby following a dispute over his withdrawal from the Rugby League World Sevens tournament, but was recalled to the Test side after making amends.

Newlove was selected to play for England in the 1995 World Cup Final at centre, scoring a try in the loss against Australia.

He played for England while at St. Helens in 1996 against France. In the 1997 post season, Newlove was selected to play for Great Britain at centre in all three matches of the Super League Test series against Australia.

Newlove withdrew from the England squad prior to the 2000 Rugby League World Cup.

Newlove retired from international duty in 2001.

== Honoured at Featherstone Rovers ==
Newlove is a Featherstone Rovers Hall of Fame inductee.

== Personal life ==
Newlove is from a family of rugby league players. He is the middle son of John Newlove, the younger brother of Shaun Newlove who played in the 1980s and 1990s for Featherstone Rovers, and the older brother of Richard Newlove.

Achievements
Preceded by Martin Offiah	Rugby league transfer record Bradford Bulls to St. Helens; 1995–2006	Succeeded by Stuart Fielden
