= 1966–67 Challenge Cup =

Rugby league competition

- Duration: 5 rounds
- Winners: Featherstone Rovers
- Runners-up: Barrow
- Lance Todd Trophy: Carl Dooler

The 1966–67 Challenge Cup was the 66th staging of rugby league's oldest knockout competition, the Challenge Cup.

== First round ==
Date	Team one	Score one	Team two	Score two
03 Feb	Salford	5	St Helens	5
04 Feb	B.O.C.M (Hull)	9	Liverpool City	20
04 Feb	Batley	10	Keighley	6
04 Feb	Blackbrook	12	York	23
04 Feb	Bradford Northern	8	Featherstone Rovers	15
04 Feb	Dewsbury	9	Workington Town	5
04 Feb	Doncaster	14	Bramley	11
04 Feb	Huddersfield	7	Oldham	12
04 Feb	Hull FC	24	Halifax	11
04 Feb	Hull Kingston Rovers	18	Rochdale Hornets	2
04 Feb	Hunslet	2	Wakefield Trinity	28
04 Feb	Leeds	15	Blackpool	3
04 Feb	Leigh	8	Castleford	10
04 Feb	Swinton	16	Widnes	7
04 Feb	Warrington	19	Wigan	19
04 Feb	Whitehaven	2	Barrow	8
07 Feb	St Helens	3	Salford	8
08 Feb	Wigan	20	Warrington	3

== Second round ==
Date	Team one	Score one	Team two	Score two
25 Feb	Barrow	8	Liverpool City	4
25 Feb	Batley	0	Swinton	22
25 Feb	Featherstone Rovers	11	Wakefield Trinity	7
25 Feb	Hull Kingston Rovers	9	Castleford	9
25 Feb	Oldham	4	Leeds	13
25 Feb	Wigan	6	Salford	18
25 Feb	York	10	Hull FC	15
28 Feb	Doncaster	4	Dewsbury	10
01 Mar	Castleford	13	Hull Kingston Rovers	6

== Quarter-finals ==
Date	Team one	Score one	Team two	Score two
18 Mar	Dewsbury	9	Salford	7
18 Mar	Featherstone Rovers	8	Castleford	7
18 Mar	Hull FC	5	Barrow	6
18 Mar	Leeds	17	Swinton	15

== Semi-finals ==
Date	Team one	Score one	Team two	Score two
01 Apr	Featherstone Rovers	16	Leeds	8
08 Apr	Barrow	14	Dewsbury	9

== Final ==
In the Challenge Cup final Featherstone Rovers faced Barrow, who were captain-coached by Jim Challinor at Wembley Stadium on Saturday 13 May 1967 in front of a crowd of 76,290.

Featherstone Rovers won 17-12 and it was their first Cup final win in two final appearances.

13 May 1967

Featherstone Rovers	17 – 12	Barrow
Try Morgan, Thomas, Smales; Goals Smales (2); Pen Smales (1); DG Dooler (1)	Report	Try Brophy, Watson; Goals Tees, Delooze; Pen Delooze (1)

Wembley, London
Attendance: 76,290
Referee: Eric Clay (Leeds)
Player of the Match: Carl Dooler

1	Brian Wrigglesworth
2	Vaughan Thomas
3	Keith Cotton
4	Gary Jordan
5	Ken Greatorex
6	Michael Smith
7	Carl Dooler
8	Les Tonks
9	Graham Harris
10	Malcolm Dixon (c)
11	Arnie Morgan
12	Jimmy Thompson
13	Tommy Smales
Coach:
Laurie Gant

1	Eddie Tees
2	Bill Burgess
3	Jim Challinor (c)
4	Harry Hughes
5	Michael Murray
6	Tom Brophy
7	Ged Smith
8	Ivor Kelland
9	Maurice Redhead
10	Ray Hopwood
11	Mike Sanderson
12	Henry Delooze
13	Mike Watson
Coach:
Jim Challinor
