= Steve Lyons (rugby league) =

English rugby league footballer

Personal information
- Full name: Steve Lyons
- Born: Leeds, Yorkshire, England

Playing information
- Position: Prop
Club
Years	Team	Pld	T	G	FG	P
1966–71	Featherstone Rovers	119	12	0	0	36
1971–≥71	Wakefield Trinity	78	10	0	0	30
	club(s) in Australia
1974–≥74	Hull Kingston Rovers	53+3	6	0	0	18
1980–81	Huddersfield	26	1	0	0	3
1981–82	Wakefield Trinity	5	0	0	0	0
	Total	284	29	0	0	87
Representative
Years	Team	Pld	T	G	FG	P
1973	Yorkshire	1	1	0	0	3

Steve Lyons is a former professional rugby league footballer who played in the 1970s and 1980s. He played at representative level for Yorkshire, and at club level for Wakefield Trinity (two spells), for club(s) in Australia, Hull Kingston Rovers and Huddersfield, as a prop.

== Playing career ==
Steve Lyons made his début for Wakefield Trinity during September 1971, and he played his last match in his second spell for Wakefield Trinity during the 1981–82 season.

=== County honours ===
Steve Lyons won cap(s) for Yorkshire while at Wakefield Trinity.

=== Player's No.6 Trophy Final appearances ===
Steve Lyons played prop in Wakefield Trinity's 11–22 defeat by Halifax in the 1971–72 Player's No.6 Trophy Final during the 1971–72 season at Odsal Stadium, Bradford, on Saturday 22 January 1972.
