= Benefit season =

Historical Overview
- Period: 18th and 19th centuries
- Setting: British and American theatre
- Primary goal: Supplementing actor salaries through ticket sales

Mechanics
- Participants: Actors, playwrights, box-keepers, and musicians
- Frequency: Usually once per season for major performers
- Success factors: Personal popularity, choice of play, "bespeak" patronage

Legacy
- Replaced by: Fixed high salaries, royalties, and residuals

A benefit season is a method of financially rewarding professional cricketers that is used by English county cricket teams to compensate long serving players.

The system originated in the 19th century to help out professional cricketers who were paid low wages and generally could not play professional cricket much beyond the age of forty. Early "benefits" typically comprised the gate receipts of a designated match. Nowadays, a benefit season comprises a sequence of events such as dinners and auctions of memorabilia over the course of the summer cricket season or the whole year in which the relevant cricket season falls. In almost all cases only one player from a club is given a benefit in each season in order to avoid two or more players competing to attract money from the same people. Until recently, players with less service might sometimes be given a "Testimonial" season or match: the difference appears to have been largely semantic, but for almost half a century one of the less financially sound English first-class county clubs, Derbyshire, made a point of not awarding benefits, but giving testimonials instead. The Australian cricketer Colin McCool was awarded a testimonial in 1959, only three years after joining Somerset.

The player will appoint a "benefit" committee to help him organise his benefit, composed of other current and former cricketers, and any business and professional people with relevant skills and contacts who are willing to help out. All the profits go to the player and they are exempt from tax following the ruling of the House of Lords over the benefit for James Seymour, the Kent cricketer whose benefit in 1920 was the subject of a protracted legal case brought by the Inland Revenue and not fully resolved until 1926.

A player may be rewarded with a benefit season by his county committee about ten years after receiving his county cap, but this varies from player to player, partly because in order for his benefit to qualify for tax exemption a player must not have had a contractual expectation of a benefit. Occasionally a player stays with a county long enough to be awarded a second benefit. Sometimes this is also known as a "testimonial": an example is Graham Gooch of Essex who had a benefit in 1985 and a testimonial in 1995.

The system has survived into the 21st century even though county cricketers are now reasonably well paid. The amounts raised generally vary from a few tens of thousands of pounds to low six figures. A few players (such as Graeme Hick) have made over three hundred thousand pounds. The amount that a player makes from his benefit depends on factors such as his personal popularity, contacts, social skills and fame at least as much as on his degree of financial need and the quality of his contribution to his club on the pitch. One aspect of this which attracts particular scepticism is that famous international cricketers, some of whom will retire as millionaires in any case, tend to make more out of their benefit season than less well off players who have never played for their country, and who seem closer to the being the kind of "deserving cause" for whom benefits were first devised. The supporters of the system contend that it brings about two million pounds a year into the English game which would otherwise be lost if the system were to be abandoned.

Since the 1990s the proportion of cricketers who move from one county club to another during their playing career has been rising sharply, and many players who do so never receive a benefit. However, salaries have risen sharply in recent years, and many players prefer to hunt for a better salary rather than stay where they are in the hope of being awarded a benefit at some point. A conventional pension scheme for cricketers has also been introduced to complement the benefit system.

If a county has no player in its squad who is eligible for a benefit but has not yet had one, it may organise a "county benefit" or a "youth cricket benefit" to raise funds for special projects, but these often do not raise much money as many people are more interested in taking part in a benefit if they know that they are helping an individual.

Tax exempt events to raise money for long serving players are also used in some other sports such as football, although they tend to be called testimonials in that case and are usually a single match rather than a season of events. The tax free status of benefits and testimonials rests on a single early 20th century legal ruling, and great care has to be taken by every benefit committee not to breach the rules in some small way which might lead to the player receiving a demand for tax on the entire amount, or to provoke the Inland Revenue into challenging the exemption on an overall basis. However, testimonials for prominent professional footballers have in modern times increasingly become charity fundraisers in which the player donates either a large part or all of the proceeds to one or more organisations.

== See also ==
- History of English amateur cricket
