= 2009 Featherstone Rovers season =

The Featherstone Rovers competed in the Co-operative Championship in 2009.

== Table ==
2009 Co-operative Championship
Pos	Team	Pld	W	D	L	PF	PA	PD	BP	Pts	Qualification
1	Barrow Raiders	20	13	0	7	632	361	+271	5	44	Qualified for the play-offs
2	Halifax	20	13	0	7	714	476	+238	4	43	Qualified for the play-offs
3	Sheffield Eagles	20	11	0	9	635	447	+188	9	42	Qualified for the play-offs
4	Widnes Vikings	20	11	0	9	649	438	+211	6	39	Qualified for the play-offs
5	Whitehaven	20	12	0	8	565	567	−2	3	39	Qualified for the play-offs
6	Featherstone Rovers	20	12	0	8	619	524	+95	1	37	Qualified for the play-offs
7	Gateshead Thunder	20	9	2	9	610	657	−47	3	32	
8	Batley Bulldogs	20	8	2	10	536	620	−84	6	32	
9	Leigh Centurions	20	9	0	11	426	572	−146	5	32	Relegated
10	Toulouse Olympique XIII	20	9	0	11	556	582	−26	3	30 (Note: Toulouse were exempt from relegation.)	
11	Doncaster	20	1	0	19	257	955	−698	−4	−1 (Note: Doncaster had 5 bonus points, but lost 9 competition points for entering administration.)	Relegated

Source: www.cooperativechampionship.co.uk and Rugby-League.com
Rules for classification: 1st on league points; 2nd on match points difference.

== 2009 fixtures and results ==
W Win D Draw L Loss

=== Co-operative Championship ===
Co-operative Championship results
Date	Round	Opponent	H/A	Venue	Result	Score	Tries	Goals	Attendance	Report
15 March	1	Batley Bulldogs	A	Mount Pleasant	W	34-8			1,127	Co-op
22 March	2	Whitehaven	H	Big Fellas Stadium	L	26-52			1,555	Co-op
10 April	4	Gateshead Thunder	A	Gateshead International Stadium	W	23-2			651	Co-op
13 April	5	Sheffield Eagles	H	Big Fellas Stadium	W	20-12			1,612	Co-op
19 April	6	Whitehaven	A	Recreation Ground	W	44-16			1,411	Co-op
23 April	7	Leigh Centurions	A	Leigh Sports Village	W	30-16			2,307	Co-op
30 April	8	Halifax	H	Big Fellas Stadium	L	26-39			2,673	Co-op
17 May	10	Doncaster	H	Big Fellas Stadium	W	68-12			1,577	Featherstone
24 May	11	Barrow Raiders	A	Craven Park	L	12-44			1,995	Featherstone
28 May	12	Leigh Centurions	H	Big Fellas Stadium	W	30-24			1,535	Featherstone
13 June	13	Widnes Vikings	A	Stobart Stadium Halton	L	22-46			3,278	Co-op
27 June	14	Toulouse Olympique	A	Stade Ernest-Argeles	W	32-16			2,321	Featherstone
5 July	15	Gateshead Thunder	H	Big Fellas Stadium	W	56-40			1,475	Featherstone
24 July	17	Halifax	A	Shay Stadium	W	22-20			2,456	Co-op
1 August	18	Toulouse Olympique	H	Big Fellas Stadium	L	18-34			1,346	RLP
9 August	19	Widnes Vikings	H	Big Fellas Stadium	W	34-29				RLP
16 August	20	Doncaster	A	Keepmoat Stadium	W	56-10				RLP
23 August	21	Barrow Raiders	H	Big Fellas Stadium	L	28-46				RLP
27 August	9	Sheffield Eagles	A	Don Valley Stadium	L	12-28				RLP
6 September	22	Batley Bulldogs	H	Big Fellas Stadium	L	26-30				RLP

Note: Featherstone had byes in rounds 3 and 16.

==== Play-offs ====
Date	Round	Opponent	H/A	Venue	Result	Score	Tries	Goals	Attendance	Live on TV	Report
11 September	Eliminators	Sheffield Eagles	A	Don Valley Stadium	W	32-8					RLP
18 September	Semi-final	Widnes Vikings	A	Stobart Stadium Halton	W	32-24					RLP
18 September	Elimination Final	Halifax	A	Shay Stadium	L	30-36					RLP

===== Team bracket =====
Eliminators
4	Widnes Vikings	26
5	Whitehaven	21
3	Sheffield Eagles	8
6	Featherstone Rovers	32

Semi-finals
1	Barrow Raiders	35
2	Halifax	12
4	Widnes Vikings	24
6	Featherstone Rovers	32

Eliminator Final
2	Halifax	36
6	Featherstone Rovers	30

Grand Final
1	Barrow Raiders	26
2	Halifax	18

Source:Rugby League Project

=== Northern Rail Cup ===
W Win L Loss

Northern Rail Cup results
Date	Round	Opponent	H/A	Venue	Result	Score	Tries	Goals	Attendance	Report
15 February	Group	Doncaster	A	Keepmoat Stadium	W	36-6			1,126	Featherstone
18 February	Group	Leigh Centurions	H	Big Fellas Stadium	W	10-6			1,487	Featherstone
22 February	Group	Dewsbury Rams	H	Big Fellas Stadium	L	26-28			1,470	Featherstone
1 March	Group	Workington Town	A	Derwent Park	W	38-6			477	Featherstone
4 June	Quarter-final	Oldham	A	Leigh Sports Village	W	32-18			853	Featherstone
18 June	Semi-final	Barrow Raiders	A	Craven Park	L	10-16			2,775	RLP

=== Challenge Cup ===
W Win L Loss

Challenge Cup results
Date	Round	Opponent	H/A	Venue	Result	Score	Tries	Goals	Attendance	Report
8 March	3	British Army	H	Big Fellas Stadium	W	94-2			1,763	Featherstone
10 May	4	Warrington Wolves	H	Big Fellas Stadium	L	8-56			3,127	Featherstone

== 2009 Squad ==
As of 25 December 2008:

No	Nat	Player	Position	Previous club
1	(England)	Tommy Saxton	Full back	Salford
2	(England)	Waine Pryce	Wing	Wakefield Trinity
3	(England)	Ian Hardman	Center	Widnes
4	(England)	Andrew "Andy" Kirk	Center	Widnes
5	(Scotland)	Jon Steel	Wing	Hull Kingston Rovers
6	(Wales)	Iestyn Harris	Stand off	Bradford Bulls
7	(England)	Andy Kain	Half back	Widnes
8	(England)	Tony Tonks	Prop	Oldham
9	(England)	Jack Lee	Hooker	Featherstone Rovers
10	(England)	Stuart Dickens (C)	Prop	Featherstone Rovers
11	(England)	Matty Dale	Second row	Hull
12	(England)	Jamie Field	Second row	Featherstone Rovers
13	(England)	Richard Blakeway	Loose forward	Featherstone Rovers
14	(Ireland)	Tom Haughey	Second row	Featherstone Rovers
15	(Scotland)	James Houston	Prop	Featherstone Rovers
16	(England)	Joe McLocklan	Hooker	Doncaster
17	(England)	Joe Hirst	Second row	Wakefield Trinity
18	(England)	Tim Spears	Second row	Batley
19	(England)	Sean Hesketh	Prop/Second Row	Doncaster
20	(England)	Stuart Kain	Full back	Gateshead Thunder
22	(England)	Matthew Handforth	Second row	
23	(England)	Gareth Swift	Loose forward	Normanton Knights
24	(England)	John Fallon	Prop	Hull Kingston Rovers
25	(England)	Scott Wilson	Wing	Featherstone Rovers
26	(England)	Sam Smeaton	Wing	Featherstone Rovers

=== 2009 transfers in ===
Nat	Name	Moved From
(England)	Ian Hardman	Widnes
(Scotland)	Jon Steel	Hull Kingston Rovers
(Wales)	Iestyn Harris	Bradford Bulls
(England)	Joe Hirst	Wakefield Trinity
(England)	Jon Fallon	Hull Kingston Rovers
(England)	Matt Dale	Hull
(England)	Tim Spears	Batley
(England)	Gareth Swift	Normanton Knights
(England)	Stuart Kain	Gateshead Thunder
(England)	Jack Lee	Castleford

=== 2009 transfers out ===
Nat	Name	Moved To
(Ireland)	Paul Handforth	Released
(England)	Loz Wildbore	Widnes
(England)	Craig Cawthray	Hunslet
(England)	Nathan Larvin	Hunslet
(England)	Nathan Batty	Released
(England)	Carl Hughes	Keighley
(England)	Kevin Eadie	Released
(England)	Ian Tonks	Dewsbury
(England)	Lee Lingard	Dewsbury
(England)	Anthony Thackray	End of Loan
(United States)	Nathan Massey	End of Loan
(England)	Wayne McHugh	York City Knights
