= 2019 Featherstone Rovers season =

- Championship Rank: 5th
- Play-off result: Lost in Final
- Challenge Cup: 5th round
- RFL 1895 Cup: 2nd round

Team information
- Chairman: Mark Campbell
- Head Coach: Ryan Carr
- Stadium: Post Office Road
List of seasons	2023 →

In the 2019 rugby league season, Featherstone Rovers competed in the RFL Championship, the Challenge Cup and the 1895 Cup. Featherstone finished fifth in the league to qualify for the play-offs where they lost 24–6 to Toronto Wolfpack in the Grand Final.

== Results ==
=== Pre-season friendlies ===
W Win D Draw L Loss

Pre-season results
Date	Round	Versus	H/A	Venue	Result	Score	Tries	Goals	Attendance	Report
5 January	Yorkshire Cup: 1	Dewsbury Rams	A	Crown Flatt	L	14–20	Hallett, McDaniel, Walters	Tansey	1,504	RLP

=== RFL Championship ===
==== League table ====
Pos	Team	Pld	W	D	L	PF	PA	PD	Pts	Qualification
1	Toronto Wolfpack	27	26	0	1	1010	356	+654	52	Play-off semi-final
2	Toulouse Olympique	27	20	0	7	877	446	+431	40	Play-off qualifying final
3	York City Knights	27	19	1	7	612	529	+83	39	Play-off qualifying final
4	Leigh Centurions	27	18	0	9	792	558	+234	36	Play-off elimination final
5	Featherstone Rovers	27	17	0	10	837	471	+366	34	Play-off elimination final
6	Bradford Bulls	27	16	1	10	717	522	+195	33	
7	Sheffield Eagles	27	15	0	12	748	694	+54	30	
8	Halifax	27	10	1	16	602	685	−83	21	
9	Swinton Lions	27	10	1	16	619	803	−184	21	
10	Batley Bulldogs	27	8	1	18	462	756	−294	17	
11	Widnes Vikings	27	14	0	13	646	586	+60	16 (Note: Widnes deducted 12 points for going into administration.)	
12	Dewsbury Rams	27	6	2	19	513	721	−208	14	
13	Barrow Raiders	27	5	1	21	479	861	−382	11	Relegated to League 1
14	Rochdale Hornets	27	1	0	26	342	1268	−926	2	Relegated to League 1

==== Championship results ====
W Win D Draw L Loss

Championship results
Date	Round	Versus	H/A	Venue	Result	Score	Tries	Goals	Attendance	Report
3 February	1	Bradford Bulls	A	Odsal Stadium	L	16–17	W. Boas, Briscoe, King	W. Boas (2)	6,025	RLP
10 February	2	Batley Bulldogs	H	Post Office Road	W	42–14	A. Boas, W. Boas, Carey, Day, King, Singleton, C. Smith, Teteh	W. Boas (5)	2,145	RLP, BBC
17 February	3	Leigh Centurions	A	Leigh Sports Village	L	20–29	W. Boas, Briscoe, Newman, D. Smith	W. Boas (2)	3,443	RLP BBC
24 February	4	Halifax R.L.F.C.	H	Post Office Road	W	46–16	Briscoe (2), Newman (2), Cooper, King, Lockwwod, Render	Turner (5), A. Boas (2)	2,534	RLP, BBC
3 March	5	Widnes Vikings	A	Halton Stadium	L	22–44	Newman (2), King, C. Smith	Turner (3)	5,782	RLP BBC
10 March	6	Sheffield Eagles	H	Post Office Road	W	32–14	Turner (2), Bussey, Davies, Golding, Lockwwod	Turner (4)	1,891	RLP, BBC
17 March	7	Swinton Lions	A	Heywood Road	W	24–12	Bussey (2), Golding, Ormondroyd	Reynolds (4)	923	RLP, BBC
24 March	8	Widnes Vikings	H	Post Office Road	L	22–32	Briscoe, Golding, King, Reynolds	Reynolds (3)	1,943	RLP
6 April	9	Toulouse Olympique	A	Stade Ernest-Argeles	L	2–8		Reynolds	2,251	RLP, BBC
19 April	10	York City Knights	H	Post Office Road	W	42–12	Hardcastle (2), Sutcliffe (2), Chisholm, Davies, Walters	Chisholm (7)	2,216	RLP, BBC
22 April	11	Toronto Wolfpack	H	Post Office Road	L	14–23	Carey, Makatoa	Chisholm (3)	2,101	RLP, BBC
28 April	12	Barrow Raiders	A	Craven Park	W	26–12	Chisholm (2), Day, King, Sutcliffe	Chisholm (3)	1,277	RLP, BBC
5 May	13	Rochdale Hornets	A	Spotland Stadium	W	56–10	Carey (2), Cooper (2), Chisholm, Golding, Hardcastle, Harrison, King, Makatoa	Chisholm (8)	714	RLP
18 May	14	York City Knights	N	Bloomfield Road	W	42–10	Carey (2), Briscoe, Chisholm, Day, Hardcastle, Holmes, Sutcliffe	Chisholm (5)	7,912	RLP
26 May	15	Bradford Bulls	H	Post Office Road	W	42–4	Chisholm (3), Briscoe, Carey, Davies, King, Walters	Chisholm (5)	2,903	RLP
9 June	16	Sheffield Eagles	A	Olympic Legacy Stadium	W	38–18	King (2), Ferguson, Hardcastle, Harrison, Holmes	Chisholm (7)	1,321	RLP
16 June	17	Widnes Vikings	H	Post Office Road	W	22–4	Sutcliffe (2), Carey, Holmes	Chisholm (3)	2,380	RLP
23 June	18	Barrow Raiders	H	Post Office Road	L	16–38	Sutcliffe (2), Chisholm	Chisholm (2)	1,400	RLP
30 June	19	Halifax R.L.F.C.	A	The Shay	W	24–18	Briscoe, Day, Hardcastle, King	Chisholm (4)	1,888	RLP
7 July	20	Leigh Centurions	H	Post Office Road	W	24–20	Briscoe, Chisholm, Day, Walters	Chisholm (3), Reynolds	3,104	RLP
13 July	21	Toronto Wolfpack	A	Lamport Stadium	L	18–22	Jones, Ormondroyd, Walters	Dagger (3)	7,819	RLP
21 July	22	Rochdale Hornets	H	Post Office Road	W	50–6	Day (2), Briscoe, Golding, Harrison, Jones, King, Makatoa, Walters	Chisholm (7)	2,011	RLP
4 August	23	Dewsbury Rams	A	Crown Flatt	W	25–24	Albert, Carey, Golding, McLelland, Sutcliffe	Chisholm (2 + 1 FG)	1,229	RLP
11 August	24	Swinton Lions	H	Post Office Road	W	66–16	Day (2), King (2), Sutcliffe (2), Albert, Carey, Johnson, McLelland, Render, Walters	Chisholm (9)	2,090	RLP
18 August	25	York City Knights	A	Bootham Crescent	L	18–22	McLelland, Render, Sutcliffe	Chisholm (3)	3,115	RLP
1 September	26	Batley Bulldogs	A	Mount Pleasant	W	64–0	Chisholm (3), Hardcastle (2), Jones (2), Day, Harrison, King, Lockwood	Chisholm (10)	1,602	RLP
7 September	27	Toulouse Olympique	H	Post Office Road	L	24–26	King (2), Chisholm, Sutcliffe	Chisholm (4)	2,334	RLP

==== play-offs ====
Play-off results
Date	Round	Versus	H/A	Venue	Result	Score	Tries	Goals	Attendance	Report
15 September	Qualifying Play-off	Leigh Centurions	A	Leigh Sports Village	W	34–18	Sutcliffe (2), Chisholm, Harrison, McLelland, Walters	Chisholm (5)	2,600	RLP
21 September	Elimination semi-final	York City Knights	A	Bootham Crescent	W	30–4	Day, Harrison, Johnson, Makatoa, Render	Chisholm (5)	3,222	RLP
29 September	Preliminary final	Toulouse Olympique	A	Stade Ernest-Argeles	W	36–12	Davies, Chisholm, Golding, Harrison, Johnson, Render	Chisholm (4)		RLP
8 October	Final	Toronto Wolfpack	A	Lamport Stadium	L	6–24	Sutcliffe	Chisholm	9,974	RLP

===== team bracket =====
Qualifying play-off
2	Toulouse Olympique	44
3	York City Knights	6
4	Leigh Centurions	18
5	Featherstone Rovers	34

Qualifying semi-final
1	Toronto Wolfpack	40
Toulouse Olympique	24
Elimination semi-final
York City Knights	4
Featherstone Rovers	30

Preliminary final
Toulouse Olympique	12
Featherstone Rovers	36

Play-off final
Toronto Wolfpack	24
Featherstone Rovers	6

Source:Rugby League Project

=== Challenge Cup ===
W Win L Loss

Challenge Cup results
Date	Round	Versus	H/A	Venue	Result	Score	Tries	Goals	Attendance	Report
30 March	4	Swinton Lions	H	Post Office Road	W	38–14	Teteh (3), Boas, Broadbent, Day, King, Wheeldon	King (3)	691	RLP
14 April	5	Bradford Bulls	A	Odsal Stadium	L	26–27	Broadbent, Hardcastle, Harrison, Render	Boas (5)	1,691	RLP

=== 1895 Cup ===
W Win L Loss

1895 Cup results
Date	Round	Versus	H/A	Venue	Result	Score	Tries	Goals	Attendance	Report
5 June	2	Widnes Vikings	A	Halton Stadium	L	16–22	Carey, Ormondroyd, Punchard	Punchard (2)	1,515	RLP

== Players ==
Featherstone Rovers 2019 Squad
First team squad				Coaching staff
1 Ashton Golding; 2 Jack Johnson; 3 Josh Hardcastle; 4 Alex Sutcliffe; 5 Conor Carey; 6 Callum McLelland; 7 Dane Chisholm; 8 John Davies; 9 Connor Jones; 9 Cameron King; 10 Makahesi Makatoa; 11 Brad Day; 12 Josh Walters	13 James Lockwood; 14 Luke Cooper; 15 James Harrison; 16 Jack Ormondroyd; 16 Jack Render; 17 Albert Wellington; 17 Jack Bussey; – Sam Hawkins; – Spencer Darley; – James Beckett; – Owen Trout; – Daniel Waite-Pullan; – Brandon French	– Kiedan Hartley; – Ase Boas; – Watson Boas; – Luke Briscoe; – Jack Broadbent; – Will Dagger; – Dale Ferguson; – Macauley Hallett; – Tom Holmes; – Corey Johnson; – James McDaniel; – Dan Maskill; – Harry Newman	– Morgan Punchard; – Ben Reynolds; – Jorge Richardson; – Brad Singleton; – Cameron Smith; – Daniel Smith; – Jordan Tansey; – Thompson Teteh; – Calum Turner; – Scott Wheeldon	Head coach: Ryan Carr; Legend: (c) Captain(s); (vc) Vice-captain(s); Updated: Source(s): Rugby League Project
