= 2023 Featherstone Rovers season =

Rugby football league

- Championship Rank: 1st
- Play-off result: Lost in semi-finals
- Challenge Cup: 3rd round

Team information
- Chairman: Mark Campbell
- Head Coach: Sean Long; James Ford
- Stadium: Post Office Road
← 2022	List of seasons	2024 →

In the 2023 rugby league season, Featherstone Rovers competed in the RFL Championship and the Challenge Cup. In the Championship, Featherstone won the League Leaders' Shield having lost only two regular season games, but suffered a 36–22 upset in the play-off semi-final against London Broncos.

== Season review ==
In October 2022, Sean Long was appointed to succeed Brian McDermott as head coach. Featherstone began their Championship campaign on 6 February with a 50–0 win over newly promoted Keighley Cougars. Featherstone moved to the top of the league on 19 February following a 76–4 win over Whitehaven. On 12 March, Featherstone were knocked out in the third round of the Challenge Cup when Halifax Panthers came from behind to win 22–18. The following week Featherstone resumed their unbeaten run in the Championship with a 34–6 win over Swinton Lions in Round 6.

On 16 May, it was announced that James Ford had been appointed as the first Director of Rugby at Featherstone. On 27 May, Featherstone faced one of Ford's former clubs, York Knights, at the Summer Bash where four tries by Gareth Gale sealed a 46–4 victory. The run of league wins was extended to 13 games with a 64–6 win over Barrow Raiders in which Featherstone had ten different try scorers. On 10 June, Featherstone suffered their first league loss of the season when Toulouse Olympique defeated them 36–18 in Round 14. Following the defeat, Featherstone announced several changes to their backroom structure which included the departure of assistant coach Leon Pryce. A second league defeat for Featherstone came in Round 21 against Halifax. The match, which was scheduled for 7 August, was moved to a day earlier as Halifax were playing in the final of the 1895 Cup the following weekend. On 7 August, Sean Long was sacked from his role as head coach and succeeded by James Ford.

Featherstone secured top place in the table at the start of September with a 16–8 win over Bradford Bulls at Odsal. On 23 September, Featherstone defeated Widnes Vikings 62–10 in the final round of the regular season. After the game they were presented with the League Leaders' Shield having ended 12 points ahead of second-placed Toulouse. As league leaders, Featherstone had a bye in the first round of the play-offs before facing London Broncos in the semi-finals. London had finished fifth in the table, 18 points below the Featherstone, but were in good form having won 42–0 against Sheffield Eagles in the eliminators and they ended Featherstone's season by defeating them 46-22 before overcoming Toulouse in the Grand Final.

== Results ==
=== Pre-season friendlies ===
W Win D Draw L Loss

Pre-season results
Date	Versus	H/A	Venue	Result	Score	Tries	Goals	Attendance	Report
31 December	Castleford Tigers	H	Post Office Road	W	26–10	Gale (2), Day, Kopczak, Lacans	Hankinson (3)		
20 January	Hull Kingston Rovers	H	Post Office Road	W	28–0	Briscoe (2), Kopczak, Gale, Hankinson	Hankinson (2), Hall (2)		
29 January	Wakefield Trinity	A	Belle Vue	L	12–24	Evans, Taylor	Hankinson (2)		

=== RFL Championship ===
==== League table ====
Pos	Team	Pld	W	D	L	PF	PA	PD	Pts	Qualification
1	Featherstone Rovers	27	25	0	2	1079	295	+784	50	League Leaders Shield and qualify for semi-finals
2	Toulouse Olympique	27	19	0	8	834	385	+449	38	Semi-finals
3	Bradford Bulls	27	16	1	10	677	572	+105	33	Eliminators
4	Sheffield Eagles	27	16	0	11	780	560	+220	32	Eliminators
5	London Broncos	27	16	0	11	600	552	+48	32	Eliminators
6	York Knights	27	15	0	12	557	557	0	30	Eliminators
7	Batley Bulldogs	27	15	0	12	506	519	−13	30	
8	Halifax Panthers	27	14	1	12	690	572	+118	29	
9	Widnes Vikings	27	13	0	14	619	654	−35	26	
10	Swinton Lions	27	9	0	18	426	739	−313	18	
11	Barrow Raiders	27	8	1	18	471	672	−201	17	
12	Whitehaven	27	8	0	19	481	809	−328	16	
13	Keighley Cougars	27	8	0	19	506	837	−331	16	Relegation to League One
14	Newcastle Thunder	27	5	1	21	415	918	−503	11	Relegation to League One

Source: RFL
Rules for classification: 1) Competition points; 2) Points difference; 3) Points percentage (points scored/points conceded x 100)

==== Championship results ====
W Win D Draw L Loss

Championship results
Date	Round	Versus	H/A	Venue	Result	Score	Tries	Goals	Attendance	Report
6 February	1	Keighley Cougars	A	Cougar Park	W	50–0	Dean (2), Gale (2), Aekins, Day, Hardcastle, Lockwood, Yei	Hankinson (7)	2,443	RLP
12 February	2	Halifax Panthers	H	Post Office Road	W	46–22	Aekins (2), Dean, Gale, Hankinson, Jones, Springer, Wildie	Hankinson (7)	3,974	RLP
19 February	3	Whitehaven	H	Post Office Road	W	76–4	Gale (2), Leilua, Aekins, Briscoe, Bussey, Davies, Dean, Jones, Kopczak, Lacans, Yei	Hall (10)	2,248	RLP
26 February	4	Newcastle Thunder	H	Post Office Road	W	56–6	Bussey (2), Hardcastle (2), Leilua, Briscoe, Day, Jones, Yei	Dean (8)	2,489	RLP
6 March	5	Bradford Bulls	H	Post Office Road	W	26–12	Briscoe, Davies, Dean, Ford, Gale	Dean (3)	4,809	RLP
19 March	6	Swinton Lions	A	Heywood Road	W	34–6	Evans (2), Aekins, Gale, Hardcastle, Jones, Lacans	Dean (3)	1,090	RLP
26 March	7	York Knights	H	Post Office Road	W	46–4	Gale (3), Cozza, Evans, Jones, Leilua, Taylor	Hall (7)	2,892	RLP
7 April	8	Batley Bulldogs	A	Mount Pleasant	W	26–18	Hardcastle (2), Briscoe, Jones, Leilua	Hall (3)	2,287	RLP
16 April	9	London Broncos	A	Plough Lane	W	40–10	Jones (3), Aekins (2), Day (2)	Dean (6)	977	RLP
7 May	10	Sheffield Eagles	H	Post Office Road	W	28–20	Briscoe (2), Aekins, Bussey, Hardcastle	Dean (3), Bussey	3,187	RLP
14 May	11	Widnes Vikings	A	Halton Stadium	W	30–0	Gale (3), Bussey, Hall, Jones	Hall (3)	2,832	RLP
27 May	12	York Knights	N	York Community Stadium	W	46–4	Gale (4), Cozza, Evans, Jones, Leilua, Taylor	Hall (7)	3,793	RLP
4 June	13	Barrow Raiders	H	Post Office Road	W	64–6	Jones (2), Aekins, Briscoe, Bussey, Gale, Hall, Hankinson, Hau, Lacans, Yei	Hall (10)	2,756	RLP
10 June	14	Toulouse Olympique	H	Post Office Road	L	18–36	Briscoe, Davies, Hall, Hankinson	Hall (1)	3,489	RLP
18 June	15	London Broncos	H	Post Office Road	W	50–6	Aekins (2), Day, Gale, Jones, Kheirallah, Lacans, Leilua, Wildie	Kheirallah (7)	2,255	RLP
25 June	16	York Knights	A	York Community Stadium	W	24–8	Leilua (2), Jones, Kheirallah	Kheirallah (4)	2,554	RLP,
2 July	17	Whitehaven	A	Recreation Ground	W	60–0	Leilua (2), Jones, Kheirallah (4), Aekins (2), Briscoe, Hau, Jones, Leilua, Springer	Kheirallah (8)	841	RLP,
9 July	18	Swinton Lions	H	Post Office Road	W	52–6	Hall (2), Hau (2), Briscoe, Jones, Kheirallah, Lacans, Springer	Kheirallah (8)	2,845	RLP, BBC
16 July	19	Barrow Raiders	A	Craven Park	W	20–10	Briscoe, Gale, Hall, Hau	Kheirallah (2)	2,361	RLP, Barrow
29 July	20	Batley Bulldogs	H	Post Office Road	W	28–8	Hau (2), Smith, Taylor, Wildie	Hankinson (4)	3,145	RLP
6 August	21	Halifax Panthers	A	Shay Stadium	L	22–25	Briscoe, Kheirallah, Kopczak, Springer	Kheirallah (3)	1,609	RLP
18 August	22	Sheffield Eagles	A	Olympic Legacy Park	W	38–10	Hau (2), Aekins, Chisholm, Gale, Hankinson, Moors	Kheirallah (5)	1,709	RLP
27 August	23	Keighley Cougars	H	Post Office Road	W	36–6	Gale (2), Jones (2), Kheirallah (2), Leilua	Kheirallah (4)	3,235	RLP
3 September	24	Bradford Bulls	A	Odsal Stadium	W	16–8	Aekins, Day, Gale	Kheirallah (2)	4,567	RLP
8 September	25	Newcastle Thunder	A	Kingston Park	W	56–22	Gale (3), Hall (2), Cozza, Day, Longstff, Taylor, Wildie	Hall (8)	747	RLP
16 September	26	Toulouse Olympique	A	Stade des Minimes	W	29–16	Hall Jones, Kheirallah, Lacans, Leilua	Kheirallah (4), Lacans (FG)	2,603	RLP
23 September	27	Widnes Vikings	H	Post Office Road	W	62–10	Leilua (3), Aekins (2), Gale (2), Hall, Hankinson, Jones, Moors	Kheirallah (9)	3,874	RLP

==== Play-offs ====
Play-off results
Date	Round	Versus	H/A	Venue	Result	Score	Tries	Goals	Attendance	Report
8 October	Semi-final	London Broncos	H	Post Office Road	L	26–36	Hankinson (2), Leilua (2), Briscoe	Kheirallah (3)		RFL

===== Team bracket =====
Eliminators
4	Sheffield Eagles	0
5	London Broncos	42
3	Bradford Bulls	22
6	York Knights	8

Semi-finals
1	Featherstone Rovers	26
5	London Broncos	36
2	Toulouse Olympique	38
3	Bradford Bulls	20

Grand Final
2	Toulouse Olympique	14
5	London Broncos	18

Sources:Rugby League Project

=== Challenge Cup ===
W Win L Loss

Challenge Cup results
Date	Round	Versus	H/A	Venue	Result	Score	Tries	Goals	Attendance	Report
12 March	3	Halifax Panthers	H	Post Office Road	L	18–22	Hardcastle, Lacans, Springer	Hall (3)		RFL

== Players ==
=== Squad ===
Featherstone Rovers 2023 Squad
First team squad			Coaching staff
1 Brandon Pickersgill; 2 Luke Briscoe; 3 Chris Hankinson; 4 Craig Hall; 5 Gareth Gale; 6 Johnathan Ford; 7 Riley Dean; 8 Craig Kopczak; 9 Connor Jones; 10 James Lockwood; 11 Brad Day; 12 Elijah Taylor; 13 Jack Bussey	14 Matty Wildie; 15 John Davies; 16 Junior Moors; 17 Gadwin Springer; 18 Josh Hardcastle; 19 Luke Cooper; 20 Mark Kheirallah; 21 Joey Leilua; 22 Dan Fleming; 23 Caleb Aekins; 24 Mathieu Cozza; 25 Thomas Lacans; 26 Tyla Hepi	27 McKenzie Yei; 28 Kyle Evans; 29 Yusuf Aydin; 30 Albert Vete; 31 Arama Hau; 32 Daniel Smith; 33 Logan Astley; 34 Dane Chisholm; 35 Ellis Longstaff	Head coach: Sean Long (to May); James Ford (from May); Legend: (c) Captain(s); (vc) Vice-captain(s); Updated: Source(s): Rugby League Project,

=== Transfers ===
Gains

List of players joining Featherstone
Player	Club	Contract	Date
Chris Hankinson	Toulouse Olympique	1 Year	October 2022
Mathieu Cozza	Catalans Dragons	1 Year	October 2022
Thomas Lacans	Newcastle Thunder		
Elijah Taylor	Salford Red Devils		
Riley Dean	Warrington Wolves		
Caleb Aekins	Leigh Leopards	2 Years	November 2022
McKenzie Yei	Queensland Capras	1 Year	December 2022
Kyle Evans	Wakefield Trinity	1 Year	January 2023
Brad Day	Newcastle Thunder		

Losses

List of players leaving Featherstone
Player	Club	Contract	Date
Ben Hellewell	Salford Red Devils		
Adam Cuthbertson	Retired		
Jesse Sene-Lefao	Sheffield Eagles		
Callum Field	Widnes Vikings		
Jacob Doyle	Dewsbury Rams		
Morgan Smith	Wakefield Trinity	2 Year	October 2022
Brett Ferres	Doncaster		
Loui McConnell	Doncaster		
Ryley Jacks	Released		November 2022
