= Joe Mullaney =

Joseph or Joe Mullaney may refer to:

- Joe Mullaney (rugby league) (born 1934), English rugby league footballer
- Joe Mullaney (basketball) (1924–2000), American basketball player and coach
- Joe Mullaney (actor) (born 1962), Scottish actor
- Joe Mullaney Jr., coach of St. John's Red Storm women's basketball 1984–1996
