= IMG Grading for the British Rugby Football League =

IMG Grading for the Rugby Football League is a set of proposals set out in 2022 by the British Rugby Football League's new strategic partner IMG, in which all clubs playing in the professional levels of the British rugby league system will be graded, with their rank determining which division each club will play. The proposals were accepted by a majority vote of British rugby league stakeholders in 2023 with implementation starting in the 2024 season.

The grading in the new system will see:

- Grade A clubs will be guaranteed a place in Super League, and will be exempt from relegation.
- Grade B clubs will be eligible to participate in Super League, and the highest ranked Grade B clubs will occupy the remaining slots.
- Grade C clubs will be ineligible for Super League thus can only compete in the Championship and League One.

Grades will be reassessed annually.

This will be the second attempt to introduce a "Super League licence", with the first being introduced in 2009 and scrapped in 2014 after two cycles.

== Voting ==
Voting for this proposal occurred on 19 April 2023. All 35 British RFL clubs of the 2023 season (Note: This included the West Wales Raiders, who withdrew from League One before the season started.) received a vote, with Super League clubs' votes being more heavily weighted. A further seven votes were given to representatives from the community game in tiers 4 and 5 of the British rugby league system. With an overall majority needed to pass, along with a majority in each voting block (Super League, Championship/League One, and Community Game). The proposal passed 86% to 14%.

=== Opposition ===
Championship sides Barrow, Batley, Featherstone Rovers, and Keighley, and League One sides Hunslet, Dewsbury, and West Wales voted against the proposals, Whilst Salford and Whitehaven abstained from the vote.

Keighley, who had been extremely vocal in their opposition of the proposal since the start, and the only club who voted against the plans even being discussed, released a statement accusing IMG of "blinding" rugby league with "nice presentation[s] and big words", citing that their proposals "will be the death of Championship, League One, and other heartland clubs" and that the proposal was "underfunded" and had zero marketing plans, in addition to accusing IMG of "masquerad[ing] on false promises" and "lies".

Despite voting in favour of grading, London Broncos owner David Hughes released a statement opposing the grading system in January 2024. He cited that the inclusion of grading had "[condemned the] club to relegation before a ball has even been kicked" and as a result removed the "jeopardy and drama" from the sport. Hughes was particularly agreved with the points the club gained for catchment, being "the lowest possible", despite being the only professional team in the South East. He also affirmed that "promotion and relegation should be a staple of all sports".

== Criteria ==
Each club will be awarded a maximum of 20 points across five categories:

- Fandom (5 points): Includes match attendance, TV viewership, social media following, and website visits.
- On-field Performance (5 points): Assessed on league position over the past three years with bonus points for winning the Grand Final and Challenge Cup Final.
- Finance (4.5 points): Assessed on profitability, financial stability, and a diversification of revenue streams.
- Stadium (3 points): Stadium and other facilities would be assessed.
- Community (2.5 points): Assessed fanbase vs fanbase potential, as well as assessing community and charity work.

15 points is needed for Grade A status, while 7.5 is needed for Grade B.

== Changes to league structure ==
IMG main aim is to have the Super League made entirely of Grade A clubs and by grading clubs it highlights areas they are to improve on. Having expressed plans to expand Super League it is possible that if and when more than 12 clubs were Graded A then the league would expand to keep these clubs out of the Championship as Grade A clubs are exempt from relegation. Following a statement where the IMG claimed that the chances of the Championship Grand Final winners being denied promotion were "very remote", doubts were shed over how the system would work, as initially it was understood that the remaining Super League places would be taken up by the highest ranked Grade B clubs, however this statement suggested that so long as the Championship winner and bottom placed Super League club were both Grade B promotion and relegation would occur as normal. Neither IMG nor the RFL had clarified either of these issues before the system's first implementation.

=== 2024: Implementation in practice ===
==== Promotion / Relegation ====
Following the 2024 season, Wakefield were promoted. They were Championship Grand Final winners as well as the highest ranked Championship club, and the only Championship club to achieve Grade A. London were relegated after finishing last in Super League, and were also the lowest ranked Super League club, achieve Grade B. Thus, no answers of the above unknown were given.

==== Expansion ====
Following the 2024 grading, Rugby League Commercial Chief Rhodri Jones stated that on current trend, Super League would expand to 14 teams for the 2026 season with more than 12 Grade A clubs predicted. However, this would be subject to a vote from current Super League clubs.

=== 2025: Promotion / Relegation proposal ===
Ahead of the 2025 season, a proposal is to be discussed which would see any Grade B Championship winners automatically promoted and replace the lowest ranked Grade B Super League club, and would see Super League expand if all 12 were Grade A. During the reporting of this, it was also stated that many clubs believed this to be the system at current. However, this proposal was rejected by an unknown majority vote by stakeholders.

== Grades ==
=== 2024 Indicative Grades ===
Clubs' grades for 2024 (awarded in October 2023) were indicative, meaning they would have no bearing and were given out for illustrative purposes to aid clubs in making necessary improvements for the first 'official' grades in 2025.

The 2024 grades were released on 25 October 2023 and saw seven clubs (all Super League) awarded Grade A, 17 clubs awarded Grade B, and 11 clubs awarded Grade C. London Skolars withdrew from League One after the 2023 season and did not receive a grade, while Newcastle Thunder, who had also announced a likely withdrawal after being relegated to League One but were aiming to keep a place in the league, still received a grade.

Rank	Club	Division	Points
Grade A
1	Leeds Rhinos	Super League	17.49
2	Wigan Warriors	Super League	16.87
3	St Helens	Super League	16.78
4	Catalans Dragons	Super League	16.73
5	Warrington Wolves	Super League	15.75
6	Hull Kingston Rovers	Super League	15.52
7	Hull F.C.	Super League	15.05
Grade B
8	Salford Red Devils	Super League	13.80
9	Huddersfield Giants	Super League	13.49
10	Toulouse Olympique	Championship	12.97
11	Wakefield Trinity	Championship	12.52
12	Leigh Leopards	Super League	12.45
13	Castleford Tigers	Super League	12.16
14	Bradford Bulls	Championship	12.02
15	Featherstone Rovers	Championship	10.65
16	Widnes Vikings	Championship	10.17
17	York Knights	Championship	10.05
18	Newcastle Thunder	League One	9.30
19	Barrow Raiders	Championship	9.18
20	Halifax Panthers	Championship	9.06
21	Batley Bulldogs	Championship	8.62
22	Sheffield Eagles	Championship	8.36
23	Doncaster	Championship	8.11
24	London Broncos	Super League	8.07
Grade C
25	Oldham	League One	7.39
26	Swinton Lions	Championship	7.21
27	Dewsbury Rams	Championship	7.10
28	Rochdale Hornets	League One	7.03
29	Hunslet	League One	6.94
30	Keighley Cougars	League One	6.58
31	Workington Town	League One	6.54
32	Whitehaven	Championship	6.27
33	Midlands Hurricanes	League One	5.92
34	Cornwall	League One	5.75
35	North Wales Crusaders	League One	5.07

==== Club responses ====
- Barrow Raiders: Barrow released a statement fully detailing the scores received in each criterion, and its aims to improve on particular areas including attendances, social media engagements, on-field performance and finance. The club also noted it would be awarded an extra 0.5 points due to a change in local authority area that was originally not accounted for, and an inability to improve its Craven Park home was a barrier to entering Super League and "the time is now right to consider other options".
- Bradford Bulls: Bradford released a statement, claiming the grading "should leave no one in any doubt that the single biggest impediment to getting our club back to the Super League is the absence of an appropriate 21st century facility", calling for council support to develop Odsal Stadium to become a viable stadium for the Super League.
- Castleford Tigers: After submitting incorrect data in a form to the RFL which it claimed cost it half a point, Castleford appealed its grade, however this was rejected. Castleford accepted the ruling with assurance that should the error be rectified, the club's score would improve in 2024.
- Featherstone Rovers: Featherstone reiterated its previous criticism of the grading concept, arguing in a statement that it would "protect the status quo and actually have the reverse effect on Clubs like ours in terms of investment to reach the top level".
- Halifax Panthers: Halifax stated it was "content" with its rank of 20th and declared its goal to increase its score to 10.5 in 2024.
- Keighley Cougars: Keighley called its rank of 30th an "insult" and additionally called for a merger of the Championship and League One competitions.
- Leeds Rhinos: Leeds released a statement welcoming the provision of a Grade A status. Chief executive Gary Hetherington said the club was "pleased" but would "not be complacent" about areas for potential improvement.
- London Broncos: The London Broncos ended its elite academy to focus on improving other areas of the club, as the academy would not factor into its grading.
- North Wales Crusaders: Chief executive Andy Moulsdale claimed the Crusaders' bottom ranking was not a "fair reflection" of the club's progress after it had barely missed promotion to the Championship in 2023. He said the gradings "make it increasingly harder for League One teams to reach Super League".
- Salford Red Devils: The club's ownership stated it was "pleased" to receive a score of 13.80 and there was "lots to be positive about".
- Whitehaven: Chief executive Barry Morgan said the club was "disappointed" with its score, particularly its community score, claiming the club was heavily involved in community organisations and events and he did not know "what else a club has to do to improve its score of 0.75 out of 2.5".

=== 2025 ===
The grades for 2025 were released on 23 October 2024. The grades were the following:

Rank	Club	Division	Change	Points
Grade A
1	St Helens	Super League	▲2	▲17.02
2	Wigan Warriors	Super League	Steady	▲16.91
3	Leeds Rhinos	Super League	▼2	▼16.84
4	Warrington Wolves	Super League	▲1	▲16.27
5	Hull Kingston Rovers	Super League	▲1	▲15.97
6	Catalans Dragons	Super League	▼2	▼15.52
7	Leigh Leopards	Super League	▲5	▲15.13
8	Wakefield Trinity	Super League	▲3	▲15.09
9	Castleford Tigers	Super League	▲4	▲15.02
Grade B
10	Hull F.C.	Super League	▼3	▼14.51
11	Huddersfield Giants	Super League	▼2	▲14.48
12	Salford Red Devils	Super League	▼4	▲13.97
13	Toulouse Olympique	Championship	▼3	▲13.58
14	London Broncos	Championship	▲10	▲12.65
15	York Knights	Championship	▲2	▲12.42
16	Bradford Bulls	Championship	▼2	▲12.15
17	Barrow Raiders	Championship	▲2	▲11.22
18	Featherstone Rovers	Championship	▼3	▲10.75
19	Keighley Cougars	League One	▲11	▲9.02
20	Halifax Panthers	Championship	Steady	▼8.79
21	Sheffield Eagles	Championship	▲1	▲8.77
22	Widnes Vikings	Championship	▼6	▼8.60
23	Doncaster	Championship	Steady	▼7.52
Grade C
24	Workington Town	League One	▲7	▲7.26
25	Swinton Lions	League One	▲1	▼7.15
26	Dewsbury Rams	League One	▲1	▲7.13
27	Oldham	Championship	▼2	▼7.00
28	Hunslet	Championship	▲1	▲6.98
29	Rochdale Hornets	League One	▼1	▼6.47
30	Midlands Hurricanes	League One	▲3	▼5.66
31	Cornwall	League One	▲3	▼5.29
32	Newcastle Thunder	League One	▼14	▼5.20
33	North Wales Crusaders	League One	▲2	▼4.72
Unranked
Batley Bulldogs		Championship	Incomplete data submission	
Whitehaven		League One	Incomplete data submission	
Goole Vikings		League One	New club; no data to submit	

==== Changes ====
- Grade B to A: 3 Clubs
- Grade A to B: 1 Club
- Grade C to B: 1 Club
- Grade B to C: 1 Club
- Grade B to Unranked: 1 Club
- Grade C to Unranked: 1 Club

==== Effect on Super League status ====
Wakefield Trinity were elevated to Super League after achieving an A Grade, scoring 15.09 after winning the 2024 Championship Grand Final.

Bottom team London Broncos were relegated to the Championship after finishing 14th in the gradings.

=== 2026 ===
Grades for 2026 were released on 16 October 2025.

Starting in 2026, the Super League will become a 14 team competition, however the additional two spaces will be decided by an independent panel rather than IMG Gradings. This expansion opened the door for a long proposed merge of the Championship and League One into a single division.

Rank	Club	Division	Change	Points
Grade A
1	Hull Kingston Rovers	Super League	▲4	▲17.85
2	Leeds Rhinos	Super League	▲2	▲17.28
3	St Helens	Super League	▼2	▲17.24
4	Wigan Warriors	Super League	▼2	▼16.27
5	Leigh Leopards	Super League	▲2	▲16.33
6	Warrington Wolves	Super League	▼2	▼16.26
7	Catalans Dragons	Super League	▼1	▲16.11
8	Wakefield Trinity	Super League	Steady	▲15.74
9	Hull F.C.	Super League	▲1	▲15.06
Grade B
10	Bradford Bulls	Super League	▲6	▲14.81
11	Castleford Tigers	Super League	▼1	▼14.66
12	Huddersfield Giants	Super League	Steady	▲14.65
13	Toulouse Olympique	Super League	Steady	▼13.28
14	York Knights	Super League	▲1	▲13.04
15	Salford Red Devils	Championship	▼3	▲12.65
16	London Broncos	Championship	▼2	▼11.65
17	Featherstone Rovers	Championship	▲1	▼9.75
18	Barrow Raiders	Championship	▼1	▼9.62
19	Widnes Vikings	Championship	▲3	▲9.39
20	Sheffield Eagles	Championship	▲1	▼8.47
21	Batley Bulldogs	Championship	Previously Unranked	▲8.16
22	Halifax Panthers	Championship	▼1	▼8.15
23	Doncaster	Championship	Steady	▲7.85
24	Oldham	Championship	▲3	▲7.51
Grade C
25	Hunslet	Championship	▲3	▼6.87
26	Dewsbury Rams	Championship	Steady	▼6.74
27	Workington Town	Championship	▼3	▼6.57
28	Swinton Lions	Championship	▼3	▼6.54
29	Whitehaven	Championship	Previously Unranked	▲6.53
30	Rochdale Hornets	Championship	▼1	▼5.52
31	Goole Vikings	Championship	Previously Unranked	▲5.46
32	Midlands Hurricanes	Championship	▼2	▼4.89
33	North Wales Crusaders	Championship	Steady	▲4.88
Unranked
Keighley Cougars		Championship	Incomplete data submission	
Newcastle Thunder		Championship	Incomplete data submission	

==== Changes ====
- Grade B to A: 1 Club
- Grade A to B: 1 Club
- Grade C to B: 1 Club
- Grade B to C: 0 Clubs
- Grade B to Unranked: 1 Club
- Grade C to Unranked: 1 Club

==== Effect on Super League status ====
Bradford Bulls were elevated after moving six places up in the Gradings to 10th.

2025 Championship Grand Final winners Toulouse Olympique and runners up York Knights were elected into an expanded Super League by an independent board after they finished 13th and 14th in the Gradings respectively.

Salford Red Devils finished last in Super League and were relegated having dropped down to 15th in the Gradings and not applying to be in the expanded competition.

== Criticism ==
Telegraph & Argus wrote an article applauding the system in principle but claimed it would be financially unfeasible to make the improvements for any clubs outside the 2024 top 14.

RFL President Lindsay Hoyle described the system as "[rewarding those who've] got money in the bank" and "[having] something to play for [is always] the best initiative". He further criticised the removal of promotion and relegation, waring that it will reduce investment from clubs as there is less to aspire to.

Ahead of the 2024 Grading deadline, Hunslet's CEO criticised the grading system saying most of the criteria is not applicable to lower league sides. Further claiming it was "demoralising" to submit the necessary data, due to League 1 sides being judged on the same criteria as Super League club. He also stated that the current system inhibits lower league sides from gaining new fans as it "portrays to the wider public, that we are a club not at the required standard". He finishes his statement by urging the RFL to take the advice of its president and fans (76% wanting a return of the previous system) and accusing the RFL of only caring about the top clubs and not learning anything in 25 years.

Further, League 1 club Rochdale Hornets chairman accused IMG of creating a "closed shop" and warned that the lack of jeopardy would reduce competitiveness and overall quality of the league long term. Leigh Leopards chairman Derek Beaumont, who were comfortably safe from relegation under both the traditional and IMG systems, threatened to bring legal proceedings to the league if Hull F.C. were spared relegation while finishing last at the expense of another club.

== See also ==
- British rugby league system
