= Daniel Evans =

Daniel, Danny or Dan Evans may refer to:

== Arts and entertainment ==
- Daniel Evans (Welsh poet) (Daniel Ddu o Geredigion, 1792–1846), Welsh poet
- Daniel Evans (singer) (born 1969), The X Factor 2008 finalist
- Daniel Evans (actor) (born 1973), Welsh actor
- Dan Evans, character in the film 3:10 to Yuma

== Sport ==
- Dan Evans (baseball) (born 1960), American baseball executive
- Danny Evans (cricketer) (born 1987), Middlesex cricketer
- Dan Evans (rugby union) (born 1988), Welsh rugby union player
- Danny Evans (rugby league), English rugby league footballer, and coach
- Dan Evans (tennis) (born 1990), English tennis player

== Others ==
- Daniel Silvan Evans (1818–1903), Welsh scholar and lexicographer
- Daniel J. Evans (1925–2024), Governor of Washington and United States Senator
- Daniel Evans (minister) (1774–1835), Welsh independent Christian minister
- Daniel Ivor Evans (bishop) (1900–1962), Anglican bishop in South America

== See also ==
- Danielle Evans (disambiguation)
