= Nathan Batty =

English rugby league footballer

Personal information
- Full name: Nathan Batty
- Born: 20 May 1982 (age 43)

Playing information
- Position: Fullback, Wing, Centre
Club
Years	Team	Pld	T	G	FG	P
2001	Wakefield Trinity Wildcats	2	0	0	0	0
2002–≥02	Dewsbury Rams
2004–08	Featherstone Rovers	51	12	0	0	48
	Total	53	12	0	0	48

Nathan Batty (born 20 May 1982) is a professional rugby league footballer who played in the 2000s. He played at club level for the Wakefield Trinity Wildcats, the Dewsbury Rams, and Featherstone Rovers, as a fullback, wing, or centre.

== Playing career ==
=== Club career ===
Nathan Batty made his début for the Wakefield Trinity Wildcats during 2001's Super League VI, he played his last match for the Wakefield Trinity Wildcats during 2001's Super League VI, he made his début for Featherstone Rovers on Sunday 1 February 2004, and he played his last match for Featherstone Rovers during the 2008 season.
