= Danielle Evans =

Danielle Evans is the name of:

- Dani Evans (born 1985; Danielle Evans), American fashion model
- Danielle Evans (writer), American writer

== See also ==
- Daniel Evans (disambiguation)
