= Malcolm Dixon =

Malcolm Dixon may refer to

- Malcolm Dixon (biochemist) (1899–1985), English biochemist
- Malcolm Dixon (actor) (1934–2020), English actor
- Malcolm Dixon (rugby league) (born 1939), English rugby league footballer
