= Cliff Lambert =

English rugby league footballer (1930–2026)

Personal information
- Full name: Clifford Lambert
- Born: 30 January 1930 Pontefract district, England
- Died: 23 April 2026 (aged 96)

Playing information
- Position: Second-row, Loose forward
Club
Years	Team	Pld	T	G	FG	P
1949–62	Featherstone Rovers	376	82	3	0	252
1962–63	Hunslet	6	0	0	0	0
	Total	382	82	3	0	252

Clifford Lambert (30 January 1930 – 23 April 2026) was an English professional rugby league footballer who played in the 1940s, 1950s and 1960s. He played at club level for Featherstone Rovers (vice-captain), and Hunslet, as a second-row or loose forward.

== Background ==
Cliff Lambert's was born in the Pontefract district, West Riding of Yorkshire, England on 30 January 1930. He lived at Robbins Terrace, Featherstone.

== Playing career ==
=== Club career ===
Lambert made his début for Featherstone Rovers on Tuesday 20 September 1949.

He played loose forward in Featherstone Rovers' 12-18 defeat by Workington Town in the 1951–52 Challenge Cup Final during the 1951–52 season at Wembley Stadium, London on Saturday 19 April 1952, in front of a crowd of 72,093.

Lambert played at second-row, and scored a try in Featherstone Rovers' 15-14 victory over Hull F.C. in the 1959–60 Yorkshire Cup Final during the 1959–60 season at Headingley, Leeds on Saturday 31 October 1959.

Lambert's benefit season/testimonial match at Featherstone Rovers took place during the 1959–60 season.

He finished his career at Hunslet, where he played at second-row in their 12–2 victory over Hull Kingston Rovers in the 1962–63 Yorkshire Cup Final during the 1962–63 season at Headingley, Leeds on Saturday 27 October 1962.

== Personal life and death ==
Lambert was the father of the rugby union footballer for Headingley FC and Harlequin F.C. Colin Lambert.

Cliff Lambert died on 23 April 2026, aged 96.

== Honours ==
Lambert was a Featherstone Rovers Hall of Fame inductee.
