= George Pieniazek =

English RL coach and former rugby league footballer

Playing information
- Position: Wing
Club
Years	Team	Pld	T	G	FG	P
1980–81	Bramley RLFC
1981	Wakefield Trinity	2	1	0	0	3
1982	Batley	25	1	0	0	3
	Total	27	2	0	0	6

Coaching information
Club
Years	Team	Gms	W	D	L	W%
1984–85	Batley	1	0	0	1	0
1985–87	Featherstone Rovers	37	11	4	22	30
	Total	38	11	4	23	29

George Pieniazek is a former physical education teacher at St Thomas à Becket school in Wakefield, and professional rugby league footballer who played in the 1980s, and coached in the 1980s. He played at club level for Bramley RLFC and Wakefield Trinity as a wing and coached at club level for Batley, and Featherstone Rovers.

== Playing career ==
=== Club career ===
George Pieniazek made his début for Wakefield Trinity in April 1982. He also played for Bramley in the 1980–81 season.

== Coaching career ==
=== Club career ===
George Pieniazek was the coach of Batley from November 1984 to November 1985.
