= James Houston (rugby league) =

Scotland international rugby league footballer

Personal information
- Full name: James Houston
- Born: 28 December 1982 (age 42)

Playing information
- Position: Loose forward, Prop, Second-row
Club
Years	Team	Pld	T	G	FG	P
2003–09	Featherstone Rovers	138	9	1	0	38
2010–11	Hunslet Hawks	46	6	0	0	24
2012	York City Knights	12	1	0	0	4
2013–15	Hunslet Hawks	70	13	1	0	54
	Total	266	29	2	0	120
Representative
Years	Team	Pld	T	G	FG	P
2003	Scotland	1	0	0	0	0
- Source: As of 13 August 2024

James Houston (born 28 December 1982) is an English former rugby league footballer who played in the 2000s and 2010s. He played at representative level for Scotland, and at club level for the Hunslet Hawks, Featherstone Rovers and the York City Knights in the Championship, as a prop or loose forward.

He has played at representative level for Scotland in 2003.
