= Macauley Hallett =

English rugby league footballer

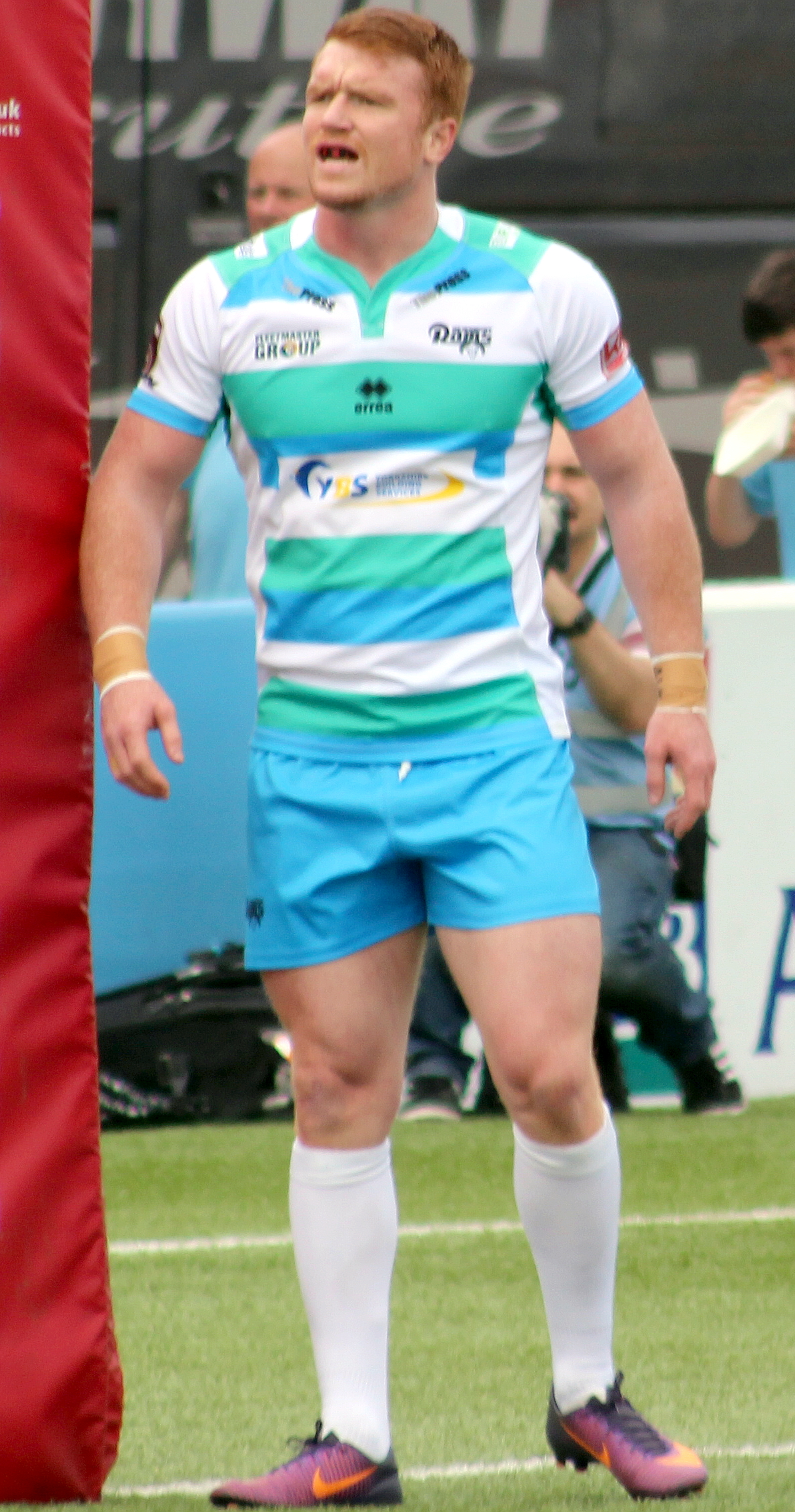

Personal information
- Born: 27 November 1995 (age 30) Hull, Humberside, England
- Height: 6 ft 1 in (185 cm)
- Weight: 14 st 13 lb (95 kg)

Playing information
- Position: Wing, Centre
Club
| Years | Team | Pld | T | G | FG | P |
|---|---|---|---|---|---|---|
| 2014 | Hull Kingston Rovers | 2 | 3 | 0 | 0 | 12 |
| 2015(loan) | → Newcastle Thunder | 12 | 10 | 0 | 0 | 40 |
| 2016 | Swinton Lions | 25 | 17 | 0 | 0 | 68 |
| 2017 | Batley Bulldogs | 13 | 7 | 0 | 0 | 28 |
| 2017–18 | Dewsbury Rams | 33 | 12 | 0 | 0 | 48 |
| 2019–20 | Keighley Cougars | 18 | 4 | 0 | 0 | 16 |
| 2022 | Hunslet RLFC | 9 | 9 | 0 | 0 | 36 |
| 2023 | Midlands Hurricanes | 5 | 3 | 0 | 0 | 12 |
| | Total | 117 | 65 | 0 | 0 | 260 |
- Source: As of 19 March 2023

Macauley Hallett (born 27 November 1995) is an English rugby league footballer who plays as wing, centre for Midlands Hurricanes in the RFL League 1. He has played at club level for West Hull A.R.L.F.C. (Juniors), Norland Sharks ARLFC (in Hessle, East Riding of Yorkshire, of the Yorkshire Men's League), Hull Kingston Rovers, Newcastle Thunder (loan), Swinton Lions, Batley Bulldogs, Dewsbury Rams and Keighley Cougars, as a wing or centre.

== Background ==
Hallett was born in Kingston upon Hull, Humberside.

== Playing career ==
A former West Hull junior, Macauley is a product of a Hull Kingston Rovers scholarship. On 27 May 2014, he signed a two-year contract extension. He played in the centre and was the youngest player of Hull Kingston Rovers' first team before his transfer from Hull Kingston Rovers to Swinton Lions in late October 2015. He was a trialist a Featherstone Rovers.
