= Joe Hirst =

English rugby league footballer

Personal information
- Full name: Joseph Hirst
- Born: 21 April 1987 (age 39) Wakefield, England
- Height: 6 ft 1 in (1.85 m)
- Weight: 16 st 1 lb (102 kg)

Playing information
- Position: Second-row, Loose forward
Club
Years	Team	Pld	T	G	FG	P
2006–07	Halifax	≥1				0
2008	Wakefield Trinity Wildcats	0
2009	Featherstone Rovers	14	4	0	0	16
2009–14	Sheffield Eagles	114	33	0	0	132
	Total		37	0	0	148
- As of 23 February 2015

Joe Hirst (born 21 April 1987) is an English professional rugby league footballer who has played in the 2000s and 2010s. He played at club level for Halifax, Wakefield Trinity (reserve grade), Featherstone Rovers and Sheffield Eagles, as a second-row, or loose forward. Joe signed for Sheffield Eagles in 2009, and in 2011 won the Supporters Player of the year award, along with the Players Player of the award, as Sheffield reached the Championship Grand Final.
