= Matty Dale =

English rugby league footballer

Personal information
- Full name: Matthew Dale
- Born: 10 October 1986 (age 40) Kingston upon Hull, Humberside, England
- Height: 6 ft 2 in (1.88 m)
- Weight: 15 st 4 lb (97 kg)

Playing information
- Position: Second-row
Club
Years	Team	Pld	T	G	FG	P
2006–08	Hull F.C.	9	2	0	0	8
2007(loan)	→ Whitehaven
2008(loan)	→ Wakefield Trinity Wildcats	2	0	0	0	0
2008(loan)	→ Featherstone Rovers	13	6	0	0	24
2009–15	Featherstone Rovers	153	48	0	0	192
2016	York City Knights	6	0	0	0	0
	Total	183	56	0	0	224
- Source: As of 2 December 2017

Matty Dale (born 10 October 1986) is an English former professional rugby league footballer who played in the 2000s and 2010s.

== Background ==
Dale was born in Kingston upon Hull, Humberside.

== Playing career ==
Matty Dale's position of choice is in the second-row.

He played for Whitehaven and Featherstone Rovers in the National Leagues and Hull F.C. and the Wakefield Trinity Wildcats in the Super League. He joined Featherstone Rovers in 2009 and made more than 150 appearances for the club, however his career was interrupted by injury in 2014 and he underwent knee reconstruction. As a free agent he signed for the York City Knights in April 2016 but following an injury-hit season he announced his retirement at the end of the year.
