= Jack Lee (rugby league) =

English rugby league footballer

Personal information
- Full name: Jack Lee
- Born: 1 November 1988 (age 37)
- Height: 5 ft 10 in (1.78 m)
- Weight: 15 st 2 lb (96 kg)

Playing information
- Position: Hooker
Club
Years	Team	Pld	T	G	FG	P
2009–10	Featherstone Rovers	36	8	0	0	32
2010–14	York City Knights	111	57	0	0	228
2014	Keighley Cougars	13	1	0	0	4
2015–20	Hunslet	93	36	0	0	144
	Total	253	102	0	0	408
- As of 15 October 2019

Jack Lee is an English former rugby league footballer who last played for Hunslet in League 1. He played as a hooker.

He has previously played for Castleford and Featherstone Rovers. His position is hooker. He played his junior rugby with Smawthorne Panthers.

In 2014, Lee set a club record at York City Knights by scoring tries in ten consecutive matches.
