= Josh Hardcastle =

English professional rugby league footballer

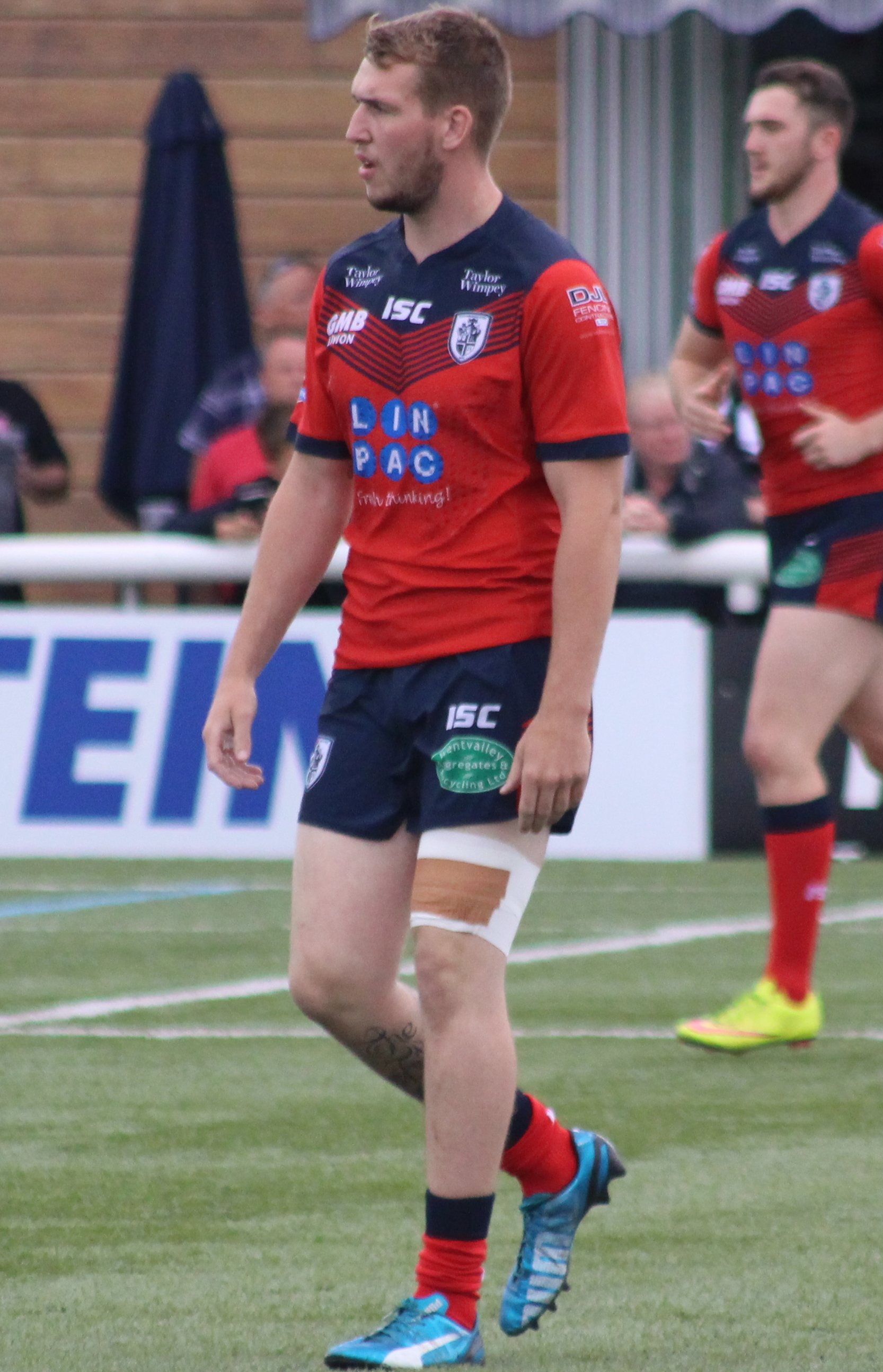

Personal information
- Full name: Joshua Hardcastle
- Born: 28 August 1992 (age 33) Pontefract, West Yorkshire, England
- Height: 6 ft 1 in (1.85 m)
- Weight: 14 st 7 lb (92 kg)

Playing information
- Position: Centre, Wing
Club
Years	Team	Pld	T	G	FG	P
2017–25	Featherstone Rovers	177	75	1	0	302
- Source: As of 14 January 2026

Joshua Hardcastle (born 28 August 1992) is a former professional rugby league player who plays as a centre, wing for amateur side Featherstone Lions in the National Conference League.

== Background ==
Hardcastle was born in Pontefract, West Yorkshire, England.

== Career ==
Hardcastle was in the Wakefield Trinity Wildcats junior system and played in the Challenge Cup for the Featherstone Lions.

He has also played in Australia for the Whitsunday Brahmans in an amateur Queensland competition.

Hardcastle played for Featherstone in their 2021 Million Pound Game loss against Toulouse Olympique.
