= Stuart Dickens =

English rugby league footballer

Personal information
- Born: 23 August 1980 (age 45) Wakefield, West Yorkshire, England

Playing information
- Position: Prop
Club
Years	Team	Pld	T	G	FG	P
1998–04	Featherstone Rovers	212	20	208	2	498
2005	Salford City Reds	10	1	4	0	12
2005–12	Featherstone Rovers	209	51	424	0	1052
	Total	431	72	636	2	1562

Stuart Dickens is an English former professional rugby league footballer who played in the 1990s and 2000s. He spent almost his entire career playing for Featherstone Rovers (captain), primarily as a goal-kicking prop. Dickens also played for Salford City Reds in the Super League after signing for them from Featherstone Rovers where he had been for 9-years. He played nine times that season, in which Salford were relegated, kicking four goals. He remained in this division ever since, opting not to try to regain first-grade action in Super League. He is now head of player Wellbeing at Wakefield Trinity

== Playing career ==
Dickens made his début for Featherstone Rovers on Sunday 15 March 1998.

=== First Division Grand Final appearances ===
Dickens played at prop in Featherstone Rovers' 22–24 defeat by Wakefield Trinity in the 1998 First Division Grand Final at the McAlpine Stadium, Huddersfield on 26 September 1998.

=== Testimonial match ===
Stuart Dickens' benefit season/testimonial match at Featherstone Rovers took place during the 2007 season.

== Coaching career ==
After retiring from playing in 2012, Dickens joined the coaching staff at Wakefield Trinity Wildcats.

== Honoured at Featherstone Rovers ==
Stuart Dickens is a Featherstone Rovers Hall of Fame inductee.
