= Joe Mullaney (rugby league) =

England international rugby league footballer

Personal information
- Full name: Joseph Mullaney
- Born: c. 1934 Wakefield district, England
- Died: December 2015 (aged 81)

Playing information
- Position: Stand-off
Club
Years	Team	Pld	T	G	FG	P
1953–65	Featherstone Rovers	319	85	7	0	269
Representative
Years	Team	Pld	T	G	FG	P
1954–57	Yorkshire	4	4	0	0	12
1955	England	1	1	0	0	3

Joseph Mullaney (c. 1934 – December 2015) was an English professional rugby league footballer who played in the 1950s and 1960s. He played at representative level for England, and at club level for Featherstone Rovers (captain), as an occasional goal-kicking stand-off.

== Background ==
Joe Mullaney's birth was registered in Wakefield district, West Riding of Yorkshire, England.

== Playing career ==
=== Club career ===
Mullaney made his début for Featherstone Rovers on Saturday 15 August 1953.

Mullaney played stand-off, and was captain in Featherstone Rovers' 15–14 victory over Hull F.C. in the 1959–60 Yorkshire Cup Final during the 1959–60 season at Headingley, Leeds on Saturday 31 October 1959.

Joe Mullaney's benefit season/testimonial match at Featherstone Rovers took place during the 1963–64 season.

=== Representative honours ===
Joe Mullaney won a cap for England while at Featherstone Rovers in 1955 against Other Nationalities.

Joe Mullaney won caps for Yorkshire while at Featherstone Rovers; during the 1954–55 season against Cumberland and Lancashire, during the 1955–56 season against New Zealand, and during the 1957–58 season against Cumberland.

== Honours ==
Joe Mullaney is a Featherstone Rovers Hall of Fame inductee.
