= Super League licensing =

Super League Licensing
- League: Super League
- Duration: 3 Years

Licence
- Awarded to: (2009-2011); Celtic Crusaders; Salford City Reds (2012-2014); Widnes Vikings

Licensing was introduced in 2009 as an alternative to automatic promotion and relegation. It was supposed to improve the stadiums, finances and quality of teams in the Super League.

== History ==
=== 2009–11 ===
The licensing system was announced by the Rugby Football League (RFL) in May 2005 to improve the overall quality of the Super League and make it more like the NRL as being a closed competition. The last season of promotion and relegation was in 2007 and from then on clubs had to apply for a licence to compete in Super League from 2009-2011.

The RFL set certain criteria that needed to be met to be awarded a licence. Three different licences were awarded; A, B and C licence. A points system was used to decide which licence a club would be awarded based on the criteria they meet. Clubs could still be expelled from Super League if they under performed or broke the contract of the licence. Teams that were awarded a licence were given feedback on things they should change and improve for the next licensing period. For the 2009–11 Super League licences period Salford City Reds and Celtic Crusaders were awarded a C licence and elevated to Super League. The 2009-11 licences were:

Super League Licences
A licence	B licence	C licence
Hull F.C.	Bradford Bulls	Castleford Tigers
Leeds Rhinos	St. Helens	Celtic Crusaders †
Warrington Wolves	Wigan Warriors	Catalans Dragons
		Harlequins
Hull Kingston Rovers
Huddersfield Giants
Salford City Reds †
Wakefield Trinity Wildcats

†	Team elevated to Super League

=== 2012–14 ===
For the second period of licensing, 2012–14, all 14 Super League clubs were allowed to apply with no criteria to meet but some clubs had been warned about improvement they promised to deliver for the 2012 season. Championship clubs could apply if they met certain criteria such as playing in the 2009 or 2010 Grand Finals or won the Championship Cup. Five Championship clubs were eligible to apply for a licence but only three applied. Only one Championship club, Widnes Vikings, was promoted although Halifax were awarded a licence but not promoted and Barrow Raiders did not meet all of the criteria. There was much debate about which Super League team would be relegated and how many teams would be promoted until Celtic Crusaders withdrew their application and went into administration. The full licences were given to:

Super League Licences
A licence	B licence	C licence
Hull F.C.	Bradford Bulls	Castleford Tigers
Leeds Rhinos	St. Helens	Widnes Vikings †
Warrington Wolves	Catalans Dragons	Halifax ‡
Wigan Warriors	Huddersfield Giants	Harlequins
	Hull Kingston Rovers	Salford City Reds
		Wakefield Trinity Wildcats

†	Team elevated to Super League
‡	Awarded licence but not promoted

It was announced in 2013 that the RFL had chosen to scrap licensing and bring back promotion and relegation for 2015 which resulted in a major restructure of the British rugby league system.

== Criticism ==
Licensing was first criticised when it was announced in 2005 with Championship clubs calling the Super League a closed shop and that Championship clubs had no incentive to compete at a high level and that most of the talent in the Championship was going to leave to play in Super League, therefore widening the gap between Super League and Championship.

It was also criticised as teams at the bottom end had potentially nothing to play for if they could not reach the play-offs and there is no threat of relegation which meant an increase in uncompetitive games.

In 2011 the RFL was criticised for only elevating one team to Super League after Crusaders folded. Many clubs thought Wakefield Trinity Wildcats should have been relegated as they had struggled in Super League and had previously had financial difficulties and not developed or built a new stadium.

== See also ==
- IMG Grading, a system resembling licensing that was introduced to the Super League in 2024
