= Danny Evans (rugby league) =

English RL coach and former rugby league footballer

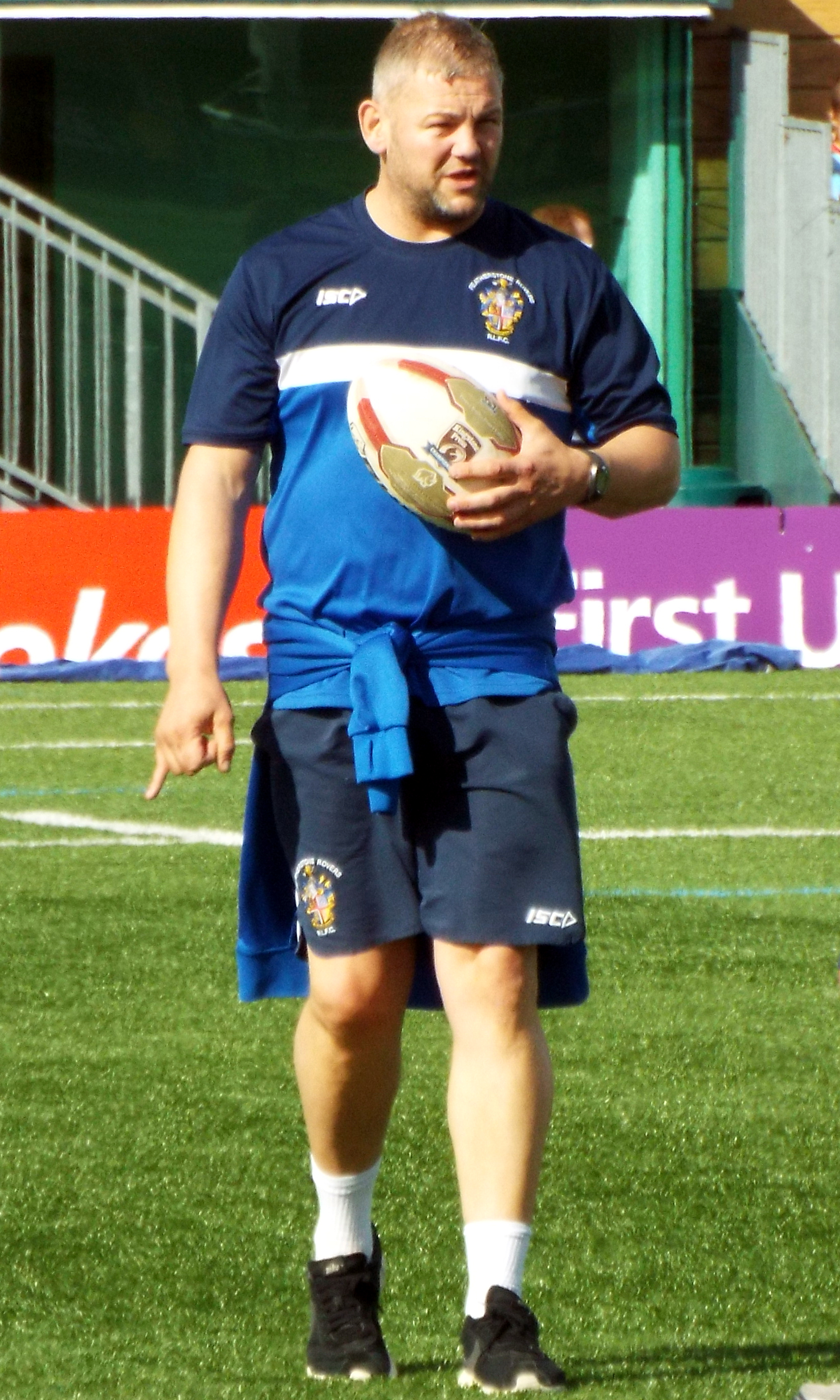

Personal information
- Full name: Daniel Evans
- Born: 15 October 1974 (age 50); Featherstone, West Yorkshire, England

Playing information
Club
Years	Team	Pld	T	G	FG	P
1995–01	Featherstone Rovers	146	8	0	0	32
1995(loan)	→Hunslet RLFC	4	0	0	0	0
2003–04	Dewsbury	5	0	0	0	0
2003(loan)	→Batley Bulldogs	14	1	0	0	4
2005	Featherstone Rovers	23	1	0	0	4
	Total	192	10	0	0	40

Coaching information
Club
Years	Team	Gms	W	D	L	W%
2008	Featherstone Rovers	8	3	1	4	38
2013	Featherstone Rovers	8	6	0	2	75
2014	Featherstone Rovers	1	1	0	0	100
	Total	17	10	1	6	59
- Source: As of 2 Jun 2025

Danny Evans is an English former professional rugby league footballer who played in the 1990s and 2000s, and has coached in the 2000s and 2010s. He is the assistant coach of Featherstone Rovers in the Kingstone Press Championship. He has had three stints as temporary head coach at Featherstone Rovers.

== Background ==
Danny Evans was born in Featherstone, West Yorkshire, England.

== Playing career ==
Evans has played for Featherstone Rovers (captain) and the Dewsbury Rams.

== Testimonial match ==
Danny Evans's benefit season/testimonial match at Featherstone Rovers took place during the 2002 season.

Sporting positions
Preceded by John Bastian; 2014	Coach (interim) Featherstone Rovers; 2014	Succeeded by Andy Hay; 2014–2015
Preceded by Ryan Sheridan; 2013	Coach (interim) Featherstone Rovers; 2013	Succeeded by John Bastian; 2014
Preceded by David Hobbs; 2005–2008	Coach (interim) Featherstone Rovers; 2008	Succeeded by Daryl Powell; 2008–2013
