= Luke Cooper =

English rugby league footballer

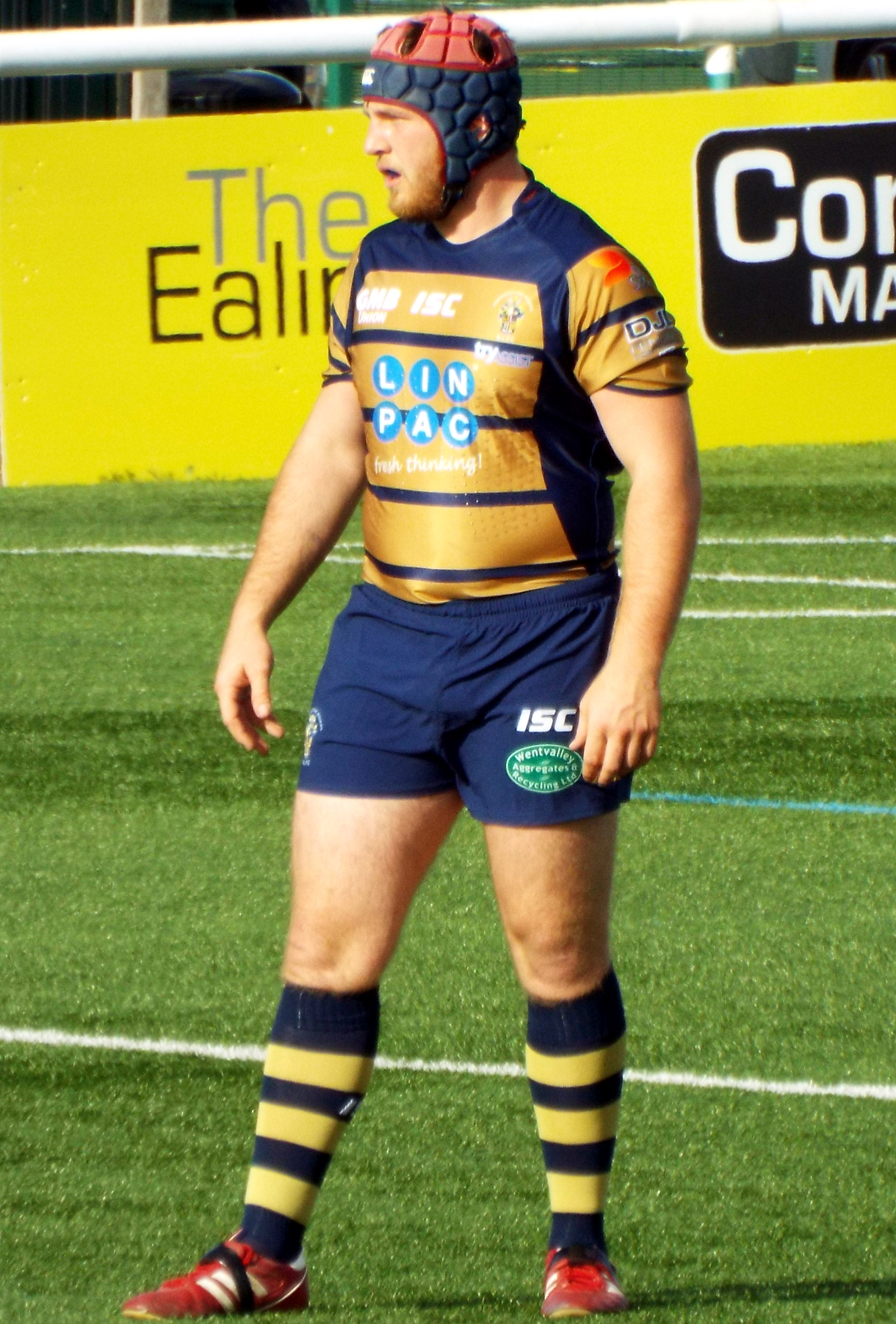

Personal information
- Full name: Luke Cooper
- Born: 28 July 1994 (age 32) Batley, West Yorkshire, England
- Height: 6 ft 0 in (1.82 m)
- Weight: 16 st 1 lb (102 kg)

Playing information
- Position: Prop, Second-row
Club
Years	Team	Pld	T	G	FG	P
2015–23	Featherstone Rovers	151	40	1	0	42
2023(loan)	→ Doncaster RLFC	13	3	0	0	12
2024–2026	Batley Bulldogs	53	7	0	0	28
	Total	217	50	1	0	82
- Source: As of 4 February 2024

Luke Cooper (born 28 July 1994) is an English former professional rugby league footballer who last played as a prop or second-row for the Batley Bulldogs in the RFL Championship. He previously played for Featherstone Rovers from 2015 to 2023.

== Background ==
Cooper was born in Batley, West Yorkshire, England.

== Playing career ==
=== Batley Bulldogs ===
On 12 Oct 2023 it was reported that he had signed for Batley Bulldogs in the RFL Championship

On 27 February 2026, it was announced he was retiring with immediate effect following the game against Swinton Lions on 1 March 2026 due to personal reasons.
