= James Lockwood (rugby league) =

English rugby league footballer

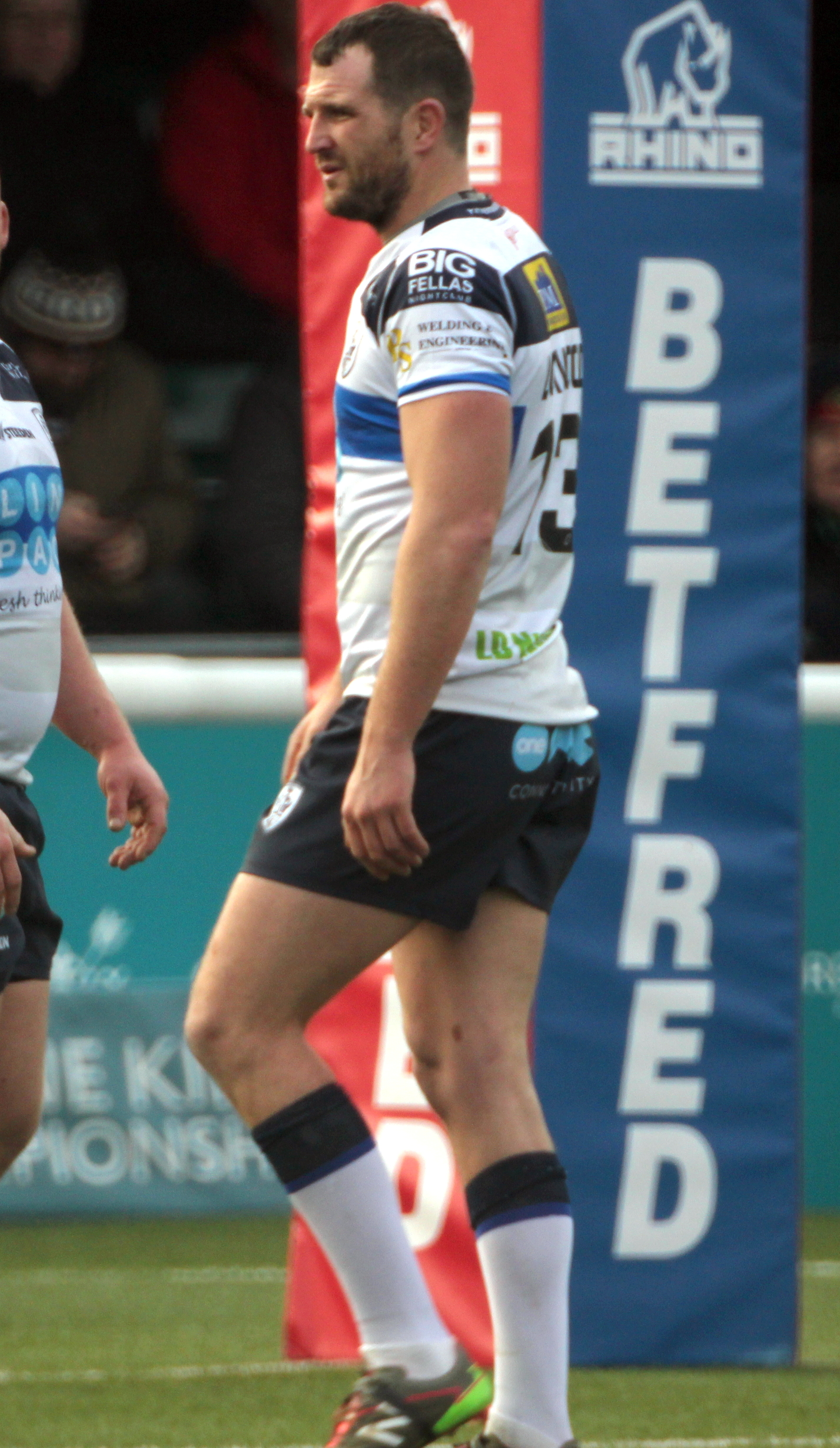

Personal information
- Full name: James Lockwood
- Born: 21 March 1986 (age 39); Wakefield, West Yorkshire, England

Playing information
- Height: 6 ft 2 in (1.88 m)
- Weight: 14 st 5 lb (91 kg)
- Position: Second-row, Prop, Loose forward
Club
Years	Team	Pld	T	G	FG	P
2009–11	Dewsbury Rams	57	7	0	0	28
2012–23	Featherstone Rovers	257	39	0	0	156
2024	Featherstone Rovers	0	0	0	0	0
	Total	314	46	0	0	184

James Lockwood (born 21 March 1986) is a former professional rugby league player who played as a prop or second-row forward. He is currently an assistant coach at Championship side Featherstone Rovers

He also played at club level for the Dewsbury Rams.

== Background ==
Lockwood was born in Wakefield, West Yorkshire, England.

== Playing career ==
=== Featherstone Rovers ===
On 21 April 2015 it was reported that Lockwood had been banned for two years after breaching the Rugby Football League's anti-doping regulations. In June 2019 Lockwood committed to a two-year contract extension Lockwood played for Featherstone in their 2021 Million Pound Game loss against Toulouse Olympique. On 28 May 2022, Lockwood played for Featherstone in their 2022 RFL 1895 Cup final loss against Leigh. Lockwood retired at the end of the 2023 season.
