= Featherstone Rovers =

English professional rugby league club

Club information
- Full name: Featherstone Rovers Rugby League Football Club
- Nicknames: The Colliers; The Flat Cappers
- Short name: Fev
- Colours: Navy blue and White
- Founded: 1889; 137 years ago as Featherstone Trinity RUFC
- Exited: 2026; 0 years ago
- Readmitted: 2026; 0 years ago
- Website: featherstonerovers.co.uk

details
- Ground: Post Office Road (9,850)
- Chairman: Paddy Handley
- Coach: Paul Cooke
- Captain: tbc
- 2025 season: 6th
- Current season

Uniforms
Home colours	Away colours

Records
- Championships: 1 (1977)
- Challenge Cups: 3 (1967, 1973, 1983)
- Other honours: 2

Featherstone Rovers are a professional rugby league club in Featherstone, West Yorkshire, England. They compete in the RFL Championship, the second tier of British rugby league.

The club were denied RFL membership for the 2026 season due to the club's financial difficulties. However, on November 18th, 2026 it was announced that Featherstone had been readmitted to the RFL Championship for the 2027 season under a new consortium.

Featherstone Rovers have won the League Championship once and Challenge Cup three times.

The club plays home games at Post Office Road. Their local rivals are Castleford Tigers, Wakefield Trinity and Halifax Panthers. The club's traditional home colours are navy blue with narrow white hoops.

== History ==
=== 1889–1902: Origins ===
Featherstone Trinity RUFC were formed in 1889. Featherstone Trinity played their first game on the New Inn fields against Castleford Mill Lane Rovers. The following season in 1890, Featherstone went 19 games without defeat. They dropped the Trinity from their name to become simply Featherstone RUFC in 1894. Featherstone voted to join the Northern Union in 1898 and became the town's first rugby league team. Featherstone played in the following competitions the Charlesworth Cup (1889 to 1905), the Dunhill Cup (1890 to 1894) and the Yorkshire Second Competition (1898 to 1902). They folded in 1902.

=== 1902–1945: Foundation ===
A new club, Featherstone Rovers, was formed in the Railway Hotel in 1902, reformed in 1906 and joined the Northern Union in 1907. Initially the club played in the Dewsbury, Wakefield & District League (1919 to 1921) as well as the Yorkshire Combination (1905 to 1912) and The Yorkshire Junior Cup (1909 to 1921). The club was originally made up of local miners and between 1912 and 1913 played at the Featherstone Main Colliery Welfare Ground. In 1913 Featherstone Rovers merged with Purston White Horse.

To bolster the ranks of the war time league, Featherstone Rovers along with Brighouse Rangers and St Helens Recs were promoted from district leagues to join the senior clubs for the duration of the conflict, although Featherstone only lasted one season.

After the First World War, Featherstone took part in the Leeds & District League (1913 to 1921) and the Wakefield & District League (1919 to 1921).

Featherstone became a semi-professional club on 14 June 1921, beating Bradford Northern in their first game as a senior club. Their first game at Post Office Road attracted 4,000 fans. The finished 24th in their first season. They then finished 12th, 23rd, 17th, 15th, 11th and 3rd in 1927–28

Rovers reached the Championship final after just seven seasons, losing 11–0 to Swinton in the 1928 final. Rovers ended the 1928–29 season finishing 25th, although they reached a cup final, beaten by Leeds in the Yorkshire Cup decider. The 1930s were a poor decade for Featherstone, finishing in the bottom half of the league in every season, and finishing bottom three times.

Rovers' first major silverware was won in 1939–40, when they lifted the Yorkshire County Cup. They finished 7th in the Yorkshire Emergency War League both in 1939–40 and 1940–41. The counties united in 1941–42 and Rovers finished 12th. They were a mid table side during these few years finishing 8th, 13th and 14th.

=== Post-war ===
As Rovers emerged from the Second World War in 1945, results were not as good as hoped finishing 13th in the first season post-war, they then finished in bottom few places in the league for the next few years. After two seasons in charge, former player Bill Sherwood gave way to a new coach, and the committee decided to go for a big name, which turned out to be Stan Smith.

Rovers made a bright start and won their opening three fixtures, however, after beating Batley in November, Rovers lost 24 straight games and won only once more in the rest of the season, by which time Stan Smith had left the club. Bill Sherwood re-assumed the coaching role for three more seasons until 1951.

Eric Batten came in as player-coach in the summer of 1951. From rock bottom strugglers, Featherstone were gradually transformed into a fit and competitive side, capable of matching the best in the league on their day. Rovers' first visit to Wembley Stadium was in the 1952 Challenge Cup Final, the first to be televised. They were defeated 18–10 by Workington Town in front of a crowd of 72,093.

In the summer of 1956 Rovers allowed Batten to leave the club and appointed a new coach, Bill Hudson. Hudson left towards the end of the season in March. The explanation being that Hudson could no longer commit himself to the job having moved out of the local area. Rovers decided against appointing a new coach mid-season and played out the 1956–57 season without a coach.

Harold Moxon took over and Rovers finished 8th in the league, up from 15th the previous season. In subsequent years, Rovers came 13th, 5th, 9th, 3rd and 11th. The club had previously managed a top ten finish on just three occasions (in 1928, 1955 and 1956). Rovers managed four Challenge Cup semi-finals in five years but lost all of them. They did, however, win the Yorkshire Cup in 1959 after a tight victory over Hull; the last time Rovers ever won that famous old trophy before it was abandoned in 1993. Just eleven days after that success, Rovers beat Australia 23–15 in a tour match.

In 1959, the club's record attendance was set at 17,531 for a third round Challenge Cup match against St. Helens. This was more than the population of the village of Featherstone

Moxon's coaching career ended in the summer of 1963.

=== 1960s ===
Johnny Malpass took over as coach of the Featherstone Rovers in August 1963. In his first season, Malpass steered Rovers to fourth in the table, other highlights that year included beating the Australian tourists for a second successive time. The next seasons Rovers finished 15th and Malpass quit as coach after a heavy defeat by St Helens in the play-offs.

Laurie Gant took over from Johnny Malpass as Rovers coach in the summer of 1966. Rovers finished 20th in the league in 1966–67 but Rovers' won the Challenge Cup in 1967. Despite their lowly league position they defeated Bradford Northern, Wakefield Trinity, Castleford and Leeds to get to Wembley Stadium. Barrow provided the opposition in the final where a crowd of 77,000 paid a then record £54,435 to watch the game. Rovers won the match 17–12. Only Widnes in 1937 had accomplished the feat from a lower position in the league table. Featherstone Rovers also reached the final of the Yorkshire Cup but were beaten 25–12 by Hull Kingston Rovers.

In 1968–69 the side finally began to put together some consistent league form and finished 7th followed by 8th the following year and a Yorkshire Cup final defeat 12–9 to Hull. Rovers featured in a 1969 BBC documentary 'The Game that Got Away' which profiled the state of rugby league in 1969 and the on and off-field fortunes of Rovers.

=== 1970s ===
They reached the Yorkshire Cup final again in 1970, losing to Leeds 23–7.

Peter Fox took over as coach mid-season from Laurie Gant in December 1970. He won only six games of his first 22 in charge but Rovers recovered to finish seventh in the league the following season.

This was followed by a then best ever finish of second in 1973. Rovers repeated the feat of six years earlier, when Bradford Northern were beaten 33–14 in the 1973 Challenge Cup final. Cyril Kellett's 8-goals for Featherstone Rovers against Bradford Northern in the final is still a record that has only been matched by Iestyn Harris for Leeds Rhinos against London Broncos 1999 final.

The following season Rovers dropped back to eighth but enjoyed a Wembley return to the 1974 Challenge Cup final. Following a defeat by Warrington, Fox left and was replaced by former player Tommy Smales.

In 1974–75 Tommy Smales quit due to the pressures of work, and Rovers turned to Keith Goulding. They then finished 8th, 4th and were runners up again in 1975–76, pipped by just a single point to the title, coach Keith Goulding leaving mid-season to be replaced by another Tommy Smales, unrelated to the coach of the same name who had been in charge of Featherstone a few years earlier.

Keith Cotton took over, as Smales stepped down, in the summer of 1976. Rovers were crowned Division One champions in 1976–77, their greatest season, winning 21 games out of 30 and finishing 5 points clear of nearest rivals St Helens. They also reached the Yorkshire Cup final, losing to Leeds 16–12.

In 1977–78 Rovers finished 7th and again reached the Yorkshire Cup final but were beaten 17–7 by Castleford. Head coach Keith Cotton quit and Keith Goulding filled in for the rest of 1977–78. Rovers persuaded veteran forward Terry Clawson to take on the player-coach's role. Rovers won just two of their first ten games. A heavy loss at Rochdale convinced everyone it was time for a change and Clawson quit. He was replaced by former club loose forward Tommy Smales. They were relegated only two years after their title win.

=== 1980s and early 1990s ===
Featherstone won promotion from the Second Division in 1980 under coach Paul Daley. Featherstone Rovers secured the first ever British rugby league shirt sponsorship deal during the 1981–82 season. LinPac Packaging appeared on the Featherstone Rovers jersey and were the main sponsor of the club until 1989. Daley resigned in January 1981 despite Rovers winning ten of their opening 16 fixtures and in came Vince Farrar. Featherstone did just enough to stay up in the end finishing just two points ahead of relegated Halifax.

Rovers made a poor start in the league were facing relegation when Vince Farrar was sacked in November 1982. Allan Agar joined Featherstone as captain-coach in December; Featherstone Rovers won the Challenge Cup as underdogs on 7 May 1983 beating Hull F.C. 14–12 in front of an 84,969 Wembley crowd. Steve Quinn secured their victory with a late penalty goal.

The following season (1984–85) saw a slight upturn in the club's fortunes whilst off-field the town struggled through the miners' strike of 1984–85. The club allowed pass holders in for that season free with the understanding they would pay for their passes when the strike had ended. David Hobbs was sold to Oldham to balance the club's books. When the following season started in a similar vein, a heavy defeat at Wigan triggered the resignation of Allan Agar.

George Pieniazek arrived as replacement, Rovers had started the 1985–86 season badly but managed to stay up under their new coach. Rovers started the next season badly as well and Pieniazek was sacked in November. Paul Daley came in as coach for the second time but failed to turn the team around mid-season and Featherstone Rovers were relegated in April 1987 for the second time in their history.

Peter Fox returned to the club for a second spell as coach in 1987 and stayed until 1991. They won promotion at the first attempt in 1987–88 before finishing 6th on their return to the top-flight. Featherstone sold Post Office Road to the local council in February 1988. In 1989 Rovers reached the Yorkshire Cup final for the 10th and last time losing 20–14 to Bradford Northern. Another successful league campaign in 1990–91 saw Rovers finish 7th and go to the semi-finals of the Premiership with a famous win at all-conquering Wigan.

Not long into the following season, Fox accepted the offer of a job at Bradford, the club turned once again to former captain-coach Allan Agar. Rovers struggled for consistency through the rest of 1991–92 and then were relegated on points difference through a remarkable combination of results on the final day of the season. Steve Martin became the coach and Rovers won the Second Division title in 1992–93.

They finished 11th in their return to the top division in 1993–94. Martin was sacked and replaced by David Ward. Despite finishing 11th in the league, and appearing in the Challenge Cup semi-final, Rovers were demoted in 1995 to make way for the new "Super League".

=== 1996–2006: Summer era and financial difficulties ===
In 1996, the first tier of British rugby league clubs played the inaugural Super League season and changed from a winter to a summer season. When a Rupert Murdoch-funded Super League competition was proposed, part of the deal was that some traditional clubs would merge. Featherstone Rovers were asked to merge with local rivals Castleford and Wakefield Trinity to form a new club, Calder, which would compete in the Super League. Trinity's shareholders voted 2:1 in favour of a merger but Featherstone's members voted against by a large margin and this was resisted.

In 1995 Rovers finished 11th in the 16-team First Division but were effectively relegated to make way for London Broncos and Paris Saint-Germain. They reached the semi-finals of the Challenge Cup in 1995 before losing to Leeds 39–22. They finished 5th in the 1st Division of the centenary season of 1995–96, followed by 4th in the first summer season. A poor start to the 1997 season led Ward to offer his resignation, which the club reluctantly accepted.

Steve Simms came in as coach and after finishing 7th in 1997, Featherstone went within a whisker of gaining Super League status in 1998. They were beaten 24–22 by neighbours Wakefield Trinity in the promotion-deciding inaugural First Division grand final. When it became apparent that funds would not be available to continue the push for Super League in 1999, Simms resigned.

Assistant coach Kevin Hobbs took over; at the beginning of the 1999 season a new side had to be built. A decent start saw Rovers win five straight league games, but then lose the next three. After defeat at Doncaster, Kevin Hobbs quit his post, citing verbal abuse his family had received from some fans.

Peter Roe was in charge of Featherstone from 1999 to October 2001, before leaving to take charge of Wakefield Trinity. Under him, Rovers finished 5th in 1999 and 2000 and 4th in 2001. He was replaced by his assistant Ian Fairhurst.

After finishing 5th again, in November 2002, Featherstone went into administration, owing the Inland Revenue £97,000 and with total debts of £403,000.

In September 2003, Andy Kelly's contract was not renewed following their failure to reach the National League One play-offs for the first time in six years, finishing 7th.

Rovers again finished 5th in 2004, and after heroically beating Hull Kingston Rovers 19–18 in the play-offs, lost to Whitehaven in the Final eliminator.

In 2005, David Hobbs was appointed coach of Featherstone Rovers half-way through the season after Gary Price left, he failed to save Rovers from relegation to National League Two.

In late 2006, the "Friends of Featherstone" were formed, their main aim being to provide money for contracts for players to ensure that Rovers gained promotion to National League One. The money raised enabled Rovers to sign players such as Paul Handforth, Chris Ross, Tom Haughey, Jamie Field and Loz Wildbore.

Their first season in the third tier of Rugby League was not a success, finishing 4th and losing to Swinton in the play-offs.

=== 2007–2008: Promotion to the Championship ===
In 2007 after finishing runners up in the league to big spending Crusaders, Rovers won promotion back to National League One (The Second level on the pyramid) from National League Two after a two-year absence with a 24–6 win over Oldham at Headingley.

Featherstone finished 8th on their return to the second tier of Rugby League.

As of the start of the 2009 season clubs wishing to participate in the Super League competition have to gain a licence granted by the Rugby Football League removing promotion to and relegation from the top tier. Featherstone did apply for the first round of licences though with the popular view this would not be successful and could be used as a learning experience for future bids. In July 2008 the RFL made its decision selection all current Super League teams plus two from the National Leagues, Salford and Celtic Crusaders.

In November 2010 it was announced by Rovers that they would not be applying for a super league licence for the 2012 season. Although Rovers have ambitions to play in Super League, they say they are not yet in a position to apply for a licence. They accept they have to increase their support base before they are able to make a realistic application.

=== 2009–2013: Daryl Powell era ===
Daryl Powell was appointed coach in September 2008 and coached Rovers throughout the 2009 season. After finishing 6th and only just getting in the play-offs Rovers beat Sheffield Eagles and Widnes away before a 32–30 loss in the final eliminator to Halifax.

In 2010, Rovers finished first in the league table with a 100% away record and claimed the League Leaders' Shield. They reached the Championship Grand Final by beating Halifax 46–16 in the semi-final. They went on to lose the final to Halifax 23–22 in extra time. The close season saw the departure of club chief executive Andy Prout to be replaced by Stuart Sheard.

In 2011 Featherstone went one better than 2010 by beating Sheffield Eagles 40–4 in the Grand Final at the Halliwell Jones Stadium in Warrington as well as retaining the League Leaders' Shield in the regular season.

On 14 April 2012 Featherstone beat their local rivals Castleford 23–16 in the Challenge Cup 4th round. The victory, the first for a lower-league side over a Super League club since Barrow defeated Cas in 2010, was televised nationally on Sky Sports. Rovers hosted Cup holders Wigan in the fifth round, putting up a competitive display, and making Wigan work hard before succumbing to a 32–16 defeat. They reached the final of the Northern Rail Cup for the first time, losing to Halifax 21–15. They won the League Leaders' Shield for the third year in a row, before losing in the grand final 20–16 to Sheffield Eagles.

2013 started brightly, challenging for the title again with impressive league wins against rivals Halifax and Batley as well as a memorable narrow Challenge Cup defeat by Super League London Broncos. Daryl Powell, the most successful coach in the clubs recent history, left the club on 5 May.

=== 2014–present: Super League bid ===
After Daryl Powell left, a string of coaches followed. Ryan Sheridan was in charge for 8 games, before Sean Long took over as football manager with Danny Evans as first team coach. Together they helped the club win the League Leaders' Shield again before losing the play off semi final in extra time to Batley. John Bastien then took over for 2014 but was sacked after 11 games and a number of poor performances.

In mid-2014 the RFL announced a new structure to be in place for the 2015 season. Super League was to be reduced to 12 teams, with 12 teams in the Championship and 14 in League 1. Promotion and relegation was to be brought back via a 'qualifier' league at the end of the season where the bottom four teams in Super League and the top four teams in the Championship would play each other to determine who would be in Super League the following season.

Andy Hay was appointed as head coach in May 2014. Despite off-field turmoil, he managed to guide the club to 2nd place in the league and a place in the Grand Final against Leigh, although they lost 36–12. An inconsistent run of results led him to be sacked in July 2015.

Jon Sharp took over and having missed out on the top four, won the Championship Shield in his first year in charge, defeating London Broncos 36–4. In 2016, Rovers finished in the top 4, although they lost all seven games in the qualifiers. Rovers again reached the top four in 2017, however Sharp was sacked with one game remaining in the regular season.

In the 2019 Championship season, Featherstone reached the Million Pound Game against Toronto Wolfpack but were defeated 24–6. On 10 October 2021, Featherstone once again reached the Million Pound Game with the opponents this time being French side Toulouse Olympique. Featherstone trailed 16–0 at half-time before losing the match 34–12. On 28 May 2022, Featherstone reached the final of the 2022 RFL 1895 Cup against Leigh but lost 30–16.

In October 2022, Featherstone appointed Sean Long as their new head coach. On 7 August 2023, Featherstone terminated Long as head coach despite the club sitting eight points clear on the top of the RFL Championship table.

==== Financial troubles ====
On 3 June 2024, Featherstone were hit with a winding up petition due to unpaid debts. It was also reported that players had not had their wages paid on time. In the 2025 RFL Championship season, Featherstone finished 6th on the table.

In late September 2025, the club failed to pay players and staff on time, prompting growing fears that Featherstone Rovers were heading into administration. Reports indicated that salaries due in September had not been delivered, and if payment was not made by the 5 pm deadline, players and staff risked being released as free agents. The club was also facing a winding-up petition by HM Revenue and Customs (HMRC) over an unpaid tax bill reportedly around £120,000.

On 9 December 2025 it was reported that the club had submitted an application to enter administration on the eve of a HMRC hearing in the High Court, with their immediate future uncertain. The club went into administration on 15 December 2025 with the RFL setting a deadline of 19 December for interested parties to submit a bid to buy the club.

Only one bid was submitted but this bid failed to meet RFL needs.

On 9 January 2026 the RFL announced that the club would not be able to participate in the 2026 Championship.

==== New consortium and readmittance to the RFL Championship ====
On 18 November 2026, Featherstone Rovers were readmitted to the RFL Championship for the 2027 season under FR 2027 Ltd, a consortium led by Paddy Handley and Chris Brereton. Wakefield Council had provided £500,000 to help reestablish the club.

== Kit sponsors and manufacturers ==
Year	Kit Manufacturer	Main Shirt Sponsor
1990–1992	Ellgren	Copy Consultants Group
1992–1994	Ellgren	Beazer Homes
1994–1995	CICA	Beazer Homes
1995–1996	CICA	RJB Mining
1996–1998	Stag	RJB Mining
1999–2000	Stag	Lionheart
2001	Patrick	Lionheart
2002–2003	ISC	UK Coal
2004–2005	Kooga	Unison
2006–2007	Kooga	Frontline
2008–2009	Prostar	Frontline
2010	Macron	Harris Construction Management
2011–2014	Macron	Probiz
2015-2016	XBlades	Linpac Packaging
2016–2018	ISC	Linpac Packaging
2018–2021	Steeden Sports	KLÖCKNER PENTAPLAST (Linpac Packaging)
2022	Hummel	KLÖCKNER PENTAPLAST (Linpac Packaging)

== Stadium ==
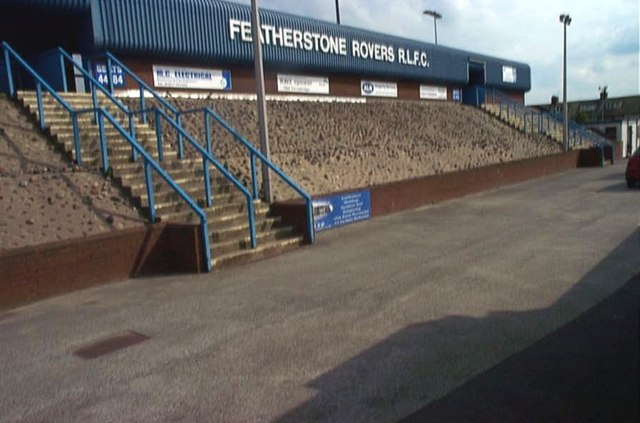

Late 2008 saw a major announcement in the history of Featherstone Rovers, a possible move away from Post Office Road. Featherstone are in a rare situation, that they own an expanse of land around the current stadium. The proposed development would include a supermarket, community sports facilities and a purpose-built 12,000 capacity stadium though this could be reduced to a 6,500 modular design. Should it be needed the capacity can be increased to the required 12,000 if the club bid successfully for 2015 or 2018. Though more recent plans on the website state that the club "see the provision of a 21st century stadium through the enhancement (and movement!) of the existing Post Office Road pitch, development and provision of new stands and integral function and educational suites which will enable us to build on our existing and unique award winning community programmes."

== Colours and badge ==
=== Colours ===
Featherstone's traditional playing colours are navy blue and white. They usually play in navy blue with narrow white hoops.

=== Badge ===

Featherstone used the town's coat of arms as their badge until 2009 when a new club crest was introduced. The new badge was less traditional with a pirate, the club's mascot and Rovers underneath in the club's colours. In 2014 the club reverted to using the town's coat of arms but had it in blue and white with the year the club was founded, 1921 within it.

== 2027 squad ==
2027 Featherstone Rovers squad
First team squad	Coaching staff
	Head coach: (England) Paul Cooke; Assistant coach: (Ireland) Ged Corcoran; Legend: (c) Captain(s); (vc) Vice-captain(s)

== Notable players ==
=== Hall of Fame ===
The following players were inducted into Featherstone Rovers' Hall of Fame. The number in brackets indicates the year in which the player was inducted.

- John Keith Bridges (2003)
- Vince Farrar (2003)
- Keith Bell (2009)
- Jack "Jackie" Fennell (2009)
- Les Tonks (2009)
- Carl Dooler (2010)
- Deryck Fox (2010)
- David Hobbs (2010)
- Stuart Dickens (2012)
- Cliff Lambert (2014)
- Arnie Morgan (2014)
- John Newlove (2014)
- Mike Smith (2014)
- Cyril Woolford (2014)
- Paul Coventry (2015)
- Peter Fox (2015)
- Paul Newlove (2015)
- Charlie Stone (2015)
- Brendon Tuuta
- Steve Quinn
- Steve Nash (2016)
- Jimmy Thompson
- Don Fox
- Joe Mullaney
- Jim Denton
- Eric Batten
- Freddie Miller
- Peter Smith
- Jack Hirst
- Malcolm Dixon

=== Club captains ===
Season (From)	Season (To)	captain	Vice-captain
2024-season		Danny Addy	Ben Reynolds
2018	2023	James Lockwood	
2017–season		Ian Hardman	Misi Taulapapa
2016–season		Tim Spears	Ian Hardman
2015–season		Tim Spears	Paul Sykes
2014–season		Tim Spears	
2013–season		Liam Finn	
2006	2012	Stuart Dickens	
2005–season		Nathan Sykes	
2004–season		Ian Tonks	
2002–season		Richard Chapman	
2001–season		Danny Evans	
2000–season		Matt Lambert	
1999–season		Carl Hall	
1998–season		Shaun Irwin	
1995–96 season	1997–season	Steve Molloy	
1994–95 season	1995–96 season	Mark Aston, and Steve Molloy	
1993–94 season	1994–95 season	Richard Gunn	
1992–93 season	1993–94 season	Richard Gunn, and Mark Wilson	
1985–86 season	1991–92 season	Deryck Fox	
1984–85 season	1985–86 season	Terry Hudson, and Deryck Fox	
1982–83 season	1983–84 season	Terry Hudson	
1981–82 season	1982–83 season	Keith Bell	Peter Smith
1980–81 season	1981–82 season	Mick Morgan	Peter Smith
1979–80 season	1980–81 season	Keith Bell	
1978–79 season		Terry Clawson, and Keith Bell	
1977–78 season		Vince Farrar, and Terry Clawson	
1975–76 season	1976–77 season	Vince Farrar	
1974–75 season		John Newlove, and Vince Farrar	
1972–73 season	1973–74 season	John Newlove	
1970–71 season	1971–72 season	Cyril Kellett	
1966–67 season	1969–70 season	Malcolm Dixon	
1965–66 season		Don Fox	Malcolm Dixon
1963–64 season	1964–65 season	Don Fox	
1962–63 season		Gary Cooper	Don Fox
1961–62 season		Joe Mullaney	Don Fox
1960–61 season		Joe Mullaney	Colin Clifft
1959–60 season		Joe Mullaney	
1958–59 season		Don Fox, and Joe Mullaney	Clifford "Cliff" Lambert
1956–57 season	1957–58 season	Unknown	
1955–56 season	1956–57 season	Donald "Don" Metcalfe	
1954–55 season	1955–56 season	Unknown	
1950–51 season	1953–54 season	Eric Batten	
1949–50 season	1950–51 season	Jimmy Russell	
1948–49 season		Walter Best	
1940–41 season	1947–48 season	Unknown	
1939–40 season		Wilf Pearson, and Harold Moxon	
1929–30 season	1938–39 season	Unknown	
1928–29 season		Ben Gronow	
1902–03 season	1927–28 season	Unknown	

== Coaches ==
Year	Coach	Games	Won	Lost	Drawn	Win %	Honours
1921–44	Billy Williams	692	217	443	32	31.367%	Yorkshire Cup Winners (1940); Championship Final Runners-up (1928); Yorkshire Cup Runners-Up (1929)
1944–45	Aubrey Casewell						–
1945–48	Bill Sherwood	81	30	49	2	37.047%	–
1947–48	Stanley Smith	40	6	34	0	15%	–
1948–51	Bill Sherwood	123	35	82	6	28.46%	–
1951–56	Eric Batten	210	102	100	8	48.57%	Challenge Cup Runners-Up (1952)
1956–57	Bill Hudson	41	20	21	0	48.78%	–
1957–63	Harold Moxon	264	164	91	9	62.12%	Yorkshire Cup Winners (1959)
1963–66	John Malpass	123	66	55	2	53.66%	Yorkshire Cup Runners-Up (1963)
1966–70	Laurie Gant	171	100	74	7	58.48%	Challenge Cup Winners (1967), Yorkshire Cup Runners-Up (1966, 1969, 1970)
1971–74	Peter Fox	152	89	60	3	58.55%	Challenge Cup Winners (1973); Challenge Cup Runners-Up (1974); Championship Runners-Up (1973)
1974	Tommy Smales	7	3	4	0	42.86%	–
1974–76	Keith Goulding	51	32	17	2	62.75%	–
1976	Thomas Smales	16	11	4	1	68.75%	Championship Runners-Up (1976)
1976–77	Keith Cotton	57	37	18	2	64.91%	Championship Winners (1977); Yorkshire Cup Runners-Up (1976, 1977)
1977–78	Keith Goulding	21	13	6	2	61.90%	–
1978	Terry Clawson	13	4	9	0	30.77%	–
1978–79	Thomas Smales	22	6	15	1	27.27%	–
1979–81	Paul Daley	54	35	17	2	64.81%	Division 2 Winners (1980)
1981–82	Vince Farrar	65	23	40	2	35.38%	–
1983–85	Allan Agar	104	45	53	6	43.27%	Challenge Cup Winners (1983)
1985–86	George Pieniazek	37	11	22	4	29.73%	–
1986–87	Paul Daley	23	7	16	0	30.43%	–
1987–91	Peter Fox	152	80	66	6	52.63%	Division 2 Premiership Runners-Up (1988); Yorkshire Cup Runners-Up (1989)
1991–92	Allan Agar	27	12	14	1	44.44%	–
1992–94	Steve Martin	76	44	29	3	57.89%	Division 2 Winners (1993)
1994–97	David Ward	80	38	39	3	47.50%	–
1997–98	Steve Simms	57	32	24	1	56.14%	First Division Grand Final Runners-Up (1998)
1998–99	Kevin Hobbs	18	9	9	0	50%	–
1999–01	Peter Roe	80	53	23	4	66.25%	–
2001–02	Ian Fairhurst	20	11	8	1	55.00%	–
2002–03	Andy Kelly	48	27	21	0	56.25%	–
2003–05	Gary Price	54	24	26	4	44.44%	–
2005–08	David Hobbs	93	51	38	4	54.84%	National League 2 Grand Final Winners (2007)
2008	Danny Evans	8	3	4	1	37.50%	–
2008–13	Daryl Powell	137	104	30	3	75.91%	Championship Winners (2011), Championship League Leaders (2010, 2011, 2012); European Club Challenge Winners (2012), Championship Grand Final Runners-Up (2010, 2012); Northern Rail Cup Runners-Up (2012)
2013	Ryan Sheridan	8	6	2	0	75%	–
2013	Danny Evans	8	6	2	0	75%	Championship League Leaders (2013)
2014	John Bastian	11	7	4	0	63.64%	–
2014	Danny Evans	1	1	0	0	100%	–
2014–15	Andy Hay	41	27	13	1	65.85%	Championship Grand Final Runners-Up (2014)
2015–17	Jon Sharp	70	42	27	1	60%	Championship Shield Winners (2015)
2017–18	John Duffy	38	23	12	1	60.53%	Championship Shield Winners (2018)
2019	Ryan Carr	34	21	13	0	61.76%	Championship Grand Final Runners-Up
2020–21	James Webster	36	33	3	0	91.67%	Championship Grand Final Runners-Up 1895 Cup Winners (2021)
2021–22	Brian McDermott	33	26	6	1	78.79%	1895 Cup Runners-Up (2022)
2023	Sean Long	22	19	3	0	86.36%	–
2023–25	James Ford	49	33	16	0	67.35%	League Leaders Shield Winners (2023)
2025, 2027-	Paul Cooke	22	13	9	0	57	1895 Cup Runners-Up (2025)

== Seasons ==
=== Super League era ===
Season	League									Play-offs	Challenge Cup	Other competitions		Name	Tries	Name	Points
Season	Division	P	W	D	L	F	A	Pts	Pos	Play-offs	Challenge Cup	Other competitions		Top try scorer		Top point scorer	
1996	Division One	20	12	2	6	557	371	26	4th		R4						
1997	Division One	20	8	1	11	408	395	17	7th		QF						
1998	Division One	30	17	1	12	779	613	35	4th	Lost in Final	R4						
1999	Northern Ford Premiership	28	19	1	8	714	466	39	5th	Lost in Week 2	R4						
2000	Northern Ford Premiership	28	20	1	7	795	523	41	5th	Lost in Week 2	R4						
2001	Northern Ford Premiership	28	18	0	10	825	401	36	5th	Lost in Week 2	R4						
2002	Northern Ford Premiership	27	18	1	8	836	604	37	5th	Lost in Week 3	R4						
2003	National League One	18	7	0	11	387	478	14	7th		R5						
2004	National League One	18	9	1	8	500	491	19	5th	Lost in Preliminary Final	R4						
2005	National League One	18	3	2	13	454	648	8	9th		QF						
2006	National League Two	22	14	1	7	596	504	29	4th	Lost in Elimination Final	R5						
2007	National League Two	22	18	0	4	819	366	56	2nd		R4						
2008	National League One	18	6	1	11	452	515	26	8th		R4						
2009	Championship	20	12	0	8	619	524	37	6th	Lost in Preliminary Final	R5						
2010	Championship	20	18	0	2	735	334	56	1st	Lost in Final	R4						
2011	Championship	20	18	1	1	840	348	56	1st	Won in Final (Note: Denied promotion due to licensing)	R5						
2012	Championship	18	15	1	2	684	354	47	1st	Lost in Final	R5	Championship Cup	RU				
2013	Championship	26	22	0	4	940	362	70	1st	Lost in Semi-final	R4						
2014	Championship	26	18	1	7	871	532	61	2nd		R5						
2015	Championship	23	13	0	10	633	565	26	5th	Won in Shield Final	R6						
2015	Championship Shield	30	19	0	11	809	701	38	1st	Won in Shield Final	R6						
2016	Championship	23	15	0	8	595	384	30	4th		R5						
2016	The Qualifiers	7	0	0	7	96	312	0	8th		R5						
2017	Championship	23	15	1	7	687	421	31	3rd		QF						
2017	The Qualifiers	7	1	1	5	100	272	3	7th		QF						
2018	Championship	23	16	0	7	819	420	32	5th	Won in Shield Final	R6						
2018	Championship Shield	30	23	0	7	1040	524	46	1st	Won in Shield Final	R6						
2019	Championship	27	17	0	10	837	471	34	5th	Lost in Final	R5	1895 Cup	R2				
2020	Championship (Note: The 2020 Championship was abandoned due to the COVID-19 pandemic in the United Kingdom. Statistics shown are those at time of abandonment and are not official.)	4	4	0	0	137	47	8	3rd		R6						
2021	Championship	21	20	0	1	943	292	38	2nd	Lost in Final	R6 (Note: Officially round 1 due to the competitions temporary restructure in 2021.)	1895 Cup	W				
2022	Championship	27	23	1	3	1060	46	47	2nd	Lost in Semi-final	R6	1895 Cup	RU				
2023	Championship	27	25	0	2	1079	295	50	1st	Lost in Semi-final	R3						
2024	Championship	26	14	0	12	622	500	28	6th	Lost in Elimination play-off	R6	1895 Cup	GS				
2025	Championship	24	14	0	10	640	461	28	6th	Lost in Elimination play-off	R4	1895 Cup	RU				

== Honours ==
=== League ===
- First Division / Super League

Winners (1): 1976–77

- Second Division / Championship

Winners (3): 1979–80, 1992–93, 2011

RFL Championship Leaders' Shield

Winners (5): (Note: Featherstone were league leaders in 1979–80 and 1992–93, however trophies were not awarded for such as league leaders were declared champions in this era due to the absence of a grand final.) 2010, 2011, 2012, 2013, 2023

=== Cups ===
- Challenge Cup

Winners (3): 1966–67, 1972–73, 1982–83

- RFL Yorkshire Cup

Winners (2):1939–40, 1959–60

- RFL 1895 Cup

Winners: 2021
Runners up: 2022 & 2025

=== Other ===
- Championship Shield

Winners (2): 2015, 2018

== See also ==
- Featherstone Rovers Women
