= 1970 Great Britain Lions tour =

Series of rugby league matches

- Date: 22 May 1970 – 27 July 1970
- Manager: Jack Harding
- Coach(es): Johnny Whiteley
- Tour captain(s): Frank Myler
- Top point scorer(s): Terry Price (117)
- Top try scorer(s): Syd Hynes (19)
Summary
P	W	D	L
Total
24	22	1	1
Test match
6	5	0	1
Opponent
P	W	D	L
Australia
3	2	0	1
New Zealand
3	3	0	0

Tour chronology
- Previous tour: 1966
- Next tour: 1974

The 1970 Great Britain Lions tour was the Great Britain national rugby league team's 14th tour of Australasia and took place from May to August 1970. A total of 24 matches were played against local club and representative sides during the tour, including a three match Test match series against Australia and New Zealand respectively.

The tour was one of the most successful in Lions history, with the team winning all but two of the matches. It is also remembered for being the last time that Great Britain won an Ashes series against Australia.

== Touring squad ==
On 4 March 1970, an initial 21 players were selected for the tour, with the remaining players to be named later in the month. On 25 March, seven additional players were chosen to complete the 26-man squad, with Frank Myler named as captain (two of the originally selected players withdrew from the squad – John Mantle withdrew for "domestic reasons", while Jim Mills intended to emigrate to Australia to play for North Sydney).

After the squad was selected, John Stephens withdrew from the tour due to injury, and was replaced by Dennis Hartley. The tour manager was Jack Harding, with Johnny Whiteley as assistant manager and coach.

Name	Position	Nationality	Club
Derek Edwards	Utility back	England	Castleford
Terry Price	Fullback	Wales	Bradford Northern
Ray Dutton	Fullback	England	Widnes
Alan Smith	Wing	England	Leeds
John Atkinson	Wing	England	Leeds
Clive Sullivan	Wing	Wales	Hull
Chris Hesketh	Centre	England	Salford
Syd Hynes	Centre	England	Leeds
Frank Myler	Centre	England	St Helens
Mick Shoebottom	Stand-off	England	Leeds
Roger Millward	Stand-off	England	Hull Kingston Rovers
Alan Hardisty	Stand-off	England	Castleford
Barry Seabourne	Scrum-half	England	Leeds
Keith Hepworth	Scrum-half	England	Castleford
Cliff Watson	Prop forward	England	St Helens
John Ward	Prop forward	England	Salford
David Chisnall	Prop forward	England	Leigh
Dennis Hartley	Prop forward	England	Castleford
Peter Flanagan	Hooker	England	Hull Kingston Rovers
Tony Fisher	Hooker	Wales	Bradford Northern
Phil Lowe	Second-row	England	Hull Kingston Rovers
Bob Irving	Second-row	England	Oldham
Dave Robinson	Second-row	England	Wigan
Jim Thompson	Second-row	England	Featherstone Rovers
Malcolm Reilly	Loose forward	England	Castleford
Doug Laughton	Loose forward	England	Wigan

== Results ==
=== Australia ===
22 May 1970

Northern Territory	12 – 35	Great Britain

Richardson Park, Darwin
Attendance: 3,000
Referee: Ray Pittey

24 May 1970

North Queensland	20 – 23	Great Britain

Townsville Sports Reserve, Townsville
Attendance: 7,890
Referee: Sid Volling

26 May 1970

Central Queensland	2 – 30	Great Britain

Rockhampton Showgrounds, Rockhampton
Attendance: 7,290
Referee: Nick Euclid

28 May 1970

Wide Bay	7 – 45	Great Britain

Wondai Sports Ground, Gympie
Attendance: 3,344
Referee: L. Cronin

30 May 1970

Queensland Firsts	7 – 32	Great Britain

Lang Park, Brisbane
Attendance: 17,071
Referee: Henry Albert

==== First Test ====
6 June 1970

Australia	37 – 15	Great Britain
Tries: King (2), Morgan (2), McDonald; Goals: Langlands (9); Drop goals: Hawthorne (2)		Tries: Flanagan, Laughton, Watson; Goals: Price (3)

Lang Park, Brisbane
Attendance: 42,807
Referee: Don Lancashire (Australia)

7 June 1970

Toowoomba	13 – 37	Great Britain

Athletic Oval, Toowoomba
Attendance: 6,549
Referee: Des Creedy

10 June 1970

Brisbane Firsts	7 – 28	Great Britain

Brisbane Exhibition Grounds, Brisbane
Attendance: 10,117
Referee: Henry Albert

13 June 1970

NSW Firsts	17 – 17	Great Britain

Sydney Cricket Ground, Sydney
Attendance: 31,509
Referee: Keith Page

14 June 1970

Monaro	11 – 34	Great Britain

Seiffert Oval, Queanbeyan
Attendance: 9,500
Referee: Graham Barby

==== Second Test ====
20 June 1970

Australia	7 – 28	Great Britain
Tries: King; Goals: McDonald; Drop goals: Hawthorne		Tries: Millward (2), Atkinson, Fisher; Goals: Millward (6); Drop goals: Hynes, Millward

Sydney Cricket Ground, Sydney
Attendance: 60,962
Referee: Don Lancashire (Australia)

21 June 1970

Western Division	11 – 40	Great Britain

Bathurst Showground, Bathurst
Attendance: 4,400
Referee: Tom Gustard

23 June 1970

Sydney Colts	7 – 26	Great Britain

Endeavour Field, Sydney
Attendance: 14,046
Referee: Keith Holman

27 June 1970

Newcastle	16 – 49	Great Britain

Newcastle Number 1 Sports Ground, Newcastle
Attendance: 22,655
Referee: Neil McAlister

28 June 1970

Riverina	11 – 12	Great Britain

Robertson Oval, Wagga Wagga
Attendance: 11,000
Referee: Bruce Chapman

==== Third Test ====
4 July 1970

Australia	17 – 21	Great Britain
Tries: McCarthy; Goals: McKean (7)		Tries: Atkinson (2), Hartley, Hynes, Millward; Goals: Millward (3)

Sydney Cricket Ground, Sydney
Attendance: 61,258
Referee: Don Lancashire (Australia)

5 July 1970

Southern Division	11 – 24	Great Britain

Wollongong Showground, Wollongong
Attendance: 7,796
Referee: Neil McAlister

=== New Zealand ===
8 July 1970

Northern XIII	17 – 42	Great Britain

Tokoroa Memorial Sports Ground Tokoroa
Attendance: 3,546
Referee: Ron Pont

==== First Test ====
11 July 1970

New Zealand	15 – 19	Great Britain
Tries: Orchard; Goals: Ladner (6)		Tries: Laughton (2), Atkinson, Hynes, Millward; Goals: Hynes (2)

Carlaw Park, Auckland
Attendance: 15,948
Referee: John Percival (New Zealand)

14 July 1970

Wellington XIII	8 – 60	Great Britain

Basin Reserve, Wellington
Attendance: 859
Referee: Earle Pilcher

==== Second Test ====
19 July 1970

New Zealand	9 – 23	Great Britain
Tries: Christian; Goals: Ladner (3)		Tries: Millward (2), Laughton, Myler, Reilly; Goals: Dutton (4)

Addington Showgrounds, Christchurch
Attendance: 8,600
Referee: John Percival (New Zealand)

21 July 1970

West Coast	2 – 57	Great Britain

Wingham Park, Greymouth
Attendance: 676
Referee: Ted Gutbertlet

==== Third Test ====
25 July 1970

New Zealand	16 – 33	Great Britain
Tries: Bailey, Orchard; Goals: Ladner (5)		Tries: Lowe (2), Hepworth, Hesketh, Hynes, Smith, Watson; Goals: Dutton (5), Millward

Carlaw Park, Auckland
Attendance: 13,137
Referee: John Percival (New Zealand)

27 July 1970

Auckland	8 – 23	Great Britain

Carlaw Park, Auckland
Attendance: 6,074
Referee: A. Taylor

== Aftermath ==
The tour was one of the most successful in Lions history, with the team winning 22 out of their 24 matches – their only defeat was the first Test against Australia, with the draw against New South Wales being the only other game they failed to win. The tour made a profit of approximately £60,000.
