= Alan Hardisty =

English rugby league footballer and coach (born 1941)

Personal information
- Full name: Alan Hardisty
- Born: 12 July 1941 (age 84) Pontefract, England

Playing information
- Position: Stand-off
Club
| Years | Team | Pld | T | G | FG | P |
|---|---|---|---|---|---|---|
| 1958–71 | Castleford | 401 | 206 | 78 | 42 | 858 |
| 1971–74 | Leeds |
| | Total | 401 | 206 | 78 | 42 | 858 |
Representative
| Years | Team | Pld | T | G | FG | P |
| 1961–71 | Yorkshire | 5 | 3 | 0 | 1 | 11 |
| 1968–71 | Great Britain | 12 | 9 | 0 | 0 | 27 |

Coaching information
Club
| Years | Team | Gms | W | D | L | W% |
| 1970–71 | Castleford | 24 | 13 | 0 | 11 | 54 |
| 1974–75 | Dewsbury RLFC |
| 1982–83 | York |
| 1989 | Halifax |
| | Total | 24 | 13 | 0 | 11 | 54 |

Alan Hardisty (born 12 July 1941), also known by the nickname of "Chuck", is an English former professional rugby league footballer who played in the 1950s, 1960s and 1970s, and coached in the 1970s and 1980s. He played at representative level for Great Britain and Yorkshire, and at club level for Castleford (captain) and Leeds (captain) as a stand-off, and coached at club level for Castleford and York.

== Background ==
Hardisty's birth was registered in Pontefract district, West Riding of Yorkshire, England. He attended Ashton Road Secondary School (now the site of Smawthorne Henry Moore Primary School), Castleford, where he played alongside Clive Dickinson and Johnny Ward in the school rugby league team.

== Playing career ==
=== Castleford ===
Hardisty made his debut for Castleford in September 1958 against Keighley. His first honours with the club came in the 1964–65 season, helping Castleford win the Yorkshire League.

Hardisty played stand-off in Castleford's 4–0 victory over St. Helens in the 1965 BBC2 Floodlit Trophy Final during the 1965–66 season at Knowsley Road, St. Helens on Tuesday 14 December 1965, played stand-off in the 7–2 victory over Swinton in the 1966 BBC2 Floodlit Trophy Final during the 1966–67 season at Wheldon Road, Castleford on Tuesday 20 December 1966, and played stand-off in the 8–5 victory over Leigh in the 1967 BBC2 Floodlit Trophy Final during the 1967–68 season at Headingley, Leeds on Saturday 16 January 1968.

Hardisty played stand-off, scored a try, and was captain in Castleford's 11–6 victory over Salford in the 1968–69 Challenge Cup Final during the 1968–69 season at Wembley Stadium, London on Saturday 17 May 1969, in front of a crowd of 97,939, played stand-off (replaced by substitute Danny Hargrave following a shoulder injury), and was captain in the 7–2 victory over Wigan in the 1969–70 Challenge Cup Final during the 1969–70 season at Wembley Stadium, London on Saturday 9 May 1970, in front of a crowd of 95,255,

Hardisty played stand-off, and scored 2-goals in Castleford's 11–22 defeat by Leeds in the 1968–69 Yorkshire Cup Final during the 1968–69 season at Belle Vue, Wakefield on Saturday 19 October 1968.

Hardisty's Testimonial match at Castleford took place in 1968.

With 401 appearances, Hardisty is fourth in Castleford's all-time appearance list behind John Joyner (613 appearances), Artie Atkinson and Dean Sampson (who both have 431 appearances). He is also Castleford's highest all-time try scorer with a club total of 206.

=== Leeds ===
Hardisty played stand-off, and was captain in Leeds' 9–5 victory over St. Helens in the Championship Final during the 1971–72 season at Station Road, Swinton on Saturday 20 May 1972, and was sent off in Leeds' 13–22 defeat by Dewsbury in the Championship Final during the 1972–73 season at Odsal Stadium, Bradford on Saturday 19 May 1973.

He played stand-off in Leeds' 13–16 defeat by St. Helens in the 1971–72 Challenge Cup Final during the 1971–72 season at Wembley Stadium, London on Saturday 13 May 1972, in front of a crowd of 89,495.

Hardisty played stand-off in Leeds' 12–7 victory over Salford in the 1972–73 Player's No.6 Trophy Final during the 1972–73 season at Fartown Ground, Huddersfield on Saturday 24 March 1973.

He played stand-off, and scored a try in Leeds' 36–9 victory over Dewsbury in the 1972–73 Yorkshire Cup Final during the 1972–73 season at Odsal Stadium, Bradford on Saturday 7 October 1972, and played stand-off in the 7–2 victory over Hull Kingston Rovers in the 1973–74 Yorkshire Cup Final during the 1973–74 season at Headingley, Leeds on Saturday 20 October 1973.

=== Later career ===
Hardisty briefly moved to Rockhampton in Australia after being allowed to leave Leeds. He played for Central Queensland against the touring Great Britain Lions team in 1974.

=== Representative honours ===
Hardisty won caps for Great Britain while at Castleford in 1964 against France (3 matches), in 1965 against France and New Zealand, in 1966 against Australia (3 matches), and New Zealand, in 1967 against France (2 matches), and in 1970 against Australia. He was selected to playing in the Great Britain Lions touring team in 1966 and 1970.

Hardisty won caps playing stand-off for Yorkshire while at Castleford in the 8–23 defeat by Cumberland at Belle Vue, Wakefield on 11 September 1961, the 14–6 victory over Cumberland at the Recreation Ground, Whitehaven on 9 September 1964, scoring 3-tries in the 33–10 victory over Lancashire at the Boulevard, Hull on 23 September 64, the 3–19 defeat by Cumberland at Craven Park (old), Hull on 8 September 1965, and scoring 1-drop goal in the 34–8 victory over Lancashire at Wheldon Road, Castleford on 24 February 1971.

== Coaching career ==
Hardisty was appointed as player-coach at Castleford in December 1970, following the departure of Tommy Smales. At the end of the 1970–71 season, he was informed that he would not be retained as coach, and was subsequently released.

In May 1982, Hardisty began coaching at York Wasps, replacing Bill Kirkbride. He resigned in January 1983.

Hardisty also briefly coached Halifax for the remainder of the 1988–89 season following the resignation of Ross Strudwick.

== Honours ==
Hardisty is a Tigers Hall of Fame inductee.

Arriva Yorkshire honoured 13 rugby league footballers on Thursday 20 August 2009, at a ceremony at the Jungle, the home of the Castleford. A fleet of new buses were named after the "Arriva Yorkshire Rugby League Dream Team". Members of the public nominated the best ever rugby league footballers to have played in West Yorkshire, supported by local rugby league journalists; James Deighton from BBC Leeds, and Tim Butcher, editor of Rugby League World. The "Arriva Yorkshire Rugby League Dream Team" is; Trevor Foster MBE, Neil Fox MBE, Albert Goldthorpe, Alan Hardisty, Stan Kielty, Lewis Jones, Roger Millward MBE, Malcolm Reilly, Garry Schofield, Keith Senior, David Topliss, Dave Valentine and Adrian Vowles.
