= 1968–69 Challenge Cup =

Rugby league competition

- Duration: 5 Rounds
- Number of teams: 32
- Highest attendance: 97,939
- Broadcast partners: BBC
- Winners: Castleford
- Runners-up: Salford
- Lance Todd Trophy: Mal Reilly

The 1968–69 Challenge Cup was the 68th staging of rugby league's oldest knockout competition, the Challenge Cup.

The final was contested by Castleford and Salford at Wembley in front of a crowd of 97,939. Castleford won the match 11–6.

The winner of the Lance Todd Trophy was Castleford loose forward Mal Reilly.

== First round ==
Date	Team one	Team two	Score
24 Jan	Wigan	Leigh Miners W.	61-0
25 Jan	Dewsbury	Bradford Northern	7-21
25 Jan	Halifax	Leeds	12-17
25 Jan	Hull	St Helens	3-13
25 Jan	Hunslet	Castleford	7-19
25 Jan	Keighley	Whitehaven	23-22
25 Jan	Leigh	Rochdale Hornets	4-13
25 Jan	Oldham	Hull Kingston Rovers	12-10
25 Jan	Salford	Batley	17-2
25 Jan	Wakefield Trinity	Ackworth	50-7
25 Jan	Workington Town	Swinton	5-2
26 Jan	Doncaster	Featherstone Rovers	3-4
26 Jan	Huddersfield	Barrow	13-5
26 Jan	Widnes	York	23-8
28 Jan	Huyton	Warrington	2-5
01 Feb	Blackpool	Bramley	10-17

== Second round ==
Date	Team one	Team two	Score
15 Feb	Castleford	Wigan	12-8
22 Feb	Salford	Workington Town	12-5
22 Feb	Warrington	Huddersfield	29-8
22 Feb	Rochdale Hornets	Bramley	7-7
24 Feb	Keighley	Leeds	2-17
25 Feb	Oldham	St Helens	6-15
26 Feb	Bradford Northern	Wakefield Trinity	7-7
26 Feb	Bramley	Rochdale Hornets	4-7
26 Feb	Featherstone Rovers	Widnes	7-9
27 Feb	Wakefield Trinity	Bradford Northern	10-0

== Quarter-finals ==
Date	Team one	Team two	Score
01 Mar	Warrington	St Helens	4-2
01 Mar	Wakefield Trinity	Rochdale Hornets	10-10
01 Mar	Castleford	Leeds	9-5
02 Mar	Salford	Widnes	20-7
05 Mar	Rochdale Hornets	Wakefield Trinity	2-15

== Semi-finals ==
Date	Team one	Team two	Score
22 Mar	Castleford	Wakefield Trinity	16-10
29 Mar	Warrington	Salford	8-15

== Final ==
17 May 1969

Castleford	11 – 6	Salford
Try: Howe, Hardisty, Hepworth; Goal: Redfearn	Report	Goal: Hill (3)

Wembley, London
Attendance: 97,939
Referee: D. S. Brown (Preston)
Player of the Match: Mal Reilly

FB	1	Derek Edwards
RW	2	Trevor Briggs
RC	3	Keith Howe
LC	4	Tony Thomas
LW	5	Alan Lowndes
SO	6	Alan Hardisty (c)
SH	7	Keith Hepworth
PR	8	Dennis Hartley
HK	9	Clive Dickinson
PR	10	John Ward
SR	11	Mick Redfearn
SR	12	Brian Lockwood
LF	13	Mal Reilly
Substitutes (not used):
IC	14	Dennis Harris
IC	15	Frank Fox
Coach:
Derek Turner

FB	1	Ken Gwilliam
RW	2	Bill Burgess
RC	3	Stuart Whitehead
LC	4	Chris Hesketh
LW	5	Paul Jackson
SO	6	David Watkins (c)
SH	7	Jack Brennan
PR	8	Terry Ogden
HK	9	Martin Dickens
PR	10	Charlie Bott
SR	11	Mike Coulman
SR	12	Colin Dixon
LF	13	Ron Hill
Substitutes (not used):
IC	14	Bob Prosser
IC	15	Peter Smethurst
Coach:
Griff Jenkins
