= Danny Hargrave =

English rugby league footballer (died 2019)

Personal information
- Born: unknown
- Died: 27 January 2019

Playing information
- Position: Stand-off, Scrum-half
Club
Years	Team	Pld	T	G	FG	P
1967–73	Castleford	124	22	0	2	70

Danny Hargrave (birth unknown – 27 January 2019) was a professional rugby league footballer who played in the 1960s and 1970s. He played at club level for Kippax ARLFC (in Kippax, Leeds) and Castleford, as a stand-off or scrum-half.

== Background ==
Danny Hargrave's funeral service took place at St. Mary's Church, Church Lane, Kippax, Leeds, on Tuesday 5 March 2019, followed by a committal in the church's graveyard, and then a reception at Kippax Central working men's club.

== Playing career ==
=== Challenge Cup Final appearances ===
Danny Hargrave appeared as a substitute (replacing stand-off Alan Hardisty) in Castleford's 7-2 victory over Wigan in the 1970 Challenge Cup Final during the 1969–70 season at Wembley Stadium, London on Saturday 9 May 1970, in front of a crowd of 95,255.

=== County Cup Final appearances ===
Danny Hargrave played scrum-half in Castleford's 11-22 defeat by Leeds in the 1968 Yorkshire Cup Final during the 1968–69 season at Belle Vue, Wakefield on Saturday 19 October 1968, and played stand-off in the 7-11 defeat by Hull Kingston Rovers in the 1971 Yorkshire Cup Final during the 1971–72 season at Belle Vue, Wakefield on Saturday 21 August 1971.

=== Genealogical information ===
Danny Hargrave's marriage to Lynn (née Clegg) was registered during third 1/4 1972 in Pontefract district. They had children; the future rugby league footballer who played in the 1990s for Castleford; Spencer Hargrave (birth registered third 1/4 1978 (age 47–48) in Pontefract district).
