= 1968–69 BBC2 Floodlit Trophy =

- Structure: Floodlit knockout championship
- Teams: 18
- Winners: Wigan
- Runners-up: St. Helens

The 1968–69 BBC2 Floodlit Trophy was the fourth occasion on which the BBC2 Floodlit Trophy competition had been held.
This year was a new name on the trophy after Castleford's three year winning streak came to an end.
Wigan won the trophy by beating St. Helens by the score of 7-4
The match was played at Central Park, Wigan, (historically in the county of Lancashire). The attendance was 13,479 and receipts were £3,291
This was to be Wigan's only success in the competition.

== Background ==
This season saw no changes in the entrants, no new members and no withdrawals, the number remaining at eighteen.
However the format was changed slightly with the games in the preliminary round being on a two-legged home and away basis.
This preliminary round now involved four clubs, reducing the numbers to sixteen, followed by a straightforward knock out competition.

== Competition and results ==
=== Preliminary round – first leg ===
Involved 2 matches and 4 clubs

Game No	Fixture date	Home team	Score	Away team	Venue	agg	Att	Rec	Notes	Ref
P1	Mon 9 Sep 1968	Wakefield Trinity	11-15	Castleford	Belle Vue					
P1	Tue 10 Sep 1968	St. Helens	21-5	Barrow	Knowsley Road					

=== Preliminary round – second leg ===
Involved 2 matches with the same 4 Clubs with reverse fixtures

Game No	Fixture date	Home team	Score	Away team	Venue	agg	Att	Rec	Notes	Ref
P2	Mon 23 Sep 1968	Castleford	18-0	Wakefield Trinity	Wheldon Road	33-11			1	
P2	Mon 23 Sep 1968	Barrow	18-11	St. Helens	Craven Park	23-32	2672			

=== Round 1 – first round ===
Involved 8 matches and 16 clubs

Game No	Fixture date	Home team	Score	Away team	Venue	Att	Rec	Notes	Ref
1	Tue 1 Oct 1968	Leeds	24-19	Salford	Headingley				
2	Tue 8 Oct 1968	Wigan	10-7	Castleford	Central Park			2	
3	Mon 14 Oct 1968	Hull F.C.	22-13	Widnes	Boulevard			3	
4	Mon 14 Oct 1968	St. Helens	12-10	Swinton	Knowsley Road	4900			
5	Tue 15 Oct 1968	Leigh	27-19	Hull Kingston Rovers	Hilton Park				
6	Tue 15 Oct 1968	Rochdale Hornets	16-14	Oldham	Athletic Grounds			4	
7	Tue 22 Oct 1968	Keighley	8-11	Huddersfield	Lawkholme Lane	2795		5	
8	Tue 29 Oct 1968	Warrington	30-12	Halifax	Wilderspool				

=== Round 2 – quarter finals ===
Involved 4 matches with 8 clubs

Game No	Fixture date	Home team	Score	Away team	Venue	Att	Rec	Notes	Ref
1	Tue 5 Nov 1968	Rochdale Hornets	7-23	Wigan	Athletic Grounds			2	
2	Tue 12 Nov 1968	Leigh	25-11	Leeds	Hilton Park				
3	Tue 19 Nov 1968	Warrington	18-5	Huddersfield	Wilderspool				
4	Tue 26 Nov 1968	St. Helens	14-10	Hull F.C.	Knowsley Road				

=== Round 3 – semi-finals ===
Involved 2 matches and 4 clubs

Game No	Fixture date	Home team	Score	Away team	Venue	Att	Rec	Notes	Ref
1	Tue 3 Dec 1968	Wigan	9-7	Leigh	Central Park			2	
2	Tue 10 Dec 1968	St. Helens	29-6	Warrington	Knowsley Road				

=== Final ===
Game No	Fixture date	Home team	Score	Away team	Venue	Att	Rec	Notes	Ref
	Tuesday 17 December 1968	Wigan	7-4	St. Helens	Central Park	13,479	3,291	2 6	

==== Teams and scorers ====
Wigan	№	St. Helens
	teams	
Colin Tyrer	1	Cen Williams
Bill Francis	2	Frank Wilson
Eric Ashton	3	Billy Benyon
Bill Ashurst	4	Frank Myler
Peter Rowe	5	John Wills
Cliff Hill	6	Alan Whittle
Johnny Jackson	7	Tommy Bishop
John Stephens	8	John Warlow
Colin Clarke	9	Bill Sayer
Keith Mills	10	Cliff Watson
Terry Fogerty	11	John Mantle
Kevin O'Loughlin	12	Brian Hogan
Doug Laughton	13	Kel Coslett
Geoff Lyon	14	Eric Prescott
A. N. Other	15	Eric Chisnall
Eric Ashton	Coach	Cliff Evans
7	score	4
2	HT	4
	Scorers	
	Tries	
Cliff Hill (1)	T	
	Goals	
Colin Tyrer (2)	G	Kel Coslett (2)
Referee		(Sergeant Major) Eric Clay (Leeds)

Scoring - Try = three (3) points - Goal = two (2) points - Drop goal = two (2) points

=== The road to success ===
This tree excludes any preliminary round fixtures

First round
Rochdale Hornets	16
Oldham	14
Wigan	10
Castleford	7
Leigh	27
Hull Kingston Rovers	19
Leeds	24
Salford	19
St. Helens	12
Leigh	10
Hull F.C.	22
Widnes	13
Warrington	30
Halifax	12
Keighley	8
Huddersfield	11

Second round
Rochdale Hornets	7
Wigan	23
Leigh	25
Leeds	11
St. Helens	14
Hull F.C.	10
Warrington	18
Huddersfield	5

Semi-finals
Wigan	9
Leigh	7
St. Helens	29
Warrington	6

Final
Wigan	7
St. Helens	4

== Notes and comments ==
1 * Rothmans Rugby League Yearbook 1990-91 and 1991-1992 and "100 Years of Rugby. The History of Wakefield Trinity 1873-1973" give the score as 18–0 but as obvious error in the wonderfully detailed independent WEB "Wakefield 'till I die" gives the score as 13-0
2 * This match was televised
3 * Hull F.C. (who joined the competition in season 1967-68) play their first game at home in the competition
4 * Rochdale Hornets, who joined the competition in season 1966-67, win their first game in the competition
5 * Keighley (who joined the competition in season 1967-68) play their first game at home in the competition
6 * The attendance was a record at that time
7 * Central Park was the home ground of Wigan with a final capacity of 18,000, although the record attendance was 47,747 for Wigan v St Helens 27 March 1959

== See also ==
- 1968–69 Northern Rugby Football League season
- 1968 Lancashire Cup
- 1968 Yorkshire Cup
- BBC2 Floodlit Trophy
- Rugby league county cups
