= 1967–68 BBC2 Floodlit Trophy =

- Structure: Floodlit knockout championship
- Teams: 18
- Winners: Castleford
- Runners-up: Leigh

The 1967–68 BBC2 Floodlit Trophy was the third occasion on which the BBC2 Floodlit Trophy competition had been held.

Castleford won the trophy by beating Leigh by the score of 8-5
The match was played at Headingley, Leeds, now in West Yorkshire. The attendance was 9,716 and receipts were £2,099
This was the third of Castleford's three victories in successive seasons in the first three Floodlit competitions

== Background ==
This season the original eight invitees plus the three "newcomers" from last season (Barrow, Rochdale Hornets and Salford) are joined by a further seven clubs.
These are Halifax, Huddersfield, Hull FC, Hull Kingston Rovers, Keighley, Wakefield Trinity and Wigan and bring the total of entrants up to eighteen.
This involved the introduction of a preliminary knock-out round on a knock-out basis, to reduce the numbers to sixteen, followed by a straightforward knock out competition.

== Competition and results ==
=== Preliminary round ===
Involved 2 matches and 4 clubs

| Game No | Fixture date | Home team | Score | Away team | Venue | Att | Rec | Notes | Ref |
|---|---|---|---|---|---|---|---|---|---|
| P | Mon 18 Sep 1967 | Hull Kingston Rovers | 12-8 | Hull F.C. | Craven Park (1) | | | 1 2 | |
| P | Tue 19 Sep 1967 | Halifax | 16-0 | Huddersfield | Thrum Hall | 2,688 | | 3 4 | |

=== Round 1 – first round ===
Involved 8 matches and 16 clubs

| Game No | Fixture date | Home team | Score | Away team | Venue | Att | Rec | Notes | Ref |
|---|---|---|---|---|---|---|---|---|---|
| 1 | Mon 2 Oct 1967 | Wigan | 32-6 | Widnes | Central Park | | | 5 | |
| 2 | Tue 3 Oct 1967 | Salford | 3-5 | Leigh | The Willows | | | | |
| 3 | Mon 9 Oct 1967 | Halifax | 5-5 | Leeds | Thrum Hall | | | | |
| 4 | Tue 10 Oct 1967 | Rochdale Hornets | 2-10 | Swinton | Athletic Grounds | | | | |
| 5 | Tue 17 Oct 1967 | Castleford | 18-7 | Keighley | Wheldon Road | | | 6 | |
| 6 | Mon 23 Oct 1967 | Barrow | 4-8 | Warrington | Craven Park | | | 7 | |
| 7 | Tue 24 Oct 1967 | Wakefield Trinity | 5-5 | Hull Kingston Rovers | Belle Vue | | | 8 | |
| 8 | Tue 7 Nov 1967 | St. Helens | 14-0 | Oldham | Knowsley Road | 6700 | | | |

=== Round 1 – replays ===
Involved 2 matches and 4 clubs

| Game No | Fixture date | Home team | Score | Away team | Venue | Att | Rec | Notes | Ref |
|---|---|---|---|---|---|---|---|---|---|
| R | Mon 23 Oct 1967 | Leeds | 12-7 | Halifax | Headingley | | | 9 | |
| R | Mon 6 Nov 1967 | Hull Kingston Rovers | 13-10 | Wakefield Trinity | Craven Park (1) | | | | |

=== Round 2 – quarter finals ===
Involved 4 matches with 8 clubs

| Game No | Fixture date | Home team | Score | Away team | Venue | Att | Rec | Notes | Ref |
|---|---|---|---|---|---|---|---|---|---|
| 1 | Tue 31 Oct 1967 | Leigh | 10-2 | Swinton | Hilton Park | | | | |
| 2 | Tue 14 Nov 1967 | Hull Kingston Rovers | 12-13 | Warrington | Craven Park (1) | | | | |
| 3 | Tue 21 Nov 1967 | St. Helens | P | Wigan | Knowsley Road | | | 10 | |
| 4 | Tue 28 Nov 1967 | Castleford | 12-9 | Leeds | Wheldon Road | | | | |

=== Round 2 – quarter finals – replays ===
Involved 1 match and 2 clubs

| Game No | Fixture date | Home team | Score | Away team | Venue | Att | Rec | Notes | Ref |
|---|---|---|---|---|---|---|---|---|---|
| R | Wed 22 Nov 1967 | St. Helens | 11-22 | Wigan | Knowsley Road | 15341 | | | |

=== Round 3 – semi-finals ===
Involved 2 matches and 4 clubs

| Game No | Fixture date | Home team | Score | Away team | Venue | Att | Rec | Notes | Ref |
|---|---|---|---|---|---|---|---|---|---|
| 1 | Tue 6 Dec 1967 | Leigh | 10-2 | Wigan | Hilton Park | | | 11 | |
| 2 | Tue 12 Dec 1967 | Warrington | 2-14 | Castleford | Wilderspool | | | | |

=== Final ===
| Game No | Fixture date | Home team | Score | Away team | Venue | Att | Rec | Notes | Ref |
|---|---|---|---|---|---|---|---|---|---|
| F | Saturday 16 January 1968 | Castleford | 8-5 | Leigh | Headingley | 9,716 | 2,099 | 12 13 | |

==== Teams and scorers ====
| Castleford | № | Leigh |
|---|---|---|
| | teams | |
| Derek Edwards | 1 | Tom Grainey |
| Dennis Harris | 2 | Rod Tickle |
| Tony Thomas | 3 | Gordon Lewis |
| Ian Stenton | 4 | Mick Collins |
| Ron Willett | 5 | Joseph Walsh |
| Alan "Chuck" Hardisty (c) | 6 | Terry Entwistle |
| Keith Hepworth | 7 | Alex Murphy |
| Dennis Hartley | 8 | Allan Whitworth |
| John Ward | 9 | Kevin Ashcroft |
| Doug Walton | 10 | Harry Major |
| Wiliam "Bill" Bryant | 11 | Bob Welding |
| Michael Redfearn | 12 | Mick Murphy |
| Mal Reilly | 13 | Laurie Gilfedder |
| Ronald Hill (unused?) | 14 | Ray Fox |
| Clive Dickinson (replaced injured Bill Bryant in the first half) | 15 | |
| George Clinton | Coach | Alex Murphy |
| 8 | score | 5 |
| 6 | HT | 5 |
| | Scorers | |
| | Tries | |
| | T | Rod Tickle (1) |
| | Goals | |
| Ron Willett (4) | G | Laurie Gilfedder (1) |
| Referee | | G. Frederick "Fred" Lindop (Wakefield) |

Scoring - Try = three (3) points - Goal = two (2) points - Drop goal = two (2) points

=== The road to success ===
This tree excludes any preliminary round fixtures

First round
Wakefield Trinity | 5 (10)
Hull Kingston Rovers | 5 (13)
Barrow | 4
Warrington | 8
Castleford | 18
Keighley | 7
Halifax | 5 (7)
Leeds | 5 (12)
Salford | 3
Leigh | 5
Rochdale Hornets | 2
Swinton | 10
St. Helens | 14
Oldham | 0
Wigan | 32
Widnes | 6

Second round
Hull Kingston Rovers | 12
Warrington | 13
Castleford | 12
Leeds | 9
Leigh | 10
Swinton | 2
St. Helens | 11
Wigan | 22

Semi-finals
Warrington | 2
Castleford | 14
Leigh | 10
Wigan | 2

Final
Castleford | 8
Leigh | 5

== Notes and comments ==
1 * Hull F.C. join the competition and play first game in the competition
2 * Hull Kingston Rovers join the competition and play first game in the competition, and first at home in the competition
3 * Halifax join the competition and play first game in the competition, and first at home in the competition
4 * Huddersfield join the competition and play first game in the competition
5 * Wigan join the competition and play first game in the competition, and first at home in the competition
6 * Keighley join the competition and play first game in the competition
7 * Warrington, one of the ten original competitors in 1965-66, win their first game in the competition
8 * Wakefield Trinity join the competition and play first game in the competition, and first at home in the competition
9 * Leeds, one of the ten original competitors in 1965-66, win their first game in the competition
10 * Postponed due to fog
11 * match on TV
12 * The first of only two occasions on which the BBC2 Floodlit Trophy was played on a neutral ground
13 * Headingley, Leeds, is the home ground of Leeds RLFC with a capacity of 21,000. The record attendance was 40,175 for a league match between Leeds and Bradford Northern on 21 May 1947.

== See also ==
- 1967–68 Northern Rugby Football League season
- 1967 Lancashire Cup
- 1967 Yorkshire Cup
- BBC2 Floodlit Trophy
- Rugby league county cups
