= 1969–70 Challenge Cup =

Rugby league competition

- Duration: 5 Rounds
- Number of teams: 32
- Highest attendance: 95,255
- Broadcast partners: BBC
- Winners: Castleford
- Runners-up: Wigan
- Lance Todd Trophy: Bill Kirkbride

The 1970 Challenge Cup was the 69th staging of rugby league's oldest knockout competition, the Challenge Cup.

The final was contested by Castleford and Wigan at Wembley in front of a crowd of 95,255. Castleford won the match 7–2.

The winner of the Lance Todd Trophy was Castleford second-row, Bill Kirkbride.

== First round ==
Date	Team one	Team two	Score
07 Feb	Castleford	Hull FC	15-0
07 Feb	Dewsbury	Wigan	6-11
07 Feb	Doncaster	Glasson	22-4
07 Feb	Featherstone Rovers	Salford	2-7
07 Feb	Keighley	Bramley	0-7
07 Feb	Leeds	Batley	17-5
07 Feb	Oldham	Blackpool	5-0
07 Feb	St Helens	Bradford Northern	16-3
07 Feb	Wakefield Trinity	Hull Kingston Rovers	9-16
07 Feb	Whitehaven	Warrington	4-20
07 Feb	Widnes	Barrow	4-11
07 Feb	Workington Town	Leigh	6-17
08 Feb	Huyton	Hunslet	10-8
10 Feb	Halifax	Swinton	9-16
11 Feb	Huddersfield	Lock Lane	15-10
19 Feb	Rochdale Hornets	York	2-0

== Second round ==
Date	Team one	Team two	Score
21 Feb	Barrow	Castleford	4-12
21 Feb	Doncaster	Rochdale Hornets	5-5
21 Feb	Hull Kingston Rovers	Swinton	7-2
21 Feb	Huyton	Leigh	8-8
21 Feb	Oldham	Wigan	4-17
21 Feb	St Helens	Bramley	17-2
21 Feb	Warrington	Leeds	5-11
22 Feb	Huddersfield	Salford	0-0
23 Feb - replay	Leigh	Huyton	2-0
25 Feb - replay	Rochdale Hornets	Doncaster	3-4
26 Feb - replay	Salford	Huddersfield	11-5

== Quarter-finals ==
Date	Team one	Team two	Score
07 Mar	Castleford	Salford	15-0
07 Mar	Hull Kingston Rovers	Leeds	7-2
07 Mar	Leigh	Wigan	4-6
11 Mar	Doncaster	St Helens	4-4
16 Mar -replay	St Helens	Doncaster	36-0

== Semi-finals ==
Date	Team one	Team two	Score
21 Mar	Wigan	Hull Kingston Rovers	19-8
04 Apr	St Helens	Castleford	3-6

== Final ==
9 May 1970

Castleford	7 – 2	Wigan
Try: Lowndes; Goal: Redfearn (2)	Report	Goal: Tyrer

Wembley, London
Attendance: 95,255
Referee: Fred Lindop (Wakefield)
Player of the Match: Bill Kirkbride

FB	1	Derek Edwards
RW	2	Trevor Briggs
RC	3	Tony Thomas
LC	4	Ian Stenton
LW	5	Alan Lowndes
SO	6	Alan Hardisty (c)	(substituted off) 61'
SH	7	Keith Hepworth
PR	8	Dennis Hartley
HK	9	Clive Dickinson
PR	10	Mick Redfearn
SR	11	Bill Kirkbride
SR	12	Brian Lockwood
LF	13	Mal Reilly
Substitutes:
IC	14	Danny Hargrave	(substituted on) 61'
IC	15	Steve Norton
Coach:
Thomas Smales

FB	1	Colin Tyrer	(substituted off) 18'
RW	2	Keri Jones
RC	3	Bill Francis
LC	4	Peter Rowe
LW	5	Kevin O'Loughlin
SO	6	David Hill
SH	7	Frank Parr
PR	8	Keith Ashcroft
HK	9	Bob Burdell
PR	10	Brian Hogan
SR	11	Bill Ashurst
SR	12	Dave Robinson
LF	13	Doug Laughton (c)
Substitutes:
IC	14	Cliff Hill	(substituted on) 18'
IC	15	Colin Clarke
Coach:
Eric Ashton
