= Peter Rowe (rugby) =

Wales international rugby league footballer

Personal information
- Born: 11 March 1947 (age 78) Cornwall, England

Playing information

Rugby union
Club
| Years | Team | Pld | T | G | FG | P |
|---|---|---|---|---|---|---|
| 1965–66 | Swansea RFC |

Rugby league
- Position: Wing, Centre, Stand-off, Second-row, Loose forward
Club
| Years | Team | Pld | T | G | FG | P |
|---|---|---|---|---|---|---|
| 1966–73 | Wigan | 212 | 55 | 0 | 0 | 165 |
| 1973–76 | Blackpool Borough | 46 | 9 | 10 | 2 | 49 |
| 1977–80 | Huddersfield |
| 1981–83 | Cardiff | 19 | 2 | 0 | 2 | 8 |
| | Total | 277 | 66 | 10 | 4 | 222 |
Representative
| Years | Team | Pld | T | G | FG | P |
| 1969–79 | Wales | 10 | 2 | 0 | 1 | 7 |
| 1974–75 | Other Nationalities | 5 | 1 | 0 | 0 | 3 |

Peter Rowe (born 11 March 1947) is a Welsh rugby union and professional rugby league footballer who played in the 1960s, 1970s and 1980s. He played club level rugby union for Swansea RFC, and representative level rugby league for Wales, and at club level for Wigan, Blackpool Borough, Huddersfield and the Cardiff City Blue Dragons, as a wing, centre, stand-off, second-row, or loose forward.

== Background ==
Peter Rowe was born in Swansea, Wales on 11 March 1947.

== Playing career ==
=== Club career ===
Rowe joined Wigan from rugby union club Swansea RFC in October 1966. He made his debut in November 1966 v Wakefield Trinity at Central Park, Wigan. In his first season he made 19 appearances and scored 4 tries.

Peter Rowe played left wing in Wigan's 7–4 victory over St. Helens in the 1968 BBC2 Floodlit Trophy Final during the 1968–69 season at Central Park, Wigan on Tuesday 17 December 1968, and played left-centre in the 6–11 defeat by Leigh in the 1969 BBC2 Floodlit Trophy Final during the 1969–70 season at Central Park, Wigan on Tuesday 16 December 1969.

In January 1976, Rowe was transferred from Blackpool Borough to Huddersfield for a fee of £3,000.

=== International honours ===
Peter Rowe won six caps for Wales rugby union at youth level while at Swansea, captaining the 1965/6 Wales youth team. In rugby league, he won 10 caps for Wales while at Wigan, Blackpool Borough, and Huddersfield, including while at Blackpool Borough in the 1975 Rugby League World Cup against Australia, England, and Australia.
