= David Stephens (rugby) =

English rugby footballer

Personal information
- Born: unknown
- Died: July 2023 (aged 82)

Playing information

Rugby union
Club
Years	Team	Pld	T	G	FG	P
≤1964–65	Wakefield RFC

Rugby league
- Position: Wing, Centre
Club
Years	Team	Pld	T	G	FG	P
1965–67	Wigan	50+2	26	7	0	92
1967–70	Castleford	40	11	0	0	33
	Total	92	37	7	0	125

David Stephens (1940/41–2023) was a rugby union and professional rugby league footballer who played in the 1960s and 1970s. He played club level rugby union (RU) for Wakefield RFC, and club level rugby league (RL) for Wigan and Castleford, as a wing or centre.

== Background ==
David Stephens was a teacher at Airedale Secondary Modern school, Castleford c. 1970.

== Playing career ==
=== Club career ===
David Stephens changed rugby football codes from rugby union to rugby league, when he was transferred from Wakefield RFC to Wigan following a dispute regarding his position, he preferred to play at centre, whereas Wakefield RFC preferred him to play on the wing, he made his début for Wigan in the 23–10 victory over Whitehaven at Recreation Ground, Whitehaven on Wednesday 18 August 1965, he scored his first try for Wigan in the 12–17 defeat by New Zealand at Central Park, Wigan on Saturday 4 September 1965, he scored his last try (two tries) for Wigan in the 11–4 victory over Batley at Central Park, Wigan on Wednesday 13 December 1967, and he played his last match for Wigan in the 2–9 defeat by Rochdale Hornets at Athletic Grounds, Rochdale on Friday 22 December 1967.

=== County Cup Finals ===
David Stephens played on the wing in Castleford's 11–22 defeat by Leeds in the 1968 Yorkshire Cup Final during the 1968–69 season at Belle Vue, Wakefield on Saturday 19 October 1968.

== Obituary ==
His death was announced in the Wakefield Express on 3 July 2023. He left his widow, Barbara, and children Sarah, Emma, Daniel and Edward
