= Burdell =

Burdell can refer to:

== Places ==
=== Australia ===
- Burdell, Queensland, a suburb of Townsville

=== United States ===
- Burdell, California
- Burdell Township, Michigan

== Other ==
- Bob Burdell (1939–2013), English rugby footballer
- Edwin S. Burdell (1898–1978), college director and president
- George P. Burdell, fictitious student officially enrolled at Georgia Tech in 1927 as a practical joke and continuously enrolled to this day
