= Ian Stenton =

English rugby league footballer

Playing information
- Position: Centre
Club
Years	Team	Pld	T	G	FG	P
1965–73	Castleford	138	37	14	3	145
1973–77	Hull FC
	Total	138	37	14	3	145
Representative
Years	Team	Pld	T	G	FG	P
1971	Yorkshire	1	0	0	0	0

Ian Stenton is a former professional rugby league footballer who played in the 1960s and 1970s. He played at representative level for Yorkshire, and at club level for Castleford and Hull FC, as a centre.

== Playing career ==
=== County honours ===
Ian Stenton won a cap for Yorkshire while at Castleford, playing at centre in the 34-8 victory over Lancashire at Wheldon Road, Castleford on 24 February 1971.

=== Challenge Cup Final appearances ===
Ian Stenton played at centre in Castleford's 7-2 victory over Wigan in the 1970 Challenge Cup Final during the 1969–70 season at Wembley Stadium, London on Saturday 9 May 1970, in front of a crowd of 95,255.

=== BBC2 Floodlit Trophy Final appearances ===
Ian Stenton played at centre in Castleford's 7-2 victory over Swinton in the 1966 BBC2 Floodlit Trophy Final during the 1966–67 season at Wheldon Road, Castleford on Tuesday 20 December 1966, and played at centre in the 8-5 victory over Leigh in the 1967 BBC2 Floodlit Trophy Final during the 1967–68 season at Headingley, Leeds on Saturday 16 January 1968.
