= Trevor Briggs (rugby league, born 1946) =

English rugby league & union footballer

Personal information
- Born: third 1/4 1946 Leeds district, England
- Died: 3 October 2013 (aged 67)

Playing information

Rugby league
- Position: Fullback, Wing
Club
Years	Team	Pld	T	G	FG	P
1965–78	Castleford	338	92	0	0	276

Rugby union
Club
Years	Team	Pld	T	G	FG	P
≥1978–≥78	Castleford RUFC

Trevor Briggs (birth registered third 1/4 1946 – 3 October 2013) was an English professional rugby league, and amateur rugby union footballer who played in the 1960s and 1970s. He played club level rugby league (RL) for Kippax ARLFC, and Castleford (captain during the 1973–74 season), as a fullback, or wing, and club level rugby union for Castleford RUFC (in Castleford, Wakefield), under a pseudonym.

== Background ==
Trevor Briggs birth was registered in Leeds district, West Riding of Yorkshire, England, he worked as a police officer, and he died aged 67, his funeral service took place at Kippax Parish Church, Church Lane, Kippax at 12.30pm on Wednesday 23 October 2013, his committal took place at Pontefract Crematorium, Wakefield Road, Pontefract at 2.00pm, followed by a reception at Kings Croft Hotel, Wakefield Road, Pontefract.

== Playing career ==
=== Challenge Cup Final appearances ===
Trevor Briggs played on the wing in Castleford's 11–6 victory over Salford in the 1969 Challenge Cup Final during the 1968–69 season at Wembley Stadium, London on Saturday 17 May 1969, in front of a crowd of 97,939, and played on the wing in the 7–2 victory over Wigan in the 1970 Challenge Cup Final during the 1969–70 season at Wembley Stadium, London on Saturday 9 May 1970, in front of a crowd of 95,255.

=== BBC2 Floodlit Trophy Final appearances ===
Trevor Briggs played on the wing in Castleford's 4–0 victory over St. Helens in the 1965 BBC2 Floodlit Trophy Final during the 1965–66 season at Knowsley Road, St. Helens on Tuesday 14 December 1965.

=== Player's No.6 Trophy Final appearances ===
Trevor Briggs played on the wing and was voted the Player's No.6 Winner in Castleford's 25–15 victory over Blackpool Borough in the 1976–77 Player's No.6 Trophy Final during the 1976–77 season at The Willows, Salford on Saturday 22 January 1977.
