= Bill Ashurst =

English rugby league footballer (1948–2022)

Personal information
- Full name: William Frank Ashurst
- Born: 12 April 1948 Ince-in-Makerfield, Lancashire, England
- Died: 14 June 2022 (aged 74)

Playing information
- Position: Centre, Second-row
Club
Years	Team	Pld	T	G	FG	P
1968–73	Wigan	165	67	142		485
1974–76	Penrith Panthers	46	19	51	6	165
1977–78	Wigan	21	7	4	6	35
1978–84	Wakefield Trinity	32	5	15	10	55
1988	Runcorn Highfield	1	0	0	0	0
	Total	265	98	212	22	740
Representative
Years	Team	Pld	T	G	FG	P
1971–72	Lancashire	2	0	0	0	0
1971–72	Great Britain	3	3	0	0	9

Coaching information
Club
Years	Team	Gms	W	D	L	W%
1981–82	Wakefield Trinity
1987–89	Runcorn Highfield
	Total	0	0	0	0

William Frank Ashurst (12 April 1948 – 14 June 2022) was an English professional rugby league footballer who played in the 1960s, 1970s and 1980s, and coached in the 1980s. He played at representative level for Great Britain and Lancashire, and at club level for Wigan (two spells), the Penrith Panthers, Wakefield Trinity, and Runcorn Highfield, as a centre, or second-row, and coached at club level for Wakefield Trinity, Runcorn Highfield and Wigan St Patricks ARLFC (Under-16s).

== Early life ==
Ashurst was born on 12 April 1948, the son of Frank Goulding and Mary Anne Ashurst. He grew up in Ince-in-Makerfield, living with his mother and three elder sisters, and attended Rose Bridge Secondary Modern School.

Ashurst was first introduced to rugby league at the age of 10 when he watched the television broadcast of Wigan's 13-9 victory over Workington Town in the 1958 Challenge Cup Final during the 1957–58 season at Wembley Stadium, London on Saturday 10 May 1958. During his school years, he represented the Wigan Schoolboys teams in both rugby and football, and was offered a trial by Blackburn Rovers before deciding to focus on playing rugby league.

== Playing career ==
Ashurst was signed by Wigan from Rose Bridge in August 1968.

Ashurst played at centre in Wigan's 7-4 victory over St. Helens in the 1968 BBC2 Floodlit Trophy Final during the 1968–69 season at Central Park, Wigan on Tuesday 17 December 1968, played at second-row in the 6-11 defeat by Leigh in the 1969 BBC2 Floodlit Trophy Final during the 1969–70 season at Central Park, Wigan on Tuesday 16 December 1969, played second-row, and was man of the match winning the Harry Sunderland Trophy, in the 12-16 defeat by St. Helens in the Championship Final during the 1970–71 season at Station Road, Swinton on Saturday 22 May 1971, played at second-row in the 15-8 victory over Widnes in the 1971 Lancashire Cup Final during the 1971–72 season at Knowsley Road, St. Helens, on Saturday 28 August 1971 and played at second-row, and scored a try in the 13-16 defeat by Workington Town in the 1977 Lancashire Cup Final during the 1977–78 season at Wilderspool Stadium, Warrington, on Saturday 29 October 1977.

=== Penrith Panthers ===
"His attacking talent was almost otherworldly. When he was in the mood, he kicked the ball to make it bounce like a trained poodle. He usually found a way through an impenetrable wall of defenders. Every long pass he threw found the fingertips of the intended receiver."

— −Roy Masters

In 1973, Ashurst was signed by the Penrith Panthers for a record fee of £15,000, (based on increases in average earnings, this would be approximately £241,100 in 2013). While he played three seasons in the NSWRL, he became a popular figure with the new club and was notable for his prowess as a goal-kicker. This was partially due to his style of kicking: in an era where most Australian goal-kickers would approach the ball straight-on and use their toe to kick, Ashurst went "around the corner" and contacted the football with his instep, soccer-style. This produced both more power and a higher level of accuracy, and by the late 1980s most native Australian goal kickers (save for Mal Meninga) switched over to this method. In 2006, Ashurst was named in the Penrith's "Team of Legends".

=== Wakefield Trinity ===
Ashurst returned to Wigan in 1977, but was sold to Wakefield Trinity for another record fee of £18,000 in March 1978, (based on increases in average earnings, this would be approximately £136,200 in 2013). He played at second-row in Wakefield Trinity's 3-12 defeat by Widnes in the 1979 Challenge Cup Final during the 1978–79 season at Wembley Stadium, London on Saturday 5 May 1979, in front of a crowd of a crowd of 94,218. He retired from playing in 1982 due to a knee injury.

=== International honours ===
Bill Ashurst won caps for Great Britain while at Wigan in 1971 against Australia, and in 1972 against France (2 matches).

== Coaching career ==
Ashurst coached Wakefield Trinity while still playing during the 1981–82 season. He then joined Wigan as assistant coach to Alex Murphy. Ashurst also coached Runcorn Highfield between 1987 and 1989. Due to a players' strike, Ashurst came out of retirement to play in a match against former club Wigan in 1988. He was sent off during the game, and made no further appearances as a player.

== Honours ==
=== Club ===
Wigan

- League Leaders Trophy (1): 1970–71
- Lancashire League (1): 1969–70
- Lancashire Cup (1): 1971
- BBC2 Floodlit Trophy (1): 1968

=== Individual ===
- Harry Sunderland Trophy (1): 1971

Achievements
Preceded by Eric Prescott	Rugby league transfer record Wigan to Penrith Panthers; 1973	Succeeded by Mike Stephenson
