= Clive Dickinson =

English rugby league footballer

Personal information
- Born: fourth 1/4 1940 (age 84–85); Pontefract district, England

Playing information
- Position: Hooker
Club
Years	Team	Pld	T	G	FG	P
1963–75	Castleford	328	29	1	0	89
1975–7?	Hull KR	34	2	0	0	8
	Total	362	31	1	0	97
Representative
Years	Team	Pld	T	G	FG	P
1968–72	Yorkshire	6

Clive Dickinson (birth registered fourth 1/4 1940) is a former professional rugby league footballer who played in the 1960s and 1970s. He played at representative level for Yorkshire, and at club level for Castleford, as a hooker.

== Background ==
Clive Dickinson's birth was registered in Pontefract district, West Riding of Yorkshire, England, and he was a pupil, and c. 1952 he played alongside Alan Hardisty and Johnny Ward in the school rugby league team, at Ashton Road Secondary School (now the site of Smawthorne Henry Moore Primary School), Castleford.

== Playing career ==
=== County honours ===
Clive Dickinson won caps playing Hooker for Yorkshire while at Castleford in the 23–10 victory over Cumberland at Whitehaven's stadium on 11 September 1968, the 10–5 victory over Lancashire at Hull Kingston Rovers' stadium on 25 September 1968, the 12-14 Lancashire at Salford's stadium on 3 September 1969, the 32–12 victory over Lancashire at Castleford's stadium on 13 January 1971, the 34–8 victory over Lancashire at Castleford's stadium on 24 February 1971, and the 32–18 victory over Lancashire at Castleford's stadium on 11 October 1972.

=== County League appearances ===
Clive Dickinson played in Castleford's victory in the Yorkshire League during the 1964–65 season.

=== Challenge Cup Final appearances ===
Clive Dickinson played hooker in Castleford's 11–6 victory over Salford in the 1969 Challenge Cup Final during the 1968–69 season at Wembley Stadium, London on Saturday 17 May 1969, in front of a crowd of 97,939, and played hooker in the 7–2 victory over Wigan in the 1970 Challenge Cup Final during the 1969–70 season at Wembley Stadium, London on Saturday 9 May 1970, in front of a crowd of 95,255.

=== County Cup Final appearances ===
Clive Dickinson played hooker in Castleford's 11–22 defeat by Leeds in the 1968 Yorkshire Cup Final during the 1968–69 season at Belle Vue, Wakefield on Saturday 19 October 1968.

=== BBC2 Floodlit Trophy Final appearances ===
Clive Dickinson played at prop in Castleford's 4–0 victory over St. Helens in the 1965 BBC2 Floodlit Trophy Final during the 1965–66 season at Knowsley Road, St. Helens on Tuesday 14 December 1965, and played hooker in the 7–2 victory over Swinton in the 1966 BBC2 Floodlit Trophy Final during the 1966–67 season at Wheldon Road, Castleford on Tuesday 20 December 1966.
