= Tony Thomas (rugby league) =

English rugby league footballer

Playing information
- Position: Centre
Club
Years	Team	Pld	T	G	FG	P
1959–66	Wakefield Trinity	80	15	0	0	45
1966–71	Castleford	136	28	0	0	84
	Total	216	43	0	0	129

Tony Thomas is a former professional rugby league footballer who played in the 1950s, 1960s and 1970s. He played at club level for Wakefield Trinity and Castleford, as a centre.

== Playing career ==
Tony Thomas made his début for Wakefield Trinity during October 1959, and he played his last match for Wakefield Trinity during the 1966–67 season.

=== Challenge Cup Final appearances ===
Tony Thomas played at centre in Castleford's 11-6 victory over Salford in the 1969 Challenge Cup Final during the 1968–69 season at Wembley Stadium, London on Saturday 17 May 1969, in front of a crowd of 97,939, and played at centre in the 7-2 victory over Wigan in the 1970 Challenge Cup Final during the 1969–70 season at Wembley Stadium, London on Saturday 9 May 1970, in front of a crowd of 95,255.

=== County Cup Final appearances ===
Tony Thomas played at centre in Wakefield Trinity's 18-2 victory over Leeds in the 1964 Yorkshire Cup Final during the 1964–65 season at Fartown Ground, Huddersfield on Saturday 31 October 1964, and played at centre in Castleford's 11-22 defeat by Leeds in the 1968 Yorkshire Cup Final during the 1968–69 season at Belle Vue, Wakefield on Saturday 19 October 1968.

=== BBC2 Floodlit Trophy Final appearances ===
Tony Thomas played at centre in Castleford's 8-5 victory over Leigh in the 1967 BBC2 Floodlit Trophy Final during the 1967–68 season at Headingley, Leeds on Saturday 16 January 1968.
