= Mick Redfearn =

English rugby league footballer

Personal information
- Full name: Michael Redfearn
- Born: unknown

Playing information
- Position: Second-row
Club
Years	Team	Pld	T	G	FG	P
1965–77	Castleford	320	26	387	8	868

Michael Redfearn (birth unknown) is a former professional rugby league footballer who played in the 1960s and 1970s. He played at club level for Castleford.

== Playing career ==
=== Challenge Cup Final appearances ===
Michael Redfearn played at second-row in Castleford's 11-6 victory over Salford in the 1969 Challenge Cup Final during the 1968–69 season at Wembley Stadium, London on Saturday 17 May 1969, in front of a crowd of 97,939, and played at prop in the 7-2 victory over Wigan in the 1970 Challenge Cup Final during the 1969–70 season at Wembley Stadium, London on Saturday 9 May 1970, in front of a crowd of 95,255.

=== County Cup Final appearances ===
Michael Redfearn appeared as a substitute (replacing second-row Brian Lockwood) in Castleford's 11-22 defeat by Leeds in the 1968 Yorkshire Cup Final during the 1968–69 season at Belle Vue, Wakefield on Saturday 19 October 1968.

=== BBC2 Floodlit Trophy Final appearances ===
Michael Redfearn played at second-row in Castleford's 8-5 victory over Leigh in the 1967 BBC2 Floodlit Trophy Final during the 1967–68 season at Headingley, Leeds on Saturday 16 January 1968.

=== Club career ===
Michael Redfearn scored eight 2-point drop goals during his time at Castleford.
