= Bill Francis (rugby league) =

Rugby league footballer (1947–2024)

Personal information
- Full name: William Lloyd Francis
- Born: 23 September 1947 Featherstone, England
- Died: 17 February 2024 (aged 76)

Playing information
- Position: Fullback, Wing, Centre, Stand-off
Club
Years	Team	Pld	T	G	FG	P
1964–77	Wigan	400	159	43	0	563
1977–79	St. Helens	73	22	0	0	66
1979–80	Oldham	49	4	0	0	12
1980–82	Salford
	Total	522	185	43	0	641
Representative
Years	Team	Pld	T	G	FG	P
1967–78	Yorkshire	8	6	0	0	18
1975–80	Wales	19	5	0	0	15
1967–77	Great Britain	4	0	0	0	0

Coaching information
Club
Years	Team	Gms	W	D	L	W%
1979–80	Oldham RLFC
Representative
Years	Team	Gms	W	D	L	W%
1978–78	Wales	1	0	0	1	0

William Lloyd Francis (23 September 1947 – 17 February 2024) was an English-born professional rugby league footballer who played in the 1960s, 1970s and 1980s. He played at representative level for Great Britain, Wales and Yorkshire, and at club level for Wigan, St. Helens, Oldham and Salford, as a fullback, wing, centre or stand-off.

== Background ==
Francis was born in Featherstone, West Riding of Yorkshire, England, and attended Normanton Grammar School. He died on 17 February 2024, at the age of 76.

== Playing career ==
=== Wigan ===
Francis made his début for Wigan in March 1964, at the age of 16, playing on the wing in a 12–0 victory over Liverpool City in a Western Division Championship match at Central Park. He became a first team regular during the 1967–68 season, and was the club's top try scorer for the season with 29 tries. He improved on this total in 1968–69 with 40 tries, making him the league's overall top try scorer. He also won his first trophy during this season, playing in Wigan's 7–4 victory over St Helens in the 1968 BBC2 Floodlit Trophy Final at Central Park on 17 December 1968.

Francis helped Wigan win the Lancashire League during the 1969–70 season. He played in the 1969 BBC2 Floodlit Trophy final on 16 December 1969, kicking two conversions, but losing 6–11 defeat to Leigh. He also played at Wembley for the first time in the 1970 Challenge Cup final, but lost 2–7 to Castleford.

Francis also won the Lancashire Cup twice while at Wigan, playing at centre, and scoring a try in Wigan's 15–8 victory over Widnes in the 1971–72 Lancashire Cup final at Knowsley Road, St Helens on Saturday 28 August 1971, and playing fullback in a 19–9 victory over Salford in the 1973–74 Lancashire Cup final at Wilderspool Stadium, Warrington, on Saturday 13 October 1973.

He played left-centre and was sent-off for fighting with Gary Hetherington in the 78th minute in Wigan's 8–7 defeat by York in the 1976–77 Players No.6 Trophy second round during the 1976–77 season at Clarence Street, York on Sunday 7 November 1976, he scored his last try for Wigan in a 52–8 victory over Whitehaven at Central Park, Wigan on Sunday 28 August 1977, and he played his last match for Wigan in a 18–13 defeat by Bradford Northern at Odsal Stadium, Bradford on Sunday 9 October 1977.

=== St Helens ===
Francis was transferred to St Helens in October 1977 for a fee of £8,000.

He played stand-off in St Helens' 26–11 defeat by Hull Kingston Rovers in the 1977 BBC2 Floodlit Trophy Final during the 1977–78 season at Craven Park, Kingston upon Hull on Tuesday 13 December 1977, and played stand-off in a 13–7 defeat by Widnes in the 1978 BBC2 Floodlit Trophy Final during the 1978–79 season at Knowsley Road, St. Helens on Tuesday 12 December 1978.

=== Later career ===
Francis moved to Oldham, making his debut in August 1979. He then moved on to Salford during the 1980–81 season, where he finished his playing career.

=== International honours ===
Francis had Welsh ancestors, and was eligible to play for Wales due to the grandparent rule. He won caps for Wales while at Wigan in 1975 against France, England, in the 1975 Rugby League World Cup against France, England, Australia, New Zealand, England, Australia, New Zealand, and France, in 1977 against England, and France, while at St. Helens in 1978 against France, England, and Australia, in 1979 against France, and England, while at Oldham in 1980 against France, and England, and won caps for Great Britain while at Wigan in 1967 against Australia, and in the 1977 Rugby League World Cup against New Zealand, Australia (two matches).

Jointly with John Mantle, he coached Wales for one game in a 60–13 defeat by England on 28 May 1978 at Knowsley Road, St Helens; both Francis & Mantle played that day.
