= Colin Tyrer =

English rugby league footballer and coach

Personal information
- Born: 12 July 1943 (age 83) Leigh, Lancashire, England

Playing information
- Position: Fullback
Club
Years	Team	Pld	T	G	FG	P
1962–66	Leigh	112	16	206	0	460
1967–74	Wigan	246+2	88	813	0	1890
1974–76	Barrow	46	12	135	2	308
1976–78	Hull Kingston Rovers	31	4	106	0	224
	Total	437	120	1260	2	2882
Representative
Years	Team	Pld	T	G	FG	P
1966–71	Lancashire	3	0	10	0	20
1965–66	GB Under 24	2	0	2	0	4

Coaching information
Club
Years	Team	Gms	W	D	L	W%
1983	Widnes	6	6	0	0	100
- Relatives: Christian Tyrer (son)

Colin Tyrer is an English former professional rugby league footballer who played as a goal-kicking fullback for Leigh, Wigan, Barrow and Hull Kingston Rovers, and also made three representative appearances for Lancashire.

== Playing career ==
=== Leigh ===
Colin Tyrer played right wing and scored a 2-goals in Leigh's 4-15 defeat by St. Helens in the 1963 Lancashire Cup Final during the 1963–64 season at Knowsley Road, St. Helens on Saturday 26 October 1963.

=== Wigan ===
Tyrer played fullback, and scored a 2-goals in Wigan's 7–4 victory over St. Helens in the 1968 BBC2 Floodlit Trophy Final during the 1968–69 season at Central Park, Wigan on Tuesday 17 December 1968.

Tyrer played in Wigan's 2-7 defeat by Castleford in the 1970 Challenge Cup Final during the 1969–70 season at Wembley Stadium, London on Saturday 9 May 1970. Tyrer kicked a penalty early in the game, but was forced to leave the game following a collision with Castleford scrum-half Keith Hepworth, leaving Tyrer with a broken jaw. He was replaced by Cliff Hill, and was the first ever player to be substituted in a Challenge Cup final.

He played fullback, and scored a 3-goals in Wigan's 15-8 victory over Widnes in the 1971 Lancashire Cup Final during the 1971–72 season at Knowsley Road, St. Helens on Saturday 28 August 1971.

== Personal life ==
Colin Tyrer is the father of the rugby league footballer who played in the 1980s and 1990s for Wigan, Oldham and Whitehaven; Sean Tyrer, and the rugby league footballer; Christian Tyrer.
