= Alan Lowndes (rugby) =

English rugby footballer

Personal information
- Born: Stainforth, Doncaster, England

Playing information

Rugby union
Club
Years	Team	Pld	T	G	FG	P
	Carnegie College
	Wakefield RFC
	Total	0	0	0	0	0
Representative
Years	Team	Pld	T	G	FG	P
	Yorkshire

Rugby league
- Position: Wing
Club
Years	Team	Pld	T	G	FG	P
1968–77	Castleford	201	83	0	0	249
Representative
Years	Team	Pld	T	G	FG	P
1969	Yorkshire	1	1	0	0	3
1969	Great Britain U-24	1	1	0	0	3

Alan Lowndes (birth unknown) is a former rugby union and professional rugby league footballer who played in the 1960s and 1970s. He played representative level rugby union (RU) for Yorkshire, and as a trialist for England, and at club level for Carnegie College and Wakefield RFC, and representative level rugby league (RL) for Yorkshire, and at club level for Castleford, as a wing.

== Playing career ==
=== County honours ===
Alan Lowndes won a cap for Yorkshire (RL) while at Castleford; he played right wing in the 42–3 victory over Cumberland at Hull Kingston Rovers' stadium on 1 October 1969.

=== Challenge Cup Final appearances ===
Alan Lowndes played left wing in Castleford's 11–6 victory over Salford in the 1969 Challenge Cup Final during the 1968–69 season at Wembley Stadium, London on Saturday 17 May 1969, in front of a crowd of 97,939, and played left wing in the 7–2 victory over Wigan in the 1970 Challenge Cup Final during the 1969–70 season at Wembley Stadium, London on Saturday 9 May 1970, in front of a crowd of 95,255.

=== County Cup Final appearances ===
Alan Lowndes played left wing in Castleford's 7–11 defeat by Hull Kingston Rovers in the 1971 Yorkshire Cup Final during the 1971–72 season at Belle Vue, Wakefield on Saturday 21 August 1971.
