= Doug Walton (rugby league) =

GB international rugby league footballer (1945–2012)

Personal information
- Full name: Douglas Walton
- Born: 1945
- Died: 25 May 2012 (aged 65–66) Leeds, England

Playing information
- Position: Prop, Loose forward
Club
Years	Team	Pld	T	G	FG	P
1962–72	Castleford	113	12	2	0	40
Representative
Years	Team	Pld	T	G	FG	P
1968	Yorkshire	1	0	0	0	0
1965	Great Britain	1	0	0	0	0

Douglas Walton (1945 – 25 May 2012) was an English professional rugby league footballer who played in the 1960s and 1970s. He played at representative level for Great Britain and Yorkshire, and at club level for Castleford, as a prop, or loose forward.

== Playing career ==
=== International honours ===
Doug Walton won a cap for Great Britain while at Castleford playing loose forward in the 17-7 victory over France at Station Road, Swinton on Saturday 23 January 1965.

=== County honours ===
Walton won a cap for Yorkshire while at Castleford playing left-prop in the 17-23 defeat by Lancashire at Widnes stadium on Wednesday 24 January 1968.

=== County League appearances ===
Walton played in Castleford's victory in the Yorkshire League during the 1964–65 season.

=== BBC2 Floodlit Trophy Final appearances ===
Walton played right-prop in Castleford's 8-5 victory over Leigh in the 1967 BBC2 Floodlit Trophy Final during the 1967–68 season at Headingley, Leeds on Saturday 16 January 1968.

=== Club career ===
An offer of £13,000 by Wigan in the mid-1960s for Doug Walton was rejected by Castleford (based on increases in average earnings, this would be approximately £427,900 in 2013), subsequently a serious knee injury halted his progress and limited the number of his appearances.
