= Dennis Hartley =

Great Britain and England international rugby league footballer (1936–2019)

Personal information
- Full name: Dennis Hartley
- Born: 11 April 1936 Hemsworth, Wakefield, West Riding of Yorkshire, England
- Died: 13 November 2019 (aged 83)

Playing information
- Position: Prop
Club
Years	Team	Pld	T	G	FG	P
1956–60	Doncaster	120	8	11		46
1960–66	Hunslet	202	23	1		71
1966–75	Castleford	268	15	1	1	49
	Total	590	46	13	1	166
Representative
Years	Team	Pld	T	G	FG	P
1966–70	Yorkshire	4	0	0	0	0
1968	England	1	0	0	0	0
1964–70	Great Britain	11	1	0	0	3

Dennis Hartley (11 April 1936 – 13 November 2019) was an English professional rugby league footballer who played as a prop in the 1950s, 1960s and 1970s.

He played at representative level for Great Britain, England and Yorkshire, and at club level for Doncaster, Hunslet and Castleford.

== Background ==
Dennis Hartley was born in Hemsworth, Wakefield, West Riding of Yorkshire, England.

== Playing career ==
=== Doncaster ===
Hartley started his career at Doncaster, making 120 appearances for the club.

=== Hunslet ===
Hartley made 202 appearances for Hunslet between 1960 and 1966.

Hartley played at prop, in Hunslet's 16–20 defeat by Wigan in the 1965 Challenge Cup Final during the 1964–65 season at Wembley Stadium, London on Saturday 8 May 1965, in front of a crowd of 89,016.

Hartley also played at prop, and scored a try in Hunslet's 12–2 victory over Hull Kingston Rovers in the 1962 Yorkshire Cup Final during the 1962–63 season at Headingley, Leeds on Saturday 27 October 1962, and played at prop in the 8–17 defeat by Bradford Northern in the 1965 Yorkshire Cup Final during the 1965–66 season at Headingley, Leeds on Saturday 16 October 1965.

=== Castleford ===
Hartley also played at prop in Castleford's 11–6 victory over Salford in the 1969 Challenge Cup Final during the 1968–69 season at Wembley Stadium, London on Saturday 17 May 1969, in front of a crowd of 97,939, and played at prop in the 7–2 victory over Wigan in the 1970 Challenge Cup Final during the 1969–70 season at Wembley Stadium, London on Saturday 9 May 1970, in front of a crowd of 95,255.

Hartley played at prop in Castleford's 11–22 defeat by Leeds in the 1968 Yorkshire Cup Final during the 1968–69 season at Belle Vue, Wakefield on Saturday 19 October 1968, and played at prop in the 7–11 defeat by Hull Kingston Rovers in the 1971 Yorkshire Cup Final during the 1971–72 season at Belle Vue, Wakefield on Saturday 21 August 1971.

Hartley played at prop, in Castleford's 7–2 victory over Swinton in the 1966 BBC2 Floodlit Trophy Final during the 1966–67 season at Wheldon Road, Castleford on Tuesday 20 December 1966, and played at prop in the 8–5 victory over Leigh in the 1967 BBC2 Floodlit Trophy Final during the 1967–68 season at Headingley, Leeds on Saturday 16 January 1968.

=== Representative honours ===
Hartley won a cap for England while at Castleford in 1968 against Wales, and won caps for Great Britain while at Hunslet in 1964 against France (2 matches), while at Castleford in 1968 against France, in 1969 against France, in 1970 against Australia (2 matches), New Zealand (2 matches), and in the 1970 Rugby League World Cup against Australia, France and Australia.

Hartley also won caps playing at prop, for Yorkshire while at Castleford in the 17–22 defeat by Lancashire at Leeds' stadium on 21 September 1966, the 10–5 victory over Lancashire at Hull Kingston Rovers' stadium on 25 September 1968, the 12–14 defeat by Lancashire at Salford's stadium on 3 September 1969, and the 15–21 defeat by Cumberland at Whitehaven's stadium on 14 September 1970.

== Honours ==
Hartley is a Castleford Hall of Fame inductee.
