= Bill Kirkbride =

English RL coach and former rugby league footballer

Personal information
- Full name: William Kirkbride
- Born: 28 January 1944 (age 82) Workington, England

Playing information
- Height: 6 ft 1 in (185 cm)
- Weight: 14 st 0 lb (89 kg)
- Position: Prop, Second-row
Club
Years	Team	Pld	T	G	FG	P
1964–68	Workington Town	75	7
1968–69	Halifax	52	8
1969–71	Castleford	43	3	0	1	11
1971–≥71	Salford
≥1971(Loan)	→ Leigh	5	0	0	0	0
≥1971–≥71	Brisbane Souths
1979–80	Wakefield Trinity	37	4	0	0	12
1980–82	York
1983–83	Rochdale Hornets
	Total	212	22	0	1	23
Representative
Years	Team	Pld	T	G	FG	P
1967–71	Cumberland	7

Coaching information
Club
Years	Team	Gms	W	D	L	W%
1979–80	Wakefield Trinity
1980–81	York	67	30	2	35	45
1982–84	Rochdale Hornets	37	11	6	20	30
	Total	104	41	8	55	39

William Kirkbride (born 28 January 1944) is an English former professional rugby league footballer who played in the 1960s, 1970s and 1980s, and coached in the 1970s and 1980s. He played at representative level for Cumberland, and at club level for United Steel ARLFC, Workington Town, Halifax, Castleford, Salford, Leigh (Loan), Brisbane Souths, Wakefield Trinity, York and Rochdale Hornets, as a prop or second-row, and coached at club level for Wakefield Trinity, York and Rochdale Hornets.

== Background ==
Kirkbride's birth was registered in Workington, Cumberland, England.

== Playing career ==
=== Early career ===
Kirkbride made his début for Workington Town playing second-row alongside fellow Cumbrian Frank Foster in the 11-10 victory over Widnes at Naughton Park in the last game of the 1963–64 season on Tuesday 12 May 1964. He joined Halifax in 1968 for a fee of £6,000 (based on increases in average earnings, this would be approximately £165,900 in 2013). He made his début for Halifax against Leigh Miners Welfare in the Challenge Cup.

=== Castleford ===
In September 1969, he joined Castleford for a fee of £5,750. Kirkbride played at second-row and was man of the match winning the Lance Todd Trophy in Castleford's 7–2 victory over Wigan in the 1970 Challenge Cup final at Wembley Stadium, London during the 1969–70 season on 9 May 1970.

=== Salford ===
He joined Salford in 1971 for a fee of £6,000.

Kirkbride played at second-row in Salford's 7–12 defeat by Leeds in the 1972–73 Players No.6 Trophy final at Fartown Ground, Huddersfield on Saturday 24 March 1973.

=== County honours ===
Kirkbride won caps for Cumberland while at Workington Town making his début against Lancashire at Derwent Park in 1967, playing in the 17–15 victory over Australia at Derwent Park in 1967, and while at Castleford playing at second-row in the 3–42 defeat by Yorkshire at Hull Kingston Rovers' stadium on 1 October 1969, and Left-Second-row in the 15-21 defeat by Yorkshire at Whitehaven's stadium on 14 September 1970.

== Coaching career ==
=== Wakefield Trinity ===
Kirkbride was the coach in Wakefield Trinity's 3-12 defeat by Widnes in the 1979 Challenge Cup Final during the 1978–79 season at Wembley Stadium, London on Saturday 5 May 1979, in front of a crowd of a crowd of 94,218.

=== York ===
Kirkbride was the coach in York's victory in the 1980–81 Championship Second Division.

== Honours ==
Kirkbride is a Castleford Tigers Hall Of Fame Inductee.
