= Chris Young (rugby league) =

English rugby league football player

Personal information
- Full name: Christopher C. Young
- Born: c. 1945; Hull district, England
- Died: 19 December 2016 (aged 71)

Playing information
- Position: Wing
Club
Years	Team	Pld	T	G	FG	P
1964–69	Hull Kingston Rovers	163+1	85	0	0	255
	York
	Total	164	85	0	0	255
Representative
Years	Team	Pld	T	G	FG	P
1967–68	Great Britain	5	2	0	0	6
1967–71	Yorkshire	3	0	0	0	0

Christopher Young (c. 1945 – 19 December 2016) was an English professional rugby league footballer who played in the 1960s. He played at club level for Hull Kingston Rovers and York, as a wing. He also represented Great Britain, and was selected for the 1968 Rugby League World Cup.

== Background ==
Chris Young's birth was registered in Hull district, East Riding of Yorkshire, England. He died aged 71 from cancer, and his funeral service took place at Haltemprice Crematorium, Hull, on 28 December 2016, followed by a reception at the Half Moon public house in nearby Skidby.

== Playing career ==
=== Hull Kingston Rovers ===
Young made his debut for Hull Kingston Rovers in May 1964 against Widnes.

Young played right wing, and scored a try in Hull Kingston Rovers' 25–12 victory over Featherstone Rovers in the 1966 Yorkshire Cup Final during the 1966–67 season at Headingley, Leeds on 15 October 1966. He played right wing in the 8–7 victory over Hull F.C. in the 1967 Yorkshire Cup Final during the 1967–68 season at Headingley, Leeds on 14 October 1967.

Along with Keith Howe of Castleford, with 34 tries, Chris Young was the top try-scorer in the Championship First Division during the 1966–67 season.

He joined York in October 1969.

=== International honours ===
Young won caps for Great Britain while at Hull Kingston Rovers in 1967 against Australia (three matches), and France (two matches).

He was also selected for the Great Britain squad whilst at Hull Kingston Rovers for the 1968 Rugby League World Cup in Australia and New Zealand. However, along with Derek Edwards of Castleford, he did not participate in any of the three matches.
