= 1968–69 Yorkshire Cup =

- Structure: Regional knockout championship
- Teams: 16
- Winners: Leeds
- Runners-up: Castleford

The 1968–69 Yorkshire Cup was the sixty-first occasion on which the Yorkshire Cup competition had been held. Leeds won the trophy by beating Castleford by the score of 22–11. The match was played at Belle Vue, in the City of Wakefield, now in West Yorkshire. The attendance was 12,573 and receipts were £3,746.

== Background ==
This season there were no junior/amateur clubs taking part, no new entrants and no "leavers" and so the total of entries remained the same at sixteen.

This in turn resulted in no byes in the first round.

== Competition and results ==
=== Round 1 ===
Involved 8 matches (with no byes) and 16 clubs

| Game No | Fixture date | Home team | Score | Away team | Venue | Att | Rec | Notes | Ref |
|---|---|---|---|---|---|---|---|---|---|
| 1 | Fri 6 Sep 1968 | Doncaster | 7–13 | Halifax | Bentley Road Stadium/Tattersfield | | | | |
| 2 | Sat 7 Sep 1968 | Batley | 12–11 | York | Mount Pleasant | | | | |
| 3 | Sat 7 Sep 1968 | Bramley | 5–24 | Bradford Northern | McLaren Field | | | | |
| 4 | Sat 7 Sep 1968 | Dewsbury | 5–6 | Castleford | Crown Flatt | | | | |
| 5 | Sat 7 Sep 1968 | Hull F.C. | 9–30 | Leeds | Boulevard | | | | |
| 6 | Sat 7 Sep 1968 | Hunslet | 19–11 | Huddersfield | Parkside | 1,500 | | | |
| 7 | Sat 7 Sep 1968 | Wakefield Trinity | 18–30 | Hull Kingston Rovers | Belle Vue | | | (Note: The score in this match is given as 18-30 by RUGBYLEAGUEproject but in "100 Years of Rugby. The History of Wakefield Trinity 1873-1973" the score is given as 18-40 and is further described in the book as "Trinity's heaviest defeat at home in County Cup football and the highest score by any opponent on Trinity's ground for 10 years") | |
| 8 | Sun 8 Sep 1968 | Featherstone Rovers | 21–10 | Keighley | Post Office Road | | | | |

=== Round 2 - quarterfinals ===
Involved 4 matches and 8 clubs

| Game No | Fixture date | Home team | Score | Away team | Venue | Att | Rec | Notes | Ref |
|---|---|---|---|---|---|---|---|---|---|
| 1 | Mon 16 Sep 1968 | Hunslet | 5–5 | Castleford | Parkside | | | | |
| 2 | Tue 17 Sep 1968 | Featherstone Rovers | 10–18 | Leeds | Post Office Road | | | | |
| 3 | Tue 17 Sep 1968 | Halifax | 14–10 | Hull Kingston Rovers | Thrum Hall | | | | |
| 4 | Wed 18 Sep 1968 | Bradford Northern | 17–8 | Batley | Odsal | | | | |

=== Round 2 - replays ===
Involved 1 match and 2 clubs

| Game No | Fixture date | Home team | Score | Away team | Venue | Att | Rec | Notes | Ref |
|---|---|---|---|---|---|---|---|---|---|
| R | Wed 18 Sep 1968 | Castleford | 33–18 | Hunslet | Wheldon Road | | | | |

=== Round 3 – semifinals ===
Involved 2 matches and 4 clubs

| Game No | Fixture date | Home team | Score | Away team | Venue | Att | Rec | Notes | Ref |
|---|---|---|---|---|---|---|---|---|---|
| 1 | Sun 29 Sep 1968 | Bradford Northern | 15–16 | Castleford | Odsal | | | | |
| 2 | Thu 3 Oct 1968 | Halifax | 5–12 | Leeds | Thrum Hall | | | | |

=== Final ===
| Game No | Fixture date | Home team | Score | Away team | Venue | Att | Rec | Notes | Ref |
|---|---|---|---|---|---|---|---|---|---|
| | Saturday 19 October 1968 | Leeds | 22–11 | Castleford | Belle Vue | 12,573 | £3,746 | (Note: Belle Vue is the home ground of Wakefield Trinity with a capacity of approximately 12,500. The record attendance was 37,906 on the 21 March 1936 in the Challenge Cup semi-final between Leeds and Huddersfield) | |

==== Teams and scorers ====
| Leeds | № | Castleford |
|---|---|---|
| | teams | |
| Bev Risman | 1 | Derek Edwards |
| Alan Smith | 2 | Keith Howe |
| Syd Hynes | 3 | Ronald Hill |
| Bernard Watson | 4 | Tony Thomas |
| John Atkinson | 5 | David Stephens |
| Mick Shoebottom | 6 | Alan Hardisty (c) |
| Barry Seabourne | 7 | Danny Hargrave |
| Mick Clark (c) | 8 | Dennis Hartley |
| Tony Crosby | 9 | Clive Dickinson |
| Kenny Eyre | 10 | John Ward |
| Bill Ramsey | 11 | Peter Small |
| Albert Eyre | 12 | Brian Lockwood |
| Ray Batten | 13 | Malcolm "Mal" Reilly |
| John Langley | 14 | Glyn Jones |
| David Hick (for Bill Ramsey) | 15 | Michael Redfearn (for Brian Lockwood) |
| Roy Francis | Coach | Derek Turner |
| 22 | score | 11 |
| 10 | HT | 8 |
| | Scorers | |
| | Tries | |
| Alan Smith (1) | T | Ronald Hill (1) |
| Bernard Watson (1) | T | |
| John Atkinson (1) | T | |
| David Hick (1) | T | |
| | Goals | |
| Bev Risman (5) | G | Ronald Hill (2) |
| | G | Alan Hardisty (2) |
| Referee | | Joe Manley (Warrington) |
| White Rose Trophy for Man of the match | | Barry Seabourne - Leeds - scrum-half |
| sponsored by | | |

Scoring - Try = three (3) points - Goal = two (2) points - Drop goal = two (2) points

=== The road to success ===
First round
Doncaster | 7
Halifax | 13
Wakefield Trinity | 18
Hull Kingston Rovers | 30
Featherstone Rovers | 21
Keighley | 10
Hull | 9
Leeds | 30
Bramley | 5
Bradford Northern | 24
Batley | 12
York | 11
Hunslet | 19
Huddersfield | 11
Dewsbury | 5
Castleford | 6

Second round
Halifax | 14
Hull Kingston Rovers | 10
Featherstone Rovers | 10
Leeds | 18
Bradford Northern | 17
Batley | 8
Hunslet | 5 (18)
Castleford | 5 (33)

Semi-finals
Halifax | 5
Leeds | 12
Bradford Northern | 15
Castleford | 16

Final
Leeds | 22
Castleford | 11

== See also ==
- 1968–69 Northern Rugby Football League season
- Rugby league county cups
