= Frank Fox (rugby league) =

English rugby league footballer

Personal information
- Full name: Frank Fox
- Born: 22 February 1940 (age 85)

Playing information
- Height: 6 ft 0 in (1.83 m)
- Weight: 15 st 3 lb (97 kg)
- Position: Prop
Club
Years	Team	Pld	T	G	FG	P
1959–63	Halifax	130	6	0	0	18
≤1966/67–≥66/67	Hull Kingston Rovers	100+1	2	0	0	6
1967/68–70/71	Castleford	65	2	0	0	6
	Total	296	10	0	0	30
Representative
Years	Team	Pld	T	G	FG	P
1963–66	Yorkshire	3	0	0	0	0

Frank Fox (born 22 February 1940) is a former professional rugby league footballer who played in the 1960s and 1970s. He played at representative level for Yorkshire, and at club level for Halifax, Hull Kingston Rovers and Castleford, as a prop.

== Playing career ==
=== Club career ===
Fox played at prop in Halifax's 10-0 victory over Featherstone Rovers in the 1963–64 Yorkshire Cup Final during the 1963–64 season at Belle Vue, Wakefield on Saturday 2 November 1963, in front of a crowd of 13,238.

Fox played at prop in Hull Kingston Rovers' 25-12 victory over Featherstone Rovers in the 1966–67 Yorkshire Cup Final during the 1966–67 season at Headingley, Leeds on Saturday 15 October 1966, in front of a crowd of 13,241.

Fox made his dêbut for Castleford against Wakefield Trinity at Belle Vue, Wakefield on Saturday 19 August 1967, and he played his last match for Castleford against Hull F.C. at Wheldon Road, Castleford on Tuesday 31 March 1970.

Fox was an unused substitute in Castleford's 11-6 victory over Salford in the 1968–69 Challenge Cup Final during the 1968–69 season at Wembley Stadium, London on Saturday 17 May 1969, in front of a crowd of 97,939.
