= Keith Howe =

English rugby league footballer

Personal information
- Born: unknown

Playing information
- Position: Wing, Centre
Club
Years	Team	Pld	T	G	FG	P
1962–70	Castleford	167	109	0	0	327

Keith Howe (birth unknown) is a former rugby union and professional rugby league footballer who played in the 1960s and 1970s. He played club level rugby union (RU) for Rodillians RUFC (Old Boys of Rothwell Grammar School), and club level rugby league (RL) for Castleford, as a wing or centre.

== Playing career ==
=== County League appearances ===
Keith Howe played in Castleford's victory in the Yorkshire League during the 1964–65 season.

=== Challenge Cup Final appearances ===
Keith Howe played at centre in Castleford's 11–6 victory over Salford in the 1969 Challenge Cup Final during the 1968–69 season at Wembley Stadium, London on Saturday 17 May 1969, in front of a crowd of 97,939.

=== County Cup Final appearances ===
Keith Howe played on the wing in Castleford's 11–22 defeat by Leeds in the 1968 Yorkshire Cup Final during the 1968–69 season at Belle Vue, Wakefield on Saturday 19 October 1968.

=== BBC2 Floodlit Trophy Final appearances ===
Keith Howe played on the wing in Castleford's 7–2 victory over Swinton in the 1966 BBC2 Floodlit Trophy Final during the 1966–67 season at Wheldon Road, Castleford on Tuesday 20 December 1966.

=== Career records ===
Along with Chris Young of Hull Kingston Rovers, with 34 tries, Keith Howe was the top try-scorer in the Championship First Division during the 1966–67 season.
