= Mal Reilly =

GB & England international rugby league player & coach (born 1948)

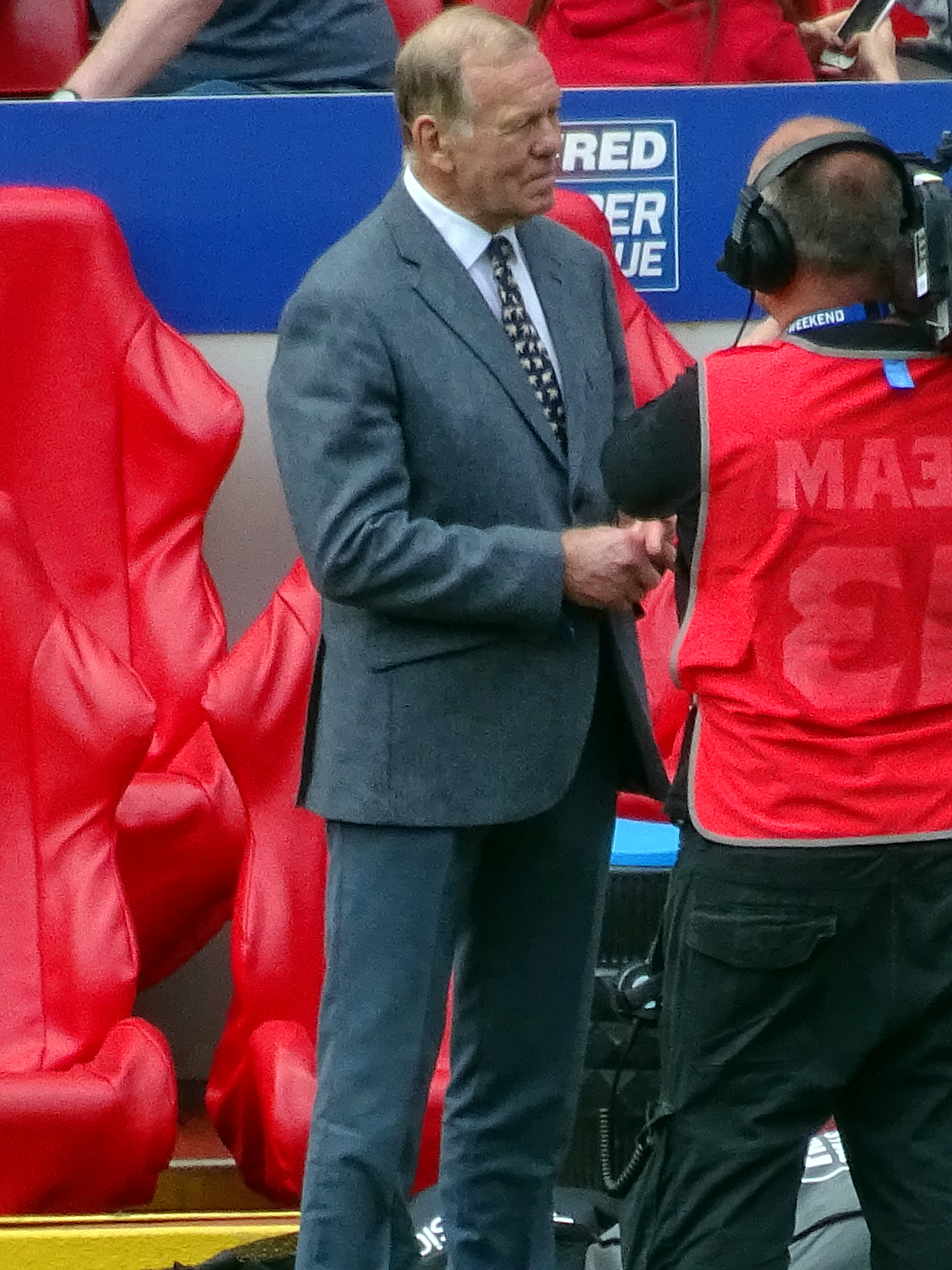

Personal information
- Full name: Malcolm John Reilly
- Born: 19 January 1948 (age 78) Barkston Ash district, Yorkshire, England

Playing information
- Position: Loose forward
Club
Years	Team	Pld	T	G	FG	P
1967–71	Castleford	117+1	32	5	6	118
1971–75	Manly-Warringah	89	13	1	0	41
1974–86	Castleford	176+21	36	1	1	112
	Total	404	81	7	7	271
Representative
Years	Team	Pld	T	G	FG	P
1968	Yorkshire	3	0	0	0	0
1973–77	England	2+1	0	0	0	0
1970	Great Britain	9	1	0	0	3

Coaching information
Club
Years	Team	Gms	W	D	L	W%
1974–87	Castleford	513	276	25	212	54
1988–89	Leeds	39	27	0	12	69
1993–94	Halifax	21	10		11	48
1995–98	Newcastle Knights	98	62	3	33	63
1999–04	Huddersfield Giants	30	5	0	25	17
2004	Hull Kingston Rovers
	Total	701	380	28	293	54
Representative
Years	Team	Gms	W	D	L	W%
1987–94	Great Britain	56	38	0	18	68
1992	England	1	1	0	0	100
1997	Rest of the World	1	0	0	1	0

Malcolm John Reilly OBE (born 19 January 1948) is an English former rugby league player and coach. He played in the 1960s, 1970s and 1980s, and coached in the 1970s, 1980s, 1990s and 2000s. He played at representative level for Great Britain, England and Yorkshire, and at club level for Castleford (two spells) in England, and Manly-Warringah Sea Eagles in Australia, as a loose forward,

He coached at representative level for Great Britain, and at club level for Castleford, Leeds, Halifax, Huddersfield Giants and Hull Kingston Rovers in England, and Newcastle Knights in Australia, taking them to their first premiership in 1997. In 2014 he was inaugurated into the British Rugby League Hall of Fame.

== Playing career ==
=== Castleford ===
Reilly debuted for Castleford during the 1967–68 season, scoring a try in an 8–10 defeat against Hunslet in September 1967. Later that season, he won his first honours with the club, playing at loose forward in Castleford's 8–5 victory over Leigh in the 1967 BBC2 Floodlit Trophy Final at Headingley, Leeds on Tuesday 16 January 1968.

During the 1968–69 season, Reilly played loose forward in Castleford's 11–22 defeat by Leeds in the 1968–69 Yorkshire Cup Final at Belle Vue, Wakefield, on Saturday 19 October 1968, and played loose forward, and won the Lance Todd Trophy in Castleford's 11–6 victory over Salford in the 1968–69 Challenge Cup final at Wembley Stadium, London on Saturday 17 May 1969.

In the 1969–70 season, Reilly played loose forward in the 7–2 victory over Wigan in the 1969–70 Challenge Cup Final at Wembley Stadium, London on Saturday 9 May 1970.

After three seasons with Manly, Reilly returned to Castleford in 1974. He played second-row in the 4–12 defeat by Leigh in the 1976 BBC2 Floodlit Trophy Final at Hilton Park on Tuesday 14 December 1976.

He played second-row in the 11–22 defeat by Leeds in the 1977–78 Yorkshire Cup Final during the 1977–78 season at Headingley Rugby Stadium, Leeds on Saturday 15 October 1977, and played prop in the 2–13 defeat by Hull F.C. in the 1983–84 Yorkshire Cup Final during the 1983–84 season at Elland Road, Leeds on Saturday 15 October 1983.

He later became a Tigers Hall Of Fame Inductee.

=== Manly-Warringah ===
After Reilly had starred for Great Britain in their triumphant 1970 Australasian Tour in which they succeeded in winning The Ashes (the last time that Great Britain has won The Ashes), he returned to play for Castleford and was selected for Great Britain during the 1970 World Cup. Managing the Australian team in the World Cup was Manly-Warringah Sea Eagles club secretary Ken Arthurson who made it a priority to sign Reilly and bring him to Sydney to play for the Brookvale based club. His signing proved a boon for Manly as his skills and toughness added to an already strong Manly forward pack (Manly had played in the 1970 Grand Final). Reilly helped them to their first premiership in 1972 when they defeated the Eastern Suburbs Roosters 19–14. Manly would repeat the feat and became premiers in 1973. He thus became only the third Englishman (after Dick Huddart and David Bolton) to play in a grand final-winning team in Australia.

Early in the 1973 Grand Final against the Cronulla-Sutherland Sharks (playing their first Grand Final), a team which was captain-coached by Reilly's former Great Britain teammate Tommy Bishop, and also included former Lions prop Cliff Watson, Reilly was felled late by Sharks hooker Ron "Rocky" Turner after putting in a mid-field chip kick (Turner had already targeted him once and just missed him only a minute into the game). Clearly hobbled with a badly bruised hip, Reilly went off for pain killing injections. As it was clear he would not last out the match, Manly coach Ron Willey gave the Englishman the instructions to go out and cause as much physical damage to the Sharks players as he could before he could go no further. After carrying out Willey's instructions, Reilly was replaced after 25 minutes by John Bucknell.

As for the match itself, the brilliance of Manly centre Bob Fulton was the difference between the two sides as the Sea Eagles won 10–7. The game has often been described as the roughest, dirtiest Grand Final in Sydney premiership history, with several all-in brawls (usually started by Bishop before retreating behind his pack) causing referee Keith Page to caution both teams repeatedly, though strangely he did not send anyone from the field despite repeated warnings that he would do so (according to Bishop, at one stage Keith Page allegedly threatened to take Manly second rower Peter Peters out the back of the Sydney Cricket Ground after the game and 'sort him out' for calling him a cheat). Leading journalist Ian Heads described the match in the Sunday Telegraph the next day as: "It was a Grand Final as tough and dirty as any bar-room brawl".

40 Years after that Grand Final, Sharks coach Tommy Bishop admitted that they did in fact target Reilly, knowing just how dangerous a player he was. Bishop also lamented the fact that while his game preparation focused on targeting his former International teammate, he somehow managed to forget about the danger that was Bob Fulton.

Although Manly made the finals in both 1974 and 1975, they were unable to repeat their premiership success. Mal Reilly would return to Castleford after the 1975 Australian season. Ironically, Ken Arthurson then signed two more Great Britain back row forwards for 1976. Second rower Phil Lowe, and lock forward Steve "Knocker" Norton who bore an uncanny resemblance to Reilly, as well as Castleford halfback Gary Stephens. Manly would win their 3rd Sydney premiership in 1976.

During his time at Manly, Mal Reilly was teammates with players who themselves would go on to become legends of the game including Bob Fulton, Graham Eadie, Ray Branighan, Fred Jones, John O'Neill, Terry Randall, and legendary try scoring winger Ken Irvine.

=== Representative honours ===
Reilly won caps for England while at Castleford in 1970 against Wales and France, and in 1977 against Wales (sub), and won caps for Great Britain while at Castleford in 1970 against Australia (3 matches), and New Zealand (3 matches), and in the 1970 Rugby League World Cup against Australia, France, and Australia.

Reilly was part of the victorious Great Britain touring team that defeated Australia in the Ashes series during the 1970 Great Britain Lions tour. As of 2015 this remains the last time Great Britain or England has won The Ashes. Australia regained The Ashes during the 1973 Kangaroo tour, and have not lost them since.

Reilly represented Yorkshire while at Castleford in 1968 against Cumberland and Lancashire.

== Coaching career ==
After retiring from playing, Reilly went on to coach Castleford, Leeds, Halifax, Great Britain, and the Newcastle Knights in Australia.

Reilly was the coach in Castleford's 15–14 victory over Hull Kingston Rovers in the 1985–86 Challenge Cup Final during the 1985–86 season at Wembley Stadium, London on Saturday 3 May 1986, in front of a crowd of 82,134.

In 1987 he succeeded Maurice Bamford as the Great Britain Lions' head coach and opened his reign as with six wins, four against France, and two over Papua New Guinea. He was included in the 1991 Birthday Honours. He stood down as Great Britain's coach in 1994.

Reilly would coach the Lions on their 1988 Oceania tour, defeating Papua New Guinea and New Zealand, but losing The Ashes to Australia. In the dead rubber third Ashes Test at the Sydney Football Stadium, Great Britain defeated Australia 26–12 for the Lions first win over the Aussies since 1978 ending a streak of 15 straight wins. His Lions then defeated the touring New Zealand in 1989 before the Lions toured Papua New Guinea and New Zealand in 1990. The Lions drew the 2-game series with PNG before defeating the Kiwis 2–1. Back home in England, the Lions then faced the 1990 Kangaroos, now coached by former Manly teammate Bob Fulton. After winning the first test over the Australian's at Wembley (giving the Lions 2 straight wins over Australia after having won the 3rd test of the 1988 series), Reilly's men came within 10 minutes of winning The Ashes for the first time since 1970, but it was not to be as Australia would win the second and third tests. After wins over France and the touring Papua New Guinea side in 1991, Reilly then coached his record 3rd Lions tour in 1992. After defeating the Kumuls in Port Moresby, the Lions then again pushed the Fulton coached Australian's, including recording their largest win over Australia in Australia with a stunning 33–10 win in Melbourne, though ultimately the Aussie's again won The Ashes 2–1. Britain then drew their series with New Zealand 1–all, Losing the first test 15–14 before winning the second 19–16 to end the tour on a high note.

The Lions win in the 2nd test in Auckland also assured them a place in the 1992 Rugby League World Cup final against Australia in October. As the top qualifier over the 4 year World Cup tournament, the game was to be played in Australia. However the Australian Rugby League (headed by Ken Arthurson) agreed to have the game moved to the larger Wembley Stadium which at 82,000 had a spectator capacity almost twice as much as the largest Australian venue, the 42,500 seat Sydney Football Stadium. This also gave Mal Reilly's team home ground advantage. In a tense Final played in front of a then international rugby league record attendance of 73,631 fans, Australian débutante centre Steve Renouf scored the only try of the game to give the Aussies a hard-fought 10–6 win after the Lions had led 6–4 at half time. Reilly would then go on to win his final 6 games as Great Britain coach, achieving 3 wins over France and sweeping New Zealand 3–0 during their 1993 European tour.

Reilly coached just one England game; a 36–11 win over Wales on 27 Nov 1992 at Vetch Field, Swansea.

Reilly quit as Great Britain coach in early 1994 (his place was taken by former Lions captain Ellery Hanley who was still playing for Leeds at the time). He then took over as coach of Australian club; the Newcastle Knights for the 1995 ARL season, and their results improved markedly. He later coached them to their first grand final at the end of the 1997 ARL season which they won when they defeated his old club and defending Premiers Manly (coached by Bob Fulton) 22–16 after winger Darren Albert scored a try under the posts with only seconds remaining.

On 11 July 1997, he was coach for a one-off game at the Suncorp Stadium, Brisbane, Australia v Rest of the World; Australia won 28-8

In 2001 Reilly's book, Reilly: A Life in Rugby League was published. His coaching career continued but he had less success as head coach of the Huddersfield Giants, who finished bottom of Super League under his stewardship. He left the Leeds Rhinos at the end of the 2003's Super League VIII following a major coaching re-structuring. In December 2004, Hull Kingston Rovers appointed Mal Reilly as director of rugby and first team coach. However, Reilly left the club midway through the season.

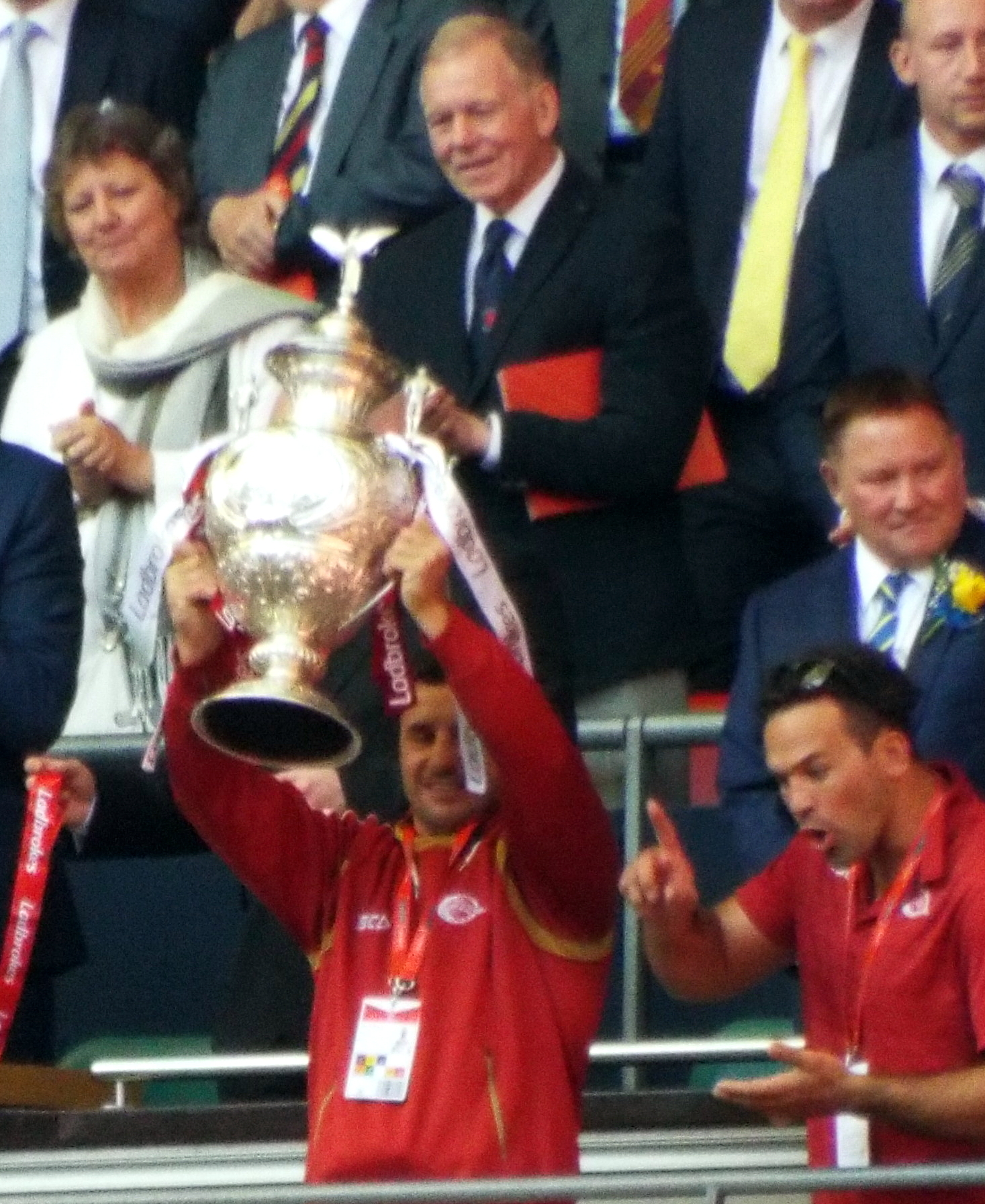
Reilly at the 2018 Challenge Cup Final

=== County Cup Final appearances ===
Reilly was the coach in Castleford's 18–22 defeat by Hull Kingston Rovers in the 1985–86 Yorkshire Cup Final during the 1985–86 season at Headingley Rugby Stadium, Leeds on Sunday 27 October 1985, was the coach in the 31–24 victory over Hull F.C. in the 1986–87 Yorkshire Cup Final during the 1986–87 season at Headingley Rugby Stadium, Leeds on Saturday 11 October 1986, and was the coach in the 13–33 defeat by Leeds in the 1988–89 Yorkshire Cup Final during the 1988–89 season at Elland Road, Leeds on Sunday 16 October 1988.

=== Best Coached XIII ===
In a 2017 video interview with Rugby AM, Reilly named the best XIII that he had ever coached. That side was:

Robbie O'Davis (Newcastle), Martin Offiah (Great Britain), John Joyner (Castleford), Keith Senior (Great Britain), Jason Robinson (Great Britain), Garry Schofield (Leeds, Great Britain), Andrew Johns (Newcastle), Paul Harragon (Newcastle), Kevin Beardmore (Castleford), Kevin Ward (Castleford, Great Britain), Adam Muir (Newcastle), Denis Betts (Great Britain), Ellery Hanley (Great Britain).

== Outside rugby league ==
Reilly used to work as a sales representative in the Newcastle, New South Wales area, but lives in the UK once again.

== Honoured by Arriva Yorkshire ==
Arriva Yorkshire honoured 13 rugby league footballers on Thursday 20 August 2009, at a ceremony at The Jungle, the home of the Castleford Tigers. A fleet of new buses were named after the 'Arriva Yorkshire Rugby League Dream Team'. Members of the public nominated the best ever rugby league footballers to have played in West Yorkshire, supported by local rugby league journalists; James Deighton from BBC Leeds, and Tim Butcher, editor of Rugby League World. The 'Arriva Yorkshire Rugby League Dream Team' included Reilly.

Achievements
Preceded by Brian Shaw	Rugby league transfer record Castleford to Manly-Warringah; 1971–72	Succeeded by Eric Prescott
