= Mick Clark =

Great Britain international rugby league footballer

Personal information
- Full name: Michael Clark
- Born: c. 1937 Leeds, England
- Died: 6 March 2015 (aged 78)

Playing information
- Position: Second-row, Prop
Club
| Years | Team | Pld | T | G | FG | P |
|---|---|---|---|---|---|---|
| ≤1961–61 | Dewsbury |
| 1961–62 | Huddersfield |
| 1962–63 | Salford |
| 1963–69 | Leeds | 205 | 19 | 0 | 0 | 57 |
| 1969–≥69 | Keighley |
| | Total | 205 | 19 | 0 | 0 | 57 |
Representative
| Years | Team | Pld | T | G | FG | P |
| 1967–≥67 | Yorkshire | ≥2 |
| 1968 | Great Britain | 5 | 0 | 0 | 0 | 0 |

Coaching information
Club
| Years | Team | Gms | W | D | L | W% |
| 1970–72 | Keighley |

Michael Clark (c. 1937 – 6 March 2015) was an English professional rugby league footballer who played in the 1950s and 1960s, and coached in the 1960s and 1970s. He played at representative level for Great Britain and Yorkshire, and at club level for Dewsbury, Huddersfield, Salford, Leeds (captain) and Keighley, as a prop or second-row, and coached at club level for Keighley.

== Playing career ==
=== Huddersfield ===
After starting his rugby league career with Dewsbury, Clark was signed by Huddersfield in February 1961 in exchange for Keith Balmforth. He played for Huddersfield against Wakefield Trinity in the 1962 Challenge Cup Final at Wembley. In September 1962, Clark and team-mate David Flint were transferred to Salford in exchange for Bob Preece and a fee of £2,500.

=== Leeds ===
In September 1963, Clark joined Leeds from Salford for a fee of £2,000.

Clark played second-row in Leeds' 2–18 defeat by Wakefield Trinity in the 1964 Yorkshire Cup Final during the 1964–65 season at Fartown Ground, Huddersfield on Saturday 31 October 1964.

Clark played prop and was captain in Leeds' 11–10 victory over Wakefield Trinity in the 1968 Challenge Cup "Watersplash" final during the 1967–68 season at Wembley Stadium, London on Saturday 11 May 1968.

Clark played prop, and was captain in Leeds' 11–10 victory over Castleford in the 1968 Yorkshire Cup Final during the 1968–69 season at Belle Vue, Wakefield on Saturday 19 October 1968.

Clark played his last match for Leeds in October 1969, joining Keighley for a fee of £1,500.

=== Representative honours ===
Clark won caps for Yorkshire while at Leeds against Cumberland at Wheldon Road, Castleford, and against Lancashire at Naughton Park, Widnes.

Clark won caps for, and was captain of, Great Britain while at Leeds in 1968 against France (2 matches), and in the 1968 Rugby League World Cup against Australia, France, and New Zealand.

== Coaching career ==
In 1970, Clark was appointed as coach at Keighley. He resigned in March 1972.
