= Christian Tyrer =

English rugby league and rugby union footballer

Personal information
- Full name: Christian Tyrer
- Born: 19 December 1973 (age 51)

Playing information

Rugby league
- Position: Stand-off
Club
Years	Team	Pld	T	G	FG	P
1993–96	Widnes Vikings	78	16	130	6	330
1998–99	Keighley Cougars	34	3	18	3	51
	Total	112	19	148	9	381

Rugby union
Club
Years	Team	Pld	T	G	FG	P
1996–97	Bath	5	2	0	0	10
- Father: Colin Tyrer

Christian Tyrer (born 19 December 1973) is a professional rugby league and rugby union footballer who played in the 1990s. He played club level rugby league for Widnes Vikings and Keighley Cougars, as a stand-off, and club level rugby union for Bath.

== Club career ==
Tyrer made his debut for Widnes Vikings in 1993 against St Helens.

== Personal life ==
Christian Tyrer is the son of the rugby league footballer; Colin Tyrer, and the brother of the rugby league footballer who played in the 1980s and 1990s for Wigan, Oldham and Whitehaven; Sean/Shaun Tyrer.
