= Frank Myler =

English rugby league footballer & coach (1938–2020)

Personal information
- Full name: Francis Myler
- Born: 4 December 1938 Widnes, England
- Died: 27 March 2020 (aged 81)

Playing information
- Position: Stand-off
Club
Years	Team	Pld	T	G	FG	P
1955–67	Widnes	367	144	7	14	474
1967–71	St. Helens	144	46	2	4	150
1972–73	Rochdale Hornets	50	9	0	0	27
	Total	561	199	9	18	651
Representative
Years	Team	Pld	T	G	FG	P
1960–70	Great Britain	24	5	0	0	15
1962	England	1	0	0	0	0
196?	Lancashire		0	0	0	0

Coaching information
Club
Years	Team	Gms	W	D	L	W%
1971–74	Rochdale Hornets	144	76	5	63	53
1975–78	Widnes	134	88	4	42	66
1980–81	Swinton	44	24	2	18	55
1981–87	Oldham	290	126	154	10	43
1991–92	Widnes	35	18	0	17	51
	Total	647	332	165	150	51
Representative
Years	Team	Gms	W	D	L	W%
1973–84	Great Britain	11	5	0	6	45
1978	England	1	1	0	0	100

Frank Myler (4 December 1938 – 27 March 2020) was an English former professional rugby league footballer who played in the 1950s, 1960s and 1970s, and coached in the 1970s and 1980s. A Great Britain and England national representative centre or stand-off, he played at club level for Widnes and St. Helens, and also captained and coached Great Britain.

== Playing career ==
Myler played left-centre and scored a try in Widnes' 13–5 victory over Hull Kingston Rovers in the 1963–64 Challenge Cup Final at Wembley Stadium, London on Saturday 9 May 1964, in front of a crowd of 84,488. Myler played left-centre in St. Helens' 30–2 victory over Oldham in the 1968–69 Lancashire Cup Final at Central Park, Wigan on Friday 25 October 1968. Myler played at left-centre in St. Helens' 4–7 defeat by Wigan in the 1968 BBC2 Floodlit Trophy Final at Central Park, Wigan on Tuesday 17 December 1968.

In the 1969–70 Northern Rugby Football League season's Championship Final Myler was voted man of the match winning the Harry Sunderland Trophy in St. Helens 24–12 victory over Leeds. In 1970, he captained the Lions squad. Following a heavy defeat in the first Test the Lions under Myler did not lose another game on the whole tour. Myler remains the last British captain to lift the Ashes trophy in Australia. He played stand-off in the 4–7 defeat by Leigh in the 1970–71 Lancashire Cup Final at Station Road, Swinton on Saturday 28 November 1970. Myler left St. Helens in 1971 to take up the position of player-coach with the Rochdale Hornets from May 1971 until October 1974.

== Coaching career ==
After three seasons at Rochdale where he took the team to the Players No 6 trophy final, although they lost 27–16 to Warrington, Myler succeeded Vince Karalius as Widnes coach in May 1975. In May 1978 he was succeeded as Widnes coach by Doug Laughton. After periods coaching at Oldham and Swinton Myler was appointed Great Britain coach in 1983 but after some early successes the team lost all six test matches to Australia and New Zealand during the 1984 Great Brian Lions tour and despite a win over Papua New Guinea in the last test of the tour Myler was not reappointed as coach. Thereafter, he returned to club coaching with Oldham and a second spell at Widnes.

Myler coached England for one fixture beating Wales 60-13 on 28 May 1978.

Myler returned to Widnes in 1991-92 and coached the club to a 24-0 victory over Leeds in the Regal Trophy Final at Central Park, Wigan on 11th January 1992.

Myler was one of the original thirteen former Widnes players inducted into the Widnes Hall of Fame in 1992.

Myler died on 27 March 2020 after a long illness, aged 81.
