= Ronald Hill (rugby) =

Wales rugby league footballer and commentator

Ron Hill
Personal information
- Full name: Ronald S. Hill
- Born: unknown

Playing information

Rugby union
Club
Years	Team	Pld	T	G	FG	P
≤1964–≤64	Cardiff RFC	9		13+4

Rugby league
- Position: Loose forward
Club
Years	Team	Pld	T	G	FG	P
1964–68	Castleford	83	14	159	2	364
1968–≥70	Salford	37+1	11	114	0	261
1970–71	Featherstone Rovers	2	0	0	0	0
	Total	123	25	273	2	625
Representative
Years	Team	Pld	T	G	FG	P
1969–70	Wales	2

Coaching information
Club
Years	Team	Gms	W	D	L	W%
1977	Dewsbury RLFC

Ronald "Ron" S. Hill (birth unknown) is a Welsh former rugby union, and professional rugby league footballer who played in the 1960s and 1970s, and rugby league commentator for BBC Radio Leeds. He played club level rugby union (RU) for Cardiff RFC, and representative level rugby league (RL) for Wales, and at club level for Castleford, Salford and Featherstone Rovers, as a goal-kicking loose forward.

== Playing career ==
=== International honours ===
Hill won 2 caps for Wales (RL) in 1969–1970 while at Salford.

=== County League appearances ===
Hill played in Castleford's victory in the Yorkshire League during the 1964–65 season.

=== County Cup Final appearances ===
Hill played at centre, and scored a try, and two goals in Castleford's 11–22 defeat by Leeds in the 1968 Yorkshire Cup Final during the 1968–69 season at Belle Vue, Wakefield on Saturday 19 October 1968.
