= Jack Brennan (rugby league) =

English rugby league footballer (1935 or 1936 – 2025)

Personal information
- Born: 1935 or 1936 Wigan, Lancashire, England
- Died: August 2025 (aged 89)

Playing information
- Position: Scrum-half, Stand-off, Loose forward
Club
Years	Team	Pld	T	G	FG	P
1955–59	Blackpool Borough	121	37	0	0	111
1959–70	Salford	329	70	3		216
1970–71	Warrington	3	1	0		3
	Total	453	108	3	0	330
Representative
Years	Team	Pld	T	G	FG	P
1958	Lancashire	2	2	0	0	6

Jack Brennan (1935 or 1936 – August 2025) was an English professional rugby league footballer who played as a scrum-half. Born in Wigan, Brennan began his career at Blackpool Borough, and went on to play for Salford and Warrington. He also represented Lancashire.

== Career ==
=== Club career ===
Brennan started his rugby league career with Blackpool Borough, joining the club at the age of seventeen. In August 1959, he joined Salford for a fee of £5,000.

In 1969, he played in the Challenge Cup Final at Wembley Stadium against Castleford, which Salford lost 6–11. He joined Warrington during the 1970–71 season, but retired after only three appearances for the club.

=== Representative career ===
Brennan made two appearances for Lancashire in 1958 whilst at Blackpool Borough, losing both games to Yorkshire.

== Death ==
On 13 August 2025, it was announced that Brennan had died at the age of 89.
