= Brian Lockwood =

Great Britain and England rugby league footballer (1946–2024)

Personal information
- Born: 8 October 1946 Castleford, England
- Died: 10 October 2024 (aged 78)

Playing information
- Position: Prop, Loose forward
Club
Years	Team	Pld	T	G	FG	P
1965–75	Castleford	231	38	8	0	130
1974	Canterbury-Bankstown	16	1	0	0	3
1975–77	Balmain Tigers	43	2	0	0	6
1976–77	Wakefield Trinity	25	5	0	0	15
1978–80	Hull Kingston Rovers	74+1	11	0	0	33
1980–81	Oldham	13	1	0	0	3
1981–83	Widnes	39	1	0	0	3
	Total	442	59	8	0	193
Representative
Years	Team	Pld	T	G	FG	P
1970–79	Great Britain	16	1	0	0	3
1970–79	England	3	0	0	0	0

Coaching information
Club
Years	Team	Gms	W	D	L	W%
1976–78	Wakefield Trinity
1984	Huddersfield	27	13	1	13	48
1985–87	Batley
	Total	27	13	1	13	48
- Relatives: Roger Millward (cousin)

Brian Lockwood (8 October 1946 – 10 October 2024) was an English World Cup winning former professional rugby league footballer who played in the 1960s, 1970s and 1980s, and coached in the 1980s. He played at representative level for Great Britain, England and Yorkshire, and at club level for Castleford, Canterbury-Bankstown, Balmain, Wakefield Trinity, Hull Kingston Rovers, Oldham and Widnes, as a prop or second-row, and coached at club level for Wakefield Trinity, Huddersfield and Batley.

== Background ==
Brian Lockwood was born in Castleford on 8 October 1946. He was the landlord of The Bay Horse, Methley, The Boat, Allerton Bywater, and The Sun Inn, 719 Leeds Road, Lofthouse Gate, Wakefield c. 1980s.

== Playing career ==
=== Castleford ===
Lockwood played right-second-row in Castleford’s 11-6 victory over Salford in the 1968–69 Challenge Cup Final at Wembley Stadium, London on Saturday 17 May 1969, in front of a crowd of 97,939, played right-second-row in the 7–2 victory over Wigan in the 1969–70 Challenge Cup Final at Wembley Stadium] on Saturday 9 May 1970, in front of a crowd of 95,255.

Lockwood played right-second-row (replaced by substitute Michael Redfearn) in Castleford's 11-22 defeat by Leeds in the 1968–69 Yorkshire Cup Final at Belle Vue, Wakefield on Saturday 19 October 1968, and played right-second-row in the 7-11 defeat by Hull Kingston Rovers in the 1971–72 Yorkshire Cup Final at Belle Vue, Wakefield on Saturday 21 August 1971.

=== Career in Australia ===
Lockwood moved to Sydney's Canterbury-Bankstown Bulldogs club in 1974, reaching the Grand Final with them that year. He later joined the Balmain Tigers, winning the 1976 Amco Cup Final with a famous inside pass to Neil Pringle for the match winning try.

=== Hull Kingston Rovers ===
Lockwood was signed by Hull Kingston Rovers in January 1978.

Lockwood played right-prop in Hull Kingston Rovers' 3-13 defeat by Hull F.C. in the 1979 BBC2 Floodlit Trophy Final at The Boulevard, Hull on Tuesday 18 December 1979.

Lockwood played right-prop and was man of the match, winning the Lance Todd Trophy, in Hull Kingston Rovers' 10-5 victory over Hull F.C. in the 1979–80 Challenge Cup Final at Wembley on Saturday 3 May 1980, in front of a crowd of 95,000. He left the club at the end of the season to sign for Oldham.

=== Widnes ===
Lockwood joined Widnes in January 1981 for an undisclosed fee.

Lockwood played right-prop in Widnes' 18-9 victory over Hull Kingston Rovers in the 1980–81 Challenge Cup Final at Wembley on Saturday 2 May 1981, in front of a crowd of 92,496, and played right-prop in the 14–14 draw with Hull F.C. in the 1981–82 Challenge Cup Final at Wembley on Saturday 1 May 1982, in front of a crowd of 92,147, played right-prop in the 9-18 defeat by Hull F.C. in the 1981–82 Challenge Cup Final replay at Elland Road, Leeds on Wednesday 19 May 1982, in front of a crowd of 41,171.

He played right-prop in Widnes' 3-8 defeat by Leigh in the 1981–82 Lancashire Cup Final at Central Park, Wigan on Saturday 26 September 1981.

=== Representative honours ===
Lockwood won caps for England while at Castleford in 1970 against France (sub), and while at Hull Kingston Rovers in 1979 against Wales, and France, and won caps for Great Britain while at Castleford in the 1972 Rugby League World Cup against Australia (2 matches), France, and New Zealand, in 1973 against Australia (2 matches), in 1974 against France, while at Hull Kingston Rovers in 1978 against Australia, and in 1979 New Zealand (sub).

Lockwood won caps for Yorkshire while at Castleford playing left-second-row, in the 12–14 defeat by Lancashire at Salford's stadium on 3 September 1969, playing left-second-row in the 15–21 defeat by Cumberland at Whitehaven's stadium on 14 September 1970, as a substitute in the 32–12 victory over Lancashire at Castleford's stadium on 13 January 1971, playing left-second-row in the 34–8 victory over Lancashire at Castleford on 24 February 1971, playing left-second-row in the 32–18 victory over Lancashire at Castleford stadium on 11 October 1972, and left-second-row in the 20-7 victory over Lancashire at Headingley, Leeds on 17 January 1973.

== Coaching career ==
=== Club career ===
Brian Lockwood was the coach of Batley from November 1985 to May 1987.

== Honours ==
- Open Rugby World XIII: 1980
- Castleford Tigers Hall Of Fame Inductee.

== Personal life and death ==
Lockwood married Anne (née Stead) in c. 1967 in Allerton Bywater. He had 3 children a son Kieron a daughter Taryn and a son Jarrod. His cousin was the rugby league footballer and coach Roger Millward.

Brian Lockwood died on 10 October 2024, at the age of 78.
