= Derek Edwards (rugby league) =

GB international rugby league footballer (c.1943–2020)

Personal information
- Full name: Derek Edwards
- Born: 17 September 1942 Castleford, England
- Died: 27 January 2020 (aged 77)

Playing information
- Position: Fullback
Club
Years	Team	Pld	T	G	FG	P
1960–72	Castleford	309	38	0	0	116
1972–74	Leeds
1974–≥74	Keighley
	Total	309	38	0	0	116
Representative
Years	Team	Pld	T	G	FG	P
1969–71	Yorkshire	5	0	0	0	0
1968–71	Great Britain	5	0	0	0	0

Coaching information
Club
Years	Team	Gms	W	D	L	W%
1975–76	Doncaster RLFC	0	0	0	0

Derek Edwards (17 September 1942 – 27 January 2020) was an English professional rugby league footballer who played in the 1960s and 1970s. He played at representative level for Great Britain and Yorkshire, and at club level for Castleford and Keighley as a fullback.

== Playing career ==
=== Club career ===
Born in Castleford, Edwards started his career with his hometown club Castleford during the 1960–61 season. He won his first trophy with the club in 1965, playing at full-back in Castleford's 4–0 victory over St. Helens in the inaugural BBC2 Floodlit Trophy final on Tuesday 14 December 1965. Castleford won the trophy again in the two following seasons, with Edwards playing in both games — a 7–2 victory over Swinton in the 1966 BBC2 Floodlit Trophy final on Tuesday 20 December 1966, and an 8–5 victory over Leigh in the 1967 BBC2 Floodlit Trophy final on Saturday 16 January 1968.

During the 1968–69 season, Edwards played full-back in Castleford's 11–22 defeat by Leeds in the 1968 Yorkshire Cup final on Saturday 19 October 1968. At the end of the season, Castleford won the 1969 Challenge Cup final, with Edwards playing full-back in a 11–6 victory over Salford on Saturday 17 May 1969. He also played in the 7–2 victory over Wigan in the 1970 Challenge Cup final on Saturday 9 May 1970 in the following season.

In his final season at the club, he played full-back in the 7–11 defeat by Hull Kingston Rovers in the 1971 Yorkshire Cup final on Saturday 21 August 1971.

Edwards did not play for Castleford during the 1972–73 season due to a dispute with the club. He was eventually sold to Leeds for a fee of £5,000 in December 1972. In the 1973–74 season, he was transferred to Keighley.

He played 21 games for Keighley during the 1974–75 season.

=== Representative honours ===
Edwards won caps for Yorkshire while at Castleford as a substitute in the 12–14 defeat by Lancashire at Salford's stadium on 3 September 1969, as a substitute in the 42–3 victory over Cumberland at Hull Kingston Rovers' stadium on 1 October 1969, playing full-back in the 15–21 defeat by Cumberland at Whitehaven's stadium on 14 September 1970, playing full-back in the 22–42 defeat by Lancashire at Leigh's stadium on 29 September 1971, and Fullback in the 17–12 victory over Cumberland at Wakefield Trinity's stadium on 20 October 1971.

Edwards won caps for Great Britain while at Castleford in 1968 against France, in 1970 against Australia, and in 1971 against New Zealand (3 matches).

Edwards was selected for the Great Britain Squad while at Castleford for the 1968 Rugby League World Cup in Australia and New Zealand. However, along with Chris Young of Hull Kingston Rovers, he did not participate in any of the three matches.
