= Dennis Harris (rugby league) =

English rugby league footballer

Playing information
- Position: Wing
Club
Years	Team	Pld	T	G	FG	P
1964–71	Castleford	36	14	2	0	46

Dennis Harris is a former professional rugby league footballer who played in the 1960s and 1970s. He played at club level for Castleford as a wing.

== Playing career ==
=== County League appearances ===
Dennis Harris played in Castleford's victory in the Yorkshire League during the 1964–65 season.

=== BBC2 Floodlit Trophy Final appearances ===
Dennis Harris played on the wing in Castleford's 8-5 victory over Leigh in the 1967 BBC2 Floodlit Trophy Final during the 1967–68 season at Headingley, Leeds on Saturday 16 January 1968.
