= Bob Burdell =

English rugby league footballer

Personal information
- Full name: Robert B. Burdell
- Born: 1 February 1939 Southport, Lancashire, England
- Died: 15 May 2013 (aged 74) Spain

Playing information

Rugby union
Club
Years	Team	Pld	T	G	FG	P
	Southport RFC

Rugby league
- Position: Hooker
Club
Years	Team	Pld	T	G	FG	P
1960–63	Liverpool City
1963–65	St. Helens	24	1	0		3
1965–70	Salford	115	6	1		20
1970–72	Wigan	34	1	0		3
	Total	173	8	1	0	26
Representative
Years	Team	Pld	T	G	FG	P
1967–68	Lancashire	3	0	0	0	0

Robert Burdell (1 February 1939 – 15 May 2013) was an English rugby union and rugby league footballer. Born in Southport, Burdell began his career as a rugby union player with his hometown club Southport RFC before switching to rugby league in 1960. He went to play as a hooker for Liverpool City, St. Helens, Salford and Wigan, and also appeared for Lancashire at representative level.

== Early life and rugby union career ==
Burdell was born on 1 February 1939 and grew up with his two brothers in Birkdale, Southport. He attended King George V Grammar School, where he was first introduced to rugby union. He went on to play for Southport RFC, becoming the youngest ever player to be picked for the first team.

== Rugby league career ==
In the 1960s, Burdell switched codes to rugby league, and played for several clubs, including Liverpool City, St. Helens, Salford and Wigan.

Burdell played for Wigan in the 1970 Challenge Cup final, which Wigan lost 2–7 against Castleford.

== Death ==
After falling ill earlier in the year, Burdell died on 15 May 2013 in Spain, aged 74.
