= Billy Thompson (referee) =

British rugby league referee (1937–2021)

Billy Thompson MBE
Personal information
- Full name: William Henry Thompson
- Born: 21 September 1933 Huddersfield, West Riding of Yorkshire, England
- Died: February 2021 (aged 87)

Refereeing information
Years	Competition	Apps
1967–84	Rugby Football League Championship
1968–80	Internationals

William Henry Thompson MBE (21 September 1933 – February 2021) was a British rugby league referee. He refereed 17 Test matches, including the World Cup final in 1977. He also refereed three Challenge Cup Finals.

Thompson was appointed Member of the Order of the British Empire (MBE) in the 1985 Birthday Honours for services to rugby league.

== Biography ==
Born in Huddersfield, Thompson was an aspiring footballer in his younger years, and was on the books at Gillingham, but failed to make the grade. He became a referee, and was added to the Rugby Football League's Grade One referee's list during the 1967–68 season.

He took charge of his first Challenge Cup final in 1971, and became the first referee to send off a player in a Challenge Cup final when he dismissed Syd Hynes for an alleged headbutt on Alex Murphy.

In 1980, he refereed the inaugural State of Origin game between Queensland and New South Wales in Australia.

His final game as a referee was the 1984 Challenge Cup final, after which he was forced to retire, aged 50.

== Death ==
His death was announced in February 2021, at the age of 87.
