= Keith Hepworth =

GB international rugby league footballer and coach (1941–2024)

Personal information
- Born: 1942 Castleford, West Riding of Yorkshire, England
- Died: 14 November 2024 (aged 82)

Playing information
- Position: Scrum-half
Club
Years	Team	Pld	T	G	FG	P
1958–71	Castleford	329	66	4	14	234
1971–76	Leeds	177
1976–80	Hull FC	64	11			44
1980–82	Bramley	11
	Total	581	77	4	14	278
Representative
Years	Team	Pld	T	G	FG	P
1965–66	Commonwealth XIII	1
1964–71	Yorkshire	5	3	0	0	9
1967–71	Great Britain	11	1	0	0	3

Coaching information
Club
Years	Team	Gms	W	D	L	W%
1980–82	Bramley
1988	Hull FC
	Total	0	0	0	0

Keith Hepworth (1942 – 14 November 2024) was an English professional rugby league footballer who played in the 1950s, 1960s and 1970s, and coached in the 1980s. He played at representative level for Great Britain, Yorkshire and Commonwealth XIII, and at club level for Castleford, Leeds and Hull FC, as a scrum-half, and coached at club level for Bramley and Hull FC.

== Playing career ==
=== Castleford ===
Hepworth played in Castleford's victory in the Yorkshire League during the 1964–65 season.

Hepworth played scrum-half, and scored a goal in Castleford's 7–2 victory over Swinton in the 1966 BBC2 Floodlit Trophy final on Tuesday 20 December 1966, and played scrum-half in the 8–5 victory over Leigh in the 1967 BBC2 Floodlit Trophy final on Saturday 16 January 1968.

Hepworth played scrum-half, and scored a try in Castleford's 11–6 victory over Salford in the 1969 Challenge Cup final on Saturday 17 May 1969, and played scrum-half, in the 7–2 victory over Wigan in the 1970 Challenge Cup final on Saturday 9 May 1970. Keith Hepworth's collision with Wigan's Fullback Colin Tyrer, left Tyrer with a broken jaw.

Hepworth's Testimonial match at Castleford took place in 1968. He was named as a Castleford Tigers Hall Of Fame Inductee.

=== Leeds ===
In October 1971, Leeds signed Hepworth from Castleford for a fee of £4,000.

Hepworth played scrum-half in Leeds' 13–16 defeat by St. Helens in the 1972 Challenge Cup Final on Saturday 13 May 1972.

Hepworth played scrum-half, and was man of the match in Leeds' 12–7 victory over Salford in the 1972–73 Player's No.6 Trophy Final at Fartown Ground, Huddersfield on Saturday 24 March 1973.

Hepworth played scrum-half in Leeds' 36–9 victory over Dewsbury in the 1972 Yorkshire Cup final on Saturday 7 October 1972, and played scrum-half, and was man of the match winning the White Rose Trophy in the 7–2 victory over Wakefield Trinity in the 1973 Yorkshire Cup final on Saturday 20 October 1973.

After losing his first team place to Peter Banner at the start of the 1976–77 season, Hepworth was transfer listed by Leeds, and was eventually sold to Hull FC.

=== Hull FC ===
Hepworth played scrum-half in Hull FC's 13–3 victory over Hull Kingston Rovers in the 1979 BBC2 Floodlit Trophy Final on Tuesday 18 December 1979.

=== Representative honours ===
Hepworth won caps for Yorkshire playing Scrum-half in the 33–10 victory over Lancashire at Hull FC's stadium on 23 September 1964, the 3–19 defeat by Cumberland at Hull Kingston Rovers' stadium on 8 September 1965, the 15–9 victory over New Zealand at Castleford's stadium on 20 September 1965, the 34–23 victory over Cumberland at Castleford's stadium on 25 October 1967, the 12–14 defeat by Lancashire at Salford's stadium on 3 September 1969, and the 34–8 victory over Lancashire at Castleford's stadium on 24 February 1971.

Hepworth represented Commonwealth XIII while at Castleford in 1965 against New Zealand at Crystal Palace National Recreation Centre, London on Wednesday 18 August 1965, and won caps for Great Britain while at Castleford in 1967 against France (2 matches); in 1970 against Australia (3 matches), and New Zealand (2 matches), and in the 1970 Rugby League World Cup against Australia, France, New Zealand, and Australia.

== Coaching career ==
Hepworth coached Bramley between 1980 and 1982, and occasionally made appearances as a player for the club. At the end of the 1981–82 season, his contract was not renewed and the club appointed Maurice Bamford as his replacement.

In 1988 Hepworth was joint team manager of Hull FC with Tony Dean (former coach of Wakefield Trinity).

== Death ==
On 14 November 2024, it was announced that Hepworth had died at the age of 82.
