= Barry Seabourne =

Former Great Britain and England international rugby league footballer

Personal information
- Full name: Barry Seabourne
- Born: 16 February 1947 (age 78) Leeds district, England

Playing information
- Position: Scrum-half
Club
Years	Team	Pld	T	G	FG	P
1963–72	Leeds	174	25	37	36	221
1972–77	Bradford Northern	170	20	56	20	192
	Total	344	45	93	56	413
Representative
Years	Team	Pld	T	G	FG	P
1968	Yorkshire	3	1	0	0	3
1970	England	2	0	0	0	0
1970	Great Britain	1	0	0	0	0

Coaching information
Club
Years	Team	Gms	W	D	L	W%
1977–79	Keighley
1985–89	Bradford Northern
1990–91	Huddersfield
	Total	0	0	0	0

Barry Seabourne (born 16 February 1947) is an English former professional rugby league footballer who played in the 1960s and 1970s, and coached in the 1980s and 1990s. He played at representative level for Great Britain and England, and at club level for Leeds (captain), and Bradford Northern, as a scrum-half. and coached at club level for Bradford Northern and Huddersfield.

== Background ==
Seabourne' s birth was registered in Leeds, West Riding of Yorkshire, England.

== Playing career ==
=== Leeds ===
Seabourne debuted for Leeds against Hull Kingston Rovers on 24 May 1963, aged 16 years and 97 days, making him the club's youngest ever debutant.

Seabourne played scrum-half in Leeds' 2–18 defeat by Wakefield Trinity in the 1964 Yorkshire Cup Final during the 1964–65 season at Fartown Ground, Huddersfield on Saturday 31 October 1964, and played scrum-half, and was man of the match winning the White Rose Trophy in the 22–11 victory over Castleford in the 1968 Yorkshire Cup Final during the 1968–69 season at Belle Vue, Wakefield on Saturday 19 October 1968.

Seabourne played scrum-half in Leeds' 11–10 victory over Wakefield Trinity in the 1968 Challenge Cup "Watersplash" Final during the 1967-68 season at Wembley Stadium, London on Saturday 11 May 1968, played scrum-half in the 7–21 defeat by Leigh in the 1971 Challenge Cup Final during the 1970–71 season at Wembley Stadium, London on Saturday 15 May 1971, in front of a crowd of 85,514.

In 2023, he was inducted into the club's Hall of Fame.

=== Bradford Northern ===
In January 1972, Seabourne transferred to Bradford Northern for a fee of £3,000.

Seabourne played scrum-half in Bradford Northern's 14–33 defeat by Featherstone Rovers in the 1973 Challenge Cup Final during the 1972–73 season at Wembley Stadium, London on Saturday 12 May 1973, in front of a crowd of 72,395.

Seabourne played scrum-half, and was man of the match in Bradford Northern's 3–2 victory over Widnes in the 1974–75 Player's No.6 Trophy Final during the 1974–75 season at Wilderspool Stadium, Warrington on Saturday 25 January 1975.

=== International honours ===
Seabourne won caps for England while at Leeds in 1970 against Wales, and France, and won a cap for Great Britain while at Leeds in 1970 against New Zealand.

== Coaching career ==
Seabourne was the coach in Bradford Northern's 11–2 victory over Castleford in the 1987 Yorkshire Cup Final during the 1987–88 season at Elland Road, Leeds on Saturday 31 October 1987. He resigned shortly before the start of the 1989–90 season.
