= Johnny Ward (rugby league) =

GB & England international rugby league footballer (died 2019)

John Ward
Personal information
- Full name: John Ward
- Born: 1940 or 1941 Castleford, West Yorkshire, England
- Died: 30 December 2019 (aged 78) Glasshoughton, England

Playing information
- Height: 5 ft 9 in (1.75 m)
- Weight: 13 st 7 lb (86 kg)
- Position: Prop, Hooker
Club
Years	Team	Pld	T	G	FG	P
1960–70	Castleford	262	42	0	3	132
1970–73	Salford	81
	Total	343	42	0	3	132
Representative
Years	Team	Pld	T	G	FG	P
1965–69	Yorkshire	4	0	0	0	0
1969–70	England	3	0	0	0	0
1963–70	Great Britain	4	1	0	0	3

Johnny Ward (1940/1941 – 30 December 2019) was an English professional rugby league footballer who played in the 1950s, 1960s and 1970s. He played at representative level for Great Britain, England and Yorkshire, and at club level Castleford and Salford, as a prop or hooker.

== Career ==
Ward was born in Castleford, West Yorkshire and signed for Featherstone Rovers in 1959. He failed to make any appearance for Featherstone and signed for his home town team, Castleford, the following year. After spending 10 years with Castleford he moved to Salford in 1970 for whom he played until he retired at the end of the 1972/73 season.

=== Castleford ===
Ward played in Castleford's Yorkshire League victory during the 1964–65 season.

Ward played at prop in Castleford's 11–22 defeat by Leeds in the 1968 Yorkshire Cup Final at Belle Vue, Wakefield, on 19 October 1968.

Ward played hooker in Castleford's 4–0 victory over St. Helens in the 1965 BBC2 Floodlit Trophy Final at Knowsley Road, St. Helens on 14 December 1965, and played hooker in the 8–5 victory over Leigh in the 1967 BBC2 Floodlit Trophy Final at Headingley, Leeds, on Saturday 16 January 1968.

Ward played at prop in Castleford's 11–6 victory over Salford in the 1969 Challenge Cup Final during the 1968–69 season at Wembley Stadium, London on Saturday 17 May 1969, in front of a crowd of 97,939.

=== Salford ===
Ward played at prop in Salford's 25–11 victory over Swinton in the 1972 Lancashire Cup Final at Wilderspool Stadium, Warrington on 21 October 1972. He also played at prop in Salford's 7–12 defeat by Leeds in the Player's No.6 Trophy Final at Fartown, Huddersfield, on 24 March 1973.

=== Representative honours ===
Ward won caps for England while at Castleford in 1969 against Wales and France, while at Salford in 1970 against France, and won caps for Great Britain while at Castleford in 1963 against Australia, in 1964 against France (two matches), and while at Salford in 1970 against New Zealand.

Ward won caps for Yorkshire while at Castleford playing hooker in the 15–9 victory over New Zealand at Castleford's stadium on 20 September 1965, playing hooker in the 16–13 victory over Lancashire at Swinton's stadium on 10 November 1965, playing at prop in the 10–5 victory over Lancashire at Hull Kingston Rovers' stadium on 25 September 1968, and played at prop in the 42–3 victory over Cumberland at Hull Kingston Rovers' stadium on 1 October 1969.

== Honoured at Castleford Tigers ==
Ward is a Tigers Hall of Fame inductee.
