= 1968–69 Northern Rugby Football League season =

1968–69 Rugby Football League season
- League: Northern Rugby Football League
- Champions: Leeds
- League Leaders: Leeds
- Top point-scorer(s): Bev Risman 345
- Top try-scorer(s): Bill Francis 40

The 1968–69 Rugby Football League season was the 74th season of rugby league football.

== Season summary ==
Leeds had finished the regular season as League leaders for the third season in a row. They then won their second Championship when they beat Castleford 16-14 in the Championship Final. Bev Risman was awarded the Harry Sunderland Trophy as man-of-the-match.

The Challenge Cup winners were Castleford who beat Salford 11-6 in the final.

St. Helens won the Lancashire League, and Leeds won the Yorkshire League.

== Championship ==
	Team	Pld	W	D	L	Pts
1	Leeds	34	29	2	3	60
2	St. Helens	34	27	2	5	56
3	Wigan	34	25	2	7	52
4	Castleford	34	24	2	8	50
5	Swinton	34	23	0	11	46
6	Salford	34	19	5	10	43
7	Featherstone Rovers	34	21	1	12	43
8	Workington Town	34	21	0	13	42
9	Leigh	34	19	4	11	42
10	Hull Kingston Rovers	34	20	0	14	40
11	York	34	20	0	14	40
12	Wakefield Trinity	34	19	1	14	39
13	Hull	34	18	3	13	39
14	Widnes	34	19	1	14	39
15	Keighley	34	18	1	15	37
16	Oldham	34	18	0	16	36
17	Warrington	34	17	1	16	35
18	Halifax	34	16	2	16	34
19	Bradford Northern	34	16	0	18	32
20	Barrow	34	13	1	20	27
21	Rochdale Hornets	34	13	0	21	26
22	Dewsbury	34	12	1	21	25
23	Hunslet	34	11	0	23	22
24	Doncaster	34	11	0	23	22
25	Huddersfield	34	9	1	24	19
26	Batley	34	8	1	25	17
27	Huyton	34	8	0	26	16
28	Bramley	34	7	0	27	14
29	Blackpool Borough	34	7	0	27	14
30	Whitehaven	34	6	1	27	13

Champions	Play-offs

=== Play-offs ===
Round of 16
Leeds	32
Oldham	12
Workington	11
Leigh	9
Wigan	26
Widnes	10
Salford	13
York	7
Swinton	9
Wakefield Trinity	5
Castleford	14
Hull	10
Featherstone Rovers	16
Hull KR	5
St Helens	25
Keighley	7

Quarter-finals
Leeds	18
Workington	10
Wigan	21
Salford	26
Swinton	8
Castleford	50
Featherstone Rovers	4
St Helens	47

Semi-finals
Leeds	22
Salford	12
Castleford	18
St Helens	6

Final
Leeds	16
Castleford	14

==== Final ====
24 May 1969

Leeds	16 – 14	Castleford
Tries: Cowan, Atkinson; Goals: Risman (4), Ramsey		Tries: Hardisty, Dickinson; Goals: Redfearn (3), Hardisty

Odsal Stadium, Bradford
Attendance: 28,442
Referee: Billy Thompson (Huddersfield)
Player of the Match: Bev Risman

Leeds	Number	Castleford
	Teams	
Bev Risman	1	Derek Edwards
Ron Cowan	2	Trevor Briggs
Syd Hynes	3	Keith Howe
Bernard Watson	4	Tony Thomas
John Atkinson	5	Alan Lowndes
Mick Shoebottom	6	Alan Hardisty
Barry Seabourne	7	Keith Hepworth
Mick Clark	8	Dennis Hartley
Tony Crosby	9	Clive Dickinson
Kenny Eyre	10	Johnny Ward
Mick Joyce	11	Mick Redfearn
Bill Ramsey	12	Brian Lockwood
Ray Batten	13	Mal Reilly
	Subs	
John Langley (for Seabourne)	14	Trevor Bedford
David Hick (for Clark)	15	Frank Fox (for Reilly)
Joe Warham	Coach	Derek Turner

== Challenge Cup ==
Castleford beat Salford 11-6 in the final played at Wembley before a crowd of 97,939. Salford were captained by David Watkins.

This was Castleford’s second Cup Final win in two Final appearances.

This is Salford’s most recent appearance in a Challenge Cup Final.

== County cups ==
St. Helens beat Oldham 30–2 to win the Lancashire County Cup, and Leeds beat Castleford 22–11 to win the Yorkshire County Cup.

== BBC2 Floodlit Trophy ==
The BBC2 Floodlit Trophy winners were Wigan who beat St. Helens 7-4 in the final.

== Sources ==
- Saxton, Irvin (ed.). History of Rugby League: No.74 1968–1969. League Publications.
- 1968-69 Rugby Football League season at wigan.rlfans.com
- The Challenge Cup at The Rugby Football League website
