= 1969–70 Northern Rugby Football League season =

- League: Northern Rugby Football League
- Champions: St. Helens
- League Leaders: Leeds
- Top point-scorer(s): Colin Tyrer 385
- Top try-scorer(s): John Atkinson 38

The 1969–70 Northern Rugby Football League season was the 75th season of rugby league football in Britain.

== Rule change ==
- Tactical substitutions were now allowed to occur after half time during a game, they had been permitted before half time since 1964.

== Season summary ==
Leeds had ended the regular season as league leaders for the fourth successive season. St. Helens won their fifth Rugby Football League Championship when they beat Leeds 24-12 in the final. Frank Myler was awarded the Harry Sunderland Trophy as man-of-the-match.

The Challenge Cup winners were Castleford who beat Wigan 7-2 in the final.

Wigan won the Lancashire League, and Leeds won the Yorkshire League. This was the last season in which the Lancashire League and Yorkshire League titles were awarded, as the competitions were abolished following a vote on fixture reform during the season.

== Championship ==
	Team	Pld	W	D	L	Pts
1	Leeds	34	30	0	4	60
2	Castleford	34	25	1	8	51
3	St. Helens	34	23	1	10	47
4	Wigan	34	23	0	11	46
5	Hull Kingston Rovers	34	22	2	10	46
6	Salford	34	22	1	11	45
7	Leigh	34	21	3	10	45
8	Featherstone Rovers	34	22	1	11	45
9	Swinton	34	20	4	10	44
10	Widnes	34	21	2	11	44
11	Hull	34	20	2	12	42
12	Bradford Northern	34	19	0	15	38
13	Whitehaven	34	18	2	14	38
14	Warrington	34	17	2	15	36
15	Huddersfield	34	17	1	16	35
16	Halifax	34	16	0	18	32
17	Batley	34	15	1	18	31
18	Bramley	34	14	1	19	29
19	Barrow	34	14	1	19	29
20	Rochdale Hornets	34	13	3	18	29
21	Wakefield Trinity	34	13	2	19	28
22	Dewsbury	34	13	1	20	27
23	Hunslet	34	13	1	20	27
24	Workington Town	34	12	2	20	26
25	Keighley	34	13	0	21	26
26	York	34	11	1	22	23
27	Doncaster	34	7	0	27	14
28	Huyton	34	5	3	26	13
29	Oldham	34	6	0	28	12
30	Blackpool Borough	34	6	0	28	12

Champions	Play-offs

=== Play-offs ===
Round of 16
Leeds	26
Halifax	4
Wigan	20	4
Whitehaven	20	9
Hull KR	26
Bradford Northern	13
Salford	11
Hull	4
Featherstone Rovers	24
Swinton	18
Castleford	17
Huddersfield	7
St Helens	36
Warrington	8
Leigh	21
Widnes	10

Quarter-finals
Leeds	45
Whitehaven	10
Hull KR	27
Salford	16
Featherstone Rovers	3
Castleford	15
St Helens	16
Leigh	5

Semi-finals
Leeds	47
Hull KR	5
Castleford	9	12
St Helens	9	21

Final
Leeds	12
St Helens	24

==== Final ====
16 May 1970

St Helens	24 – 12	Leeds
Tries: Prescott (2), Walsh, Sayer; Goals: Coslett (4), Walsh (2)		Tries: Smith, Cowan; Goals: Holmes (3)

Odsal Stadium, Bradford
Attendance: 26,358
Referee: Billy Thompson (Huddersfield)
Player of the Match: Frank Myler

St Helens	Number	Leeds
	Teams	
Frank Barrow	1	John Holmes
Les Jones	2	Alan Smith
Billy Benyon	3	Syd Hynes
John Walsh	4	Ron Cowan
Eric Prescott	5	John Atkinson
Frank Myler	6	Mick Shoebottom
Jeff Heaton	7	Barry Seabourne (c)
Albert Halsall	8	John Burke
Bill Sayer	9	Tony Crosby
Cliff Watson (c)	10	Albert Eyre
John Mantle	11	Graham Eccles
Eric Chisnall	12	Bill Ramsey
Kel Coslett	13	Ray Batten
	Subs	
Alan Whittle	14	John Langley
Graham Rees	15	David Hick (for Ramsey)
Cliff Evans	Coach	Derek Turner

== Challenge Cup ==
Castleford beat Wigan 7-2 in the final played at Wembley in front of a crowd of 95,255.

This was Castleford’s third Cup Final win in three Final appearances and their second in successive years. It was also the lowest winning score in a Challenge Cup Final at Wembley.

== County cups ==
Swinton beat Leigh 11–2 to win the Lancashire County Cup, and Hull F.C. beat Featherstone Rovers 12–9 to win the Yorkshire County Cup.

== BBC2 Floodlit Trophy ==
The BBC2 Floodlit Trophy winners were Leigh who beat Wigan 11-6 in the final.

== Sources ==
- Saxton, Irvin (ed.). History of Rugby League: No.75 1969–1970. League Publications.
- 1969-70 Rugby Football League season at wigan.rlfans.com
- The Challenge Cup at The Rugby Football League website
