= 1968 Rugby League World Cup squads =

The 1968 Rugby League World Cup featured 4 international teams, each consisting of a 19-man squad.

== Australia ==
Coach: Harry Bath
Tour manager: A. M. Kingston

Player	Games	Points	Club
Arthur Beetson	3	0	Balmain
Tony Branson	2	0	St. George
Ron Coote	4	12	South Sydney
Brian Fitzsimmons	1	0	Cairns
Bob Fulton	3	6	Manly Warringah
Johnny Greaves	4	6	Canterbury-Bankstown
Brian James	1	0	South Sydney
Fred Jones	3	3	Manly Warringah
Johnny King	2	6	St. George
Graeme Langlands	3	0	St. George
Dennis Manteit	1	0	Brisbane
Johnny Raper (c)	4	3	St. George
Elton Rasmussen	2	0	St. George
Johnny Rhodes	4	3	Canterbury-Bankstown
Eric Simms	4	50	South Sydney
Billy Smith	4	12	St. George
Dick Thornett	3	0	Parramatta
Lionel Williamson	2	12	Innisfail
John Wittenberg	4	0	St. George

== France ==
Coach: Jep Lacoste

Player	Games	Points	Club
Georges Aillères (c)	3	0	Toulouse
Adolphe Alésina	2	0	Carcassonne
Yves Bégou	4	0	Toulouse
Jean Capdouze	4	19	Perpignan
Jean-Pierre Clar	4	0	Villeneuve
Jean-Claude Cros	4	0	Albi
Francis de Nadaï	3	0	Limoux
André Ferren	2	0	Avignon
Marius Frattini	1	0	Cavaillon
Roger Garrigue	2	6	Saint-Gaudens
Jacques Gruppi	2	0	Villeneuve
Jean-Pierre Lecompte	3	0	Saint-Gaudens
Jean-René Ledru	3	3	Avignon
Henri Marracq	3	0	Saint-Gaudens
Hervé Mazard	2	0	Lézignan
Michel Molinier	3	0	Albi
Daniel Pellerin	3	0	Villeneuve
Christian Sabatié	4	0	Villeneuve
Victor Serrano	1	0	Saint-Gaudens

Bernard Quatrevault (Bordeaux) was originally named in the squad, but was replaced by Jean-René Ledru due to injury. Jean-Claude Lauga (Villeneuve) and Pierre Garaig (Marseille) were substitutes in the touring squad.

== Great Britain ==
Coach: Colin Hutton
Tour manager: Bill Fallowfield

Nat.	Player	Games	Points	Club
(England)	Kevin Ashcroft	1	0	Leigh
(England)	John Atkinson	2	0	Leeds
(England)	Tommy Bishop	3	0	St Helens
(England)	Ian Brooke	3	6	Wakefield Trinity
(England)	Alan Burwell	3	6	Hull KR
(England)	Mick Clark	3	0	Leeds
(England)	Derek Edwards	0	0	Castleford
(England)	Peter Flanagan	2	0	Hull KR
(England)	Ray French	2	0	Widnes
(England)	Bob Haigh	2	0	Wakefield Trinity
(England)	Roger Millward	3	0	Hull KR
(England)	Arnie Morgan	2	3	Featherstone
(Scotland)	Charlie Renilson	3	0	Halifax
(England)	Bev Risman (c)	3	20	Leeds
(England)	Mick Shoebottom	2	3	Leeds
(Wales)	Clive Sullivan	3	12	Hull F.C.
(Wales)	John Warlow	2	0	St Helens
(England)	Cliff Watson	3	0	St Helens
(England)	Chris Young	0	0	Hull KR

== New Zealand ==
Coach: Des Barchard
Tour manager: Doug Wilson

Player	Position	Age	Club	Games	Points
Jim Bond (c)	Stand-off	31	Canterbury	2	0
Eric Carson	Scrum-half	28	Auckland	1	0
Gary Clarke	Scrum-half	25	Canterbury	2	0
Oscar Danielson	Prop	23	Auckland	1	0
Kevin Dixon	Second-row	25	West Coast	2	0
Spencer Dunn	Wing	24	Canterbury	2	3
Doug Ellwood	Stand-off	27	Auckland	2	0
Tony Kriletich	Loose forward	24	Auckland	3	0
Brian Lee	Second-row	27	Auckland	3	0
Colin McMaster	Prop	28	West Coast	1	0
Robert Mincham	Wing	27	Auckland	3	0
Colin O'Neil	Hooker	26	Wellington	3	0
Don Parkinson	Hooker	32	Waikato	0	0
Paul Schultz	Centre	28	Auckland	3	9
Ray Sinel	Centre	26	Auckland	2	0
Garry Smith	Prop	27	Wellington	3	0
Roger Tait (vc)	Fullback	30	Auckland	3	0
Henry Tatana	Prop	23	Auckland	2	0
Ernie Wiggs	Wing	26	Auckland	3	24

Both Leo Brown and Bill Johnsen they were unavailable for the team. Former All Black Vic Yates missed selection to the surprise of reporters.
