= 1968 Rugby League World Cup final =

Australia	France
(ARL)	(FFR XIII)
20	2
	1	2	Total
AUS	7	12	20
FRA	0	2	2
- Date: 10 June 1968
- Stadium: Sydney Cricket Ground
- Location: Sydney, Australia
- Man of the Match: John Wittenberg (Australia)
- Referee: John Percival (New Zealand)
- Attendance: 54,290

Broadcast partners

The 1968 Rugby League World Cup final was the conclusive game of the 1968 Rugby League World Cup tournament and was played between Australia and France on 10 June 1968 at the Sydney Cricket Ground in Australia.

The final had been billed a 'debacle' following Great Britain's inexplicable loss to France in Auckland, leaving them to contest the final despite being beaten by Australia seven tries to nil two days prior. Nonetheless, it attracted a then record crowd of 54,290 for a World Cup final, though it wasn't the record World Cup attendance as the second match of the tournament between Australia and Great Britain (won 25-10 by Australia) had drawn 62,256 to the SCG, a record that would not fall until 73,631 attended the 1992 World Cup final at Wembley Stadium.

== Background ==
The 1968 Rugby League World Cup was the fourth staging of the Rugby League World Cup since its inauguration in 1954, and the first since the 1960 tournament. The tournament was held in the Australia and New Zealand from 25 May, culminating in the final between Australia and France on 10 June.

=== Australia ===
Scores and results list Australia's points tally first.

Opposing Team	For	Against	Date	Venue	Attendance	Stage
Great Britain	25	10	25 May	Sydney Cricket Ground, Sydney	62,256	Group Stage
New Zealand	31	12	1 June	Lang Park, Brisbane	23,608	Group Stage
France	37	4	8 June	Lang Park, Brisbane	32,664	Group Stage

Australia were undefeated going into the final.

=== France ===
Scores and results list France's points tally first.

Opposing Team	For	Against	Date	Venue	Attendance	Stage
New Zealand	15	10	25 May	Carlaw Park, Auckland	18,000	Group Stage
Great Britain	7	2	2 June	Carlaw Park, Auckland	15,760	Group Stage
Australia	4	37	8 June	Lang Park, Brisbane	32,664	Group Stage

France had a 2–1 record going into the Final

== Match details ==
Although it had been anticipated before the tournament that it would be an Australia vs Great Britain WCF, the French surprised by making the Final after defeating both New Zealand and Great Britain in the preliminary games. The match attracted a World Cup final record crowd of 54,290.

10 June 1968

Australia	20–2	France
Try: Lionel Williamson (2); Ron Coote; Johnny Greaves; Goals: Eric Simms (4)		Try: Goals: Field Goals: Jean Capdouze (1)

Sydney Cricket Ground, Sydney
Attendance: 54,290
Referee: John Percival (New Zealand)
Player of the Match: John Wittenberg (Australia)

Australia	France

FB	1	Eric Simms
LW	2	Johnny Rhodes
RC	3	Graeme Langlands
LC	4	Johnny Greaves
RW	5	Lionel Williamson
FE	6	Bob Fulton
HB	7	Billy Smith
LK	8	Johnny Raper (c)
SR	9	Ron Coote
SR	10	Dick Thornett
PR	11	Arthur Beetson
HK	12	Fred Jones
PR	13	John Wittenberg
Substitutions:
IC	15	Elton Rasmussen
Coach:
Harry Bath

FB	1	Jean-Claude Cros
RW	2	Daniel Pellerin
RC	3	Jacques Gruppi
LC	4	Jean-Pierre Lecompte
LW	19	Jean-René Ledru
FE	6	Jean Capdouze
HB	7	Roger Garrigue
PR	8	Christian Sabatié
HK	9	Yves Bégou
PR	10	George Ailleres (c)
SR	11	Francis de Nadai
SR	12	Henri Marracq
LF	13	Jean-Pierre Clar
Substitutions:
IC	16	Jacques Gruppi
Coach:
Jep Lacoste

The undefeated Australians went into the tournament decider as favourites. However, France offered stern resistance and held the Australians to only a 7–0 lead at half-time, and with quarter of an hour left were only 12–0 down before losing 20–2. It was Australia's second World Cup title.

== See also ==
- Rugby League World Cup
- Australia national rugby league team
- France national rugby league team
- List of rugby league test matches at the Sydney Cricket Ground
