= 1970 Rugby League World Cup squads =

This is a list of the squads which took part at the 1970 Rugby League World Cup.

== Australia ==
Coach: Harry Bath

1. Eric Simms
2. Lionel Williamson
3. John Cootes
4. Paul Sait
5. Mark Harris
6. Bob Fulton
7. Billy Smith
8. John O'Neill
9. Ron Turner
10. Bob O'Reilly
11. Bob McCarthy
12. Ron Costello
13. Ron Coote (c)
14. Ray Branighan
15. Elwyn Walters

== France ==
Coach: Jep Lacoste

1. Jean-Pierre Clar (c), lock for Villeneuve
2. Roger Biffi, second row for Saint-Gaudens
3. Élie Bonal, wing for Carcassonne
4. Floréal Bonet, front row for Albi
5. Jacques Cabero, hooker for Catalan
6. Jean Capdouze, five-eight for Catalan
7. Roger Coquand, prop for Carcassonne
8. Gérard Crémoux, second row for Villeneuve
9. Jean-Claude Cros. fullback for Albi
10. Francis de Nadaï, second row for Limoux
11. Raymond Gruppi, wing for Villeneuve
12. Roger Garrigue, halfback for Toulouse
13. Germain Guiraud, halfback for Carcassonne
14. Serge Marsolan, wing for Saint-Gaudens
15. Hervé Mazard, second row for Lézignan
16. Michel Molinier, centre for Saint-Gaudens
17. Daniel Pellerin, wing for Villeneuve
18. André Ruiz, centre for Carcassonne
19. Christian Sabatié, prop for Villeneuve

== Great Britain ==
Coach: Johnny Whiteley

1. Frank Myler (c)
2. Kevin Ashcroft
3. John Atkinson
4. Paul Charlton
5. David Chisnall
6. Ray Dutton
7. Tony Fisher
8. Bob Haigh
9. Dennis Hartley
10. Keith Hepworth
11. Chris Hesketh
12. Syd Hynes
13. Keri Jones
14. Doug Laughton
15. Mal Reilly
16. Mick Shoebottom
17. Alan Smith
18. Jimmy Thompson
19. Cliff Watson

== New Zealand ==
Coach:Lory Blanchard

Player	Position	Age	Club	Games	Points
Mocky Brereton	Wing	23	Canterbury	3	3
Roy Christian	Centre	27	Auckland	3	3
Graeme Cooksley	Scrum-half	21	Canterbury	3	3
Bill Deacon	Second-row	26	Waikato	2	0
Doug Gailey	Prop	22	Auckland	2	0
Lummy Graham	Fullback	24	Auckland	2	0
John Greengrass	Prop	23	Canterbury	2	0
Eddie Heatley	Loose forward	22	Auckland	2	0
Elliot Kereopa	Second-row	26	Midlands	2	0
Tony Kriletich	Loose forward	26	Auckland	3	3
Don Ladner	Fullback	22	West Coast	3	26
Bernie Lowther	Centre	20	Auckland	3	0
Bob McGuinn	Wing	22	Auckland	1	0
Colin O'Neil	Hooker	28	Wellington	3	0
Garry Smith	Prop	29	Wellington	3	6
John Whittaker	Wing	20	Wellington	2	0
Gary Woollard	Stand-off	28	Wellington	3	0
