= Hervé Mazard =

France international rugby league & union player

Personal information
- Born: 18 December 1943 (age 82) Montbrun-des-Corbières, France

Playing information
- Position: Second-row
Club
Years	Team	Pld	T	G	FG	P
1963–64	FC Lézignan
1963–64	RC Marseille
1964–72	FC Lézignan
1972–75	Limoux XIII
1975–79	Saint-Jacques-de-Carcassonne XIII
	Total	0	0	0	0	0
Representative
Years	Team	Pld	T	G	FG	P
1966–71	France	11	3	0	0	3
- Source: As of 31 October 2017

Hervé Mazard (born in Montbrun-des-Corbières, on 18 December 1943) is a French former professional rugby league footballer who played in the 1960s and 1970s. He was nicknamed Le Concorde. He played representative level rugby league (RL) for France in the 1968 Rugby League World Cup and 1970 Rugby League World Cup, and at club level for FC Lézignan XIII, RC Marseille and Limoux XIII.

== Background ==
Hailing from the Corbières, Hervé Mazard was part of the junior sections of the Lézignan club. Except for a military period during the start of his career for RC Marseille, Mazard played for Lézignan for nine years, winning the Coupe de France in 1966 and 1970, playing alongside his brother Patrick Mazard, Georges Aillères, Michel Maïque, Gilbert Benausse and Pierre Lacaze. In 1972, he joined Limoux XIII, where he also played Hervé Guiraud and Louis Bonnéry before ending his career at Saint-Jacques-de-Carcassonne XIII.

== International career ==
His club performances brought him to be called up for France between 1966 and 1971 in the second-row position. He took an active part alongside Jean Capdouze and Georges Aillères during the team's road to the final in 1968, lost against Australia. Also with the France jersey, he won against Great Britain and Wales.

=== 1968 Rugby League World Cup ===
In the French team coached by Jep Lacoste, Mazard was integrated by the manager Antoine Jimenez in the role of second row, alongside Adolphe Alésina, Francis de Nadai and Henri Marracq, being the only Lézignan player in the squad.

Mazard did not took part at the opening match against New Zealand at the Carlaw Park on 25 May 1968, as De Nadai and Marracq were the first choice second-rows preferred to him. The New Zealand team loses their player Brian Lee at the 12th minute after hitting André Ferren with a forearm uppercut, and the Kiwis had to play in numeric inferiority during the match.

== Honours ==
=== Club ===
- Winner of the Lord Derby Cup in 1966 and 1970 (Lèzignan)
- Runner-up at the Lord Derby Cup in 1971 (Lézignan)

=== International ===
- 1968 Rugby League World Cup - Runner up
