= List of Rugby League World Cup opening matches =

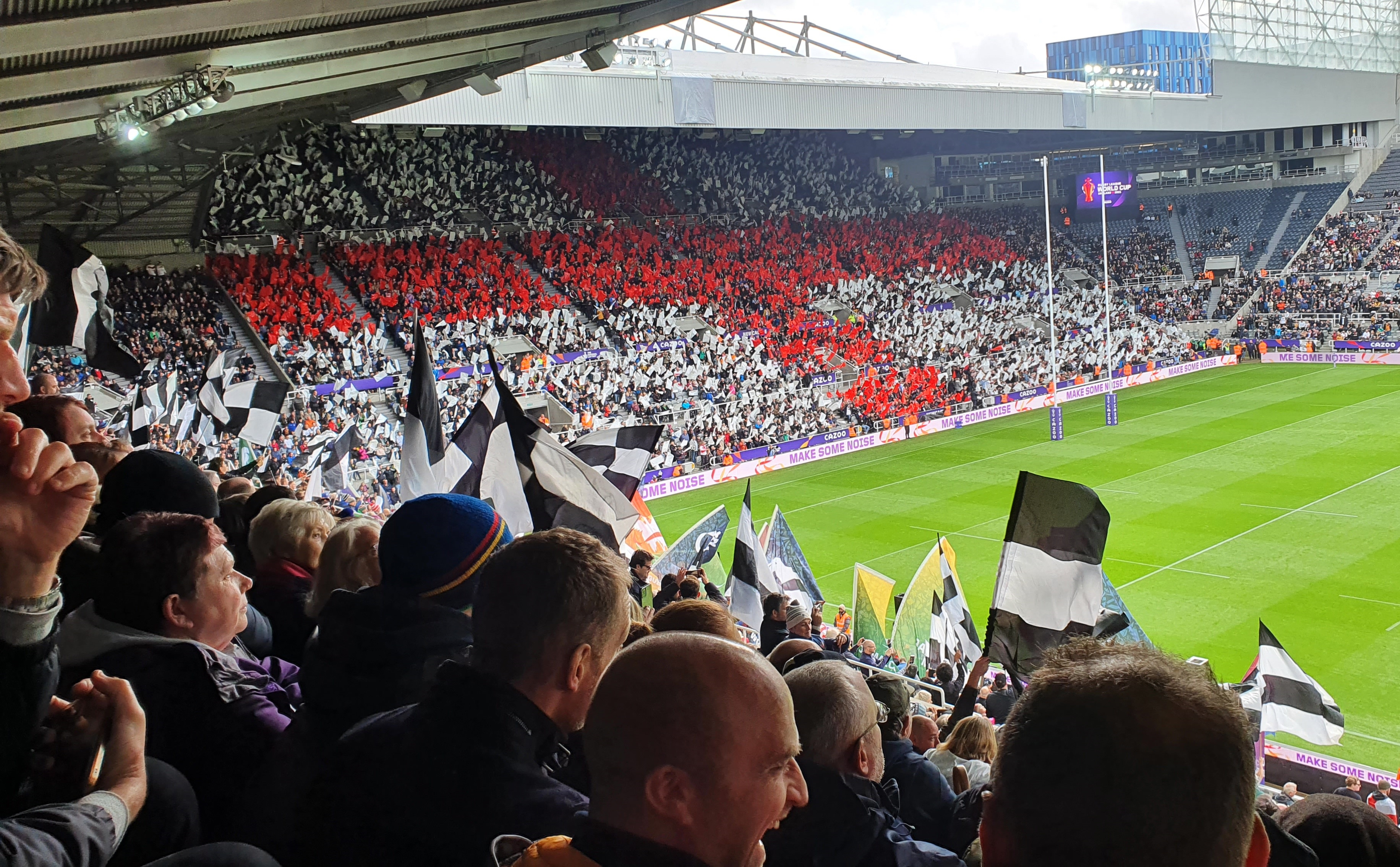
England fans ahead of the opening game of the 2021 World Cup at St James' Park

The Rugby League World Cup is an international rugby league competition established in 1954. The tournament has taken place fifteen times in irregular intervals, however the tournament is currently happening every four years.

The opening match is the first match of the tournament and usually it has a ceremony to go with it. Often, it features the host nation.

== List of opening matches ==
Bold denotes host nation.

| Year | Winning Team | Final score | Losing Team | Venue | Location | Attendance | References | Notes |
|---|---|---|---|---|---|---|---|---|
| 1954 | **France** | 22–13 | New Zealand | Parc des Princes | Paris, France | 13,240 | Report | |
| 1957 | Great Britain | 23–5 | France | Sydney Cricket Ground | Sydney, Australia | 50,077 | Report | |
| 1960 | **Great Britain** | 23–8 | New Zealand | Odsal Stadium | Bradford, England | 20,577 | Report | (Note: Two matches were played at the same time on the opening day.) |
| 1960 | Australia | 13–12 | France | Central Park | Wigan, England | 20,278 | Report | (Note: Two matches were played at the same time on the opening day.) |
| 1968 | **Australia** | 25–10 | Great Britain | Sydney Cricket Ground | Sydney, Australia | 62,256 | Report | |
| 1970 | Australia | 47–11 | New Zealand | Central Park | Wigan, England | 9,805 | Report | |
| 1972 | **France** | 15–10 | New Zealand | Stade Vélodrome | Marseille, France | 20,748 | Report | |
| 1975 | **France** | 14–7 | Wales | Stadium de Toulouse | Toulouse, France | 7,563 | Report | |
| 1977 | Australia | 27–12 | **New Zealand** | Carlaw Park | Auckland, New Zealand | 18,000 | Report | |
| 1985–1988 | **New Zealand** | 18–0 | Australia | Carlaw Park | Auckland, New Zealand | 15,327 | Report | |
| 1989–1992 | Australia | 22–14 | **New Zealand** | Mount Smart Stadium | Auckland, New Zealand | 15,000 | Report | |
| 1995 | **England** | 20–16 | Australia | Wembley Stadium | London, England | 41,271 | Report | |
| 2000 | Australia | 22–2 | **England** | Twickenham Stadium | London, England | 33,758 | Report | |
| 2008 | England | 32–22 | Papua New Guinea | Willows Sports Complex | Townsville, Australia | 10,780 | Report | (Note: The opening ceremony was held the following day before a double header, with the matches being Indigenous Dreamtime 34–26 New Zealand Maori (not a tournament match) and Australia 30–6 New Zealand at the Sydney Football Stadium.) |
| 2013 | Italy | 32–16 | **Wales** | Millennium Stadium | Cardiff, Wales | 45,052 | Report | (Note: This was the first match in a double header with Australia 28–20 England being the other match.) |
| 2017 | **Australia** | 18–4 | England | Melbourne Rectangular Stadium | Melbourne, Australia | 22,724 | Report | |
| 2021 | **England** | 60–6 | Samoa | St James' Park | Newcastle upon Tyne, England | 43,199 | Report | |
| 2026 | **Australia** | 24–22 | New Zealand | Sydney Football Stadium | Sydney, Australia | 41,255 | Report | |
