= Finley Rasmussen =

New Zealand rugby league footballer and coach

Findlay Rasmussen
Personal information
- Born: 13 October 1943 (age 81); Cook Islands

Playing information
- Position: Scrum-half
Club
Years	Team	Pld	T	G	FG	P
1963–79	Randwick
Representative
Years	Team	Pld	T	G	FG	P
1963–75	Wellington	68

Coaching information
Club
Years	Team	Gms	W	D	L	W%
1982–85	Randwick

Findlay Rasmussen is a New Zealand rugby league player who was named in Wellington Rugby League's team of the century in 2012.

== Playing career ==
Rasmussen played for the Randwick Kingfishers club in the Wellington Rugby League, making his senior debut in 1963. That same year he made his debut for Wellington.

A goalkicker, Rasmussen won Wellington's Stacey Shield for most points in a season three consecutive times, in 1969, 1970 and 1971.

He retired from representative football in 1975 after 68 matches for Wellington, only the second player to reach 50 matches after Colin O'Neil. He retired as a player in 1979, having won premierships with Randwick in 1969, 1969, 1970 and 1976. His seventeen seasons for Randwick is a Wellington club record that still stands.

== Coaching career ==
Rasmussen coached Randwick between 1982 and 1985. The club won the Wellington premiership in 1983, 1984 and 1985 and made all four National club grand finals during his time in charge.

== Personal life ==
Of Cook Islands descent, Rasmussen played rugby league alongside his four brothers. All five played for Randwick and three of them, including Rasmussen, played for Wellington.
