= Michel Molinier =

France international rugby league footballer

Personal information
- Born: 28 May 1947 (age 77)
- Height: 5 ft 9 in (1.75 m)
- Weight: 12 st 5 lb (78 kg)

Playing information
- Position: Centre
Club
Years	Team	Pld	T	G	FG	P
196?–6?	Albi
1968–75	Saint-Gaudens
	Total	0	0	0	0	0
Representative
Years	Team	Pld	T	G	FG	P
1968–75	France	24	3			9

Michel Molinier (born 28 May 1947) is a French former rugby league footballer who played in the 1960s and 1970s. He played at representative level for France, and at club level for Albi and Saint-Gaudens, as centre.

== Playing career ==
Molinier played for Albi, and then for Saint-Gaudens at club level and also represented France at international level, playing the 1968, 1970, 1972 and 1975 Rugby League World Cups, earning 24 international caps in his overall career>. Outside the game, he was undertaking National service, When playing for Saint-Gaudens and for France, he formed a devastating centre combination with Serge Marsolan,

== Honours ==
- Rugby league:
- French Championship:
  - 2 time Champion in: 1969, 1973 (Saint-Gaudens)
  - 3 times finalist in 1968, 1970, 1971 (Saint-Gaudens)
