= Jeff Wittenberg =

Australian rugby league footballer (born 1973)

Personal information
- Born: 19 March 1973 (age 53) Brisbane, Queensland, Australia

Playing information
- Position: Prop, Second-row
Club
Years	Team	Pld	T	G	FG	P
1993	St. George Dragons	1	0	0	0	0
1995–96	South Qld Crushers	19	1	0	0	4
1997–98	Bradford Bulls	18	4	0	0	16
1998–99	Huddersfield Giants	20	1	0	0	4
2000	Sheffield Eagles	19	1	0	0	4
2001	Batley Bulldogs	28	4	0	0	16
2002–03	Huddersfield Giants	35	3	0	0	12
	Total	140	14	0	0	56
- Father: John Wittenberg

Jeff Wittenberg (born 19 March 1973) is an Australian former professional rugby league footballer who played in England and Australia. His father John was an Australian international.

== Playing career ==
Wittenberg began his career playing for the Wynnum Manly Seagulls, a club who his father had also represented. In 1993, he signed with the St. George Dragons, another of his father's former clubs. Wittenberg only made one appearance for the club and left at the end of the season.

In 1995, Wittenberg joined the new South Queensland Crushers franchise and played in their inaugural match on 11 March 1995. He spent two seasons at the club. Chosen for his size, at 196 cm he was the biggest man in the Crushers engine room. In 1997, despite interest from Castleford, Wittenberg signed with the Bradford Bulls for 1997's Super League II. He only remained one season with the Bulls, joining the Huddersfield Giants in 1998. At the end of the 1998 season Wittenberg was released.

Wittenberg spent several years in the lower grades, playing for the Sheffield Eagles and then the Batley Bulldogs. Wittenberg then returned to Huddersfield, playing for the club in the 2002 and 2003 seasons.
