= Lummy Graham =

New Zealand international rugby league player

Personal information
- Full name: Ngaroma Romeo Graham
- Born: 23 January 1947 New Zealand
- Died: Deceased

Playing information
- Position: Fullback
Club
Years	Team	Pld	T	G	FG	P
	Manukau
Representative
Years	Team	Pld	T	G	FG	P
	Auckland
1970	New Zealand	3	0	0	0	0

Lummy Graham is a New Zealand former rugby league footballer who represented New Zealand in the 1970 World Cup.

== Playing career ==
Graham played for the Manukau Magpies in the Auckland Rugby League competition and also represented Auckland. In 1970 he was selected for the New Zealand national rugby league team and played three matches from the bench at the 1970 World Cup.
