= Colin McMaster =

New Zealand rugby league footballer

Personal information
- Full name: Colin Lloyd McMaster
- Born: 21 April 1940 (age 85) New Zealand

Playing information
- Position: Prop, Second-row
Representative
Years	Team	Pld	T	G	FG	P
	West Coast
1963	South Island
1968	New Zealand	1	0	0	0	0
- Source: As of 5 May 2025

Colin McMaster is a New Zealand former rugby league footballer who represented New Zealand in the 1968 World Cup.

== Playing career ==
A West Coast representative, McMaster played for the South Island against South Africa in 1963, winning 12–8.

In 1968 he was selected for the New Zealand national rugby league team and played in one match at the World Cup that year.
