= Elliot Kereopa =

New Zealand international rugby league footballer

Personal information
- Born: 12 September 1944 Christchurch, New Zealand
- Died: 4 March 1997 (aged 52) Christchurch, New Zealand

Playing information
- Position: Second-row
Representative
Years	Team	Pld	T	G	FG	P
	Midlands
1970	New Zealand	3	0	0	0	0

Elliot Kereopa is a New Zealand former rugby league footballer who represented New Zealand in the 1970 World Cup.

== Playing career ==
A graduate of Rotorua Boys' High School, Kereopa represented the Midlands region and in 1970 was selected for the New Zealand national rugby league team as part of their squad for the 1970 World Cup. He was the first, and only, Kiwis representative from the Midlands region, which later merged into the Bay of Plenty region. Kereopa played in two matches at the World Cup, against France and Great Britain.
