= Jean-Claude Cros =

France international rugby league footballer (1941–2023)

Personal information
- Born: 10 June 1941; Saint-Benoît-de-Carmaux, Tarn, Occitania, France
- Died: 10 May 2023 (aged 81); Albi, France

Playing information
- Height: 1.75 m (5 ft 9 in)
- Weight: 68 kg (10 st 9 lb)
- Position: Fullback
Club
Years	Team	Pld	T	G	FG	P
19??–??	RC Albi XIII
196?–72	Lézignan Sangliers
	Total	0	0	0	0	0
Representative
Years	Team	Pld	T	G	FG	P
1968–71	France	12	0	0		?
- Source: https://www.rugbyleagueproject.org/players/jean-claude-cros/summary.html

Jean-Claude Cros (Saint-Benoît-de-Carmaux, 10 June 1941 – Albi, 28 May 2023) was a French rugby league player who played as fullback.

== Biography ==
Cros played for Albi and then for Lézignan Sangliers during his career. He also represented France in the 1968 Rugby League World Cup, playing in the last match against Australia. In 1972, Cros had to end his career at the age of 30 years due to an injury to a collarbone before a match against his former club, Albi.

== Honours ==
=== Honours ===
- Rugby league :
- World Cup :
  - Runner-up 1968 (France).

=== Caps ===
==== Cap details ====
Jean-Claude Cros international matches
	Date	Stadium	Opponent	Result	Competition	Position	Points	Tries	Pen.	Drops
Playing for France
.	25 May 1968	Carlaw Park, Auckland, New Zealand	New Zealand	15-10	World Cup	Fullback	-	-	-	-
.	2 June 1968	Lang Park, Brisbane, Australia	Great Britain	7-2	World Cup	Fullback	-	-	-	-
.	8 June 1968	Lang Park, Brisbane, Australia	Australia	4-37	World Cup	Fullback	-	-	-	-
.	10 June 1968	Sydney Cricket Ground, Sydney, Australia	Australia	2-20	World Cup	Fullback	-	-	-	-
.	25 October 1970	Hull, England	New Zealand	15-16	World Cup	Fullback	-	-	-	-
.	28 October 1970	Castleford, England	Great Britain	0-6	World Cup	Fullback	-	-	-	-
.	1 November 1970	Bradford, England	Australia	17-15	World Cup	Fullback	-	-	-	-
