= Roger Biffi =

Former France international rugby league player

- Date of birth: 30 December 1942
- Place of birth: Bellegarde, Gers, France
- Date of death: 1 May 2004 (aged 61)
- Place of death: Toulouse, France

Rugby union career
Senior career
Years	Team	Apps	(Points)
19??-68	Lannemezan		()
- Rugby league career

Playing information
- Position: Second-row
Club
Years	Team	Pld	T	G	FG	P
1968–73	Saint-Gaudens
Representative
Years	Team	Pld	T	G	FG	P
1970–72	France	7				3

Roger Biffi (Bellegarde, 30 December 1942 - Toulouse, 1 May 2004) was a rugby league and rugby union player. He played as second row.

== Career ==
Biffi first started his career playing rugby union for CA Lannemezan until 1968, when he switched codes to play rugby league for Saint-Gaudens, where he played until the end of his career, in 1973. He was also capped 7 times for France, taking part at the 1970 Rugby League World Cup.

== Honours ==
- Rugby league:
- French Championship:
  - 2 time Champion in: 1969, 1973 (Saint-Gaudens)
  - 3 times finalist in 1968, 1970, 1971 (Saint-Gaudens)
