= Alan Burwell =

GB international rugby league footballer

Personal information
- Born: December 15, 1942 (age 83) Kingston upon Hull, England

Playing information
- Position: Wing, Centre, Stand-off, Scrum-half
Club
Years	Team	Pld	T	G	FG	P
1961–76	Hull Kingston Rovers	226	106	2	0	322
1970–72	Canterbury-Bankstown	48	9	0	0	27
	Total	274	115	2	0	349
Representative
Years	Team	Pld	T	G	FG	P
1966	Great Britain U-24	1	0	0	0	0
1968–69	Yorkshire	4	1	0	0	3
1967–69	Great Britain	8	6	0	0	18

Alan Burwell (born December 1942) is an English former professional rugby league footballer who played in the 1960s and 1970s. He played at representative level for Great Britain, Great Britain (Under-24s) and Yorkshire, and at club level for Hull Kingston Rovers and Canterbury-Bankstown (captain), as a wing, centre, stand-off or scrum-half.

== Background ==
Alan Burwell's birth was registered in Hull district, East Riding of Yorkshire, England, he worked as a chemist at Reckitt and Colman, Dansom Lane South, Kingston upon Hull.

== Playing career ==
=== International honours ===
Alan Burwell won a cap(s) for Great Britain Under-24s against France Under-24s at Stade Jean Dauger, Bayonne, France during 1966, and appeared as a substitute in Great Britain's 3–11 defeat by Australia 1967–68 Kangaroo tour of Great Britain and France match at Station Road, Swinton, England on 9 December 1967, he played as a wing and scored a try in the 22–13 victory over France at Parc des Princes, Paris, France on 11 February 1968, he played as a wing and scored 2-tries in the 19–8 victory over France at Odsal Stadium, Bradford, England on 2 March 1968, he played as a centre in the 10–25 defeat by Australia in the 1968 Rugby League World Cup match at Sydney Cricket Ground, Sydney, Australia on 25 May 1968, he played as a centre in the 2–7 defeat by France in the 1968 Rugby League World Cup match at Carlaw Park, Auckland, New Zealand on 2 June 1968, he played as a centre and scored 2-tries in the 38–14 victory over New Zealand in the 1968 Rugby League World Cup match at Sydney Cricket Ground, Sydney, Australia on 8 June 1968, he played as a wing and scored a try in the 34–10 victory over France at Knowsley Road, St. Helens, England on 30 November 1968 and played as a wing in the 9–13 defeat by France at Stadium de Toulouse, Toulouse, France on 2 February 1969.

=== County honours ===
Alan Burwell won a cap(s) for Yorkshire while at Hull Kingston Rovers.

=== Eastern Division Championship Final appearances ===
Alan Burwell played stand-off in Hull Kingston Rovers' 13–10 victory over Huddersfield in the Eastern Division Championship Final during the 1962–63 season at Headingley, Leeds on Saturday 10 November 1962.

=== Challenge Cup Final appearances ===
Alan Burwell played stand-off and scored a long-distance solo try in Hull Kingston Rovers' 5–13 defeat by Widnes in the 1963–64 Challenge Cup Final during the 1963–64 season at Wembley Stadium, London on Saturday 9 May 1964, in front of a crowd of 84,488.

=== County Cup Final appearances ===
Alan Burwell played scrum-half and scored a try in Hull Kingston Rovers' 25–12 victory over Featherstone Rovers in the 1966 Yorkshire Cup Final during the 1966–67 season at Headingley, Leeds on Saturday 15 October 1966, played left wing and scored a try in the 8–7 victory over Hull F.C. in the 1967 Yorkshire Cup Final during the 1967–68 season at Headingley, Leeds on Saturday 14 October 1967, and played right-centre in Hull Kingston Rovers' 11–15 defeat by Leeds in the 1975 Yorkshire Cup Final during the 1975–76 season at Headingley, Leeds on Saturday 15 November 1975.
