= Brian Lee (rugby league) =

New Zealand international rugby league footballer

Personal information
- Full name: Brian Stanley Lee
- Born: 19 March 1941 Auckland, New Zealand
- Died: 22 November 1994 (aged 53) Thames, New Zealand

Playing information
- Position: Prop, Second-row
Club
Years	Team	Pld	T	G	FG	P
	Papakura
	Ponsonby
	Total	0	0	0	0	0
Representative
Years	Team	Pld	T	G	FG	P
196?–70	Auckland
1961–68	New Zealand	9	0	0	0	0

Brian Stanley Lee was a New Zealand rugby league footballer who represented New Zealand.

== Playing career ==
Lee played for the Papakura club in the Auckland Rugby League competition and was an Auckland representative. Lee first made the New Zealand national rugby league team in 1961 where he played in three Test matches. He again played for the Kiwis in 1963.

In 1968 he made the World Cup squad and played in three matches. In the match against France he was sent off only twelve minutes into the match.

Lee played for Auckland in 1970 against the touring Great Britain side.
