= Wynnum Manly Seagulls =

Australian rugby league club, based in Manly West, Brisbane QLD

Club information
- Full name: Wynnum Manly Seagulls Rugby League Football Club Ltd.
- Nickname: The Seagulls,
- Colours: White, Green, Red
- Founded: 1951; 75 years ago
- Website: wynnumseagulls.com.au

Current details
- Ground: BMD Kougari Oval, Manly West, Queensland (5,000)
- CEO: Wayne Weekes
- Coach: Mathew Head
- Competition: Queensland Cup
- 2024: 8th
- Current season

Records
- Premierships: 3 (1982, 1984, 1986)
- Runners-up: 1 (1985)
- Minor premierships: 2 (1984, 1997)
- Wooden spoons: 13 (1953, 1957, 1962, 1964, 1966, 1967, 1970, 1971, 1972, 1973, 1979, 1990, 1991)
- Premierships (2nd grade): 3 (1995, 2011, 2012)
- Runners-up (2nd grade): 1 (2019)
- Premierships (3rd grade): 6 (2007, 2018, 2019, 2020, 2023, 2024)
- Runners-up (3rd grade): 5 (2003, 2008, 2012, 2015, 2022)

The Wynnum Manly Seagulls are an Australian rugby league football club based at Kougari Oval, in Brisbane's bayside suburb of Manly West, which neighbours the suburb of Wynnum. They competed in the Brisbane Rugby League from 1951 to 1997. Since 1996 they have competed in the Queensland Cup. Their jersey is red, green and white. From 1995 to 2005 they were known as the Wynnum Seagulls.

== History ==
Wynnum-Manly entered the Brisbane premiership in 1931 but withdrew after two seasons due to the Great Depression. After World War II, the Seagulls re-entered in 1951 as the Wynnum-Manly District Rugby League Football Club, with Jim Cloherty as President until 1964. Before relocating to Kougari Oval in 1967, the club played at Kitchener Park, which now houses the Wynnum Manly Junior Rugby League Club.

Wynnum-Manly won only nine matches in their first three seasons, and it was widely thought they would disappear again in 1954 after they suffered numerous thrashings in first grade – including a 13–89 loss to Valleys when Norm Pope kicked nineteen goals – and forfeitures in the lower grades. "The Seasiders", as they were known then, improved by 1959, when they achieved their first season with more wins than losses and defeated Valleys in the minor semi-final. Winger Lionel Morgan made history in 1960, becoming the first player from Wynnum-Manly and the first Aboriginal player to represent Australia when he debuted against France.

The team faced challenges in the 1960s and 1970s, collecting ten wooden spoons and never finishing higher than fifth in the eight-team competition. By 1980, their win-loss-draw record stood at 173-415-14 in 603 games.

Their fortunes began to turn around in 1981 under President Arthur Lovell. Having secured star players Gene Miles and Greg Dowling from north Queensland, Wynnum-Manly became a power for the first time, winning the Brisbane premiership in 1982, 1984, and 1986, with a runner-up finish in 1985. Four Seagulls players, Miles, Dowling, Bob Lindner and Australian captain Wally Lewis, were part of the "Unbeatables" 1986 Kangaroo squad that completed an unbeaten tour of Great Britain and France. Lindner would be the last non-NSWRL player chosen for Australia.

Facing receivership in the early 1990s, the team rebranded as the Wynnum Seagulls, securing their fourth BRL premiership in 1995. The BRL was succeeded by the Queensland Cup in 1996.

In 2010, Paul Green became Wynnum's coach, leading the team to success in 2011 when they defeated Tweed Head Seagulls twice in the finals series, including in the grand final. The team defended its title in 2012, beating Redcliffe 20–10 in the decider.

== Representative honours ==
=== Australia ===
- Lionel Morgan: 1960
- Johnny Gleeson: 1963, 1964
- John Wittenberg: 1963
- Johnny Rhodes: 1975
- Lew Platz: 1975
- Gene Miles: 1982
- Rod Morris: 1982
- Colin Scott: 1983
- Greg Dowling: 1984
- Wally Lewis: 1984*
- Bob Lindner: 1986

* Wally Lewis who joined the club from Valleys in 1984, is the only Wynnum-Manly player to captain the Australia national rugby league team. Lewis captained the Kangaroos on 16 occasions while a member of the Seagulls from 1984-1987 including captaining the unbeaten 1986 Kangaroo tour of Great Britain and France.

== Personnel ==
Name	Position
Mathew Head	Head Coach
Darren Nicholls Mat Cameron	Assistant Coaches
Tony Guilfoyle	High Performance Manager
Andrew Fields	Head of Strength
Steve Heymer	Head Trainer
Darren McKenzie	Manager

== Results ==
Year	Ladder position	Finals series result
1996	7th	
1997	1st	Semi-finalists
1998	6th	Preliminary finalists
1999	9th	
2000	11th	
2001	6th	
2002	8th	
2003	4th	Preliminary finalists
2004	5th	Preliminary finalists
2005	6th	
2006	9th	
2007	9th	
2008	4th	Semi-finalists
2009	10th	
2010	5th	Semi-finalists
2011	2nd	Premiers
2012	1st	Premiers
2013	4th	Semi-finalists
2014	2nd	Preliminary finalists
2015	4th	Semi-finalists
2016	10th	
2017	10th	
2018	12th	
2019	2nd	Runners-up
2020	N/A	
2021	2nd	Runners-up
2022	9th	
2023	6th	Preliminary finalists

== Head-to-head records ==
Current to 2023 season.

=== Current teams ===
Opponent	Played	Won	Drawn	Lost	Win %
Burleigh	52	17	3	32	32.69
Central	48	35	2	11	72.92
Brisbane Tigers	179	75	4	100	41.90
Ipswich	71	39	3	29	54.93
Mackay	29	18	0	11	62.07
Northern Pride	30	16	0	14	53.33
Norths	175	69	4	102	39.43
Papua New Guinea	14	6	0	8	42.86
Redcliffe	158	57	4	97	36.08
Souths Logan	26	19	0	7	73.08
Sunshine Coast	26	16	0	10	61.54
Western Clydesdales	23	8	1	14	34.78
Townsville	12	5	0	7	41.67
Tweed Heads	44	27	0	17	61.36

=== Former teams ===
Opponent	Played	Won	Drawn	Lost	Win %
Aspley	2	1	0	1	50.00
Broncos	4	2	0	2	50.00
Brothers	130	47	6	77	36.15
Brothers-Valleys	2	2	0	0	100.00
Bundaberg	3	3	0	0	100.00
Cairns	8	5	0	3	62.50
Crushers	4	2	0	2	50.00
Gold Coast	2	0	0	2	0.00
Logan City	29	18	3	8	62.07
Port Moresby Vipers	2	1	0	1	50.00
South Coast	5	2	0	3	40.00
Souths	153	67	2	84	43.79
Valleys	126	32	2	92	25.40
Wests	135	55	4	76	40.44
Young Guns	12	5	1	6	41.67

== See also ==
- National Rugby League reserves affiliations

== Sources ==
- Wynnum Seagulls Results retrieved 26 December 2023
- Wynnum Seagulls Statistics retrieved 7 February 2006
- Wynnum Seagulls Club Profile retrieved 7 February 2006
