= John Percival (rugby league) =

New Zealand rugby league referee

Refereeing information
Years	Competition	Apps
1968–75	World Cup	9
1964–80	Other Internationals	18
- Source: RLP

John Percival was a New Zealand rugby league referee. An international referee, in 1995 Percival was one of the New Zealand Rugby League's inaugural inductions into the "Legends of League".

== Domestic career ==
Percival was from the Point Chevalier Pirates club and played for the 1947 Schoolboy Kiwi side.

He took up refereeing in 1956 and controlled matches in the Auckland Rugby League competition. By 1960 he was receiving provincial appointments. He earned a reputation for being a dominant and "eagle-eyed" referee.

Percival is credited with innovating the penalty for backchat as he regularly used to march teams for the offence before it was added to the official rulebook.

The Auckland Rugby League's Referee of the Year award is named the "John Percival Memorial Premiership Referee of the Year" in recognition of Percival's service to the game.

== International career ==
His first Test match was in 1964 when the French toured New Zealand. Percival controlled 27 internationals between 1964 and 1980, the most for a New Zealand official. This included nine matches in the 1968 and 1975 World Cups. In 1995, Percival was one of the inaugural inductees onto the NZRL's Legends of League. He is an Auckland Rugby League Immortal.

== Later years ==
Percival was involved on the board of the Auckland Warriors in 1995 while they were owned by the Auckland Rugby League.
