= Daniel Pellerin =

France international rugby league player (1941-)

Personal information
- Born: 30 October 1941 (age 84) Rouen, Seine-Maritime, Normandy, France
- Height: 5 ft 7 in (1.70 m)
- Weight: 12 st 6 lb (79 kg)

Playing information
- Position: Wing
Club
Years	Team	Pld	T	G	FG	P
	Villeneuve-sur-Lot
Representative
Years	Team	Pld	T	G	FG	P
1964–70	France	13

Daniel Pellerin (born 30 December 1941) is a French former rugby league player who played in the 1960s and 1970s, as a wing.

== Background ==
Daniel Pellerin was born in Rouen, France.

== Playing career ==
He played for Roanne and for Villeneuve-sur-Lot. He was also called up to represent France at the 1968 Rugby League World Cup, including the final lost against Australia. He also worked as a clerk.

== Honours ==
- Rugby League :
- World Cup :
  - Finalist in 1968 (France).
- French Championship :
  - 2 times finalist in 1965 and 1974 (Villeneuve-sur-Lot).
- Lord Derby Cup :
  - 4 times finalist in 1966, 1969 et 1970 et 1972 (Villeneuve-sur-Lot).

=== Caps ===
17 caps for France

==== Cap details ====
Daniel Pellerin international matches
	Date	Venue	Opponent	Result	Competition	Position	Points	Tries	Pen.	Drops
sous les couleurs de la France
.	25 May 1968	Carlaw Park, Auckland, New Zealand	New Zealand	15-10	World Cup	Wing	-	-	-	-
.	2 June 1968	Lang Park, Brisbane, Australia	Great Britain	7-2	World Cup	Wing	-	-	-	-
.	10 June 1968	Sydney Cricket Ground, Sydney, Australia	Australia	2-20	World Cup	Wing	-	-	-	-
.	28 October 1970	Castleford, England	Great Britain	0-6	World Cup	Wing	-	-	-	-
.	1 November 1970	Bradford, England	Australia	17-15	World Cup	Wing	-	-	-	-
