= Saint-Benoît-de-Carmaux =

- Commune
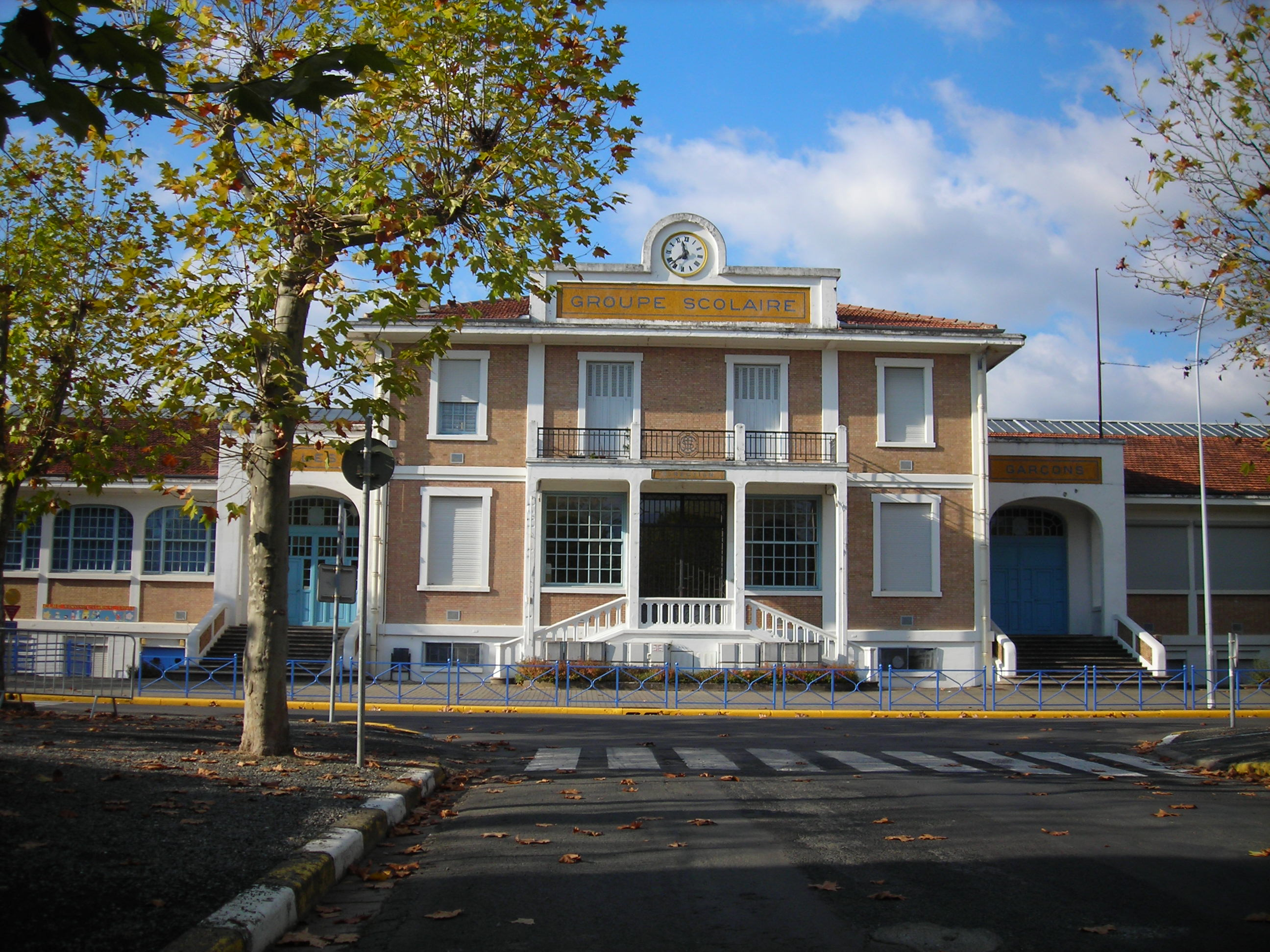
- The school in Saint-Benoît-de-Carmaux

- Coat of arms
- Location of Saint-Benoît-de-Carmaux
- Location within France Location within Occitanie
- Coordinates: 44°03′11″N 2°07′50″E
- Country: France
- Region: Occitania
- Department: Tarn
- Arrondissement: Albi
- Canton: Carmaux-2 Vallée du Cérou
- Intercommunality: Carmausin-Ségala

Government
  - Mayor (2020–2026): Thierry San Andrès
- Area^{1}: 4.49 km^{2} (1.73 sq mi)
- Elevation: 285 m (935 ft)
- Highest elevation: 330 m (1,080 ft)
- Lowest elevation: 217 m (712 ft)
- Population (2023): 2,056
  - Density: 458/km^{2} (1,190/sq mi)
- Time zone: UTC+01:00 (CET)
  - Summer (DST): UTC+02:00 (CEST)
- INSEE/Postal code: 81244 /81400
- ^{1} French Land Register data, which excludes lakes, ponds, glaciers > 1 km^{2} (0.386 sq mi or 247 acres) and river estuaries.

Saint-Benoît-de-Carmaux (French pronunciation: [sɛ̃ bənwa də kaʁmo], literally Saint-Benoît of Carmaux; Languedocien: Sant Benesech de Carmauç) is a commune in the Tarn department in southern France.

== Geography ==
The commune is traversed by the Cérou river.

== Population ==
Historical population
Year	Pop.	±% p.a.
1968	3,579	—
1975	3,171	−1.71%
1982	2,745	−2.04%
1990	2,431	−1.51%
1999	2,265	−0.78%
2007	2,131	−0.76%
2012	2,164	+0.31%
2017	2,165	+0.01%
2023	2,056	−0.86%
Source: INSEE

== See also ==
- Communes of the Tarn department
