= Yves Bégou =

French rugby league player and coach

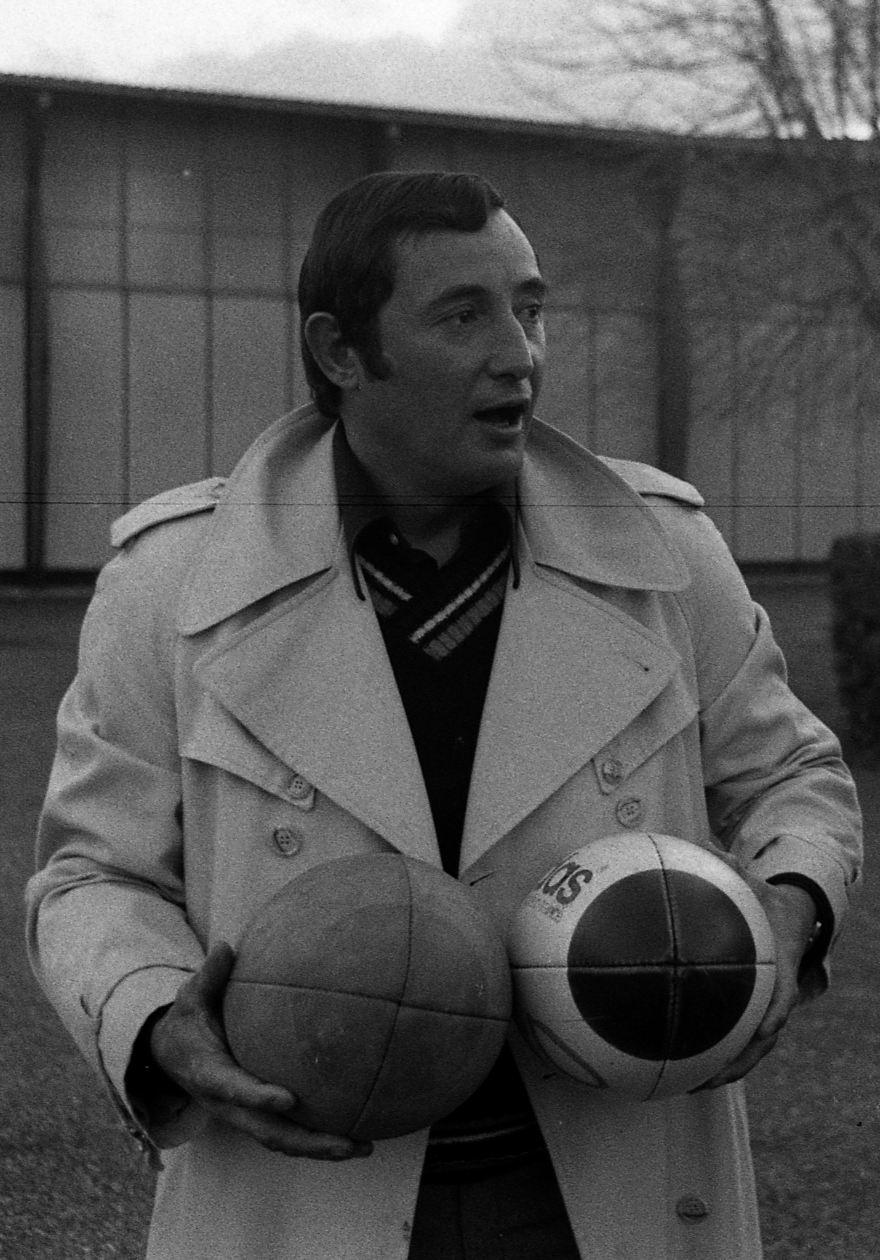
- Bégou coaching Toulouse Olympique during a training in 1976

Personal information
- Born: 1 February 1938 (age 88)
- Height: 5 ft 8 in (1.73 m)
- Weight: 12 st 6 lb (79 kg)

Playing information
- Position: hooker, second-row
Club
Years	Team	Pld	T	G	FG	P
1961–??	RC Albi XIII
19??–69	Toulouse Olympique
1969–71	Villefranche
1973–75	Villefranche
	Total	0	0	0	0	0
Representative
Years	Team	Pld	T	G	FG	P
1964–70	France	15	1	0	0	3

Coaching information
Club
Years	Team	Gms	W	D	L	W%
1973–75	Villefranche
1976	Toulouse Olympique
	Total	0	0	0	0
Representative
Years	Team	Gms	W	D	L	W%
1977	France
- Source: As of 16 January 2021

Yves Bégou is a French former rugby league player, who played as a hooker, later, coach.

== Biography ==
He played for Toulouse. He also represented France, playing in the 1968 Rugby League World Cup, including the final lost against Australia. Outside the game, he worked as a linotype operator. He also coached France in the 1977 Rugby League World Cup.

== Honours ==
=== As player ===
- Rugby league:
- World Cup:
  - Runner-up in 1968 (France).
- French Championship:
  - Runner-up in 1965 (Toulouse).
- Lord Derby Cup:
  - Runner-up in 1968 (Toulouse).

=== As coach ===
- Rugby league:
- Champion of the Rugby League European Championship: 1977 (France)

=== Caps ===
==== International cap details ====
Yves Bégou international matches
	Date	Venue	Opponent	Result	Competition	Position	Points	Tries	Pen.	Drops
playing for France
.	25 May 1968	Carlaw Park, Auckland, New Zealand	New Zealand	15-10	World Cup	Hooker	-	-	-	-
.	2 June 1968	Lang Park, Brisbane, Australia	Great Britain	7-2	World Cup	Hooker	-	-	-	-
.	8 June 1968	Lang Park, Brisbane, Australia	Australia	4-37	World Cup	Hooker	-	-	-	-
.	10 June 1968	Sydney Cricket Ground, Sydney, Australia	Australia	2-20	World Cup	Hooker	-	-	-	-
