= Spencer Dunn =

New Zealand international rugby league footballer

Personal information
- Born: 9 December 1944 (age 80); New Zealand

Playing information
- Position: Wing, Centre
Club
| Years | Team | Pld | T | G | FG | P |
|---|---|---|---|---|---|---|
| | Papanui |
Representative
| Years | Team | Pld | T | G | FG | P |
| 1967–71 | Canterbury | 22 |
| 1968 | New Zealand | 2 | 1 | 0 | 0 | 3 |
- Source: As of 5 May 2025

Spencer Dunn is a New Zealand former rugby league footballer who represented New Zealand in the 1968 World Cup.

== Playing career ==
Dunn was originally from the West Coast but moved to Christchurch to play for Papanui in the Canterbury Rugby League competition. He made the Canterbury side in 1967 and played for Southern Zone against Northern Zone and New South Wales Country. Dunn played for the New Zealand national rugby league team in the 1968 World Cup. He was selected for the 1969 New Zealand under-23 tour of New South Wales but had to withdraw due to injury.
