= Jean-Pierre Lecompte =

France international rugby league player (1941–2024)

Personal information
- Born: 26 June 1941; Saint-Junien, France
- Died: 16 July 2024 (aged 83)

Playing information
- Height: 5 ft 7 in (1.70 m)
- Weight: 11 st 2 lb (71 kg)
- Position: Fullback, Centre
Club
Years	Team	Pld	T	G	FG	P
	Saint-Gaudens
Representative
Years	Team	Pld	T	G	FG	P
1964–68	France	20

Jean-Pierre Lecompte (26 June 1941 – 16 July 2024) was a French rugby league player, he usually played as centre or as wing.

== Biography ==
Lecompte played for Saint-Gaudens He also represented France during the 1968 Rugby League World Cup, including the final lost against Australia. Outside the game, he worked as an instructor at a driving school.

Lecompte died on 16 July 2024, at the age of 83.

== Honours ==
- Rugby league :
- World Cup :
  - Runner-up in 1968 (France).
- French Championship :
  - Champion in 1970 (Saint-Gaudens).
  - 2 times finalist in 1966 and 1967 (Saint-Gaudens).

=== International caps ===
==== Cap details ====
Jean-Pierre Lecompte international caps
	Date	Venue	Opponent	Result	Competition	Position	Points	Tries	Pen.	Drops
playing for France
.	25 May 1968	Carlaw Park, Auckland, New Zealand	New Zealand	15-10	World Cup	Wing	-	-	-	-
.	2 June 1968	Lang Park, Brisbane, Australia	Great Britain	7-2	World Cup	Wing	-	-	-	-
.	10 June 1968	Sydney Cricket Ground, Sydney, Australia	Australia	2-20	World Cup	Wing	-	-	-	-
