= Roger Garrigue =

Former France international rugby league footballer

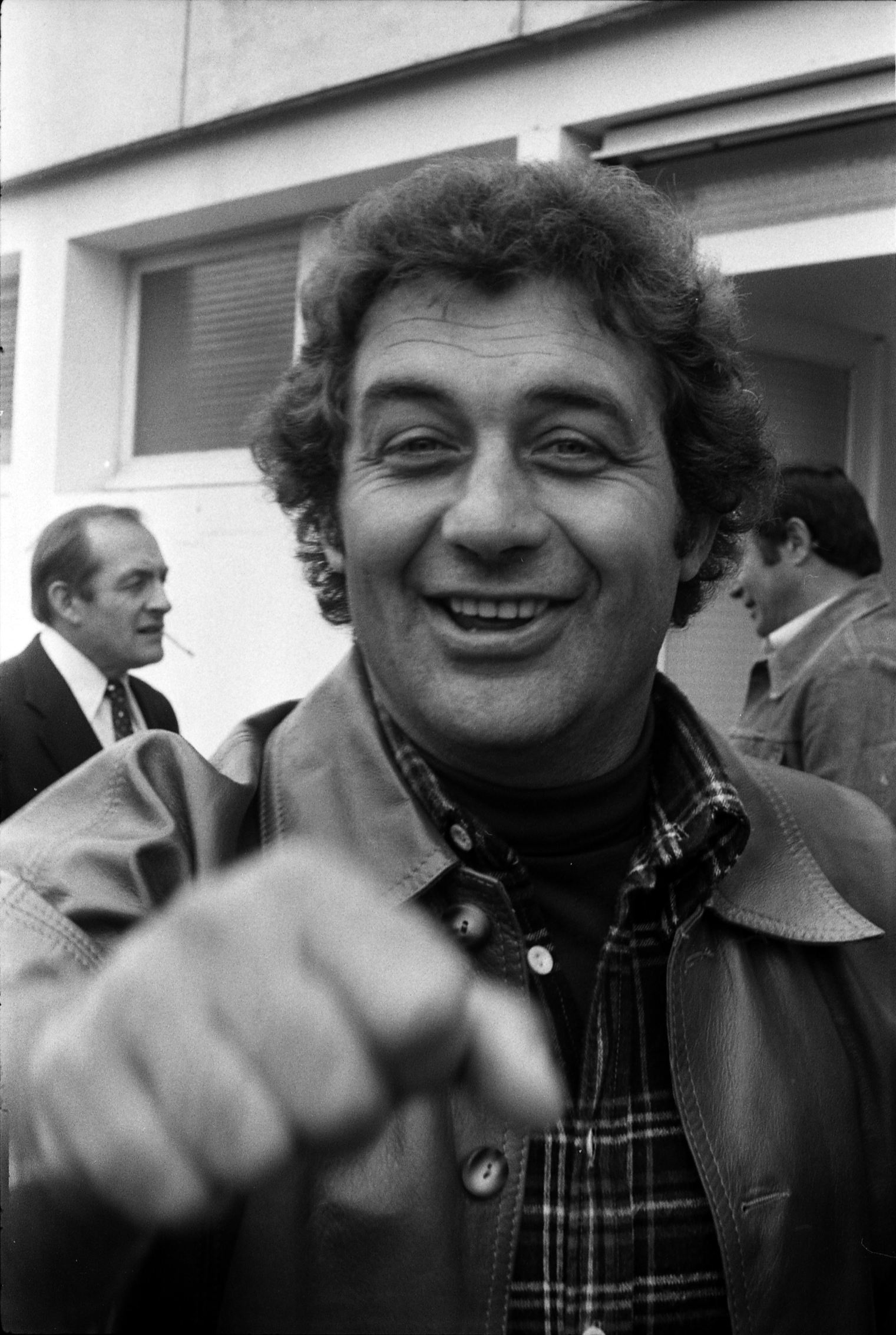

Personal information
- Full name: Roger Garrigues
- Born: 26 June 1941 (age 84); Toulouse, France

Playing information
- Position: Halfback
Club
Years	Team	Pld	T	G	FG	P
19??–69	Albi
1969–??	Saint-Gaudens
1969–74	Toulouse Olympique
1975–76	Villefranche XIII Aveyron
	Total	0	0	0	0	0
Representative
Years	Team	Pld	T	G	FG	P
1964–73	France	15	1	8	4	26

Coaching information
Representative
Years	Team	Gms	W	D	L	W%
1981	France	2	0	0	2	0
- Source: As of 12 February 2021

Roger Garrigue (born 26 June 1941), sometimes written as Roger Garrigues (born in Toulouse, on 26 May 1941), is a French former professional rugby league footballer and coach, who played as centre, stand-off or scrum-half.

== Biography ==
Originally, a rugby union player formed at TOEC XV, Garrigue would later switch codes to play for Saint-Gaudens and then, for Toulouse Olympique, where he would play for most of his career, before joining Villefranche-de-Rouergue.

Defined as "An excellent defender and strategist", an author in 1984 estimated that he missed "the great acceleration, which decides everything, to equal the more sophisticated players at his preferred position".

He also represented France, playing in the 1968 Rugby League World Cup final lost against Australia.

Garrigue also was the coach of France national rugby league team in 1978 and then, in 1981, coaching France in two tests lost against New Zealand in Carlaw Park.

An aeronautical technician, according to a source in 2011, he lives in "Ariège, near Suc".

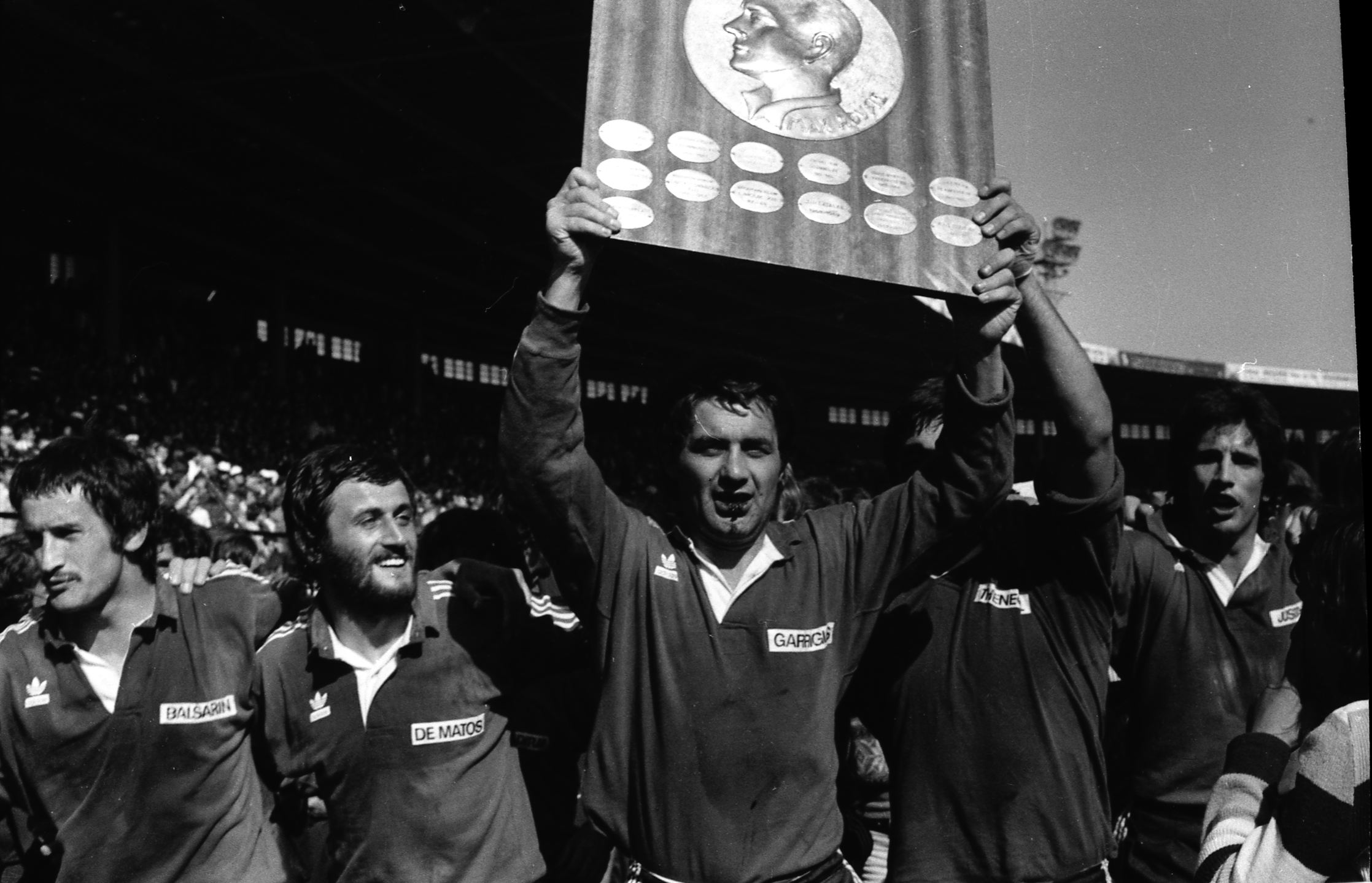
Garrigue (at the centre) celebrating Toulouse Olympique's French Championship title in 1973 after the match against Marseille.

== Honours ==
- Rugby league :
- World Cup :
  - 1 time runner-up in 1968 (France).

== Caps ==
=== International caps ===
	Date	Venue	Opponent	Result	Competition	Position	Points	Essais	Pen.	Drops
playing for France
.	25 May 1968	Carlaw Park, Auckland, New Zealand	New Zealand	15-10	World Cup	Stand-off	2	-	1	-
.	2 June 1968	Lang Park, Brisbane, Australia	Great Britain	7-2	World Cup	Halfback	2	-	1	-
.	10 June 1968	Sydney Cricket Ground, Sydney, Australia	Australia	2-20	World Cup	Halfback	-	-	-	-
.	1 November 1970	Bradford, England	Australia	17-15	World Cup	Halfback	2	-	-	1
