= Garry Smith (rugby league) =

New Zealand rugby league football player (1941–2025)

Personal information
- Full name: Garry Maxwell John Smith
- Born: 4 September 1941 New Zealand
- Died: 13 December 2025 (aged 84) Nelson, New Zealand

Playing information
- Height: 191 cm (6 ft 3 in)
- Weight: 91 kg (14 st 5 lb)
- Position: Prop, Second-row
Club
| Years | Team | Pld | T | G | FG | P |
|---|---|---|---|---|---|---|
| | Runanga (WCRL) |
| | Marist (WRL) |
| | Total | 0 | 0 | 0 | 0 | 0 |
Representative
| Years | Team | Pld | T | G | FG | P |
| | West Coast |
| 1965–1972 | Wellington | 36 |
| 1965 | North Island |
| 1966–1971 | New Zealand | 16 | 3 | 0 | 0 | 9 |

Coaching information
Club
| Years | Team | Gms | W | D | L | W% |
| | Marist (WRL) |

Garry Maxwell John Smith (4 September 1941 – 13 December 2025) was a New Zealand rugby league footballer who played in the 1960s and 1970s. He played for New Zealand in the 1968 and 1970 World Cups, as a prop, or second-row.

== Playing career ==
Smith originally played for the Runanga club on the West Coast, representing the West Coast.

Following a failed transfer to Sydney, Smith joined Marist in the Wellington Rugby League competition. He won premierships with the club in 1965 and 1971. For the 1971 premiership, Smith was also the club's captain-coach.

== Representative career ==
Having already played for the West Coast, Smith became a Wellington representative when he moved to Marist.

In 1965, Smith was selected for the North Island rugby league team and the following year he was first selected for the New Zealand national rugby league team, playing in two losses to Australia. In 1967, he toured Australia, playing in only one test but ten of the seventeen tour games. He played in the 1968 World Cup in Australia and New Zealand and in the 1970 World Cup in Great Britain. In his final season for New Zealand, Smith was a key part of the Grand Slam Kiwis, playing in all seven tests as New Zealand defeated Australia 24–3 and won three-test series against Great Britain 2–1 and France 2 wins and a draw. He finished his career having played in a total of 39 games including 16 tests.

== Death ==
Smith died in Nelson on 13 December 2025, at the age of 84.
