= Jean-René Ledru =

Former France international rugby league footballer

Personal information
- Born: 17 November 1947 (age 77); Vaucluse, Provence-Alpes-Côte d'Azur, France
- Weight: 12 st 8 lb (80 kg)

Playing information
- Position: Wing, Second-row
Club
| Years | Team | Pld | T | G | FG | P |
|---|---|---|---|---|---|---|
| | Avignon |
| | Marseille |
| | Total | 0 | 0 | 0 | 0 | 0 |
Representative
| Years | Team | Pld | T | G | FG | P |
| 1968–74 | France | 4 | 1 | 0 | 0 | 3 |
- As of 28 January 2021

Jean-René Ledru (born in 1947) is a French former rugby league player, who played as wing, second-row.

== Biography ==
He played for Avignon and then, for Marseille. He also represented France at the 1968 Rugby League World Cup, where he also played the final lost against Australia.

== Honours ==
- Rugby league :
- World Cup :
  - Runner-up in 1968 (France).
- French Championship :
  - 1 time finalist in 1973 (Marseille).
- Lord Derby Cup :
  - 1 time finalist in 1975 (Marseille).

=== International caps ===
Jean-René Ledru international caps
| | Date | Venue | Opponent | Result | Competition | Position | Points | Tries | Pen. | Drops |
|---|---|---|---|---|---|---|---|---|---|---|
playing for France
| . | 2 June 1968 | Lang Park, Brisbane, Australia | Grande-Bretain | 7-2 | World Cup | Wing | 3 | 1 | - | - |
| . | 8 June 1968 | Lang Park, Brisbane, Australia | Australie | 4-37 | World Cup | Wing | - | - | - | - |
| . | 10 June 1968 | Sydney Cricket Ground, Sydney, Australia | Australie | 2-20 | World Cup | Wing | - | - | - | - |
