= Colin O'Neil =

New Zealand international rugby league footballer and coach

Personal information
- Full name: Colin Edward O'Neil
- Born: New Zealand

Playing information
- Position: Hooker
Club
Years	Team	Pld	T	G	FG	P
1959–71	Marist (WRL)
Representative
Years	Team	Pld	T	G	FG	P
1963–71	Wellington	74
1965–71	New Zealand	21	0	0	0	0
1964–65	North Island
1967–69	Southern Zone

Coaching information
Club
Years	Team	Gms	W	D	L	W%
1971	Marist

Colin O'Neil is a New Zealand former professional rugby league footballer who played in the 1950s, 1960s and 1970s, and coached in the 1970s. He represented New Zealand in the 1968 and 1970 World Cups.

== Playing career ==
O'Neil made his first grade debut in 1959, playing for Marist in the Wellington Rugby League competition at 16 years of age. He first played for Wellington in 1963 and made his New Zealand national rugby league team debut two years later in 1965, on the tour of Great Britain and France.

O'Neil was part of the squad at the 1968 World Cup and in 1969 was made the Kiwis captain. He won the New Zealand Rugby League player of the year award in 1969, being presented with the first Steve Watene Memorial Trophy. That year he was also the first winner of the Wellington Sportsman of the Year Award.

In 1970, O'Neil became the first player to play over 50 games for Wellington, he is currently the second most capped player, after finishing his career with 74 caps. O'Neil also played for the North Island in 1964 and 1965 and for Southern Zone from 1967 to 1969.

O'Neil again captained the New Zealand side in 1970 and made that year's World Cup squad. O'Neil toured Great Britain and France in 1971 before retiring at the end of that season.

He had played his entire club career with Marist, winning premierships in 1963 (shared), 1965 and 1971. In 1971 O'Neil served as a player/captain/coach of the club.

== Later years ==
In 1990 O'Neil was appointed onto the New Zealand Rugby League board of directors.

== Legacy ==
In 2011 O'Neil was inducted into the Legends of Wellington Sport.

In 2012 O'Neil was named as one of the New Zealand Rugby League's Legends of League. He was also named in the Wellington Rugby League's Team of the Century.
