= Francis de Nadaï =

Former France international rugby league footballer

Personal information
- Full name: Paul-François de Nadaï
- Born: 19 April 1947; Limoux, Aude, Occitania, France
- Died: 14 April 2017 (aged 69); Perpignan, France

Playing information
- Position: Prop, Second-row
Club
Years	Team	Pld	T	G	FG	P
1965–80	Limoux
Representative
Years	Team	Pld	T	G	FG	P
1967–75	France	30	1	0	0	3

Paul-François de Nadaï, known as Francis de Nadaï (19 April 1947 – 14 April 2017) was a French rugby league footballer who represented France in four Rugby League World Cups. He was born in Limoux and died in Perpignan.

== Playing career ==
At club level, de Nadaï played for his entire career for Limoux, with which he won the French Championship in 1968, playing alongside Louis Bonnery and Guy Andrieu.

de Nadaï made his debut for France in 1967, playing against the touring Australian side. He was a part of the French squads for the 1968 and 1970 World Cups and captained the 1972 World Cup squad. He played his final international for France in 1975, as part of the 1975 Rugby League World Championship.

After his retirement, he became a teacher, then, a technical officer for Fédération Française de Rugby à Treize until his resignation in 2005. In 1988, de Nadai had a heart transplantation.
