= Henri Marracq =

France dual-code international rugby player

- Born: 21 November 1937 Pontacq, Pyrénées-Atlantiques, Nouvelle-Aquitaine, France
- Died: 15 May 2003 (aged 65) Aressy, France
- Height: 6 ft 0 in (183 cm)
- Weight: 202 lb (92 kg; 14 st 6 lb)

Rugby union career
- Position: Flanker
Senior career
Years	Team	Apps	(Points)
–	Section Paloise		
International career
Years	Team	Apps	(Points)
1961	France	1	(3)
- Rugby league career

Playing information
- Position: Prop, Second-row
Club
Years	Team	Pld	T	G	FG	P
	Saint-Gaudens XIII
	Pau XIII
	Total	0	0	0	0	0
Representative
Years	Team	Pld	T	G	FG	P
1963–69	France	21

Henri Marracq, (Pontacq, 21 November 1937 – 145 May 2003), was a French rugby dual-code international. he played for France national rugby union team and for France national league team. With the latter, he played the 1968 Rugby League World Cup final against Australia

== Playing career ==
=== Clubs ===
- Section Paloise
- RC Saint-Gaudens XIII
- Pau XIII

=== International (Rugby union) ===
He first played a test match on 12 November 1961 against Romania in Bayonne, where he scored a try.

== Honours ==
=== Club ===
- Rugby union:
- Challenge Yves du Manoir :
  - 1 time finalist in 1962 (Pau).
- Rugby league:
- Rugby League World Cup :
  - 1 time finalist in 1968 (France).
- French Championship :
  - 1 time Champion in 1970 (Saint-Gaudens).
  - 6 times finalist in 1963, 1966, 1967, 1969, 1971 and 1972 (Saint-Gaudens).

=== International (rugby league) ===
He disputed 21 international matches between 1963 and 1969.

Henri Marracq international matches (World Cup)
	Date	Venue	Opponent	Résultat	Competition	Position	Points	Tries	Pen.	Drops
playing for France
.	25 May 1968	Carlaw Park, Auckland, New Zealand	New Zealand	15-10	World Cup	Second-row	-	-	-	-
.	2 June 1968	Lang Park, Brisbane, Australia	Great Britain	7-2	World Cup	Second-row	-	-	-	-
.	10 June 1968	Sydney Cricket Ground, Sydney, Australia	Australia	2-20	World Cup	Second-row	-	-	-	-
