= André Ferren =

France international rugby league footballer

Personal information
- Born: 9 January 1943 (age 82); Vaucluse, Provence-Alpes-Côte d'Azur, France
- Height: 1.78 m (5 ft 10 in)
- Weight: 87 kg (13 st 9 lb)

Playing information
- Position: wing
Club
Years	Team	Pld	T	G	FG	P
19??–??	Avignon
19??–64	Marseille
1964–69	Avignon
1969–??	Marseille
	Total	0	0	0	0	0
Representative
Years	Team	Pld	T	G	FG	P
1964–68	France	5	1	0	0	3
- Source: https://www.rugbyleagueproject.org/players/andre-ferren/summary.html As of 17 January 2021

André Ferren (9 January 1943) was a French international rugby league player. He played as wing.

== Biography ==
Before his rugby league career, Ferren practiced track and field in Avignon, at Stade Saint Ruf. During a training session he entered into the local rugby league team, which also trained at the same facility. He played for Avignon and then, for Marseille, at club level and also represented France at international level, playing the 1968 Rugby League World Cup, earning 5 international caps in his overall career. Outside the game, he worked as a physical training instructor.

== Honours ==
- Rugby league:
- French Championship: Runner-up in 1973 (Marseille)
- Lord Derby Cup: Champion in 1971 (Marseille)
- Rugby League World Cup: Runner-up in 1968 (France)
