= Eric Simms (rugby league) =

Australia international rugby league footballer

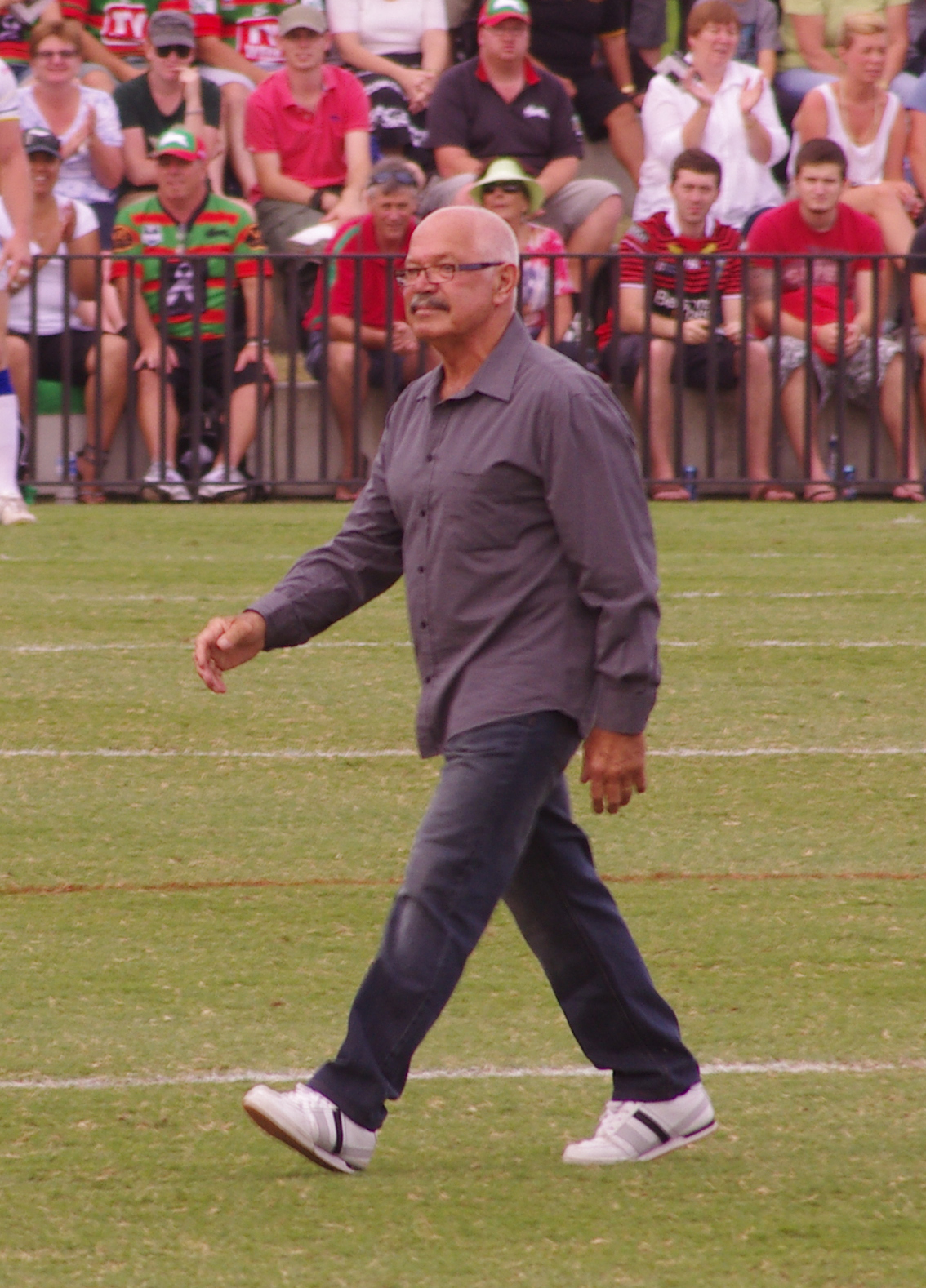
- Simms in 2012

Personal information
- Full name: Eric John Simms
- Born: 2 August 1945 (age 81) Karuah, New South Wales, Australia

Playing information
- Position: Fullback, Centre
Club
Years	Team	Pld	T	G	FG	P
1965–75	South Sydney	206	23	803	86	1841
1976	Crookwell
	Total	206	23	803	86	1841
Representative
Years	Team	Pld	T	G	FG	P
1968	New South Wales	1	0	6	1	14
1968–70	Australia	8	1	39	3	87
1969	NSW City	1	0	4	1	10

Coaching information
Club
Years	Team	Gms	W	D	L	W%
1976–77	Crookwell
1978	La Perouse
	Total	0	0	0	0

Eric Simms (born 2 August 1945) is an Indigenous Australian former professional and national representative rugby league footballer who has been named among the nation's finest of the 20th century. His primary position was at fullback although he could also play as a centre. Simms played his entire first grade career for South Sydney with whom he won four premierships and was top point-scorer for four consecutive seasons.

In August 2008, Simms was named at fullback in the Indigenous Team of the Century. Simms set several records in his playing days, some which still stand. He was a notable goal-kicker (field, penalty and conversion) who once kicked five field goals in eleven minutes (in a match against Penrith in 1969). It has been said of Simms, and specifically his ability to kick field goals, that he's "one of the few men whose influence was such it single-handedly changed the game".

== Early life and education ==
Eric Simms was born in Karuah, New South Wales on 2 August 1945, the eldest son John (Jack) Simms, an Ullugundy Island man, who came to Karuah to live for a while before moving to La Perouse in Sydney. Eric's mother was born Gwendoline May Cook and became Gwendoline Ping when her own mother remarried. Eric and his sister, Beverley, grew up on the former Aboriginal reserve at Karuah, raised by his mother and stepfather, Fred Ridgeway, along with six other younger brothers and sisters. Simms had a total of thirteen siblings although some died at birth.

Eric attended Karuah Public School, and Raymond Terrace High School where "he was taught the art of goalkicking by Les Leggatt, sportsmaster".

== Playing career ==
Simms moved to La Perouse where he played for La Perouse Panthers Junior Rugby League Football Club in the 1964 premiership-winning team. He was a 19-year-old truck driver when he was signed for South Sydney in 1965. He played in the centres for Souths’ grand finalist team which lost to St George (12 – 8) before a then record crowd of 78,056; Simms scored the last points in the game with a penalty goal.

Simms went on to play 206 first grade games, including grand final winning teams in 1967, 1968, 1970 and 1971, scoring a total of 1,841 career points. In 1969, he broke the record for the most points scored in a premiership season with 265, previously held by Dave Brown of Eastern Suburbs. He held the record until broken by Mick Cronin over a decade later.

In 1973 he overtook Keith Barnes' record for the most points scored in an NSWRFL career (1,519); Simms' eventual total of 1,841 stood as the new career record for ten seasons until it was surpassed by Graham Eadie in 1983.

=== Club records ===
Simms set and still holds a number of South Sydney club records:

- second Most points in first grade career: 1841 points (23 tries, 803 goals, 86 field goals);
- Most first grade points in a season: 265 points in 1969 (1 try, 112 goals, 19 field goals);
- Most goals in first grade career: 890;
- Most goals in a first grade season: 131 in 1969;
- Most goals in a first grade game: 11 against Cronulla, 11 April 1969 and against Penrith, 27 July 1969.

Simms is fifth place in the number of most first grade matches: John Sutton (309*), Nathan Merritt (218), Bob McCarthy (211), Craig Coleman (208), and Eric Simms (206).

=== World Cups 1968, 1970 ===
In the 1968 Rugby League World Cup, Simms gained the distinction of becoming the fourth Aboriginal to represent Australia in rugby league. He scored 50 points in four games at the 1968 World Cup, a record which still stands today.

He played in the 1970 World Cup in England two years later and scored 37 points in total. The final, played at Leeds in November, 1970 has been described "as the most savage international ever played" and "a running brawl"; after the full-time whistle, with Australia having won, Simms offered a handshake to the English winger, John Atkinson, who responded by head-butting Simms.

=== Coaching career ===
After the 1975 season, Simms moved to Crookwell, New South Wales, with his wife Sue and three children, Brendon, Kristie and Simone where he was captain-coach in 1976 until an arm injury (sustained in a tackle) forced his playing retirement at age 31. He coached Crookwell in 1977 and returned to Sydney where he coached the La Perouse team in 1978.

=== Goal kicking prowess ===
Simms is regarded as one of the greatest goal kickers in Rugby League.

Ron Coote has said that Simms' kicking ability was a combination of talent and hard work: "Eric would get to training and stand on the halfway line and Clive Churchill would stand under the posts ... . Eric would practise field goals from halfway one after the other for half an hour. Bang, bang, bang straight over. He hardly ever missed."

Simms has said: "Of course anyone can do it in training but it's harder when people are charging at you and the crowd is booing. Often I'd have to kick from weird angles under all sorts of pressure. Against Wests once I remember Mick Alchin coming around from the scrumbase to flatten me just as I took a shot. He hit me so hard that I went up in the air and came down flat on my back. But I was watching the ball go between the posts. I must have timed the kick just right."

Of the field goal rule change, he has said: "I never really believed the league changed the rule because of me ... . But over the years so many people told me I was the cause that there must be something to it."

== Awards and honours ==
In 2001 he was named in the Indigenous Team of the Century at the Eric Simms Challenge - A Tribute to Indigenous Rugby League, Redfern Oval, June 2001. The team was chosen by a panel chaired by then Senator Aden Ridgeway, a former South Sydney junior league player and then deputy leader of the Australian Democrats in the Australian Senate; other panel members were Ian Heads (rugby league journalist and historian), Frank Hyde, Roy Masters and David Middleton (a rugby league historian). The Eric Simms Challenge was described by the Rabbitohs' marketing manager as "a salute to all Aboriginal and Torres Strait Island players, past and present" and was a match between the NRL Rabbitohs team and a representative Aboriginal team, the Murdi Paaki Warriors, a development side from western New South Wales ("from the Queensland border, across to Burren Junction in the east, to Gulargambone in the south-east, through to Bourke, Cobar, Ivanhoe and down to the Victorian border").

== Life after league ==
In 1977, Simms returned to the family home, Chifley Sydney where he started work on the wharves, an industry in which he has worked for more than 30 years. He worked at Port Botany where the demands of shift work put an end to his coaching days and his rugby league career. By 1997, he was a foreman for P&O on the White Bay wharves at Port Sydney. In September 2008 he was living in a southern Sydney suburb and working at the Rozelle wharves.

Eric Simms married Charlene. They have two children. Simms has three children to first wife Sue.

== Footnotes ==
Preceded by Keith Barnes (1966)	Record-holder; Most points in an NSWRFL career 1973 (1,520) - 1983 (1,841)	Succeeded by Graham Eadie (1983)
