= Serge Marsolan =

France international rugby league player

Personal information
- Born: 22 April 1945 (age 79); Samatan, Gers, Occitania, France
- Height: 5 ft 7 in (1.70 m)

Playing information

Rugby union
- Position: Centre, Wing
Club
Years	Team	Pld	T	G	FG	P
	Lombez Samatan Club
1965–68	Auch
	Total	0	0	0	0	0

Rugby league
- Position: Centre, Wing
Club
Years	Team	Pld	T	G	FG	P
1968–??	Saint-Gaudens
	Miremont
	Total	0	0	0	0	0
Representative
Years	Team	Pld	T	G	FG	P
1968–74	France	17				21

Serge Marsolan is a former French rugby league international after debuting in rugby union.

== Career ==
He practiced rugby union in Lombez since 12 years, then at the club born from the merger of the Lombez and Samatan clubs. Later, he joined Auch at the age of 22 for three seasons before switching codes to rugby league following a disagreement with the Auch club.

His arrival in rugby league at Saint-Gaudens was successful as he formed with Michel Molinier one of the most performant winger combinations. The two teammates are regularly selected for the France national team. Marsolan notably took part at the 1970 and 1972 World Cups. At Saint-Gaudens, he takes part to five French Championship finals in 1969, 1970 (won), 1971, 1973 et 1974 (won), and won as well the Lord Derby Cup in 1972.
