= Johnny Rhodes (rugby league) =

Australia international rugby league player

John Rhodes
Personal information
- Full name: John Rhodes
- Born: 14 March 1948 (age 78) Brisbane, Queensland, Australia

Playing information
- Position: Wing
Club
Years	Team	Pld	T	G	FG	P
196?–6?	Wests (Brisbane)
1968–72	Canterbury-Bankstown	62	24	0	0	72
197?–7?	Wynnum Manly
	Total	62	24	0	0	72
Representative
Years	Team	Pld	T	G	FG	P
1968	New South Wales	3	0	0	0	0
1975–76	Queensland	5	1	2	0	7
1968–75	Australia	11	2	0	0	6

Coaching information
Club
Years	Team	Gms	W	D	L	W%
1977–78	Fortitude Valley	45	24	0	21	53

Johnny Rhodes (born 1948) is an Australian former rugby league footballer who played in the 1960s and 1970s. A Queensland state and Australia national representative three-quarter back, he for Brisbane Rugby League clubs, Wests and Wynnum Manly, and in the New South Wales Rugby League, also being selected to play for the New South Wales Blues whilst there.

Born in Brisbane, Queensland on 14 March 1948, Rhodes originally played for the Western Brisbane club of the Brisbane Rugby League. He moved south to play in the 1968 NSWRFL season for Sydney's Canterbury-Bankstown club. That year Rhodes earned selection for the New South Wales team and also the Australian 1968 World Cup squad, becoming a member of the team which defeated France in the final. Having returned to the Brisbane Rugby League to play for Wynnum Manly, he was selected again in 1975 for the World Cup squad.

In 1977-78 Rhodes coached the Fortitude Valley Diehards in the Brisbane Rugby League.
