= Johnny Greaves (rugby league) =

Australia international rugby league player

Personal information
- Full name: Johnny William Greaves
- Born: 8 May 1943 (age 83) Portland, New South Wales, Australia

Playing information
- Position: Centre
Club
Years	Team	Pld	T	G	FG	P
1962–63	St. George Dragons	28	16	0	0	48
1964–72	Canterbury-Bankstown	105	38	27	0	168
	Total	133	54	27	0	216
Representative
Years	Team	Pld	T	G	FG	P
1966–68	New South Wales	7	5	0	0	15
1966–68	Australia	16	7	0	0	21
1968	NSW City	1	0	0	0	0
1973	NSW Country	1	0	0	0	0
- Source: As of 25 October 2019

Johnny Greaves (born 8 May 1943) is an Australian former professional rugby league footballer who played in the 1960s and 1970s. He played for St. George, Canterbury-Bankstown, New South Wales and for Australia.

== Playing career ==
Greaves' junior club was Renown United. Starting with the St George Dragons where he had been a local junior Greaves, like Brian James battled for recognition in the star-studded Dragons line-up who boasted a choice of centres with Reg Gasnier, Billy Smith and Johnny Riley in their squad. Nonetheless, Greaves managed 23 first grade appearances in his two years at senior level with the club.

He shifted to Canterbury where he became a first-grade regular and from where he was chosen in 1966 for New South Wales and later that year to represent Australia in the two Tests of the domestic Ashes series against Great Britain.

He was a member of the Canterbury side which knocked St George out of the 1967 final thereby ending the Dragons' record breaking run but a week later suffered the ignominy as the man left to chase down Bob McCarthy in the 1967 Grand Final after Greaves was waiting on a pass from his hooker Col Brown which McCarthy intercepted and changed the course of the game and decided the premiership.

He selected on the 1967 Kangaroo tour where he played in four Tests against Great Britain and France and in ten minor matches. He was a member of Australia's victorious 1968 World Cup squad. He is listed on the Australian Players Register as Kangaroo No. 406.

Greaves captained Canterbury in 1970 and after leaving the club made his final representative appearance in 1973 from CRL Group 6 club Campbelltown City Kangaroos RLFC, when he turned out for Country Firsts. Greaves finished his career as captain- coach of the Campbelltown City Kangaroos, leading them to the 1973, 1974 & 1975 CRL Group 6 1st Grade titles.
