= 1968 Rugby League World Cup =

4th Rugby League World Cup tournament

1968 World Cup
- Number of teams: 4
- Host countries: Australia; New Zealand
- Winner: Australia (2nd title)
- Matches played: 7
- Attendance: 220,683 (31,526 per match)
- Points scored: 227 (32.43 per match)
- Top scorer: (Australia) Eric Simms (56)
- Top try scorers: (Australia) Lionel Williamson (4) (Australia) Ron Coote (4) (United Kingdom) Clive Sullivan (4)

The 1968 Rugby League World Cup was the fourth World Cup for men’s national teams and was held between 25 May and 10 June and for the first time co-hosted by Australia and New Zealand. Australia were the Champions after they defeated France in the final.

== Background ==
The World Cup was initially set to be played in 1965 however, the Australian Board of Control recommended postponing the tournament to which the English Rugby League Council agreed in November 1964.

It was thought that South Africa might finally debut at the world cup, especially after they defeated New Zealand by one point in a non-test match at the end of their 1963 tour of Australia and New Zealand. The South African squad contained several Australian players who replaced South African's injured earlier in the tour though. However, the New Zealand Rugby League council did not support a World Cup entry from South Africa thinking them not ready and unable to draw sufficient spectators.

For the first time a final to determine the World Cup was specifically pre-arranged (previous finals having only been used when teams finished level on points) and the tournament made a profit for the first time. A total of $120,000 in profit (it grossed $175,000 from five matches in Australia and $60,000 from two matches in New Zealand) was made and was shared among the four competing nations.

The 1968 World Cup was the first to be played under limited tackles rules, the number then being four tackles. The round 1 match between Great Britain and Australia attracted an attendance of 62,256, the highest for a World Cup match until 1992. The final was held at the Sydney Cricket Ground; a crowd of 54,290 watched Australia defeat France. The stars of the Australian team in the tournament were skipper Johnny Raper, second-rower Ron Coote, who scored spectacular tries in each and every game, and the dead-shot kicker Eric Simms, who harvested a record 25 goals (50 points).

== Venues ==
(Australia) Sydney	(Australia) Brisbane	(New Zealand) Auckland
Sydney Cricket Ground	Lang Park	Carlaw Park
Capacity: 70,000	Capacity: 40,000	Capacity: 20,000

== Group Stage ==
Team	Pld	W	D	L	PF	PA	PD	Pts	Qualification
Australia	3	3	0	0	93	26	+67	6	Qualified for the World Cup final
France	3	2	0	1	26	49	−23	4	Qualified for the World Cup final
Great Britain	3	1	0	2	50	46	+4	2	
New Zealand	3	0	0	3	36	84	−48	0	

25 May

New Zealand	10 – 15	France

Carlaw Park, Auckland
Attendance: 18,000
Referee: Col Pearce (AUS)

France: Jean-Claude Cros; Daniel Pellerin, Michel Molinier, Jean-Pierre Lecompte, André Ferren; Jean Capdouze, Roger Garrigue; Georges Ailleres (c), Yves Bégou, Christian Sabatié, Francis de Nadaï, Henri Marracq, Jean-Pierre Clar
New Zealand: R Tait; R Mincham, H Sinel, P Schultz, E Wiggs; J Bond (c), J Clarke; O Danielson, Colin O'Neil, George Smith, B Lee, J Dixon, A Kriletich; Henry Tatana.
After only twelve minutes, New Zealand second-rower Brian Lee was sent off in a match in which the classy French stand-off Jean Capdouze bagged 13 points. The game was also notable for the first World Cup substitution when Adolphe Alésina replaced second-rower Francis de Nadaï.

25 May

Australia	25 – 10	Great Britain

Sydney Cricket Ground, Sydney
Attendance: 62,256
Referee: John Percival (New Zealand)

A record World Cup crowd of 62,256 saw New Zealand referee John Percival mercilessly penalising Great Britain, with debutant full-back Eric Simms booting a record eight goals in Australia's win.

1 June

Australia	31 – 12	New Zealand

Lang Park, Brisbane
Attendance: 23,608

Simms repeated the feat of kicking eight goals as he had in the previous match as Australia eventually killed off New Zealand at Brisbane after trailing for much of the game.

2 June

France	7 – 2	Great Britain

Carlaw Park, Auckland
Attendance: 15,760

France surprised Britain in a rain-ruined match at Auckland with an uncharacteristically stubborn defensive display and winger Jean-René Ledru, scoring the winning try to qualify for a World Cup final showdown against Australia.

8 June

Australia	37 – 4	France

Lang Park, Brisbane
Attendance: 32,664

In the final preliminary game in Brisbane, Australia's scrum-half back Billy Smith dropped three goals. French winger Jean-René Ledru and Australia's prop Artie Beetson were both sent off.

8 June

Great Britain	38 – 14	New Zealand

Sydney Cricket Ground, Sydney
Attendance: 14,105

== Final ==
The final had been billed a 'debacle' following Great Britain's inexplicable loss to France in Auckland, resulting in France contesting the final against Australia despite having been beaten by Australia seven tries to none two days prior. Nonetheless, it attracted a record crowd of 54,290 for a World Cup final match.

10 June 1968

Australia	20–2	France
Try: Lionel Williamson (2); Ron Coote; Johnny Greaves; Goals: Eric Simms (4)		Try: Goals: Field Goals: Jean Capdouze (1)

Sydney Cricket Ground, Sydney
Attendance: 54,290
Referee: John Percival (New Zealand)
Player of the Match: John Wittenberg

Australia	France

FB	1	Eric Simms
LW	2	Johnny Rhodes
RC	3	Graeme Langlands
LC	4	Johnny Greaves
RW	5	Lionel Williamson
FE	6	Bob Fulton
HB	7	Billy Smith
LK	8	Johnny Raper (c)
SR	9	Ron Coote
SR	10	Dick Thornett
PR	11	Arthur Beetson
HK	12	Fred Jones
PR	13	John Wittenberg
Substitutions:
IC	14
IC	15	Elton Rasmussen
Coach:
(Australia) Harry Bath

FB	1	Jean-Claude Cros
RW	2	Daniel Pellerin
RC	3	Jacques Gruppi
LC	4	Jean-Pierre Lecompte
LW	19	Jean-René Ledru
FE	6	Jean Capdouze
HB	7	Roger Garrigue
PR	8	Christian Sabatié
HK	9	Yves Bégou
PR	10	George Ailleres (c)
SR	11	Francis de Nadaï
SR	12	Henri Marracq
LF	13	Jean-Pierre Clar
Substitutions:
IC	14
IC	16	Jacques Gruppi
Coach:
(France) Jep Lacoste

The undefeated Australians went into the tournament decider as favourites. However France offered stern resistance and held the Australians to 0–7 at half-time and with quarter of an hour were only 0–12 down before losing 2–20. It was Australia's second World Cup title.

== Try scorers ==
4

- (Australia) Ron Coote
- (Australia) Lionel Williamson
- (United Kingdom) Clive Sullivan

3

- (New Zealand) Paul Schultz

2

- (Australia) Bob Fulton
- (Australia) Johnny Greaves
- (Australia) Johnny King
- (Australia) Billy Smith
- (United Kingdom) Ian Brooke
- (United Kingdom) Alan Burwell

1

- (Australia) Fred Jones
- (Australia) Johnny Raper
- (France) Jean Capdouze
- (France) Jean-René Ledru
- (United Kingdom) Arnie Morgan
- (United Kingdom) Mick Shoebottom
- (New Zealand) Spencer Dunn
