= Lionel Williamson =

Australia international rugby league footballer

Personal information
- Born: 8 April 1944 (age 82) Innisfail, Queensland, Australia

Playing information
- Position: Wing
Club
Years	Team	Pld	T	G	FG	P
1964–65	Halifax	10	5	0	0	15
1965–67	Bradford Northern	48	25	0	0	75
1969–74	Newtown	112	41	0	0	123
	Total	170	71	0	0	213
Representative
Years	Team	Pld	T	G	FG	P
1964–68	Queensland	10	0	0	0	0
1968	North Queensland
1968–74	Australia	11	6	0	0	18
1970–74	New South Wales	3	1	0	0	3
1971	City NSW	1	0	0	0	0
- Relatives: Luke Williamson (nephew); Lindsay Collins (grandson)

Lionel Williamson (born 8 April 1944) is an Australian former rugby league footballer who played in the 1960s and 1970s. A talented wing, he played in the New South Wales Rugby Football League premiership with the Newtown club and also represented Queensland and Australia.

Born in Innisfail, Queensland, Williamson played in the Queensland side from 1964 to 1967. He also played a season in England with Halifax in 1964–65, and two seasons with Bradford Northern, helping them win the 1965 Yorkshire Cup.

Gaining selection in Australia's 1968 World Cup squad, he scored two tries in the Final against France. He moved to Sydney to play with Newtown from 1969 and played 6 continuous seasons with the club. During this time he also played for Innisfail in North Queensland.

He played in the 1970 World Cup, again scoring in the final to help Australia to victory. Williamson continued representing Australia until 1974 which was also his final year playing for Newtown.

In 2008, the centenary year of rugby league in Australia, Williamson was named in the Newtown Jets 18-man team of the century.

Williamson is the brother of former Queensland and Newtown winger Henry Williamson, the grandfather of Sydney Roosters prop Lindsay Collins and the uncle of former Adelaide Rams, Canberra Raiders, Northern Eagles and Manly-Warringah Sea Eagles goal kicking utility player Luke Williamson.
