= John Wittenberg =

Australia international rugby league footballer

Personal information
- Full name: John Julius Wittenberg
- Born: 2 October 1939 Wide Bay, Queensland, Australia
- Died: 3 November 2005 (aged 66) Burren Junction, New South Wales, Australia

Playing information
- Position: Prop
Club
Years	Team	Pld	T	G	FG	P
1961	Newtown (Toowoomba)
1962–63	Wynnum Manly
1964–66	Theodore
1968–70	St George Dragons	53	4	0	0	12
	Total	53	4	0	0	12
Representative
Years	Team	Pld	T	G	FG	P
1962–66	Queensland	9	1	0	0	3
1968–70	New South Wales	5	0	0	0	0
1966–70	Australia	6	0	0	0	0
- Relatives: Jeff Wittenberg (son)

John Wittenberg (2 October 1939 – 3 November 2005) was an Australian professional rugby league footballer. A front-row forward with the St. George Dragons, he was a representative in the Australian national team in 1966 and from 1968 to 1970 earning six Test caps.

== Playing career ==
Wittenberg was from Wide Bay, Queensland and played for Toowoomba, the Wynnum-Manly Seagulls and in the Central Queensland town of Theodore in the early and mid sixties from which clubs he represented for Queensland and Australia. The Queensland Rugby League attempted to block his transfer to Sydney in 1967 forcing him to sit out the 1967 season and causing him to miss selection for the 1967 Kangaroo Tour.

He played 53 games for the St. George Dragons from 1968 to 1970 representing for New South Wales and regaining Australian representative selection during that time. Four of his representative caps were at the 1968 World Cup played in Sydney including the World Cup Final victory against France in June 1968.

He died of a heart attack while working on his farming property in Burren Junction west of Wee Waa, New South Wales aged 66. His son, Jeff, played professionally in Australia and England.

== Sources ==
- St George Dragons Player History Website http://www.showroom.com.au/dragons/dragonshistory
- Andrews, Malcolm (2006) The ABC of Rugby League Austn Broadcasting Corpn, Sydney
- Queensland representatives at qrl.com.au
