= Georges Aillères =

French rugby league player (1934–2024)

George Aillères
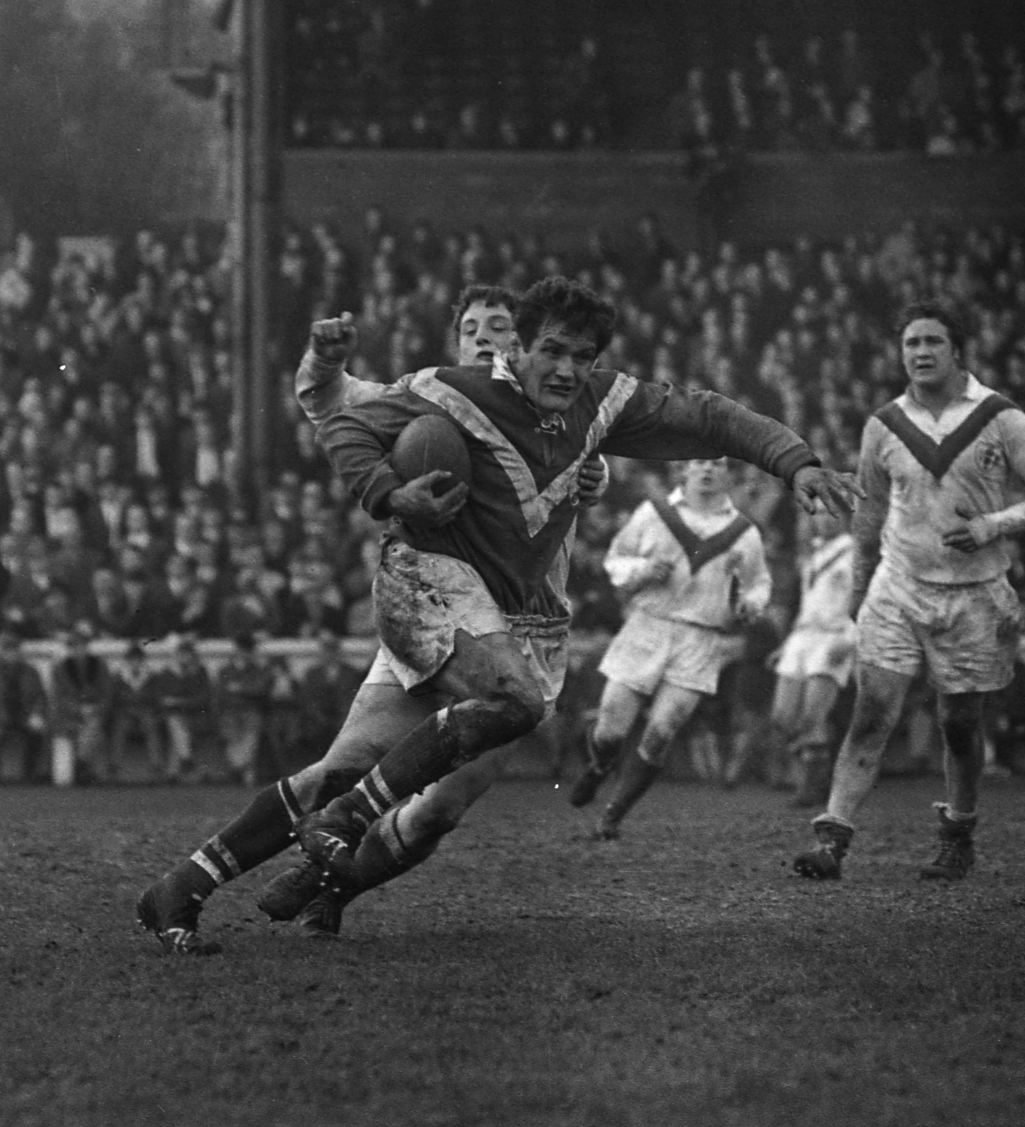
- Aillères playing against Great Britain in Wigan, 1967
- Born: 3 December 1934 Poucharramet, Haute-Garonne, France
- Died: 20 October 2024 (aged 89) Rieumes, France

Rugby union career
- Position(s): Prop, Lock
Senior career
Years	Team	Apps	(Points)
- Rieumes
- TOEC
- Rugby league career

Playing information
- Position: Prop, Second-row, Loose forward
Club
Years	Team	Pld	T	G	FG	P
19??–65	Toulouse Olympique
1966	Lézignan Sangliers
1967–??	Toulouse Olympique
	Total	0	0	0	0	0
Representative
Years	Team	Pld	T	G	FG	P
1961–70	France	34	1	0	0	3

Coaching information
Club
Years	Team	Gms	W	D	L	W%
	Toulouse Olympique
- Source: As of 16 January 2021

George Aillères (3 December 1934 – 20 October 2024) was a French rugby league player who represented France in the 1968 World Cup. He was the father of the fellow France rugby league international Pierre Aillères. He was nicknamed "Le Cube" ("The Cube") due to his "imposing physical presence".

== Playing career ==
Before switching to rugby league, Aillères played rugby union for Rieumes and then for Toulouse Olympique Employés Club. Later, he started his rugby league career playing for Toulouse Olympique, with which he arrived second at the championship final in 1964 and won a championship title in 1965. He then joined briefly Lézignan Sangliers, winning the Lord Derby Cup in 1966, before returning to Toulouse Olympique. Aillères made his French debut in 1961. He toured New Zealand in 1964. He was selected as the French captain for the 1968 Rugby League World Cup. George played in his last match for France in 1970.

== Honours and legacy ==
The Challenge Georges Aillères is named in his honour. Initially established in 2012 as a pre-season tournament, it became the league cup for Elite 2 in 2016.

In December 2021, Aillères was inducted into France's national sports hall of fame Gloire du sport.

== Personal life ==
Aillères's son, Pierre, represented France at rugby league in the 1980s and 1990s.

== Death ==
Aillères died on 20 October 2024, at the age of 89.
