= 1975 Rugby League World Cup =

1975 World Cup
- Number of teams: 5
- Host countries: Australia; France; New Zealand; United Kingdom
- Winner: Australia (4th title)
- Matches played: 21
- Attendance: 204,476 (9,737 per match)
- Points scored: 661 (31.48 per match)
- Top scorer: (Australia) Mick Cronin (76)
- Top try scorers: (England) Keith Fielding (7) (Australia) Ian Schubert (7)

The 1975 Rugby League World Cup (officially known as the 1975 Rugby League World Championship) was the seventh World Cup for men’s rugby league national teams and ran from 2 March to 12 November. Australia were the winners for a fourth time after topping the group table.

Unlike previous World Cups, there was no one host country, with the five participating nations hosting matches over eight months. Each team had to play the others on a 'home and away' basis. For the first time Great Britain did not compete and instead England and Wales entered to participate for the first time, taking advantage of a glut of Welsh talent in the British game at the time.

== Venues ==
14 venues across the five competing countries hosted games of the 1975 Rugby League World Cup. Wales used their own home venue at Swansea, but also played home games in England in both Salford and Warrington. England also played a 'home' game against Wales at Lang Park in Brisbane, Australia.

(Australia) Sydney	(France) Marseille	(Australia) Brisbane	(England) Bradford	(England) Wigan
Sydney Cricket Ground	Stade Vélodrome	Lang Park	Odsal Stadium	Central Park
Capacity: 70,000	Capacity: 49,000	Capacity: 40,000	Capacity: 40,000	Capacity: 40,000
(France) Toulouse	(England) Leeds	(France) Bordeaux	(New Zealand) Auckland	(England) Salford
Stadium Municipal	Headingley	Stade du Parc Lescure	Carlaw Park	The Willows
Capacity: 35,000	Capacity: 32,000	Capacity: 30,000	Capacity: 20,000	Capacity: 17,000
(Wales) Swansea	(New Zealand) Christchurch	(England) Warrington	(France) Perpignan	
St Helen's Rugby Ground	Addington Showgrounds	Wilderspool Stadium	Stade Gilbert Brutus	
Capacity: 15,000	Capacity: 15,000	Capacity: 15,000	Capacity: 13,000	

== Warm-up games ==
The teams arranged a number of warm-up games against local opposition during the World Championship, detailed below.

England

Date	Opponents	Score	Venue	Attendance
1 June	Western Australia	Won 40–2	Perth	6,000
7 June	Toowoomba	Won 25–16	Toowoomba	3,000
15 June	Southern Division (NSW)	Won 19–8	Gosforth	3,000
18 June	North Island (NZ)	Won 42–4	Huntly	2,490
29 June	Illawarra	Lost 12–15	Wollongong	4,000
2 July	Brisbane	Lost 10–21	Brisbane	9,000
6 July	Papua New Guinea	Won 40–12	Port Moresby	12,000

Wales

Date	Opponents	Score	Venue	Attendance
5 June	Ipswich	Won 35–13	Ipswich	4,000
18 June	Wellington	Won 52–8	Wellington	2,000
22 June	West Coast (NZ)	Won 35–5	Greymouth	2,000
24 June	Canterbury	Won 25–18	Christchurch	2,500
1 July	Auckland	Lost 5–31	Auckland	12,000
3 July	New Zealand Māori	Won 18–12	Rotorua	2,500

France

Date	Opponents	Score	Venue	Attendance
12 June	Auckland	Lost 3–9	Auckland	10,000
22 June	Wide Bay	Won 36–10	Bundaberg	4,000
25 June	Lithgow-Oberon	Won 24–17	Lithgow	1,360
27 June	NSW Group 6	Lost 0–2	Campbelltown	2,600
29 June	Monaro	Lost 0–26	Queanbeyan	5,700

Australia

Date	Opponents	Score	Venue	Attendance
30 September	Auckland	Won 17–6	Auckland	7,251
10 October	Salford	Won 44–6	Salford	5,357
12 October	St Helens	Won 32–7	St Helens	10,170
23 October	Rouergue XIII	Won 35–4	Albi	2,000
4 November	Oldham	Won 20–10	Oldham	3,575
9 November	York	Won 45–4	York	4,082

New Zealand

Date	Opponents	Score	Venue	Attendance
15 May	North Queensland Firsts	Lost 16–20	Townsville	
18 May	Central Queensland	Won 57–11	Rockhampton	
21 May	Northern Division	Won 37–19	Tamworth	
24 May	NSW Country Firsts	Won 33–26	Newcastle	6,000
27 May	North Coast	Lost 3–12	Tweed Heads	
1 November	South West France	Won 39–4		
4 November	Barrow	Won 24–0	Barrow-in-Furness	
9 November	Keighley	Won 20–8	Keighley	

== Results ==
2 March

France	14 – 7	Wales

Stade Municipal, Toulouse
Attendance: 7,563
Referee: Fred Lindop (England)

16 March

England	20 – 2	France

Headingley, Leeds
Attendance: 10,842
Referee: Keith Page (Australia) (Harry Hunt (England) )

1 June

Australia	36 – 8	New Zealand

Lang Park, Brisbane
Attendance: 12,000
Referee: Francois Escande (France)

10 June

England	7 – 12	Wales

Lang Park, Brisbane
Attendance: 6,000
Referee: Don Lancashire (Australia)

14 June

Australia	30 – 13	Wales

Sydney Cricket Ground, Sydney
Attendance: 25,386
Referee: Francois Escande (France)

In this match Mick Cronin kicked nine goals.

15 June

New Zealand	27 – 0	France

Addington Showground, Christchurch
Attendance: 2,500
Referee: Laurie Bruyeres (Australia)

21 June

New Zealand	17 – 17	England

Carlaw Park, Auckland
Attendance: 12,000
Referee: Laurie Bruyeres (Australia)

22 June

Australia	26 – 6	France

Lang Park, Brisbane
Attendance: 9,000
Referee: John Percival (New Zealand)

28 June

Australia	10 – 10	England

Sydney Cricket Ground, Sydney
Attendance: 33,858
Referee: John Percival (New Zealand)

28 June

New Zealand	13 – 8	Wales

Carlaw Park, Auckland
Attendance: 9,368
Referee: Laurie Bruyeres (Australia)

20 September

Wales	16 – 22	England

Wilderspool Stadium, Warrington
Attendance: 5,034
Referee: Marcel Caillol (France)

27 September

New Zealand	8 – 24	Australia

Carlaw Park, Auckland
Attendance: 18,000
Referee: Fred Lindop (England)

11 October

France	2 – 48	England

Stade du Parc Lescure, Bordeaux
Attendance: 1,581
Referee: John Percival (New Zealand)

England winger Keith Fielding created a new record by scoring four tries against a hapless French team at Bordeaux.

17 October

France	12 – 12	New Zealand

Stade Vélodrome, Marseille
Attendance: 10,000
Referee: Billy Thompson (England)

19 October

Wales	6 – 18	Australia

St. Helen's Rugby Ground, Swansea
Attendance: 11,112
Referee: John Percival (New Zealand)

Kangaroo wing prodigy Ian Schubert also scored a hat-trick of tries.

25 October

England	27 – 12	New Zealand

Odsal Stadium, Bradford
Attendance: 5,507
Referee: Andre Lacaze (France)

English stand-off Ken Gill ran in three tries.

26 October

France	2 – 41	Australia

Stade Gilbert Brutus, Perpignan
Attendance: 10,440
Referee: Billy Thompson (England)

1 November

England	16 – 13	Australia

Central Park, Wigan
Attendance: 9,353
Referee: John Percival (New Zealand)

2 November

Wales	25 – 24	New Zealand

St. Helen's Rugby Ground, Swansea
Attendance: 2,645
Referee: Georges Jameau (France)

In this match Jim Mills, the Wales prop, was banned for the rest of the season after an altercation. The ban was eventually lifted on 2 January 1976.

6 November

Wales	23 – 2	France

The Willows, Salford
Attendance: 2,247
Referee: Fred Lindop (England)

=== Final standings ===
Team	Pld	W	D	L	PF	PA	PD	Pts
Australia	8	6	1	1	198	69	+129	13
England	8	5	2	1	167	84	+83	12
Wales	8	3	0	5	110	130	−20	6
New Zealand	8	2	2	4	121	149	−28	6
France	8	1	1	6	40	204	−164	3

=== Final challenge match ===
As Australia had not beaten England to win the World Cup (a draw and a loss), a one off challenge match was arranged, although this was not officially classed as a Final as Australia had already been crowned Champions after topping the group.

The Kangaroos showed they were worthy World Champions with a comprehensive 25–0 win at Headingley in front of a disappointing crowd of 7,680 which was over 11,000 less than had attended the 1970 World Cup final, between Great Britain and Australia, at the same venue. England had shown little interest in playing the game.

12 November

England	0 – 25	Australia

Headingley, Leeds
Attendance: 7,680
Referee: Fred Lindop (England)

== Try scorers ==
7

- (Australia) Ian Schubert
- (England) Keith Fielding

5

- (Australia) Mick Cronin

4

- (Australia) Bob Fulton
- (England) Ken Gill
- (England) John Holmes
- (Wales) Bill Francis

3

- (Australia) Mark Harris
- (Australia) Graeme Langlands
- (Australia) John Peard
- (Australia) Terry Randall
- (England) Ged Dunn
- (England) Eric Hughes
- (New Zealand) Bob Jarvis
- (New Zealand) Phillip Orchard

2

- (Australia) Ray Higgs
- (Australia) John Lang
- (Australia) Lew Platz
- (Australia) Tommy Raudonikis
- (Australia) Steve Rogers
- (France) Patrick Chauvet
- (England) George Fairbairn
- (New Zealand) Tony Gordon
- (New Zealand) Ken Stirling
- (New Zealand) Dennis Williams
- (Wales) Peter Banner
- (Wales) John Bevan
- (Wales) David Willicombe

1

- (Australia) Ray Branighan
- (Australia) Graham Eadie
- (Australia) Tim Pickup
- (Australia) John Quayle
- (Australia) Johnny Rhodes
- (England) John Atkinson
- (England) Colin Forsyth
- (England) Jeff Grayshon
- (England) Brian Hogan
- (England) Thomas Martyn
- (England) Roger Millward
- (England) Mick Morgan
- (England) Steve Norton
- (England) Stuart Wright
- (France) Bernard Curt
- (France) René Terrats
- (New Zealand) Tony Coll
- (New Zealand) Tom Conroy
- (New Zealand) Murray Eade
- (New Zealand) John Greengrass
- (New Zealand) Lyndsay Proctor
- (New Zealand) John Smith
- (New Zealand) John Whittaker
- (Wales) Kel Coslett
- (Wales) Tony Fisher
- (Wales) Brian Gregory
- (Wales) John Mantle
- (Wales) Jim Mills
- (Wales) Clive Sullivan
- (Wales) David Treasure
- (Wales) Frank Wilson
