= Jep Lacoste =

France international rugby league & league player andcoach

Personal information
- Born: André Marius Lacoste; 11 February 1922 Toulouse, France
- Died: 22 June 1988 (aged 66) Villeneuve-sur-Lot, France

Playing information
Club
Years	Team	Pld	T	G	FG	P
	Villeneuve-sur-Lot	0	0	0	0	0

Coaching information

Rugby league
Club
Years	Team	Gms	W	D	L	W%
1962–66	Villeneuve-sur-Lot	0	0	0	0
19??–??	Saint-Gaudens	0	0	0	0
1973–76	Villeneuve-sur-Lot	0	0	0	0
	Total	0	0	0	0
Representative
Years	Team	Gms	W	D	L	W%
1964–72	France	17	5	1	11	29

Rugby union
Club
Years	Team	Gms	W	D	L	W%
19??–??	Périgueux	0	0	0	0
19??–??	Valence d'Agen	0	0	0	0
	Total	0	0	0	0
- As of 11 March 2021

André Marius Lacoste, known as Jep Lacoste (11 February 1922 – 22 June 1988) was a French rugby league coach.

== Biography ==
Lacoste, originally a player of Villeneuve-sur-Lot, his playing career was compromised due to his STO in Upper Silesia, which left him physically dilapidated. Lacoste was the coach of his former club, Villeneuve-sur-Lot, which he led to a historic double in the 1964–65 season, as well he coached France at the 1968 Rugby League World Cup. Lacoste also coached the Saint-Gaudens side which won the French Championship final in the 1969–70 season against XIII Catalan.

After his death in 1988, a rugby sevens tournament with 12 rugby league teams and two rugby union teams from south-west France, was inaugurated by the then-president of the French Rugby League Federation, Puig Aubert, with the name "Jep Lacoste Trophy" in his honour.

== Honours ==
- Rugby league :
- World Cup :
  - Runner-up in 1968 (France).
- French Championship :
  - Champion in 1964 (Villeneuve-sur-Lot).
  - Champion in 1970 (Saint-Gaudens).
  - Runner-up in 1965 and 1974 (Villeneuve-sur-Lot).
- Lord Derby Cup :
  - Champion in 1964 (Villeneuve-sur-Lot).
  - Runner-up in 1966 (Villeneuve-sur-Lot).
