= Billy Smith (rugby league, born 1942) =

Australian rugby league footballer and coach (1942–2026)

Personal information
- Full name: William John Smith
- Born: 12 July 1942 Fremantle, Western Australia, Australia
- Died: 20 August 2026 (aged 84)

Playing information
- Position: Halfback
Club
Years	Team	Pld	T	G	FG	P
1961–1977	St. George Dragons	234	30	3	44	161
Representative
Years	Team	Pld	T	G	FG	P
1964–1973	New South Wales	17	1	1	0	5
1964–1970	Australia	26	3	0	0	9

William John Smith (12 July 1942 – 20 August 2026) was an Australian rugby league footballer. He was the leading halfback in Australian rugby league during the late 1960s, and a keystone of the latter part of the St. George Dragons' eleven consecutive premiership victories between 1956 and 1966. He represented Australia in eighteen Tests and eight World Cup games between 1964 and 1970. He captained Australia in a World Cup game against Great Britain in 1970.

== Early life ==
Born in Fremantle, Western Australia, the son of a Scottish fisherman, Smith grew up in Mortdale, New South Wales in the St George area. After playing soccer, rugby union and Australian rules football, he took to junior league early playing with Mortdale and the Renown club. He starred in his junior football, was spotted by St. George talent scouts and was first graded at age 16. He played in third grade in 1959 for the Dragons before his father objected and he returned to Renown for two more seasons in the juniors.

== Club career ==
Smith returned to St. George in 1960 as a centre. After a few games in 1961 and 1962 he established a permanent place in 1963 when Reg Gasnier's first and second-choice partners (Johnny Riley and Dave Brown) were both forced out by injury. Billy Smith went on to play fifteen seasons at St. George Dragons between 1963 and 1977.

In 1964, Smith was shifted to halfback and adapted quickly under Norm Provan's coaching and on-field practice. His was a pivotal member of the Dragons' Premiership winning sides of 1963, 1964, 1965 and 1966. In 1966 he was named New South Wales Player of the year and won The Sun-Herald's Best and Fairest Player award.

By 1967, the St George side had lost many of its stars and all of its pack of fearsome forwards. Smith's abilities and his uncanny partnership with Graeme Langlands are credited with enabling the club to remain competitive through to the mid seventies.

Due to injury he missed the first half of the 1971 season. His three vital field goals in the final won St. George a place in the 1971 Grand Final where they were beaten by South Sydney.

Halfway through 1972 he was injured and played in third grade when he returned. By 1976, Smith was suffering from severe leg problems and his previously brilliant kicking game was gone. He captained the reserve grade side to a Grand Final win in 1976 and spent most of 1977 in reserve grade. At the end of the 1977 season, he was cut from the club after a prank on a sponsor's bus trip to the Penfolds Vineyard went wrong. Smith was 35 and had played a record 296 games in all grades with St. George – the club's standing record.

He was awarded Life Membership of the St. George Dragons in 1973.

== Playing style ==
Small in size compared to most rugby league players, Smith was renowned for his toughness. He was capable of challenging any opponent head-on on the field, and his organising and kicking skills were a vital part of St. George's success during his career.

Legendary rugby league hardman John Sattler is quoted as follows in the Writer reference:

People talk about the enforcers in the game, but Langlands and his mate Smithy were the toughest of the tough because they could play with injury – arm hanging off, crook leg, strap 'em up and send 'em out – and they could perform. And they had such club spirit. They were knockabouts and larrikins off the paddock, but they respected their club and teammates and treated Frank Facer like their own father."

== Representative career ==
Smith made his Test debut against France in 1964 in his first season as a halfback. In 1966 Smith won the Harry Sunderland Medal when Australia retained the Ashes at home for the first time. His tackling of the heavyweight English forwards was the decisive factor in this win, and was praised heartily by the press. For the next five years Smith missed (due to injury) only one Test match in which Australia was involved.

In 1967 Smith won the Harry Sunderland Medal again (this time for his performance against New Zealand) and was an automatic selection for the Kangaroo tour later that year. He played in five Tests and ten minor tour matches but misbehaviour on that tour threatened his international career. He was however chosen in Australia's World cup squad in 1968, toured New Zealand in 1969 and was picked against Great Britain in 1970 for all three Tests of the domestic Ashes series.

In spite of having been fined half his 1967-68 tour bonus, when it came time to pick the 1970 World Cup squad, Smith was selected as vice-captain and, after injury to captain Ron Coote, Smith enjoyed the honour of leading his country in a tournament match against Great Britain at Headingley in October 1970 in which he was also named as man-of-the-match.

He featured in Australia's 1970 World Cup Final (the "Battle of Leeds") won 12–7 and was sent off in the 78th minute. Further injuries prevented Smith retaining his Test spot despite his 110% effort every time he took the field.

All up Smith appeared in seven Tests against Britain, five against New Zealand and six against France. He appeared in eight matches across the 1968 and 1970 World Cups. He is listed on the Australian Players Register as Kangaroo No. 392.

== Coaching and post-playing accolades ==
After Smith retired as a player, he joined former Dragon teammate Norm Provan as an assistant coach with Cronulla-Sutherland Sharks. Provan took the Sharks to the grand final in 1978, only to be crushed in a replay by the unstoppable Graham Eadie, and to third at the end of the 1979 home-and-away season. Smith concurrently coached the Cronulla-Sutherland Sharks reserve grade side to two grand finals in 1978 and 1979. It was thought in 1979 that Smith would be likely to succeed Provan, his former captain, mentor and long-time friend, as Cronulla first-grade coach, but he resigned controversially after a preliminary semi-final thrashing by Parramatta. Provan would be succeeded by Tommy Bishop, under whom in 1980 Cronulla fell to ninth with only four wins in their final fifteen matches.

Smith was named in Australia's best team from 1970 to 1985 by Rugby League Week, and gained two votes in 1995 as best halfback of the limited-tackle era.

In February 2008, Smith was named in the list of Australia's 100 Greatest Players (1908–2007) which was commissioned by the NRL and ARL to celebrate the code's centenary year in Australia. On 20 July 2022, Smith was named in the St. George Dragons District Rugby League Club's team of the century at halfback.

== Death ==
Smith died on 20 August 2026 at the BUPA Sutherland nursing home, at the age of 84.

== Notes ==
Sporting positions
Preceded by Ron Coote	Captain Australia; 1970	Succeeded by Bob McCarthy
