= Ron Coote =

Australia international rugby league footballer

Personal information
- Full name: Ronald Joseph Coote
- Born: 25 October 1944 (age 82) Kingsford, New South Wales, Australia

Playing information
- Position: Lock, Second-row
Club
Years	Team	Pld	T	G	FG	P
1964–71	South Sydney	148	48	0	0	144
1972–78	Eastern Suburbs	109	39	0	0	117
	Total	257	87	0	0	261
Representative
Years	Team	Pld	T	G	FG	P
1965–75	New South Wales	15	6	0	0	18
1967–75	Australia	23	13	0	0	21
- Father: Jack Coote

Ronald Joseph Coote AM (born 1944) is an Australian former rugby league footballer. His club career was played with South Sydney and the Eastern Suburbs Roosters, with both of whom he won premierships, and he played 23 times for Australia. He is considered one of the nation's finest footballers of the 20th century, and was inducted as the 14th Immortal in 2024. The Ron Coote Cup, contested annually by South Sydney Rabbitohs and the Sydney Roosters is named in his honour - his entire club career having been played at these two clubs.

== Early life and playing style ==
Born in Kingsford, New South Wales in 1944 Coote was a South Sydney junior and the son of 1930s Easts forward Jack Coote. He was a tall, rangy lock with an upright running style. He was famous for his outstanding cover defence and low, "round-the-legs" tackling technique. He was bestowed the name "Prince of Locks" acknowledging him as the second greatest Australian lock ever, behind the "King of Locks" Johnny Raper.

== Club and representative career ==
He played 151 games for South Sydney from 1964 to 1971 and 108 games for Eastern Suburbs from 1972 to 1978. With both clubs enjoying success during his tenure, Coote's Grand Final record is phenomenal. He played in nine Grand Finals in 11 seasons from 1965 to 1975. He won four premierships at Souths and consecutive premierships at Easts in season 1974 and season 1975. An arm injury forced him into retirement in 1978.

He represented Australia in 23 Tests and World Cup games between 1967 and 1975 and was captain for 3 games in the 1970 World Cup.

== Post playing and accolades ==
After football, Coote became a successful businessman owning a number of McDonald's franchises. He was at one time a member of the New South Wales Rugby League (NSWRL) judiciary. In 2000, he founded the Men of League program (now Family of League) which supports former players, officials and referees who have fallen on hard times. The program offers practical assistance and grants for medical operations; it mentors players about to retire from the game and promotes the game in regional areas.

In 2004, he was named by Souths in their South Sydney Dream Team, consisting of 17 players and a coach representing the club from 1908 through to 2004, Coote has also been named in a team comprising Eastern Suburbs greatest ever players.

In 2005 he was inducted into the Australian Rugby League Hall of Fame. In February 2008, Coote was named in the list of Australia's 100 Greatest Players (1908–2007) which was commissioned by the NRL and ARL to celebrate the code's centenary year in Australia. Coote went on to be named in the second-row in Australian rugby league's Team of the Century. Announced on 17 April 2008, the team is the panel's majority choice for each of the thirteen starting positions and four interchange players. In 2008 New South Wales announced their rugby league team of the century also and again Coote was named at second-row.

Coote was made a life member of the Sydney Cricket Ground and a plaque in the Walk of Honour there commemorates his career. He is a Member of the Order of Australia (AM).

Coote's house at Lake Conjola was destroyed in the 2019–20 Australian bushfire season.

He was inducted as the game's 14th Immortal on 21 August, 2024.

Preceded by Phil Hawthorne	Australian national rugby league captain 1970	Succeeded by Billy Smith
