= Carlaw Park =

Stadium in New Zealand

Coordinates: 36°51′13″S 174°46′33″E

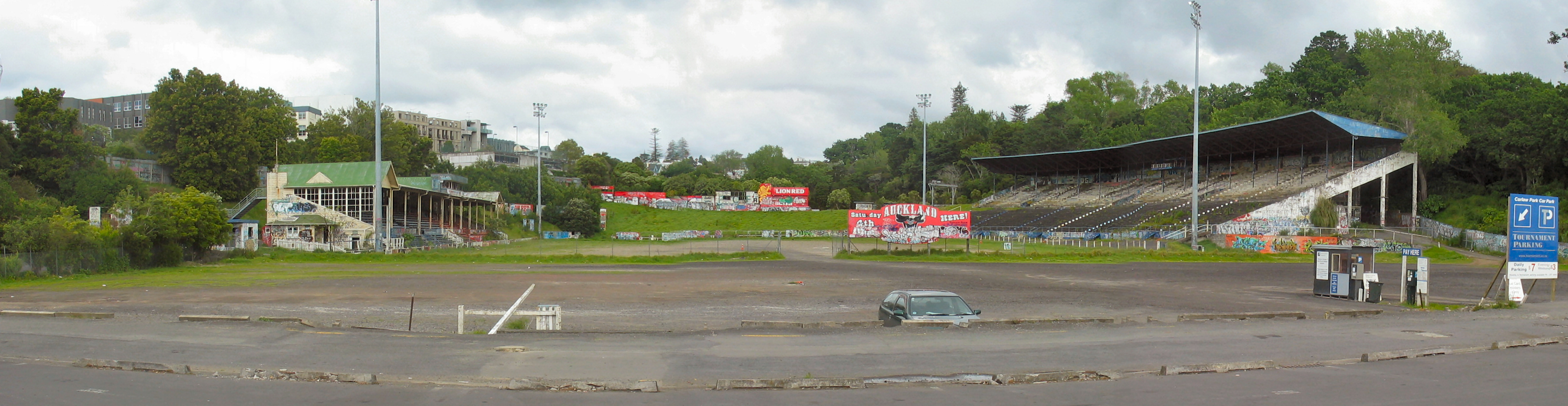
Carlaw Park in November 2006, in use as a carpark

Carlaw Park was a multi-purpose stadium in Parnell, a central suburb of Auckland, New Zealand. It neighboured the Auckland Domain's Northern end. It was primarily used for rugby league and had a peak spectator capacity of around 28,000 in the 1930s, though this fell to around 17,000 by the time the ground was closed in 2002. It is now the site of several offices and the University of Auckland's largest student accommodation Carlaw Park Student Village.

== History ==
The stadium's grandstands and terraces were built in 1916, and it became the home of rugby league in Auckland from 1921. It was named after James Carlaw, the chairman of the Auckland Rugby League managing committee who secured the land in 1920 and developed the ground further.

The ground was officially opened on 25 June 1921 and City Rovers defeated Maritime 10–8 on the opening day in front of 7,000 fans. Herb Lunn scored the first try and Eric Grey kicked the first goal on the ground.

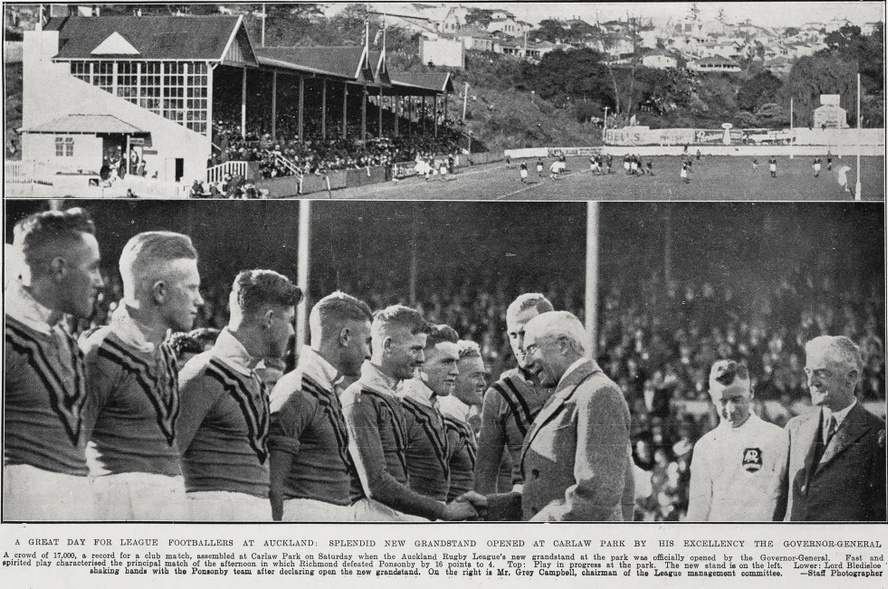
Lord Bledisloe meeting the Ponsonby players before their match with Richmond on the day the new grandstand was opened on May 12, 1934.

The ground hosted the sole test match in the New Zealand leg of the 1951 French rugby league tour of Australasia.

The Auckland Rugby League spent £4,322 on capital expenditure in developing the ground. The ground was purchased for $200,000 in 1974.

The ground hosted 3 Winfield Cup games (one in 1992 the two other games were held in 1993) with the first game between Newcastle and Manly Warringah attracting 17,368 spectators. Strong attendances across these matches led to the inclusion of the Auckland Warriors into the Winfield Cup in 1995.

During its long history it hosted many matches in various Rugby League World Cups. The stadium capacity was officially listed as 17,000 when it closed in 2002 due to health and safety reasons. Between 1924 and 1999 Carlaw Park hosted sixty-six Test matches. The largest Test crowd was an estimated 28,000 during the 1928 England tour. New Zealand won the game, defeating England 17–13. The final rugby league test at the ground came on 22 October 1999 when New Zealand defeated Tonga 74–0 in front of the ground's lowest ever test crowd of 4,528.

== Later years ==
In August 2006 the Auckland Rugby League reached an agreement to lease the property off to be developed as a retirement home. No development has started as of August 2007. However the site has been officially 'handed over' in August 2007 in a ceremony involving Prime Minister Helen Clark.

Carlaw Park was one of the venues under consideration for Stadium New Zealand, a proposed stadium to host the 2011 Rugby World Cup. Complications over the lease of the property, the requirement for additional land to be taken from Auckland Domain, and the proximity of the heavy traffic on Stanley Street led to other options being preferred by the Government. The backers of Carlaw Park hosting the Cup secured NZ$200 million for its possible development, but the government finally chose Eden Park to host the World Cup games.

Carlaw Park is now the site of several offices, a Quest Apartments hotel building, and the University of Auckland's largest student accommodation Carlaw Park Student Village. Since mid-November 2018, Carlaw Park has been connected by a walkway to the Parnell railway station.

== Rugby league test matches ==
List of rugby league test matches played at Carlaw Park.

Test#	Date	Result	Attendance
1	2 August 1924	New Zealand def. England 16-8	22,000
2	4 August 1928	New Zealand def. England 17-13	28,000
3	30 July 1932	England def. New Zealand 24-9	25,000
4	20 August 1932	England def. New Zealand 20-18	6,500
5	28 September 1935	New Zealand def. Australia 22-14	20,000
6	2 October 1935	Australia def. New Zealand 29-8	8,000
7	4 October 1935	Australia def. New Zealand 31-8	20,000
8	8 August 1936	England def. New Zealand 10-8	25,000
9	15 August 1936	England def. New Zealand 23-11	17,000
10	7 August 1937	Australia def. New Zealand 12-8	12,000
11	14 August 1937	New Zealand def. Australia 16-15	25,000
12	10 August 1946	New Zealand def. England 13-8	11,000
13	8 October 1949	Australia def. New Zealand 13-10	12,361
14	12 August 1950	New Zealand def. Great Britain 20-13	20,000
15	4 August 1951	New Zealand def. France 16-15	19,229
16	18 July 1953	Australia def. New Zealand 18-16	16,033
17	24 July 1954	Great Britain def. New Zealand 27-7	22,097
18	14 August 1954	Great Britain def. New Zealand 12-6	6,186
19	6 August 1955	France def. New Zealand 19-9	20,500
20	13 August 1955	New Zealand def. France 11-6	12,000
21	26 July 1958	New Zealand def. Great Britain 15-10	25,000
22	9 August 1958	Great Britain def. New Zealand 32-15	25,000
23	23 July 1960	New Zealand def. France 9-2	17,914
24	6 August 1960	New Zealand def. France 9-3	14,007
25	1 July 1961	New Zealand def. Australia 12-10	11,485
26	8 July 1961	Australia def. New Zealand 10-8	12,424
27	23 July 1962	New Zealand def. Great Britain 19-0	14,976
28	10 August 1962	South Africa def. New Zealand 4-3	
29	11 August 1962	New Zealand def. Great Britain 27-8	16,411
30	25 July 1964	New Zealand def. France 24-16	10,148
31	15 August 1964	New Zealand def. France 10-2	7,279
32	19 June 1965	Australia def. New Zealand 13-8	13,205
33	26 June 1965	New Zealand def. Australia 7-5	11,383
34	6 August 1966	Great Britain def. New Zealand 25-8	14,494
35	20 August 1966	Great Britain def. New Zealand 22-14	10,657
36	1 June 1969	Australia def. New Zealand 20-10	13,459
37	7 June 1969	New Zealand def. Australia 18-14	9,848
38	11 July 1970	Great Britain def. New Zealand 19-15	15,948
39	25 July 1970	Great Britain def. New Zealand 33-16	13,137
40	26 June 1971	New Zealand def. Australia 24-3	13,917
41	27 July 1974	New Zealand def. Great Britain 13-8	10,466
42	10 August 1974	Great Britain def. New Zealand 20-0	11,574
43	21 July 1979	Great Britain def. New Zealand 16-8	9,000
44	11 August 1979	New Zealand def. Great Britain 18-11	7,000
45	1 June 1980	Australia def. New Zealand 27-6	12,321
46	15 June 1980	Australia def. New Zealand 15-6	9,706
47	7 June 1981	New Zealand def. France 26-3	12,200
48	21 June 1981	New Zealand def. France 25-2	8,100
49	12 June 1983	Australia def. New Zealand 16-4	18,000
50	2 October 1983	New Zealand def. Papua New Guinea 60-20	7,000
51	14 July 1984	New Zealand def. Great Britain 12-0	10,238
52	28 July 1984	New Zealand def. Great Britain 32-16	7,967
53	30 June 1985	Australia def. New Zealand 10-6	19,132
54	7 July 1985	New Zealand def. Australia 18-0	15,327
55	6 July 1986	Australia def. New Zealand 22-8	14,566
56	13 June 1991	New Zealand def. France 60-6	7,000
57	22 October 1999	New Zealand def. Tonga 74-0	4,528

== Rugby League World Cup ==
List of Rugby League World Cup matches played at Carlaw Park.
Results are from the 1968, 1975, 1977 and 1985–1988 World Cups.

WC Game#	Date	Result	Attendance
1	25 May 1968	France def. New Zealand 15-10	18,000
2	2 June 1968	France def. Great Britain 7-2	15,760
3	21 June 1975	New Zealand drew with England 17-17	12,000
4	21 June 1975	New Zealand def. Wales 13-8	9,368
5	27 September 1975	Australia def. New Zealand 24-8	18,000
6	29 May 1977	Australia def. New Zealand 27-12	18,000
7	5 June 1977	Great Britain def. France 23-4	10,000
8	19 June 1977	New Zealand def. France 28-20	8,000
9	10 July 1988	New Zealand def. Papua New Guinea 66-14	8,392
