= 1970 Rugby League World Cup =

Fifth Rugby League World Cup tournament

1970 World Cup
- Number of teams: 4
- Host country: United Kingdom
- Winner: Australia (3rd title)
- Matches played: 7
- Attendance: 68,710 (9,816 per match)
- Points scored: 205 (29.29 per match)
- Top scorer: (Australia) Eric Simms (37)
- Top try scorer: (Australia) John Cootes (5)

1970 Rugby League World Cup was the fifth World Cup for men's National rugby league teams. Held between 27 October and 7 November and hosted in England. It was won by Australia who defeated Great Britain in the final.

After winning the tournament, the Australian team put the World Cup trophy on display in the Midland Hotel in Bradford. From there it was stolen and remained unseen for the next 20 years.

== Venues ==
Headingley in Leeds hosted a group game between Great Britain and Australia and also hosted the World Cup final.

Leeds	Wigan	Bradford
Headingley	Central Park	Odsal Stadium
Capacity: 30,000	Capacity: 40,000	Capacity: 40,000
Swinton	Hull	Castleford
Station Road	The Boulevard	Wheldon Road
Capacity: 35,000	Capacity: 16,000	Capacity: 15,000

== Results ==
21 October

Australia	47 – 11	New Zealand

Central Park, Wigan
Attendance: 9,805

Australia beat the Kiwis easily at Wigan in the opening fixture with Eric Simms repeating his form of the 1968 tourney by landing a record ten goals.

24 October

Great Britain	11 – 4	Australia

Headingley, Leeds
Attendance: 15,084

Britain came from 0–4 behind to defeat Australia 11–4 at Headingley with Syd Hynes scoring the game's only try.

25 October

France	15 – 16	New Zealand

The Boulevard, Hull
Attendance: 3,824

The try of the tournament was scored by the sensational French winger Serge Marsolan against New Zealand in a mud-bath at Hull. Marsolan ran from behind his own line for a try fit to win any match but the lackadaisical French lost 15–16.

28 October

Great Britain	6 – 0	France

Wheldon Road, Castleford
Attendance: 8,958

The French put up a great fight against Britain in vile conditions, only to lose 0–6 at Castleford to three penalties from Ray Dutton.

31 October

Great Britain	27 – 17	New Zealand

Station Road, Swinton
Attendance: 5,609

Britain eliminated New Zealand from the tournament, cruising to victory with five tries to three.

1 November

Australia	15 – 17	France

Odsal Stadium, Bradford
Attendance: 6,654

This game has been described as incredibly exciting and the tournament's piece de resistance. Aussie centre Bobby Fulton scored a try within seconds of the kick-off – probably the quickest ever in international matches. However, with ten minutes to go and the scores level at 15–15, the French stole the game when stand-off half Jean Capdouze dropped a monster goal. The Kangaroos' loss to France meant it was Australia's superior points differential (on the back of their pointsfest in the opening game against New Zealand) alone that got them into the final with the undefeated Great Britain team.

=== Table ===
Team	Pld	W	D	L	PF	PA	PD	Pts	Qualification
Great Britain	3	3	0	0	44	21	+23	6	Qualified for the World Cup final
Australia	3	1	0	2	66	39	+27	2	Qualified for the World Cup final
France	3	1	0	2	32	37	−5	2	
New Zealand	3	1	0	2	44	89	−45	2	

=== Final ===
Having retained the Ashes, Great Britain were favourites to win the World Cup's final,

7 November 1970

Great Britain	7–12	Australia
Tries: John Atkinson Goals: Ray Dutton (1); Field Goal: Syd Hynes		Tries: John Cootes; Lionel Williamson; Goals: Eric Simms (2); Field Goal: Eric Simms

Headingley, Leeds
Attendance: 18,776
Referee: Fred Lindop (United Kingdom)

Great Britain	Australia

FB	1	Ray Dutton
RW	2	Alan Smith
RC	3	Syd Hynes
LC	4	Frank Myler (c)
LW	5	John Atkinson
SO	6	Mick Shoebottom
SH	7	Keith Hepworth
PR	8	Dennis Hartley
HK	9	Tony Fisher
PR	10	Cliff Watson
SR	11	Jimmy Thompson
SR	12	Doug Laughton
LF	13	Mal Reilly
Substitutions:
IC	14	Chris Hesketh
IC	15	Bob Haigh
Coach:
(England) Johnny Whiteley

FB	1	Eric Simms
RW	2	Lionel Williamson
RC	3	John Cootes
LC	4	Paul Sait
LW	5	Mark Harris
FE	6	Bob Fulton
HB	7	Billy Smith
PR	8	John O'Neill
HK	9	Ron Turner
PR	10	Bob O'Reilly
SR	11	Bob McCarthy
SR	12	Ron Costello
LK	13	Ron Coote (c)
Substitutions:
IC	14	Ray Branighan
IC	15	Elwyn Walters
Coach:
(Australia) Harry Bath

The match, which would become known as the 'Battle of Headingley' due to its brutality went completely against expectations as Britain failed to play any decent football despite overwhelming possession. The Kangaroos led 5–4 at half-time with a try to Australian three-quarter, Father John Cootes. They went on to utilise their meagre chances to the full, running out 12–7 victors. The game itself was violent, although it was not until the final minute that Billy Smith of Australia, who had earlier kicked out at a scrum, and Syd Hynes of Great Britain were sent off.

== Try scorers ==
5

- (Australia) John Cootes

4

- (France) Serge Marsolan

2

- (Australia) Bob Fulton
- (United Kingdom) John Atkinson
- (United Kingdom) Syd Hynes
- (New Zealand) Garry Smith

1

- (Australia) Ray Branighan
- (Australia) Ron Coote
- (Australia) Bob McCarthy
- (Australia) Eric Simms
- (Australia) Billy Smith
- (Australia) Ron Turner
- (Australia) Lionel Williamson
- (France) Élie Bonal
- (France) Jean Capdouze
- (United Kingdom) Chris Hesketh
- (United Kingdom) Doug Laughton
- (United Kingdom) Cliff Watson
- (New Zealand) Mocky Brereton
- (New Zealand) Roy Christian
- (New Zealand) Graeme Cooksley
- (New Zealand) Tony Kriletich
