= 1969 Kangaroo tour of New Zealand =

1969 rugby league tour

- Manager: Eddie Burns; Jack Lynch
- Coach(es): Harry Bath
- Tour captain(s): John Sattler
- Top point scorer(s): Les Johns 42
- Top try scorer(s): Dennis Manteit 5
- Top test point scorer(s): Les Johns 14; Don Ladner 22
- Top test try scorer(s): Ron Coote 3
Summary
P	W	D	L
Total
6	4	0	2
Test match
2	1	0	1
Opponent
P	W	D	L
New Zealand
2	1	0	1

Tour chronology
- Previous tour: 1965 by to 1967 by to 1967-68 to 1968 by to
- Next tour: 1970 by to 1971 by to

The 1969 Kangaroo Tour of New Zealand was a mid-season tour of New Zealand by the Australia national rugby league team. The Australians played six matches on tour, including two tests against the New Zealand national rugby league team. The tour began on 28 May and finished on 10 June.

== Leadership ==
Harry Bath coached the Kangaroos side throughout the tour. South Sydney's John Sattler captained the side. In the two matches in which Sattler did not play, the team was captained by Les Johns (against Wellington) and John McDonald against Auckland.
The touring team was co-managed by Eddie Burns (Canterbury, NSW) and Jack Lynch (Ipswich, Qld).

== Touring squad ==
The Rugby League News published details of the touring team including the players' ages and weights. A team photo was published during the tour.
Match details - listing surnames of both teams and the point scorers - were included in E.E. Christensen's Official Rugby League Yearbook, as was a summary of the players' point-scoring.
Denman, Fitzsimmons, Manteit, Robson and Weiss were selected from Queensland clubs. Cootes, Costello and Lye were selected from clubs in New South Wales Country areas. The balance of the squad were playing for Sydney based clubs during the 1969 season.

Player	Position	Age	Weight st.lb (kg)	Club	Tests on Tour	Games	Tries	Goals	FG	Points
Michael Cleary	Wing	29	14.0 (89)	South Sydney	0	2	4	0	0	12
Ron Coote	Lock	24	14.3 (90)	South Sydney	2	5	4	0	0	12
John Cootes	Wing	27	13.10 (87)	Newcastle Western Suburbs	2	4	3	2	0	13
Ron Costello	Second-row	26	14.1 (89)	C.B.C. Wollongong	1	4	2	0	0	6
Jeff Denman	Wing	26	12.0 (76)	Brisbane Eastern Suburbs	0	3	0	0	0	0
Brian Fitzsimmons	Hooker	26	12.8 (80)	Glastone Brothers	0	3	0	0	0	0
Bob Honan	Wing	25	12.7 (79)	South Sydney	2	6	1	0	0	3
Les Johns	Fullback	27	12.0 (76)	Canterbury	2	4	0	19	2	42
Graeme Langlands	Centre	27	13.0 (83)	St George	2	5	0	3	0	6
Graham Lye	Five-eighth	21	11.12 (75)	Illawarra Western Suburbs	0	3	0	0	0	0
Dennis Manteit	Prop	26	15.4 (97)	Brisbane Brothers	0	3	5	0	0	15
Bob McCarthy	Second-row	24	15.3 (97)	South Sydney	2	4	1	0	0	3
John McDonald	Centre	24	13.0 (83)	Manly-Warringah	2	5	2	0	0	6
Denis Pittard	Five-eighth	22	11.6 (73)	South Sydney	2	4	1	0	0	3
Ian Robson	Second-row	21	15.0 (95)	Brisbane Western Suburbs	0	2	0	0	0	0
John Sattler (c)	Prop	26	14.8 (93)	South Sydney	2	4	1	0	0	3
Elwyn Walters	Hooker	24	13.11 (88)	South Sydney	2	4	0	0	0	0
Dennis Ward	Halfback	24	10.10 (68)	Manly-Warringah	2	5	1	0	2	7
Col Weiss	Second-row	25	12.7 (79)	Bundaberg	1	5	1	0	0	3
John Wittenberg	Prop	30	15.3 (97)	St George	2	5	1	0	0	3

== Tour ==
The Australians played six matches on the tour, winning the first four before losing the final two.

Wednesday 28 May

North Island Colts	13 – 17	Australia
	Report; Database

Rotorua International Stadium, Rotorua
Attendance: 953

=== First test ===
Sunday 1 June

New Zealand	10 – 20	Australia
Tries: Goals: Don Ladner (5/5)	Team; Report; Database	Tries: Ron Coote (2); John Cootes; Denis Pittard; Goals: Les Johns (4/4)

Carlaw Park, Auckland
Attendance: 13,459
Referee: John Percival (New Zealand)

New Zealand

FB	1	Don Ladner
RW	2	Dennis Key
CE	3	John Wilson
CE	4	Sam Rolleston
LW	5	Mocky Brereton
FE	6	Trevor Patrick
HB	7	Graeme Cooksley
PR	8	Oscar Danielson
HK	9	Colin O'Neil (c)
PR	10	Bill Noonan
SR	11	John Hibbs
SR	12	Tony Kriletich
LF	13	Rodney Walker
Coach:
(New Zealand) Lory Blanchard

Australia

FB	1	Les Johns
RW	2	John Cootes
CE	3	Graeme Langlands
CE	4	John McDonald
LW	5	Bob Honan
FE	6	Denis Pittard
HB	7	Dennis Ward
PR	8	John Wittenberg
HK	9	Elwyn Walters
PR	10	John Sattler (c)
SR	11	Ron Costello
SR	12	Bob McCarthy
LF	13	Ron Coote
Coach:
(Australia) Harry Bath

Monday 2 June

South Island	15 – 24	Australia
	Report; Database

Addington Showgrounds, Christchurch
Attendance: 3,376

Wednesday 4 June

Wellington	7 – 48	Australia
	Team; Report; Database

Basin Reserve, Wellington
Attendance: 1,415

=== Second test ===
Saturday 7 June

New Zealand	18 – 14	Australia
Tries: Bill Noonan; Phil Orchard; Goals: Don Ladner (5/5); Field goals: Don Ladner (1)	Team; Report; Database	Tries: Ron Coote; Robert McCarthy; Goals: Les Johns (4/4)

Carlaw Park, Auckland
Attendance: 9,848
Referee: John Percival (New Zealand)

New Zealand

FB	1	Don Ladner
RW	2	Phillip Orchard
CE	3	Mocky Brereton
CE	4	Brian Clark
LW	5	Roy Christian
FE	6	Gary Woollard
HB	7	Graeme Cooksley
PR	8	Oscar Danielson
HK	9	Colin O'Neil (c)
PR	10	Doug Gailey
SR	11	Bill Deacon
SR	12	Bill Noonan
LF	13	Tony Kriletich
Coach:
(New Zealand) Lory Blanchard

Australia

FB	1	Les Johns
RW	2	Bob Honan
CE	3	Graeme Langlands
CE	4	John McDonald
LW	5	John Cootes
FE	6	Denis Pittard
HB	7	Dennis Ward
PR	8	John Sattler (c)
HK	9	Elwyn Walters
PR	10	John Wittenberg
SR	11	Bob McCarthy
SR	12	Col Weiss
LF	13	Ron Coote
Coach:
(Australia) Harry Bath

Tuesday 10 June

Auckland	15 – 14	Australia
	Teams; Report; Database

Carlaw Park, Auckland
Attendance: 6,520
