= 1969 New Zealand rugby league season =

Seasons
- 1968 1970

The 1969 New Zealand rugby league season was the 62nd season of rugby league that had been played in New Zealand.

== International competitions ==
New Zealand drew 1-all with Australia. New Zealand included Don Ladner, Phillip Orchard, Roy Christian, Brian Clark, Mocky Brereton, Gary Woollard, Graeme Cooksley, Oscar Danielson, captain Colin O'Neil, Doug Gailey, Bill Deacon, Bill Noonan and Tony Kriletich.

Australia defeated a North Island colts side 17-13 before defeating the South Island 24–15 at the Show Grounds. The South Island included Bill Johnsen, Bob Irvine, Gary Clarke and Angus Thompson.

Australia then defeated Wellington 48-7 before beaten by Auckland 14–15 at Carlaw Park. During the game referee Earle Pilcher collided with Kangaroo Col Weiss and was knocked out, also suffering a broken neck. This occurred as Auckland were racing away to score a would be try, only to have no one able to award it. Auckland team: John Young; John Sparnon, Roy Christian, Paul Schultz, Mike McClennan; Gary Woollard, Eric Carson; Doug Gailey, Bill Burgoyne, Victor Yates (replaced by Tony Kriletich), Eddie Moore, Ernie Wiggs, Ray Sinel.

In a special fixture to mark the New Zealand Rugby League's diamond jubilee, a match was played between Auckland and New Zealand at Carlaw Park in front of 12,000 fans. Ernie Asher was present at the match and carried out the ceremonial kick-off. Auckland included Australians John Raper, Phil Hawthorne and Dick Thornett as guest players.

The Colin O'Neil won the New Zealand Rugby League's player of the year award.

New Zealand Universities Rugby League team also toured Australia where they played 3 tests against the Australian Universities team.

== National competitions ==
=== Rugby League Cup ===
West Coast held the Rugby League Cup at the end of the season, after defeating Canterbury 23–19 at the Show Grounds to win the trophy and then defending it 14–2 in Greymouth. During the year the Northern Union Cup was renamed the Rugby League Cup.

=== Inter-zone competition ===
Southern Zone defeated Northern Zone 13–12. The Southern Zone included Graeme Cooksley and Rodney Walker.

=== Inter-district competition ===
Auckland won the Rothmans trophy, defeating Canterbury 48–16 in the final at Carlaw Park.

Auckland included Len Morgan, Bland Liles, Henry Tatana, Bob Mincham, captain Roger Bailey, Ernie Wiggs, Paul Schultz, Mike McClennan, Eric Carson, Len Morgan and Oscar Danielson.

Canterbury included Brian Langton, Bill Noonan, Rodney Walker and Graeme Cooksley.

Colin O'Neil played for Wellington.

The West Coast included Don Ladner, Bill Johnsen and John Hibbs.

== Club competitions ==
=== Auckland ===
Mount Albert won the Auckland Rugby League's Fox Memorial Trophy and Stormont Shield. They defeated Marist 20–0 in the Fox Memorial grand final. Otahuhu won the Rukutai Shield and Kiwi Shield, the first time this Shield was contested. Richmond won the Roope Rooster while City Newton won the Sharman Cup and Mangere East won the Norton Cup.

Gary Woollard, from Mount Albert, won the Lipscombe Cup, Eric Carson, from Glenora, won the Rothville Trophy and Ernie Wiggs, from Otahuhu, again won the Painter Rosebowl Trophy.

=== Wellington ===
Randwick won the Wellington Rugby League's Appleton Shield.

=== Canterbury ===
Hornby won the Canterbury Rugby League's Pat Smith Challenge Trophy, defeating Marist-Western Suburbs 10–9 in the Grand Final. Marist-Western Suburbs won the Massetti Cup while Linwood won the Gore Cup.

Eddie Brown (Addington), Robert Lanauze (Addington) and Robin Moffat (Hornby) shared the A.G.Bailey Challenge Cup as leading try scorers while John Rosanowski (Linwood) won the Turner and Le Brun Cup as leading goalscorer.

=== Other Competitions ===
Runanga and Hornby drew 0-all, which meant the West Coast Rugby League retained the Thacker Shield.
