= 1968 New Zealand rugby league season =

Seasons
- ← 1967 1969 →

The 1968 New Zealand rugby league season was the 61st season of rugby league that had been played in New Zealand.

== International competitions ==
New Zealand co-hosted the World Cup with Australia. The Kiwis lost to Great Britain, France and Australia. The team was coached by Des Barchard and consisted of Jim Bond (c), Eric Carson, Gary Clarke, Oscar Danielson, Kevin Dixon, Spencer Dunn, Doug Ellwood, Anthony Kriletich, Brian Lee, Colin McMaster, Robert Mincham, Colin O'Neil, Paul Schultz, Ray Sinel, Gary Smith, Roger Tait, Henry Tatana and Ernie Wiggs.

New South Wales Country toured New Zealand, losing to Southern Zone 12–10, Northern Zone 13-5 and New Zealand Māori 18–12.

The NSWRL Premiership winning South Sydney Rabbitohs toured the country, defeating the Auckland Rugby League champion Mount Albert Lions 27–13, Ponsonby 31-1 and Auckland Māori 33–14.

Ernie Wiggs won the New Zealand Rugby League's player of the year award.

== National competitions ==
=== Northern Union Cup ===
Canterbury held the Northern Union Cup at the end of the season. Auckland lost the trophy 16–3 to the West Coast at Wingham Park. The West Coast then defended it 19–12 against Canterbury at Wingham Park. However, they lost the return match 13–7 at the Addington Showgrounds and Canterbury regained the trophy. Canterbury defended the trophy against Otago, winning 35–11.

=== Inter-district competition ===
Auckland won the Rothmans trophy, beating Wellington 28–4 in the final.

Auckland defeated Canterbury 29-15 during Queen's Birthday weekend.

Ernie Wiggs, Roger Bailey, Mike McClennan, Dennis Key, Ken McCracken, John Sparnon, Gary Woollard, Victor Yates, Bill Burgoyne, Doug Gailey, Ray Williams, Ray Wilson, Robert Orchard, Tony Kriletich, Doug Ellwood, Ray Sinel and Eric Carson played for Auckland.

Canterbury included Graeme Cooksley, Brian Langton, Arthur Gillman, Bill Noonan, captain Jim White, Gary Clarke and Leo Brown.

== Club competitions ==
=== Auckland ===
Mt Albert won the Auckland Rugby League's Fox Memorial Trophy, defeating Ponsonby 12–7 in the grand final. Ponsonby won the Rukutai Shield, while Ellerslie won the Roope Rooster and Stormont Shield. Mount Wellington won the Sharman Cup.

John Young, from Ellerslie, won the Lipscombe Cup while Tony Kriletich, from Marist, won the Rothville Trophy. Ernie Wiggs, from Otahuhu, again won the Painter Rosebowl Trophy.

The University of Auckland club fielded its first senior side, coached by former Kiwi Jack Fagan. The Pakuranga club was formed as a feeder club to Ellerslie.

Ponsonby included Mike McClennan and Roger Bailey.

=== Wellington ===
Randwick won the Wellington Rugby League's Appleton Shield.

=== Canterbury ===
Linwood won the Canterbury Rugby League's Pat Smith Challenge Trophy, defeating Papanui 9–7 in extra time in the Grand Final. Addington and Papanui had shared the Massetti Cup as minor premiers while Eastern Suburbs won the Gore Cup.

The Christchurch club renamed itself Eastern Suburbs. Marist also became Marist-Western Suburbs.

Jim Toki (Papanui) won the A.G.Bailey Challenge Cup as leading tryscorer while John Rosanowski (Linwood) won the Turner and Le Brun Cup as leading goalscorer.

Jim Bond, Spencer Dunn and Gary Clarke played for Papanui.

=== Other Competitions ===
Runanga defeated Linwood 5–0 to win the Thacker Shield.
