= 1971 New Zealand rugby league season =

Seasons
- ← 1970 1972 →

The 1971 New Zealand rugby league season was the 64th season of rugby league that had been played in New Zealand.

== International competitions ==
New Zealand defeated Australia 2–1 in a Test series. New Zealand were coached by Lory Blanchard. They then toured Great Britain and France, winning 2–1 in Britain and 2–0, with one draw, in France. It was the Kiwis first Test win on British soil since the 1907-08 All Golds tour.

Australia defeated a New Zealand XIII 35-14 before losing to Auckland 14–15 at Carlaw Park. Coached by Neville Denton, Auckland included Mike McClennan, Bob McGuinn, Bernie Lowther, Dennis Williams, Roy Christian, Gary Woollard, Ken Stirling, Henry Tatana, Gene Woolsey, Don Mann, Murray Eade, Tony Kriletich and Ray Williams. Fred Schuster came on as a substitute.

Roy Christian won the New Zealand Rugby League's player of the year award.

== National competitions ==
=== Rugby League Cup ===
West Coast held the Rugby League Cup at the end of the season, after they had defeated Wellington. Wellington had defeated Canterbury 19–13 to win the trophy.

=== Inter-district competition ===
Auckland won the Rothmans trophy, defeating Waikato 44–9 in a semi final and Wellington 26–12 in the final.

Earlier in the year Auckland had defeated Waikato 48–5, Rest of New Zealand 33–17 in a Kiwis trial, Wellington 60–4, the West Coast 37-2 and Canterbury 28–5.

Canterbury defeated Otago 84–5.

Manawatu recorded their first victory over the Bay of Plenty, 24–19.

Roy Christian and Eddie Heatley played for Auckland.

Wellington included Colin O'Neil.

== Club competitions ==
=== Auckland ===
Otahuhu won the Auckland Rugby League's Fox Memorial Trophy, Rukutai Shield, Stormont Shield and Kiwi Shield. They defeated the Mount Albert Lions 25–12 in the Fox Memorial grand final. Marist Brothers won the Roope Rooster while Glenora won the Sharman Cup and Marist and Pakuranga shared the Norton Cup.

Eddie Wulf (Marist) won the Lipscombe Cup, Ken Stirling (Ellerslie) won the Rothville Trophy and Bert Humphries Memorial (back) award. Eddie Heatley (Otahuhu) won the Bert Humphries Memorial (forward) award. Paul Matete (Otahuhu) won the Tetley Trophy, Brian Tracey (Ponsonby) won the Painter Rosebowl Trophy and Morrie Robertson (Ellerslie) won the Hyland Memorial Cup.

Murray Eade, Robert Orchard and Doug Gailey played for Ellerslie while Otahuhu included Roy Christian, Shane Dowsett, Dave Sorensen and Bob McGuinn. Tony Kriletich and Bill Burgoyne played for Marist and Mount Wellington included Mike McClennan. John O'Sullivan and Don Mann played for Ponsonby and Richmond included Bernie Lowther and Ray Williams. Te Atatu included Dennis Williams while Mount Albert included Gary Woollard and Henry Tatana.

=== Wellington ===
Marist won the Wellington Rugby League's Appleton Shield.

Kevin Tamati played for Petone.

=== Canterbury ===
Papanui won the Canterbury Rugby League's Pat Smith Challenge Trophy, defeating Addington 27–8 in the Grand Final. Papanui won the Massetti Cup while Linwood won the Gore Cup.

As the Canterbury Rugby League, who had nine premier teams, and the West Coast Rugby League, who had five premier teams, played a trans-Alps series instead of both competitions having a bye.

Trevor Williams (Hornby) won the D.V. Syme Rosebowl as Sportsman of the year. Phil Brown (Marist-Western) and John Watts (Linwood) shared the A.G.Bailey Challenge Cup while Trevor Williams (Hornby) won the Turner and Le Brun Cup.

Jim Bond was the coach of university, who played in the senior division for the first time. Rodney Walker played for Papanui.

=== Other Competitions ===
This was Phillip Orchard's final season playing for the Ngongotaha Chiefs, as he moved to Wellington in 1972.

Graeme West for the Hawera Hawks in the Taranaki Rugby League competition.

Waro-Rakau defeated Papanui 7–3 to win the Thacker Shield.
