= 1970 New Zealand rugby league season =

Seasons
- ← 1969 1971 →

The 1970 New Zealand rugby league season was the 63rd season of rugby league that had been played in New Zealand.

== International competitions ==
New Zealand lost a series 0–3 to Great Britain under coach Morrie Church. The Kiwis then headed to Great Britain and France for the World Cup. They defeated France but lost to Great Britain and Australia. The team was coached by Lory Blanchard and included Mocky Brereton, Roy Christian, Graeme Cooksley, Bill Deacon, Doug Gailey, Lummy Graham, John Greengrass, Eddie Heatley, Elliot Kereopa, Tony Kriletich, Don Ladner, Bernie Lowther, Bob McGuinn, Colin O'Neil, Garry Smith, John Whittaker and Gary Woollard. Brian Anderson was ruled out of the squad due to injury.

To end its seven match New Zealand tour, Great Britain defeated Auckland 23–8 at Carlaw Park. Auckland included; Mike McClennan, Roy Christian, Wayne Redmond, Paul Matete, John Dagg, Fred Schuster, Eric Carson, Eddie Moore, Len Morgan, Brian Lee, Ray Williams, Ernie Wiggs and captain Tony Kriletich. Roger Bailey was to have captained Auckland but withdrew.

Auckland defeated New South Wales Country 20–12.

Roy Christian won the New Zealand Rugby League's player of the year award. Ron McGregor was elected as the New Zealand Rugby League's president and chairman, roles he would hold for seventeen years.

== National competitions ==
=== Rugby League Cup ===
Canterbury held the Rugby League Cup at the end of the season after they had defeated the West Coast 20–16 at the Addington Showgrounds.

=== Inter-district competition ===
Wellington won the Rothmans trophy, defeating Waikato 27–21 in the final. Auckland were eliminated by Waikato 36–11 in a semi final in Huntly.

Earlier in the season Auckland had defeated Wellington 30-8 and Canterbury 42–17. At the same time Auckland B defeated Waikato 19–11.

Canterbury changed from the red and black hoop design they had worn for the last 16 years and adopted a red jersey with a black and white vee.

Roy Christian, Eddie Heatley, Bernie Lowther, Henry Tatana and Roger Bailey played for Auckland while Waikato included Don Parkinson and Bill Deacon.

Canterbury included Mocky Brereton, Graeme Cooksley, John Greengrass, Alan Rushton, captain Rodney Walker, Jim Fisher and Jim White.

Don Ladner played for the West Coast.

== Club competitions ==
=== Auckland ===
Otahuhu won the Auckland Rugby League's Fox Memorial Trophy and Roope Rooster. They defeated Mount Albert 10–5 in the Fox Memorial grand final. Mount Albert won the Stormont Shield, Kiwi Shield and Rukutai Shield. Te Atatu and Point Chevalier shared the Sharman Cup while Northcote won the Norton Cup.

Ray Williams, from Richmond, won the Lipscombe Cup, Tony Kriletich, from Marist, won the Rothville Trophy, Mike McLennan, from Ponsonby, won the Tetley Trophy, Ernie Wiggs, from Otahuhu, again won the Painter Rosebowl Trophy and Simon Yates from Otahuhu won the Hyland Memorial Cup.

Brian Anderson and Eddie Heatley played for Otahuhu. Anderson would sign with the North Sydney Bears in 1972, being joined by Heatley in 1973. Morrie Robertson was appointed as the coach of Ellerslie.

=== Wellington ===
Randwick won the Wellington Rugby League's Appleton Shield.

The Wellington Council grants the Rugby League use of a city-centre park that is renamed Rugby League Park.

=== Canterbury ===
Linwood won the Canterbury Rugby League's Pat Smith Challenge Trophy, defeating Marist-Western Suburbs 21–2. Papanui won the Massetti Cup while Hornby won the Gore Cup.

The first floodlight Canterbury club fixture was a Vivian Cup challenge played between Linwood and Marist at English Park on 30 September.

Jim White (Addington) won the D.V. Syme Rosebowl as Sportsman of the year while Norm Geddes (Papanui) won the A.G.Bailey Challenge Cup and Hugh Butler (Papanui) and John Rosanowski (Linwood) shared the Turner and Le Brun Cup (goals).

Mocky Brereton joined Marist-Western Suburbs while Jim Bond was the coach of university.

=== Other Competitions ===
Runanga defeated Linwood 11–2 to win the Thacker Shield.
