= 1971 New Zealand rugby league tour =

1971 Kiwis tour
- Date: 4 September 1971 – 28 November 1971
- Manager: Bill O'Callaghan; Jack Williams
- Coach: Lory Blanchard
- Tour captain: Roy Christian
- Top point scorer: Henry Tatana (145)
- Top try scorer: Phil Orchard (27)
Summary
| P | W | D | L |
Total
| 26 | 15 | 1 | 10 |
Test match
| 6 | 4 | 1 | 1 |
Opponent
| P | W | D | L |
Great Britain
| 3 | 2 | 0 | 1 |
France
| 3 | 2 | 1 | 0 |

Tour chronology
- ← 1967 1972 →

The 1971 New Zealand rugby league tour was a series of matches played between September and November by the New Zealand national rugby league team in England and France. The team played a three-game series against Great Britain, and won the series 2–1, becoming the first New Zealand team to win a series on British soil since the inaugural 1907–08 All Golds Tour. The team also defeated France 2–0.

== Touring party ==
A 26-man touring squad was selected in August 1971, with Roy Christian named as captain.

Lory Blanchard was the coach, and Bill O'Callaghan and Jack Williams were the team co-managers.

| Name | Position | Club/District |
|---|---|---|
| Mike McClennan | Fullback | (New Zealand) Auckland |
| John O'Sullivan | Fullback | (New Zealand) Wellington |
| Mocky Brereton | Three-quarter | (New Zealand) Canterbury |
| Bob McGuinn | Three-quarter | (New Zealand) Auckland |
| Phil Orchard | Three-quarter | (New Zealand) Bay of Plenty |
| John Whittaker | Three-quarter | (New Zealand) Wellington |
| Roy Christian (c) | Three-quarter | (New Zealand) Auckland |
| Bernie Lowther | Three-quarter | (New Zealand) Auckland |
| Dennis Williams | Three-quarter | (New Zealand) Auckland |
| Dave Sorensen | Three-quarter | (New Zealand) Auckland |
| Gary Woollard | Halves | (New Zealand) Auckland |
| Graeme Cooksley | Halves | (New Zealand) Canterbury |
| Ken Stirling | Halves | (New Zealand) Auckland |
| Shane Dowsett | Halves | (New Zealand) Auckland |
| Robert Orchard | Prop | (New Zealand) Auckland |
| Henry Tatana | Prop | (New Zealand) Auckland |
| John Greengrass | Prop | (New Zealand) Canterbury |
| Doug Gailey | Prop | (New Zealand) Auckland |
| Bill Burgoyne | Hooker | (New Zealand) Auckland |
| Jim Fisher | Hooker | (New Zealand) Canterbury |
| Garry Smith | Second-row | (New Zealand) Wellington |
| Tony Kriletich (vc) | Second-row | (New Zealand) Auckland |
| Don Mann | Second-row | (New Zealand) Auckland |
| Bill Deacon | Second-row | (New Zealand) Waikato |
| Murray Eade | Loose forward | (New Zealand) Auckland |
| Ray Williams | Loose forward | (New Zealand) Auckland |

== Schedule and results ==
A 25-match tour itinerary was announced in July 1971, with the tourists later agreeing to an additional fixture against Oldham. Prior to the main tour, New Zealand also played two warm-up games against amateur sides in London on 29 and 30 August.

| Date | Opponents | Score (NZ first) | Venue | Attendance | Notes |
|---|---|---|---|---|---|
| 4 September | Rochdale Hornets | 23–8 | Rochdale | 2,374 | |
| 6 September | St Helens | 8–18 | St Helens | 8,169 | |
| 8 September | Hull Kingston Rovers | 10–12 | Hull | 5,746 | |
| 12 September | Widnes | 18–15 | Widnes | 5,787 | |
| 15 September | Castleford | 8–25 | Castleford | 5,889 | |
| 18 September | Warrington | 2–13 | Warrington | 6,295 | |
| 25 September | Great Britain | 18–13 | Salford | 3,764 | |
| 30 September | Barrow | 25–15 | Barrow-in-Furness | 4,839 | |
| 2 October | Whitehaven | 21–8 | Whitehaven | 3,105 | |
| 8 October | Swinton | 15–26 | Swinton | 3,280 | |
| 10 October | Wigan | 24–10 | Wigan | 11,987 | |
| 16 October | Great Britain | 17–14 | Castleford | 4,108 | |
| 17 October | Huddersfield | 10–11 | Huddersfield | 3,495 | |
| 20 October | Leigh | 5–10 | Leigh | 3,819 | |
| 22 October | Salford | 30–31 | Salford | 7,127 | |
| 24 October | Wakefield Trinity | 23–12 | Wakefield | 5,367 | |
| 27 October | Oldham | 24–13 | Oldham | 1,882 | |
| 30 October | Bradford Northern | 30–23 | Bradford | 6,277 | |
| 31 October | York | 5–11 | York | 2,803 | |
| 6 November | Great Britain | 3–12 | Leeds | 5,479 | |
| 11 November | France | 27–11 | Perpignan | 3,581 | |
| 14 November | Littoral Province | 14–9 | Avignon | | |
| 18 November | Racing Club Albi XIII | 29–9 | Albi | | |
| 21 November | France | 24–2 | Carcassonne | 7,200 | |
| 24 November | Bordeaux Selection | 20–9 | Bordeaux | | |
| 28 November | France | 3–3 | Toulouse | 5,000 | |
