= 1971 Kangaroo tour of New Zealand =

1971 rugby league tour

- Manager: R.A. (Dick) Dunn; Ralph Stafford
- Coach(es): Harry Bath
- Tour captain(s): Graeme Langlands
- Top point scorer(s): Keith Campbell 17
- Top try scorer(s): Bob Fulton 5
- Top test point scorer(s): Keith Campbell 3
- Top test try scorer(s): Keith Campbell 1
Summary
P	W	D	L
Total
3	1	0	2
Test match
1	0	0	1
Opponent
P	W	D	L
New Zealand
1	0	0	1

Tour chronology
- Previous tour: 1969
- Next tour: 1980

The 1971 Kangaroo Tour of New Zealand was a mid-season tour of New Zealand by the Australia national rugby league team. The Australians played three matches on tour, including a test against the New Zealand national rugby league team. The tour began on 22 June and finished on 29 June.

== Leadership ==
Harry Bath was the coach of the squad, which he had been since 1968 in this particular tenure. St. George Dragons fullback Graeme Langlands was named captain for the tour ahead of 1969 New Zealand Tour leader John Sattler.

== Touring squad ==
All but three members of the squad played in the New South Wales Rugby League premiership, those players being Wayne Bennett, Brian Fitzsimmons and Jim Murphy. Several tour members represented the Australia national rugby league team but only played in minor matches in New Zealand.

Player	Club	Position(s)	Games	Tests	Tries	Goals	F/Goals	Points
Barry Beath	St. George	Prop	2					
Wayne Bennett	Ipswich All Whites	Wing	2		1			3
Ray Branighan	Manly Warringah	Wing	3	1		1		2
Tony Branson	St. George	Five-eighth	1	1				
Keith Campbell	Parramatta	Centre, Lock	2	1	1	7		17
Ron Costello	Canterbury-Bankstown	Second-row	2	1				
Brian Fitzsimmons	Brothers Brisbane	Hooker	3	1				
Bob Fulton	Manly Warringah	Centre	3	1	5			15
Bob Grant	South Sydney	Halfback	3	1				
Graeme Langlands (c)	St. George	Fullback	1	1				
Bob McCarthy	South Sydney	Second-row	3	1	2			6
Jim Murphy	Western Suburbs	Second-row	2					
Bob O'Reilly	Parramatta	Prop	2	1	1			3
Tom Raudonikis	Western Suburbs	Halfback	2					
Paul Sait	South Sydney	Centre	2	1				
John Sattler	South Sydney	Prop	1	1				
Geoff Starling	Balmain	Centre	2		1			3
Lionel Williamson	Newtown	Wing	3	1	1			2

== Tour ==
The Australians played three matches on the tour, winning one match and losing two, including the test match.

Tuesday 22 June

New Zealand XIII	14 – 35	Australia
Tries: Murray Eade, John Whittaker; Goals: Don Ladner (4)		Tries: Bob Fulton (3), Bob McCarthy (2), Wayne Bennett, Geoff Starling; Goals: Keith Campbell (7)

Davies Park, Huntly
Attendance: 3,572

=== Test ===
Saturday 26 June

New Zealand	24 – 3	Australia
Tries: John Whittaker (2); Mocky Brereton; Robert Orchard; Goals: Henry Tatana (6/7)		Tries: Keith Campbell; Goals:

Carlaw Park, Auckland
Attendance: 13,917
Referee: John Percival (New Zealand)

New Zealand

FB	1	Mike McClennan
RW	2	John Whittaker
CE	3	Bernie Lowther
CE	4	Roy Christian (c)
LW	5	Mocky Brereton
FE	6	Gary Woollard
HB	7	Ken Stirling
LK	13	Eddie Heatley
SR	11	Garry Smith
SR	12	Tony Kriletich
PR	8	Henry Tatana
HK	9	Colin O'Neil
PR	10	Robert Orchard
Coach:
(New Zealand) Lory Blanchard

Australia

FB	1	Graeme Langlands (c)
RW	2	Ray Branighan
CE	3	Bob Fulton
CE	8	Paul Sait
LW	5	Lionel Williamson
FE	6	Tony Branson
HB	7	Bob Grant
LF	16	Keith Campbell
SR	9	Bob McCarthy
SR	10	Ron Costello
PR	11	Bob O'Reilly
HK	12	Brian Fitzsimmons
PR	13	John Sattler
Coach:
(Australia) Harry Bath

Tuesday 29 June

Auckland	15 – 14	Australia
Tries: Murray Eade (2), Ray Williams; Goals: Henry Tatana (3)		'Tries: Bob Fulton (2), Lionel Williamson, Bob O'Reilly; Goals: Ray Branighan

Carlaw Park, Auckland
Attendance: 11,000
