= 1967 New Zealand rugby league season =

Seasons
- ← 1966 1968 →

The 1967 New Zealand rugby league season was the 60th season of rugby league that had been played in New Zealand. This was the first season played under a limited tackle rule, four tackles were allowed until the limit was expanded to the current six in 1976.

== International competitions ==
New Zealand toured Australia, losing the series 1–2. The team was coached by Lory Blanchard.

Bob Irvine won the New Zealand Rugby League's player of the year award.

== National competitions ==
=== Northern Union Cup ===
Auckland again held the Northern Union Cup at the end of the season.

=== Inter-district competition ===
Auckland won the Rothmans trophy, defeating Wellington 39–13 in the final.

Auckland included Eric Carson, Victor Yates, Paul and Bill Schultz, Doug Ellwood and Ernie Wiggs. Bob Irvine played for Canterbury

== Club competitions ==
=== Auckland ===
Ponsonby won the Auckland Rugby League's Fox Memorial Trophy, Stormont Shield and Rukutai Shield. They defeated Otahuhu 12–9 in the Fox Memorial grand final. Otahuhu won the Roope Rooster and Southern won the Sharman Cup.

Doug Ellwood, from City Newton, won both the Lipscombe Cup and Rothville Trophy. Ernie Wiggs, from Otahuhu, won the Painter Rosebowl Trophy.

The University of Auckland rugby league club was founded for the second time. The club fielded a team in the sixth grade that was coached by former Kiwi Bill Snowden.

Ponsonby were coached by Ian Grey and included Roger Bailey, Victor Yates, Rick Carey, Ken McCracken, Mike McClennan, Don Mann and Brian Tracey.

=== Wellington ===
Waterside won the Wellington Rugby League's Appleton Shield.

=== Canterbury ===
Hornby won the Canterbury Rugby League's Pat Smith Challenge Trophy, defeating Addington 17–10 in the inaugural grand final. Addington had won the Massetti Cup as minor premierers. Marist won the Gore Cup 24–12 over Linwood.

Greymouth Marist defeated Hornby 24–13 to win the Thacker Shield.

Gordon Abercrombie (Linwood), Michael Napier (Papanui) and Robin Moffat (Hornby) all shared the A.G.Bailey Challenge Cup as leading try-scorers.
