= Ian Robson =

Australian rugby league player

Personal information
- Full name: Ian Bruce Robson
- Born: 28 October 1947 (age 79)

Playing information
- Position: Second-row
Representative
Years	Team	Pld	T	G	FG	P
1969	Queensland	3	0	0	0	0
1969	Australia

Ian Bruce Robson (born 28 October 1947) is an Australian former rugby league player.

A rangy second-rower, Robson was a strong runner with the ball and began his career in Ipswich, before arriving at Brisbane club Wests aged 20. He had a stint in England with the Warrington Wolves in 1968.

Robson gained Queensland representative honours in 1969 and toured New Zealand that year with the national team, where he was kept out of the Test line-up by Ron Costello, Bob McCarthy and Col Weiss. He was forced to retire the age of 25 due to injuries and later competed in equestrian events.
