= 1975 Brisbane Rugby League season =

67th season of Brisbane Rugby League premiership

1975 Brisbane Rugby League
- Teams: 8
- Premiers: Western Suburbs
- Minor premiers: Western Suburbs
- Player of the year: Steve Calder (Rothmans Medal)
- Top try-scorer(s): Wayne Bennett

The 1975 Brisbane Rugby League season was the 67th season of Brisbane Rugby League premiership. Eight rugby league teams from across Brisbane competed for the premiership, which culminated in a grand final match between the Western Suburbs and Redcliffe clubs.

== Season summary ==
Teams played each other three times, with 21 rounds of competition played. It resulted in a top five of Western Suburbs, Northern Suburbs, Redcliffe, Eastern Suburbs and Wynnum-Manly.

The 1975 season's Rothmans Medallist was Northern Suburbs player Steve Calder.

With seconds remaining in the decider, Redcliffe were trailing 26–24 to minor premiers Western Suburbs. The Dolphins had the ball and launched a bomb hoping for the best. However, before the ball landed, fans had flooded Lang Park ensuring there was no chance for Redcliffe to pressure Wests' receiver into an error. The ball ended up going into touch, ensuring that the fans did not ruin the final play of the game.

=== Teams ===
Club	Home ground	Coach	Captain
Eastern Suburbs	Langlands Park	Des Morris	Des Morris
Fortitude Valley	Neumann Oval	Henry Holloway	Marty Scanlan
Northern Suburbs	Bishop Park	Tommy Bishop	Tommy Bishop
Past Brothers	Corbett Park	Brian Fitzsimmons	Wayne Bennett
Redcliffe	Redcliffe Showgrounds	Barry Muir	Ian Pearce
Southern Suburbs	Davies Park	Harry Bath	Gary Dobrich
Western Suburbs	Purtell Park	Ron Raper	Harry Cameron
Wynnum-Manly	Kougari Oval	T. Berry	Nev Hornery

=== Ladder ===
	Team	Pld	W	D	L	PF	PA	PD	Pts
1	Western Suburbs	21	16	0	5	473	296	+177	32
2	Northern Suburbs	21	13	1	7	467	346	+121	27
3	Redcliffe	21	13	0	8	387	337	+50	26
4	Eastern Suburbs	21	11	2	8	390	338	+52	24
5	Wynnum-Manly	21	10	1	10	352	342	+10	21
6	Past Brothers	21	8	1	12	347	385	-38	17
7	Southern Suburbs	21	6	0	15	331	490	-159	12
8	Fortitude Valley	21	4	1	16	289	495	-206	9

== Finals ==
Home	Score	Away	Match Information
Home	Score	Away	Date and Time	Venue	Referee	Crowd
Qualifying Finals
Eastern Suburbs	7-9	Wynnum-Manly	30 August 1975	Lang Park	Eddie Ward	8,000
Northern Suburbs	15–2	Redcliffe	31 August 1975	Lang Park	Ian Smith
Semi-finals
Redcliffe	22-15	Wynnum-Manly	6 September 1975	Lang Park	Ian Smith
Western Suburbs	21-11	Northern Suburbs	7 September 1975	Lang Park	Eddie Ward
Preliminary Final
Northern Suburbs	2-25	Redcliffe	13 September 1975	Lang Park	Eddie Ward
Grand Final
Western Suburbs	26-24	Redcliffe	21 September 1975	Lang Park	Ian Smith	41,000

== Grand Final ==
Western Suburbs	Position	Redcliffe
1. Greg McCarthy	FB	1. Tony Obst
2. Michael Flesser	WG	2. Brian Gardiner
3. Harry Cameron (c)	CE	3. Peter Flanders
4. Greg Heading	CE	4. Ian Pearce (c)
5. Wayne Stewart	WG	5. Victor Tighe
6. Geoff Richardson	FE	6. Steve Williams
7. Greg Oliphant	HB	7. Brian Winney
8. Norm Carr	LK	8. Ian Thinee
9. Rod Bradshaw	SR	9. Rod Halley
10. Henry Williamson	SR	10. Forrester Grayson
11. Max Williamson	PR	11. Bevan Bleakley
12. Kel Brown	HK	12. Bob Jones
13. John Young	PR	13. Steve Bullow
14. Bob Green	Reserves	14. Chris Mason
19. Carlo Costa	Reserves	15. Geoff Russell
20. C Anderson	Reserves	16. Peter Leis
	Reserves	19. Brad McArthur
Ron Raper	Coach	Barry Muir

Redcliffe's storming finish was not enough, as Western Suburbs held on to claim its first premiership in 21 years.

Redcliffe were coming home strong 26–24, but Panthers held on, to win their ninth premiership and first since 1954. Redcliffe won the scrum count 7–4, the Dolphins winning the penalties 11-7 as well.

Western Suburbs 26 (Tries: H. Cameron, R. Bradshaw, G. McCarthy, G. Heading. Goals: W. Stewart)

Redcliffe 24 (Tries: T. Obst, I. Pearce, G. Russell, B. Bleakley. Goals: I. Pearce 6)
