= 1977 Pacific Cup =

- Number of teams: 5
- Host country: New Zealand
- Winner: Māori (2nd title)
- Matches played: 11

The 1977 Pacific Cup was the second edition of the Pacific Cup, a rugby league tournament held between Pacific teams. The tournament was hosted by New Zealand and eventually won by the New Zealand Māori side, who defeated Western Australia 35–12 in the final.

== Background ==
The 1977 Pacific Cup was run by the New South Wales Rugby League, following the success of the inaugural 1975 Pacific Cup. The tournament involved three Australian state sides as well as Papua New Guinea, who did not yet have Test match status, and the New Zealand Māori. In the end the 1977 Pacific Cup proved to be expensive to run and resulted in the cancellation of the planned 1979 Pacific Cup.

== Squads ==
Each team was allowed to choose a 22-man squad for the tournament.

- New Zealand Māori: Reg Tamihere, Noel Rollo, James Leuluai, Pesa Sua, Ray Harris, Dennis Key, Murray Netzler, Neil Aspin, John Wilson, Josh Liavaa, T. Tolea, Ian Bell, K. Jenkinson (Auckland); Dick Uluave (Manawatu); C. Morgan, Warren Rangi, Harry Waikai, Rick Muru, Pop Raihe (c) (Waikato); Jack Knuckey (Taranaki); Eddie Orchard (Bay of Plenty); R. Tiananga (Hamilton).
- Papua New Guinea: Dikana Boge, Tara Gau, Bob Greathead, Garia Kora, Steve Malum, Paul Tore, John Wagambie (c), Asi Winnie (Southern Region); Joe Gandel, Sukope Iko, Paul Kombinari, Jack Metta, Alan Rero, Stainer Sapu, Joe Tomerup, Linus Gene (Highlands Region); Openi Geno, Vai Karava, Kaiva Kako (Northern Region); Peter Pais, David Pukuntap, David Tangoa (Islands Region).

=== Team of the Tournament ===
Following the final, a 17-man squad was named consisting of the best players in the tournament. Papua New Guinea lock John Wagambie was named the player of the tournament.

- New Zealand Māori: John Wilson, Ray Harris, Eddie Orchard, Dennis Key, Murray Netzler, Ian Bell, Warren Rangi;
- Papua New Guinea: Bob Greathead, John Wagambie, Alan Rero, Tara Gau
- Western Australia: Martin Ridley, John Fielding, Alec Lockley
- Northern Territory: Brian Allia, Bob Dowie
- Victoria: Dave McFee

== Results ==
An opening ceremony was held at Turangawaewae Marae in Huntly.

	Team	Pld	W	D	L	Pts
1	Māori	4	4	0	0	8
2	Western Australia	4	2	0	2	4
3	Papua New Guinea	4	2	0	2	4
4	Northern Territory	4	1	0	3	2
5	Victoria	4	1	0	3	2

=== Round 1 ===
14 September 1977

Western Australia	33 – 19	Papua New Guinea
Tries: Dixon (2), Fielding (2), Castle, Walls, Ridley, Mitchell, Kennedy; Goals: Rice (2), Walls		Tries: Tore, Bais, Boge; Goals: Geni (3), Kombinari (2)

Davies Park, Huntly

14 September 1977

Māori	27 – 10	Northern Territory
Tries: Uluave (2), Tamihere, Morgan, Rangi, Sua, Leuluai; Goals: Tamihere (3)		Tries: de la Cruz, Rogers; Goals: Allia, Walker

Davies Park, Huntly

=== Round 2 ===
17 September 1977

Māori	25 – 17	Papua New Guinea
Tries: Rangi, Toloa, Aspin, Key, Uluave; Goals: Tamihere (5)		Tries: Malum (3); Goals: Kombinari (4)

Rotorua

17 September 1977

Western Australia	10 – 14	Victoria
Tries: Fielding, Mitchell; Goals: Rice (2)		Tries: Hall, Watts; Goals: Wakefield (4)

Rotorua

=== Round 3 ===
18 September 1977

Māori	78 – 0	Victoria
Tries: Leuluai (5), Sua (3), Liavaa (3), Bell (3), Rollo (2), Netzler, Key; Goals: Wilson (12)

Tokoroa

18 September 1977

Papua New Guinea	25 – 14	Northern Territory
Tries: Rero (3), Kora, Geno; Goals: Kombinari (5)		Tries: Mitchell, Dowie, Elliott, Caswell; Goals: Castillion

Tokoroa

=== Round 4 ===
21 September 1977

Papua New Guinea	42 – 12	Victoria
Tries: Rero (5), Geno (2), Wagambie (2), Karava; Goals: Kombinari (6)		Tries: Hoyle, Wakefield, de Tournouer, Bayne

Davies Park, Huntly

21 September 1977

Western Australia	23 – 16	Northern Territory
Tries: Fielding (2), Dixon, Walls, Bowler; Goals: Rice (4)		Tries: Harrison, Mitchell, Walker, Dowie; Goals: Castillon (2)

Davies Park, Huntly

=== Round 5 ===
1977

Māori	28 – 4	Western Australia

Carlaw Park, Auckland

1977

Northern Territory	33 – 29	Victoria

Carlaw Park, Auckland

=== Final ===
27 September 1977

Māori	35 – 12	Western Australia
Tries: Uluave (2), Rangi (2), Sua, Netzler, Tolea, Bell; Goals: Wilson (6)		Tries: Walls, Adams; Goals: Walls (3)

Carlaw Park, Auckland
Referee: Ray Seymour
