= McGuinn =

McGuinn is an Irish surname originating in Longford. Notable people with the surname include:

- Bob McGuinn, New Zealand rugby league player
- Jim McGuinn (born 1966), American radio personality
- Mark McGuinn (born 1968), American musician
- Roger McGuinn (born 1942), American singer-songwriter and guitarist
