= John Schuster =

Former (Western) Samoa & All Blacks dual-code rugby international footballer

Personal information
- Full name: Nestorio John Schuster
- Born: 17 January 1964 (age 62) Apia, Samoa

Playing information
- Height: 182 cm (6 ft 0 in)
- Weight: 83 kg (13 st 1 lb)

Rugby union
- Position: Second five-eighth, Centre
Club
Years	Team	Pld	T	G	FG	P
	Blackheath
	Harlequins
	Total	0	0	0	0	0
Representative
Years	Team	Pld	T	G	FG	P
1987–89	New Zealand	10	11	39	1	4
1999	Samoa	3	3	19	3	17

Rugby league
- Position: Centre, Wing
Club
Years	Team	Pld	T	G	FG	P
1991–93	Newcastle Knights	47	16	101	0	266
1993–97	Halifax	116	50	402	5	1009
	Total	163	66	503	5	1275
Representative
Years	Team	Pld	T	G	FG	P
1995	Western Samoa	2	0	11	0	22
- Relatives: Fred Schuster (brother)

Nesetorio Jonny Schuster (born 17 January 1964) is a former international rugby league and rugby union player, a dual-code international.

Schuster went to St Joseph's College and played for Marists Saint-Joseph, then six times for Samoa before leaving for New Zealand in 1984. From 1987 to 1989 he played for the All Blacks. In May 1990, he switched to rugby league, signing for Australian club Newcastle Knights. He later moved to England, joining Halifax, where he scored over 1,000 points between 1993 and 1997.

He later returned to rugby union, and played for Blackheath and Harlequins. While playing for Harlequins he was the 1998–99 Premiership Rugby top points scorer with 331 points.

== Background ==
Schuster was born in Apia, Samoa.
