= John Wagambie =

Former PNG RL national coach and former PNG international rugby league footballer

Personal information
- Full name: John Pius Wagambie

Playing information
- Position: Five-eighth, Lock
Representative
Years	Team	Pld	T	G	FG	P
1977–82	Papua New Guinea	3	0	0	0	0

Coaching information
Representative
Years	Team	Gms	W	D	L	W%
1992	Papua New Guinea	5	0	0	5	0
1996	Papua New Guinea (NRL)	1	0	0	1	0

John Pius Wagambie is Papua New Guinea Kumul (#14) and coached the Papua New Guinea Kumuls in the 1980s.

Wagambie came to prominence in May 1977 when he captained Papua New Guinea in a historic 37–6 win against France. A few weeks later, he had initially declared himself unavailable for the upcoming 1977 Pacific Cup, as he was training to become a police officer, but was later selected after being granted leave by the police commissioner to play in the tournament. Although the team failed to reach the final, Wagambie was named as the player of the tournament. Later that year, he was also named as Papua New Guinea's Sportsman of The Year.
