= George Mann (rugby league) =

NZ & Tonga international rugby league footballer

Personal information
- Full name: George William Mann
- Born: 31 July 1965 (age 60); New Zealand

Playing information
- Position: Prop, Second-row
Club
Years	Team	Pld	T	G	FG	P
	Mangere East
1988	Newcastle Knights	8	0	0	0	0
1988–89	Leigh	13	4	0	0	16
1989–93	St. Helens	141	23	0	0	92
1994–96	Leeds	77	16	0	0	64
1997	Warrington Wolves	24	1	0	0	4
1999–00	Widnes Vikings	49	4	0	0	16
	Total	312	48	0	0	192
Representative
Years	Team	Pld	T	G	FG	P
	Auckland
1995	Tonga	2	0	0	0	0
1989–91	New Zealand	9	0	0	0	0
- Relatives: Esau Mann (brother); Duane Mann (cousin); Don Mann (uncle)

George William Mann (born 31 July 1965) is a New Zealand-Tongan former professional rugby league footballer who played in the 1980s and 1990s, who represented both New Zealand and Tonga.

== Background ==
George Mann is the cousin of the rugby league footballer; Duane Mann.

== Playing career ==
A Mangere East junior, Mann played for Auckland, Newcastle, Leigh, St. Helens, Leeds, Warrington and Widnes.

=== County Cup Final appearances ===
Mann played as a second-row and scored two tries in St. Helens' 24–14 victory over Rochdale Hornets in the 1991 Lancashire Cup Final during the 1991–92 season at Wilderspool Stadium, Warrington, on Sunday 20 October 1991. He also played in St. Helens' 4–5 defeat by Wigan in the 1992 Lancashire Cup Final during the 1992–93 season at Knowsley Road, St. Helens, on Sunday 18 October 1992.

=== International honours ===
Mann was a Tonga and New Zealand international and played for Tonga at the 1986 Pacific Cup and 1995 World Cup.

== Retirement ==
His career was ended in 2000 by a high tackle from Oldham's Chris Holland, Mann suffered horrific facial injuries, including a broken jaw.
