= Esau Mann =

Tonga international rugby league footballer

Personal information
- Born: 11 May 1971 (age 55)
- Height: 177 cm (5 ft 10 in)
- Weight: 95 kg (14 st 13 lb)

Playing information
- Position: Hooker, Lock
Club
Years	Team	Pld	T	G	FG	P
1994–96	Counties Manukau	73	23	0	0	92
Representative
Years	Team	Pld	T	G	FG	P
1992–2000	Tonga	3	0	0	0	0
- Relatives: George Mann (brother); Duane Mann (cousin); Don Mann (uncle)

Esau Mann (born 11 May 1971) is a Tongan former professional rugby league footballer who represented Tonga at the 2000 World Cup. He is a cousin and brother of fellow internationals Duane and George Mann.

== Playing career ==
With the launch of the Lion Red Cup in 1994 Mann joined the Counties Manukau Heroes. He was part of the side that lost the 1994 Lion Red Cup grand final. Mann played in 73 Lion Red Cup matches over the three seasons of the competition, a record.

With the demise of the competition in 1997 Mann joined the Mangere East Hawks.

Mann also had a stint with the Narrandera Lizards in Group 20 Rugby League.

In 1999 Mann played for Auckland South in the national provincial championship.

With the inaugural season of the Bartercard Cup in 2000, Mann joined the Otahuhu Leopards who lost the grand final.

Mann then spent 2001 in the Canberra Cup competition, playing for the West Belconnen Warriors.

== Representative career ==
Mann played for Tonga for over eight years, including at the 1992 Pacific Cup and at the 2000 World Cup.

Mann captained the New Zealand Residents in 2000.
