= Graham Lye =

Australia international rugby league player

Personal information
- Full name: Graham Enos Lye
- Born: 14 August 1948 (age 78)

Playing information
- Position: Five-eighth
Club
Years	Team	Pld	T	G	FG	P
1970–72	Parramatta Eels	50	7	0	1	22
Representative
Years	Team	Pld	T	G	FG	P
1969–70	New South Wales	2	2	0	0	6
1969	Australia

Graham Enos Lye (born 14 August 1948) is an Australian former rugby league player.

Lye was a product of rugby league in the Illawarra.

A five-eighth, Lye starred with two tries for New South Wales in a win over Queensland at Lang Park in 1969 and subsequently won a place on the Australian squad for a tour of New Zealand, where he was kept out of the Test line-up by Denis Pittard. He began competing with Parramatta in 1970 and the following pre-season took over the club captaincy, but had to relinquish it to Ron Lynch when the league season began, following a player's vote.
