= Duane Mann =

Former NZ & Tonga international rugby league footballer

Personal information
- Full name: Duane Darrin Mann
- Born: 28 June 1965 (age 61) Auckland, New Zealand

Playing information
- Height: 178 cm (5 ft 10 in)
- Weight: 90 kg (14 st 2 lb)
- Position: Hooker
Club
Years	Team	Pld	T	G	FG	P
1986–02	Glenora Bears	212	49			196
1989–93	Warrington	124	27			108
1994	North Harbour	23	9	0	0	36
1995	Auckland Warriors	13	3	0	0	12
1996	Counties Manukau	15	3	1	0	14
	Total	387	91	1	0	366
Representative
Years	Team	Pld	T	G	FG	P
1986–00	Tonga	16	6	1	0	25
1987–99	Auckland	65
1989–94	New Zealand	29	3	0	0	12

Coaching information
Representative
Years	Team	Gms	W	D	L	W%
2006	Tonga
- Education: Kelston Boys High School
- Father: Don Mann
- Relatives: George Mann (cousin); Esau Mann (cousin)

Duane Darrin Mann (born 28 June 1965) is a former rugby league footballer who played in the 1980s and 1990s and coached in the 2000s. A Tonga and New Zealand international representative hooker, he captained both sides. Mann played his club football for New Zealand sides Glenora, North Harbour, Auckland Warriors and Counties Manukau, as well as for English club, Warrington.

== Background ==
Of Maori and Tongan descent, Mann was born in Auckland on 28 June 1965 into a family that already had a large presence in rugby league, with his father Don Mann representing New Zealand, his cousin Esau going on to play for Tonga, and his brother Don Jr., going on to work in administration at the New Zealand Warriors. He is also the cousin of fellow New Zealand and Tongan international, George.

== Playing career ==
=== 1980s ===
Mann attended Kelston Boys High School and played for the Glenora Bears from schoolboys right up to premier grade. When the Tonga national rugby league team was first formed to compete in the 1986 Pacific Cup he was selected to play in the side, making his international début.

Mann made his début for the Auckland rugby league team in 1987 and played in their 30-14 win over Great Britain in 1988. He was also selected to represent Tonga at the 1988 Pacific Cup in Apia, Samoa. In 1989 Mann signed for the Warrington Wolves in the English Championship. During the 1989 Kangaroo tour of New Zealand he was selected to play for the Kiwis against Australia. From 1989 to 1993 Mann would play in 24 consecutive tests, including matches that formed part of the 1989–1992 World Cup.

=== 1990s ===
Mann played for Warrington as a hooker in their 14-36 defeat by Wigan in the 1990 Challenge Cup Final at Wembley Stadium, London on Saturday 28 April 1990, in front of a crowd of 77,729. During the 1990 Kangaroo tour of Great Britain and France he played for his club Warrington against Australia. Mann played hooker in Warrington's 12-2 victory over Bradford Northern in the 1990–91 Regal Trophy Final at Headingley, Leeds on Saturday 12 January 1991.

Mann played for three seasons in England before returning home to Auckland when his contract expired at the end of the 1992–93 season. He played a season for the North Harbour Sea Eagles who he captained to win the 1994 Lion Red Cup. In 1994 he was made captain of the New Zealand side. Mann was signed by the Auckland Warriors who were to enter the Australian Rugby League competition in 1995, and played in the club's inaugural match. That year he switched national allegiance back to Tonga whom he captained in both the 1995 and later the 2000 World Cup tournaments.

Mann left the Warriors in 1996 and returned to win the Lion Red Cup, as captain of the Counties Manukau Heroes. He captained and won three successive Fox Memorial Championships with the Glenora Bears in the 1997, 1998 and 1999 Auckland Rugby League competition and again represented Auckland in the 1997 Super League Challenge Cup.

== Later life ==
Mann was occasionally involved in coaching with the Tongan national side, and in 2006 he was co-coach of the team that won the Pacific Cup. Mann has worked in the sport and education sector for over 15 years and has also run his own retail business and corporate training. Mann also served for a time as the New Zealand Warriors Junior Development Coach. In 2008 and 2009 he was the head coach of the Glenora Bears in the Auckland Rugby League. He has also held positions as the coaching development manager with Regional Sports Trusts and the Greater Auckland Coaching Unit, and New Zealand Rugby League's high performance director. Mann was previously Business & Sport Director and also Old Boys Chairman at Kelston Boys High School and occasionally works as a commentator and presenter on Sky TV. In 2010 and 2011 he was the head coach of the Bay Roskill Vikings.

== Match Fit ==
In 2024, Mann was drafted in to make his debut on episode 2 of Match Fit: Union vs. League as a medical substitute for Henry Fa'afili, who pulled out before the bronco test due to atrial fibrillation. He gained clearance to substitute when he metabolic age came out -11 against his biological age and finished at 6:37 on his initial bronco test. He improved to 6:20 on the final test. He also made it to a perfect -15 metabolic age at the end of the 15 weeks.
