= Richard Bolton (rugby league) =

NZ international rugby league footballer (1943–2024)

Personal information
- Full name: Richard Keith Bolton
- Born: 4 June 1943 New Zealand
- Died: 13 May 2024 (aged 80) New Zealand

Playing information
- Position: Loose forward
Club
| Years | Team | Pld | T | G | FG | P |
|---|---|---|---|---|---|---|
| | Mount Albert Lions |
Representative
| Years | Team | Pld | T | G | FG | P |
| | Auckland |
| 1972 | New Zealand | 1 | 0 | 0 | 0 | 0 |
| 1973–75 | New Zealand Māori |
| | New Zealand rep |

Coaching information
Representative
| Years | Team | Gms | W | D | L | W% |
| 1986–88 | New Zealand Māori |
| 1987–88 | Waikato |

Richard Keith Bolton (4 June 1943 – 13 May 2024) was a New Zealand rugby league footballer, manager, and coach who represented New Zealand.

== Playing career ==
Bolton was an Auckland representative and played in one Test match for the New Zealand national rugby league team, the second Test against Australia in 1972. He captained the New Zealand Māori side which won the 1975 Pacific Cup.

== Coaching career ==
After retirement Bolton turned to coaching. He coached the New Zealand Māori side to wins in the 1986 and 1988 Pacific Cups, and also coached Waikato in 1987 and 1988. During this time, Bolton also served on the New Zealand Māori Rugby League board between 1983 and 1984. He later served as trainer of the 1990 New Zealand Māori side.

== Later years ==
Bolton served as the manager of the New Zealand national rugby league team in 1992 and 1993 under coach Howie Tamati.

In 1994, Bolton was employed by the New Zealand Rugby League as the national development officer. In this role, he is credited with establishing the national secondary schools competition. He retired from this role in 1997, but returned to the position in 2002 and also managed the Junior Kiwis in 2005. In 2009, he was the Auckland Rugby League's deputy chairman.

Bolton died on 13 May 2024, at the age of 80.
