= Brian Fitzsimmons =

Australian rugby league player (1941–2016)

Personal information
- Full name: Brian William Fitzsimmons
- Born: 28 September 1941 Georgetown, QLD, Australia
- Died: 22 June 2016 (aged 74) Thuringowa Central, QLD, Australia

Playing information
- Position: Hooker
Club
Years	Team	Pld	T	G	FG	P
19??–??	? (Innisfail)
19??–??	Brothers (Brisbane)
	Total	0	0	0	0	0
Representative
Years	Team	Pld	T	G	FG	P
1965–71	Queensland	20	0	0	0	0
1967–71	Australia	4	0	0	0	0

Brian William Fitzsimmons (28 September 1941 – 22 June 2016) was an Australian rugby league footballer of the 1960s and '70s. A Queensland state and Australia national representative hooker, Fitzsimmons played his club football in North Queensland as well as in the Brisbane Rugby League for the Brothers club.

Originallly from Mareeba in Far North Queensland Fitzsimmons played for Babinda Colts. He was a regular Queensland representative player from 1965 to 1971 and also made sporadic international appearances during this period, which included a match against France at the 1968 Rugby League World Cup. An Innisfail premiership player, Fitzsimmons was selected to go on the 1969 Kangaroo tour of New Zealand but did not play in any Test matches. He was again selected for the 1971 Kangaroo tour of New Zealand, playing in the sole Test.

He later made a Brisbane Rugby League grand final with Brothers in 1974. For the 1975 Brisbane Rugby League season Fitzsimmons stayed on as coach of the Wayne Bennett-captained Brothers club.

A hotelier by profession, Fitzsimmons also coached rugby league in Townsville and served on the North Queensland Cowboys steering committee prior to their admission into the league.

Fitzsimmons is a member of the North Queensland Team of the Century.
