= William Schultz (rugby league) =

New Zealand international rugby league footballer and coach

Bill Schultz
Personal information
- Born: 6 July 1938 New Zealand
- Died: 18 April 2015 (aged 76) Bay of Islands, New Zealand

Playing information
- Height: 5 ft 11 in (180 cm)
- Weight: 12 st 1 lb (169 lb; 77 kg)
- Position: Hooker
Club
Years	Team	Pld	T	G	FG	P
	Point Chevalier Pirates
	Marist Saints
1968–70	Eastern Suburbs	15
	Total	15	0	0	0	0
Representative
Years	Team	Pld	T	G	FG	P
1964–66	Auckland	2
1959–65	New Zealand	4	1	0	0	3
- Relatives: Paul Schultz (brother)

William Thomas Schultz (6 July 1938 – 18 April 2015) was a New Zealand rugby league footballer who played for Eastern Suburbs and the New Zealand national team.

== Playing career ==
Schultz played for the Point Chevalier Pirates and Marist Saints in the Auckland Rugby League competition. An Auckland representative, he played for Auckland against France in 1964 and Great Britain in 1966.

He toured Australia with the New Zealand national rugby league team in 1959 and toured France and England in 1965, scoring one test try.

In 1968, Schultz moved to Australia to play for the Eastern Suburbs Roosters in the New South Wales Rugby League competition for three seasons. He retired in 1970 following the reserve grade final against Newtown Jets.

He finished his rugby league career coaching the Point Chevalier Pirates. He was the older brother of fellow New Zealand rugby league international Paul Schultz.
