= Keith Campbell (rugby league) =

Australian rugby league footballer

Personal information
- Full name: Keith Campbell
- Born: 21 February 1951 (age 75) Wentworthville, Sydney, Australia

Playing information
- Position: Centre, Lock
Club
Years	Team	Pld	T	G	FG	P
1968–75	Parramatta	111	13	171	0	381
Representative
Years	Team	Pld	T	G	FG	P
1971	New South Wales	2	0	5	0	10
1971	Australia	1	0	0	0	3

Keith Campbell is an Australian former professional rugby league footballer who played in the 1960s and 1970s. He played his entire career for Parramatta as a centre and also represented Australia and New South Wales.

== Playing career ==
Campbell played his junior rugby league with Wentworthville before making his debut for Parramatta in the 1968 season. In his first three seasons at the club, Parramatta hovered around the middle to lower table of the competition and the club finished last in 1970. In 1971, Campbell and Parramatta's fortunes changed with the club qualifying for the finals before being eliminated in the first week against St George. Campbell had a breakout year with the player representing Australia and New South Wales and finished top scorer for Parramatta. In 1972, Parramatta suffered a form reversal and finished last on the table, this would be the last time the club would finish last until 2012. Although the club finished last, Campbell finished as top point scorer for Parramatta once again.

The 1973 and 1974 seasons saw Parramatta finish outside the finals places but in 1975 the club appointed former St George player Norm Provan as head coach. Under Provan, Campbell and Parramatta enjoyed a solid year with the club finishing 5th on the table and qualifying for the finals. In the first week of the finals, Campbell scored all of Parramatta's points as they defeated arch rivals Canterbury 6-5. The following week, Parramatta lost to Manly 22-12 which ended their season. This would be Campbell's last game in first grade and he retired at the end of the season when he was a member of the reserve grade premiership winning side.
