= Dennis Key =

New Zealand international rugby league footballer

Personal information
- Full name: Dennis Anthony Key
- Born: 20 July 1947 (age 77); New Zealand

Playing information
- Position: Wing, Halfback
Club
Years	Team	Pld	T	G	FG	P
	Point Chevalier
	Glenora
	Total	0	0	0	0	0
Representative
Years	Team	Pld	T	G	FG	P
	Auckland
1967–81	New Zealand Māori
1969	New Zealand	1	0	0	0	0

Dennis Anthony Key (born 20 July 1947) is a New Zealand former professional rugby league footballer who played as a wing or halfback. He made one Test appearance for New Zealand in 1969, and was a New Zealand Māori representative at the 1975 and 1977 Pacific Cup.

== Playing career ==
At club level, Key started his career as a wing for Point Chevalier. In 2019, he was named in the club's Team of the Century. Later in his career, he played for Glenora as a halfback.

Key debuted for New Zealand Māori in 1967, and was named in the team for the inaugural Pacific Cup tournament in 1975. The team won the tournament, with Key being named the "Best and Fairest Player". He was also selected for the 1977 Pacific Cup, with the Māori team retaining the trophy.

He played for New Zealand against Australia in the first Test of the 1969 Kangaroo tour of New Zealand, but was dropped following the team's defeat.
