= Point Chevalier Pirates =

New Zealand rugby league club

Club information
- Full name: Point Chevalier Pirates Rugby League Club
- Colours: Green and White
- Founded: 1919; 107 years ago

Current details
- Ground: Walker Park
- Coach: Brendan Douglas and Ben Lisipa
- Manager: Malu Schaaf
- Captain: Patrick Sipley
- Competition: Auckland Rugby League

Records
- Premierships: 1953, 2013, 2014, 2015, 2018, 2022, 2023
- Runners-up: 2016, 2017
- Minor premierships: 1956, 1995, 2013, 2014, 2017, 2021
- Roope Rooster: 1951, 2014, 2015, 2016, 2017, 2021, 2022
- Stormont Shield: 1951, 2014, 2015, 2016, 2017, 2018, 2021, 2022
- Fox Memorial: 1953, 2013, 2014, 2015, 2018, 2022, 2023
- Sharman Cup: 1951, 1952, 1970, 1987, 1988, 1989, 2011
- Phelan Shield: 2010

The Point Chevalier Pirates are a New Zealand rugby league club based in Point Chevalier. The Pirates currently compete in the Fox Memorial (First Division) competition run by the Auckland Rugby League.

== History ==
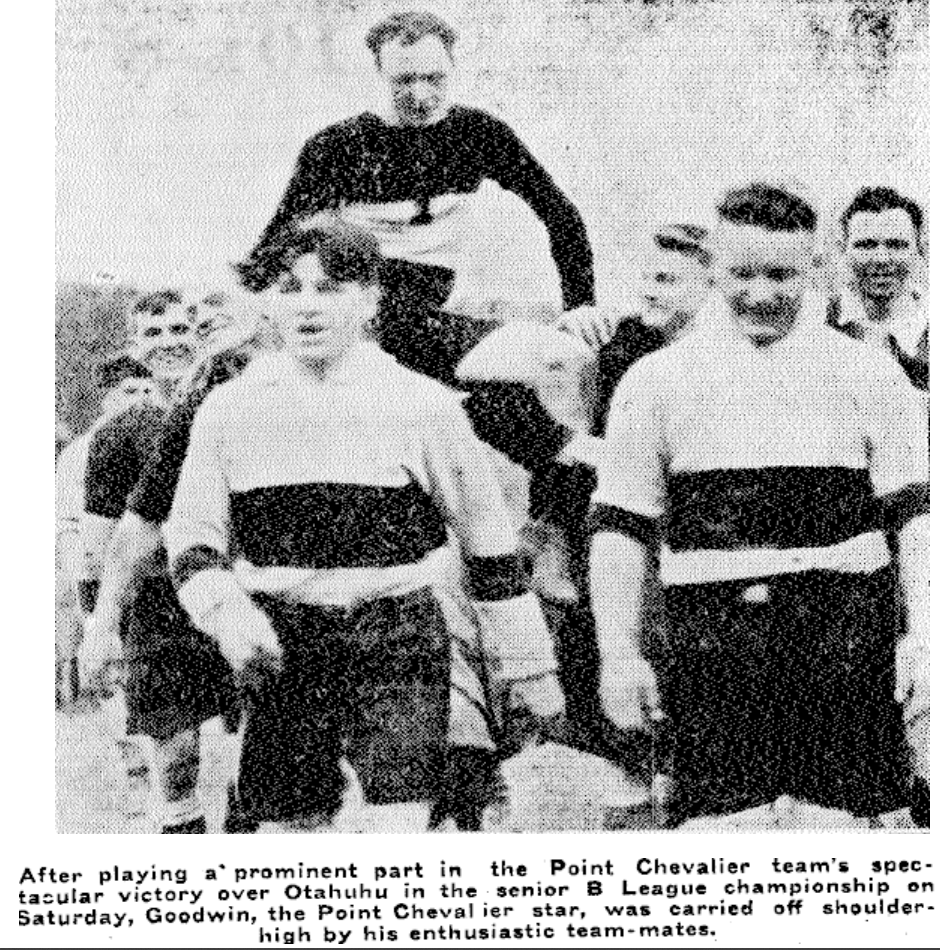
Point Chevalier player, Goodwin, being carried from the field after their final victory in 1929 over Otahuhu Rovers (13-10).

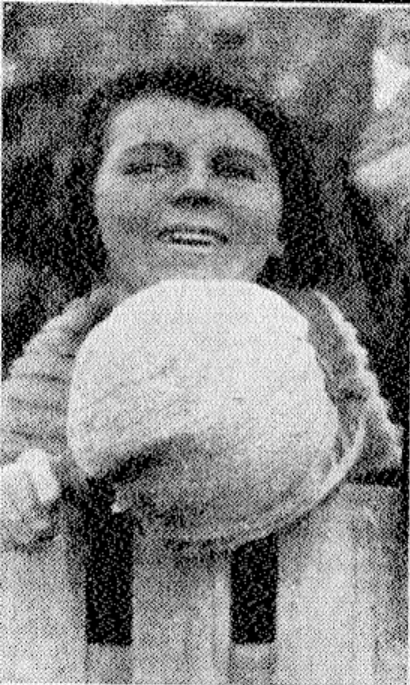
A Point Chevalier supporter at their final 13-10 final victory over Otahuhu in 1929 in the B-Grade division.

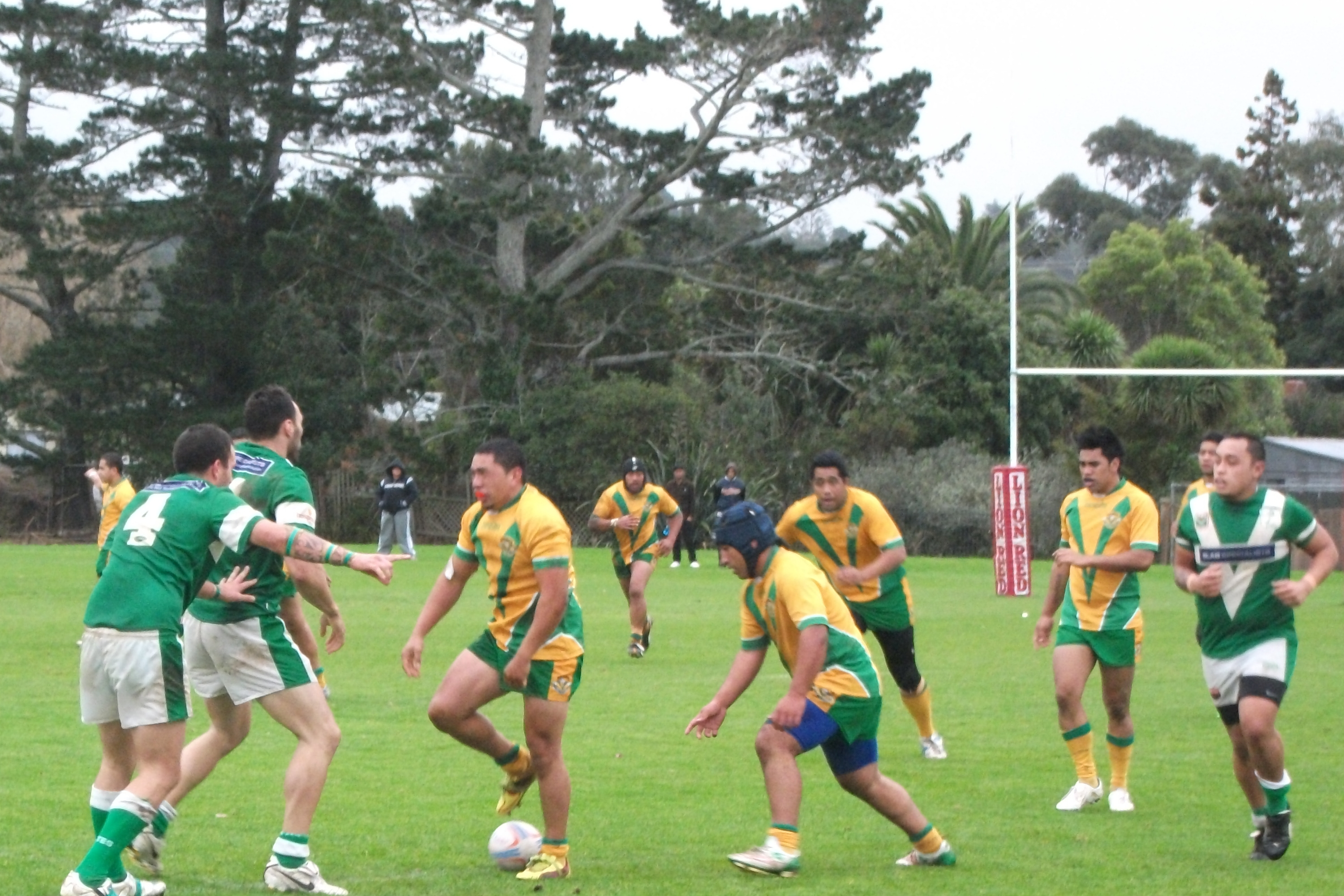
Point Chev v Waitemata in 2010.

The club was founded in 1919, in Auckland. On April 5, 1919, the Auckland Star reported that a "new club that has just been affiliated is the Eden Ramblers, boys from Avondale and Point Chevalier". In 1911, a club named Eden Ramblers had formed in the area and played at the Avondale racecourse with the club rooms in Point Chevalier. However they ceased fielding teams during 1913 and effectively folded in the same year. The new team however was not to become known as the Eden Ramblers but in fact were named Point Chevalier rugby league club. Point Chevalier did not field any teams in 1919 and were not officially registered with the Auckland Rugby League until 1920 when they entered a side in the third grade therefore their true beginnings were more likely 1920 than 1919. Their first ever match was played at Walker Park on May 8, 1920 against Devonport United (North Shore Albions). The shore side won 22-6.

Point Chevalier won their first ever Fox Memorial title in 1953.

In the 1980s and 1990s, the club's senior team merged with the City club to form City-Point Chevalier.

=== 2010 and beyond resurgence ===
In 2010, Awen Guttenbeil returned to the club as coach. Former professional players Stacey Jones, Wairangi Koopu, Monty Betham and Karl Te Nana all joined the squad for the club's 90th year as the team easily won the Phelan Shield.

This began a rapid rise for the club as they won the Sharman Cup (second division) the following year, gaining promotion to the Fox Memorial for 2012. The Pirates finished the season third, but in their final match against the Marist Saints, the Pirates fielded a third-string side and were beaten 102–0, and denied Papakura, who had beaten the Pirates on both occasions the teams had met earlier in the year, a place in the semi-finals to play the Pirates again the following week. Papakura appealed to the Auckland Rugby League, and the Pirates were found guilty of bringing discredit on the game and were ejected from the play-offs.

The Pirates came back stronger the following year and won the Fox Memorial in 2013, 2014 & 2015. Only three other clubs have won 3 in a row in the history of the 1st grade competition. They won the Fox Memorial again in 2018. They failed to make the final in 2019 and then the 2020 and 2021 seasons were cancelled due to covid. They had been in second position after 8 rounds in 2020 when the season was cancelled. In 2021, they had progressed unbeaten through the qualifying competition with 11 wins and were unbeaten through the Fox Premiership games with another 7 wins however the season was once again cancelled prior to their semi final with Glenora. In 2022 a shortened competition was run and Point Chevalier won their 6th title with a 14-12 win over recent rivals Glenora Bears.

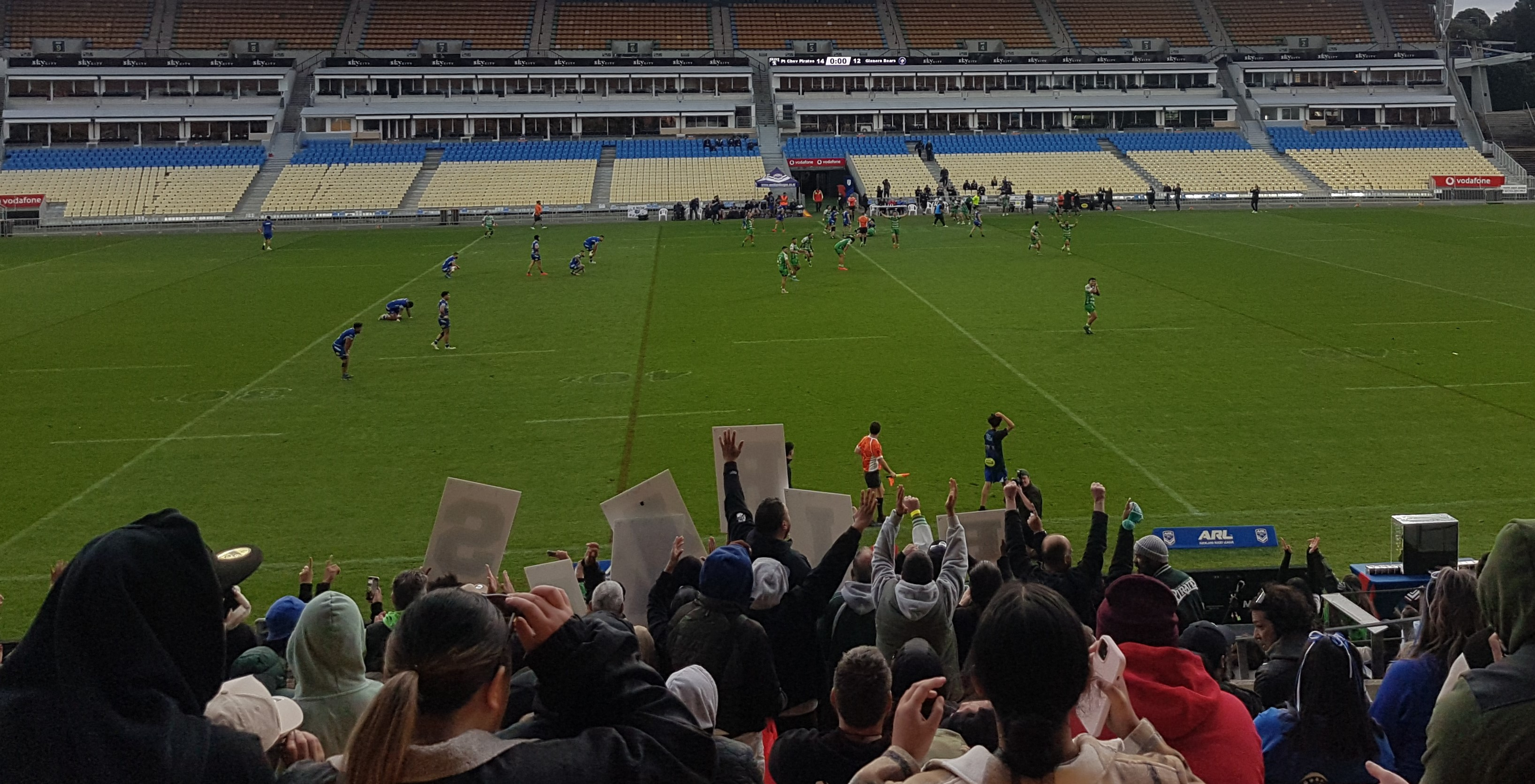
Point Chevalier at the final whistle of the 2022 final.

== Notable players ==
Notable players to play for the club include Great Britain representative Karl Harrison and Samoan international Hutch Maiava.

Players to play for the New Zealand national rugby league team include Stacey Jones, Doug Anderson, Vic Belsham, Shane Varley, Jack Russell-Green, Bill Schultz, Paul Schultz, Bob McGuinn, Henry Maxwell, Duncan MacRae, Ken Stirling, Gordon Moncur, Graham Mattson, Dennis Key, John Sparnon, Awen Guttenbeil,Fuifui Moimoi, Tawhiao Rogers, Henry Paul, Evarn Tuimavave Tevita Latu, Wairangi Koopu, Paki Afu,

The club has also produced three test referees: Vic Belsham, John Percival and Ray Shrimpton.

== Point Chevalier Senior Team Records (1920-1945 + 2020-2026) ==
The season record for the most senior men’s team in the club.

Season	Grade	Name	Play	W	D	L	PF	PA	PD	Pts	Position (Teams)
1920	3rd Grade	Point Chevalier	3	0	0	3	15	57	-42	0	Approximately 4th of 6 (full results unknown)
1921	3rd Grade (Myers Cup)	Point Chevalier	5	4	0	1	70	18	8	8	2nd of 7, full results unknown
1922	3rd Grade (Myers Cup)	Point Chevalier	12	8	1	3	199	67	132	17	3rd of 12, full results unknown
1923	3rd Grade (Myers Cup)	Point Chevalier	15	10	0	5	72	35	+37	20	2nd of 14, lost the final 7-10 to Ponsonby.
1924	5th Grade	Point Chevalier	2	0	0	2	3	6	-3	0	13th of 16, Results unknown
1925	3rd Grade	Point Chevalier	6	6	0	0	115	9	+126	12	3rd of 18, full results unknown
1926	2nd Grade	Point Chevalier	15	7	1	1	100	37	63	15	2nd of 11, full results unknown
1927	B Division (Norton Cup)	Point Chevalier	13	2	1	9	82	139	-57	5	6th of 7
1928	B Division (Norton Cup)	Point Chevalier	12	4	1	7	104	138	-34	9	6th of 7
1929	B Division (Norton Cup)	Point Chevalier	11	9	1	1	108	61	47	19	1st of 6
1930	B Division (Norton Cup)	Point Chevalier	13	10	1	2	108	62	46	21	2nd of 7
1931	2nd Grade	Point Chevalier	14	12	1	1	144	32	112	25	1st of 8
1932	2nd Grade	Point Chevalier	16	3	2	8	41	85	-44	8	Approximately 7th of 9
1933	2nd Grade	Point Chevalier	-	-	-	-	-	-	-	-	Results unknown (7 teams)
1934	2nd Grade	Point Chevalier	14	5	1	8	-	-	-	11	5th of 6
1935	Senior B (Sharman Cup)	Point Chevalier	9	1	0	7	63	102	-39	2	3rd of 4
1936	Senior B (Sharman Cup)	Point Chevalier	8	4	0	4	83	64	19	8	3rd of 5
1937	Senior B (Sharman Cup)	Point Chevalier	14	11	0	3	127	34	93	22	2nd of 9
1938	Senior B (Sharman Cup)	Point Chevalier	12	3	1	8	52	79	-27	7	4th of 6
1939	Senior B (Sharman Cup)	Point Chevalier	8	4	0	4	49	53	-4	8	3rd of 6
1940	Senior B (Sharman Cup)	Point Chevalier	5	1	0	4	36	50	-14	2	4th of 5
1941	Senior B/Reserves (Sharman Cup)	Point Chevalier	4	1	0	3	18	57	-39	2	7th of 9 (incomplete record)
1942	Schoolboys (Senior)	Point Chevalier	-	-	-	-	-	-	-	-	7 teams unknown results
1943	3rd Grade	Point Chevalier	-	-	-	-	-	-	-	-	1st
1944	Fox Memorial	Point Chevalier	17	2	0	15	148	330	-182	4	9th of 10
1945	Fox Memorial	Point Chevalier	14	2	0	12	118	264	-146	4	9th of 10
2020	Fox Memorial Qualifiers	Point Chevalier	8	7	0	1	302	112	191	14	2nd of 12, comp cancelled due to covid
2021	Fox Memorial Qualifiers	Point Chevalier	11	11	0	0	470	136	334	22	1st of 12 in the Fox Qualifiers
	Fox Memorial Premiership		7	7	0	0	247	110	137	14	1st of 8, comp cancelled due to covid
2022	1st Grade (Fox Memorial)	Point Chevalier	8	8	0	0	388	112	276	16	1st of 9 in section 1
	Playoffs		3	3	0	0	78	46	+32	-	W v Mt Albert 40-22 in QF, W v Howick 24-12 in SF, W v Glenora 14-12 in GF
2023	Fox Qualifiers	Point Chevalier	3	3	0	0	190	16	174	6	1st of 4 in Pool A
	Fox Memorial		11	9	1	1	354	161	+193	19	2nd of 12
	Playoffs		2	2	0	0	82	26	+56	-	W v Howick 58-10 in SF, W v Richmond 24-16 in GF
2024	Fox Qualifiers	Point Chevalier	3	1	0	2	70	46	24	2	3rd of 4 in Pool B
	Fox Memorial		11	7	0	4	334	234	+100	14	5th of 12
	Playoffs		2	1	0	1	35	39	-4	-	W v Otahuhu 23-16 in QF, L v Richmond 12-23 in SF
2025	Fox Memorial	Point Chevalier	12	5	1	6	354	302	52	11	7th of 10
2026	Fox Memorial	Point Chevalier	14	6	2	6	336	274	62	14	4th of 8
	Playoffs		1	0	0	1	18	32	-14	-	L v Mt Albert 18-32 in Minor SF
1920-45 + 2020-2026	TOTAL		451	235	19	186	7,839	6,210	+1,629	440	Includes playoff statistics also
