= Sam Rolleston =

New Zealand international rugby league footballer

Personal information
- Full name: Augustine Sam Rolleston
- Born: 1939
- Died: Deceased

Playing information
- Position: Centre
Representative
Years	Team	Pld	T	G	FG	P
≤1969–≥69	Wellington
1969	New Zealand	1	0	0	0	0

Augustine Sam Rolleston is a New Zealand former professional rugby league footballer who played in the 1960s. He played at representative level for New Zealand, and Wellington, as a centre.

== Playing career ==
=== International honours ===
Rolleston represented New Zealand in 1969 against Australia.
