= Jeff Denman =

Australian rugby league player

Personal information
- Born: 14 June 1943 (age 81)

Playing information
- Position: Wing / Centre
Representative
Years	Team	Pld	T	G	FG	P
1964–69	Queensland	10	4	0	0	12
1969	Australia

Jeff Denman (born 14 June 1943) is an Australian former rugby league player.

A speedy three-quarter from Ipswich, Denman was a Queensland interstate player through much of the 1960s and represented the Australia national team on a 1969 tour of New Zealand.

Denman played his rugby league in Brisbane for Eastern Suburbs, scoring eight tries in finals. After coming close to signing with Cronulla-Sutherland in 1969, Denman went on to feature as a winger for Eastern Suburbs in their 1972 Brisbane Rugby League grand final win over Fortitude Valley.
