= 1975 Pacific Cup =

- Number of teams: 4
- Host country: PNG
- Winner: Māori (1st title)
- Matches played: 7

The 1975 Pacific Cup was the first edition of the Pacific Cup, a rugby league tournament held between Pacific teams. The tournament was hosted by Papua New Guinea and eventually won by the New Zealand Māori side, who defeated the hosts 38-13 in the final.

== Background ==
The 1975 Pacific Cup was initiated by the New South Wales Rugby League. The tournament involved two Australian state sides as well as Papua New Guinea, who did not yet have Test match status, and the New Zealand Māori.

The Northern Territory were invited to participate, but had to drop out after Darwin was devastated by Cyclone Tracy.

== Squads ==
- Coached by Tom Newton, the New Zealand Māori squad included Paul Matete, John Wilson, Fred Ah Kuoi, John Smith, Rick Muru, Dane Sorensen, Dennis Key, Ian Bell and captain Richard Bolton. The Māori side played a warm up game before the competition began, defeating Group 19 12-11 in Tweed Heads.

== Results ==
	Team	Pld	W	D	L	Pts
1	Māori	3	3	0	0	6
2	Papua New Guinea	3	2	0	1	4
3	Western Australia	3	1	0	2	2
4	(Victoria (state)) Victoria	3	0	0	3	0

=== Round 1 ===
4 May 1975

Western Australia	23 – 21	(Victoria (state)) Victoria
Tries: Haris-Walker (2), Kelly; Goals: Clarke (7)		Tries: King (2), Tehei, Smith, Hoyle; Goals: Tehei (3)

Lloyd Robson Oval, Port Moresby

4 May 1975

Papua New Guinea	15 – 41	Māori
Tries: Bubol (2), Guere; Goals: Heiler (3)		Tries: Ah Kuoi (2), Bolton, W. Sorensen, Chetham, Matete, Waikai, Wilson, Netzler; Goals: Wilson (7)

Lloyd Robson Oval, Port Moresby

=== Round 2 ===
1975

Māori	61 – 3	(Victoria (state)) Victoria

Lloyd Robson Oval, Port Moresby

1975

Papua New Guinea	15 – 13	Western Australia

Lloyd Robson Oval, Port Moresby

=== Round 3 ===
1975

Papua New Guinea	38 – 0	(Victoria (state)) Victoria

Lloyd Robson Oval, Port Moresby

1975

Māori	38 – 15	Western Australia

Lloyd Robson Oval, Port Moresby

=== Final ===
1975

Māori	38 – 13	Papua New Guinea

Lloyd Robson Oval, Port Moresby
