= Paul Matete =

RL coach and NZ international rugby league footballer (1949–2020)

Personal information
- Full name: Paul Kehoma Matete
- Born: 12 December 1949 New Zealand
- Died: 17 June 2020 (aged 70)

Playing information
- Position: Wing, Centre
Club
Years	Team	Pld	T	G	FG	P
	Otahuhu
1979	Eastern United
	Total	0	0	0	0	0
Representative
Years	Team	Pld	T	G	FG	P
1970–75	Auckland
1975	New Zealand Māori
1975	New Zealand	1	0	0	0	0

Coaching information
Representative
Years	Team	Gms	W	D	L	W%
1992–95	South Africa	2	0	0	2	0
1997–00	South Africa	4	0	0	4	0
- Source: As of 24 March 2021

Paul Kehoma Matete (12 December 1949 – 17 June 2020) was a New Zealand rugby league footballer, and coach who represented New Zealand in the 1975 World Cup.

== Playing career ==
A player for Otahuhu in the Auckland Rugby League competition, Matete was an Auckland representative. He won the Tetley Trophy in 1971 as the Auckland Rugby League's top tryscorer.

Matete represented New Zealand Māori at the 1975 Pacific Cup. Later that year he was selected for the New Zealand national rugby league team for the 1975 World Cup series. Matete played in one Test match, appearing at centre against Australia in a match New Zealand lost 24-8.

He joined the Eastern United club in 1979 and was part of the side that went through the season undefeated, with only three draws. Matete is Kiwi number 521. He is one of currently two hundred and twenty seven players who have played in only one Test match for the Kiwis.

== Coaching career ==
Matete first arrived in South Africa in 1992 and worked as the national team's head coach.

However, Matete did not take the team to the 1995 World Cup, when the Rhinos were instead coached by former Great Britain international Tony Fisher. Matate was reported to be averse to the involvement of another member of the team's staff, and coupled with getting married, he chose to step down as head coach for the tournament.

He returned as head coach in time to take the team to the 1997 Rugby League World Nines tournament and a Test match against France in December that year. France defeated South Africa 30 to 17 in that match, which was played at Stade Fernand Fournier in Arles, France. Matete was the victim of a car-jacking in 1998.

Matete later coached the side to the 2000 World Cup. Fellow Kiwi Mike McClennan served as the team's technical advisor. The side was unable to improve on its 1995 record as it did not win any of its three matches at the tournament.

Sporting positions
Preceded by Tony Fisher; 1995	Coach South Africa; 1997-2000	Succeeded by Steven van Zyl; 2001-2011
Preceded by	Coach South Africa; 1992-1995	Succeeded by Tony Fisher; 1995

== Later life and death ==
Matete returned to New Zealand after the 2000 World Cup and worked as a real estate agent in South Auckland for Barfoot & Thompson. He died on 17 June 2020.

== See also ==
- Janet Mackey
- Harcourts International
