= Col Weiss =

Australian rugby league player

Personal information
- Full name: Colin Ray Weiss
- Born: 15 September 1943 (age 81); Bundaberg, QLD, Australia

Playing information
- Position: Lock
Representative
Years	Team	Pld	T	G	FG	P
1966–72	Queensland	30	3	0	0	9
1969–70	Australia	3	0	0	0	0

Colin Ray Weiss (born 15 September 1943) is an Australian former rugby league player.

Weiss is the son of a competitive woodchopper and grew up on a farm in the Queensland locality of Sharon, not far from Bundaberg. He was educated at North Bundaberg State School and Bundaberg High School.

A blacksmith by profession, Weiss was a tireless lock with Bundaberg Wanderers and was a Queensland representative player from 1966 to 1972. He toured New Zealand with the national team in 1969 and made his debut in the 2nd Test at Carlaw Park in Auckland, coming into the side for Ron Costello. The following year, Weiss appeared in two of the three home Test matches against Great Britain.
