= Jim Murphy (rugby league) =

Australian rugby league player

Personal information
- Full name: James Michael Murphy
- Born: 31 March 1948 (age 77); Brisbane, QLD, Australia

Playing information
- Position: Front row / Second row
Club
Years	Team	Pld	T	G	FG	P
1968–72	Souths (Brisbane)	?	?	?	?	?
1973–76	Western Suburbs	55	14	0	0	42
	Total
Representative
Years	Team	Pld	T	G	FG	P
1970–72	Queensland	10	1	0	0	3
1972	Australia	1	0	0	0	0

James Michael Murphy (born 31 March 1948) is an Australian former rugby league player.

A forward, Murphy played his early rugby league with the RAAF and Ipswich club West End. He competed for Souths from 1968 to 1972, then in 1973 moved down to Sydney, making 55 first-grade appearances for the Western Suburbs Magpies. An interstate player for Queensland, Murphy toured New Zealand with the national team in 1971. After being an unused reserve in the First Test of the 1972 series against New Zealand, Murphy made his only Test appearance in the second match at Lang Park, where he came on for Bob McCarthy during the second half.

Murphy settled in Kempsey, New South Wales.
