= John Wilson (New Zealand rugby league) =

New Zealand international rugby league footballer

Personal information
- Full name: Johnnie Wilson
- Born: 11 October 1947 (age 77); Auckland, New Zealand

Playing information
- Position: Fullback
Club
Years	Team	Pld	T	G	FG	P
	Te Atatu Roosters
	Northcote Tigers
	Total	0	0	0	0	0
Representative
Years	Team	Pld	T	G	FG	P
	Auckland
1972	New Zealand	2	0	3	0	6
1975–77	New Zealand Māori

John Wilson is a New Zealand rugby league footballer who represented New Zealand in the 1972 World Cup.

== Playing career ==
Wilson played for the Te Atatu Roosters and represented Auckland. A fullback, Wilson was selected for the New Zealand national rugby league team in 1972. He played in two matches at that year's World Cup, scoring three goals.

In the second half of his career Wilson joined the Northcote Tigers and in 1975 won the Painter Rosebowl Trophy as the top point scorer in the Auckland Rugby League competition. In 1977 he won the Lipscombe Cup as Auckland's Sportsman of the Year. That same year, he was involved in Auckland's "Grand Slam" as they defeated Australia 19-15 on 1 June, Great Britain 14-10 on 14 June and France 17-0 on 21 June all at Carlaw Park.

Wilson was also part of the New Zealand Māori sides that won both the 1975 and 1977 Pacific Cups.
