= Brian Clark (rugby league) =

New Zealand rugby league footballer

Personal information
- Full name: Brian Robert Clark
- Born: 8 February 1947 (age 78); Auckland, New Zealand

Playing information
- Position: Centre
Club
Years	Team	Pld	T	G	FG	P
	Ellerslie
Representative
Years	Team	Pld	T	G	FG	P
1969	New Zealand	1	0	0	0	0

Brian Clark was a New Zealand rugby league footballer who represented New Zealand in 1969.

== Playing career ==
Clark played in the Auckland Rugby League competition for the Ellerslie Eagles. In 1969 Clark was selected in the New Zealand side that played two tests against Australia.
