= Fred Schuster =

New Zealand international rugby league footballer

Personal information
- Born: 29 May 1948 (age 78) Apia, Western Samoa

Playing information
- Position: Stand-off
Club
Years	Team	Pld	T	G	FG	P
	Marist Saints
Representative
Years	Team	Pld	T	G	FG	P
1970–71	Auckland	10	2	0	0	8
1970	New Zealand	2	0	0	0	0
- Relatives: John Schuster (brother)

Fred Schuster is a Samoan rugby league player who represented New Zealand in 1970. He is the older brother of former All Black and rugby league player John Schuster.

== Playing career ==
In 1970 Schuster played in two games against the touring Great Britain Lions. He was part of the Auckland side that lost to the Lions 8–23 and then played for New Zealand in their 9–23 loss at Rugby League Park.

In 1971, Schuster played for Auckland in their 15–14 win over Australia.
