= Brisbane Tigers =

Australian rugby league club, based in Brisbane

Club information
- Full name: Brisbane Tigers Rugby League Football Club Inc.
- Nickname(s): The Tigers, Easts
- Colours: Orange; Black
- Founded: Coorparoo (1917), Eastern Suburbs (1933)
- Website: thetigers.com.au

Current details
- Ground: Totally Workwear Stadium (4,000)
- CEO: Mitch Cook
- Coach: Matt Church
- Captain: Ryley Jacks
- Competition: Queensland Cup
- 2024 season: 11th

Records
- Premierships: 9 (1923, 1947, 1950, 1972, 1977, 1978, 1983, 1991, 2023)
- Runners-up: 16 (1919, 1921, 1922, 1925, 1926, 1929, 1946, 1948, 1949, 1951, 1953, 1968, 1971, 1976, 1992, 1993)
- Minor premierships: 7 (1925, 1927, 1946, 1947, 1976, 1991, 1992)
- Most capped: 226 – Des Morris
- Highest points scorer: 871 – Shane McNally

The Brisbane Tigers are a rugby league club based at Langlands Park, in the suburb of Coorparoo in Brisbane, Australia. Since 1996, they have competed in the Queensland Cup, having competed in the Brisbane Rugby League from 1934 to 1997, where they won eight premierships.

Formed as Coorparoo in 1917, the club became the Eastern Suburbs Tigers in 1933, commonly referred to as Easts Tigers or Easts. In 2020, the club re-branded as the Brisbane Tigers, keeping their traditional colours of gold and black.

== History ==
Eastern Suburbs logo

Easts had competed as Coorparoo in the Brisbane Rugby League premiership from 1917. A highlight of the 1920s was the signing of South Sydney star, Harold Horder as their captain-coach in 1924 and 1925. With the move to district football in 1933 a new club, the Eastern Suburbs District Rugby League club, was formed.

The club struggled on the field during the 1930s and 1940s and was in severe financial trouble. Between 1937 and 1945 the Easts Tigers won just nine of ninety matches, and suffered three winless seasons in 1940, 1944 and 1945. However, in 1946, the club was successfully revived after suffering many defeats during the war years with the re-election of A.G. (Taffy) Welch as club president and the implementation of a completely new management committee. In 1946 no less than twelve teams were registered with the Brisbane Rugby League. Of these teams, ten were semi finalists and seven made the grand finals. The main object was to present to the public a really strong first grade team. The next year, 1947, saw what would probably be the greatest side fielded by the club. Every trophy competed for in the BRL competition and Premiership were won and had no fewer than eleven players selected for Brisbane's Bulimba Cup team.

The Easts Tigers won their next premiership in 1950, and in 1951 the Easts Tigers contested the Grand Final being beaten by Southern Suburbs, This meant that, since the revival of the club in 1946, they had played six grand finals in succession. They reached the semis in 1952 and the grand final in 1953 where they were again beaten by Souths. In 1954, they failed to make the top four so, for the first time in eight years they failed to compete in the semi-finals. The club was to win the Peter Scott Memorial Trophy in the 1960 season but did not have success again until they won the pre-season competition in 1969.

The 15-year premiership drought forced club officials to search for a top coach and in 1965 former international, Clive Churchill was engaged to try to mould the team into a premiership 13. The effect was the club's appearance in the 1968 Grand Final against Past Brothers. Although they lost the Grand Final it sparked a resurgence in the Easts Tigers' performance for years to come and the Easts Tigers won the Woolworths pre-season competition in 1969.

The coach, Ted Verrenkamp, and his successor, captain-coach Des Morris, brought success to the club providing the Easts Tigers with numerous finals appearances and Grand Final victories throughout the 1970s. This was through the help of the Queensland Five-eighth and centre before King Wally, Wayne Lindenberg and Steve Farquhar plus the local junior talent highlighted by John Lang, who coached the Penrith Panthers to a grand final in 2003.

In the Queensland Wizard Cup era, the Easts Tigers have made the Grand Final five times although having lost all matches, the first to the Redcliffe Dolphins in 1997 then losing to the Burleigh Bears in a memorable extra-time final in 2004. They were defeated again in 2013 by Mackay and the next year by the Northern Pride. 2018 saw the disappointment continue as they lost to the Redcliffe Dolphins.

The club is currently led by the president, Keith Philips, and chief executive officer, Mitch Cook. In 2008, the year of the centenary of rugby league in Australia, the club celebrated its seventy-fifth anniversary.

On 20 January 2011, through BASES Productions, a family run entertainment group. The Easts Tigers began transmission of a fan-service to help boost the profile of the club and its players called TigerTV, in 2012 TigerTV began live broadcasting of entire matches via the internet; TigerTV has been regularly hosting live stream events of the Easts Tigers with Commentators Mike Higgison, Warren Boland, Gavin Payne, and David Wright. On 6 November 2016, TigerTV transitioned to a 24/7 Streaming Channel with Live and Recorded programming streaming continuously, along with replays and highlights of previous years. On 1 May 2018, play by play commentator Mike Higgison died. TigerTV has paid tribute to Higgison for his contributions in the club, and in Rugby League history. His relief and subsequent replacement is David Wright taking place as play by play commentator.

In 2018, the Easts Tigers rallied towards the end of the season, eventually winning each of the semi-finals, but when confronting old time rival, Redcliffe Dolphins in the Grand Final, the Easts Tigers ultimately came runners-up.

2019 has seen a change in the team line up, with a lot of the juniors and colts moving up to take the club forward, with a dominant first 5 rounds of the QRL competition, they have proven still a strong side, with finals hopes still alive by round 19.

On 18 October 2019, a new head coach Craig Hodges starts tenure at Langlands Park, coming fresh from his tenure at the Gold Coast Titans. Hodges, who replaced the sacked Garth Brennan as Gold Coast Titans coach for eight games that year, was announced as the new mentor for the Tigers Intrust Super Cup team in late August, taking over from Scott Sipple. After so many years as a deputy, Hodges, who started his tenure at Langlands Park earlier this month, said the chance to run his own program at a proud and historic club like Easts was too good an opportunity to pass up.

There was much enthusiasm for the 2020 season, but after the first round commenced, the club, and the Queensland Cup competition, were impacted by COVID-19 pandemic and as a result the Queensland Rugby League cancelled its four statewide competitions in 2020 due to the ongoing public health emergency.

The unprecedented decision to bring a premature close the Intrust Super Cup, BHP Premiership, Hastings Deering Colts and Auswide Bank Mal Meninga Cup was made in the interests of the health and safety of players and staff.

The Tigers subsequently paid all its players contracts, and helped retain as much staff as possible. Head Coach Craig and Head of Football Terry Matterson began helping CEO Brian Torpy with renovating the grounds with Mark McDonald. Helping keep Langlands Park clean and fresh.

On 4 September 2020, the club announced their re-branding as the Brisbane Tigers. From the 2021 season onward, the club would play under the new name in the Queensland Cup, Hastings Deering Colts, QRL Women's Premiership and Mal Meninga Cup competitions, but remain as the Eastern Suburbs Tigers for their local and junior teams.

Head Coach Craig Hodges announced on 24 September 2020 that he would resign and move to New Zealand Warriors, the club was thrilled with his appointment and wished him the best of luck. Almost the same time, Terry Matterson expressed an interest in becoming head coach of the Tigers, and was approved the following Tuesday. But almost immediately upon the appointment of Kevin Walters to be Coach of Queensland Maroons to become head coach of Brisbane Broncos on 30 September, Terry was approached to become assistant Coach and on 15 October 2020, it was announced that Kevin Walters has put together his Holy Trinity with the Broncos coach securing John Cartwright and Terry Matterson as his assistants in a bid to break Brisbane's 15-year premiership drought next season.

Fortunately during this transition, a former Tigers development coach, and previous head coach of Souths Logan Magpies, Jon Buchanan came to the club and was announced as the head coach on 13 October just before the previous announcement of Terry.

The club is now moving into Preseason 2021 and has announced the Trial dates for Mal Meninga Cup (U18s) and due to COVID-19 cancellations, the Hasting Deering Colts will be an Under 21s competition, a distinction from the usual Under 20s of the previous years.

== NRL affiliation ==
The Easts Tigers were the last team in the Queensland Cup to follow the trend of becoming affiliated with a team from the National Rugby League. After relationships with Cronulla-Sutherland Sharks and the Penrith Panthers, at the end of the 2006 NRL season the New South Wales club South Sydney Rabbitohs announced an alliance with the Easts Tigers as a feeder club for the National Rugby League (NRL) side.

At the end of the 2007 season it was announced that the Rabbitohs and the Easts Tigers would no longer be affiliated due to various conflicting issues, the Easts Tigers instead looked closer to home and struck an affiliate deal with the Brisbane Broncos.

At the end of the 2010 NRL season the Victorian club Melbourne Storm announced an alliance with the Easts Tigers as a feeder club for their NRL side. The partnership with the Easts Tigers allowed the Melbourne Storm to tap into the Easts Tigers' recruitment and development systems in Queensland, as well as providing a club for young Queenslanders recruited by the Melbourne Storm to play at and develop without having to relocate to Melbourne. The affiliation with Melbourne has been extended a number of times, with the latest extension being until the end of the 2024 season.

In September 2025, the Tigers struck a feeder-club agreement with the Perth Bears in the Queensland Cup, ahead of the Bears entry to the NRL in 2027.

== NRL bid ==
In March 2020, the Tigers entered the bidding race to win a potential license to join the NRL. In early June, the club filed a trademark for the name "Brisbane Firehawks", which would avoid a naming clash with existing NRL side Wests Tigers.

In May 2023, they club relaunched their bid for inclusion in the NRL as the 18th franchise, aiming to represent the southern side of Brisbane. They also abandoned the Firehawks name, instead announcing plans to find a new emblem further in the expansion process.

== Notable players ==
=== 75-Year Dream Team ===
In 2008, the Easts Tigers named their 75 Year "Dream Team", which included players from 1933 to 2007. The team consists of 13 players who have played more than 50 games for the club, chosen by a panel of experts.

=== Internationals ===
- Neville Broadfoot.
- Bill Christie
- Bob Hagan
- Arther Henderson
- Jeff Denman
- John Lang
- John Payne
- Rod Morris

=== Notable juniors ===
- Alan Cann
- Patrick Carrigan
- Tonie Carroll
- Ryley Jacks
- Paul Khan
- Kalyn Ponga
- Christian Welch

== Results ==
=== Queensland Cup ===
Since the inception of the Queensland Cup in 1996, the Tigers have played in 16 finals series, making the Grand Final five times.

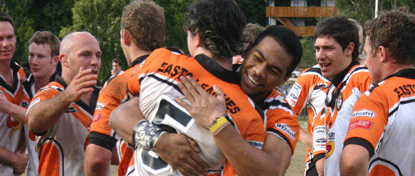
Easts celebrate in the 2006 season after reaching the Semi-Finals for the seventh time in ten years, a feat no other club in the competition has achieved.

- 1996 – 4th
- 1997 – Runners Up – Finished 3rd on ladder
- 1998 – 9th
- 1999 – 5th
- 2000 – 3rd
- 2001 – 4th
- 2002 – 4th
- 2003 – 9th
- 2004 – Runners Up – Finished 3rd on ladder
- 2005 – 8th
- 2006 – 3rd
- 2007 – 5th
- 2008 – 7th
- 2009 – 9th
- 2010 – 11th
- 2011 – 8th
- 2012 – 6th
- 2013 – Runners Up – Finished 3rd on ladder
- 2014 – Runners Up – Finished 3rd on ladder
- 2015 – 4th
- 2016 – 6th
- 2017 – 4th
- 2018 – Runners Up – Finished 5th on ladder
- 2019 – 8th
- 2020 – Season cancelled
- 2021 – 11th
- 2022 – 7th
- 2023 – Premiers - Finished 3rd on ladder

=== Brisbane A Grade / FOGS Cup Results ===
The FOGS Cup is an 6-team competition local Brisbane A Grade competition. It was previously known as the FOGS Cup and was a level below the QRL's Intrust Super Cup. The Easts Tigers have had a team in the Cup since its inception in 2001 and have been the most successful club to date, winning the premiership 8 from 19 seasons.

- 2001 – Premiers
- 2002 – Premiers
- 2003 – Runners-up – 2nd
- 2004 – Premiers
- 2005 – Premiers
- 2006 – 4th
- 2008 – Premiers
- 2009 –
- 2010 –
- 2011 –
- 2012 – Premiers
- 2013 – Premiers
- 2014 – Premiers
- 2015 – 3rd
- 2016 – 6th
- 2017 – 5th
- 2018 – 4th
- 2019 – 4th
- 2020 – Withdrew from the competition

== Honours ==
=== Queensland Cup ===
- Premierships: 2023
- Runners Up: : 1997, 2004, 2013, 2014, 2018

== Records ==
Most Games for Club

- 196, Scott Sipple
- 183, Shane Neumann
- 163, Wade Liddell
- 156, Isaac Kaufmann
- 152, Matthew Zgrajewski

Most Points for Club

- 648, Scott Thorburn
- 553, Cody Walker
- 504, Matt Lockyer
- 394, Billy Walters
- 358, John Wilshere

Most Tries for Club

- 81, Shane Neumann
- 65, Wade Liddell
- 57, Jarrod McInally
- 54, Cody Walker
- 53, Isaac Kaufmann

== See also ==
- National Rugby League reserves affiliations

== On-line references ==
1. Eastern Suburbs Tigers History retrieved 7 December 2005
2. Eastern Suburbs Tigers Statistics retrieved 7 December 2005
