= Gary Clarke (rugby league) =

New Zealand rugby league footballer

Personal information
- Full name: John Gary Clarke
- Born: 13 April 1943 (age 83) New Zealand

Playing information
- Position: Scrum-half
Club
| Years | Team | Pld | T | G | FG | P |
|---|---|---|---|---|---|---|
| 19??–72 | Papanui (CRL) |
Representative
| Years | Team | Pld | T | G | FG | P |
| 1963–71 | Canterbury | 30 |
| 1966–68 | New Zealand | 3 | 0 | 0 | 0 | 0 |
| 1969 | South Island |

Coaching information
Club
| Years | Team | Gms | W | D | L | W% |
| 1971–72 | Papanui (CRL) |
| 1977–78 | Sydenham (CRL) |
| | Total | 0 | 0 | 0 | 0 |
Representative
| Years | Team | Gms | W | D | L | W% |
| 1975 | Canterbury |

Gary Clarke is a New Zealand former rugby league footballer who represented New Zealand in the 1968 World Cup.

== Playing career ==
Clarke played for the New Zealand Schoolboys' side in 1956.

Clarke played for Papanui in the Canterbury Rugby League competition and represented Canterbury. He was first selected for the New Zealand national rugby league team in 1966, coming off the bench in the second test against the Great Britain tourists.

Clarke went on to play three test matches for the Kiwis, including at the 1968 World Cup. In 1969 he was selected for the South Island in the inter-island match.

== Coaching career ==
Clarke was Papanui's player-coach when they won the 1971 and 1972 Canterbury championships. He assisted Woolston in 1973 and later was the head coach of Sydenham in 1977 and 1978.

In 1975 he was the coach of Canterbury. He was a Canterbury selector between 1974 and 1983. He also served as a New Zealand selector between 1983 and 1984.
