= Denis Pittard =

Australia international rugby league footballer

Personal information
- Born: 8 December 1945 (age 80) Melbourne, Victoria, Australia

Playing information
- Height: 167 cm (5 ft 6 in)
- Position: Five-eighth
Club
Years	Team	Pld	T	G	FG	P
1965–67	Western Suburbs	44	14	0	0	42
1968–73	South Sydney	121	56	0	0	168
1974–75	Parramatta	32	11	28	0	89
	Total	197	81	28	0	299
Representative
Years	Team	Pld	T	G	FG	P
1969–72	New South Wales	5	4	0	0	12
1969–70	Australia	2	1	0	0	3
1966–72	NSW City	2	1	0	0	3

Denis John Pittard (born 8 December 1945) is an Australian rugby league footballer, an attacking five-eighth who played in the 1960s and 1970s for the Western Suburbs, South Sydney and Parramatta as well as the Australian national representative side. He was known as "The Sneak", "The Phanthom" and "The Scarlet Pimpernel".

== Playing career ==
Pittard played 46 games with Western Suburbs between 1965 and 1967, scoring 14 tries. He played 121 games with South Sydney between 1967 and 1973, scoring 56 tries. He played in the 1968, 1970 and 1971 victorious Rabbitohs Grand Final teams. He became the first player to win two Rothmans Medals in 1969 and 1971. He played 35 games with Parramatta between 1974 and 1975, scoring 11 tries and 28 goals. Pittard wanted to play another season in 1976 but announced his retirement after receiving an opportunity to study outside Australia.

Pittard represented for Australia in two Test matches (1969–1970) and appeared five times for New South Wales (1969–1972). Pittard toured New Zealand with the Australian side in 1969 and was selected in the 1970 Australian World Cup squad. He is listed on the Australian Players Register as Kangaroo No. 433.

== Sources ==
- The Encyclopedia of Rugby League Players – South Sydney Rabbitohs, Alan Whiticker & Glen Hudson, Bas Publishing, 2005.
