= John Sparnon =

New Zealand international rugby league footballer

Personal information
- Born: 5 June 1943 New Zealand
- Died: 15 November 2014 (aged 71) Pattaya, Thailand

Playing information
- Position: Centre
Club
Years	Team	Pld	T	G	FG	P
	Richmond
	Point Chevalier
	Total	0	0	0	0	0
Representative
Years	Team	Pld	T	G	FG	P
	Auckland
1963	New Zealand	0	0	0	0	0

John Sparnon (died 15 November 2014) was a New Zealand rugby league player who represented New Zealand.

== Playing career ==
Sparnon played for the Richmond and Point Chevalier clubs in the Auckland Rugby League. He represented Auckland. In the 1963 trials, Sparnon scored two tries and was subsequently selected to tour Australia with the New Zealand Kiwis, becoming Kiwi number 419. However he did not play in any test matches during the tour.

He was in the Auckland side which beat Australia 15-14 in 1969.

He died on 15 November 2014 in Pattaya, Thailand.
