= Paul Schultz (rugby league) =

New Zealand international rugby league footballer (1940–2024)

Personal information
- Full name: Paul Joseph Schultz
- Born: 26 January 1940; New Zealand
- Died: 9 February 2024 (aged 84); Ōtāhuhu, New Zealand

Playing information
- Position: Centre, Stand-off
Club
Years	Team	Pld	T	G	FG	P
	Marist (ARL)
	Point Chevalier (ARL)
	Total	0	0	0	0	0
Representative
Years	Team	Pld	T	G	FG	P
1961–69	Auckland
1965–68	New Zealand	9	3	0	0	12
- Relatives: Bill Schultz (brother)

Paul Joseph Schultz (26 January 1940 – 9 February 2024) was a New Zealand rugby league footballer who represented New Zealand in the 1968 World Cup.

== Early life and family ==
Schultz was born on 26 January 1940. His older brother, Bill, was also a rugby league footballer.

== Playing career ==
Schultz played for Marist in the Auckland Rugby League competition and was part of the 1965 and 1966 champion sides. Schultz later played for Point Chevalier. He represented Auckland and was part of the sides that defeated South Africa 10–4 in 1963 and Australia in 1969.

Schultz was first selected for New Zealand in 1965 and played eight test matches in total. He was included in the Kiwis squad for the 1968 World Cup.

== Death ==
Schultz died at Middlemore Hospital, Auckland, on 9 February 2024, at the age of 84.
