= Victor Yates (rugby) =

NZ international rugby union & league footballer

Vic Yates
- Full name: Victor Moses Yates
- Born: 15 June 1939 Kaitaia, New Zealand
- Died: 31 August 2008 (aged 69) Whangārei, New Zealand
- Height: 1.85 m (6 ft 1 in)
- Weight: 93 kg (205 lb)
- School: Kaitaia College
- Notable relative: John Yates (brother)

Rugby union career
- Position: No.8
Senior career
Years	Team	Apps	(Points)
- Rarawa
Provincial / State sides
Years	Team	Apps	(Points)
1959–1965	North Auckland	56	
1961	North Island		
International career
Years	Team	Apps	(Points)
1961–1962	New Zealand	3	(3)
1961–1964	New Zealand Māori		
- Rugby league career

Playing information
Club
Years	Team	Pld	T	G	FG	P
1966–68	Ponsonby
	Auckland
	Total	0	0	0	0	0

Victor Moses Yates (15 June 1939 – 31 August 2008) was a New Zealand rugby footballer who represented his country in rugby union. His brother, John, represented New Zealand in rugby league while his father, Moses, represented North Auckland in rugby union.

== Rugby union career ==
Yates attended Kaitaia College and played rugby union for North Auckland, being part of the side that won the Ranfurly Shield in 1960.

He played nine matches including three Tests for the All Blacks in 1961 and 1962.

In an interview in L'Équipe on the 6 September 2017, French international Pierre Albaladejo named him as the greatest player against whom he ever played.

== Rugby league career ==
He later switched to rugby league, playing for the Ponsonby Ponies and representing Auckland in 1966, 1967 and 1968.

Awards
Preceded by Mack Herewini	Tom French Memorial; Māori rugby union player of the year 1961	Succeeded by Waka Nathan
