= Don Mann =

New Zealand rugby league footballer and coach

Personal information
- Full name: Donald Keio Mann
- Born: 14 March 1942 (age 83) Vavaʻu, Tonga

Playing information
- Position: Prop
Club
Years	Team	Pld	T	G	FG	P
	Glenora Bears
	Ponsonby Ponies
	Total	0	0	0	0	0
Representative
Years	Team	Pld	T	G	FG	P
1964–74	Auckland
1971–74	New Zealand	4	0	0	0	0

Coaching information
Club
Years	Team	Gms	W	D	L	W%
	Ponsonby Ponies
- Relatives: Duane Mann (son); George Mann (nephew); Esau Mann (nephew)

Don Mann is a New Zealand rugby league footballer who represented New Zealand in the 1972 World Cup.

== Playing career ==
Mann played in the Auckland Rugby League competition for both Glenora and Ponsonby United. In 1972, while playing for Ponsonby, Mann won the Hyland Memorial Cup as best coach in the Fox Memorial and in 1973 he won the Rothville Trophy as player of the year.

He represented Auckland and between 1971 and 1974 he played in Four Test matches for the New Zealand national rugby league team. This included the 1972 World Cup.

== Personal life ==
Mann is from a big rugby league family. Two of his sons, Duane and Bart both represented Tonga while Duane also represented New Zealand. Another son, Don Jr, was the New Zealand Warriors general manager. Three of his nephews, Warren, George and Esau, also played international rugby league for Tonga.
