= Don Ladner =

New Zealand rugby league footballer

Personal information
- Full name: Gordon Charles Ladner
- Born: 1948
- Died: 26 January 2009 (aged 60) Reefton, New Zealand

Playing information
- Position: Fullback
Representative
Years	Team	Pld	T	G	FG	P
	West Coast
1969–1970	New Zealand	8	0	34	4	76

Gordon Charles "Don" Ladner (1948 – 26 January 2009) was a New Zealand rugby league player who represented New Zealand. Ladner's position of preference was at fullback.

== Playing career ==
Ladner worked in mines rescue in Reefton.

A West Coast representative, Ladner played 8 tests for the Kiwis from 1969 to 1970, scoring 76 points, all from goal kicking. He played three matches at the 1970 World Cup.

He died in Reefton on 26 January 2009 after suffering a heart attack. He was 60.
