= Bill Noonan =

New Zealand international rugby league footballer (1947–2021)

Personal information
- Full name: William Patrick Noonan
- Born: 14 May 1947 Christchurch, Canterbury, New Zealand
- Died: 30 December 2021 (aged 74) Sydney, New South Wales, Australia

Playing information
- Position: Prop, Hooker
Club
Years	Team	Pld	T	G	FG	P
	Linwood Keas
1970–78	Canterbury-Bankstown	161	9	0	0	27
1979–80	Newtown Jets	35	2	0	0	6
	Total	196	11	0	0	33
Representative
Years	Team	Pld	T	G	FG	P
1965–69	Canterbury	25
1965	South Island
1967	Southern Zone
1967–69	New Zealand	3	1	0	0	3
- Source: As of 25 July 2006

William Patrick Noonan (Irish: Uilliam Pádraig Ó Nuanáin; 14 May 1947 – 30 December 2021) was a professional rugby league footballer who played in the 1960s, 1970s and 1980s. He played for the Linwood Keas, the Canterbury-Bankstown Bulldogs, the Newtown Jets and for the New Zealand national side. He played for Canterbury against Australia as an 18-year-old in 1965. Noonan played in seven games (one Test) on the New Zealand national rugby league team 1967 tour of Australia and in two home Test matches against Australia in 1969. He also represented the South Island, Southern Zone and various age group sides before he was signed by the Bulldogs from the New Zealand Rugby League for a $6,000 transfer fee in 1970. He was Peter Moore's first signing for the Bulldogs. He played for Canterbury-Bankstown in their loss in the 1974 NSWRFL season's grand final.

== Background ==
Bill Noonan was born in Canterury Region into an Irish-New Zealander Roman Catholic family.
