= Phillip Orchard =

New Zealand international rugby league footballer (1948–2018)

Personal information
- Full name: Phillip Charles Orchard
- Born: 28 July 1948
- Died: 29 July 2018 (aged 70)

Playing information
- Position: Wing
Club
Years	Team	Pld	T	G	FG	P
19??–71	Ngongotaha Chiefs
1972–75	St. George (WRL)
	Total	0	0	0	0	0
Representative
Years	Team	Pld	T	G	FG	P
19??–71	Bay of Plenty
1969–75	New Zealand	21	15	0	0	45
1972–75	Wellington	17
- Relatives: Robert Orchard (brother)

Phillip Charles Orchard (28 July 1948 – 29 July 2018) was a New Zealand rugby league footballer who represented New Zealand in the 1972 and 1975 World Cups. He was later named in the New Zealand Rugby League's Team of the Century. His brother Robert was also a New Zealand representative.

== Playing career ==
Orchard played with the Ngongotaha Chiefs in the Bay of Plenty Rugby League alongside his three brothers, Robert, Eddie and John. He was a Bay of Plenty representative.

Orchard first made the New Zealand national rugby league team in 1969 and remained a New Zealand representative until 1975, he played in 21 test matches for New Zealand including at two World Cup. His try in the 1971 tour of Great Britain secured New Zealand's first series win on British soil since the 1907-08 All Golds.

In 1972 Orchard moved to Wellington, joining the St. George club. He scored 29 tries and 30 goals for a total of 141 points in his first season for the club. In 1975 Orchard scored a Wellington club record of 43 tries. Orchard also represented the district in inter-provincial league, playing in 17 matches.

He played for the New Zealand Māori side in 1972.

== Legacy ==
As of 2010, Orchard's 15 tries for the Kiwis puts him at sixth equal on the try-scoring charts.

He was named one of New Zealand Rugby League's "Legends of League" in 2001 and in 2007 was named in the New Zealand Rugby League's Team of the Century.

In 2012 he was named in the Wellington Rugby League's Team of the Century.
