= Oscar Danielson (rugby league) =

NZ international rugby league footballer

Personal information
- Full name: Oscar Gustav Danielson
- Born: 2 February 1945 (age 81) Apia, Western Samoa

Playing information
- Position: Prop
Club
Years	Team	Pld	T	G	FG	P
	Marist Saints (ARL)
1970–72	Newtown Jets	44	4	0	0	12
	Total	44	4	0	0	12
Representative
Years	Team	Pld	T	G	FG	P
	Auckland
1964–68	New Zealand Māori	2	0	0	0	0
1967–69	New Zealand	5	1	0	0	3

Oscar Danielson is a former New Zealand international rugby league footballer who played in the 1960s and 1970s. He played for the Kiwis in the 1968 World Cup.

== Background ==
Danielson was born in Apia, Western Samoa.

== New Zealand career ==
Danielson played for the Marist Saints in the Auckland Rugby League competition and represented Auckland.

Born in Samoa, this qualified him for the New Zealand Māori side under the rules at the time and he played for them twice, in 1964 when they defeated France 7-5 and in 1968 against NSW Country. Danielson was also part of the Auckland side that lost 11-12 to the touring Great Britain team in 1966.

He was first selected for the New Zealand national rugby league team in 1967 and went on to play in five test matches over three seasons, including at the 1968 World Cup in Australia and New Zealand.

== Newtown career ==
In 1970 Oscar Danielson joined the Newtown Jets in the New South Wales Rugby League premiership on a $4000 a year contract. Newtown paid the New Zealand Rugby League $12,000 to sign him. He played with Newtown for three seasons, under coach Harry Bath.

He is believed to have been the first Samoan born player to compete in the NSWRL competition.

In 1973 he moved to a captain-coach role at Corrimal Cougars and he stayed at the club for many years.
