= Eddie Heatley =

New Zealand rugby league footballer

Personal information
- Full name: Edwin Duncan Heatley
- Born: 26 August 1948 (age 77) New Zealand

Playing information
- Position: Loose forward
Club
Years	Team	Pld	T	G	FG	P
	Otahuhu
1973–74	North Sydney	27	1	0	0	3
	Total	27	1	0	0	3
Representative
Years	Team	Pld	T	G	FG	P
	Auckland
1970–71	New Zealand	3	0	0	0	0

Eddie Heatley is a New Zealand former rugby league footballer who represented New Zealand in the 1970 World Cup.

== Playing career ==
Heatley played for the Otahuhu Leopards in the Auckland Rugby League competition and also represented Auckland. In 1970 he was selected for the New Zealand national rugby league team and played at the 1970 World Cup. He was also involved in the 1971 victory over Australia at Carlaw Park. In 1971 he won the Bert Humphries Medal as most improved forward in the ARL competition.

He spent the 1973 and 1974 seasons with the North Sydney Bears in the NSWRL Premiership.
