= Ron Costello =

Australia international rugby league footballer

Personal information
- Full name: Ron Costello
- Born: 7 November 1942 (age 84) Shellharbour, New South Wales, Australia

Playing information
- Position: Second-row
Club
Years	Team	Pld	T	G	FG	P
1964–65	Western Suburbs	18	1	0	0	4
1970–72	Canterbury	61	11	0	0	33
	Total	79	12	0	0	37
Representative
Years	Team	Pld	T	G	FG	P
1969–71	Australia	3	0	0	0	0
- As of 6 February 2023

Ron Costello (born 1942) was an Australian professional rugby league footballer who played in the 1960s and 1970s. He played for the Western Suburbs Magpies, Canterbury-Bankstown Bulldogs, New South Wales and for the Australian national side.

== Playing career ==
From Shellharbour on the South Coast of New South Wales, Costello went to Shellharbour Public School (1948–1954), and then went to the Western Suburbs Magpies in Sydney and played lower grades in 1964–1965. He was signed by Collegians Wollongong RLFC (Illawarra Division) in 1967 by then coach Kevin Smyth (a former Kangaroo 1963). Collegians won the Club Championship and First Grade Premiership that season with Costello representing New South Wales. Costello played at Collegians in 1968 and in 1969 he was selected to play for Australia, becoming Kangaroo No.430, and toured New Zealand and appeared in one test. He was then signed by Canterbury-Bankstown Bulldogs and played there for three seasons between 1970 and 1972. In 1970 he represented Australia again in the third Ashes test against Great Britain. At the end of that year he was selected to play in the World Cup. His final test appearance was against New Zealand in 1971. He returned to the Illawarra Competition in 1973 with the Port Kembla Club. He finished his career at Shellharbour in 1980 where it started.

Costello was named in the Illawarra Rugby League Team of the Century in 2010.

== Sources ==
- Whiticker, Alan & Hudson, Glen (2006) The Encyclopedia of Rugby League Players, Gavin Allen Publishing, Sydney
