= Ray Williams (rugby league) =

New Zealand international rugby league footballer

Personal information
- Born: 26 March 1946 (age 79); New Zealand

Playing information
- Position: Loose forward
Club
Years	Team	Pld	T	G	FG	P
	Richmond Rovers
Representative
Years	Team	Pld	T	G	FG	P
1968–72	Auckland
1970	New Zealand	1	0	0	0	0

Ray Williams is a New Zealand rugby league footballer who represented New Zealand.

== Playing career ==
Williams played for the Richmond club and first represented Auckland in 1968.

In 1970 he won the Lipscombe Cup as the Auckland Rugby League's sportsman of the year.

He was selected for the New Zealand side that year, coming off the bench in their 16-33 loss to Great Britain.

In 1971 he was part of the Auckland side that defeated Australia 15-14.
