= Roy Christian =

New Zealand rugby league player and minister (1944–2024)

Roy Christian MBE
- Born: Fletcher Roy Christian; 10 October 1943; Auckland, New Zealand
- Died: 19 November 2024 (aged 81)
- Rugby league career

Playing information
- Position: Wing, Centre
Club
Years	Team	Pld	T	G	FG	P
19??	Otahuhu
Representative
Years	Team	Pld	T	G	FG	P
19??	Auckland
1964	New Zealand Māori
1965–72	New Zealand	32	5	0	0	15

Fletcher Roy Christian, MBE (10 October 1943 – 19 November 2024) was a New Zealand professional rugby league footballer who played in the 1960s and 1970s. A centre, he captained New Zealand in the sport. Christian also captained the New Zealand Māori rugby league team.

== Early life and family ==
Christian was born in Auckland on 10 October 1943 to Norfolk Island parents, Leaonard Beaumont and Anna Matilda Christian. He was a direct descendant of Fletcher Christian, a figure in the 1789 Mutiny on the Bounty. He was educated at Otahuhu College and the University of Auckland.

In 1966, Christian married Robyn Cheryl Plant, and the couple went on to have two children.

== Rugby league ==
During the 1965 Kangaroo tour of New Zealand Christian played on the wing in both Test matches against Australia. While playing for Otahuhu in 1966, Christian was awarded the Lipscombe Cup for Premier One sportsman of the year. However, injury caused him to miss the 1968 World Cup.

During the 1969 Kangaroo tour of New Zealand Christian played on the wing in the 2nd Test victory against Australia. He was then part of the Auckland side that defeated the tourists. He was appointed captain of the New Zealand national side in 1970 and played in that year's World Cup.

During the 1971 Kangaroo tour of New Zealand Christian captained New Zealand from centre in the Test match victory against Australia at Carlaw Park. Also in 1971, his Kiwis side became the first New Zealand touring team to win a test series in Britain. The 1972 World Cup was the last time Christian represented New Zealand. He retired with little fanfare as no test matches were scheduled for 1973. He had played in 74 matches for the Kiwis, including 32 tests. After retirement Christian served as the Otahuhu Leopards chairman.

In the 1972 Queen's Birthday Honours, Christian was appointed a Member of the Order of the British Empire, for services to rugby league football. In 2007, he was inducted as one of the New Zealand Rugby League's "Legends of League".

== Presbyterian minister ==
Christian studied at the Presbyterian School of Ministry at Knox College in Dunedin, and became a minister of the Presbyterian Church in 1984.

== Death ==
Christian died on 19 November 2024, at the age of 81.
