= Robert Orchard (rugby league) =

New Zealand international rugby league footballer

Personal information
- Full name: Robert Ian P. Orchard
- Born: 1956 New Zealand
- Died: 10 March 2020 (aged 63–64)

Playing information
- Position: Prop, Second-row
Club
Years	Team	Pld	T	G	FG	P
≤1965–66	Ngongotaha
1967–72	Ellerslie
	Redcliffe
	Mt Isa
	Mackay
	Wynnum-Manly
	Total	0	0	0	0	0
Representative
Years	Team	Pld	T	G	FG	P
≤1965–66	Bay of Plenty
1965–72	New Zealand	18	5	4	0	23
1967–72	Auckland
1972	New Zealand Māori
1973	Queensland	2	0	0	0	0
- Relatives: Phillip Orchard (brother)

Robert Orchard is a New Zealand former professional rugby league footballer who played in the 1960s and 1970s. He played at representative level for New Zealand, Bay of Plenty, Auckland and Queensland, as a prop, or second-row.

== Playing career ==
Orchard originally played for Ngongotaha and represented Bay of Plenty.

In 1967 Orchard moved to the Ellerslie club in the Auckland Rugby League competition and became an Auckland representative. In 1968, Auckland defeated Canterbury 29-15 during Queen's Birthday weekend.

He played for the New Zealand Māori side in 1972.

In 1973 Orchard moved to Queensland and represented the state, playing two games against New South Wales. While in Queensland, Orchard spent time with Redcliffe, Mt Isa, Mackay and Wynnum-Manly.

== International honours ==
Orchard first represented New Zealand while at Bay of Plenty in 1965 against Great Britain and France (3-matches). He again played for the Kiwis in 1966 against Great Britain and, while at Auckland, in 1967 against Australia (2-matches), in 1970 against Great Britain (3-matches), in 1971 against Australia, Great Britain (3-matches), and France (3-matches), and in 1972 against Australia.

== Personal life ==
Orchard is the brother of the fellow New Zealand international Phillip, two other brothers, Eddie and John, both also played for Ngongotaha.
