= Bernie Lowther =

New Zealand international rugby league footballer

Personal information
- Full name: Bernard Ross Lowther
- Born: 15 August 1950 (age 76)

Playing information
- Position: Centre, Wing
Club
Years	Team	Pld	T	G	FG	P
	Richmond (ARL)
1972–74	Canterbury-Bankstown	56	27	0	0	81
1975–76	South Sydney	42	14	0	0	42
	Total	98	41	0	0	123
Representative
Years	Team	Pld	T	G	FG	P
	Auckland
1970–71	New Zealand	8	0	0	0	0

Bernard Ross Lowther (born 1950) is a New Zealand former rugby league footballer who played in the 1970s. A New Zealand international three-quarter, he played club football for the Richmond Rovers in the Auckland Rugby League competition and in Sydney's NSWRFL Premiership for Canterbury-Bankstown and South Sydney. His father, Bernard Lowther (senior) also played for Richmond in the early to mid 1940s and played for Auckland.

Lowther currently resides in South East Queensland and is a member of Carbrook Golf Club, he is a regular participant in Carbrook's Wednesday & Saturday competitions playing off a solid 16 handicap, which he will be looking to improve on after retiring earlier this year (2014).
