= Bob McGuinn =

New Zealand international rugby league footballer

Personal information
- Full name: Robert Christopher McGuinn
- Born: 6 June 1948 (age 78) Auckland, New Zealand

Playing information
- Position: Wing
Club
Years	Team	Pld	T	G	FG	P
	Point Chevalier
	Otahuhu
	Total	0	0	0	0	0
Representative
Years	Team	Pld	T	G	FG	P
	Auckland
1970–71	New Zealand	3	0	0	0	0

Bob McGuinn is a New Zealand former rugby league footballer who represented New Zealand in the 1970 World Cup.

== Playing career ==
McGuinn played for the Point Chevalier Pirates in the Auckland Rugby League competition and also represented Auckland. In 1970 he was selected for the New Zealand national rugby league team and went on to play in two matches at the 1970 World Cup.

In 1971 McGuinn moved clubs, joining the Otahuhu Leopards. He played one more test match for the Kiwis in 1971.
