= Ernie Wiggs =

New Zealand international rugby league footballer and coach

Personal information
- Full name: Ernest David Wiggs
- Born: 17 December 1942 New Zealand
- Died: 10 October 2014 (aged 71)

Playing information
- Position: Wing, Prop, Lock
Club
Years	Team	Pld	T	G	FG	P
	Otahuhu Leopards
	Mount Albert Lions
	Total	0	0	0	0	0
Representative
Years	Team	Pld	T	G	FG	P
	Auckland
1964–68	New Zealand	5	1	20	0	43

Coaching information
Club
Years	Team	Gms	W	D	L	W%
	Mangere East Hawks
	Otahuhu Leopards
	Total	0	0	0	0

Ernest David Wiggs (1940 or 1941 – 10 October 2014) was a New Zealand rugby league player who represented New Zealand in the 1968 World Cup.

== Playing career ==
Wiggs played for Otahuhu in the Auckland Rugby League competition. An Auckland representative, Wiggs was selected for New Zealand in 1964 for a Test against France at Prop. He was then selected to play Great Britain at Lock in 1966 before being included in the 1968 World Cup squad as a Winger. Wiggs also won the New Zealand Rugby League's player of the year award that year.

Between 1967 and 1970 he won the Painter Rosebowl Trophy four times as the leading points scorer in the Auckland Rugby League competition. Wiggs was also part of the 1969 Auckland side that defeated Australia 15–14. Wiggs again won the trophy in 1973, however by then he was playing for the Mount Albert Lions.

Wiggs later coached both the Otahuhu Leopards and the Mangere East Hawks. In 1978 the Wiggs-coached Hawks made the Fox Memorial grand final, losing to Otahuhu.

Wiggs died in 2014, and he was buried at Waikumete Cemetery.
