= Graeme Cooksley =

New Zealand international rugby league footballer and coach

Personal information
- Full name: Graeme Roy Cooksley
- Born: 13 November 1949 (age 76) New Zealand

Playing information
- Height: 5 ft 4 in (1.63 m)
- Weight: 10 st (64 kg)
- Position: Scrum-half
Club
| Years | Team | Pld | T | G | FG | P |
|---|---|---|---|---|---|---|
| 19??–77 | Eastern Suburbs |
| 1978 | Kaiapoi |
| 1979 | Addington |
| | Total | 0 | 0 | 0 | 0 | 0 |
Representative
| Years | Team | Pld | T | G | FG | P |
| 1967–75 | Canterbury | 47 | 31 | 0 | 0 | 93 |
| | Southern Zone |
| 1969–72 | New Zealand | 13 | 1 | 0 | 0 | 3 |
| 1974 | South Island |

Coaching information
Club
| Years | Team | Gms | W | D | L | W% |
| 1975–77 | Eastern Suburbs |

Graeme Cooksley is a New Zealand former rugby league footballer who represented New Zealand in the 1970 and 1972 World Cups.

== Playing career ==
Cooksley played for the New Zealand Schoolboys' side in 1962 and 1963. He played for New Zealand under-23 in 1969 and New Zealand XIII in 1971.

Cooksley played for the Eastern Suburbs club in the Canterbury Rugby League competition and represented Canterbury, making his debut against Otago in 1967. He played for the Southern Zone against Northern Zone in 1969 and was first selected for the New Zealand national rugby league team that same year for two test matches against Australia. He played in twenty two games, including thirteen test matches for New Zealand between 1969 and 1972, and was included in the squads for the 1970 and 1972 World Cups and the 1971 tour of Great Britain and France.

After the 1972 World Cup, he spent a season with French club Avignon.

In 1974 Cooksley played for the South Island against the touring Great Britain Lions. In 1975 he played for Canterbury when they upset Auckland 15–14.

Between 1975 and 1977 he was the player-coach of Eastern Suburbs before spending a season each with Kaiapoi and Addington.
