= Henry Tatana =

New Zealand international rugby league footballer and coach

Personal information
- Full name: Henry Nardy Tatana
- Born: 31 March 1945 Auckland, New Zealand
- Died: 13 June 1998 (aged 53) Brisbane, Queensland, Australia

Playing information
- Position: Prop
Club
Years	Team	Pld	T	G	FG	P
	Glenora Bears
	Mount Albert Lions
1972–74	Canterbury-Bankstown	47	3	156	0	321
1975–76	St George Dragons	43	4	105	0	222
1977–??	Cessnock
	Total	90	7	261	0	543
Representative
Years	Team	Pld	T	G	FG	P
	Auckland
1967–71	New Zealand	9	1	23	0	49

Henry Nardy Tatana (31 March 1945 – 13 June 1998) was a New Zealand rugby league player. He played for the Glenora Bears, Canterbury-Bankstown, St. George, Cessnock Goannas and the New Zealand national side.

== Playing career ==
Tatana began his career playing in the Auckland Rugby League for the Glenora Bears and the Mount Albert Lions and representing Auckland. During this time he played in nine Test matches for the New Zealand national rugby league team.

In his later years, Tatana moved to Sydney, playing five seasons in the NSWRL First Grade competition. He played for Canterbury-Bankstown from 1972 to 1974, before joining St. George for two seasons in 1975 and 1976, playing under captain-coach Graeme Langlands. The Dragons paid Canterbury $5000, with Tatana earning $12,000 per year. Tatana was a prop forward in the Dragons' 1975 Grand Final team.

A fine goalkicker and prop forward, he was St George's top scorer in 1976 (his final season there), with 105 points.

Tatana captain–coached Newcastle Rugby League club Cessnock Goannas to a grand final win in 1977, his first year with them. He was president of the Cessnock club between 1984 and 1986. An award bearing his name is presented by the Cessnock Goannas each year.

== Representative career ==
Tatana was a New Zealand Kiwi international player and played in the 1968 World Cup. He played 33 matches for New Zealand, including 10 tests, between 1967 and 1971.

== Later years ==
Tatana died in Brisbane on 13 June 1998, age 53.
