= Tony Kriletich =

New Zealand rugby league footballer

Personal information
- Full name: Anthony Peter Kriletich
- Born: 22 March 1944 Auckland, New Zealand
- Died: 21 May 2016 (aged 72) Auckland, New Zealand

Playing information
- Position: Second-row, Loose forward
Club
Years	Team	Pld	T	G	FG	P
1963–74	Marist (ARL)
Representative
Years	Team	Pld	T	G	FG	P
1965–74	Auckland
1965–72	New Zealand	22	2	0	0	6

Anthony Peter "Tony" Kriletich (22 March 1944 – 21 May 2016) was a New Zealand rugby league player who represented New Zealand in the 1968 and 1970 World Cups.

== Early life and family ==
Born in the Auckland suburb of Point Chevalier on 22 March 1944, Kriletich was the son of Ivan "Jack" Kriletich and Kathleen Frances Kriletich (née Matutinovich). He was educated at Sacred Heart College.

== Playing career ==
Kriletich played for the Marist club in the Auckland Rugby League competition and represented Auckland. He won the Lipscombe Cup in 1965 as the ARL's sportsman of the year and the Rothville Trophy in 1968 and 1970 as the player of the year.

Kriletich made his debut for the New Zealand national rugby league team in 1965, coming on against Australia after Eddie Moore suffered a broken nose. He participated in the 1968 World Cup in Australia and New Zealand and the 1970 World Cup in Great Britain. He finished his career having played 47 games for New Zealand, including 22 consecutive test matches between 1967 and 1972. Kriletich captained the Kiwis once; against Great Britain at the 1968 Rugby League World Cup.

Kriletich also was part of the Auckland sides that defeated Australia 15–14 in 1969 and Great Britain 11–2 in 1974.

== Later years ==
Kriletich was an inaugural inductee to the Auckland Rugby League Hall of Fame in 2015.

Kriletich died at Middlemore Hospital, Auckland, on 21 May 2016.
