= Gary Woollard =

New Zealand rugby league footballer (1942–2021)

Personal information
- Full name: Gary John Woollard
- Born: 15 August 1942 Waiuku, New Zealand
- Died: 15 August 2021 (aged 79) Auckland, New Zealand

Playing information
- Position: Stand-off
Club
Years	Team	Pld	T	G	FG	P
	Miramar (WRL)
	Mount Albert Lions
	Total	0	0	0	0	0
Representative
Years	Team	Pld	T	G	FG	P
	Wellington
1963–71	New Zealand	10	2	0	0	6
	Auckland

Gary John Woollard (15 August 1942 – 15 August 2021) was a New Zealand professional rugby league footballer who represented New Zealand, including at the 1970 World Cup.

== Playing career ==
After growing up in Auckland, Woollard moved to Wellington in 1961, joining the Miramar club in the Wellington Rugby League competition. Miramar won the Wellington premiership in 1962, again in 1964 and shared a third with Waterside in 1966.

Woollard made his debut for the New Zealand national rugby league team in 1963 as a Wellington representative. He next played for the Kiwis in 1967, by which time he was now representing Auckland. He played a total of ten test matches for New Zealand, and was part of the squad that competed at the 1970 World Cup.

Woollard played for New Zealand in 1969 when they defeated Australia 2–1 in a Test series. He was also part of the Kiwis 1971 tour of Great Britain and France, winning 2–1 in Britain and 2–0, with one draw, in France. It was the Kiwis first Test win on British soil since the 1907–08 All Golds tour.

In 1969, while playing for the Mount Albert Lions, Woollard won the Lipscombe Cup as the Auckland Rugby League Sportsman of the Year.

Woollard was married to Elizabeth Woollard. He had three children.
