= Mike McClennan =

RL coach and former NZ international rugby league footballer (1944–2019)

Personal information
- Full name: Michael James McClennan
- Born: 26 January 1944
- Died: October 2019 (aged 75)

Playing information
- Height: 1.78 m (5 ft 10 in)
- Weight: 85 kg (13 st 5 lb)
- Position: Fullback, Centre
Club
Years	Team	Pld	T	G	FG	P
1970–70	Ponsonby
1971–??	Mount Wellington
	Total	0	0	0	0	0
Representative
Years	Team	Pld	T	G	FG	P
	Auckland
1971	New Zealand	2

Coaching information
Club
Years	Team	Gms	W	D	L	W%
1980–88	Mt Albert Lions
1989	Northcote Tigers
1990–93	St. Helens
	Total	0	0	0	0
Representative
Years	Team	Gms	W	D	L	W%
1995	Tonga	2	0	1	1	0
- Relatives: Brian McClennan (son)

Michael James McClennan (26 January 1944 – October 2019) was a New Zealand rugby league footballer who played for the New Zealand national team. McClennan went on to coach Auckland rugby league team and St Helens and also internationally with Tonga.

== Playing career ==
McClennan played in the Auckland Rugby League premiership for the Ponsonby Ponies and represented the New Zealand national rugby league team in two Tests in 1971. He won the Tetley Trophy in 1970 as leading try-scorer in the Auckland Rugby League competition.

== Coaching career ==
During the 1980s McClennan coached the Mt Albert Lions to six Auckland Rugby League Fox Memorial Grand finals, winning five. He was also the New Zealand national rugby league team assistant coach under Graham Lowe. In 1989 he moved to Northcote and won the Fox Memorial with them that year. In 1990 he was appointed the St. Helens head coach. He coached the team between February 1990 and December 1993.

McClennan also was the coach of the Tonga team at the 1995 World Cup. Tonga failed to win a match at the World Cup but earned respect after they narrowly lost to the New Zealand team by a single point. He was also the Auckland Warriors assistant coach in 1999.

In 2000 he served as the technical advisor to the South Africa team at the 2000 World Cup.

== Family ==
He is the father of former New Zealand national rugby league team coach Brian McClennan.

== Disappearance and death ==
McClennan suffered from dementia and disappeared from his rest home at Orewa on 16 October 2019. His body was discovered six days later, on 22 October.
