= 1962 New Zealand rugby league season =

Seasons
- ← 1961 1963 →

The 1962 New Zealand rugby league season was the 55th season of rugby league that had been played in New Zealand.

== International competitions ==
New Zealand defeated Great Britain 2–0 in a Test series. New Zealand won the Test matches 19-0 and 27–8, both at Carlaw Park. New Zealand were captained by Mel Cooke and included Tony Smith, Brian Reidy, Reese Griffiths, Graham Kennedy, Neville Denton, Bill Snowden, Jim Bond, Jock Butterfield, Maunga Emery, Ron Ackland, Sam Edwards, Roger Bailey, Jack Fagan and Don Hammond.

Great Britain defeated the Bay of Plenty 81-14 and Canterbury 26–5.

Auckland defeated Great Britain 46–13 on 13 August at Carlaw Park. This was the first televised rugby league match in New Zealand as one hour of edited highlights were shown on AKTV2 that night, other regional channels showed the highlights the following week. Auckland included; Gary Phillips, Brian Reidy, Roger Bailey, captain Bill Sorensen, Neville Denton, Doug Ellwood, Bill Snowden, Rata Harrison, John Lasher, Graham Mattson, Arthur Carson, Ron Ackland and Bruce Castle.

Mel Cooke won the New Zealand Rugby League's player of the year award. Ron McGregor was first elected to the New Zealand Rugby League's board, serving as the minor league's delegate.

== National competitions ==
=== Northern Union Cup ===
West Coast held the Northern Union Cup at the end of the season after they had defeated Canterbury 6–4 to win the trophy. Canterbury had been reduced to 12 men for the last 35 minutes of the match due to injury.

Earlier in the season, Canterbury had defeated Auckland 16–13 on Queen's Birthday Monday to win the trophy. It was the first time Canterbury had defeated Auckland since 1925.

=== Inter-island competition ===
The South Island defeated the North Island 10–0 at the Show Grounds.

The South Island included John Hibbs, Jim Bond, George Menzies, Jock Butterfield, Mita Mohi, Pat White and Mel Cooke.

=== Inter-district competition ===
Canterbury included Tony Smith, John Bray, George H Turner, Mita Mohi, captain Mel Cooke, Jim Bond, John Walshe, Allen Amer, Gary Blackler, Pat White and Bob Irvine.

Auckland included Brian Reidy, Neville Denton, Roger Bailey, Reg Cooke, Ken McCracken, Brian Campbell, Eric Carson, Sam Edwards, Len Morgan, Rata Harrison, Ron Ackland and captain Don Hammond.

The West Coast included George Menzies.

=== National Club competition ===
Eastern United (Auckland) won the Rothmans tournament, defeating Hornby (Canterbury) 25–2 in the final.

== Club competitions ==
=== Auckland ===
Eastern United & Glenora shared the Auckland Rugby League's Fox Memorial Trophy, drawing 17-all in the final. Eastern United also won the Rukutai Shield and Roope Rooster while Glenora captured the Stormont Shield, defeating Eastern 13–10.

Ron Ackland played for Eastern United.

=== Wellington ===
Miramar won the Wellington Rugby League's Appleton Shield.

=== Canterbury ===
Hornby won the Canterbury Rugby League's Massetti Cup. Mel Cooke was Hornby's captain-coach.

George H Turner and Gary Blackler played for Papanui.

=== Other Competitions ===
Jock Butterfield was the captain-coach of Brunner in the West Coast Rugby League competition. Runanga defeated Hornby 18–16 to win the Thacker Shield.
