= 1963 New Zealand rugby league season =

Seasons
- ← 1962 1964 →

The 1963 New Zealand rugby league season was the 56th season of rugby league that had been played in New Zealand.

== International competitions ==
New Zealand toured Australia, losing the series 1–2. The team was coached by Bill Telford and included Gary Phillips, Neville Denton, Roger Bailey, Graham Kennedy, Brian Reidy, Jim Bond, Bill Snowden, Brian Lee, Gary Blackler, Maunga Emery, Don Hammond, Ron Ackland, captain Mel Cooke, Jack Fagan, Ken McCracken, Sam Edwards and Jock Butterfield.

South Africa also toured the country, being met by 40 protesters when they arrived in the country. They upset New Zealand 4–3 at Carlaw Park. However, the match was not granted Test match status as the South Africans had enlisted two Australian guest players due to their serious injury toll sustained on the Australian leg of the tour. The South Africans were assisted by Maurie Robertson while in New Zealand.

The South Africans had previously lost 12–8 to the South Island. The South Island included Pat White, Brian Langton, Jim Bond, Bob Irvine, Jim Fisher, Colin McMaster, Mita Mohi and Mel Cooke.

They then defeated Wellington before losing 4–10 to Auckland. The Auckland team was a virtual B side as it did not include players in camp with the Kiwis. The team included Roy Christian, Doug Ellwood, captain Roger Tait, Paul Schultz and Graham Mattson.

The New South Wales Rugby League's Parramatta Eels toured Auckland. They first defeated Glenora 13-11 before losing to both Eastern United and Southern Districts 20–13, both at Carlaw Park.

The New Zealand Schoolboy's side defeated their New South Wales counterparts 6–3 at the Show Grounds.

Graham Kennedy won the New Zealand Rugby League's player of the year award.

== National competitions ==
=== Northern Union Cup ===
Canterbury held the Northern Union Cup at the end of the season, after they had defeated the West Coast 38–9 in Christchurch. Canterbury then successfully defended the trophy three times, drawing 10-all with Auckland at the Epsom Show Grounds, defeating Waikato 15–0 at Davies Park in Huntly and the West Coast 7–5 at Wingham Park in Greymouth.

=== Inter-district competition ===
Canterbury defeated Otago 53–0 in Dunedin.

Auckland were coached by Bruce Robertson and included Ron Ackland, Ken McCracken and Reg Cooke.

Canterbury included Brian Langton, John Bray, Pat White, Mita Mohi, captain Mel Cooke, John Walshe, Bob Irvine, Jim Fisher, Gary Blackler, Ian Drayton and Jim Bond.

Graham Kennedy played for the West Coast.

=== National Club competition ===
Southern Districts (Auckland) won the Rothmans tournament, defeating Linwood (Canterbury) 15–2 in the final. Southern had defeated Te Mahoe (Bay of Plenty) 53–4, Ngaruawahia (Waikato) 26-9 and Waitara (Taranaki) 53–17.

== Club competitions ==
=== Auckland ===
Eastern United won the Auckland Rugby League's Fox Memorial Trophy, Roope Rooster and Stormont Shield. Southern Districts won the Rukutai Shield. Eastern United defeated Southern Districts 8–0 in the Fox Memorial final.

This was the last year of the Auckland Rugby League's "district scheme", as the clubs voted to abandon it the following season.

Roger Tait and Graham Mattson played for Glenora while Ron Ackland, Reg Cooke, Doug Ellwood, Ken McCracken and Ray Sinel played for Eastern United. Ken George, Ernie Wiggs and Roy Christian played for Southern Districts.

=== Wellington ===
Korodale and Marist shared the Wellington Rugby League's Appleton Shield.

Wellington Marist and Christchurch Marist played against each other on 13 April in Wellington. The match was the first live rugby league telecast in the country.

=== Canterbury ===
Linwood won the Canterbury Rugby League's Massetti Cup.

A match was played in Kaikoura between Shirley and Papanui during the season.

Mel Cooke was Hornby's captain-coach while Linwood included Lory Blanchard, who retired and became a selector in 1964.

=== Other competitions ===
Jock Butterfield was the captain-coach of Brunner in the West Coast Rugby League competition. Brunner won the championship that year.

Linwood defeated Brunner 10–6 to win the Thacker Shield for Canterbury for the first time since 1956.
