= 1961 New Zealand rugby league season =

Seasons
- ← 1960 1962 →

The 1961 New Zealand rugby league season was the 54th season of rugby league that had been played in New Zealand.

== International competitions ==
New Zealand drew a Test series 1-all with Australia. The New Zealand squad was coached by Des White and included; Gary Phillip, Brian Reidy, George P Turner, Tom Hadfield, Reg Cooke, George Menzies, Graeme Farrar, Jim Patterson, Jock Butterfield, Maunga Emery, Don Hammond, captain Ron Ackland, Bill Snowden, Tom Reid and Mel Cooke.

Australia defeated New Zealand Māori 25–13, Wellington 66–3, a National youth combination 9–4, the West Coast 27–7, Taranaki 34-0 and Waikato 26–8. However, in the Kangaroos last tour game, Auckland defeated Australia 13–8 in front of 17,000 fans at Carlaw Park. It was Auckland's first victory over Australia. Auckland included; Gary Phillips, Tom Hadfield, George P Turner, Bill Sorensen, Neville Denton, Doug Ellwood, Bill Snowden, Maunga Emery, Jim Patterson, Tom Reid, Ron Ackland, Ted Johnson and Bruce Castle.

The Kiwis then toured Great Britain and France, losing the series to Great Britain 1-2 and winning the series against France 1-0 after two drawn Tests. The team was coached by Bill Telford and included; Jack Fagan, Tom Hadfield, Reg Cooke, Brian Reidy, Roger Bailey, Bill Snowden, Jim Bond, Sam Edwards, Jock Butterfield, Maunga Emery, captain Don Hammond, Brian Lee, Graham Kennedy, Bruce Castle, Billy Harrison, Jim Patterson, Ken McCracken, Reg Hart and Mel Cooke. Original selections, Test captain Ron Ackland, Neville Denton and Gary Phillips withdrew from the tour squad due a dispute over allowances.

Gary Phillips won the New Zealand Rugby League's player of the year award.

== National competitions ==
=== Northern Union Cup ===
Auckland again held the Northern Union Cup at the end of the season. Auckland defeated Canterbury 38-4 and the West Coast 16–7.

=== Inter-district competition ===
Auckland were coached by Des White and included Gary Phillips, Neville Denton, Ron Ackland, Tom Hadfield, Rata Harrison, Laurie Olliff, Bruce Castle, Bill Sorensen, Paul Schultz, Don Hammond and Reg Cooke.

== Club competitions ==
=== Auckland ===
Eastern United won the Auckland Rugby League's Fox Memorial Trophy, Rukutai Shield, Roope Rooster and Stormont Shield. They defeated Glenora 24–7 in the Fox Memorial grand final.

Ron Ackland again won the Rothville Trophy as player of the year.

Roger Bailey played for Ponsonby.

=== Wellington ===
Korodale won the Wellington Rugby League's Appleton Shield.

=== Canterbury ===
Linwood won the Canterbury Rugby League's Massetti Cup.

=== Other Competitions ===
Jock Butterfield was the captain-coach of Brunner in the West Coast Rugby League competition. Greymouth Marist defeated Linwood 10–5 to win the Thacker Shield.
