= 1964 New Zealand rugby league season =

Seasons
- ← 1963 1965 →

The 1964 New Zealand rugby league season was the 57th season of rugby league that had been played in New Zealand.

== International competitions ==
New Zealand defeated France 3–0 in a Test series. New Zealand included Roger Bailey, Gary Blackler, Jim Bond, John Bray, Reg Cooke, captain Mel Cooke, Ian Drayton, Sam Edwards, Maunga Emery, Jack Fagan, Don Hammond, Graham Kennedy, Graham Mattson, Ken McCracken, Ray Sinel, Bill Snowden, George H Turner, Pat White and Ernie Wiggs.

France defeated Auckland 13–10 between the second and third Test matches. Auckland included Chris Smith, Roy Christian, Brian Campbell, Roger Bailey, Phillip Rowe, Cyril Eastlake, Eric Carson, Sam Edwards, Bill Schultz, Graham Mattson, Ernie Wiggs, Don Mann and captain Ron Ackland.

Don Hammond won the New Zealand Rugby League's player of the year award.

== National competitions ==
=== Northern Union Cup ===
Auckland held the Northern Union Cup at the end of the season, after they had defeated Canterbury 13–7 at the Addington Showgrounds on Queen's Birthday weekend.

=== Inter-island competition ===
The South Island defeated the North Island 14–11 at the Show Grounds.

The South Island included Brian Langton, Pat White, Jim Bond, Bob Irvine, Gary Blackler, Jim Fisher and Mel Cooke.

=== Inter-district competition ===
Auckland defeated the West Coast 44–2 at Carlaw Park and 31–2 in Greymouth. They also defeated a "Rest of North Island" team 29–7 at Carlaw Park.

Don Hammond, Reg Cooke, Doug Ellwood, Ken McCracken, Roger Bailey, Gary Bailey, John Lasher and Jack Fagan played for Auckland.

Canterbury included Pat White, Brian Langton, Jim Bond, Bob Irvine, Gary Blackler, Jim Fisher and Ian Drayton.

=== National Club competition ===
Otahuhu (Auckland) won the Rothmans tournament, defeating Hornby (Canterbury) 10–5 in the final. Otahuhu had previously beaten Ngongotaha (Bay of Plenty) 43–5 and Huntly South (Waikato) 15–10.

== Club competitions ==
=== Auckland ===
Otahuhu won the Auckland Rugby League's Fox Memorial Trophy and the Rukutai Shield. The Mount Albert Lions won the Roope Rooster and Stormont Shield, defeating Otahuhu 15–7 and 19–3 respectively.

Don Hammond won the Rothville Trophy for Eastern.

This was the first year of stand alone clubs, following the abandonment of the Auckland Rugby League's "district scheme". To "unwind" from the scheme, Glenora, Marist, Midlands District, Otahuhu, City-Newton, Eastern Suburbs, Ellerslie, Mount Albert, Northcote, North Shore, Point Chevalier, Ponsonby, Richmond and Southern Districts all played in the fourteen team first division. The top eight qualified for the 1965 competition.

The Mangere East Hawks and the Albany/Glenfield were founded in 1964 while Howick played in the senior competition for the first time under coach Tommy Baxter.

Ernie Wiggs and Joe Gwynne played for Otahuhu, where Wiggs scored 218 points, Reg Cooke scored 205 points for City-Newton and Roger Tait scored 203 points for Glenora.

=== Wellington ===
Miramar won the Wellington Rugby League's Appleton Shield.

=== Canterbury ===
Hornby won the Canterbury Rugby League's Massetti Cup and that Thacker Shield, defeating Greymouth Marist 18–16. Mel Cooke was Hornby's captain-coach.

Hornby included John Bray, Mel Cooke, Ian Drayton and Brian Langton.
