= 1960 New Zealand rugby league season =

Seasons
- ← 1959 1961 →

The 1960 New Zealand rugby league season was the 53rd season of rugby league that had been played in New Zealand.

== International competitions ==
New Zealand defeated France 2–0 at home before leaving to participate in the World Cup in Great Britain. The squad for the French series was Ron Ackland, Jock Butterfield, Mel Cooke, Neville Denton, Cyril Eastlake, Reese Griffiths, Tom Hadfield, captain Cliff Johnson, Trevor Kilkelly, Henry Maxwell, George Menzies, Keith Roberts and George P Turner.

At the World Cup, the Kiwis lost to Great Britain and Australia but defeated France to finish third. The team was coached by Travers Hardwick, managed by Tom Skinner and included; Ron Ackland, Jock Butterfield, Reg Cooke, Mel Cooke, Neville Denton, Cyril Eastlake, Reece Griffiths, Tom Hadfield, captain Cliff Johnson, Trevor Kilkelly, Henry Maxwell, George Menzies, Laurie Olliff, Gary Phillips, Tom Reid, Keith Roberts, William Sorensen and George Turner.

Auckland defeated France 14–5 at Carlaw Park while Canterbury lost to the French 15–8. The Auckland team was; Jack Fagan, Neville Denton, George Turner, Cyril Eastlake, Murray Paterson, Bill Sorensen, Bill Snowden, Henry Maxwell, Jim Patterson, Nelson Johnson, Ron Ackland, Jim Riddell and Ron McKay. France also defeated Waikato 32–2, Taranaki 30–21, Wellington 41–3, the West Coast 29–5 and New Zealand Māori 23–12.

== National competitions ==
=== Northern Union Cup ===
Auckland again held the Northern Union Cup at the end of the season. However, during the season they had lost the trophy to the West Coast 22–18 at Carlaw Park before Auckland regained it, and the Meates Cup, 19–4 in Greymouth. Auckland then defeated Canterbury 8–2.

=== Inter-district competition ===
While Auckland was touring the South Island, Auckland B defeated Waikato 11–8.

Auckland included Tom Hadfield, Neville Denton, Murray Paterson, Bill Sorensen, George Turner, Ron Ackland, Jim Patterson and Cyril Eastlake. Canterbury included captain Keith Roberts, Allen Amer, Mita Mohi, Mel Cooke, Kevin Pearce, Jim Bond, Jim Fisher and Tony Smith. The West Coast were advised by Snow Telford and included Graham Kennedy, Trevor Kilkelly and Reese Griffiths.

== Club competitions ==
=== Auckland ===
Eastern United & Southern Districts shared the Auckland Rugby League's Fox Memorial Trophy after drawing 7-all in the grand final. Eastern United also won the Rukutai Shield while Glenora won the Roope Rooster. Eastern and Glenora shared the Stormont Shield. Ron Ackland won the Rothville Trophy for Eastern as player of the year.

Under the Auckland Rugby League's "district scheme", which lasted until 1963, Ponsonby and Richmond combined to form "Central Districts", after Ponsonby had been relegated in 1959 for refusing to amalgamate. Ellerslie joined Eastern Districts and the side was re-titled "Eastern United". Mount Roskill and Manukau-Greenlane formed "Midland Districts".

Manurewa were founded in 1960.

=== Wellington ===
Korodale won the Wellington Rugby League's Appleton Shield.

=== Canterbury ===
Linwood and Papanui shared the Canterbury Rugby League's Massetti Cup.

The Halswell club was formed.

=== Other Competitions ===
Jock Butterfield was the captain-coach of Brunner in the West Coast Rugby League competition. Greymouth Marist defeated Linwood 13–7 to win the Thacker Shield.
