= 1965 New Zealand rugby league season =

Seasons
- 1964 1966

The 1965 New Zealand rugby league season was the 58th season of rugby league that had been played in New Zealand.

== International competitions ==
New Zealand drew a Test series 1-all with Australia. Australia defeated Wellington 34–16, Canterbury 19–4, the West Coast 16–6, Taranaki 29–11, Waikato 25-4 and Auckland at Carlaw Park 18–2. The Auckland team was; Jack Fagan, Roy Christian, Gary Bailey, Reg Cooke, Brian Campbell, Doug Ellwood, Billy Harford, Roy Roberts, Len Morgan, Albie Wiggs, Eddie Moore, Graham Mattson and Ernie Wiggs. Tony Kriletich came on as a substitute for Eddie Moore at halftime after Moore suffered a broken nose.

The Kiwis then toured Great Britain and France, losing the series to Great Britain 0–2, with one draw, and losing the series against France 0–3. The team was coached by Bill Telford.

New South Wales Country toured New Zealand, beating Canterbury 32–10 before losing to Auckland 18–5.

Bill Deacon won the New Zealand Rugby League's player of the year award.

== National competitions ==
=== Northern Union Cup ===
Auckland again held the Northern Union Cup at the end of the season. Auckland defeated Canterbury 23–0 in a challenge match at Auckland and won again 8–6 in a match at the Addington Showgrounds.

=== Inter-island competition ===
The North Island defeated South Island 16–2 in Greymouth in what was to be the last inter-island fixture.

=== Inter-district competition ===
Auckland won the Rothmans trophy, defeating Wellington 11–4 in the final.

The West Coast defeated Canterbury 6–2 on 2 June in a match to celebrate 50 years of the West Coast Rugby League.

- Ernie Wiggs, Brian Reidy, Bill Snowden, Jack Fagan and Tony Kriletich played for Auckland.
- Bill Deacon played for Waikato, who were previously called South Auckland.
- Ian Drayton, Bob Irvine, Mita Mohi, Jim White, Jim Fisher and Bill Noonan played for Canterbury.

== Club competitions ==
=== Auckland ===
Marist Brothers won the Auckland Rugby League's Fox Memorial Trophy, defeating Glenora 19–6. They also shared the Stormont Shield with Otahuhu after a 15-all draw. Otahuhu won the Roope Rooster while Ponsonby won the Rukutai Shield. Southern won the Sharman Cup.

Tony Kriletich won the Lipscombe Cup while Bill Harford won the Rothville Trophy, both were from Marist.

City-Newton, Ellerslie, Glenora, Marist, Midlands, Mount Albert, Otahuhu and Ponsonby all competed in the first division, after qualifying from the expanded 1964 competition.

Marist were coached by Neville Denton and included Kriletich, captain Harford, Brian Reidy, Oscar Danielson and Bill and Paul Schultz.

=== Wellington ===
Marist won the Wellington Rugby League's Appleton Shield.

=== Canterbury ===
Hornby, in its 50th year, won the Canterbury Rugby League's Massetti Cup.

=== Other Competitions ===
Greymouth Marist defeated Hornby 9–8 to win the Thacker Shield.
