= 1961 Kangaroo tour of New Zealand =

1961 rugby league tour

- Manager: Jack Kessey; G.W. (Jock) Allen
- Coach(es): Brian Carlson
- Tour captain(s): Brian Carlson; Barry Muir
- Top point scorer(s): Don Parish 58
- Top try scorer(s): Ken Irvine 10
- Top test point scorer(s): Don Parish 11
- Top test try scorer(s): 6 tries by 6 players (4 Aus, 2 NZ)
Summary
| P | W | D | L |
Total
| 9 | 7 | 0 | 2 |
Test match
| 2 | 1 | 0 | 1 |
Opponent
| P | W | D | L |
New Zealand
| 2 | 1 | 0 | 1 |

Tour chronology
- Previous tour: 1953 by to 1959 by to 1959-60 to 1960 by
- Next tour: 1962 by 1963 by to 1963-64 to 1965 by to

The 1961 Kangaroo Tour of New Zealand was a mid-season tour of New Zealand by the Australia national rugby league team. The Australians played nine matches on tour, including two tests against the New Zealand national rugby league team. The tour began on 17 June and finished on 10 July.

== Leadership ==
Brian Carlson was both the captain and the coach of the touring side. Carlson did not play in the Second Test and tour vice-captain Barry Muir led Australia in that match.
In the two matches in which neither Carlson nor Muir played, the Kangaroos were captained by Reg Gasnier (against Taranaki) and Ian Walsh (against Auckland).
The team was managed by Jack Kessey of Newtown, New South Wales and G.W. (Jock) Allen of Toowooomba, Queensland.

== Touring squad ==
The Rugby League News published

- details of the touring team including the players' ages and weights; and
- a summary of match results and players' appearances and points scoring.

Match details - listing surnames of both teams and the point scorers - were included in E.E. Christensen's Official Rugby League Yearbook, as was a summary of the players' point-scoring.
Beattie, Day, Gehrke, Gil, Muir, Paterson and Rasmussen were selected from Queensland clubs. Beaven, Crowe and Owen were selected from clubs in New South Wales Country areas. The balance of the squad had played for Sydney based clubs during the 1961 season.

| Player | Position | Age | Weight st.lb (kg) | Club | Tests on Tour | Games | Tries | Goals | FG | Points |
|---|---|---|---|---|---|---|---|---|---|---|
| Dud Beattie | Prop | 25 | 14.12 (94) | Ipswich Railways | 1 | 7 | 0 | 0 | 0 | 0 |
| Ray Beavan | Five-eighth | 24 | 11.2 (71) | Tumut | 0 | 4 | 0 | 0 | 0 | 0 |
| Brian Carlson | Utility Back | 28 | 14.4 (91) | St George | 1 | 3 | 0 | 3 | 0 | 6 |
| Ron Crowe | Prop | 27 | 14.12 (94) | West Wyalong | 2 | 7 | 1 | 1 | 0 | 5 |
| Ken Day | Lock | 25 | 15.0 (95) | Brisbane Western Suburbs | 0 | 1 | 0 | 0 | 0 | 0 |
| Frank Drake | Fullback | 22 | 11.6 (73) | Western Suburbs | 1 | 7 | 9 | 0 | 0 | 27 |
| Reg Gasnier | Centre | 22 | 12.8 (80) | St George | 2 | 6 | 6 | 0 | 0 | 18 |
| Bob Gehrke | Hooker | 23 | 11.7 (73) | Brisbane Valleys | 0 | 5 | 2 | 0 | 0 | 6 |
| Alan Gil | Centre | 22 | 12.4 (78) | Toowoomba All Whites | 0 | 6 | 1 | 0 | 0 | 3 |
| Ken Irvine | Wing | 21 | 12.4 (78) | North Sydney | 2 | 8 | 10 | 1 | 0 | 32 |
| Eddie Lumsden | Wing | 24 | 13.9 (87) | St George | 2 | 8 | 6 | 0 | 0 | 18 |
| Ron Lynch | Second-row | 21 | 13.10 (87) | Parramatta | 2 | 6 | 0 | 0 | 0 | 0 |
| Barry Muir | Halfback | 23 | 10.11 (68) | Brisbane Western Suburbs | 2 | 7 | 4 | 2 | 0 | 16 |
| Bill Owen | Second-row | 25 | 13.7 (86) | Newcastle Northern Suburbs | 0 | 6 | 1 | 0 | 0 | 3 |
| Don Parish | Utility Back | 23 | 12.0 (76) | Western Suburbs | 2 | 7 | 4 | 23 | 0 | 58 |
| Jim Paterson | Second-row | 25 | 14.10 (93) | Innisfail | 2 | 6 | 2 | 0 | 0 | 6 |
| Elton Rasmussen | Prop, Second-row | 23 | 15.4 (97) | Toowoomba All Whites | 2 | 7 | 0 | 1 | 0 | 2 |
| Jack Sinclair | Lock | 24 | 13.4 (84) | Manly-Warringah | 1 | 5 | 3 | 0 | 0 | 9 |
| Arthur Summons | Halfback | 25 | 11.0 (70) | Western Suburbs | 2 | 6 | 1 | 0 | 0 | 3 |
| Ian Walsh | Hooker | 27 | 13.6 (85) | St George | 2 | 5 | 1 | 0 | 0 | 3 |

== Tour ==
The Australians played nine matches on the tour, winning seven matches and losing the last two.

Saturday 17 June

| New Zealand Māori | 13 – 25 | Australia |

Rotorua International Stadium, Rotorua
Attendance: 1,787

Wednesday 21 June

| Wellington | 3 – 66 | Australia |

Basin Reserve, Wellington
Attendance: 707

Friday 23 June

| National Coaching School | 4 – 9 | Australia |

Rugby League Park, Christchurch
Attendance: 2,793

Saturday 24 June

| West Coast | 7 – 27 | Australia |

Wingham Park, Greymouth
Attendance: 1,682

Tuesday 27 June

| Taranaki | 0 – 34 | Australia |

Burnside Showgrounds, Hāwera
Attendance: 600

=== First test ===
Saturday 1 July

| New Zealand | 12 – 10 | Australia |
|---|---|---|
| Tries: Maunga Emery; Graeme Farrar; Goals: Reg Cooke (2/2); Field Goals; Gary Phillips | | Tries: Ken Irvine; Don Parish; Goals: Don Parish (2/2) |

Carlaw Park, Auckland
Attendance: 11,485
Referee: Roland Avery (New Zealand)

New Zealand

| FB | 1 | Gary Phillips |
| RW | 2 | Brian Reidy |
| RC | 3 | George H. Turner |
| LC | 4 | Tom Hadfield |
| LW | 5 | Reg Cooke |
| FE | 6 | George Menzies |
| HB | 7 | Graeme Farrar |
| PR | 8 | Jim Patterson |
| HK | 9 | Jock Butterfield |
| PR | 10 | Maunga Emery |
| SR | 11 | Don Hammond |
| SR | 12 | Ron Ackland (c) |
| LF | 13 | Mel Cooke |
Coach:
| (New Zealand) Des White |

Australia

| FB | 1 | Don Parish |
| RW | 2 | Ken Irvine |
| RC | 3 | Reg Gasnier |
| LC | 4 | Brian Carlson (c) |
| LW | 5 | Eddie Lumsden |
| FE | 6 | Arthur Summons |
| HB | 7 | Barry Muir |
| PR | 8 | Elton Rasmussen |
| HK | 9 | Ian Walsh |
| PR | 10 | Ron Crowe |
| SR | 11 | Jim Paterson |
| SR | 12 | Ron Lynch |
| LF | 13 | Jack Sinclair |
Coach:
(Australia) Brian Carlson

Wednesday 5 July

| Waikato | 8 – 26 | Australia |

Steele Park, Hamilton
Attendance: 886

=== Second test ===
Saturday 8 July

| New Zealand | 8 – 10 | Australia |
|---|---|---|
| Tries: Goals: Reg Cooke (3/3); Gary Phillips (1/1) | | Tries: Reg Gasnier (2); Arthur Summons; Goals: Don Parish (2/2) |

Carlaw Park, Auckland
Attendance: 12,424
Referee: Roland Avery (New Zealand)

New Zealand

| FB | 1 | Gary Phillips |
| RW | 2 | Brian Reidy |
| RC | 3 | George H. Turner |
| LC | 4 | Tom Hadfield |
| LW | 5 | Reg Cooke |
| FE | 6 | George Menzies |
| HB | 7 | Bill Snowden |
| PR | 8 | Jim Patterson |
| HK | 9 | Tom Reid |
| PR | 10 | Maunga Emery |
| SR | 11 | Don Hammond |
| SR | 12 | Ron Ackland (c) |
| LF | 13 | Mel Cooke |
Coach:
| (New Zealand) Des White |

Australia

| FB | 1 | Frank Drake |
| RW | 2 | Ken Irvine |
| RC | 3 | Don Parish |
| LC | 4 | Reg Gasnier |
| LW | 5 | Eddie Lumsden |
| FE | 6 | Arthur Summons |
| HB | 7 | Barry Muir (c) |
| PR | 8 | Ron Crowe |
| HK | 9 | Ian Walsh |
| PR | 10 | Dud Beattie |
| SR | 11 | Elton Rasmussen |
| SR | 12 | Jim Paterson |
| LF | 13 | Ron Lynch |
Coach:
(Australia) Brian Carlson

Monday 10 July

| Auckland | 13 – 8 | Australia |

Carlaw Park, Auckland
Attendance: 5,148
