= 1966 New Zealand rugby league season =

Seasons
- ← 1965 1967 →

The 1966 New Zealand rugby league season was the 59th season of rugby league that had been played in New Zealand.

== International competitions ==
New Zealand lost two Test matches to Great Britain. Canterbury lost to Great Britain 6-53. Auckland then lost 12–11 in the last minute to Great Britain in the final match of the tour, meaning Great Britain had completed the eight match tour undefeated. The Auckland team was selected by Des Barchard, Bruce Robertson and Gary Phillips and included Roger Tait, Brian Reidy, Gary Bailey, Lester Mills, Roy Christian, Doug Ellwood, Paul Schultz, Roy Roberts, Bill Schultz, Oscar Danielson, Eddie Moore, Victor Yates and captain Bruce Castle.

New South Wales Country toured New Zealand, defeating Northland 13-0 and Canterbury 21-12 before losing to Auckland 23–2.

Roy Christian won the New Zealand Rugby League's player of the year award.

== National competitions ==
=== Northern Union Cup ===
Auckland again held the Northern Union Cup at the end of the season.

=== Inter-district competition ===
Auckland won the Rothmans trophy, defeating Wellington 37–21 in the final.

- Roy Christian, Len Morgan, Victor Yates, Paul Schultz, Bob Mincham, Roger Bailey, Roger Tait, Ernie Wiggs and Lester Mills played for Auckland.
- Canterbury included Ian Drayton, Mita Mohi, captain Jim Fisher and Gary Clarke.

== Club competitions ==
=== Auckland ===
Marist won the Auckland Rugby League's Fox Memorial Trophy, Roope Rooster and Stormont Shield. They defeated Ponsonby 24–7 in the final. Otahuhu won the Rukutai Shield. City Newton won the Sharman Cup.

Roy Christian from Otahuhu won the Lipscombe Cup while Bruce Castle from Ellerslie won the Rothville Trophy.

Marist were coached by Neville Denton and included Tony Kriletich, captain Brian Reidy, Oscar Danielson and Bill and Paul Schultz. Ponsonby included Jack Fagan, Bill Snowden and Gary Bailey, who all left at the end of the year.

=== Wellington ===
Mirimar and Waterside shared the Wellington Rugby League's Appleton Shield.

=== Canterbury ===
Hornby won the Canterbury Rugby League's Massetti Cup.

Mike Morgan (Linwood) won the A.G.Bailey Challenge Cup as the leading tryscorer.

=== Other Competitions ===
Greymouth Marist defeated Hornby 23–4 to win the Thacker Shield.
