= 1959 New Zealand rugby league season =

Seasons
- ← 1958 1960 →

The 1959 New Zealand rugby league season was the 52nd season of rugby league that had been played in New Zealand.

== International competitions ==
New Zealand toured Australia, losing the series 1–2. The team was coached by Travers Hardwick and included; Gary Phillips, Reese Griffiths, Cyril Eastlake, George P Turner, Neville Denton, George Menzies, Keith Roberts, Henry Maxwell, Jock Butterfield, captain Cliff Johnson, Trevor Kilkelly, Ron Ackland, Rex Percy, Brian Campbell, Joe Ratima and Mel Cooke.

The Auckland Rugby League's champion Western Districts defeated the New South Wales Rugby League's St. George Dragons 8–7 at Carlaw Park in September. The Dragons had previously been undefeated during the season. The Dragons defeated the Ellerslie Eagles 11–10.

== National competitions ==
=== Northern Union Cup ===
Auckland again held the Northern Union Cup at the end of the season.

== Club competitions ==
=== Auckland ===
Western United won the Auckland Rugby League's Fox Memorial Trophy and Rukutai Shield. Western United defeated Richmond 15–0 in the Fox Memorial final. Ellerslie won the Roope Rooster and Stormont Shield.

Auckland hosted a week-long club tournament to celebrate its 50th anniversary. Western United won the title, defeating Papanui (Canterbury) 39–14. Other competitors were Wellington Marist and Huntly South (Waikato). One week later Western United defeated the St. George Dragons 8–7.

Under the Auckland Rugby League's "district scheme", which lasted until 1963, Otahuhu, Papakura and Papatoetoe combined to form "Southern Districts" and Mount Albert and Point Chevalier formed "Western Districts". Ponsonby refused to amalgamate with Richmond and instead was relegated into the second division.

Tommy Baxter was the Western United's player-coach and the side also included vice-captain Henry Maxwell, Laurie Olliff and Don Hammond.

=== Wellington ===
Marist won the Wellington Rugby League's Appleton Shield.

=== Canterbury ===
Papanui won the Canterbury Rugby League's Massetti Cup.

Marist included Pat and Jim White.

=== Other Competitions ===
Jock Butterfield was the captain-coach of Brunner in the West Coast Rugby League competition. Greymouth Marist defeated Papanui 31–13 to win the Thacker Shield.
