= Billy Harrison (rugby league) =

NZ international rugby league footballer (1938–2021)

Personal information
- Born: William Rapihana Harrison; 9 June 1938
- Died: 30 December 2021 (aged 83)

Playing information
- Position: Fullback
Club
Years	Team	Pld	T	G	FG	P
	Korodale (WRL)
Representative
Years	Team	Pld	T	G	FG	P
≤1961–≥61	Wellington
	New Zealand Māori
1961	New Zealand	2	0	0	0	0
1963	North Island
- Relatives: Rata Harrison (brother)

William Rapihana Harrison (9 June 1938 – 30 December 2021) was a New Zealand rugby league footballer who played in the 1960s. He played at representative level for New Zealand, and Wellington, as a fullback.

== Playing career ==
Harrison played for the Korodale club in the Wellington Rugby League competition, winning premierships in 1960 and 1961 and sharing another in 1963.

=== Representative career ===
Harrison was a Wellington and New Zealand Māori representative before he was selected for the New Zealand national rugby league team. He toured on the 1961 tour of Great Britain and France and represented New Zealand in 1961 against Great Britain and France. Due to injury he played in only 10 games on tour, a broken jaw restricted his appearances. Despite this, he replaced the legendary Jack Fagan in the third test against Great Britain and the first test against France. Harrison proved himself to be one of the finds of the tour.

Injury prevented him playing for the Kiwis in 1963 but he was selected for the North Island side against the South Island.

== Personal life and death ==
Harrison was the brother of fellow former international Rata Harrison, and brother-in-law of former Kiwis manager, Manu Diamond. Billy Harrison died on 30 December 2021, at the age of 83, and was buried at Akatarawa Cemetery, Upper Hutt.
