= Horrie Kessey =

Australian rugby league footballer

Personal information
- Full name: Horace Merlyn Kessey
- Born: 9 September 1927 Marrickville, New South Wales, Australia
- Died: 12 January 2015 (aged 87) Forster, New South Wales, Australia

Playing information
- Position: Wing
Club
Years	Team	Pld	T	G	FG	P
1946–53	Newtown	76	46	0	0	138

Horrie Kessey (1927-2015) was an Australian rugby league footballer who played in the 1940s and 1950s, spending his entire career with Newtown in the NSWRL competition as a wing. He was the son of former Newtown captain Jack Kessey who played for the club in the 1920s and 1930s.

== Playing career ==
Kessey made his first grade debut for Newtown in 1946 and played in the club's finals defeat against Canterbury in the same year. In 1947, Kessey scored 7 tries for the club as they qualified for the finals again losing to the same opponents as the year before.

In 1948, Kessey played on the wing in Newtown's reserve grade premiership winning side. In 1949, Kessey finished as the club's top try scorer with 14 tries to his name and in 1950 scored 10 tries as the club finished 3rd on the table before being eliminated in the finals series by South Sydney.

Kessey went on to finish his first grade career with Newtown in 1953 after scoring 46 tries in 76 games. Kessey was later made a life member of the club. He died on 12 January 2015.
