= Jarrod McCracken =

NZ international rugby league footballer

Personal information
- Born: 27 March 1970 (age 56) Auckland, New Zealand

Playing information
- Height: 191 cm (6 ft 3 in)
- Weight: 104 kg (16 st 5 lb)
- Position: Centre, Second-row
Club
Years	Team	Pld	T	G	FG	P
1988–90	Glenora Bears
1991–95	Canterbury Bulldogs	80	24	0	0	96
1992–93	St Helens	21	5	0	0	20
1996–99	Parramatta Eels	76	16	0	0	64
2000	Wests Tigers	8	1	0	0	4
	Total	185	46	0	0	184
Representative
Years	Team	Pld	T	G	FG	P
1991–99	New Zealand	22	5	0	0	20
1997	Rest of the World	1	1	0	0	4
- Father: Ken McCracken

Jarrod McCracken (born 27 March 1970) is a New Zealand former rugby league footballer who played in the 1990s and 2000s. He is a former captain of the New Zealand national rugby league team and is the son of New Zealand rugby league international, Ken McCracken. McCracken played club football in Australia, captaining both the Parramatta Eels and Wests Tigers during his career which ended with a spear tackle which he successfully sued for. During his time in the game, McCracken was regarded as one of the hardest running and most damaging centres in the world.

== Early years ==
McCracken played for the Glenora Bears and first went to Australia in 1989 when he was sent to the North Sydney Bears as part of the New Zealand Rugby League Rookie Scheme. He spent the 1989 NSWRL season playing in the lower grades for Norths before moving to Port Macquarie on the NSW mid-north coast in 1990 where he represented North Coast against the touring French side that year.

== Professional career ==
McCracken was playing his football in Port Macquarie when he was spotted by Canterbury-Bankstown Bulldogs Chief Executive Peter Moore who persuaded the young Centre to join The Bulldogs in 1991, and he ended up staying with the club until 1995, although he also spent the 1992/93 English season with St. Helens. During the Super League war he joined the Parramatta Eels being appointed co-captain, before moving to the Wests Tigers in 2000 where he became the franchise's first captain.

Jarrod McCracken played at centre in St. Helens' 4–5 defeat by Wigan in the 1992 Lancashire Cup Final during the 1992–93 season at Knowsley Road, St. Helens, on Sunday 18 October 1992.

McCracken played in Canterbury's 1994 Grand Final loss to the Canberra Raiders. McCracken's luck with Grand Finals was against him again in 1995. As a result of the Super League war and his mid-season announcement that he would be leaving the Bulldogs at the end of the year to join the ARL loyal club Parramatta, McCracken missed out on the Dogs historic 1995 Grand Final win over Manly-Warringah when they became the first team to win the premiership from outside the top four (they finished the regular season in 6th with a 14–8 record compared to Manly finishing 1st with a 20–2 record which included a 26–0 mauling of the renamed Sydney Bulldogs in Round 9 at Parramatta Stadium). As a result of his impending departure from the club, Bulldogs coach Chris Anderson dropped McCracken to reserve grade despite him playing in the top grade for the first 19 games of the season and having represented New Zealand in tests against both France and Australia. Because of this, McCracken preferred to sit out the Bulldogs finals campaign rather than try to fight his way back into the team, unlike his team mates Dean Pay, Jim Dymock and Jason Smith who were also dropped by Anderson for the same reason.

McCracken made his debut for Parramatta in 1996 against South Queensland scoring a try in a 24–20 loss. In 1997, McCracken played 21 games as Parramatta finished 3rd and qualified for the finals for the first time since 1986. Parramatta then went on to lose both finals matches against Newcastle and North Sydney in which they led both games at half time before capitulating in the second half.

In 1998, McCracken co-captained Parramatta and change positions moving into the forwards. Parramatta finished 4th at the end of the season and qualified for the finals. McCracken played in all 3 finals games for the club including the preliminary final loss to his former team Canterbury.

With Parramatta leading 18–2 with less than 10 minutes to play, Canterbury staged a comeback scoring 3 tries in 8 minutes with Canterbury player Daryl Halligan kicking 2 goals from the sideline to tie the game at 18–18. Parramatta player Paul Carige then made a series of personal errors which cost Parramatta dearly in extra time with Canterbury going on to win 32–20. The game is often referred to as one of the biggest preliminary final chokes of all time.

In 1999, McCracken played nearly every game for Parramatta as they finished 2nd on the table at the end of the regular season. Parramatta reached the preliminary final against Melbourne where they led 16–0 at half time before a second half capitulation ended with the club losing 18–16. The match was also McCracken's last for Parramatta.

== Representative career ==
It was during his first season at Canterbury in the NSWRL premiership that McCracken emulated his father and represented New Zealand. He starred in the 1991 Trans-Tasman Test series against Australia, scoring a try in the first test triumph in Melbourne, but was unfortunately sent-off in the second test in Sydney after a fight with Australia's Peter Jackson (who was also marched), and he scored again in the third and deciding test in Brisbane. Despite McCracken's good form during the series, the Kiwi's only won the 1st test 24–8 at Olympic Park but were outclassed at the Sydney Football Stadium 44–0 and again at Lang Park 40–12.

McCracken represented New Zealand 22 times between 1991 and 1999, including helping The Kiwis to reach the Semi-finals of the 1995 Rugby League World Cup in England where again the Aussies were the nemesis, winning 30–20 in extra time after a spirited fightback by the Black and Whites had levelled the scores at 20-all close to the original full-time. He also played a one-off international for a 'Rest of the World' team in their 28–8 loss against the Australian Rugby League's Kangaroos in mid-1997.

== Retirement ==
McCracken's football career came to a premature end in round 15 of the 2000 NRL competition in a game against the Melbourne Storm, when Storm players Stephen Kearney (a long time Kiwis team mate and in later years test second-row partner) and Marcus Bai performed a dangerous spear tackle on him, inflicting a career-ending neck injury. McCracken later successfully sued the Melbourne Storm and the two players involved for general damages, totalling $90,000 plus interest.

== Post league career ==
He has since become a real estate developer in Australia, where his company conducted a major redevelopment of Townsville's CBD. In 2010 McCracken was fined $182,500 for clearing bushland on a property he owned near Airlie Beach in 2007. McCracken pleaded guilty to nine charges related to clearing and carrying out unauthorised earthworks on more than 18 ha of sensitive bushland at his wife's 387 ha property, as well as felling trees in a strip of state-owned land adjoining his property. These 2007 earthworks also destroyed indigenous shell middens and heritage sites, with an estimated 8516 tonnes of soil sediment leaving the site and entering the ocean. Rehabilitation of the affected sites was undertaken as a result of this action by the Queensland Environmental Protection Agency and the Whitsunday Shire Council.

On 28 March 2018, McCracken was sentenced to a two year good behaviour bond upon entering into a $5,000 recognizance. McCracken pleaded guilty to leaving Australia without the consent of his trustee. McCracken was made bankrupt on 18 December 2013 by debtors petition. On 19 December 2013, McCracken was sent a letter stating that he is not to leave Australia without the consent of his trustee. In 2015, it was found that McCracken had travelled to Bali without consent. In sentencing, Magistrate Hall said that McCracken had flouted the provisions of the Bankruptcy Act and that it was important to have a level of deterrence.

McCracken currently lives in Airlie Beach, Queensland.
