= Jack Kessey =

Australian rugby league footballer and administrator

Personal information
- Full name: John Horace Press Kessey
- Born: 17 March 1902 Rockley, New South Wales, Australia
- Died: 27 January 1974 (aged 71) Lewisham, New South Wales, Australia

Playing information
Club
Years	Team	Pld	T	G	FG	P
1926–32	Newtown	70	26	0	0	78

Jack Kessey (1902–1974) was an Australian rugby league footballer who played in the 1920s and 1930s. He played for the Newtown in the NSWRL premiership. His position was as a winger.

== Playing career ==
A Newtown junior, Kessey made his debut for the club in Round 15 of the 1926 season against St George. In 1928, Kessey was a member of the Newtown side which finished last on the table with only one win for the entire season. In 1929, Newtown's fortunes changed and the club went from wooden spooners to grand finalists as they faced South Sydney in the 1929 decider. Kessey captained the team as they were soundly beaten by Souths 30–10 at the Sydney Sports Ground.

Kessey played a further three seasons for Newtown and retired at the end of 1932, a year before the club was to claim their second premiership in 1933. Kessey later became treasurer at the club and Kessey's son Horrie Kessey later played for Newtown on 76 occasions between 1946 and 1953.

Kessey co-managed the 1961 Australian tour of New Zealand.
