= Raelene Castle =

Australian sports executive (born 1970)

Raelene Castle ONZM
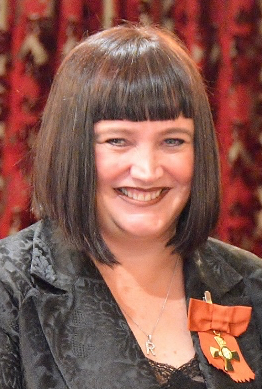
- Castle in 2015
- Born: 30 September 1970 (age 56); Wagga Wagga, New South Wales, Australia
- Occupation: Sports executive
- Years active: 2001−present
- Parent(s): Bruce Castle (father); Marlene Castle (mother)

Raelene Castle ONZM (born 30 September 1970) is a sports executive who has worked in Australia and New Zealand. She was chief executive officer of Rugby Australia from 2017 to 2020, before becoming chief executive officer of Sport New Zealand.

== Early life and family ==
Castle was born in Wagga Wagga, New South Wales, Australia, on 30 September 1970, the daughter of Bruce and Marlene Castle. Both of her parents represented New Zealand internationally in sports: her father as a rugby league footballer and her mother as a lawn bowler. The family returned to New Zealand when Castle was six months old.

== Career ==
From 2007 to 2013, Castle was the chief executive officer (CEO) of Netball New Zealand. In 2013, she was appointed CEO of Canterbury-Bankstown Bulldogs, becoming the first female CEO of a club in the National Rugby League. At the end of the 2017 season, she was replaced by Rugby League World Cup boss Andrew Hill.

In December 2017, Castle was appointed as CEO of Rugby Australia, and served in that role until her resignation in April 2020. In December 2020, Castle took up a role as CEO of Sport New Zealand following contract work on Sport New Zealand's Strengthen and Adapt project.

== Honours ==
In the 2015 New Year Honours, Castle was appointed an Officer of the New Zealand Order of Merit, for services to sport and business.

Preceded by Bill Pulver	Australian Rugby Union CEO; 2017–2020	Succeeded by Rob Clarke (interim)
