= John Ackland (rugby league) =

NZ international rugby league player, coach & cricketer

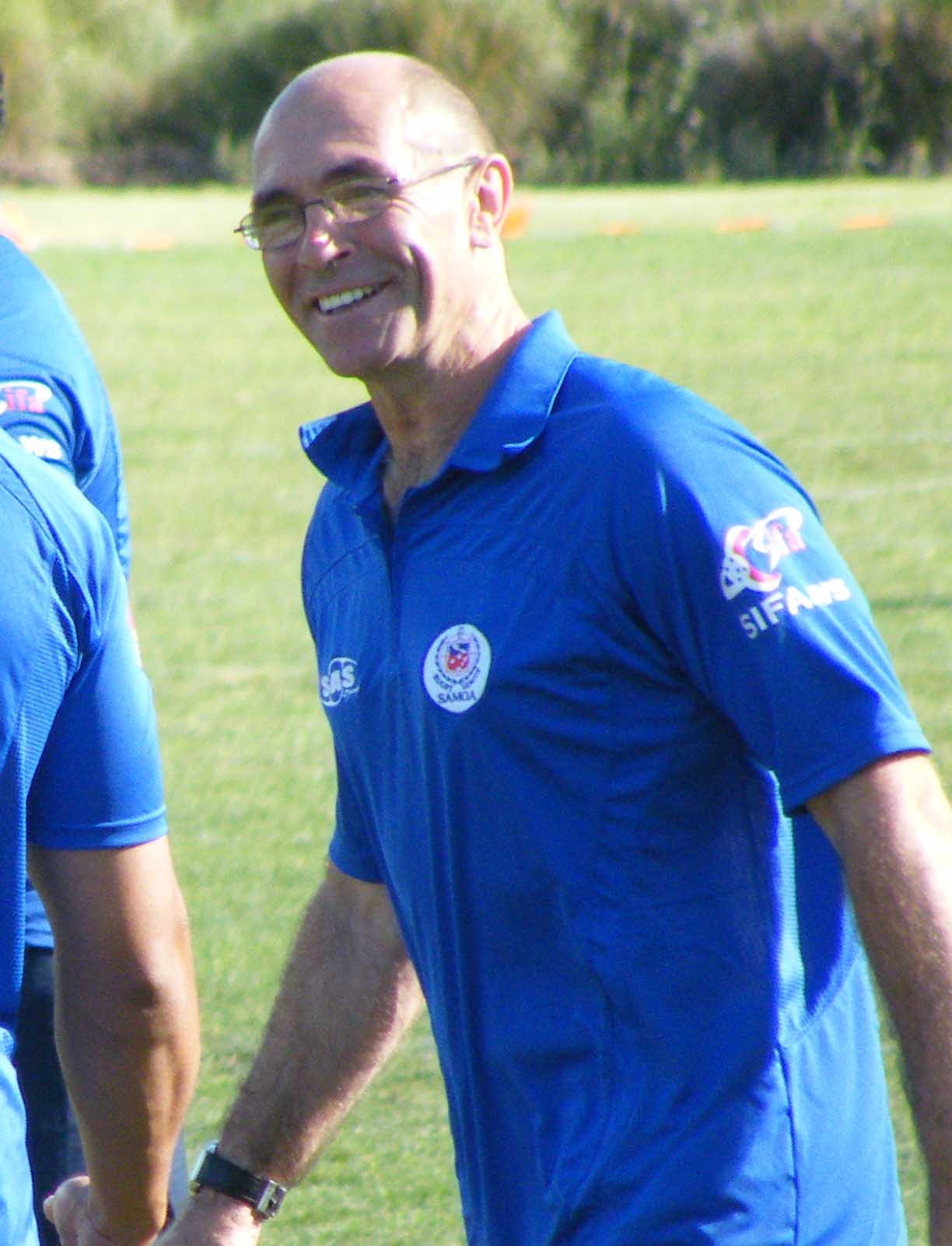
- Ackland coaching Samoa in 2008

Personal information
- Full name: Richard John Ackland
- Born: 2 August 1958 (age 68) Auckland, New Zealand

Playing information
- Height: 180 cm (5 ft 11 in)
- Weight: 89 kg (14 st 0 lb)
- Position: Second-row
Club
Years	Team	Pld	T	G	FG	P
1977–89	Mount Albert Lions
1982–83	Hunslet	18	6	0	0	18
	Total	18	6	0	0	18
Representative
Years	Team	Pld	T	G	FG	P
1979–85	Auckland
1983	New Zealand	13	4	7	0	0

Coaching information
Club
Years	Team	Gms	W	D	L	W%
	Villeneuve Leopards
Representative
Years	Team	Gms	W	D	L	W%
2007–08	Samoa	4	3	0	1	75
- Relatives: Ron Ackland (uncle)

Richard John Ackland (born 2 August 1958) is a New Zealand former professional rugby league footballer who played in the 1970s and 1980s, coach in the 1990s, 2000s and 2010s, and scout in the 2000s, and former cricketer in the 1980s, who works for the New Zealand Warriors in the National Rugby League. He represented New Zealand in 1983. His late uncle, Ron, also played for New Zealand.

== Background ==
Ackland was born in Auckland, New Zealand.

== Playing career ==
Ackland played rugby league in New Zealand in the 1980s as a forward. In 1981, he won the Lipscombe Cup while playing in the Auckland Rugby League competition for Mt Albert. He also was named man of the match in the 1981 Fox Memorial grand final, after scoring a try. In 1983, he won the Bert Humphries Memorial for best forward in the competition.

He spent the 1982–83 off-season in England with the Hunslet. In 1986, he moved to New South Wales, playing for the Murwillumbah Brothers club. In 1987, he joined Wagga Brothers as the captain-coach before returning to Mount Albert in 1989 for one last season.

=== Representative career ===
In 1983, he made his one and only appearance for the New Zealand national rugby league team, coming off the bench against Papua New Guinea. Ackland also represented Auckland and played in the 1983 draw against Hull F.C.

=== Cricket career ===
Ackland also played first-class cricket for Auckland, as a slow left-arm orthodox bowler. From six appearances he took 10 wickets at 30.50.

== Coaching career ==
=== 1990s ===
Ackland has had a long association with the Mt Albert Lions and in 1995 coached the Auckland Warriors under 16s and the Colts side in the Lion Red Cup. In 1996, he was the club's Development officer and in 1997 he was the under 19 coach.

In 1999, he was made head coach of Mount Albert and coached the Lions to the 2002 Bartercard Cup grand final victory.

In 2023, he had the honour of being the first head coach of the Mt Albert Mad Dogs Open Age restricted weight team.

=== Bulldogs scout ===
Ackland worked as a New Zealand-based scout for the Australian rugby league club the Canterbury Bulldogs where he is credited as bringing Sonny Bill Williams, Roy Asotasi and Hutch Maiava to the club.

=== Warriors coach ===
In 2006, he was appointed the Assistant Coach for the New Zealand Warriors. In 2010 he was switched with Tony Iro and Ackland became the Warrior's Toyota Cup coach. The team won the grand final in 2010, the club's first grand final victory, and repeated the feat in 2011. In 2013 he announced he was stepping down from the position at the end of the year.

=== Representative coaching ===
He was the Samoan head coach and took them to the 2008 World Cup.

== See also ==
- List of Auckland representative cricketers
