= Ron Crowe =

Australian rugby league player

Personal information
- Full name: Ronald John Crowe
- Born: 25 November 1932 West Wyalong, NSW, Australia
- Died: 24 September 2013 (aged 80)

Playing information
- Position: Front-row
Club
Years	Team	Pld	T	G	FG	P
1962	South Sydney	15	0	0	0	0
Representative
Years	Team	Pld	T	G	FG	P
1960–66	New South Wales	16	1	0	0	3
1961–66	Australia	5	0	0	0	0

Ronald John Crowe (25 November 1932 – 24 September 2013) was an Australian rugby league player.

Crowe was born in the town of West Wyalong in New South Wales. One of six siblings, Crowe had a nomadic childhood on account of his father's work as a contractor, attending several schools growing up. He was a wood cutter by trade and made his first-grade debut for West Wyalong at the age of 16.

Known as "Dookie", Crowe was a Riverina and NSW Country representative prop during the 1950s, then in 1960 made his full state debut in the interstate series against Queensland. He appeared in five Tests for Australia, which included two matches on a 1961 tour of New Zealand. In 1962, Crowe had a season with South Sydney, where he would commute from West Wyalong to play. He coached West Wyalong to premierships in 1965, 1966 and 1968.

Crowe's son in law, Ron Pilon, was a Newtown and Balmain first-grade forward.
