= Jack Sinclair (rugby league) =

Australian rugby league player (1935–2006)

Playing information
- Position: Lock / Centre / Second-row
Club
Years	Team	Pld	T	G	FG	P
1957–60	Balmain Tigers	47	6	0	0	18
1961–64	Manly Warringah	50	13	0	0	39
	Total	97	19	0	0	57
Representative
Years	Team	Pld	T	G	FG	P
1961	New South Wales	2	0	0	0	0
1961	Australia	1	0	0	0	0

Jack Sinclair (1935–2006) was an Australian rugby league player.

Sinclair competed in first-grade for Balmain from 1957 to 1960, initially as a centre, before getting later games as both a second-rower and lock. He toured New Zealand with Australia in 1961 and was their lock in the 1st Test, which he played through with a fractured wrist. From 1961 to 1964, Sinclair played for Manly Warringah.

In 1965, Sinclair joined Lithgow as captain-coach.
