= Alan Gil =

Australian rugby league player

Personal information
- Born: 1938 or 1939 (age 87–88)

Playing information
- Position: Centre
Representative
Years	Team	Pld	T	G	FG	P
1960–63	Queensland	16	3	0	0	9
1962	Australia	2	0	0	0	0

Alan Gil was an Australian former rugby league player.

Born to a Spanish father and Irish mother, Gil was raised in Cairns, attending St Augustine's College.

Gil captain-coached local Cairns club the Kangaroos, partnering his brother Neil in the centres, while another brother Frank was their five-eighth. In 1958, Gil was named best on ground for Far North Queensland in their match against Great Britain, a performance that saw him signed by a club in Toowoomba. He captained the Toowoomba representative side to the 1960 Bulimba Cup title, before returning to Cairns.

In 1962, Gil represented Australia as a centre in the 2nd and 3rd Tests against Great Britain.
