= Laurie Olliff =

New Zealand rugby league footballer

Personal information
- Full name: Lawrence John Olliff
- Born: New Zealand

Playing information
- Position: Second-row, Loose forward
Club
Years	Team	Pld	T	G	FG	P
	Western United (ARL)
Representative
Years	Team	Pld	T	G	FG	P
	Auckland
1960	New Zealand	2	0	0	0	0

Laurie Olliff is a New Zealand rugby league player who represented New Zealand in the 1960 World Cup.

== Playing career ==
Olliff played for Western United in the Auckland Rugby League competition. Western United were a combination of Mount Albert and Point Chevalier and won the Fox Memorial in 1959.

In 1960 he was selected for the New Zealand national rugby league team and played in two matches at the 1960 World Cup. He was part of the Auckland side that defended the Northern Union Cup in 1961.
