= Eric Carson =

New Zealand rugby league footballer

Personal information
- Full name: Eric Morris Carson
- Born: 11 December 1940 (age 85) New Zealand

Playing information
- Position: Scrum-half
Club
Years	Team	Pld	T	G	FG	P
	Glenora Bears
1971	St. George (WRL)
	Total	0	0	0	0	0
Representative
Years	Team	Pld	T	G	FG	P
1962–19??	Auckland
1968–70	New Zealand	4	0	0	0	0
- Source: As of 5 May 2025

Eric Carson is a New Zealand former rugby league footballer who represented New Zealand in the 1968 World Cup.

== Playing career ==
Carson played for the Glenora Bears in the Auckland Rugby League competition. He represented Auckland and was part of the sides that lost to France in 1964 and defeated Australia in 1969. He won the Rothville Trophy in 1969 as the Auckland Rugby League's Player of the Year.

In 1968 he was selected in the New Zealand national rugby league team squad for the 1968 World Cup in Australia and New Zealand. He again played for New Zealand in 1970 during the tour of Great Britain.

In 1971 Carson moved to Wellington, joining St. George and captaining the club in the Wellington Rugby League competition.
