= Tom Reid (rugby league) =

New Zealand international rugby league footballer

Personal information
- Born: 1935; New Zealand
- Died: 27 October 1969 (aged 33–34)

Playing information
- Position: Prop, Hooker
Club
Years	Team	Pld	T	G	FG	P
19??–60	Unknown (WCRL)
1961–??	Glenora (ARL)
	Total	0	0	0	0	0
Representative
Years	Team	Pld	T	G	FG	P
19??–60	West Coast
1960–61	New Zealand	2	1	0	0	3
1961–??	Auckland

Tom Reid is a New Zealand former rugby league footballer who represented New Zealand in the 1960 World Cup.

== Playing career ==
Reid played for the West Coast and in 1960 was selected to represent the New Zealand national rugby league team at the 1960 World Cup.

In 1961 Reid moved to Auckland and joined the Glenora Bears club in the Auckland Rugby League competition. He played for Auckland in their 13-8 victory over Australia that year and played in his second, and final, test match for the Kiwis.
