= Ray Sinel =

New Zealand international rugby league footballer

Personal information
- Full name: Harold Raymond Sinel
- Born: 28 June 1942 (age 83) New Zealand

Playing information
- Position: Centre, Second-row, Loose forward
Club
Years	Team	Pld	T	G	FG	P
	Eastern United (ARL)
Representative
Years	Team	Pld	T	G	FG	P
	Auckland
1963–69	New Zealand	10	1	0	0	3
- Source: As of 5 May 2025

Ray Sinel is a New Zealand former rugby league footballer who represented New Zealand in the 1968 World Cup.

== Playing career ==
A member of the Ellerslie club, Sinel played for combined Eastern United side in the Auckland Rugby League competition. In 1963 he won the Rothville Trophy as Auckland's player of the year. He was an Auckland representative and was part of the Auckland side that defeated Australia 15–14 in 1969.

Sinel was first selected for the New Zealand national rugby league team in 1963. He went on to play in ten test matches for New Zealand and was part of the squad for the 1968 World Cup.
