= John Walshe (rugby league) =

New Zealand international rugby league footballer

Personal information
- Full name: John David Michael Walshe

Playing information
- Position: Stand-off
Representative
Years	Team	Pld	T	G	FG	P
≤1962–≥63	Canterbury
≤1965–≥65	Otago
1965	New Zealand	0	0	0	0	0

John David Michael Walshe is a New Zealand former professional rugby league footballer who played in the 1960s. He played at representative level for New Zealand, Canterbury and Otago, as a stand-off.

== International honours ==
Walshe represented New Zealand on the 1965 New Zealand rugby league tour of Great Britain and France.
