= Rata Harrison =

New Zealand international rugby league footballer

- Born: Rata Wiremu Harrison; 3 January 1935; New Zealand
- Died: 30 April 2013 (aged 78); New Zealand
- Relatives: Billy Harrison (brother)
- Rugby league career

Playing information
- Position: Prop
Representative
Years	Team	Pld	T	G	FG	P
1961–62	Auckland
1961	New Zealand	2	0	0	0	0
1962	NZ Māori	1	0	1	0	2

Rata Wiremu Harrison (3 January 1935 – 30 April 2013) was a New Zealand rugby league player who represented New Zealand.

He was the brother of fellow New Zealand international Billy Harrison.

== Playing career ==
Harrison played for Auckland. He played in two test matches for New Zealand in 1961, against France.

On 13 August 1962, Harrison was part of the Auckland side who defeated Great Britain 46-13 at Carlaw Park. This was the first televised rugby league match in New Zealand, as one hour of edited highlights were shown on AKTV2 that night and other regional channels showed the highlights the following week.

Harrison died on 30 April 2013.
