= George H. Turner =

New Zealand international rugby league footballer

George Turner
Personal information
- Full name: George Henry Turner
- Born: 22 June 1937; New Zealand
- Died: 7 September 2021 (aged 84)

Playing information
- Position: Prop
Club
Years	Team	Pld	T	G	FG	P
195?–66	Papanui (CRL)
Representative
Years	Team	Pld	T	G	FG	P
1959–??	Canterbury
1962–63	South Island
1964	New Zealand	1	0	0	0	0

George H. Turner is a New Zealand former professional rugby league footballer who represented New Zealand.

== Playing career ==
From the Papanui club in the Canterbury Rugby League competition, Turner represented Canterbury and the South Island. In 1964 Turner played in one test match for the New Zealand national rugby league team, starting the second match in the series against France. The test was played at Rugby League Park in Turner's home city of Christchurch. Turner had been an unused reserve for the first test and withdrew from the third match due to injury.

== Later years ==
Turner retired in 1966. In his later years he represented North Canterbury in inter-club golf.
