= Roger Tait =

New Zealand international rugby league footballer (1938–2023)

Personal information
- Full name: Roger Bruce Tait
- Born: 1 December 1938 Huntly, New Zealand
- Died: 6 May 2023 (aged 84) Canberra, Australia

Playing information
- Position: Fullback, Centre, Stand-off
Club
Years	Team	Pld	T	G	FG	P
	Huntly United
	Glenora Bears
	Papakura Sea Eagles
	Total	0	0	0	0	0
Representative
Years	Team	Pld	T	G	FG	P
1961	Waikato
1963–68	Auckland
1965–68	New Zealand	11	3	11	0	31

Roger Bruce Tait (1 December 1938 – 6 May 2023) was a New Zealand rugby league footballer who represented New Zealand in the 1968 World Cup.

== Playing career ==
Tait was born in Huntly on 1 December 1938. He grew up in there and played for Huntly United. In 1961 he represented Waikato.

Tait then transferred to Auckland, playing for the Glenora Bears in the Auckland Rugby League competition. By 1963 Tait captained Auckland against South Africa, with Auckland winning 10–4.

During the 1964 season Tait scored 203 points for Glenora. He was first selected for the New Zealand national rugby league team in 1965 and went on to play in eleven tests for New Zealand, including three matches at the 1968 World Cup.

Tait later played for the Papakura Sea Eagles.

Tait moved to Australia, settling in Canberra, where he played for and coached the Valley Statesman RFLC, Woden Valley Rams, and Queanbeyan Kangaroos clubs. He died there on 6 May 2023.
