= Sam Edwards (rugby league) =

NZ international rugby league footballer

Personal information
- Full name: Samuel Kingi Edwards
- Born: Ōpōtiki, Bay of Plenty, New Zealand
- Died: Sydney, NSW, Australia

Playing information
- Position: Prop
Club
Years	Team	Pld	T	G	FG	P
	Marist (Auckland)
Representative
Years	Team	Pld	T	G	FG	P
1961	Bay of Plenty
1961–66	New Zealand	18	3	0	0	9
1962–66	Auckland
	New Zealand Māori

Samuel Kingi Edwards was a Maori New Zealand former international representative rugby league footballer who played in the 1960s.

While he played in Auckland, he was selected to play for the New Zealand national team as well as the New Zealand Māori team.

During the 1958 Auckland Rugby League season Edwards played for Marist. He played alongside Neville Denton. He would go on to form a formidable New Zealand front row trio partnering prop Maunga Emery and joined by Jock Butterfield at hooker. Edwards was selected to go on the 1965 New Zealand rugby league tour of Great Britain and France.
