= John Bray (rugby league) =

New Zealand rugby league footballer and administrator (born 1941)

John Bray KSM
Personal information
- Full name: John McMeekan Bray
- Born: 27 March 1941 (age 85) New Zealand

Playing information
- Position: Stand-off
Club
Years	Team	Pld	T	G	FG	P
	Hornby Panthers
	Christchurch
	Total	0	0	0	0	0
Representative
Years	Team	Pld	T	G	FG	P
	Canterbury
	South Island
1964	New Zealand	2	0	0	0	0

John McMeekan Bray KSM (born 1941) is a New Zealand former rugby league footballer who represented New Zealand.

== Playing career ==
Bray played for the Hornby Panthers, alongside his twin brother Richard, and the Christchurch club in the Canterbury Rugby League competition. He later represented Canterbury and the South Island.

Bray also played for the New Zealand national rugby league team, playing in two tests against France in 1964.

== Later years ==
After retiring, Bray had a lengthy career in rugby league administration. He was elected to the New Zealand Rugby League in March 2008 and later made a life member of the NZRL in April 2011.

In the 2024 King’s Birthday Honours, Bray was awarded the King's Service Medal, for services to rugby league.
