= Graham Mattson =

NZ RL coach and former NZ international rugby league footballer

Personal information
- Full name: Graham Victor Mattson
- Born: 10 July 1941 (age 84) Auckland, New Zealand
- Died: 25 May 2025 (aged 83)

Playing information
- Position: Loose forward, Hooker
Club
Years	Team	Pld	T	G	FG	P
	Point Chevalier
	Glenora
	Total	0	0	0	0	0
Representative
Years	Team	Pld	T	G	FG	P
	Auckland
1964–65	New Zealand	2	0	0	0	0

Coaching information
Club
Years	Team	Gms	W	D	L	W%
	Papatoetoe
Representative
Years	Team	Gms	W	D	L	W%
1990	Auckland
1994	Tonga	6	5	0	1	83
- Source: As of 29 March 2021

Graham Victor Mattson (10 July 1941 – 25 May 2025) was a New Zealand rugby league footballer and coach who represented New Zealand during the 1960s, and later coached Tonga.

== Playing career ==
Mattson was a Point Chevalier Pirates player in the Auckland Rugby League competition and also represented Auckland. Between 1964 and 1965 Mattson played in two test matches for the New Zealand national rugby league team. Mattson worked as a Police Constable.

== Coaching career ==
Mattson began his coaching career in the 1970s with Point Chevalier before coaching the Mangere East Hawks, spending most of his time with the lower grades.

In 1981 Mattson was the head coach of the new Papatoetoe Panthers club and was on their inaugural committee.

In 1990 he was appointed the Auckland coach.

Mattson later coached Tonga at the 1994 Pacific Cup.

== Death ==
Mattson died on 25 May 2025, aged 83.
