= Bruce Castle (rugby league) =

New Zealand international rugby league footballer

Personal information
- Full name: Bruce Eric Castle
- Born: 15 October 1939 (age 87) New Zealand

Playing information
- Position: Loose forward
Club
Years	Team	Pld	T	G	FG	P
	Ellerslie Eagles
Representative
Years	Team	Pld	T	G	FG	P
	Auckland
1961–67	New Zealand	2	0	0	0	0
- Spouse: Marlene Castle
- Relatives: Raelene Castle (daughter)

Bruce Eric Castle is a New Zealand rugby league footballer who represented New Zealand.

== Playing career ==
Castle played for the Ellerslie Eagles. He also represented Auckland and was part of victories over Australia in 1961 and Great Britain in 1962. He played two test matches for the New Zealand national rugby league team, including one as captain.

== Coaching career ==
Castle was the player-coach for Turvey Park in Wagga Wagga before coaching the Mangere East Hawks in the Auckland Rugby League competition.

== Later years ==
Castle was a selector for the New Zealand national rugby league team between 1999 and 2001.

== Personal life ==
Castle's wife Marlene is a four-time New Zealand Commonwealth Games lawn bowling representative. Their daughter Raelene is a sports administrator, formerly a chief executive officer of Netball New Zealand and the Canterbury-Bankstown Bulldogs then of Rugby Australia since December 2017.
