= Graham Kennedy (rugby league) =

NZ international rugby league footballer & coach

Personal information
- Full name: Graham Michael Kennedy
- Born: 23 April 1939 Greymouth, New Zealand
- Died: 9 September 2002 (aged 63) Penrith, New South Wales, Australia

Playing information
- Position: Fullback, Wing, Centre, Halfback
Club
Years	Team	Pld	T	G	FG	P
	Marist (WCRL)
	Wagga Kangaroos
	Total	0	0	0	0	0
Representative
Years	Team	Pld	T	G	FG	P
	West Coast
1959–65	South Island
1961–66	New Zealand	21	1	4	0	11

Coaching information
Club
Years	Team	Gms	W	D	L	W%
	Wagga Kangaroos
	Riverina
	Total	0	0	0	0

Graham Kennedy (23 April 1939 – 9 September 2002), also known by the nickname of "Ginger", was a New Zealand rugby league footballer and coach who represented New Zealand.

== Early years ==
Kennedy attended Marist Brothers High School where he played in the first eleven and first fifteen. He twice made the Schoolboy Kiwis side.

Kennedy then attended teachers college in Christchurch, where he played two seasons of rugby union and made the Canterbury Colts side.

== Playing career ==
Kennedy played rugby league for the Marist club in the West Coast Rugby League competition and also represented the West Coast. He was a South Island representative between 1959 and 1965.

Kennedy also played for the New Zealand national rugby league team, playing in 64 games, including 21 tests between 1961 and 1966. He played four matches as captain of the Kiwis.

In 1963, he won the New Zealand Rugby League's player of the year award.

While in Greymouth, Kennedy taught at his old school and Grey Main School. He was the first lay principal of Christian Brothers High School.

== Coaching career ==
In 1967, Kennedy moved to Australia, becoming the player-coach of the Wagga Kangaroos in the Group 9 Rugby League competition. He became a respected coach, in 1980 Kennedy was only one of three to hold the top NSWRL grading outside of Sydney.

Kennedy taught at St Michael's Regional High School in Wagga Wagga for 27 years before becoming the principal of St Dominic's College, Penrith in 1994, serving until his death in 2002.
