= Pat White (rugby league) =

New Zealand international rugby league footballer

Personal information
- Full name: Patrick Manuhere Verden White
- Born: New Zealand

Playing information
- Position: Wing
Club
Years	Team	Pld	T	G	FG	P
	Marist (CRL)
Representative
Years	Team	Pld	T	G	FG	P
	Canterbury
	South Island
1962	New Zealand Māori
1964	New Zealand	3	1	0	0	4

Pat White was a New Zealand rugby league footballer who represented New Zealand. His brother, Jim, also played for New Zealand.

== Playing career ==
White and his brother played for the Marist club in the Canterbury Rugby League competition. He represented both Canterbury and the South Island.

White represented New Zealand Schoolboys in 1954 and in 1962 played for New Zealand Māori.

White played in three test matches for the New Zealand national rugby league team in 1964 against France, scoring one try.
