= Bob Irvine =

New Zealand international rugby league footballer

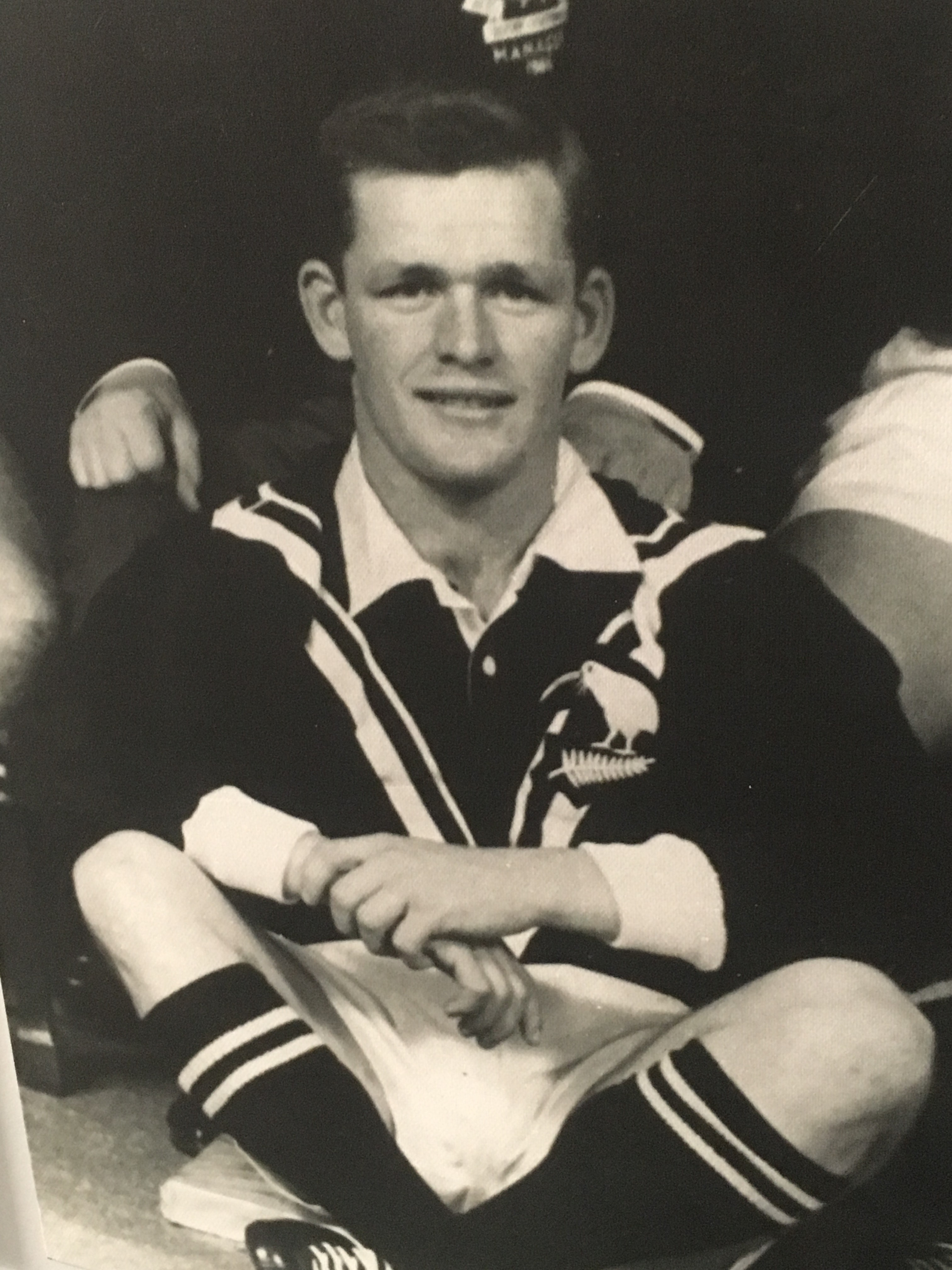
- Robert Irvine in his New Zealand Kiwi's uniform

Personal information
- Full name: Robert Samuel John Irvine
- Born: 9 September 1940 (age 85) Christchurch, New Zealand

Playing information
- Position: Halfback
Club
| Years | Team | Pld | T | G | FG | P |
|---|---|---|---|---|---|---|
| | Marist (CRL) |
Representative
| Years | Team | Pld | T | G | FG | P |
| 1962–69 | Canterbury |
| 1963–69 | South Island |
| 1965–67 | New Zealand | 7 | 1 | 0 | 0 | 3 |

Robert (Bob) Samuel John Irvine is a New Zealand former rugby league footballer who represented New Zealand.

== Playing career ==
Irvine played at halfback for Canterbury and the South Island. He played for Canterbury in their 1962 match against Great Britain and for the South Island in their 1963 match against South Africa.

In 1965, Irvine made his debut for New Zealand, becoming Kiwi #442. Irvine went on to play in seven test matches for New Zealand.

Irvine won the New Zealand Rugby League's player of the year award in 1968.
