= Ken McCracken (rugby league) =

New Zealand international rugby league footballer (1940-2019)

Personal information
- Full name: Kenneth Robert McCracken
- Born: 11 December 1940 (age 85) New Zealand
- Died: 28 October 2019 (aged 78)

Playing information
- Position: Wing
Club
Years	Team	Pld	T	G	FG	P
	Ellerslie Eagles
	Ponsonby Ponies
	Total	0	0	0	0	0
Representative
Years	Team	Pld	T	G	FG	P
1961–68	Auckland
1961–64	New Zealand	7	1	0	0	4
- Relatives: Jarrod McCracken (son)

Kenneth Robert McCracken (1941 – 28 October 2019) was a New Zealand rugby league footballer who represented New Zealand. His son, Jarrod, also represented New Zealand.

== Playing career ==
McCracken played for the Ellerslie Eagles club in the Auckland Rugby League competition, and also played for Ellerslie's combined district team Eastern United. He was an Auckland representative and played in seven test matches for New Zealand. He was first selected for New Zealand for their 1961 tour of Great Britain and France and again played on their 1963 tour of Australia and in 1964 home matches against France.

McCracken later played for the Ponsonby Ponies club in Auckland.

== Death ==
McCracken died from metastatic prostate cancer on 28 October 2019.
