= Jim Bond (rugby league) =

New Zealand rugby league footballer and coach

Personal information
- Full name: James Arthur Bond
- Born: 23 July 1937 (age 87); New Zealand

Playing information
- Position: Stand-off
Club
Years	Team	Pld	T	G	FG	P
	Papanui (CRL)
Representative
Years	Team	Pld	T	G	FG	P
1958–62	Canterbury	3	1	0	0	3
1958–64	South Island	6
1961–68	New Zealand	14	1	0	0	3

Coaching information
Club
Years	Team	Gms	W	D	L	W%
1970–71	University (CRL)

James Arthur Bond is a New Zealand former rugby league footballer who represented New Zealand fourteen times, including captaining the side in the 1968 World Cup.

== Playing career ==
Bond played for the Papanui club in the Canterbury Rugby League competition and represented both Canterbury and the South Island. He first made the New Zealand national rugby league team in 1961 when he was part of the tour of Great Britain and France. Bond was a continual selection for the Kiwis until 1964. After that year he was not selected again until the 1968 season.

In 1968 Bond was selected to captain the side to the 1968 World Cup.

== Coaching career ==
After retirement Bond coached the University club in the Canterbury Rugby League competition.
