= Doug Ellwood =

New Zealand international rugby league footballer and coach

Personal information
- Full name: John Douglas Ellwood
- Born: 12 June 1941 (age 85) Auckland Region, New Zealand

Playing information
- Position: Fullback, Stand-off
Club
Years	Team	Pld	T	G	FG	P
	Ellerslie
	Eastern United
	City-Newton
	Total	0	0	0	0	0
Representative
Years	Team	Pld	T	G	FG	P
	Auckland
1963–68	New Zealand	7	0	0	0	0

Coaching information
Club
Years	Team	Gms	W	D	L	W%
	Mount Wellington

Doug Ellwood is a New Zealand former rugby league footballer who represented New Zealand in the 1968 World Cup.

== Playing career ==
Ellwood originally played for Ellerslie. During the Auckland Rugby League's "district era" he represented Eastern United, a combination that included the Ellerslie club. In 1967, while playing for City-Newton, Ellwood won both the Lipscombe Cup and Rothville Trophy, Auckland's sportsman of the year and player of the year awards.

Ellwood represented Auckland. He was involved in several notable victories with Auckland, including being part of the sides that defeated Australia 13-8 in 1961, Great Britain 46-13 in 1962 and South Africa 10-4 in 1963.

Ellwood was first selected for the New Zealand national rugby league team in 1963 and went on to play in seven test matches for New Zealand, starting at both fullback and stand off. Ellwood was part of the 1968 World Cup squad. The team did not win a match at the tournament.

== Coaching career ==
Ellwood later coached the Mount Wellington Warriors to a Phelan Shield victory.
