= Mita Mohi =

New Zealand international rugby league player

Mita Mohi MBE JP
Personal information
- Full name: Mita Hikairo Mohi
- Born: 22 May 1939 New Zealand
- Died: 20 November 2016 (aged 77)

Playing information
- Position: Prop
Club
Years	Team	Pld	T	G	FG	P
1960–64	Marist-Western
1965	Papanui
1966–74	Marist-Western
1975–77	Riccarton
	Total	0	0	0	0	0
Representative
Years	Team	Pld	T	G	FG	P
1960–73	Canterbury	42
1962–72	New Zealand Māori	2
1962–63	South Island	4
1972	New Zealand	1	0	0	0	0
1968	Southern Zone	1

Coaching information
Club
Years	Team	Gms	W	D	L	W%
1977	Riccarton

Mita Hikairo Mohi MBE JP (22 May 1939 – 20 November 2016) was a New Zealand exponent and teacher of the art of traditional Māori weaponry and a former professional rugby league footballer who represented New Zealand at the 1972 World Cup.

== Early life ==
Mohi was born in 1939 of Ngāi Te Rangi, Ngāti Ranginui, Ngāti Rangiwewehi and Ngāti Tūwharetoa descent. As a child he learned the use of the taiaha from his father. Mohi's early working life was spent as a train driver for New Zealand Railways.

== Rugby league career ==
Mohi played for the Marist-Western club in the Canterbury Rugby League competition. He represented Canterbury, New Zealand Māori, the Southern Zone and the South Island. In 1962 Mohi was part of the Canterbury side that defeated Auckland 16–13 to win the Northern Union Cup.

Mohi was selected for the New Zealand national rugby league team squad in the 1972 World Cup. His first, and only, test match was against France. Mohi injured his calf muscle while performing the haka and had to be replaced. Mohi also played in two other games for New Zealand while in Britain.

He moved to the Riccarton club in 1975 and spent three years at the club, the last as player-coach.

== Mau rākau ==
In the late 1970s, Mohi began teaching the art of traditional Māori weaponry, mau rākau, and established the Mokoia taiaha wānanga to train boys and men in the art of using the taiaha. He has also run taiaha wānanga throughout New Zealand and developed a mau rākau programme that has run in New Zealand prisons since the early 1990s.

== Other activities ==
Mohi was also a professional wrestler for a time and was prominent in national Māori tennis, including a second placing in the Aotearoa Māori tennis championships. He worked as a lecturer at Waiariki Polytechnic and served as a member of the New Zealand Parole Board and a justice of the peace.

In 1982, Mohi and his wife Hukarere opened the first kōhanga reo in Rotorua, following the birth of their first grandchild.

Mohi died on 20 November 2016.

== Honours and awards ==
In the 1995 New Year Honours, Mohi was appointed a Member of the Order of the British Empire, for service to youth. With his wife, Mohi received a Rotorua District Council community award for voluntary services in 2007. He was recognised for his longstanding and ongoing contribution to mau rākau at the 2012 National Waiata Māori Music Awards, where he received the Keeper of Traditions Award, and the 2012 Te Waka Toi Awards, where he was awarded the Ngā Tohu o Tā Kīngi Īhaka (Sir Kīngi Īhaka award).
