= Mel Cooke =

New Zealand rugby league player (1934–2013)

Personal information
- Full name: Melville Lance Cooke
- Born: 30 May 1934 Christchurch, New Zealand
- Died: 5 September 2013 (aged 79) Christchurch, New Zealand

Playing information
- Height: 178 cm (5 ft 10 in)
- Weight: 86 kg (13 st 8 lb)
- Position: Scrum-half, Loose forward
Club
Years	Team	Pld	T	G	FG	P
19??–64	Hornby
1965–68	Monaro
	Total	0	0	0	0	0
Representative
Years	Team	Pld	T	G	FG	P
1953–??	Canterbury
	South Island
1959–64	New Zealand	23	5	0	0	15
	NSW Country

Coaching information
Representative
Years	Team	Gms	W	D	L	W%
1963–64	Hornby
1965–68	Monaro
1969–78	Hornby
1971	Canterbury

Melville Lance Cooke (30 May 1934 – 5 September 2013) was a New Zealand rugby league player who represented New Zealand twenty-three times between 1959 and 1964.

== Playing career ==
Cooke was a member of the Hornby club in the Canterbury Rugby League competition. He was the player-coach when Hornby made the national tournament finals in 1962 and 1964 and when they won the Thacker Shield in 1964.

A Canterbury and South Island representative, in 1962 Cooke was captain of the first Canterbury team to win the Northern Union Cup from Auckland at the Addington Showgrounds.

Cooke played in 23 games for New Zealand, including at the 1960 World Cup. He played in eighteen consecutive tests between 1960 and 1964. Cooke was the captain for the last three seasons before accepting a player-coach position in Canberra in 1965.

== Coaching career ==
Cooke took up a player-coach position with Monaro in 1965. While there he captained the side against the 1966 British Lions and was selected for New South Wales Country.

In 1969 Cooke returned to Hornby as coach. He was a Canterbury selector and coach in 1971 and again coached Hornby in 1978.

== Legacy ==
Cooke was named one of New Zealand Rugby League's "Legends of League" in 1995.

In 2009 Cooke was named in the NZRL's team of the century.

Cooke died in September 2013, aged 79.
