= Don Hammond (rugby league) =

New Zealand international rugby league footballer and coach (died 2022)

Personal information
- Full name: Roger Donald Hammond
- Born: 1 August 1936 Auckland, New Zealand
- Died: 30 July 2022 (aged 85)

Playing information
- Position: Second-row
Club
Years	Team	Pld	T	G	FG	P
	Mount Albert Lions
	Western United
	Eastern Districts
	Total	0	0	0	0	0
Representative
Years	Team	Pld	T	G	FG	P
	Auckland
1961–65	New Zealand	21	3	0	0	9

Coaching information
Representative
Years	Team	Gms	W	D	L	W%
1978–79	Auckland

Roger Donald Hammond (1 August 1936 – 30 July 2022) was a New Zealand rugby league footballer who represented New Zealand between 1961 and 1965.

== Early life and family ==
Hammond was born in the Auckland suburb of Balmoral on 1 August 1936, the son of Dorothy Gertrude Hammond (née Rankin) and Frederick Mervyn Hammond.

== Playing career ==
Hammond originally played for the Mount Albert Lions in the Auckland Rugby League competition, playing for Western United when the Lions senior side was merged as part of the ARL's district scheme.

He later moved to Eastern Districts and in 1964 won the Rothville Trophy as the Auckland Rugby League player of the year. That year he also won the New Zealand Rugby League's player of the year award.

Hammond represented and captained Auckland and first played for the New Zealand national rugby league team in 1961. He went on to play in twenty one test matches, including six as captain.

== Coaching career ==
In 1978 and 1979 Hammond coached Auckland.

Hammond was named one of the New Zealand Rugby League's Legends of League in 2010. He died on 30 July 2022, at the age of 85.
