= Ron Ackland =

NZ RL coach and former NZ international rugby league footballer

Personal information
- Full name: Ronald Charles Ackland
- Born: 27 December 1934 Auckland, New Zealand
- Died: 25 October 2013 (aged 78) Auckland, New Zealand

Playing information
- Height: 180 cm (5 ft 11 in)
- Weight: 92 kg (203 lb)
- Position: Centre, Second-row
Club
Years	Team	Pld	T	G	FG	P
	Mt Wellington
	Mount Albert Lions
1961	City Newton
1965–70	Goulburn
1971–73	Inverell
	Total	0	0	0	0	0
Representative
Years	Team	Pld	T	G	FG	P
	Auckland
1954–63	New Zealand	18	1	0	0	3

Coaching information
Club
Years	Team	Gms	W	D	L	W%
1965–70	Goulburn
1971–73	Inverell
1974–76	Mt Wellington
	Total	0	0	0	0
Representative
Years	Team	Gms	W	D	L	W%
1977–78	New Zealand	6	1	0	5	17
- Relatives: John Ackland (nephew)

Ronald Charles Ackland (27 December 1934 − 25 October 2013) was a New Zealand professional rugby league footballer who played in the 1950s, 1960s and 1970s, and coached in the 1960s and 1970s, who represented New Zealand in the 1957 and 1960 World Cups, and coached New Zealand in the 1977 World Cup. His nephew, John, also played for New Zealand.

== Playing career ==
Ackland was a Mt Wellington player. During the Auckland Rugby League's District era he played for Eastern Districts. In 1960, Ackland won the inaugural Rothville Trophy for player of the year, a feat he repeated in 1961. Ackland also played for the Mount Albert Lions and captained the City Newton Dragons in 1961.

He was selected for New Zealand in 1954 and went on to play in 18 test matches for the Kiwis. He was part of the 1957 and 1960 World Cup squads. He captained the Kiwis twice in 1961. Ackland, along with Neville Denton and Gary Phillips, withdrew from the 1961 tour of Great Britain due to a dispute over allowances.

He then moved to the New South Wales country and was captain-coach of Goulburn between 1965 and 1970 and Inverell between 1971 and 1973.

== Coaching career ==
After retirement Ackland became Mt Wellington's head coach. In 1976, he won the Hyland Memorial Cup as the Auckland Rugby League's coach of the year.

Ackland became the coach of New Zealand in 1977, taking the squad to the 1977 World Cup. In his two-year reign the Kiwis won one out of six test matches.

== Later life and death ==
Ackland was inducted as a New Zealand Rugby League "Legend of League" in 1995. He is an Auckland Rugby League Immortal.

In 2009, he was named in the New Zealand Rugby League Team of the Century in the second row.

Ackland died following complications from heart surgery on 25 October 2013, aged 78, in his hometown of Auckland.
