= Maunga Emery =

Personal information
- Full name: Hone Komanga Emery
- Born: 2 April 1933 New Zealand
- Died: 1 September 2011 (aged 78) Ōtāhuhu, New Zealand

Playing information

Rugby union
Representative
Years	Team	Pld	T	G	FG	P
1952–1957	Combined Services
1954–1959	Auckland
1954–1958	New Zealand Māori

Rugby league
- Position: Prop
Club
Years	Team	Pld	T	G	FG	P
	Glenora Bears
Representative
Years	Team	Pld	T	G	FG	P
1961–1967	Auckland
1961–66	New Zealand	23	3	0	0	9
1962–67	New Zealand Māori

Hone Komanga "Maunga" Emery (2 April 1933 – 1 September 2011) was a New Zealand rugby footballer who represented New Zealand in rugby league and the New Zealand Māori in rugby union.

== Rugby union career ==
Emery represented Auckland between 1954 and 1959 and played for New Zealand Māori from 1954 to 1958. Between 1952 and 1957 he also played for the Combined Services side.

== Rugby league career ==
Emery played for the Glenora Bears in the Auckland Rugby League competition. He made his New Zealand national rugby league team debut in 1961 against Australia. That same year Emery was also part of the Auckland side that defeated Australia for the first time.

Emery played for Auckland between 1961 and 1966 and New Zealand Māori in 1962 and 1967.

He finished his career having played 23 Test matches for New Zealand.

== Family ==
Emery is the grandfather of New Zealand rugby league international Stacey Jones. His Great Great grand nephew, Jason Emery, made the New Zealand Schools rugby union team in 2010.(this article incorrectly calls him Jason's great grand father)

Emery died on 1 September 2011 at Middlemore Hospital, Auckland, aged 79.
