= Brian Reidy =

New Zealand international rugby league footballer

Personal information
- Full name: Brian Thomas Reidy
- Born: 27 January 1939
- Died: 2 June 2016 (aged 77) Auckland, New Zealand

Playing information
- Position: Wing
Club
Years	Team	Pld	T	G	FG	P
	Marist
Representative
Years	Team	Pld	T	G	FG	P
	Auckland
1959–66	New Zealand	19	8	0	0	24

Brian Thomas Reidy (27 January 1939 – 2 June 2016) was a New Zealand rugby league player who represented New Zealand.

== Playing career ==
Reidy played for the Marist club and represented Auckland. He made his debut for the New Zealand national rugby league team in 1959, becoming Kiwi #383, but did not make his test match debut until 1961, against Australia at Carlaw Park. Between 1959 and 1966, Reidy played 65 games for New Zealand, including 19 tests, scoring 34 tries in all. He could play anywhere in the backline, but turned out on the wing in all but one of his test match appearances.

== Later years ==
Reidy went on serve as an administrator, on the NZ Kiwis Association, the Auckland Leagues Club and the board of the New Zealand Rugby League Museum. In 2015 he was made a life member of the New Zealand Rugby League.

Reidy died in Auckland on 2 June 2016.
