= Ellerslie Eagles =

NZ rugby league club, based in Ellerslie

Club information
- Full name: Ellerslie Eagles Rugby League Football Club
- Colours: Red / White / Navy Blue
- Founded: 1912; 114 years ago
- Website: www.facebook.com/EERLFC/timeline

Current details
- Ground: Ellerslie Domain
- Coach: TJ Atuahiva
- Captain: Robert Tamapeau
- Competition: Auckland Rugby League

Records
- Premierships: 1957, 1974
- Runners-up: 1972
- Minor premierships: 1957, 1972, 1974
- Roope Rooster: 1955, 1956, 1959, 1968, 2004
- Stormont Shield: 1955, 1959, 1968, 1974
- Sharman Cup: 1949, 1981, 1986, 1991, 1992, 2002
- Norton Cup: 1925, 1927
- Stallard Cup: 1927

The Ellerslie Eagles are a rugby league club based in Ellerslie, New Zealand. The club was founded in 1912 and competes in Auckland Rugby League competitions. Its premier team competes in the Sharman cup. The club celebrated its centenary Queen's Birthday weekend, 2012.

== History ==
=== 1910s - 30s ===
The club was formed as the Ellerslie Wanderers at a meeting in April 1912 at the Ellerslie Hotel. However, with the outbreak of World War I in 1914 the club went into temporary recess for four years.

The club was reestablished on 26 July 1919 as the Ellerslie United Rugby League Club. With its reestablishment, the club adopted the Red, Blue and White colours that it still currently uses. They didn't however field a team until August 28, 1920 in the fourth grade competition, which was nearing the end of the season at the time. They also fielded a third grade side in a friendly match with Kingsland Athletic on September 25.

In 1925 they won their first ever grade trophy by taking out the B Division.

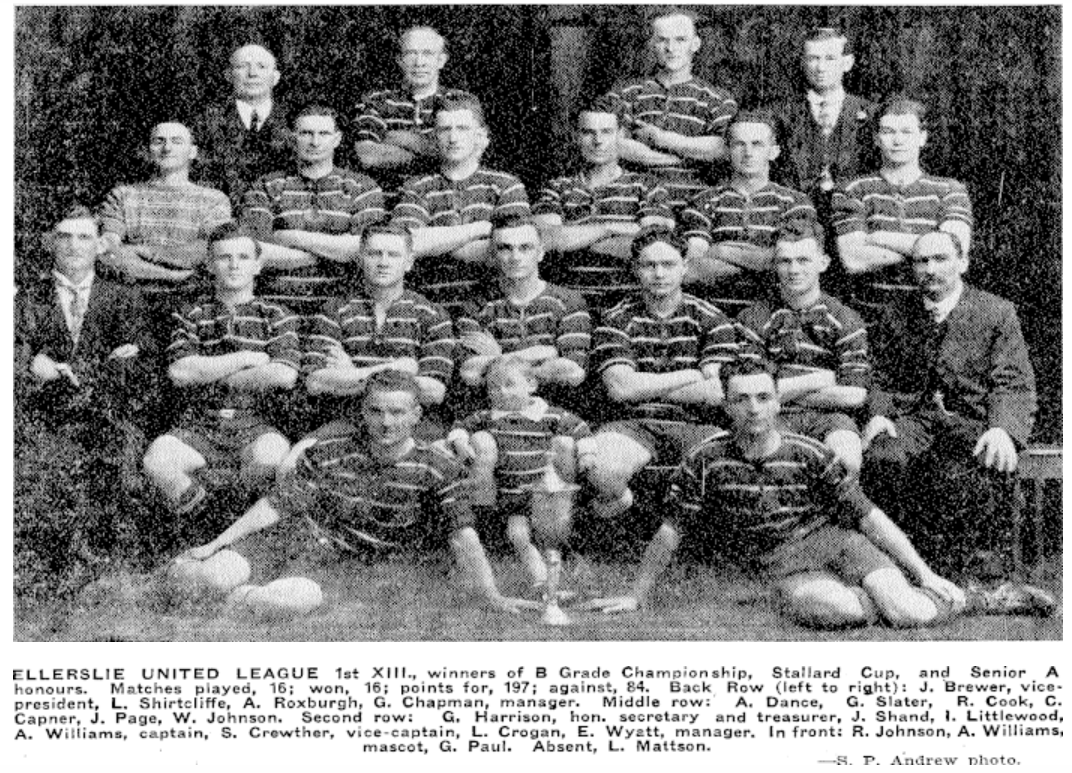
The 1927 B Grade champion side.

They won it again in 1927 and earned the right to play in the promotion relegation match with Grafton. They defeated them 11-3 and qualified to play in the A Grade (Monteith Shield - the forerunner to the Fox Memorial) for 1928.

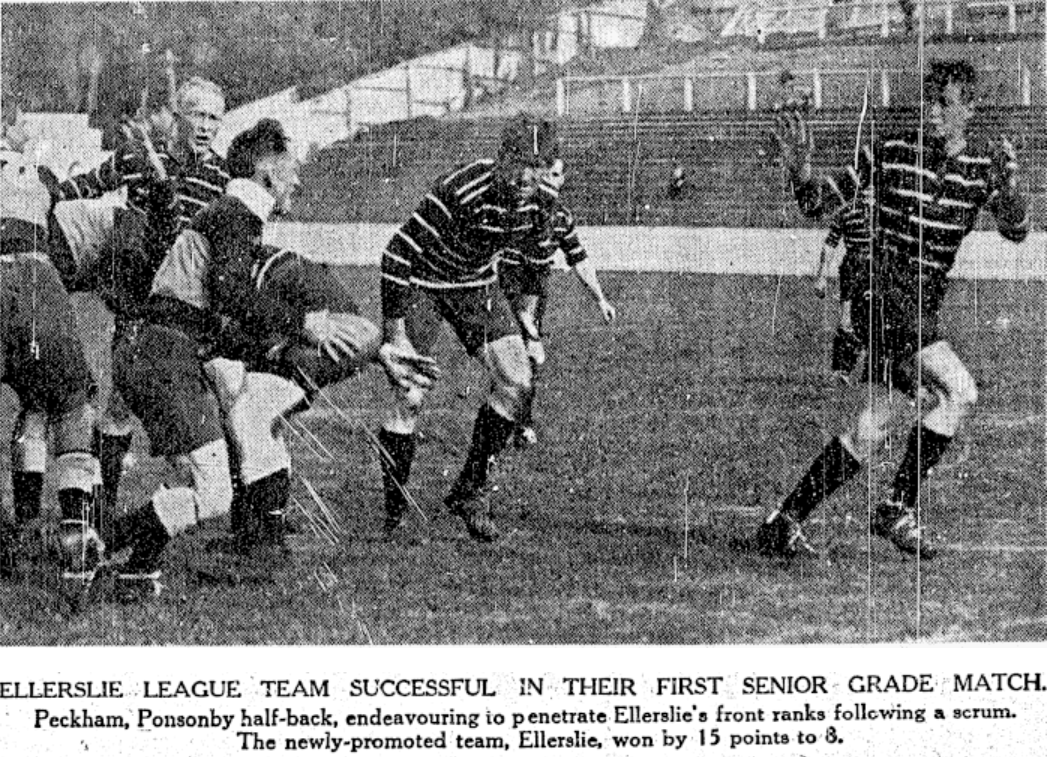
Ellerslie v Ponsonby on April 28, 1928. Ellerslie won 15 points to 8.

In their first 1928 A grade match they upset Ponsonby 15-8 at Carlaw Park with tries by Davis, Allen, and Dance, and 3 conversions by Shand. They however finished in last place with a 3 win, 9 loss record. In 1929 they went win less but beat Point Chevalier 5-0 in the promotion-relegation match to remain in the top grade. In 1930 they finished second to last with a 4-18 record. In 1931, at request of the Auckland Rugby League, an amalgamation of the Ellerslie, Otahuhu and Mangere clubs took place, but all plans of this merger were abandoned before the year ended. Their short-lived merger with Otahuhu saw another last placed finish with a 1-1-10 record. The Auckland Rugby League decided at this point to reduce the number of first grade teams after concerns about the falling standard of play in recent seasons and Ellerslie were dropped from the top grade. They were not to regain a place in the Fox Memorial grade for several years.

=== 1940s ===
In May, 1942 Mr. G. Chapman of the Ellerslie club was made a life member of the Auckland Rugby League due to his 30 years of service to the game in Auckland.

=== 1950s - 60s ===
The club had a golden period in the 1950s, claiming the 1955 Roope Rooster and Stormont Shield, the 1956 Roope Rooster, the 1957 Fox Memorial and Rukutai Shield and the 1959 Roope Rooster and Stormont Shield. The club also played against three clubs from the New South Wales Rugby League premiership, losing to the Balmain Tigers 35–7 in 1956, defeating the Manly-Warringah Sea Eagles 16–15 in 1958 and losing to the St. George Dragons 10–11 in 1959.

During the 1960s the Auckland Rugby League instituted a districts programme and Ellerslie, City Newton and Eastern Suburbs combined to form Eastern Districts. The combination won almost every trophy between 1960 and 1963 before the clubs regained their separate identities. In 1968 the Pakuranga club was formed as a feeder club to Ellerslie. Former New Zealand national rugby league team representative Maurie Robertson was appointed as coach in 1970.

=== 1970s - present ===
The club officially adopted the Eagles name in 1971. During the 1980s the club bounced between the first and second divisions, with Sharman Cup (second division) wins in 1981 and 1986. They again lifted the Sharman Cup in 1991 and 1992. The club was affiliated to the Auckland City Vulcans during the 1994 Lion Red Cup and joined the Eastern Tornadoes side with the advent of the Bartercard Cup in 2000. In 2004 the club left the Tornadoes to become part of the Otahuhu-Ellerslie Leopards side in the Bartercard Cup.

The club celebrated its centenary on Queen's Birthday weekend 2012.

== Notable players ==
Ellerslie's best player ever is arguably Cyril Eastlake. Other Kiwi representatives include Ivan Littlewood, Craddock Dufty (1930), Wally Somers, Brian Campbell, Bruce Castle, Gary Phillips, Graham Brown, Bruce Castle, Ken McCracken, Jim Patterson, Ray Sinel, Brian Clark, Rob Orchard, Ken Stirling, Chris Jordan, Doug Gailey, Lyndsay Proctor, Gary Kemble, Logan Swann, Murray Eade, Tame Tupou and Kieran Foran.

Both Sean Hoppe and Kevin Iro played for the Glen Innes Falcons, a feeder club to Ellerslie during the 1980s.

Other notable players include Aaron and Stuart Lester, Doc Murray, Tongan internationals David Fisiiahi and Filimone Lolohea, Glen Fisiiahi and Liam Foran.

== Ellerslie Senior Team Records (1912-1943) ==
The season record for the most senior men’s team in the club.

Season	Grade	Name	Played	W	D	L	PF	PA	PD	Pts	Position (Teams)
1912	2nd Grade	Ellerslie United	9	2	0	7	9	69	-60	4	Approximately 6th of 8, full results unknown
1913	2nd Grade	Ellerslie United	1	0	0	1	0	3	-3	0	7 Teams, results unknown
1914-20	Did not field any teams in regular season	Ellerslie United	-	-	-	-	-	-	-	-	-
1921	2nd Grade	Ellerslie United	3	1	0	2	35	13	22	2	Approximately 4th of 10, full results unknown
1922	2nd Grade	Ellerslie United	0	0	0	0	0	0	0	0	Last of 13 teams. Withdrew after 2 rounds with no results reported
1923	2nd Grade	Ellerslie United	3	1	0	2	5	27	-22	2	Approximately 9th of 12, full results unknown
1924	1st Grade (Monteith Shield)	Ellerslie United	14	3	1	10	87	191	-104	7	9th of 9
1925	B Division (Norton Cup)	Ellerslie United	12	8	2	2	89	62	27	18	1st of 5
1926	B Division (Norton Cup)	Ellerslie United	14	7	2	5	103	98	5	16	3rd of 6
1927	B Division (Norton Cup)	Ellerslie United	13	13	0	0	151	75	76	26	1st of 7 (winning score v Mangere is missing) Beat Grafton 11-3 in pro-rel game for promotion to 1st Grade.
1928	1st Grade (Monteith Shield)	Ellerslie United	12	3	0	9	102	162	-60	6	7th of 7, Beat Grafton in pro-rel 15-13 to stay in 1st Grade.
1929	1st Grade (Monteith Shield)	Ellerslie United	14	0	0	14	86	235	-149	0	8th of 8, Beat Point Chevalier in pro-rel game 5-0 to stay in 1st Grade.
1930	1st Grade (Monteith Shield)	Ellerslie United	13	4	1	8	141	171	-30	9	7th of 8
1931	1st Grade (Fox Memorial)	Ellerslie-Otahuhu	12	1	1	10	85	237	-152	3	7th of 7 (combined team)
1932	2nd Grade	Ellerslie United	16	6	0	6	62	77	-15	12	Approximately 6th of 9
1933	2nd Grade	Ellerslie United	12	4	1	7	47	125	-78	9	6th of 7
1934	2nd Grade	Ellerslie United	14	0	1	13	31	141	-110	1	6th of 6
1935	3rd Grade	Ellerslie United	15	4	1	4	66	43	23	9	Approximately 6th of 14
1936	3rd Grade	Ellerslie United	18	11	1	2	222	59	163	23	1st of 17, W v Ponsonby 11-10 in final
1937	3rd Grade	Ellerslie United	11	8	0	1	93	24	69	16	2nd of 7 in section 1
1938	Senior B (Sharman Cup)	Ellerslie United	12	5	2	5	114	59	55	12	3rd of 6
1939	Senior B (Sharman Cup)	Ellerslie United	8	6	0	2	123	36	87	12	2nd of 6
1940	Senior B (Sharman Cup)	Ellerslie United	6	4	0	2	41	40	1	8	3rd of 5 (incomplete record)
1941	Senior B (Sharman Cup)	Ellerslie United	10	7	0	3	88	46	42	14	2nd of 8 (incomplete record)
1912-43	TOTAL		243	98	13	116	1788	2012	-224	209	

== All time top point scorers (1924, 1928-1931) ==
The point scoring lists are compiled from matches played in matches from the first grade championship, the Roope Rooster, Phelan Shield, and Sharman Cup only. One off matches and exhibition matches are not included. The statistics for the combined Ellerslie-Otahuhu team of 1931 are included. Matches in the B Division are not included due to a lack of records available at this stage.

Top point scorers
No	Player	Start	End	Games	Tries	Con	Pen	DG	Pts
1	J Hemingway	1928	1931	39	7	13	14	1	77
2	Craddock Dufty	1929	1931	18	1	13	7	0	43
3	Ivan Littlewood	1928	1929	19	11	1	1	0	37
4	Leslie Olliff	1929	1931	39	5	6	3	0	33
5	John Shand	1924	1928	14	3	8	0	1	27
6	A Hickey	1930	1931	25	8	0	1	0	26
7	Stan Webb	1930	1931	27	5	1	4	0	25
8	Robert (Bob) Crewther	1928	1929	27	5	1	2	0	21
9	Horatio Drew	1930	1931	22	6	1	0	0	20
10	Quirke	1929	1931	26	6	0	0	0	18
11	Bryan	1924	-	15	5	1	0	0	17
12	Selby Crewther	1928	1929	22	0	6	2	0	16
13=	A Hobbs	1929	1931	38	5	0	0	0	15
13=	Peebles	1924	-	14	3	1	1	1	15
15=	Coster	1930	-	8	4	0	0	0	12
15=	S Davis	1928	-	11	4	0	0	0	12
15=	Victor Speight	1928	-	12	4	0	0	0	12

== Ellerslie grade championships (1912-41) ==
- 1924 6th Grade B (Ellerslie B)
- 1925 B Grade (2nd division) - Norton Cup
- 1927 B Grade (2nd division) - Norton Cup
- 1932 Senior Schoolboys
- 1934 6th Grade
- 1936 3rd Grade
- 1939 Intermediate Schoolboys
- 1941 7th Grade
