= Reg Cooke =

New Zealand international rugby league footballer

Personal information
- Full name: Reginald Stewart Cooke
- Born: 14 November 1939; New Zealand
- Died: 2021 (aged 81–82)

Playing information
- Position: Wing, Centre
Club
Years	Team	Pld	T	G	FG	P
19??–60	Unknown (WRL)
1961–63	Papakura (ARL)
1964	City-Newton (ARL)					205
	Unknown (QRL)
	Total	0	0	0	0	205
Representative
Years	Team	Pld	T	G	FG	P
19??–60	Waikato
1960–64	New Zealand	8	0	10	0	20
1961–??	Auckland
1967	Queensland Firsts	4	1	0	0	3

Reginald Stewart Cooke (1939–2021) was a New Zealand International rugby league footballer in 1959/65 who represented New Zealand in the 1960 World Cup, remembered on the roll of honour as Kiwi #397 and "one of the outstanding post-war centres in rugby league. He was a Queensland State Representative in 1966 and New South Wales Group Representative 1968" according to an article by the NEW SOUTH WALES RUGBY FOOTBALL LEAGUE, 165 Phillip Street, Sydney. 28 8565.

== Playing career ==
Cooke originally played in the Waikato Rugby League competition and represented Waikato. In 1960 he was selected for the New Zealand national rugby league team squad for the 1960 World Cup but did not play in a match.

Instead, he made his debut in 1961 against Australia. For the 1961 season Cooke had moved north to Auckland, joining the Papakura club who played as part of Eastern United in the Auckland Rugby League competition. He also represented Auckland, who defended the Northern Union Cup against Canterbury and the West Coast that year. At the end of the season Cooke toured Great Britain and France with the Kiwis.

Cooke joined City-Newton in 1964 and went on to score 205 points for them that season. After several years of only representing Auckland Cooke was again selected for New Zealand that year, playing his final test against France.

Cooke later moved to Australia and played for Queensland Firsts four times in 1967.

REG COOKE

Reg was a New Zealand International in 1959/65, a Queensland State Representative in 1966 and New South Wales Group Representative 1968. He is one of the outstanding post war Centres in Rugby League, with this record:

1959 at 18 years of age: represented New Zealand against France in New Zealand.

1960: Represented New Zealand in World Cup overseas.

1961: Represented New Zealand against France and England overseas; also against Australia in New Zealand.

1962: Represented New Zealand against England in New Zealand.

1963: Represented New Zealand against South Africa in New Zealand.

1964: Represented New Zealand against France in New Zealand.

1966: Transferred to Queensland.

1967: Represented Queensland against New Zealand in New Zealand.

1967: Represented Queensland against New South Wales.

1968: Transferred to New South Wales Country. Represented GP 8/9. Unavailable for other Representative games.

He now captains Queanbeyan Kangaroos.

PUBLISHERS:

NEW SOUTH WALES RUGBY FOOTBALL LEAGUE, 165 Phillip Street, Sydney. 28 8565.
