= Gary Phillips (rugby league) =

NZ international rugby league footballer

Personal information
- Full name: Gary Raymond Phillips
- Born: New Zealand

Playing information
- Position: Fullback
Club
Years	Team	Pld	T	G	FG	P
	Ellerslie
Representative
Years	Team	Pld	T	G	FG	P
	Auckland
1959–63	New Zealand	8	0	1	1	3

Gary Phillips is a New Zealand former rugby league footballer who played in the 1950s and 1960s. He represented New Zealand in the 1960 World Cup.

== Playing career ==
Phillips played for Ellerslie in the Auckland Rugby League competition and represented Auckland. In 1957 he toured Australia with the Auckland junior team.

He was first selected for the New Zealand national rugby league team in 1959 for the tour of Australia. Phillips went on to play in eight tests for New Zealand, including at the 1960 World Cup. Phillips, along with Ron Ackland and Neville Denton, withdrew from the 1961 tour of Great Britain due to a dispute over allowances.

Phillips was also part of the Auckland sides that defeated Australia in 1961 and Great Britain in 1962. He was named the New Zealand Rugby League player of the year that year.

In 1966 Phillips served as an Auckland selector.
