= Neville Denton =

NZ international rugby league footballer & coach

Personal information
- Full name: Neville Leon Denton
- Born: 22 July 1934 Auckland, New Zealand
- Died: 27 March 2015 (aged 80) Paparimu, Auckland, New Zealand

Playing information
- Position: Wing
Club
Years	Team	Pld	T	G	FG	P
	Northern Districts (ARL)
	Marits (ARL)
	Total	0	0	0	0	0
Representative
Years	Team	Pld	T	G	FG	P
	Auckland
1954–63	New Zealand	13	5	1	0	17

Coaching information
Club
Years	Team	Gms	W	D	L	W%
1965–66	Marist (ARL)
	Mangere East
	Total	0	0	0	0
Representative
Years	Team	Gms	W	D	L	W%
1971–73	Auckland

Neville Leon Denton (22 July 1934 – 27 March 2015) was a New Zealand rugby league player who represented New Zealand in the 1954 and 1960 World Cup.

== Playing career ==
Denton, an Auckland representative, played in 13 test matches for the New Zealand national rugby league team between 1954 and 1963. During this time Denton attended the 1954, 1957 and 1960 World Cups. However he did not play a match in the 1957 World Cup. Denton was also part of the Auckland teams that defeated France 15–8 in 1960, Australia 13–8 in 1961 and Great Britain 46–13 in 1962.

Denton, along with Ron Ackland and Gary Phillips, withdrew from the 1961 tour of Great Britain due to a dispute over allowances. He played for the "Northern Districts" team during the Auckland Rugby League's "district era". The team was a combination of Northcote Tigers and North Shore Albions. He also played for Marist.

== Coaching career ==
Denton coached Marist in 1965 and 1966 and also coached Mangere East. Denton later served as the selector-coach of Auckland between 1971 and 1973.

== Later years ==
Denton died on 27 March 2015, aged 80, at his Paparimu, Auckland residence.
