= 1960 Rugby League World Cup =

3rd Rugby League World Cup tournament

1960 World Cup
- Number of teams: 4
- Host country: United Kingdom
- Winner: Great Britain (2nd title)
- Matches played: 6
- Attendance: 110,200 (18,367 per match)
- Points scored: 154 (25.67 per match)
- Top scorer: (Australia) Brian Carlson (22)
- Top try scorer: (Australia) Brian Carlson (4)

The 1960 Rugby League World Cup was the third World Cup for men’s national teams and was held between 24 September and 8 October and hosted in England. The same format used in 1957 was used, with Great Britain winning their second World Cup after finishing top of the group.

The 1960 World Cup raised problems which had not really affected the previous tournaments. Live television of complete games was held responsible for lower than anticipated attendances, the largest crowd being the 32,773 which gathered at Odsal for the deciding match between Australia and Great Britain.

For Australia the World Cup matches formed part of their Kangaroo Tour of Great Britain and France.

== Venues ==
Bradford	Wigan
Odsal	Central Park
Capacity: 60,000	Capacity: 48,000
Swinton	Leeds
Station Road	Headingley
Capacity: 40,000	Capacity: 40,000

== Results ==
Team	Pld	W	D	L	PF	PA	PD	Pts	Result
Great Britain	3	3	0	0	66	18	+48	6	World Cup Winners
Australia	3	2	0	1	37	37	0	4	
New Zealand	3	1	0	2	32	44	−12	2	
France	3	0	0	3	19	55	−36	0	

24 September

Great Britain	23 – 8	New Zealand

Odsal, Bradford
Attendance: 20,577

24 September

Australia	13 – 12	France

Central Park, Wigan
Attendance: 20,278

1 October

Australia	21 – 15	New Zealand

Headingley, Leeds
Attendance: 10,773
Referee: Eric Clay

1 October

Great Britain	33 – 7	France

Station Road, Swinton
Attendance: 22,923
Referee: Edouard Martung

8 October

France	0 – 9	New Zealand
		Tries: Reid; Goals: Eastlake (3)

Central Park, Wigan
Attendance: 2,876

8 October

Great Britain	10 – 3	Australia
Tries: Boston, Sullivan; Goals: Rhodes (2)		Tries: Carlson

Odsal, Bradford
Attendance: 33,023
Referee: Edouard Martung

== Try scorers ==
4

- (Australia) Brian Carlson

3

- (United Kingdom) Alan Davies

2

- (Australia) Reg Gasnier
- (France) Raymond Gruppi
- (United Kingdom) Frank Myler
- (United Kingdom) Austin Rhodes
- (United Kingdom) Mick Sullivan
- (New Zealand) Tom Hadfield

1

- (Australia) Noel Kelly
- (Australia) Johnny Raper
- (Australia) Harry Wells
- (France) Jacques Dubon
- (United Kingdom) Eric Ashton
- (United Kingdom) Billy Boston
- (United Kingdom) Brian McTigue
- (United Kingdom) Alex Murphy
- (United Kingdom) Jack Wilkinson
- (New Zealand) Mel Cooke
- (New Zealand) George Menzies
- (New Zealand) Tom Reid
- (New Zealand) George Turner

== Tour games ==
After the tournament, Australia and New Zealand arranged short two-game tours against English clubs. Winners Great Britain also played a match against a Rest of the World team, which they won 33–27.

Australia

Date	Opponents	Score	Venue	Attendance
12 October	St Helens	Lost 12–15	St Helens	12,250
16 October	South West France	Won 37–12	Toulouse	5,304

New Zealand

Date	Opponents	Score	Venue	Attendance
12 October	Halifax	Won 18–12	Halifax	
13 October	France	Lost 11–22	Paris	4,500

== Sources ==
- 1960 World Cup at rlhalloffame.org.uk
- 1960 World Cup at rlwc2008.com
- 1960 World Cup at rugbyleagueproject.com
- 1960 World Cup data at hunterlink.net.au
- 1960 World Cup at 188-rugby-league.co.uk
