= Glenora Bears =

NZ rugby league club, based in Glen Eden, North Island, New Zealand

Club information
- Full name: Glenora Bears Rugby League Football Club
- Nickname: Ora
- Colours: Blue/White
- Founded: 1931; 95 years ago

Current details
- Ground: Harold Moody Park
- Coach: Tony Benson
- Captain: Phil Kingi
- Competition: Auckland Rugby League

Records
- Premierships: 1962, 1997, 1998, 1999, 2017
- Minor premierships: 1982, 1988, 1998, 1999
- Roope Rooster: 1960, 1978, 1999, 2017
- Stormont Shield: 1960, 1962, 2011
- Sharman Cup: 1971, 1985, 1996

The Glenora Bears are a rugby league football club based in Glen Eden, New Zealand who compete in Auckland Rugby League's Fox Memorial competition.

== History ==
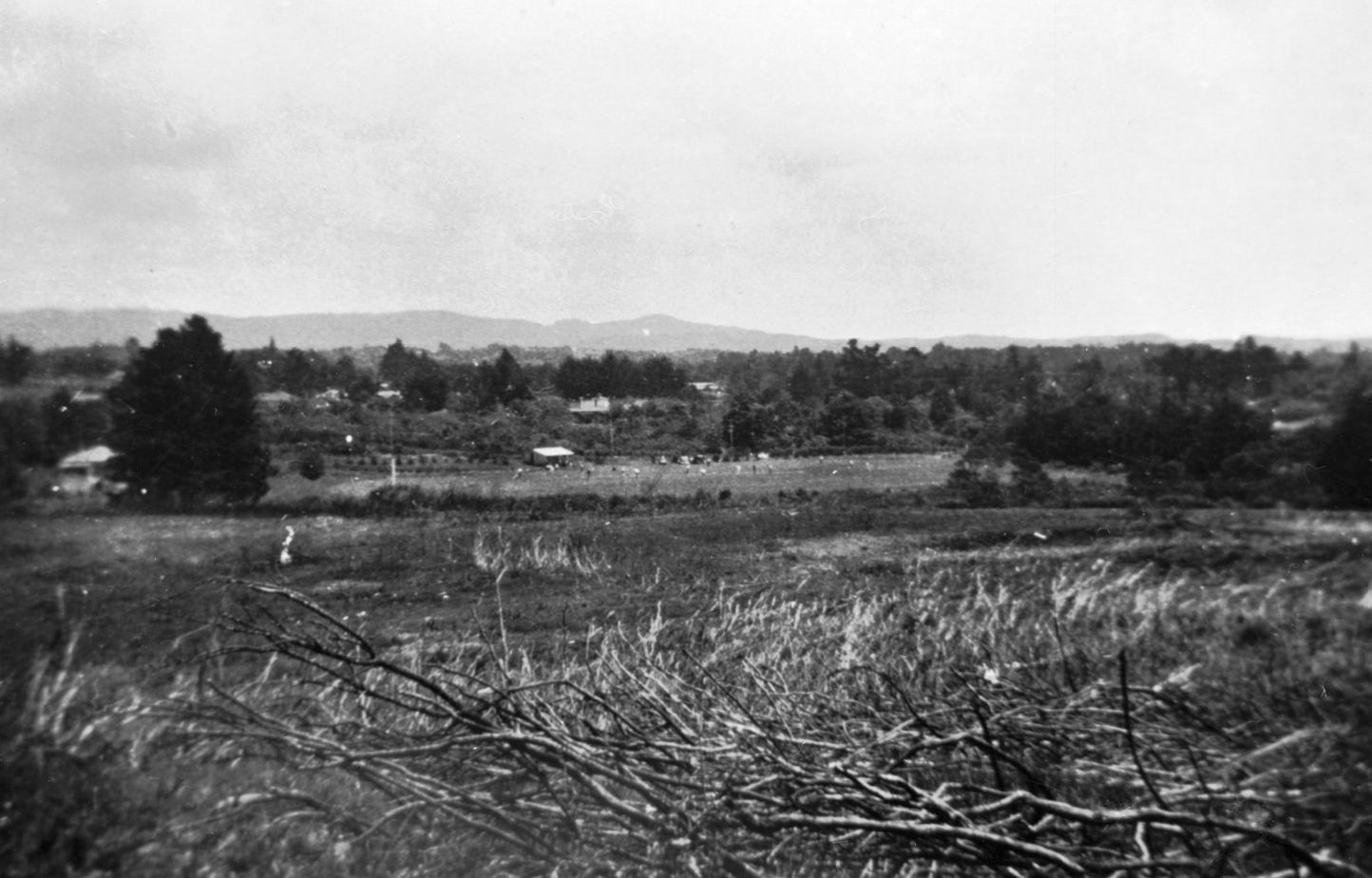
Glen Eden Recreation Reserve from Evans Road in 1933. The area seen is the present day Duck Park section of the park.

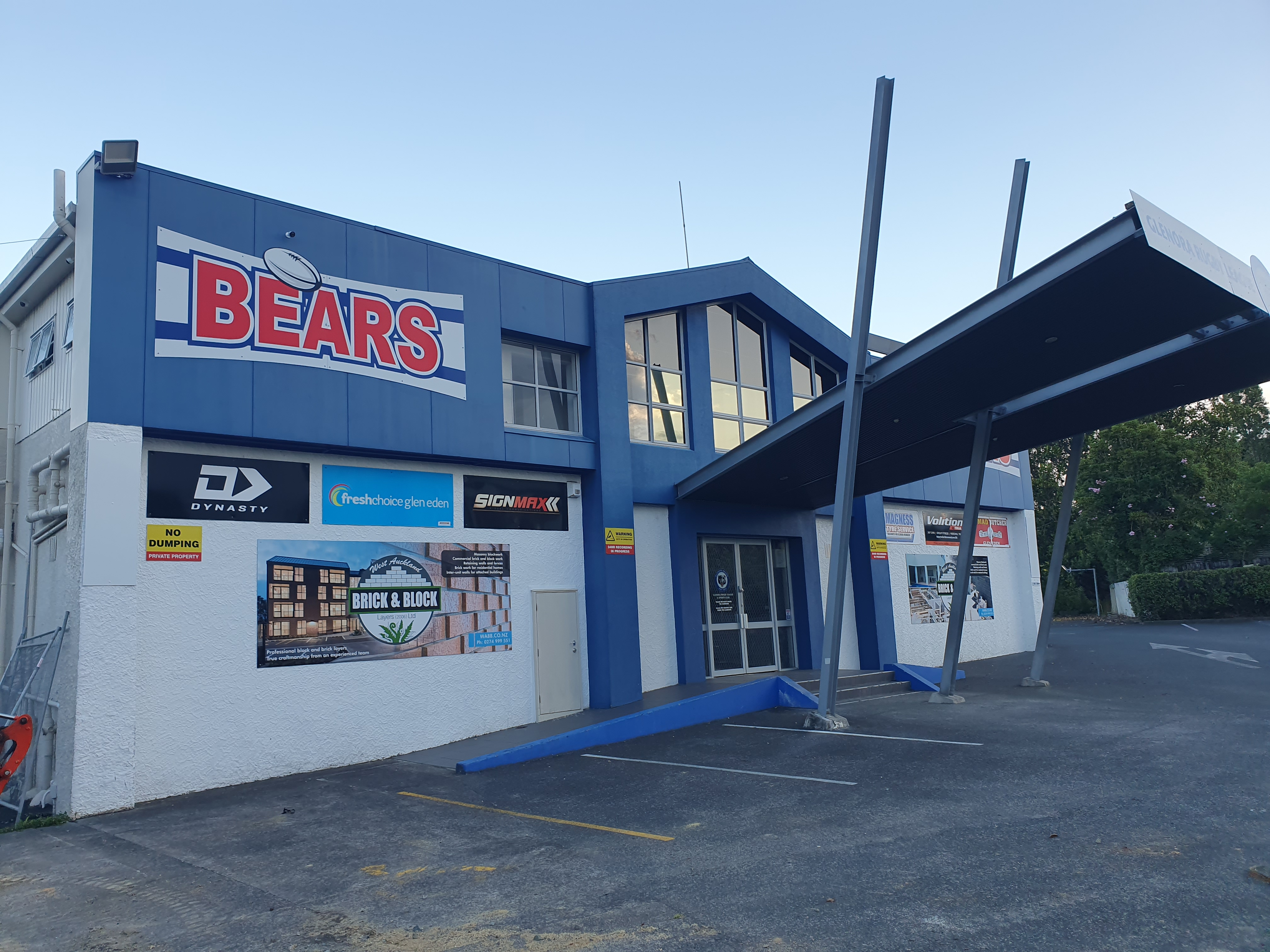
The Glenora Bears club rooms in Harold Moody Park, Glen Eden

The club was established in 1931 when the Auckland Rugby League Junior Management Committee accepted their application for membership in June of that year whereby they would enter a team in the Third Grade intermediate competition. Clubs had previously existed in the Glen Eden and New Lynn areas and played under those names and in 1929 the two clubs amalgamated to form Glen Lynn. Glenora lost their first ever match versus Akarana 0–16 at Glen Eden. The club is based at Harold Moody Park in Glen Eden.

Their first ever grade win came in 1935 when they won the Hospital Cup for winning the 4th grade competition. In 1962, Glenora tied with Eastern United in the Fox Memorial Grand Final. In 1975, the club controversially signed All Black Joe Karam, then one of the All Black's major players.

The first time the club won the Fox Memorial outright was in 1997. Glenora repeated this in 1998 and 1999. Between 2000 and 2005 they competed in the national Bartercard Cup.

They won the Fox Memorial in 2017, 18 years since their last title. In 2022 Glenora lost the final to Point Chevalier Pirates 14–12.

== Notable players ==
The following is a list of Glenora Bears players who went on to represent New Zealand and the years in which they did so.

- Bill Sorensen (1951-52-53-54-55-56-57-60) Hall of Fame Legend of League
- Tom Reid (1960–61)
- Maunga Emery (1961-62-63-64-65-66)
- Roger Tait (1965-66-67-68)
- Bob Mincham (1966–68)
- Henry Tatana (1967-68-71)
- Eric Carson (1968–70)
- Wayne Redmond (1970) (father David Walker Redmond, Kiwi 1948–49)
- Don Mann (1971-72-74) (son Duane Mann, Kiwi 1989–94)
- Dennis Williams (1971-72-74-75-77-78-80-81) Kiwi Captain 1975 & Hall of Fame Legend of League
- Joe Karam (1975-76-77)
- Dane O'Hara (1977-78-79-80-81-82-84-85-86) Kiwi Captain 1980
- Glenn Taylor (1978)
- Dean Lonergan (1986-87-90-91)
- Duane Mann (1989-90-91-92-93-94) Kiwi Captain 1994
- Kelly Shelford (1989-90-91)
- Phil Bancroft (1989)
- Mike Patton (1990–91)
- Jarrod McCracken (1991-93-94-95-98-99) Kiwi Captain 1999
- Brian Jellick (1999–2000)
- Henry Perenara (2000)
- Sione Faumuina (2003–04)
- Wairangi Koopu (2004–05)
- Shontayne Hape (2004–05-06)
- Fuifui Moimoi (2004-)
- Epalahame Lauaki (2006 & 2017)
- Josh Aloiai (2016)
- Hafu Vake (2016)
- Nathaniel Peteru (2010–11)
- Chris Satae (2015)

== Bartercard Cup ==
The Bears competed in the Bartercard Cup between 2000 and 2005.

The Bears were probably the least successful of all the Auckland stand alone clubs in the competition, only making the play-offs in 2000 and never really posing a serious threat to the championship in their six-year Bartercard Cup history.

They were the only Waitakere City team in the competition and were replaced by the Waitakere Rangers, a franchise that represented all five Waitakere clubs.

== Glenora Bears Senior Team Records (1931-33, 1982, 1988-90, 1992-94, 2000-05 & 2020-2025) ==
The season record for the most senior men's team in the club including lower grade teams.

| Season | Grade | Name | Pld | W | D | L | PF | PA | PD | Pts | Position (Teams) |
|---|---|---|---|---|---|---|---|---|---|---|---|
| 1931 | 3rd Grade Intermediate | Glen Ora | 7 | 0 | 0 | 5 | 0 | 374 | 48 | 0 | 8th of 8 |
| 1932 | 3rd Grade Open | Glen Ora | 12 | 2 | 0 | 7 | 19 | 108 | -89 | 4 | 6th of 7 |
| 1933 | 3rd Grade Open | Glen Ora | 14 | 5 | 0 | 4 | 102 | 47 | 55 | 10 | 5th of 8 |
| 1982 | 1st Gr. (Fox Memorial) | Glenora Bears | 25 | 17 | 0 | 8 | 512 | 374 | 138% | 34 | Won Rukutai Shield |
| 1988 | 1st Gr. (Fox Memorial) | Glenora Bears | 14 | 11 | 0 | 3 | 379 | 194 | 195.4% | 22 | 1st of 8 |
| | Playoffs | Glenora Bears | 2 | 1 | 0 | 1 | 16 | 22 | - | - | Won SF, lost GF to Te Atatu 16–22 |
| 1989 | 1st Gr. (Fox Memorial) | Glenora Bears | 14 | 4 | 0 | 10 | 361 | 359 | 100.6% | 8 | 7th of 8 |
| 1990 | 1st Gr. (Fox Memorial) | Glenora Bears | 21 | 10 | 1 | 10 | 474 | 418 | 113.4% | 11 | 4th of 8 |
| | Playoffs | Glenora Bears | 1 | 0 | 0 | 1 | 18 | 37 | - | - | L 18-37 v Ōtāhuhu in minor SF |
| 1992 | 1st Gr. (Fox Memorial) | Glenora Bears | 18 | 2 | 1 | 15 | 215 | 416 | 51.7% | 5 | 9th of 10 |
| 1993 | 1st Gr. (Fox Memorial) | Glenora Bears | 18 | 4 | 0 | 14 | 378 | 437 | 86.5% | 11 | 4th of 8 |
| 1994 | 1st Gr. (Fox Memorial) | Glenora Bears | 22 | 5 | 1 | 16 | 431 | 602 | 71.6% | 11 | 12th of 12 |
| 2000 | Bartercard Cup | Glenora Bears | 22 | 13 | 0 | 9 | 608 | 519 | 117.1% | 26 | 5th of 12 |
| | Playoffs | Glenora Bears | 1 | 0 | 0 | 1 | ? | ? | - | - | lost elimination play off |
| 2001 | Bartercard Cup | Glenora Bears | 22 | 9 | 0 | 13 | 630 | 675 | 93.3% | 18 | 9th of 12 |
| 2002 | Bartercard Cup | Glenora Bears | 16 | 5 | 2 | 9 | 394 | 515 | 76.5% | 12 | 8th of 12 |
| 2003 | Bartercard Cup | Glenora Bears | 16 | 5 | 1 | 10 | 458 | 514 | 89.1% | 11 | 8th of 12 |
| 2004 | Bartercard Cup | Glenora Bears | 16 | 3 | 3 | 10 | 341 | 530 | 64.3% | 9 | 11th of 12 |
| 2005 | Bartercard Cup | Glenora Bears | 16 | 4 | 1 | 11 | 388 | 486 | 79.8% | 9 | 10th of 12 |
| 2020 | Fox Premiership | Glenora Bears | 8 | 3 | 0 | 5 | 172 | 164 | 104.9% | 9 | 10th of 12, season cancelled after round 8 (Covid) |
| 2021 | Fox Prem Phase 1 | Glenora Bears | 11 | 10 | 0 | 1 | 312 | 212 | 147.2% | 20 | 2nd of 12 |
| | Fox Prem Phase 2 | Glenora Bears | 7 | 5 | 0 | 2 | 174 | 144 | 120.8% | 10 | 2nd of 8, season cancelled prior to playoffs (Covid) |
| 2022 | Fox Memorial | Glenora Bears | 9 | 8 | 0 | 1 | 472 | 76 | 621.1% | 16 | 1st of 9 in sect. 1 |
| | Playoffs | Glenora Bears | 3 | 2 | 0 | 1 | 66 | 42 | - | - | W v Te Atatu 26–12 in QF, W v Otahuhu 26–18 in SF, L v Pt Chev 14–12 in GF. |
| 2023 | Fox Qualifying | Glenora Bears | 3 | 1 | 0 | 2 | 66 | 79 | 83.54% | 2 | 3rd of 4 in Pool C |
| | Fox Memorial | Glenora Bears | 11 | 4 | 0 | 7 | 176 | 256 | 68.75% | 8 | 9th of 12 |
| 2024 | Fox Qualifiers | Glenora Bears | 3 | 1 | 0 | 2 | 48 | 132 | -84 | 2 | 3rd of 4 in Pool A |
| | Fox Memorial | Glenora Bears | 11 | 1 | 0 | 10 | 176 | 496 | -320 | 2 | 11th of 12 |
| 2025 | Fox Qualifiers | Glenora Bears | 3 | 0 | 0 | 3 | 38 | 178 | -140 | 0 | 4th of 4 in Pool B |
| | Sharman Cup | Glenora Bears | 11 | 3 | 0 | 8 | 160 | 546 | -386 | 6 | 7th of 10 |
| 1931-33, 1982, 1988–90, 1992–94, 2000–2005, +2020-25 | TOTAL | | 494 | 218 | 15 | 251 | 11404 | 11359 | +45 | 445 | |
