= Jack Fagan =

New Zealand international rugby league footballer and coach

Personal information
- Full name: John Edward Fagan
- Born: 21 June 1933 New Zealand
- Died: 30 November 2015 (aged 82) Takapuna, New Zealand

Playing information
- Position: Fullback
Club
Years	Team	Pld	T	G	FG	P
	Ponsonby
Representative
Years	Team	Pld	T	G	FG	P
	Auckland
1961–65	New Zealand	17	1	47	0	97

Coaching information
Club
Years	Team	Gms	W	D	L	W%
	Mount Albert Lions
1968	University
	Total	0	0	0	0

John Edward "Jack" Fagan (21 June 1933 – 30 November 2015) was a New Zealand rugby league player who represented New Zealand.

== Playing career ==
Fagan played for Ponsonby and represented Auckland. He was part of the Auckland side that defeated France in 1960.

A goal-kicking fullback, he was first selected for New Zealand in 1961, and went on to play 53 games for the Kiwis, including in 17 tests, until 1965. On retirement, he was New Zealand's second highest test scorer after Des White.

He retired in 1966, after breaking his arm.

== Later years ==
Fagan coached the Mount Albert Lions and, in 1968, the University of Auckland's rugby league team.

He also served on the New Zealand Rugby League (NZRL) judiciary, the New Zealand Kiwis Association and the NZRL Museum board.

Fagan was made a life member of the NZRL at the 2015 annual meeting. He died in Takapuna on 30 November 2015.
