= Thacker Shield =

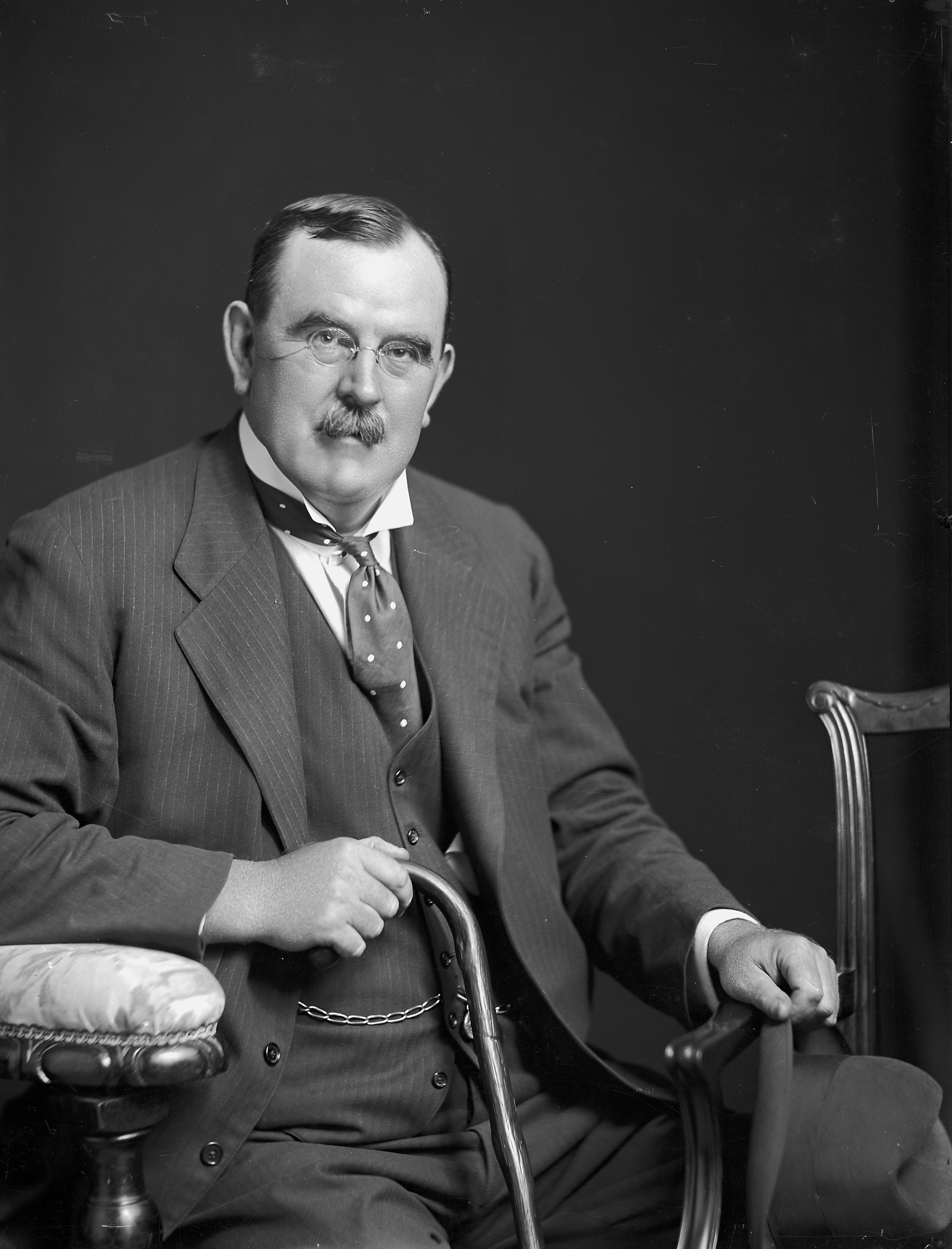
Dr Thacker in 1918

The Thacker Shield is a rugby league football trophy awarded on an annual basis to the winner of a match between the champion clubs of the Canterbury Rugby League and West Coast Rugby League.

== History ==
The shield was donated by Dr Henry Thacker in 1913 after setting up the Canterbury Rugby Football League in 1912. The shield was originally competed for on a national basis by the various provincial club champions. Sydenham defeated North Shore to win the first title 13-8 on 6 September 1913. Ponsonby United won the title in 1918. Ponsonby held the trophy until 1921 when it accepted a challenge from Auckland's City club, losing the trophy to City. Sydenham had also challenged for the trophy but had been told that there was no suitable date. The Canterbury Rugby League, and their President Henry Thacker, challenged this decision and the New Zealand Rugby League stepped in, returning the trophy to Canterbury. The rules were subsequently amended to make the shield only contestable between South Island clubs. Runanga became the first West Coast Rugby League team to win the trophy, when they defeated Addington 16-6 at Monica Park in 1931.

== See also ==
- NRL State Championship
