= Bill Snowden (rugby league) =

New Zealand international rugby league footballer

Personal information
- Full name: William Leonard Snowden
- Born: 2 January 1935 Auckland, New Zealand
- Died: 4 June 2016 (aged 81) Sydney, New South Wales, Australia

Playing information
- Position: Halfback
Club
Years	Team	Pld	T	G	FG	P
1958–66	Ponsonby
Representative
Years	Team	Pld	T	G	FG	P
	Auckland
	North Island
	New Zealand Māori
1959–65	New Zealand	19

William Leonard Snowden (2 January 1935 – 4 June 2016) was a New Zealand rugby league footballer who represented New Zealand.

== Early life ==
Snowden was born in Auckland on 2 January 1935.

== Playing career ==
Snowden played halfback for the Ponsonby club and represented Auckland, New Zealand Māori and the North Island.

He made his debut for the New Zealand national rugby league team during the 1959 tour of Australia, becoming Kiwi #391, however he did not make his test match debut until 1961, against Australia at Carlaw Park.

Snowden became the New Zealand vice-captain in 1962 before becoming captain in 1965. He retired having played 57 games for New Zealand, including 18 test matches.

== Later years ==
In 1967 he coached the new University of Auckland club in the sixth grade.

Snowden died in Sydney on 4 June 2016.
