= West Coast Rugby League =

New Zealand local sporting body

Club information
- Founded: 1915

Current details
- Ground: Wingham Park

West Coast Rugby League (WCRL) is the local sporting body responsible for the administration of rugby league in the West Coast region of New Zealand, centred around Greymouth. The WCRL own Wingham Park and are represented by the West Coast rugby league team.

== History ==
The West Coast Rugby League was formed on 3 June 1915, after Canterbury and West Coast played each other earlier in the day.

On the 14 June Kohinoor left the West Coast Rugby Union and two days later, on the 16th, they started the senior club competition with Blackball and Hokitika. The Grey club was added on 6 July.

The West Coast Rugby League went into recess at the end of the year, until being revived in 1919 by J.D. Wingham. Blackball, Kohinoor and Runanga competed in the 1919 competition.

Since then rugby league has traditionally been the most successful team sport in the West Coast. However, since the 1990s the West Coast has usually participated in Second Division or South Island competitions and in particular the West Coast missed out on having a team in either the Lion Red Cup or Bartercard Cup, the two main New Zealand Rugby League competitions of the 1990s and 2000s.

In 2018, the region's premier club competition was cancelled due to a lack of player numbers. The region's sole remaining senior rugby league team, the Greymouth Greyhounds, began competing in the Canterbury Rugby League competition in 2023.

== Grand Final Winners ==
These are the Grand Final winners from 1979 to 2012.

Season	Winner
2012	Runanga
2011	Runanga
2010	Runanga
2009	Suburbs
2008	Suburbs
2007	Suburbs
2006	Runanga
2005	Runanga
2004	Cobden-Kohinoor
2003	Suburbs
2002	Suburbs
2001	Suburbs
2000	Waro-Rakau
1999	Cobden-Kohinoor
1998	Marist
1997	Cobden-Kohinoor
1996	Waro-Rakau
1995	Cobden-Kohinoor
1994	Waro-Rakau
1993	Waro-Rakau
1992	Suburbs
1991	Suburbs
1990	Marist
1989	Cobden-Kohinoor
1988	Marist
1987	Cobden-Kohinoor
1986	Runanga
1985	Runanga
1984	Runanga
1983	Runanga
1982	Runanga
1981	Runanga
1980	Runanga
1979	Runanga

== Notable juniors competed in the NRL ==
Cobden-Kohinoor

- Slade Griffin (Melbourne Storm)

Marist

- Brent Stuart (Western Suburbs Magpies and Canberra Raiders)

Waro-Rakau

- Quentin Pongia (Canberra Raiders)

Suburbs

- Griffin Neame (North Queensland Cowboys)
