= 1958 Great Britain Lions tour =

- Manager: B. Manson & Tom Mitchell
- Coach(es): Jim Brough
- Tour captain(s): Alan Prescott
- Top point scorer(s): Eric Fraser (238)
- Top try scorer(s): Mick Sullivan (38)
- Top test point scorer(s): Eric Fraser (44)
- Top test try scorer(s): Mick Sullivan (8)
Summary
P	W	D	L
Total
30	27	1	2
Test match
5	3	0	2
Opponent
P	W	D	L
Australia
3	2	0	1
New Zealand
2	1	0	1

Tour chronology
- Previous tour: 1954
- Next tour: 1962

The 1958 Great Britain Lions tour was the Great Britain national rugby league team's 11th tour of Australia and New Zealand and took place from May to November 1958. The Lions played 26 games on tour including the three test Ashes series against Australia and two tests against New Zealand.

The Great Britain squad was coached by Jim Brough. The team captain was Alan Prescott from St Helens while Phil Jackson from Barrow was the tour vice-captain. The team managers were Mr B. Manson and Tom Mitchell.

The tour saw a record AU£78,417 in gate receipts with the Lions taking home a profit in excess of £40,000.

== Touring squad ==
During the tour, players used numbers 1–26 in positional order, with full-backs as numbers 1 and 2. The Rugby League News published a photo of the touring squad and pen pictures of some players in two groups: one, and two.

Player	Pos.	Age (Note: Age as given in the Rugby League News for the first match against Sydney)	Weight	Club	Tests on Tour	Games in Aus	Games in NZ (Note: Other than the Test Matches, team lists for the tour matches in New Zealand not available to the author at the time of page creation.)	Tries in Aus	Goals in Aus	FG	Points in Aus	Total Points
Alvin Ackerley	Hooker	30	14 st. 0 lb. (89 kg)	Halifax	1	12		1	0	0	3
Harry Archer	Stand-off	23	13 st. 12 lb. (88 kg)	Workington	0	7		0	0	0	0
Eric Ashton	Centre	23	13 st. 12 lb. (88 kg)	Wigan	4	13		20	13	0	86	116
Dave Bolton	Fullback, Stand-off	21	11 st. 6 lb. (73 kg)	Wigan	2	8		6	0	0	18
Frank Carlton	Wing	22	11 st. 10 lb. (74 kg)	St Helens	1	6		16	0	0	48
Jim Challinor	Wing, Centre	23	13 st. 0 lb. (83 kg)	Warrington	2	9		7	0	0	21
Alan Davies	Centre, Stand-off	25	13 st. 8 lb. (86 kg)	Oldham	4	15		11	0	0	33
Brian Edgar	Prop, Second-row	22	14 st. 4 lb. (91 kg)	Workington	2	11		3	0	0	9
Eric Fraser	Fullback	27	13 st. 0 lb. (83 kg)	Warrington	5	13		5	82	0	179	238
Dennis Goodwin	Centre, Prop, Second-row	28	15 st. 0 lb. (95 kg)	Barrow	2	8		2	0	0	6
Tommy Harris	Hooker	30	13 st. 0 lb. (83 kg)	Hull	4	10		3	0	0	9
Dick Huddart	Second-row	21	14 st. 4 lb. (91 kg)	Whitehaven	4	17		15	0	0	45
Ken Jackson	Prop	29	14 st. 10 lb. (93 kg)	Oldham	0	6		0	0	0	0
Phil Jackson (vc)	Centre, Stand-off	25	14 st. 12 lb. (94 kg)	Barrow	3	9		4	0	0	12
Vince Karalius	Second-row, Loose forward	25	14 st. 6 lb. (92 kg)	St Helens	4	11		2	0	0	6
Mick Martyn	Second-row	22	14 st. 4 lb. (91 kg)	Leigh	1	12		15	0	0	45
Brian McTigue	Centre, Prop	27	14 st. 4 lb. (91 kg)	Wigan	4	12		3	11	0	31
Glyn Moses	Fullback	30	13 st. 0 lb. (83 kg)	St Helens	0	12		1	0	0	3
Alex Murphy	Scrum-half, Centre	19	11 st. 0 lb. (70 kg)	St Helens	4	15		15	3	0	51
Frank Pitchford	Scrum-half	24	11 st. 0 lb. (70 kg)	Oldham	1	8		7	0	0	21
Alan Prescott (c)	Centre, Wing, Loose forward	30	15 st. 10 lb. (100 kg)	St Helens	2	9		0	0	0	0
Ike Southward	Wing	23	12 st. 0 lb. (76 kg)	Workington	4	12		13	20	0	79	165
Mick Sullivan	Wing	24	11 st. 12 lb. (75 kg)	Wigan	5	12		20	0	0	60	114
Abe Terry	Prop	24	16 st. 0 lb. (102 kg)	St Helens	2	10		2	0	0	6
Johnny Whiteley	Second-row, Loose forward	27	14 st. 8 lb. (93 kg)	Hull	4	10		7	0	0	21
Bill Wookey	Wing	22	14 st. 0 lb. (89 kg)	Workington	0	7		6	0	0	18

== Australian leg ==
=== Test venues ===
The three Ashes series tests took place at the following venues. As per normal to maximise the gate, two tests were played at the 70,000 capacity Sydney Cricket Ground.

Sydney	Brisbane
Sydney Cricket Ground	Brisbane Exhibition Ground
Capacity: 70,000	Capacity: 35,000

18 May	Southern Districts	18–36	Great Britain	Wollongong Showground, Wollongong
		Result

21 May	Western Districts	24–24	Great Britain	Wade Park, Orange
		Scorers

24 May	Newcastle	16–35	Great Britain	Newcastle Sportsground, Newcastle
				Attendance: 21,126

28 May	Northern NSW	17–27	Great Britain	Scully Park, Tamworth
		Scorers

31 May	Sydney	15–20	Great Britain	Sydney Cricket Ground, Sydney
		Program		Attendance: 48,692; Referee: Darcy Lawler

4 June	Riverina	10–29	Great Britain	Leeton
				Attendance: 6,000

7 June	New South Wales	10–19	Great Britain	Sydney Cricket Ground, Sydney
		Program		Attendance: 52,963; Referee: Col Pearce

The final match before the first Test was often viewed by the home side as a chance to soften up the tourists and that was certainly the case in a violent clash which saw four players dismissed by referee Col Pearce – Vince Karalius (Great Britain); Greg Hawick, Rex Mossop and Peter Dimond (NSW).

== The Ashes ==
The three Ashes series tests drew an aggregate attendance of 171,060.

=== 1st Test ===
Saturday 14 June

Australia	25–8	Great Britain
Tries: Brian Carlson; Ross Kite; Rex Mossop; Kel O'Shea; Norm Provan; Goals: Gordon Clifford (5)	Database; Program	Tries: Dave Bolton; Ike Southward Goals: Ike Southward (1)

Sydney Cricket Ground, Sydney
Attendance: 68,777
Referee: Darcy Lawler (Australia)

Australia	Great Britain

FB	1	Gordon Clifford
WG	2	Ross Kite
CE	3	Harry Wells
CE	4	Brian Carlson
WG	5	Ian Moir
FE	6	Tony Brown
HB	7	Keith Holman
PR	13	Bill Marsh
HK	12	Ken Kearney
PR	11	Brian Davies (c)
SR	10	Rex Mossop
SR	9	Norm Provan
LF	8	Kel O'Shea
Coach:
(Australia) Norm Robinson

FB	9	Eric Fraser
WG	22	Ike Southward
CE	14	Phil Jackson
CE	7	Alan Davies
WG	23	Mick Sullivan
SO	4	Dave Bolton
SH	19	Alex Murphy
PR	21	Alan Prescott (c)
HK	11	Tommy Harris
PR	24	Abe Terry
SR	8	Brian Edgar
SR	16	Mick Martyn
LF	25	Johnny Whiteley
Coach:
(England) Jim Brough

After going through the tour undefeated before the test, the Lions ran into a hungry Australian side who led 10–0 after just 10 minutes and led 18–0 at halftime in front of 68,777 fans at the SCG.

16 June	Brisbane	29–34	Great Britain	Brisbane Exhibition Ground, Brisbane
				Referee: Jack Casey

21 June	Queensland	29–34	Great Britain	Brisbane Exhibition Ground, Brisbane
				Player of the Match: Brian Davies

22 June	Central Division	19–61	Great Britain	Browne Park, Rockhampton
		Result

26 June	Wide Bay	25–50	Great Britain	Bundaberg

28 June	Far North Queensland	8–78	Great Britain	Cairns

28 June	North Queensland	17–78	Great Britain	Townsville

Lions test fullback Eric Fraser kicked 15 goals from 18 attempts in the match. Dick Huddart crossed for 4 tries while Eric Ashton and Mick Martyn each scored 3 tries.

=== 2nd Test ===
Saturday 5 July

Australia	18–25	Great Britain
Tries: Brian Carlson; Peter Dimond; Keith Holman; Bill Marsh; Goals: Gordon Clifford (3)	Database; Team	Tries: Ike Southward (2); Jim Challinor; Alex Murphy; Mick Sullivan; Goals: Eric Fraser (5)

Brisbane Exhibition Ground, Brisbane
Attendance: 33,563
Referee: Darcy Lawler (Australia)
Player of the Match: Alex Murphy

Australia	Great Britain

FB	1	Gordon Clifford
WG	2	Peter Dimond
CE	3	Brian Carlson
CE	4	Greg Hawick
WG	5	Ross Kite
FE	6	Tony Brown
HB	7	Keith Holman
PR	13	Bill Marsh
HK	12	Ken Kearney
PR	11	Brian Davies (c)
SR	10	Rex Mossop
SR	9	Norm Provan
LF	8	Kel O'Shea
Coach:
(Australia) Norm Robinson

FB	9	Eric Fraser
WG	22	Ike Southward
CE	3	Eric Ashton
CE	6	Jim Challinor
WG	23	Mick Sullivan
SO	4	Dave Bolton
SH	19	Alex Murphy
PR	17	Brian McTigue
HK	11	Tommy Harris
PR	21	Alan Prescott (c)
SR	25	Johnny Whiteley
SR	12	Dick Huddart
LF	15	Vince Karalius
Coach:
(England) Jim Brough

Inspired by captain Alan Prescott who played on until the end despite breaking his right arm in just the 3rd minute of the game, Great Britain leveled the series at 1–all with a 25–18 win over Australia in Brisbane. The injury ended Prescott's tour as a player. At half time, Prescott was offered a pain killing injection but refused, telling team manager Tom Mitchell "I just can't got off, Tom. We would be two men short. We have got to win, so I had better help the boys". Great Britain also lost Dave Bolton with a broken collar bone after just 17 minutes.

With Vince Karalius and Brian McTigue providing the muscle and teenage scrum-half Alex Murphy providing the class, the Lions had the measure of Australia this day.

9 July	Toowoomba	19–36	Great Britain	Toowoomba Athletic Oval, Cairns
				Attendance: 7,500

13 July	NSW North Coast	15–56	Great Britain	Oakes Oval, Lismore
				Attendance: 5,541

=== 3rd Test ===
Former Australian captain Ken Kearney played his 31st and last test.

Saturday 19 July

Australia	17–40	Great Britain
Tries: Greg Hawick; Keith Holman; Norm Provan Goals: Gordon Clifford (4)	Database; Program; Scorers	Tries: Mick Sullivan (3); Alan Davies; Alex Murphy; Ike Southward; Abe Terry; Johnny Whiteley; Goals: Eric Fraser (8)

Sydney Cricket Ground, Sydney
Attendance: 68,720
Referee: Jack Casey (Australia)
Player of the Match: Alex Murphy

Australia	Great Britain

FB	1	Gordon Clifford
WG	2	Ian Moir
CE	3	Brian Carlson
CE	4	Harry Wells
WG	5	Peter Dimond
FE	6	Greg Hawick
HB	7	Keith Holman
PR	13	Bill Marsh
HK	12	Ken Kearney
PR	11	Brian Davies (c)
SR	10	Rex Mossop
SR	9	Norm Provan
LF	8	Kel O'Shea
Coach:
(Australia) Norm Robinson

FB	9	Eric Fraser
WG	22	Ike Southward
CE	3	Eric Ashton
CE	6	Alan Davies
WG	23	Mick Sullivan
SO	4	Phil Jackson (c)
SH	19	Alex Murphy
PR	17	Abe Terry
HK	11	Tommy Harris
PR	24	Brian McTigue
SR	25	Johnny Whiteley
SR	12	Dick Huddart
LF	15	Vince Karalius
Coach:
(England) Jim Brough

Great Britain wrapped up The Ashes with a comprehensive 40–17 win over Australia in front of another 68,000+ crowd at the Sydney Cricket Ground. As he had done in the second test in Brisbane, 19 year old St Helens scrum-half Alex Murphy tormented the home side and was awarded the Man of the Match. Following the game, Lions players chaired injured captain Alan Prescott (carrying The Ashes cup) on a lap of honour of the ground.

The following matches took place after the New Zealand leg of the tour.

14 August	Representative Colts	v	Great Britain	Sydney Cricket Ground, Sydney
		Program

In this game against the NSWRFL's Representative Colts (U/21), future Australian captain Reg Gasnier played his first game against Great Britain.

17 August	Coalfields	v	Great Britain	Maitland Showground, Maitland

23 August	Western Australia	v	Great Britain	Claremont Showground, Perth

== New Zealand ==
=== 1st Test ===
Saturday 26 July

New Zealand	15–10	Great Britain
Tries: Rex Percy (2); Tom Hadfield; Goals: Cyril Eastlake (3)		Tries: Phil Jackson; Mick Sullivan; Goals: Eric Fraser (2)

Carlaw Park, Auckland
Attendance: 25,000
Referee: Vic Belsham (New Zealand)

New Zealand	Great Britain

FB	1	Cyril Eastlake
WG	2	Tom Hadfield
CE	3	Reese Griffiths
CE	4	George Turner
WG	5	Neville Denton
FE	6	George Menzies
HB	7	Keith Roberts
PR	13	Joe Rātima
HK	12	Jock Butterfield
PR	11	Henry Maxwell
SR	10	Cliff Johnson (c)
SR	9	Trevor Kilkelly
LF	8	Rex Percy
Coach:
(New Zealand) Travers Hardwick

FB	9	Eric Fraser
WG	5	Frank Carlton
CE	3	Eric Ashton
CE	6	Alan Davies
WG	23	Mick Sullivan
SO	4	Phil Jackson (c)
SH	20	Frank Pitchford
PR	17	Brian McTigue
HK	1	Alvin Ackerley
PR	10	Dennis Goodwin
SR	8	Dick Huddart
SR	25	Johnny Whiteley
LF	15	Vince Karalius
Coach:
(England) Jim Brough

Just a week after their Ashes triumph over Australia, Great Britain were brought back down to earth by a committed New Zealand side 15–10 at Carlaw Park in Auckland.

=== 2nd Test ===
Saturday 9 August

New Zealand	15–32	Great Britain
Tries: Tom Hadfield; Rex Percy; Keith Roberts; Goals: Cyril Eastlake (3)		Tries: Mick Sullivan (3); Eric Ashton (2); Alex Murphy; Goals: Eric Fraser (7)

Carlaw Park, Auckland
Attendance: 25,000
Referee: Vic Belsham (New Zealand)

New Zealand	Great Britain

FB	1	Cyril Eastlake
WG	2	Tom Hadfield
CE	3	Reese Griffiths
CE	4	George Turner
WG	5	Neville Denton
FE	6	George Menzies
HB	7	Keith Roberts
PR	13	Joe Rātima
HK	12	Jock Butterfield
PR	11	Henry Maxwell
SR	10	Trevor Kilkelly
SR	9	Cliff Johnson (c)
LF	8	Rex Percy
Coach:
(New Zealand) Travers Hardwick

FB	9	Eric Fraser
WG	5	Ike Southward
CE	3	Eric Ashton (c)
CE	6	Jim Challinor
WG	23	Mick Sullivan
SO	6	Alan Davies
SH	19	Alex Murphy
PR	8	Brian Edgar
HK	11	Tommy Harris
PR	17	Brian McTigue
SR	8	Dick Huddart
SR	10	Dennis Goodwin
LF	15	Vince Karalius
Coach:
(England) Jim Brough

With Alex Murphy returning from injury, Great Britain outclassed New Zealand 32–15 in front of 25,000 at Carlaw Park.
