= Alastair Brindle =

English rugby league footballer (1939–2025)

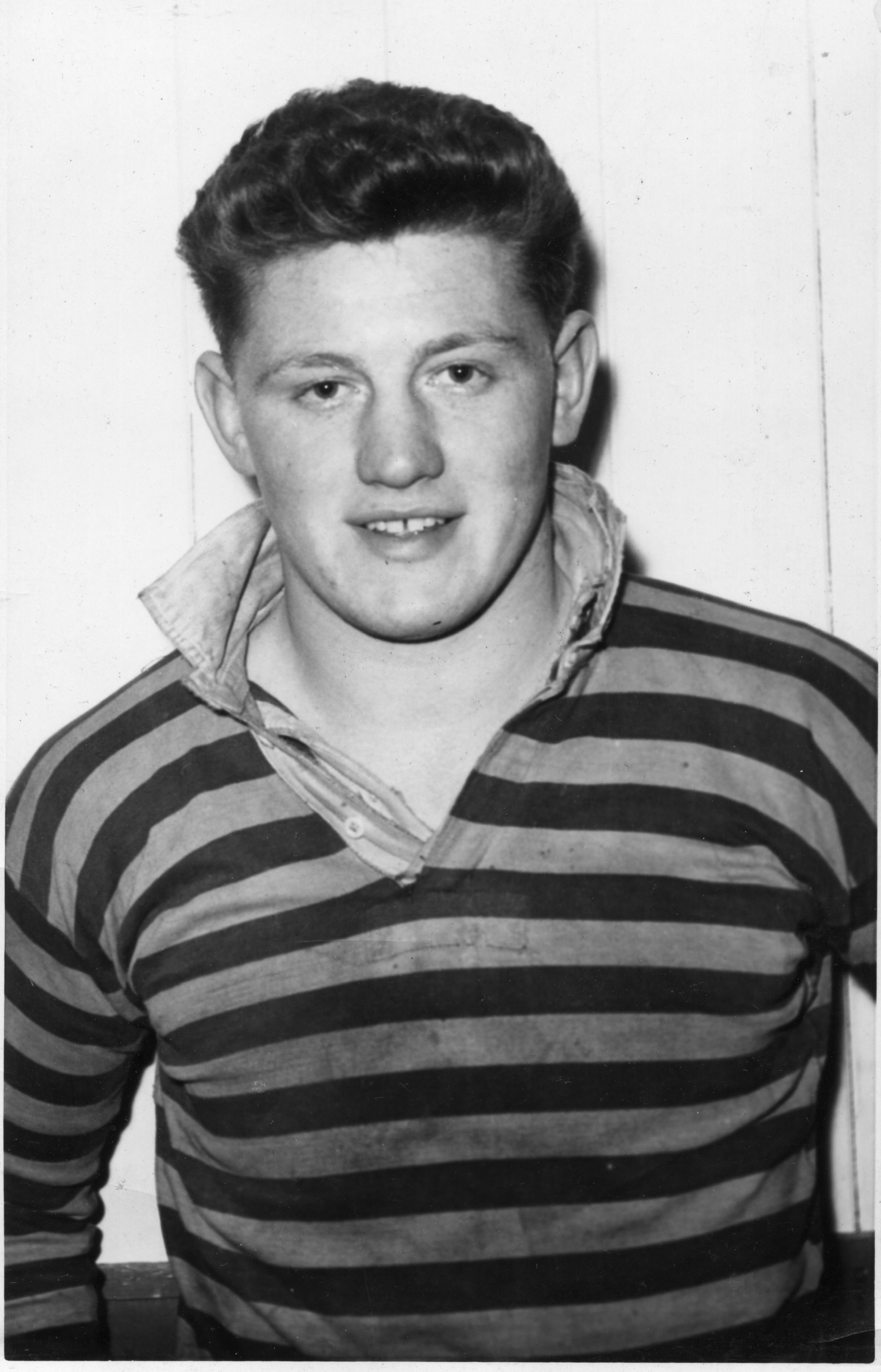

Personal information
- Born: 26 April 1939 Warrington, Cheshire, England
- Died: 15 September 2021 (aged 82)

Playing information
- Height: 5’11"
- Weight: 14 st (196 lb; 89 kg)
- Position: Prop
Club
| Years | Team | Pld | T | G | FG | P |
|---|---|---|---|---|---|---|
| 1957–69 | Warrington | 281 | 7 | 0 | 1 | 23 |

Alastair Brindle (26 April 1939 – 15 September 2021) was an English professional rugby league footballer who played in the 1950s and 1960s for his hometown team, Warrington.

== Background ==
Alastair Brindle was born in Warrington, Cheshire, England in 1939. He was a pupil at William Beaumont, Warrington and grew up on Wellfield St. Alastair was a Joiner by trade as well as a professional rugby league player.

== Playing career ==
Warrington-born Brindle signed for Warrington after appearing in the 1954 Lancashire Schoolboys team playing as a second-row. Brindle signed for Warrington from the local amateur side, Blackburne Arms for a signing-on fee of £100, with the agreement of an additional £300 after 10 first-team appearances.

Brindle made his debut for Warrington as an 18-year-old prop vs St Helens at Knowsley Road on 28 September 1957 in a 14-2 loss. Brindle’s next call up to the first team was 12 October 1957 in a 10-8 loss at Salford. Brindle was introduced back into the team 15 February 1958 and was included in each game for the rest of the 1958–59 Northern Rugby Football League season. Warrington recorded their biggest win that season with a 61-16 win against Rochdale at Wilderspool which was the final game of the season. Brindle made 10 appearances in his debut season for Warrington.

Brindle established himself in the team in the 1958/59 season and played 27 games. Brindle scored his first try for the club in his second season on 4 April 1959 helping his side beat Salford 27-21 at Wilderspool. He then went onto score his second try for the club the following week away at Barrow.

Brindle played as a prop for 12 seasons and at 20 years old, Brindle played in the 1959 Warrington side that defeated St Helens 5–4 in the Lancashire Cup Final at Wigan, which was in front of 39,237 fans. Warrington had won three away games at Workington, Leigh and Wigan beating Wigan in the Semi-Final.

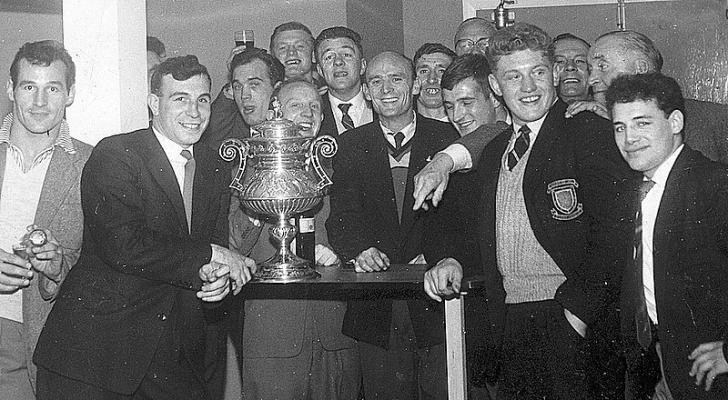
Warrington Celebrating 1959 Lancashire Cup win vs St Helens

On 19 September 1959, Brindle was part of the Warrington team that hosted Australia in their 1959-60 Kangaroo Tour at Wilderspool where they lost 30-24 in front of a crowd of 17,112. Tries that day were scored by Brian Bevan (2), Bobby Greenough (1), Jackie Edwards (1), John Manniex (1) and Ally Naughton (1).

The following season, Brindle was in the side that finished second in the league and reached the 1961 Championship Final at Odsal, only to lose out to Leeds 25-10 in front of 52,177.

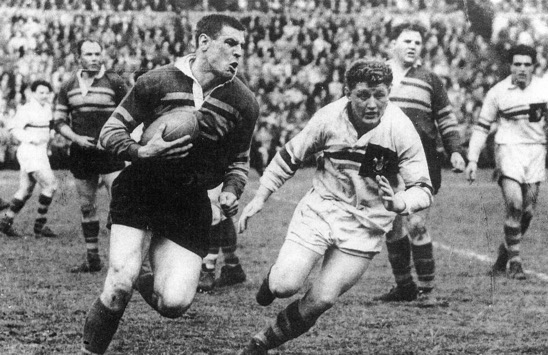
Alastair Brindle and Ken Thornett - Warrington vs Leeds, 1961 Championship Final at Odsal

In 1962/63 he played in the Warrington side that just missed out on reaching Wembley, losing to Wakefield in the semi-final 5-2 at Swinton. Warrington the following week played Wakefield away and beat them heavily 26-3.

Brindle was part of the Warrington side that beat Rochdale 16-5 to win the Lancashire Cup in 1965 which would be Brindle's second and final trophy with Warrington. The attendance was 21,360 at Knowsley Road.

On 25 August 1965, Brindle played against the touring New Zealand side in front of a crowd of 8,162 at Wilderspool, which Warrington lost 7-14. It was a closely contested game, described as a narrow defeat for the home side.

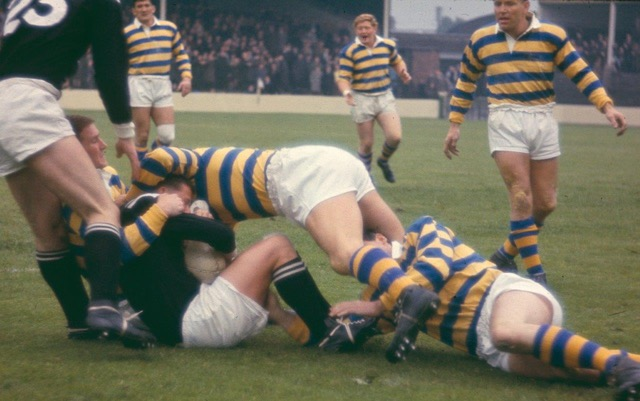
Warrington v New Zealand, 1965 at Wildserspool

Brindle's Testimonial game was played in 1968 at Wilderspool, which was an All Star Soccer game between Warrington and an All Star XI which consisted of Brian Bevan, Brian Glover, Jackie Edwards, Laurie Gilfedder and Alex Murphy.

Brindle played his very last game for Warrington on 12 April 1969 against Wigan at Wilderspool.

Brindle was inducted into the Warrington Hall of Fame in 2015.

== Honours ==
- 1959–60 Lancashire Cup
- 1965–66 Lancashire Cup
