= Jan Prinsloo =

South Africa international rugby union & league footballer

Personal information
- Full name: Johannes Albertus Prinsloo
- Born: 18 May 1935 or 28 January 1935; Pretoria, South Africa
- Died: 28 July 1966 (aged 31); Wellington, New Zealand

Playing information

Rugby union
- Position: Wing
Club
Years	Team	Pld	T	G	FG	P
≤1958–58	Western Province
Representative
Years	Team	Pld	T	G	FG	P
1958	South Africa

Rugby league
- Position: Wing
Club
Years	Team	Pld	T	G	FG	P
1958–61	St. Helens	89	70	0	0	210
1961–62/63	Wakefield Trinity	48	45	0	0	135
	Total	137	115	0	0	345
Representative
Years	Team	Pld	T	G	FG	P
≥1958–≤62/63	Rugby League XIII

Johannes "Jan" Albertus Prinsloo (1935 – 1966) was a South African rugby union and professional rugby league footballer who played in the 1950s and 1960s. He played representative level rugby union (RU) for South Africa, and at provincial level for Western Province as a wing, and representative rugby league (RL) for Rugby League XIII, and at club level for St Helens and Wakefield Trinity as a wing.

== Playing career ==
=== International honours ===
Jan Prinsloo won caps for South Africa (RU) while at Western Province against France on Saturday 26 July 1958, and against France on Saturday 16 August 1958, and represented Rugby League XIII (RL).

=== Club career ===
Jan Prinsloo was signed by St. Helens on 14 October 1958, he scored his first try for St. Helens as part of a two-try début against Rochdale Hornets on Saturday 8 November 1958. During the 1958–59 season Prinsloo scored hat-tricks against Salford and Blackpool Borough for a season total of 27-tries from 31 games. Prinsloo played a vital part in finishing dazzling moves for many a St. Helens victory including the sensational 1959 Championship Final win by 44 points to 22 over a great Hunslet side where Prinsloo exhibited a fabulous touchline dash rounded off with his trademark 'swallow dive' over the try-line. During the 1959–60 season Prinsloo scored 4-tries against Liverpool City and a hat-trick of tries against Hull FC, finishing the season with 29-tries from 38 matches. The following year brought more success with a hat-trick of tries against Workington Town, his last match for St. Helens was against Warrington on Saturday 7 January 1961. The transferring of both Prinsloo to Wakefield Trinity and Frank Carlton to Wigan paved the way for a £11,000 World Record transfer to bring Mick Sullivan to Knowsley Road. Prinsloo had the daunting task of wearing the St. Helens number five jersey at the same time as Tom van Vollenhoven was setting the whole game on fire on the other wing. His record and strike-rate demonstrates what a fine finisher Prinsloo was in rugby league. He made his début for Wakefield Trinity during February 1961, and he played his last match for Wakefield Trinity during the 1962–63 season.

=== County Cup Final appearances ===
Jan Prinsloo played on the wing in St. Helens 4–5 defeat by Warrington in the 1959 Lancashire Cup Final during the 1959–60 season at Central Park, Wigan on Saturday 31 October 1959, and played on the wing in the 15–9 victory over Swinton in the 1960 Lancashire Cup Final during the 1960–61 season at Central Park, Wigan on Saturday 29 October 1960 in front of a crowd of over 31,000.
