= Vince Karalius =

English former RL coach and GB international rugby league footballer (1932–2008)

Personal information
- Full name: Vincent Peter Patrick Karalius
- Born: 15 October 1932 Widnes, Lancashire, England
- Died: 13 December 2008 (aged 76) Isle of Man

Playing information
- Height: 5 ft 11 in (1.80 m)
- Weight: 14 st 0 lb (89 kg)
- Position: Centre, Second-row, Loose forward
Club
Years	Team	Pld	T	G	FG	P
1952–62	St. Helens	252	42	0	0	126
1962–66	Widnes	128	6	0	0	18
	Total	380	48	0	0	144
Representative
Years	Team	Pld	T	G	FG	P
1956–63	Lancashire	10	1	0	0	3
1958–63	Great Britain	12	0	0	0	0
1958	GB tour games	13	3	0	0	9

Coaching information
Club
Years	Team	Gms	W	D	L	W%
1972–75	Widnes
1976–79	Wigan
1983–84	Widnes
	Total	0	0	0	0
- Relatives: Tony Karalius (brother)

Vincent "Vince" Peter Patrick Karalius (15 October 1932 – 13 December 2008), also known as "the Wild Bull of the Pampas", was an English rugby league footballer, and coach. He played as a loose forward, and was part of the Great Britain squad which won the 1960 World Cup. He forged a fearsome reputation as a strong runner of the ball and a devastating tackler. He was also highly regarded as a brilliant passer of the ball, often doing so with one of his large hands.

== Club career ==
Vince Karalius was born in Widnes, Lancashire, England. He was one of eight children born to a Scottish father and an Irish mother; his paternal grandparents were Lithuanian. Three of his brothers, Terry, Denis and Tony, also went on to become rugby league players.

He started playing for West Bank ARLFC in Widnes at the age of 15, before signing professionally for St. Helens in 1951. He made his début against Warrington in April 1952, and his first try was against the now defunct Liverpool City in that same time.

His intimidating presence became a telling feature of his play. Respected for his ferocious attitude on the pitch, he was dubbed 'the Wild Bull of the Pampas' by the Australian press, in reference to the Argentine boxer Luis Ángel Firpo, who had knocked World Heavyweight Boxing Champion Jack Dempsey out of the ring back in 1923.

It took until the 1955–56 season for Karalius to establish himself as a St. Helens regular, although a significant part of the 31 games he played that season were in the second row. Many were quick to focus on Karalius' mean defensive play, but his value to St. Helens was also evident in attack where he combined rugby nous with delicate handling skills to distribute effectively.

Vince Karalius played loose forward in St. Helens' 13–2 victory over Halifax in the 1955–56 Challenge Cup Final during the 1955–56 season at Wembley Stadium, London on Saturday 28 April 1956, in front of a crowd of 79,341.

1956–57 was a watershed season for Karalius. He accumulated 18 tries, no mean feat for a forward, and was a member of the St. Helens side which hammered the Australian touring side by 44–2.

Karalius was acknowledged for his contributions to St. Helens' success, including the 1959 'Vollenhoven' Championship Final win by 44–22 over Hunslet. When Alan Prescott retired from the game, Karalius was seen by some as the natural successor to the captaincy of St. Helens. During this period, Vince Karalius played fullback, and was the captain in St. Helens' 12–6 victory over Wigan in the 1961 Challenge Cup Final during the 1960–61 season at Wembley Stadium, London, on Saturday, 13 May 1961, in front of a crowd of 94,672. The first occasion that he lifted a trophy for the club was in season 1960–61 at Central Park, Wigan when St Helens won the Lancashire Cup by 15–9 against Swinton. St. Helens repeated this in the same competition in the following four years (1961–62, 1962–63 and 1964–65 v Swinton and 1963–64 v Leigh).

Vince Karalius played Loose forward in St. Helens' 16–8 victory over Wigan in the 1953 Lancashire Cup Final during the 1953–54 season at Station Road, Swinton on Saturday 24 October 1953, played Loose forward in the 3–10 defeat by Oldham in the 1956 Lancashire Cup Final during the 1956–57 season at Central Park, Wigan, on Saturday 20 October 1956, played Loose forward in the 2–12 defeat by Oldham in the 1958 Lancashire Cup Final during the 1958–59 season at Station Road, Swinton Saturday 25 October 1958, played Loose forward, and was captain in the 15–9 victory over Swinton in the 1960 Lancashire Cup Final during the 1960–61 season at Station Road, Swinton Saturday 29 October 1960, and played Loose forward, and was captain in the 25–9 victory over Swinton in the 1961 Lancashire Cup Final during the 1960–61 season at Station Road, Swinton Saturday 11 November 1961.

Although at St. Helens, Vince Karalius did not appear in the 5–22 defeat by Leigh in the 1952 Lancashire Cup Final during the 1952–53 season at Station Road, Swinton on Saturday 29 November 1952, and the 5–4 defeat by Warrington in the 1959 Lancashire Cup Final during the 1959–60 season at Central Park, Wigan Saturday 31 October 1959, the 7–4 victory over Swinton in the 1962 Lancashire Cup Final during the 1962–63 season at Central Park, Wigan Saturday 27 October 1962.

By 1961–62, St Helens embarked on a rebuilding period as they searched for a new generation of players to press for honours. It would appear that Vince Karalius lay outside those plans when he was sold to his hometown club Widnes in 1962. His last match for St. Helens was against Leeds on January of that year. In all, Karalius appeared in 252 matches for St Helens. He scored 42 tries for 126 points. Despite the move, Karalius would always be remembered by fans and players alike. Alex Murphy acknowledged the support and protection Karalius offered him during their time playing at St Helens. Indeed, according to Murphy:

“He was my loose forward and he was unbelievable to have on your side. If he said it was Christmas, you took his word for it whatever time of year it was – it was Christmas.”

After his move to Naughton Park in 1962, Karalius was appointed club captain. This was a role that Karalius was determined to excel in. Commenting on the move, he revealed the work ethic that was such a foundation for his rugby talent:

"Some players come back to spend their last seasons at their own hometown club like horses being put to grass. I came back to Widnes determined to give 100% effort."

In his first season at Widnes, he helped his hometown team finish third in the Championship, which equalled the club's best league placing. The following season, saw him lead his team to Wembley, where Widnes were Challenge Cup winners, this was the Widnes' first trophy success in eighteen years. In 1966 he announced his retirement.

Vince Karalius played loose forward, and was captain in Widnes' 13–5 victory over Hull Kingston Rovers in the 1964 Challenge Cup Final during the 1963–64 season at Wembley Stadium, London on Saturday 9 May 1964, in front of a crowd of 84,488.

== International career and the "Battle of Brisbane" ==
At 25, Karalius was selected to make the 1958 Tour to Australia – a tour that would go down in rugby league history. It was during the "Battle of Brisbane" in 1958 at the Brisbane Exhibition Ground, when Alan Prescott led the Lions to victory with a broken arm that the Karalius "hardman" status was well and truly enshrined. With Prescott in agony with a broken arm, Karalius was also in trouble with an injury to his back. Tour Manager Tom Mitchell recalls in his book, The Memories and Sporting Life of Tom Mitchell:

"The team went out with Karalius at the far side of the dressing room still on the bench. "Vinty we are out. Come on" "Sorry, Thomas, can't – it's me back". I got in behind him and did enough to get him standing up. Slowly across the room to the sunlit opening leading to the pitch – then a step or two and like a boxer getting up after a knockdown, he teetered with a push onto the arena, gaining movement with every stride. Without him on the field the position was the same as the captain – certain defeat. How he stood up to the first ten minutes I will never know as my eyes steered their gaze from him to Prescott. As I write this 39 years on I permit myself a heartfelt "Phew! No Ashes! No basking in the future unending sunshine of happening to be there as Team Manager".

During this tour, one Australian was moved to write:

"Long-jawed Vince Karalius, the wild bull of the Pampas, is a dedicated wrecker of Australian forwards."

Thereafter, the nickname stuck and Karalius was firmly embedded in the sporting public's conscience as what a rugby league forward should represent.

Karalius represented Great Britain 10 times in his time with St. Helens. He also won five Lancashire caps.

== Coaching ==
Six years after he retired from playing Karalius returned to Widnes – as coach, appointed in January 1972. Karalius imposed onto the club his own values and visions: fitness, determination and winning. He aimed to turn the club into a force, a vision that was achieved as early as 1974–75. First Salford were beaten in the Lancashire Cup Final and then rivals Warrington were defeated in the Challenge Cup. This was the first time in their history that Widnes had recorded two trophies in the same season.

At his zenith, Karalius stepped down once from his role as coach. He was replaced in May 1975 by Frank Myler. He returned to the club for a short spell in March 1983 as co-coach with Harry Dawson. Dawson quit as coach in March 1984 with Karalius continuing as team manager.

Vince Karalius was the coach in Widnes' 19–6 victory over Wigan in the 1984 Challenge Cup Final during the 1983–84 season at Wembley Stadium, London on Saturday 5 May 1984, in front of a crowd of 80,116.

Karalius was also one of the original thirteen former Widnes players inducted into the Widnes Hall of Fame in 1992. In 2000, he became the first forward to be inducted into the British Rugby League Hall of Fame.

== Retirement ==
After retiring from rugby league, Karalius forged a successful scrap metal business. He was a resident of the Isle of Man, where he died 13 December 2008 aged 76.
