= Mick Sullivan =

GB & England international rugby league footballer and coach

Personal information
- Full name: Michael Sullivan
- Born: 12 January 1934 Pudsey, England
- Died: 5 April 2016 (aged 82) Wakefield, England

Playing information
- Position: Wing
Club
Years	Team	Pld	T	G	FG	P
1952–57	Huddersfield	117	93	0		279
1957–61	Wigan	125	84	0	0	252
1961–63	St. Helens	82	31	0	0	93
1963–65	York	26	7	0	0	21
1965–66	Dewsbury	40	2	0	0	6
	Total	390	217	0	0	651
Representative
Years	Team	Pld	T	G	FG	P
1954–63	Great Britain	46	41	0	0	123
1955–62	England	3	2	0	0	6
1957	GB & France	1	1	0	0	3
1955–61	Yorkshire	14	13	0	0	39

Coaching information
Club
Years	Team	Gms	W	D	L	W%
1970	Batley

Michael Sullivan (12 January 1934 – 5 April 2016) was an English professional rugby league footballer and coach who played as a wing. He started his playing career at Huddersfield before joining Wigan for a record transfer fee in 1957. He won two Challenge Cups with the club, and won a third Challenge Cup medal with St Helens after signing with the club for another record fee in 1961.

At international level, he won two World Cups with Great Britain (1954 and 1960), and made 46 appearances for the team during his career, making him Great Britain's joint-most capped player alongside Garry Schofield. He also holds the record for the most rugby league test match tries by a player of any nationality with 44.

== Background ==
Mick Sullivan was born in Pudsey, West Riding of Yorkshire, England, and was educated at Dewsbury Technical School.

== Playing career ==
=== Club career ===
Sullivan signed with Huddersfield in 1952 as an 18-year-old winger. He played on the wing in Huddersfield's 15–8 victory over York in the 1957–58 Yorkshire Cup Final during the 1957–58 season at Headingley, Leeds on Saturday 19 October 1957.

Shortly after the Yorkshire Cup victory, Sullivan handed in a transfer request, and was signed by Wigan for a record fee of £9,500. He played on the wing and scored a try in Wigan's 13–9 victory over Workington Town in the 1957–58 Challenge Cup Final during the 1957–58 season at Wembley Stadium, London on Saturday 10 May 1958, in front of a crowd of 66,109, and played on the wing, and scored a try in the 30-13 victory over Hull F.C. in the 1958–59 Challenge Cup Final during the 1958–59 season at Wembley Stadium, London on Saturday 9 May 1959, in front of a crowd of 79,811.

In January 1961, he was signed by St Helens for a new world record fee of £11,000. Sullivan played his first game for St. Helens in January 1961. While at St. Helens, Sullivan played for England in 1962 against France. He played on the wing in St. Helens 12-6 victory over Wigan in the 1960–61 Challenge Cup Final during the 1960–61 season at Wembley Stadium, London on Saturday 13 May 1961, in front of a crowd of 94,672. He also played, and scored a try, in St. Helens' 25–9 victory over Swinton in the 1961–62 Lancashire Cup Final during the 1961–62 season at Central Park, Wigan on Saturday 11 November 1961, and played on the wing in the 7–4 victory over Swinton in the 1962–63 Lancashire Cup Final during the 1962–63 season at Central Park, Wigan on Saturday 27 October 1962.

Sullivan moved to York before finishing his career with Dewsbury. He later moved to Australia and captain-coached the Junee team in the Group 9 competition in southern New South Wales for three years from 1966 until 1968.

=== International honours ===
He made his début for Great Britain during the 1954 World Cup in France against the Australian team. Sullivan went on to appear in the final and help Great Britain to claim the first ever World Cup. In 1956, he helped Great Britain regain The Ashes, playing in all three Tests against Australia. Sullivan also took part in the 1957 World Cup, and was selected for the 1958 Lions tour, scoring a tour record 38 tries in 19 appearances. He scored a try against Australia in Great Britain's successful 1960 World Cup campaign, becoming the only British player to win the Rugby League World Cup twice.

Sullivan was dropped for the first Test against New Zealand in 1961, ending a run of 36 consecutive appearances since his debut. However, he returned to the side for the next game, and received his second Lions tour invitation in 1962. He made his final Great Britain appearance in 1963, and was capped 46 times overall, a joint-record with Garry Schofield. (Note: Sullivan made 48 senior international appearances for Great Britain, but most sources report him as having 46 caps. The discrepancy is due to two matches played against France in 1955 and 1956, as these have historically not been recognised as official Tests.)

He was selected to play for England while at Huddersfield in 1955 against Other Nationalities, and in 1956 against France. Sullivan also represented a Great Britain & France team in the 37–31 victory over New Zealand at Carlaw Park, Auckland on 3 July 1957.

== Coaching career ==
Sullivan was the coach of Batley from June 1970 to October 1970, during this period he also worked a pipefitter during the building of Fiddlers Ferry power station.

== Death and legacy ==
In 2013, Sullivan was inducted into the Rugby League Hall of Fame.

It was announced on 5 April 2016 that he had died in the previous week, aged 82.

== Notes ==
Achievements
Preceded by Lewis Jones	Rugby league transfer record Huddersfield to Wigan; 1957–1959	Succeeded by Ike Southward
Preceded by Ike Southward	Rugby league transfer record Wigan to St. Helens; 1961	Succeeded by Ike Southward
