= 1960–61 Challenge Cup =

Rugby league competition

- Duration: 5 rounds
- Number of teams: 32
- Highest attendance: 94,672
- Broadcast partners: BBC TV
- Winners: St Helens
- Runners-up: Wigan
- Lance Todd Trophy: Dick Huddart

The 1960–61 Challenge Cup was the 60th staging of rugby league's oldest knockout competition, the Challenge Cup.

The final was contested by St Helens and Wigan at Wembley Stadium was played on Saturday 13 May 1961, where St Helens beat Wigan 12–6 in front of a crowd of 94,672.

The Lance Todd Trophy was awarded to St Helens second-row Dick Huddart.

== First round ==
| Date | Team one | Score one | Team two | Score two |
|---|---|---|---|---|
| 28 Jan | Hull Kingston Rovers | 56 | Pilkington Recs | 8 |
| 11 Feb | Batley | 9 | Bradford Northern | 0 |
| 11 Feb | Bramley | 5 | Rochdale Hornets | 6 |
| 11 Feb | Dewsbury Celtic | 0 | Castleford | 32 |
| 11 Feb | Doncaster | 0 | Warrington | 39 |
| 11 Feb | Huddersfield | 8 | Liverpool | 2 |
| 11 Feb | Hull FC | 4 | Oldham | 2 |
| 11 Feb | Hunslet | 0 | Halifax | 8 |
| 11 Feb | Keighley | 5 | Featherstone Rovers | 11 |
| 11 Feb | Leeds | 5 | Wigan | 5 |
| 11 Feb | Leigh | 6 | Swinton | 8 |
| 11 Feb | St Helens | 5 | Widnes | 5 |
| 11 Feb | Salford | 22 | Dewsbury | 8 |
| 11 Feb | Wakefield Trinity | 11 | York | 3 |
| 11 Feb | Whitehaven | 8 | Blackpool | 3 |
| 11 Feb | Workington Town | 9 | Barrow | 5 |
| 15 Feb | Wigan | 32 | Leeds | 7 |
| 16 Feb | Widnes | 10 | St Helens | 29 |

== Second round ==
| Date | Team one | Score one | Team two | Score two |
|---|---|---|---|---|
| 25 Feb | Castleford | 10 | St Helens | 18 |
| 25 Feb | Hull FC | 16 | Hull Kingston Rovers | 3 |
| 25 Feb | Rochdale Hornets | 9 | Whitehaven | 2 |
| 25 Feb | Salford | 13 | Huddersfield | 5 |
| 25 Feb | Swinton | 11 | Batley | 2 |
| 25 Feb | Wakefield Trinity | 0 | Wigan | 2 |
| 25 Feb | Warrington | 10 | Featherstone Rovers | 13 |
| 25 Feb | Workington Town | 0 | Halifax | 4 |

== Quarterfinals ==
| Date | Team one | Score one | Team two | Score two |
|---|---|---|---|---|
| 11 Mar | Halifax | 18 | Rochdale Hornets | 5 |
| 11 Mar | Hull FC | 10 | Featherstone Rovers | 9 |
| 11 Mar | St Helens | 17 | Swinton | 9 |
| 11 Mar | Wigan | 22 | Salford | 5 |

== Semifinals ==
| Date | Team one | Score one | Team two | Score two |
|---|---|---|---|---|
| 15 Apr | St Helens | 26 | Hull | 9 |
| 15 Apr | Wigan | 19 | Halifax | 10 |

== Final ==
13 May 1961

| St Helens | 12 – 6 | Wigan |
|---|---|---|
| Try: Murphy, van Vollenhoven; Goal: Rhodes (3) | Report | Goal: Griffiths (3) |

Wembley Stadium, London
Attendance: 94,672
Referee: T. W. Watkinson (Manchester)
Player of the Match: Dick Huddart

| FB | 1 | Austin Rhodes |
| RW | 2 | Tom van Vollenhoven |
| RC | 3 | Ken Large |
| LC | 4 | Brian McGinn |
| LW | 5 | Mick Sullivan |
| SO | 6 | Alex Murphy |
| SH | 7 | Wilf Smith |
| PR | 8 | Abe Terry |
| HK | 9 | Bob Dagnall |
| PR | 10 | Cliff Watson |
| SR | 11 | Don Vines |
| SR | 12 | Dick Huddart |
| LF | 13 | Vince Karalius (c) |
Coach:
Alan Prescott

| FB | 1 | Fred Griffiths |
| RW | 2 | Billy Boston |
| RC | 3 | Eric Ashton (c) |
| LC | 4 | Geoff Bootle |
| LW | 5 | Frank Carlton |
| SO | 6 | Dave Bolton |
| SH | 7 | Terry Entwistle |
| PR | 8 | John Barton |
| HK | 9 | Bill Sayer |
| PR | 10 | Brian McTigue |
| SR | 11 | Frank Collier |
| SR | 12 | Geoff Lyon |
| LF | 13 | Roy Evans |
Coach:
Joe Egan
