= Ike Southward =

GB international rugby league footballer and coach

Personal information
- Full name: Isaac Southward
- Born: 15 August 1934 Maryport, England
- Died: 6 June 2006 (aged 71) Workington, England

Playing information
- Position: Wing
Club
Years	Team	Pld	T	G	FG	P
1953-1959, 1961–68	Workington Town	371	274	305	0	1432
1959–61	Oldham	52	54	0	0	162
	Total	423	328	305	0	1594
Representative
Years	Team	Pld	T	G	FG	P
1954–68	Cumberland	13
1958–62	Great Britain	11	5	1	0	17

Coaching information
Club
Years	Team	Gms	W	D	L	W%
≥1968–≥68	Whitehaven RLFC
≥1968–≥68	Workington Town
1973–75	Workington Town
1975–76	Whitehaven RLFC
1976–78	Workington Town
	Total	0	0	0	0

Isaac "Ike" Southward (15 August 1934 – 6 June 2006) was an English professional rugby league footballer who played in the 1950s and 1960s, and coached in the 1960s. He played at representative level for Great Britain and Cumberland, and at club level for Workington Town (two spells), and Oldham, as a wing, and coached at club level for Whitehaven and Workington Town.

== Background ==
Southward was born in Maryport, Cumberland, and came from a family of accomplished rugby players

== Playing career ==
=== International honours ===
Southward won caps for Great Britain while at Workington Town in 1958 against Australia (3 matches) and New Zealand, while at Oldham in 1959 against France (2 matches), and Australia (2 matches), and in 1960 against France (2 matches), and New Zealand.

Southward also represented Great Britain while at Workington Town in 1956 against France (1 non-Test match).

Four Workington players were selected for the 1958 tour of Australia, and New Zealand; Harry Archer, Brian Edgar, Ike Southward and Bill Wookey (later of Barrow).

=== Challenge Cup Final appearances ===
Southward played right wing in the 12-21 defeat by Barrow in the 1955 Challenge Cup Final during the 1954-55 season at Wembley Stadium, London on Saturday 30 April 1955, in front of a crowd of 66,513, and played right wing, and scored a try, and three conversions in the 9–13 defeat by Wigan in the 1958 Challenge Cup Final during the 1957–58 season at Wembley Stadium, London on Saturday 10 May 1958.

=== Club career ===
Oldham paid Workington Town a straight cash world-record transfer fee of £10,065 for Ike Southward at the start of the 1959–60 Northern Rugby Football League season (based on increases in average earnings, this would be approximately £465,100 in 2013), Workington Town then paid Oldham a straight cash world-record transfer fee of £11,002 10s 0d for Ike Southward during the 1960–61 Northern Rugby Football League season (based on increases in average earnings, this would be approximately £499,300 in 2013), this was £2 10s 0d more than St. Helens had recently paid Wigan for Mick Sullivan.

=== Career records ===
Ike Southward holds Workington Town's "Tries in a Career" record (with 274-tries between 1951 and 1968), "Tries in a Match" record (with 7-tries against Blackpool Borough in 1955), and "Consecutive matches in which tries were scored" record (with 10-tries from April to May 1958).

== Death and legacy ==
Southward died on 6 June 2006, aged 71. In December 2006, Whitehaven and Workington Town held a memorial match in tribute to Southward, which later became an annual fixture between the two clubs for the Ike Southward Memorial Trophy.

Achievements
Preceded by Mick Sullivan	Rugby League Transfer Record; Workington Town to Oldham; 1959-1961	Succeeded by Mick Sullivan
Preceded by Mick Sullivan	Rugby League Transfer Record; Oldham to Workington Town; 1961	Succeeded by Brian Shaw
