= 1958–59 Northern Rugby Football League season =

1958–59 Rugby Football League season
- League: Northern Rugby Football League
- League Leaders: St. Helens
- Top point-scorer(s): Fred Griffiths 394
- Top try-scorer(s): Tom van Vollenhoven (62)

The 1958–59 Northern Rugby Football League season was the 64th season of rugby league football. Thirty clubs from across Northern England competed for the Championship, culminating in a final between St. Helens and Hunslet.

== Season summary ==
St. Helens won their third Championship when they beat Hunslet 44–22 in the Championship Final. They had also finished the regular season as the league leaders.

The Challenge Cup winners were Wigan who beat Hull F.C. 30–13 in the final.

Wigan won the Lancashire League, and Wakefield Trinity won the Yorkshire League.

This season, St. Helens winger Tom van Vollenhoven set a new record for most tries in a season, with 62.

== Championship ==
	Team	Pld	W	D	L	Pts
1	St. Helens	38	31	1	6	63
2	Wigan	38	29	0	9	58
3	Hunslet	38	27	3	8	57
4	Oldham	38	28	1	9	57
5	Wakefield Trinity	38	27	1	10	55
6	Swinton	38	27	1	10	55
7	Hull	38	25	1	12	51
8	Widnes	38	23	0	15	46
9	Warrington	38	22	0	16	44
10	Bradford Northern	38	20	2	16	42
11	York	38	20	1	17	41
12	Halifax	38	19	2	17	40
13	Featherstone Rovers	38	18	3	17	39
14	Leeds	38	19	0	19	38
15	Keighley	38	18	1	19	37
16	Leigh	38	18	0	20	36
17	Barrow	38	18	0	20	36
18	Hull Kingston Rovers	38	18	0	20	36
19	Huddersfield	38	18	0	20	36
20	Workington Town	38	16	3	19	35
21	Whitehaven	38	17	0	21	34
22	Salford	38	16	1	21	33
23	Bramley	38	15	1	22	31
24	Blackpool Borough	38	15	0	23	30
25	Castleford	38	13	0	25	26
26	Rochdale Hornets	38	11	1	26	23
27	Batley	38	10	1	27	21
28	Liverpool City	38	8	0	30	16
29	Dewsbury	38	7	0	31	14
30	Doncaster	38	5	0	33	10

Play-offs

=== Play-offs ===
Semi-finals
1	St. Helens	42
4	Oldham	4
2	Wigan	11
3	Hunslet	22

Championship final
St. Helens	44
Hunslet	22

==== Final ====
16 May 1959

St Helens	44 – 22	Hunslet
Tries: Van Vollenhoven (3), Murphy (2), Prinsloo, Smith, Huddart; Goals: Rhodes (10)		Tries: Stockdill, Doyle, Poole, Gunney; Goals: Langton (5)

Odsal Stadium, Bradford
Attendance: 52,560
Referee: G. Wilson (Dewsbury)

FB	1	Austin Rhodes
RW	2	Tom Van Vollenhoven
RC	3	Duggie Greenall
LC	4	Brian McGinn
LW	5	Jan Prinsloo
SO	6	Wilf Smith
SH	7	Alex Murphy
PR	8	Abe Terry
HK	9	Tom McKinney
PR	10	Alan Prescott
SR	11	Brian Briggs
SR	12	Dick Huddart
LF	13	Vince Karalius
Coach:
Jim Sullivan

FB	1	Billy Langton
RW	2	Ron Colin
RC	3	Jim Stockdill
LC	4	Alan Preece
LW	5	Billy Walker
SO	6	Brian Gabbitas
SH	7	Kevin Doyle
PR	8	Don Hatfield
HK	9	Sam Smith
PR	10	Ken Eyre
SR	11	Harry Poole
SR	12	Geoff Gunney
LF	13	Brian Shaw
Coach:
Jack Walkington

== Challenge Cup ==
Wigan reached the final by beating Leeds 12–5 at home on 21 Feb in Round 1; Hunslet 22–4 at home on 7 Mar in Round 2; Halifax 26–0 away on 21 Mar in the quarter-finals and Swinton 5–0 on 11 Apr in the semi-final played at Leigh. Captained by Eric Ashton, they then beat Hull 30–13 in the Challenge Cup Final played at Wembley Stadium before a crowd of 79,811 with tries from Boston (2), Bolton, Holden, McTigue and Sullivan and six goals from Griffiths.

This was Wigan's sixth Challenge Cup Final win in ten Final appearances and their second in successive years. Brian McTigue, their second-row forward, was awarded the Lance Todd Trophy for his man-of-the-match performance.

== County cups ==
Oldham beat St. Helens 12–2 to win the Lancashire Cup, and Leeds beat Wakefield Trinity 24–20 to win the Yorkshire Cup.

== Sources ==
- Saxton, Irvin (ed.). History of Rugby League: No.64 1958–1959. League Publications.
- 1958-59 Rugby Football League season at Wigan.rlfans.com
- The Challenge Cup at The Rugby Football League website
