= Rugby league transfer record =

The Rugby league transfer record is the highest-ever sum of money paid by a club to purchase the contract, and thereby obtain the playing services of another club's player. It has been broken in every decade since the sport became professional around the start of the 20th century. Between the 1930s and 1980s, international transfer bans were imposed, removed and renewed at different times due to the sport's governing bodies' fears of excessive talent drain overseas. In 1998, the sport's transfer system was changed to allow any player aged 24 or over to move between clubs at the end of their contract without a fee being paid. As a result, transfer fees in rugby league became much more uncommon. The current record fee paid is £700,000 (equivalent to £981,464 in 2025), paid by the New Zealand Warriors to the Wigan Warriors in 2013 for Sam Tomkins.

== Record progression ==
Year	Player	From	To	Fee (£)	Notes
1901	James Lomas	Bramley	Salford	100	
1911	James Lomas	Salford	Oldham	300	
1913	Billy Batten	Hunslet	Hull F.C.	600	
1921	Harold Buck	Hunslet	Leeds	1,000	
1930	Stan Smith	Wakefield Trinity	Leeds	1,075	
1934	Stan Brogden	Huddersfield	Leeds	1,200	
1937	Vic Hey	Ipswitch	Leeds	1,400	(Note: This was a "signing on fee" and was at the time higher than the world record transfer fee.)
1937	Billy Belshaw	Liverpool	Warrington	1,450	
1947	Bill Davies	Huddersfield	Dewsbury	1,650	
1947	Bill Hudson	Batley	Wigan	2,000	
1948	Jimmy Ledgard	Dewsbury	Leigh	2,650	
1948	Ike Owens	Leeds	Castleford	2,750	
1949	Stan McCormick	Belle Vue Rangers	St. Helens	4,000	
1949	Albert Naughton	Widnes	Warrington	4,600	
1950	Bruce Ryan	Hull F.C.	Leeds	4,750	
1950	Joe Egan	Wigan	Leigh	5,000	
1952	Lewis Jones	Llanelli	Leeds	6,000	
1957	Mick Sullivan	Huddersfield	Wigan	9,500	
1959	Ike Southward	Workington Town	Oldham	10,650	
1961	Mick Sullivan	Wigan	St. Helens	11,000	
1961	Ike Southward	Oldham	Workington Town	11,002 10s	
1961	Brian Shaw	Hunslet	Leeds	13,250	(Note: Shaw was signed for £9,500 cash, and included a player exchange deal which saw Leeds players Bernard Prior and Norman Burton join Hunslet.)
1968	Colin Dixon	Halifax	Salford	15,000	(Note: Dixon was signed for £12,000 cash, and included a player exchange deal which saw Salford player Mike Kelly join Halifax.)
1969	Paul Charlton	Workington Town	Salford	12,500	
1971	Mal Reilly	Castleford	Manly-Warringah	15,000	
1973	Bill Ashurst	Wigan	Penrith	15,000	
1973	Mike Stephenson	Dewsbury	Penrith	20,000	
1978	Steve Norton	Castleford	Hull F.C.	25,000	(Note: Hull player Jimmy Crampton joined Castleford as part of this deal.)
1978	Phil Hogan	Barrow	Hull Kingston Rovers	33,000	
1980	Len Casey	Bradford	Hull Kingston Rovers	38,000	
1980	Trevor Skerrett	Wakefield Trinity	Hull F.C.	40,000	
1981	George Fairbairn	Wigan	Hull Kingston Rovers	72,500	
1985	Ellery Hanley	Bradford	Wigan	150,000	(Note: Hanley was signed for £85,000 cash, and included a player exchange deal which saw Wigan players Steve Donlan and Phil Ford join Bradford.)
1986	Joe Lydon	Widnes	Wigan	100,000	
1987	Andy Gregory	Warrington	Wigan	130,000	
1987	Lee Crooks	Hull F.C.	Leeds	150,000	
1987	Garry Schofield	Hull F.C.	Leeds	155,000	
1989	Graham Steadman	Featherstone Rovers	Castleford	170,000	(Note: Castleford paid an initial fee of £145,000 for Steadman, and agreed to play an additional £25,000 if he played a Test for Great Britain.)
1991	Ellery Hanley	Wigan	Leeds	250,000	
1992	Martin Offiah	Widnes	Wigan	440,000	
1995	Paul Newlove	Bradford	St. Helens	500,000	(Note: Newlove was signed for £250,000 cash, and included a player exchange deal which saw Saints players Paul Loughlin, Bernard Dwyer and Sonny Nickle join Bradford.)
2006	Stuart Fielden	Bradford	Wigan	450,000	
2013	Sam Tomkins	Wigan	New Zealand	700,000	
