= Bobby Greenough =

GB international rugby league footballer (1939–2024)

Personal information
- Born: 1939 St. Helens district, England
- Died: 20 January 2024 (aged 84)

Playing information
- Position: Wing, Stand-off
Club
Years	Team	Pld	T	G	FG	P
1957–66	Warrington	232	136	0	0	408
Representative
Years	Team	Pld	T	G	FG	P
1958–61	Lancashire	9	7	0	0	21
1960	Great Britain	1	0	0	0	0

Robert J. Greenough (1939 – 20 January 2024) was an English World Cup winning professional rugby league footballer who played in the 1950s and 1960s. He played at representative level for Great Britain and Lancashire, and at club level for Warrington, as a wing, or stand-off.

== Background ==
Robert J. Greenough was born in 1939. His birth was registered in St. Helens district, Lancashire, England. Greenough retired to Eday, one of the islands of Orkney, Scotland. He died on 20 January 2024, at the age of 84.

== Playing career ==
=== International honours ===
Greenough, won a cap for Great Britain while at Warrington in the 1960 Rugby League World Cup against New Zealand.

Greenough played right wing in the first of the three matches for Great Britain's 1960 Rugby League World Cup winning team against New Zealand, being replaced by Jim Challinor in the second game against France, and by Billy Boston in the last game against Australia.

=== Championship final appearances ===
Greenough played in Warrington's 10–25 defeat by Leeds in the Championship Final during the 1960–61 season at Odsal Stadium, Bradford on Saturday 20 May 1961.

=== County Cup Final appearances ===
Greenough played in Warrington's 5–4 victory over St. Helens in the 1959 Lancashire Cup Final during the 1959–60 season at Central Park, Wigan on Saturday 31 October 1959.

=== Club career ===
Greenough made his début for Warrington in the 20–16 victory over Salford at Wilderspool Stadium, Warrington, he scored 30-tries in the 1960–61 season, he is only one of six players to score 30-tries in a season for Warrington, and he is eighth in the list of Warrington all-time try scorers.

== Honoured at Warrington ==
Greenough is a Warrington Wolves Hall of Fame inductee.
