= Brian Shaw (rugby league) =

GB international rugby league footballer

Personal information
- Full name: Brian Shaw
- Born: Jul–Sep 1931; Leeds South district, England
- Died: 13 February 2011 (aged 79); Leeds, England

Playing information
- Position: Prop, Second-row, Loose forward
Club
Years	Team	Pld	T	G	FG	P
1952–61	Hunslet	331	81
1961–64	Leeds	105
1965–??	Hull KR	79	34	0	0	102
	Total	515	115	0	0	102
Representative
Years	Team	Pld	T	G	FG	P
≤1956–≥62	Yorkshire	≥1
1958	Rugby League XIII	1
1956–61	Great Britain	6	1	0	0	3

Brian Shaw (1931 – 13 February 2011) was an English World Cup winning professional rugby league footballer who played in the 1950s and 1960s. He played at representative level for Great Britain, Rugby League XIII and Yorkshire, and at club level for Hunslet and Leeds, as a prop, second-row, or loose forward.

== Background ==
Brian Shaw's birth was registered in Leeds South district, West Riding of Yorkshire, England, and he died aged 79 in Leeds, West Yorkshire, England.

== Playing career ==
=== Club career ===
Shaw was a pupil in the Hunslet Schools system, and signed as a professional for Hunslet from Old Lane Youth Club in Beeston for £250. He was transferred from Hunslet to Leeds during January 1961 for a world record transfer fee of £13,250, in a cash plus player deal, the players being Bernard Prior and Norman Burton (based on increases in average earnings, this would be approximately £583,000 in 2013).

Shaw played in Hunslet's 22-44 defeat by St. Helens in the Championship Final during the 1958–59 season at Odsal Stadium, Bradford on Saturday 16 May 1959, and played loose forward in Leeds' 25-10 victory over Warrington in the Championship Final during the 1960–61 season at Odsal Stadium, Bradford on Saturday 20 May 1961.

=== International honours ===
Shaw won caps for Great Britain while at Hunslet in 1956 against Australia (2 matches), in 1960 against France, Australia, France, and in 1961 against France.

Shaw played second-row, in last two of Great Britain's three 1960 Rugby League World Cup matches, including Great Britain's 10-3 victory over Australia to win the 1960 Rugby League World Cup at Odsal Stadium, Bradford on Tuesday 8 November 1960.

Shaw played loose forward for Rugby League XIII while at Hunslet in the 8-26 defeat by France on Saturday 22 November 1958 at Knowsley Road, St. Helens.

Achievements
Preceded by Ike Southward	Rugby League Transfer Record; Hunslet to Leeds; 1961-1971	Succeeded by Mal Reilly
