= Clive Best =

Welsh rugby league footballer

Personal information
- Born: 4 August 1931; Tredegar, Wales
- Died: 17 April 2013 (aged 81); Crickhowell, Powys, Wales

Playing information

Rugby union
- Position: Full-back
Club
Years	Team	Pld	T	G	FG	P
≤1952–52	Ebbw Vale RFC

Rugby league
- Position: Fullback, Wing, Centre
Club
Years	Team	Pld	T	G	FG	P
1952–57	Barrow	52	0	0	0	0
1957	→ Bradford Northern (loan)	4	0	3	0	6
1957	→ Blackpool Borough (loan)	2	0	1	0	2
	Total	58	0	4	0	8

Clive Best (4 August 1931 – 17 April 2013) was a Welsh rugby union, and professional rugby league footballer who played in the 1950s. He played representative level rugby union (RU) for Welsh Schoolboys, and at club level for Ebbw Vale RFC, as a full-back, and then to usurp the ban on rugby league players, he subsequently played rugby union under the guise of his older brother, Desmond Best, for Romford and Gidea Park Rugby Club, and later Phyllosans RFC (over 40s) until 1981 when he was 50, and club level rugby league (RL) for Barrow and Bradford Northern (loan), as a fullback, wing, or centre.

== Background ==
Clive Best was born in Tredegar, Wales, he worked in the Accounts Department in the Vickers-Armstrongs Shipbuilders in Barrow-in-Furness, he trained as a social worker, and he and his wife Gay became residential Social Workers in Hornchurch, Essex, he later became a Senior Advisor in the Social Services, by 1980 he had qualified as a teacher, and he and Gay became Principal, and Matron (respectively) of a Residential School in Cwmbran. Following rugby union becoming professional, he was re-instated by the Welsh Rugby Union, and became the Chairman of the Welsh Counties RFC, Secretary of the Breconshire County RFC, and Chairman of the Ebbw Vale RFC Past Players Association, and he died aged 81 in Crickhowell, Wales.

== Playing career ==
On 21 November 1952, Best changed rugby football codes from rugby union to rugby league when he transferred from Ebbw Vale to Barrow, for a signing-on fee of £900 (based on increases in average earnings, this would be approximately £62,900 in 2016), with which he bought 23 Windsor Street, Barrow. He had previously had a trial at Oldham, but had declined an offer to join them. He made his début for Barrow against Bramley at Craven Park, Barrow-in-Furness on Saturday 22 November 1952. He played fullback in Barrow's 21-12 victory over Workington Town in the 1954–55 Challenge Cup Final during the 1954–55 season at Wembley Stadium, London on Saturday 30 April 1955, in front of a crowd of 66,513. He left Barrow in 1956, and was replaced by Joe Ball. He played his last match for Barrow against Wakefield Trinity at Belle Vue, Wakefield on Saturday 24 March 1956.
