= Abe Terry =

GB international rugby league player (1934–2024)

Personal information
- Full name: Albert Edward Terry
- Born: 17 May 1934 St Helens, Lancashire, England
- Died: 30 January 2024 (aged 89)

Playing information
- Position: Prop
Club
Years	Team	Pld	T	G	FG	P
1955–61	St. Helens	216	27	0	0	81
1961–≥62	Leeds
1962–64	Featherstone Rovers	51	2	0	0	6
1964–66	Castleford	58	0	0	0	0
	Total	325	29	0	0	87
Representative
Years	Team	Pld	T	G	FG	P
≥1955–≥62	Lancashire
1958–62	Great Britain	11	1	0	0	3

Albert Edward Terry (17 May 1934 – 30 January 2024) was an English professional rugby league player who was active during the 1950s and 1960s. He played at representative level for Great Britain and Lancashire, and at club level for St Helens, Leeds, Featherstone Rovers and Castleford as a prop.

== Background ==
Albert Edward Terry was born on 17 May 1934, in St Helens, Lancashire, England, and he worked at the Ravenhead Colliery in St Helens. He was the younger brother of Mary J. "Josie" Terry, and the older brother of Hugh Terry, John Terry, the rugby league forward of the 1950s and 1960s for St. Helens and Blackpool Borough; Frederick W. Terry, Sheila A. Terry, Frances R. Terry, the twins Francis Terry, and William Terry, and James Vincent Terry.

Terry died on 30 January 2024, at the age of 89.

== Playing career ==
=== International honours ===
Terry won caps for Great Britain while at St. Helens in 1958 against Australia (two matches), in 1959 against France (two matches) and Australia (three matches), in 1960 against France, in 1961 against France (two matches), and while at Leeds in 1962 against France.

=== County League appearances ===
Terry played in St. Helens' victory in the Lancashire League during the 1959–60 season, and played in Castleford's victory in the Yorkshire League during the 1964–65 season.

=== Challenge Cup Final appearances ===
Terry played left-prop in St. Helens 12–6 victory over Wigan in the 1961 Challenge Cup Final during the 1960–61 season at Wembley Stadium, London on Saturday 13 May 1961, in front of a crowd of 94,672.

=== County Cup Final appearances ===
Terry played left-prop in St. Helens 2–12 defeat by Oldham in the 1958 Lancashire Cup Final during the 1958–59 season at Central Park, Wigan on Saturday 25 October 1958; in the 4–5 defeat by Warrington in the 1959 Lancashire Cup Final during the 1959–60 season at Central Park, Wigan on Saturday 31 October 1959; in the 15–9 victory over Swinton in the 1960 Lancashire Cup Final during the 1960–61 season at Central Park, Wigan on Saturday 29 October 1960; and in Featherstone Rovers' 0–10 defeat by Halifax in the 1963 Yorkshire Cup Final during the 1963–64 season at Belle Vue, Wakefield on Saturday 2 November 1963.

=== BBC2 Floodlit Trophy Final appearances ===
Terry played left-prop in Castleford's 4–0 victory over St. Helens in the 1965 BBC2 Floodlit Trophy Final during the 1965–66 season at Knowsley Road, St Helens on Tuesday 14 December 1965.

=== Club career ===
Terry made his début for Featherstone Rovers on Saturday 15 December 1962, and he played his last match for Featherstone Rovers during the 1964–65 season.

== Honoured at St Helens R.F.C. ==
Terry was a St Helens R.F.C. Hall of Fame inductee.
