= Lewis Jones (rugby, born 1931) =

Wales dual-code international rugby footballer (1931–2024)

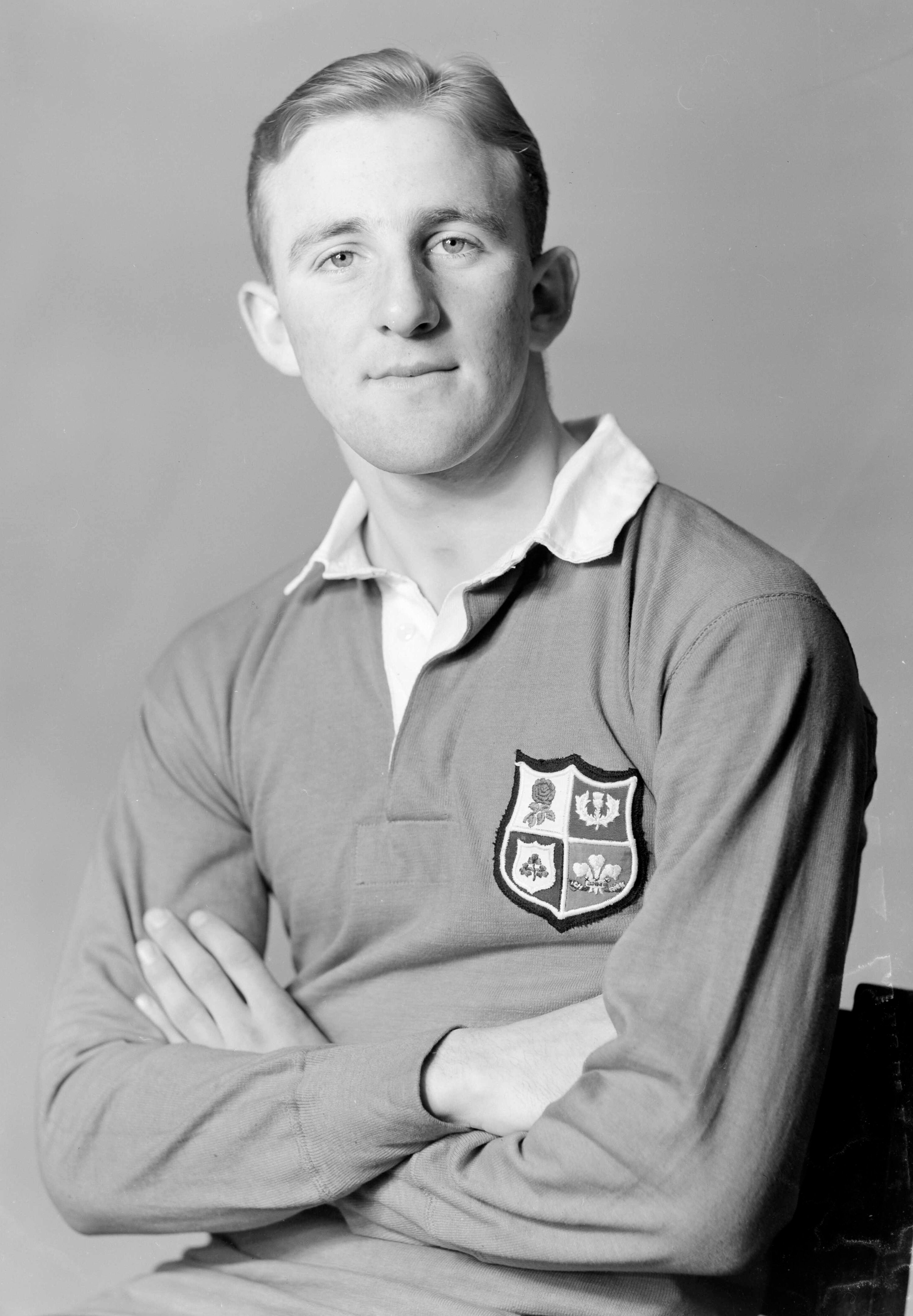
- Jones in New Zealand with the British Lions in 1950

Personal information
- Full name: Benjamin Lewis Jones
- Born: 11 April 1931 Gorseinon, Wales
- Died: 4 March 2024 (aged 92)

Playing information

Rugby union
- Position: Full-back, Centre, Wing
Club
Years	Team	Pld	T	G	FG	P
1948	Neath
1950–1952	Llanelli
	Total	0	0	0	0	0
Representative
Years	Team	Pld	T	G	FG	P
1950–1952	Wales	10	0	9	6	45
1950	British Lions	3	1	4	4	27

Rugby league
- Position: Fullback, Wing, Centre
Club
Years	Team	Pld	T	G	FG	P
1952–1964	Leeds	385	144	1244	0	2920
1964–1969	Wentworthville
	Total	385	144	1244	0	2920
Representative
Years	Team	Pld	T	G	FG	P
1957	Rest of World	1	0	0	0	0
1953–1963	Wales	2	0	5	0	10
1955	Other Nationalities	2	1	9	0	26
1954–1957	Great Britain	15	5	66	0	150

Coaching information
Club
Years	Team	Gms	W	D	L	W%
1964–1971	Wentworthville	156	132	4	20	85
1977–1978	Dewsbury RLFC
	Total	156	132	4	20	85

Benjamin Lewis Jones (11 April 1931 – 4 March 2024) was a Welsh rugby union and rugby league footballer who played in the 1950s and 1960s. A dual-code rugby international, he won ten caps for Wales and three for the British Lions in rugby union, and two for Wales and 15 for Great Britain in rugby league.

In rugby union, he played as a full-back, centre and wing for Llanelli and Neath before turning professional and playing rugby league for Leeds, Wentworthville and Dewsbury RLFC, as well as Other Nationalities. Rugby league historian Robert Gate has described Lewis Jones as "arguably the most devastating attacking back Wales has ever produced."

== Early life ==
Born on 11 April 1931, in Gorseinon, Swansea, Lewis Jones was educated at Gowerton Grammar School, where he played both rugby and cricket.

== Rugby union career ==
Jones played club rugby for Neath before undertaking his national service in the Navy in 1949, a month after his 18th birthday. After leaving the navy he joined Llanelli. He won his first cap for Wales against England in 1950. This was a match Jones might easily have missed, as he had been about to depart for Hong Kong on board an aircraft carrier until the orders were countermanded on discovering that he was a rugby player. The same year he played for the British Lions, being flown out as a replacement for an injured player on the tour to New Zealand and Australia, and playing in three test matches. He scored 63 points in seven games in New Zealand and 16 points against Australia in Brisbane.

== Rugby league career ==
In November 1952, Jones signed for Leeds rugby league club for a record £6,000 (based on increases in average earnings, this would be approximately £419,300 in 2016). A broken arm prevented him having much impact in his first season but in the 1953–54 season he scored 302 points and he first represented Wales in 1953 against France. Jones toured Australasia in 1954. In 1956–57 he scored 496 points, setting a record for points in a season which stood until Max Jowitt surpassed it in 2024. Jones also set the record for most points in a test series in 1956–57. He played in the 1957 World Cup.

In the 1960–61 season, he played a great part in Leeds' first Championship.

Jones played stand-off, was the captain, and scored a try, and five conversions in Leeds' 25–10 victory over Warrington in the Championship Final at Odsal Stadium, Bradford on Saturday 20 May 1961, in front of a crowd of 52,177.

After the 1953 game against France, Wales did not play another RFL officially recognised international match until 1968; but during this period, a representative Wales team played in two games against France, both of which are now considered official by the Rugby League Record Keepers Society who provide data to International Rugby League. The second of these games saw Jones given the captaincy, leading the Wales team out at Toulouse on 17 February 1963.

Jones also represented Great Britain while at Leeds between 1952 and 1956 against France (two non-test matches). Lewis Jones represented the Rest of the World in the 11–20 defeat by Australia at Sydney Cricket Ground on 29 June 1957.

Jones' Testimonial match at Leeds took place in 1963. He was the first Leeds player to score over 1,000 goals for the club, a feat not matched until 2009 by Kevin Sinfield. Jones became one of fewer than ten Welshmen to have scored more than 2,000 points in their rugby league career.

Jones won 15 caps for Great Britain at rugby league, scoring in every game he played. He spent six years as a player-coach and a further two years as coach of the Wentworthville Magpies in Australia. During his eight-year tenure Wentworthville won seven Second Division premierships. A schoolteacher by profession, he later taught mathematics in Leeds.

As of 2015, he is ninth in British rugby league's "most points in a career" record list behind; Neil Fox, Jim Sullivan, Kevin Sinfield, Gus Risman, John Woods, Mick Nanyn, Cyril Kellett and Kel Coslett.

== After playing ==
At a ceremony at Wheldon Road, the home of Castleford, on 20 August 2009, Jones was named as one of thirteen rugby league footballers to be honoured by the Arriva Yorkshire bus operator by having a fleet of new buses named after them. Members of the public, supported by local rugby league journalists James Deighton (BBC Leeds) and Tim Butcher (editor of Rugby League World), nominated the best ever rugby league footballers to have played in West Yorkshire for the 'Arriva Yorkshire Rugby League Dream Team'.

In 2013, Jones and three other former players were inducted into the Rugby League Hall of Fame.

Jones died on 4 March 2024, at the age of 92.

Achievements
Preceded by Joe Egan	Rugby league transfer record Llanelli to Leeds; 1952–1957	Succeeded by Mick Sullivan
