= Brian Edgar =

Former GB & England international rugby league footballer

Personal information
- Full name: Joseph Brian Edgar
- Born: 26 March 1936 Great Broughton, Cumberland, England
- Died: 4 October 2001 (aged 65) Seaton, Cumbria, England

Playing information
- Weight: 15 st 0 lb (95 kg)

Rugby union
Club
Years	Team	Pld	T	G	FG	P
≤1954–≤54	Workington RFC

Rugby league
- Position: Prop, Second-row
Club
Years	Team	Pld	T	G	FG	P
1954–68	Workington Town	384	99	27	0	303
Representative
Years	Team	Pld	T	G	FG	P
	Cumberland	13
1962	England	1	0	0	0	0
1958–66	Great Britain	11	0	0	0	0

Joseph Brian Edgar (26 March 1936 – 5 October 2001) was an English rugby union, and professional rugby league footballer who played in the 1950s and 1960s. He played club level rugby union (RU) for Workington RFC, and representative level rugby league (RL) for Great Britain (captain), and England, and at club level for Workington Town, as a prop or second-row.

== Background ==
Brian Edgar was born in Great Broughton, Cumberland, England. While growing up, he played both rugby union at Cockermouth Grammar School, and rugby league for his local team in Broughton. He died aged 65 in Seaton, Cumbria.

== Playing career ==
=== Workington Town ===
Edgar played second-row in Workington Town's 12–21 defeat by Barrow in the 1955 Challenge Cup Final during the 1954–55 season at Wembley Stadium, London on Saturday 30 April 1955, in front of a crowd of 66,513, and played second-row in the 9–13 defeat by Wigan in the 1958 Challenge Cup Final during the 1957–58 season at Wembley Stadium, London on Saturday 10 May 1958.

Edgar is a Workington Town Hall Of Fame Inductee.

=== International honours ===
Edgar won a cap for England (RL) while at Workington in 1962 against France, and won caps for Great Britain (RL) while at Workington in 1958 against Australia, and New Zealand, in 1961 against New Zealand, in 1962 against Australia (3 matches), and New Zealand, in 1965 against New Zealand, and in 1966 against Australia (3 matches).

Edgar and Leeds' Joseph "Joe" Thompson are the only forwards to be selected for three Australasian tours.

Four Workington players were selected for the 1958 tour of Australia, and New Zealand; Harry Archer, Brian Edgar, Ike Southward and Bill Wookey (later of Barrow).
