= Don Hatfield =

English rugby league footballer

- Donald Hatfield in 1959

Personal information
- Full name: Donald Hatfield
- Born: 6 November 1924; Dewsbury, England
- Died: 1981 (aged 56–57)

Playing information
- Height: 6 ft 1 in (1.85 m)
- Weight: 17 st 0 lb (108 kg)
- Position: Prop
Club
Years	Team	Pld	T	G	FG	P
1946–51	Halifax	119	2	0	0	6
1951–53	Dewsbury
1953–61	Hunslet	274	23	0	0	69
1961–62	Bradford Northern	29	1	0	0	3
	Total	422	26	0	0	78

Donald "Don" Hatfield (6 November 1924 – 1981) was an English professional rugby league footballer who played in the 1940s, 1950s and 1960s. He played at club level for Halifax, Dewsbury and Hunslet, as a prop..

== Background ==
Donald Hatfield's birth was registered in Dewsbury, West Riding of Yorkshire, England, he worked as a railway lad (messenger) aged c. 15 in c. 1939, he worked at W. E. Rawson, Portobello Road, Wakefield c. 1960s–1970s, he lived on Headfield Road, Thornhill Lees, Dewsbury c. 1980, and he died aged 56–57.

== Playing career ==
=== Club career ===
Hatfield signed for Halifax from Dewsbury Juniors during 1946. He was placed on the transfer list, at his own request, at a fee of £2,500 during October 1950. He was transferred from Halifax to Dewsbury on Wednesday 29 August 1951. He was transferred from Dewsbury to Hunslet, and made his début for Hunslet playing at prop against Hull Kingston Rovers at Old Craven Park, Kingston upon Hull on Saturday 24 October 1953. He played his last match for Hunslet during the 1961–62 season.

Hatfield played at prop in Hunslet's 22–44 defeat by St. Helens in the Championship Final during the 1958–59 season at Odsal Stadium, Bradford on Saturday 16 May 1959, in front of a crowd of 52,560.
