= Harry Archer (rugby) =

English RL coach and former rugby league footballer (1932–2019)

Personal information
- Full name: Henry Archer
- Born: 26 November 1932 Dearham, Cumbria, England
- Died: 24 June 2019 (aged 86) Whitehaven, Cumbria, England

Playing information
- Weight: 13 st 8 lb (86 kg)

Rugby union
Club
Years	Team	Pld	T	G	FG	P
1948–52	Workington RFC

Rugby league
- Position: Stand-off
Club
Years	Team	Pld	T	G	FG	P
1953–67	Workington Town	385	64	8		208
	Whitehaven	7
	Total	392	64	8	0	208
Representative
Years	Team	Pld	T	G	FG	P
1955–67	Cumberland	14

Coaching information
Club
Years	Team	Gms	W	D	L	W%
1983–84	Workington Town	34	24	2	8	71

Henry "Harry" Archer (26 November 1932 – 24 June 2019), also known by the nickname of "The Architect", was an English rugby union and professional rugby league footballer who played in the 1950s and 1960s, and coached rugby league in the 1980s. He played club level rugby union (RU) for Workington RFC, and representative level rugby league (RL) for Great Britain (non-Test matches), and Cumberland, and at club level for Dearham ARLFC (in Dearham), Grasslot and Glasson Rangers ARLFC (in Grasslot, Maryport/Glasson, Maryport, now known as Glasson Rangers ARLFC), Workington Town and Whitehaven, as a stand-off and coached (jointly with Bill Smith) at club level for Workington Town.

== Early life ==
Archer was born in Dearham, Cumberland, England. His birth was registered in Cockermouth district, Cumberland. He undertook his national service in the RAF Flying Training Command. He owned a grocery store on Main Road in Seaton.

== Rugby union ==
Archer played in Workington RFC's 1952–53 Cumberland Cup final.

== Rugby league ==
=== Club career ===
Archer signed for Workington Town on 30 March 1953, the half-back pairing of Harry Archer and Sol Roper was initially made in the 29–15 victory over Dewsbury at Crown Flatt, Dewsbury on Saturday 24 September 1955, the following week they played together against New Zealand, the pairing lasted for more than a 10-years and over 300 matches, although not prolific try-scorers, they created hundreds of try-scoring opportunities for, e.g. Ray Glastonbury, Piet Pretorius and Ike Southward.

Archer played stand-off in Workington Town's 9–13 defeat by Wigan in the 1958 Challenge Cup final during the 1957–58 season at Wembley Stadium, London on Saturday 10 May 1958. He was concussed within the first ten-minutes of the match by a stiff-arm tackle by Mick Sullivan, and had to leave the playing field, and although he returned to the match, he could not remember anything about the rest of the match.

Archer played in Workington Town's 3–20 defeat by Hull F.C. in the Championship Final during the 1957–58 season at Odsal Stadium, Bradford on Saturday 17 May 1958.

Archer played stand-off in Workington Town's 9–9 draw with Widnes in the Western Division Championship Final during the 1962–63 season at Central Park, Wigan on Saturday 10 November 1962, in front of a crowd of 13,588, and he played stand-off in the 10–0 victory over Widnes in the Western Division Championship Final replay during the 1962–63 season on Wednesday 21 November 1962.

Archer played his last match for Workington Town against Huddersfield on Saturday 19 November 1966, he was transferred from Workington Town to Whitehaven, he made seven appearances for Whitehaven before retiring.

=== Representative honours ===
Archer represented Great Britain (RL) while at Workington in non-Test matches on the 1958 tour of Australia, and New Zealand.

Four Workington players were selected for the 1958 tour; Harry Archer, Brian Edgar, Ike Southward and Bill Wookey (later of Barrow).

Archer made his début, and scored a try for Cumberland against Lancashire at Derwent Park, Workington during the 1955–56 season, and he played in Cumberland's victories in the County Championship during the 1961–62 season, 1963–64 season, 1965–66 season and 1966–67 season.

== Coaching career ==
Archer coached (jointly with Bill Smith) Workington Town to promotion from the Second Division during the 1983–84 season.

== Honoured at Workington Town ==
Archer is a Workington Town Hall Of Fame Inductee.

== Personal life ==
Archer was the son of Robert P. Archer, the rugby league half-back who played in the 1940s for England (Amateurs, now British Amateur Rugby League Association), Dearham ARLFC and Workington Town.
