= Eric Fraser (rugby league) =

GB international rugby league footballer

Personal information
- Full name: Eric Gordon Fraser
- Born: 7 January 1931 St. Helens, Lancashire, England
- Died: 6 July 2000 (aged 69) Penketh, Cheshire, England

Playing information
- Position: Fullback
Club
Years	Team	Pld	T	G	FG	P
1951–64	Warrington	352	50	473		1096
Representative
Years	Team	Pld	T	G	FG	P
1958–61	Great Britain	16	1	53	0	109
1956–61	Lancashire	10	0	34	0	68

Eric Gordon Fraser (7 January 1931 – 6 July 2000) was an English World Cup winning professional rugby league footballer who played in the 1950s and 1960s. He played at representative level has played for Great Britain (captain), and at club level for Warrington (captain), as a goal-kicking fullback.

== Playing career ==
Fraser won caps for Great Britain while at Warrington in 1958 against Australia (3 matches), and New Zealand (2 matches), in 1959 against France (2 matches), and Australia, in 1960 against France (2 matches), New Zealand, and France (2 matches), and in 1961 against France, and New Zealand (2 matches). He played fullback, and scored a goal in Warrington's 5-4 victory over St. Helens in the 1959–60 Lancashire Cup Final during the 1959–60 season at Central Park, Wigan on Saturday 31 October 1959. Fraser played fullback in the first two of the three matches for Great Britain's 1960 Rugby League World Cup winning team, being replaced by Austin Rhodes in the last game against Australia.

Fraser was inducted to the Warrington Wolves Hall of Fame.
