= Jackie Edwards (rugby league) =

English rugby league footballer (1939–2025)

Personal information
- Full name: Jack Edwards
- Born: 12 August 1939
- Died: 17 May 2025 (aged 85); Standish, Greater Manchester, England

Playing information
- Position: Scrum-half
Club
Years	Team	Pld	T	G	FG	P
1955–64	Warrington	223	78	2	0	238
Representative
Years	Team	Pld	T	G	FG	P
1962	Lancashire	2	0	0	0	0
- Relatives: Shaun Edwards (son)

Jack Edwards (12 August 1939 – 17 May 2025) was an English rugby league footballer who played as a scrum-half. He played for over 200 games for Warrington between 1955 and 1964.

== Playing career ==
After leaving school, Edwards signed for Warrington on his 16th birthday in August 1955. He made his first team debut in November 1955 against Wakefield Trinity in the Independent Television Floodlit Trophy competition, becoming the youngest ever player to play for the club.

Edwards helped Warrington win the 1959–60 Lancashire Cup with a 5–4 victory in the final against St Helens. He also played in the 1960–61 Championship final, but was on the losing side in a 10–25 defeat against Leeds.

He was forced to retire prematurely from the sport in 1964 due to a spinal injury. In 1966, Warrington arranged a testimonial fund for Edwards.

In 2013, he was inducted into Warrington's Hall of Fame.

== Personal life and death ==
Edwards was the father of the rugby league scrum-half and rugby union coach, Shaun Edwards.

Edwards died on 17 May 2025, at the age of 85, after spending several years at a nursing home in Standish, Greater Manchester.
