= Dennis Goodwin =

GB & England international rugby league footballer

Personal information
- Full name: Dennis Goodwin
- Born: 1929; Barrow-in-Furness, England
- Died: 12 April 2011 (aged 81); Barrow-in-Furness, England

Playing information
- Position: Centre, Prop, Second-row
Club
Years	Team	Pld	T	G	FG	P
≤1955–59	Barrow
1959–61	Leeds
1961–64	York
	Total	0	0	0	0	0
Representative
Years	Team	Pld	T	G	FG	P
1955	England	1	0	0	0	0
1957–58	Great Britain	5	0	0	0	0
1958	Lancashire	3	0	0	0	0

Dennis Goodwin (1929 – 12 April 2011) was an English professional rugby league footballer who played in the 1950s and 1960s. He played at representative level for Great Britain and England, and at club level for Barrow, Leeds and York, as a centre, prop, or second-row.

== Background ==
Dennis Goodwin's birth was registered in Barrow-in-Furness, Lancashire, England, and he died in Barrow-in-Furness, Cumbria, England.

== Playing career ==
=== International honours ===
Dennis Goodwin won a cap for England while at Barrow in 1955 against Other Nationalities, and won caps for Great Britain while at Barrow in 1957 against France (2 matches), in 1958 against France, and New Zealand (2 matches).

=== Championship final appearances ===
Dennis Goodwin played at second-row in Leeds' 25–10 victory over Warrington in the Championship Final during the 1960–61 season at Odsal Stadium, Bradford on Saturday 20 May 1961.

=== Challenge Cup Final appearances ===
Dennis Goodwin played at centre in Barrow's 0–10 defeat by Wigan in the 1951 Challenge Cup Final during the 1950–51 season at Wembley Stadium, London on Saturday 5 May 1951, in front of a crowd of 94,262, and played at centre in the 21–12 victory over Workington Town in the 1954–55 Challenge Cup Final during the 1954–55 season at Wembley Stadium, London on Saturday 30 April 1955, in front of a crowd of 66,513.

=== County Cup Final appearances ===
Dennis Goodwin played at centre in Barrow's 12–2 victory over Oldham in the 1954 Lancashire Cup Final during the 1954–55 season at Station Road, Swinton on Saturday 23 October 1954, and played at centre in Leeds' 9–19 defeat by Wakefield Trinity in the 1961 Yorkshire Cup Final during the 1961–62 season at Odsal Stadium, Bradford on Saturday 11 November 1961.
