= 1962 Great Britain Lions tour =

- Date: 20 May 1962 – 31 August 1962
- Manager: Stuart Hadfield
- Coach(es): Colin Hutton
- Tour captain(s): Eric Ashton
- Top point scorer(s): Neil Fox (277)
- Top try scorer(s): Neil Fox (23)
Summary
P	W	D	L
Total
33	27	0	6
Test match
8	5	0	3
Opponent
P	W	D	L
Australia
3	2	0	1
New Zealand
2	0	0	2
South Africa
3	3	0	0

Tour chronology
- Previous tour: 1958
- Next tour: 1966

The 1962 Great Britain Lions tour was the Great Britain national rugby league team's 12th tour of Australasia and took place from May to August 1962. A total of 30 matches were played against local club and representative sides during the tour, including a three match Test match series against Australia and a two-game series against New Zealand. The team additionally played three games in South Africa on the way home from the Australasia tour.

Great Britain retained The Ashes against Australia, but lost both Tests against New Zealand.

== Touring squad ==
The 26-man touring squad was selected on 22 March 1962, with Eric Ashton named as captain, and Derek Turner chosen as vice-captain. Colin Hutton was appointed to coach the team, and Wakefield Trinity chairman Stuart Hadfield was the tour manager.

== Results ==
=== Australia ===
20 May 1962

Western Australia	12 – 39	Great Britain

Perth

23 May 1962

Riverina	7 – 34	Great Britain

Wagga Wagga

26 May 1962

Sydney	13 – 21	Great Britain

Sydney

27 May 1962

Western NSW	10 – 24	Great Britain

Bathurst

2 June 1962

New South Wales	28 – 33	Great Britain

Sydney

4 June 1962

Newcastle	23 – 18	Great Britain

Newcastle

==== First Test ====
9 June 1962

Australia	12 – 31	Great Britain
Tries: Gasnier, Irvine; Goals: Parish (3)		Tries: Ashton (2), Sullivan (2), Boston, Huddart, Turner; Goals: N. Fox (5)

Sydney Cricket Ground, Sydney
Attendance: 70,174
Referee: Darcy Lawler

10 June 1962

North Coast NSW	13 – 33	Great Britain

Lismore

13 June 1962

Brisbane	14 – 16	Great Britain

Brisbane

16 June 1962

Queensland	17 – 22	Great Britain

Brisbane

17 June 1962

Toowoomba	12 – 36	Great Britain

Toowoomba

20 June 1962

Central Queensland	8 – 55	Great Britain

Rockhampton

23 June 1962

Far North Queensland	31 – 33	Great Britain

Cairns

24 June 1962

North Queensland	14 – 47	Great Britain

Townsville

==== Second Test ====
30 June 1962

Australia	10 – 17	Great Britain
Tries: Irvine, Summons; Goals: Barnes (2)		Tries: Boston (2), Murphy; Goals: N. Fox (3); Drop goals: Ashton

Lang Park, Brisbane
Attendance: 34,766
Referee: Jack Casey

1 July 1962

Wide Bay	20 – 84	Great Britain

Maryborough

7 July 1962

New South Wales	5 – 20	Great Britain

Sydney

8 July 1962

Southern NSW	18 – 10	Great Britain

Wollongong

==== Third Test ====
14 July 1962

Australia	18 – 17	Great Britain
Tries: Irvine (2), Drake, Summons; Goals: Irvine (3)		Tries: Ashton, N. Fox, Murphy; Goals: N. Fox (4)

Sydney Cricket Ground, Sydney
Attendance: 42,104
Referee: Darcy Lawler

18 July 1962

St George	5 – 33	Great Britain

Sydney

22 July 1962

Northern NSW	13 – 56	Great Britain

Tamworth

=== New Zealand ===
25 July 1962

Waikato	20 – 59	Great Britain

Huntly

==== First Test ====
28 July 1962

New Zealand	19 – 0	Great Britain
Tries: Reidy (2), Ackland, Bond, Edwards; Goals: Denton, Smith

Carlaw Park, Auckland
Attendance: 14,976
Referee: Rolly Avery

31 July 1962

Māoris	5 – 35	Great Britain

Wellington

2 August 1962

Canterbury	5 – 26	Great Britain

Christchurch

4 August 1962

New Zealand XIII	17 – 31	Great Britain

Christchurch

5 August 1962

West Coast	8 – 66	Great Britain

Greymouth

7 August 1962

Bay of Plenty	14 – 81	Great Britain

Rotorua

==== Second Test ====
11 August 1962

New Zealand	27 – 8	Great Britain
Goals: Wiggs (7)		Tries: N. Fox, Small; Goals: Gilfedder

Carlaw Park, Auckland
Attendance: 16,411
Referee: Rolly Avery

13 August 1962

Auckland	46 – 13	Great Britain

Auckland

=== South Africa ===
23 August 1962

South Africa	30 – 49	Great Britain

Pretoria

25 August 1962

South Africa	33 – 39	Great Britain

Durban

31 August 1962

South Africa	23 – 45	Great Britain

Johannesburg
