= Dick Huddart =

English rugby league footballer (1936–2021)

Personal information
- Full name: Richard Huddart
- Born: 22 June 1936 Flimby, Cumberland, England
- Died: 11 August 2021 (aged 85) Australia

Playing information
- Height: 6 ft 0 in (1.83 m)
- Weight: 15 st 0 lb (95 kg)
- Position: Prop, Hooker, Second-row
Club
Years	Team	Pld	T	G	FG	P
1956–58	Whitehaven	64	34	0	0	102
1958–64	St. Helens	209	76	0	0	228
1964–68	St. George	78	16	0	0	48
1970–71	Whitehaven	7	0	0	0	0
	Total	358	126	0	0	378
Representative
Years	Team	Pld	T	G	FG	P
1958–63	Great Britain	16	2	0	0	6
1962	England	1	0	0	0	0
1956–63	Cumberland	11	4	0	0	12
- Relatives: Milton Huddart (son)

Richard Huddart (22 June 1936 – 11 August 2021) was an English professional rugby league footballer who played in the 1950s, 1960s and 1970s. A Great Britain and England international representative forward, he played at club level in England for Whitehaven and St Helens (with whom he won the 1961 Challenge Cup), and in Australia for St. George (with whom he won the 1966 NSWRFL Premiership). Huddart was both a Whitehaven and St Helens R.F.C. Hall of Fame inductee.

== Background ==
Dick Huddart was born in Flimby, Cumberland on 22 June 1936. After leaving school he worked as a fitter at a local coal mine. He played amateur rugby for Risehow, Huddart turned professional, signing with rugby league club Whitehaven in 1954.

== Playing career ==
=== Britain ===
Huddart's first team debut for Whitehaven came in August 1956 against Warrington, the following month he played in his first County Championship match for Cumberland. Huddart played right-second-row in Whitehaven's 14–11 victory over Australia in the 1956–57 Kangaroo tour of Great Britain and France match at the Recreation Ground, Whitehaven on Saturday 20 October 1956, in front of a crowd of 10,917. Later that year he became the first Whitehaven player to be selected to play for the Great Britain national rugby league team, touring Australia and New Zealand as a member of the 1958 Great Britain team and winning the Ashes being capped four times on the tour - twice against Australia and wice against New Zealand.

Upon his return, Huddart decided to move to St. Helens, signing with them in October, 1958. During the 1959–60 season he played as a second-row in St. Helens' 4–5 loss against Warrington in the 1959 Lancashire Cup final at Central Park, Wigan on Saturday 31 October 1959. While at St. Helens he played for Great Britain in 1959 against Australia, in 1961 against New Zealand (three matches), in 1962 against France (two matches), Australia (three matches), and New Zealand (two matches), and in 1963 against Australia. During the 1960–61 season Huddart played at second-row and was named man of the match, winning the Lance Todd Trophy in the 12–6 victory over Wigan in the 1961 Challenge Cup final at Wembley Stadium, London on Saturday 13 May 1961, in front of a crowd of 94,672. He also helped Great Britain retain the Ashes in the 1962 tour of Australia. Huddart won a single cap for England while at St. Helens in 1962 against France. During the 1960–61 season he played at second-row in the 15–9 victory over Swinton in the 1960 Lancashire Cup final at Central Park, Wigan on Saturday 29 October 1960. During the 1961–62 season he played right-second-row in the 25–9 victory over Swinton in the 1961 Lancashire Cup final at Central Park, Wigan on Saturday 11 November 1961. During the 1962–63 season he played at second-row in the 7–4 victory over Swinton in the 1962 Lancashire Cup final at Central Park, Wigan on Saturday 27 October 1962.

=== Australia ===
Huddart moved to Australia to play for NSWRFL club St. George from the 1964 season. It was hoped he could help fill the large shoes left in the record-breaking champion St. George side's second-row by the retiring Norm Provan. Huddart went on to help the Dragons continue their dominance in that period, scoring a try in the 1966 NSWRFL season's Grand Final victory over Balmain. The turning point of that match came when Huddart and Ian Walsh put on a set move as the Balmain defence rushed up too early. Walsh burst through the line and with only the fullback to beat and passed the ball to Huddart who raced 30 yards to score. Huddart thus became the first Great Britain Test player to win a premiership in Australia. After leaving St. George, Huddart became player-coach at Dubbo Macquarrie in the Western Division of the NSWRL.

Huddart returned to Britain in 1970–71 to play a final season with Whitehaven.

== Personal life ==
Huddart was married twice, his first marriage to Iris ended in divorce after the family returned to England in 1970. After the divorce Huddart returned to Australia where he met and married his second wife, Lyn. He was the father of rugby league footballer; Milton Huddart while and uncle, Dan Huddart, also played professional rugby league for Workington Town.

He died on 11 August 2021, aged 85.
