= Tom van Vollenhoven =

South Africa international rugby union & league footballer

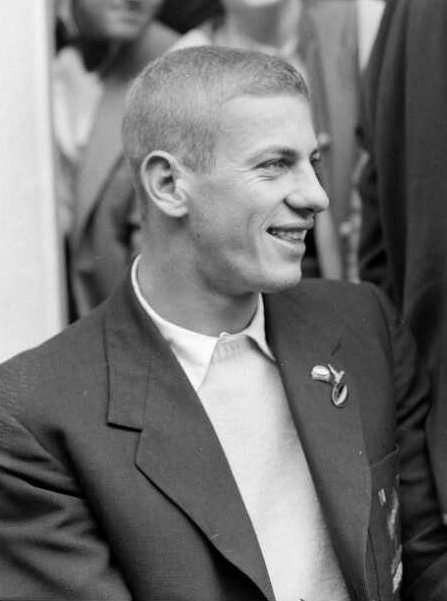
- Van Vollenhoven in New Zealand in 1956

Personal information
- Full name: Karel Thomas van Vollenhoven
- Born: 29 April 1935 Bethlehem, Free State, South Africa
- Died: 21 October 2017 (aged 82) South Africa

Playing information

Rugby union
- Position: Wing
Club
Years	Team	Pld	T	G	FG	P
	Northern Transvaal
Representative
Years	Team	Pld	T	G	FG	P
1955–56	South Africa	7	4	0	1	15

Rugby league
- Position: Wing
Club
Years	Team	Pld	T	G	FG	P
1957–68	St. Helens	409	392	0	0	1176
Representative
Years	Team	Pld	T	G	FG	P
1958	Northern RL XIII	2	2	0	0	6
1961	Rugby League XIII		1	0		3

Karel Thomas van Vollenhoven (29 April 1935 – 21 October 2017) was a South African rugby league and rugby union footballer who played in the 1950s and 1960s. He enjoyed a prolific rugby league career with English club St Helens after switching codes from rugby union in the 1950s. Van Vollenhoven became a rugby league sensation with the club in a career spanning ten seasons from 1957 to 1968. During this time he amassed a club record 392 tries in 408 appearances. This includes a record 62-tries scored during the 1958–59 season. In 2000, he was inducted into the Rugby League Hall of Fame.

== Early life ==
Van Vollenhoven was born 29 April 1935 in Bethlehem, Free State, South Africa.

He played rugby union for Northern Transvaal, and Northern Rhodesia and scored a hat-trick for the Springboks against the British Lions, and then toured Australasia the following year with the national team before going to Britain to play professionally in 1957. Tom van Vollenhoven had been scouted by the 13-a-side code in 1955 in a 'cloak and dagger' style operation which saw English club St. Helens vie off the competition of Wigan for his services, and the attention of the South African RFU.

== Move to Britain ==
Van Vollenhoven was brought into a St. Helens team to add a scoring threat out wide, in a side that at the time, was more noted for its forward prowess. His rugby league début was against Leeds at Knowsley Road, and his first experience of the code was a negative one as he was responsible for a blunder which gifted the Yorkshire side a try. However such disappointment was short lived as Van Vollenhoven produced a harbinger with a well taken try later in the same match much to the excitement of the Knowsley Road faithful. His centre, Duggie Greenall was given strict orders to nurse and protect Van Vollenhoven whilst he found his way in his new game. Greenall was noted as something of a hardman, notably involved in a scandal with the Australians who claimed Greenall's ruthless tackling had more to do with him using a plaster cast as to his tackling itself. Regardless, Greenall proved to be a fine centre for Van Vollenhoven in his early days, ensuring that the wingman received little risky ball and that adequate defensive cover was provided when necessary.

Van Vollenhoven equalled St. Helens' club record for most tries in a match with 6 against Wakefield Trinity in 1957. The crew cut wingman would prove over the years what an extraordinary talent he was, with arguably his finest moment coming in the 1958–59 Championship Final at Odsal, where his hat trick of tries helped St. Helens overcome Hunslet. His first try is noted in rugby league folklore as one of the greatest tries in the history of the game. Van Vollenhoven beat a series of defenders in a blistering run down the touchline culminating in a try under the sticks. Regrettably, there is no video footage of this achievement as the cameras were not filming for this short period of the game. Many contend that until Van Vollenhoven's intervention, there was every chance that the Yorkshiremen could have overturned the favourites.

Tom van Vollenhoven played right wing and scored a length-of-the-field try in St. Helens' 12–6 victory over Wigan in the 1961 Challenge Cup Final during the 1960–61 season at Wembley Stadium, London on Saturday 13 May 1961, in front of a crowd of 94,672, and played right wing in the 21–2 victory over Wigan in the 1966 Challenge Cup Final during the 1965–66 season at Wembley Stadium on Saturday 21 May 1966, in front of a crowd of 98,536.

Tom van Vollenhoven played right wing in St. Helens' 2–12 defeat by Oldham in the 1958 Lancashire Cup Final during the 1958–59 season at Station Road, Swinton on Saturday 25 October 1958, played right wing in the 4–5 defeat by Warrington in the 1959 Lancashire Cup Final during the 1959–60 season at Central Park, Wigan on Saturday 31 October 1959, played right wing, and scored a try in the 15–9 victory over Swinton in the 1960 Lancashire Cup Final during the 1960–61 season at Central Park on Saturday 29 October 1960, played right wing, and scored a try in the 25–9 victory over Swinton in the 1961 Lancashire Cup Final during the 1961–62 season at Central Park on Saturday 11 November 1961, played right wing, and scored a try in the 7–4 victory over Swinton in the 1962 Lancashire Cup Final during the 1962–63 season at Central Park on Saturday 27 October 1962, played right-centre and scored a try in the 15–4 victory over Leigh in the 1963 Lancashire Cup Final during the 1963–64 season at Station Road, Swinton on Saturday 26 October 1963, played right wing in the 2–2 draw with Warrington in the 1967 Lancashire Cup Final during the 1967–68 season at Central Park on Saturday 7 October 1967, and played right wing in the 13–10 victory over Warrington in the replay Station Road on Saturday 2 December 1967.

Tom van Vollenhoven played right wing in St. Helens' 0–4 defeat by Castleford in the 1965 BBC2 Floodlit Trophy Final during the 1965–66 season at Knowsley Road, St. Helens on Tuesday 14 December 1965.

Over the years Van Vollenhoven matured into a fine all round athlete, honing the other areas of the game that a modern-day winger is required to fulfil. This is supported by the fact that Van Vollenhoven had occasionally appeared at centre and even played one game at full-back. He established himself as a strong defensive wingman, capable of rushing over to the other flank to pull off try-saving cover tackles, whilst he was a stronger player than looks would suggest. The 1960s were a golden era for wingers in the British league, and debate continues to this day over who can lay claim to be the premier winger of the generation. Commentators are split over whether Van Vollenhoven's searing speed, or the sheer power of Billy Boston marked them as the finest winger of their era.

Tom van Vollenhoven's final St. Helens match was against Hull Kingston Rovers in April 1968 and his final game of rugby league was guesting for Great Britain in a trial match for the 1968 World Cup, at Thrum Hall, Halifax. Many former players would testify that rugby league was a brutal and vicious game in the 1950s and 1960s. The game was not as sanitised as it is in the Super League era and matches could be attritional affairs. Inevitably, injury took its toll by the mid-1960s. With Van Vollenhoven etching out a reputation as a prolific scorer, opponents would employ unscrupulous tactics to counter his threat, such as the vicious stiff-arm unleashed by Huddersfield's Peter Ramsden, at Knowsley Road in 1963, which saw Van Vollenhoven lying prostrate on the turf, unable to continue. In his final season in 1967–68, Van Vollenhoven was a shadow of himself although he was regarded as a good player and underlined this by tallying three tries in his last appearance against Wigan at Knowsley Road.

== Death ==
Van Vollenhoven died in his native South Africa on 21 October 2017 aged 82.
