= Austin Rhodes =

English RL coach and former GB international rugby league footballer (1937–2019)

Personal information
- Born: 25 February 1937 St. Helens, England
- Died: 12 February 2019 (aged 81) St. Helens, England

Playing information
- Position: Fullback, Centre, Stand-off, Scrum-half
Club
Years	Team	Pld	T	G	FG	P
1955–62	St. Helens	221	90	800	0	1870
1962–65	Leigh	81	9	51	0	129
1965–68	Swinton	87	7	15	0	51
1968–69	St Helens	44	7	15	0	51
	Total	433	113	881	0	2101
Representative
Years	Team	Pld	T	G	FG	P
1957–59	Lancashire	2	0	1	0	2
1957–61	Great Britain	4	2	3	0	12

Coaching information
Club
Years	Team	Gms	W	D	L	W%
1974–75	Swinton
1976–78	Pilkington Recs
	Total	0	0	0	0

Austin J. Rhodes (25 February 1937 – 12 February 2019) was an English World Cup winning professional rugby league footballer who played in the 1950s and 1960s, and coached in the 1970s. He played at representative level for Great Britain, and at club level for St Helens (two spells), Leigh and Swinton as a goal-kicking fullback, centre, stand-off or scrum-half, and coached at club level for Swinton and Pilkington Recs.

== Background ==
Rhodes' birth was registered in St Helens, Lancashire, England, and he was a pupil at St Austin's School in Thatto Heath.

== Playing career ==
=== Championship final appearances ===
Rhodes played fullback, and scored 10-goals in St. Helens' 44-22 victory over Hunslet in the Championship Final during the 1958–59 season at Odsal Stadium, Bradford on Saturday 16 May 1959.

=== County league appearances ===
Rhodes played in St. Helens' victory in the Lancashire League during the 1959–60 season and 1968–69 season.

=== Challenge Cup Final appearances ===
Rhodes played scrum-half, and scored 2-goals in St. Helens 13-2 victory over Halifax in the 1955–56 Challenge Cup Final during the 1955–56 season at Wembley Stadium, London on Saturday 28 April 1956, in front of a crowd of 79,341, and played fullback, and scored 3-goals and 2-drop goals in the 12-6 victory over Wigan in the 1960–61 Challenge Cup Final during the 1960–61 season at Wembley Stadium, London on Saturday 13 May 1961, in front of a crowd of 94,672.

=== County Cup Final appearances ===
Rhodes played stand-off in St. Helens' 3-10 defeat by Oldham in the 1956–57 Lancashire Cup Final during the 1956–57 season at Central Park, Wigan on Saturday 20 October 1956, played fullback, and scored 2-goals in the 4-5 defeat by Warrington in the 1959–60 Lancashire Cup Final during the 1959–60 season at Central Park, Wigan on Saturday 31 October 1959, played stand-off, and scored 1-try, and 3-goals in the 15-9 victory over Swinton in the 1960–61 Lancashire Cup Final during the 1960–61 season at Central Park, Wigan on Saturday 29 October 1960, played fullback, and scored 1-try, and 5-goals in the 25-9 victory over Swinton in the 1961–62 Lancashire Cup Final during the 1961–62 season at Central Park, Wigan on Saturday 11 November 1961, played stand-off in Leigh's 4-15 defeat by St. Helens in the 1963–64 Lancashire Cup Final during the 1963–64 season at Knowsley Road, St. Helens on Saturday 26 October 1963, and played fullback in St. Helens' 30-2 victory over Oldham in the 1968–69 Lancashire Cup Final during the 1968–69 season at Central Park, Wigan on Friday 25 October 1968.

=== Tour matches ===
Rhodes played stand-off, and scored 1-try, and 7-goals in St. Helens 44-2 victory over Australia in the 1956-57 Kangaroo tour of Great Britain and France during the 1956–57 season at Knowsley Road, St. Helens on Saturday 24 November 1956, played fullback, and scored 1-goals in St. Helens 2-15 defeat by Australia in the 1959-60 Kangaroo tour of Great Britain and France during the 1959–60 season at Knowsley Road, St. Helens on Saturday 10 October 1959.

=== International honours ===
Rhodes won caps for Great Britain while at St Helens in the 1957 Rugby League World Cup against New Zealand, in the 1960 Rugby League World Cup against France (2-tries) and Australia (2-goals), and in 1961 against New Zealand.

== Death ==
Rhodes died on 12 February 2019, aged 81.
