= Laurie Gilfedder =

GB international rugby league footballer (1935–2019)

Personal information
- Full name: Lawrence M. Gilfedder
- Born: 15 May 1935 Warrington, Lancashire, England
- Died: 7 January 2019 (aged 83) Warrington Hospital, Warrington, England

Playing information
- Height: 6 ft 0 in (1.83 m)
- Weight: 15 st 0 lb (95 kg)
- Position: Centre, Second-row, Loose forward
Club
Years	Team	Pld	T	G	FG	P
1951–63	Warrington	283	96	426		1140
1963–67	Wigan	145	17	388		827
1967–68	Leigh	40	4	83		178
	Total	468	117	897	0	2145
Representative
Years	Team	Pld	T	G	FG	P
1959–63	Lancashire	9	1	14	0	31
1962–63	Great Britain	5	0	1	0	2

Lawrence "Laurie"/"Gilly" M. Gilfedder (15 May 1935 – 7 January 2019) was an English rugby union and professional rugby league footballer who played in the 1950s and 1960s. He played club level rugby union (RU) for Warrington RUFC (in Walton, Warrington), and representative level rugby league (RL) for Great Britain and Lancashire, and at club level for Warrington, Wigan, and Leigh, as a goal-kicking centre, second-row, or loose forward.

== Background ==
Gilfedder's birth was registered in Warrington, Lancashire, he was raised in Woolston and moved to Stockton Heath after his marriage in 1955, he was a senior warehouse supervisor for Greenall's Brewery from 1960–91, he died, aged 83, on 7 January 2019 in Warrington Hospital, Warrington.

== Playing career ==
=== International honours ===
Laurie Gilfedder won caps for Great Britain while at Warrington on the 1962 Great Britain Lions tour against Australia, New Zealand (2 matches), and France, and in 1963 against France.

Only five players have played test matches for Great Britain as both a back, and a forward, they are Gilfedder, Colin Dixon, Frank Gallagher, Billy Jarman and Harry Street.

=== Challenge Cup Final appearances ===
Laurie Gilfedder played loose forward, and scored a try, and three goals, including a penalty from the halfway line after one-minute ten-seconds, in Wigan's 20–16 victory over Hunslet in the 1965 Challenge Cup Final during the 1964–65 season at Wembley Stadium, London on Saturday 8 May 1965, in front of a crowd of 89,016, and played, and scored a goal in the 2–21 defeat by St. Helens in the 1966 Challenge Cup Final during the 1965–66 season at Wembley Stadium, London on Saturday 21 May 1966, in front of a crowd of 98,536.

=== County Cup Final appearances ===
Laurie Gilfedder played at second-row scored a try, and two goals in Wigan's 16–13 victory over Oldham in the 1966 Lancashire Cup Final during the 1966–67 season at Station Road, Swinton, on Saturday 29 October 1966.

=== BBC2 Floodlit Trophy Final appearances ===
Laurie Gilfedder played loose forward, and scored a goal in Leigh's 5–8 defeat by Castleford in the 1967 BBC2 Floodlit Trophy Final during the 1967–68 season at Headingley, Leeds on Saturday 16 January 1968.

=== Club career ===
Laurie Gilfedder made his début for Warrington aged 16 years and 199 days against the Belle Vue Rangers on Saturday 1 December 1951, during his time at Warrington they won the 1953–54 and 1954–55 Championship, the 1953–54 Challenge Cup (in which he did not play), the 1953–54, 1954–55 and 1955–56 Lancashire League, and the 1959–60 Lancashire Cup. With 22 tries he was Warrington's leading try-scorer during the 1956–57 season (the only season from 1947 to 1961 that it wasn’t Brian Bevan). He played his last match for Warrington, and scored five goals in the 13-15 defeat by Hull Kingston Rovers at Old Craven Park, Kingston upon Hull on Saturday 1 June 1963, he was transferred to Wigan during August 1963 for a club record fee of £9,500 (based on increases in average earnings, this would be approximately £382,500 in 2017).

He made his début for Wigan in the 10-3 victory over Widnes at Central Park, Wigan on Saturday 24 August 1963, he scored his first try for Wigan in the 22-6 victory over Leeds at Central Park, Wigan on Wednesday 4 September 1963, following the rule change to allow of substitutions, along with Chris Hesketh he jointly became Wigan's first interchange/substitute in the 3-10 defeat by Widnes at Naughton Park, Widnes on Saturday 14 November 1964, he scored his last try for Wigan in the 40-0 victory over Whitehaven at Central Park, Wigan on Saturday 12 November 1966, he played his last match for Wigan Match in the 12-15 defeat by Swinton at Central Park, Wigan on Saturday 2 September 1967, he made his début for Leigh during the 1967–68 season, and he played his last match for Leigh during the 1968–69 season.

== Honoured at Warrington Wolves ==
Laurie Gilfedder is a Warrington Hall of Fame inductee.
