= 1959–60 Lancashire Cup =

- Structure: Regional knockout championship
- Teams: 14
- Winners: Warrington
- Runners-up: St. Helens

The 1959–60 Lancashire Cup was the forty-seventh occasion on which the competition had been held. Warrington won the trophy by beating St. Helens by the score of 5-4.

== Background ==
With again no invitation to a junior club this season, the total number of teams entering the competition remained the same at 14.
The same fixture format was retained, and due to the number of clubs this resulted in no bye but one “blank” or “dummy” fixture in the first round, and one bye in the second round

== Competition and results ==
=== Round 1 ===
Involved 7 matches (with no bye but one “blank” fixture) and 14 clubs

Game No	Fixture date	Home team	Score	Away team	Venue	Att	Rec	Notes	Ref
1	Sat 29 Aug 1959	Widnes	21-15	Barrow	Naughton Park				
2	Sat 29 Aug 1959	Leigh	12-12	Blackpool Borough	Hilton Park			1	
3	Sat 29 Aug 1959	Salford	45-8	Liverpool City	The Willows				
4	Sat 29 Aug 1959	Whitehaven	23-5	Oldham	Recreation Ground				
5	Sat 29 Aug 1959	Wigan	39-20	Rochdale Hornets	Central Park				
6	Sat 29 Aug 1959	Swinton	9-17	St. Helens	Station Road	14,000			
7	Sat 29 Aug 1959	Workington Town	12-33	Warrington	Derwent Park				
8		blank		blank					

=== Round 1 - Replay ===
Involved 1 match

Game No	Fixture date	Home team	Score	Away team	Venue	Att	Rec	Notes	Ref
1	Thu 03 Sep 1959	Blackpool Borough	7-13	Leigh	St Anne's Road Greyhound Stadium				

=== Round 2 - quarterfinals ===
Involved 3 matches (with one bye) and 7 clubs

Game No	Fixture date	Home team	Score	Away team	Venue	Att	Rec	Notes	Ref
1	Mon 07 Sep 1959	Wigan	39-15	Salford	Central Park				
2	Wed 09 Sep 1959	Leigh	2-27	Warrington	Kirkhall Lane				
3	Wed 09 Sep 1959	Widnes	9-24	St. Helens	Naughton Park	16,630			
4		Whitehaven		bye					

=== Round 3 – semifinals ===
Involved 2 matches and 4 clubs

Game No	Fixture date	Home team	Score	Away team	Venue	Att	Rec	Notes	Ref
1	Tue 15 Sep 1959	Wigan	13-15	Warrington	Central Park				
2	Tue 29 Sep 1959	Whitehaven	2-18	St. Helens	Recreation Ground	12,500		2	

=== Final ===
The match was played at Central Park, Wigan, (historically in the county of Lancashire). The attendance was 39,237 and receipts were £6,424. This is the last time the attendance at a Lancashire Cup final would approach 40,000.

Game No	Fixture date	Home team	Score	Away team	Venue	Att	Rec	Notes	Ref
	Saturday 31 October 1959	Warrington	5-4	St. Helens	Central Park	39,237	£6,424	1	

==== Teams and scorers ====
Warrington	№	St. Helens
	Teams	
Eric Fraser	1	Austin Rhodes
Brian Bevan	2	Tom van Vollenhoven
Jim Challinor	3	Doug Greenall
Laurie Gilfedder	4	Brian McGinn
Terry O'Grady	5	Jan Prinsloo
Bobby Greenough	6	Wilf Smith
Jackie Edwards	7	Alex Murphy
Nat Silcock	8	Abe Terry
Paddy Lannon	9	Tom McKinney
Alastair Brindle	10	Alan Prescott
John Arkwright	11	Brian Briggs
Harry Major	12	Dick Huddart
Albert Naughton	13	Fred Terry
5	score	4
5	HT	4
	Scorers	
	Tries	
Brian Bevan (1)	T	
	Goals	
Eric Fraser (1)	G	Austin Rhodes (2)
Referee Mr M Coates of Pudsey		Touch-Judges Tangerine Flag - A Shaw of Leigh Pink Flag - J W Ellis of Widnes

Scoring - Try = three (3) points - Goal = two (2) points - Drop goal = two (2) points

=== The road to success ===
First round
Wigan	39
Rochdale Hornets	20
Salford	45
Liverpool City	8
Leigh	12-13
Blackpool Borough	7-12
Workington Town	12
Warrington	33
Whitehaven	23
Oldham	5
blank
blank
Widnes	21
Barrow	15
Swinton	9
St. Helens	17

Second round
Wigan	39
Salford	15
Leigh	7
Warrington	13
Whitehaven
bye
Widnes	2
St. Helens	27

Semifinals
Wigan	13
Warrington	15
Whitehaven	2
St. Helens	18

Final
Warrington	5
St. Helens	4

== Notes and comments ==
1 * The first Lancashire Cup match to be played since the stadium was renamed after the former chairman James Hilton
2 * The fixture date was given in the official St. Helens archives as Wednesday 30 September - but RUGBY LEAGUE review gives the date as Tuesday 29 September
3 * Central Park was the home ground of Wigan with a final capacity of 18,000, although the record attendance was 47,747 for Wigan v St Helens 27 March 1959

== See also ==
- 1959–60 Northern Rugby Football League season
- Rugby league county cups
