= 1960–61 Northern Rugby Football League season =

- League: Northern Rugby Football League
- Champions: Leeds
- League Leaders: Leeds
- Top point-scorer: Austin Rhodes 338
- Top try-scorer: Tom van Vollenhoven 54

The 1960–61 Northern Rugby Football League season was the 66th season of rugby league football.

== Season summary ==
Leeds won their first Championship when they defeated Warrington 25-10 in the play-off final.

The Challenge Cup winners were St. Helens who beat Wigan 12-6 in the final.

Swinton won the Lancashire League, and Leeds won the Yorkshire League.

== Championship ==
	Team	Pld	W	D	L	Pts
1	Leeds	36	30	0	6	60
2	Warrington	36	27	1	8	55
3	Swinton	36	27	1	8	55
4	St. Helens	36	27	0	9	54
5	Wigan	36	26	0	10	52
6	Leigh	36	26	0	10	52
7	Wakefield Trinity	36	26	0	10	52
8	Oldham	36	25	1	10	51
9	Featherstone Rovers	36	23	1	12	47
10	Workington Town	36	21	0	15	42
11	Hull	36	20	1	15	41
12	Hull Kingston Rovers	36	19	2	15	40
13	Halifax	36	19	1	16	39
14	Huddersfield	36	18	2	16	38
15	Hunslet	36	18	0	18	36
16	Whitehaven	36	17	2	17	36
17	Castleford	36	16	2	18	34
18	York	36	16	2	18	34
19	Batley	36	16	1	19	33
20	Widnes	36	16	0	20	32
21	Blackpool Borough	36	14	3	19	31
22	Bramley	36	12	1	23	25
23	Salford	36	11	2	23	24
24	Bradford Northern	36	10	2	24	22
25	Keighley	36	10	1	25	21
26	Barrow	36	9	2	25	20
27	Dewsbury	36	8	3	25	19
28	Rochdale Hornets	36	9	0	27	18
29	Liverpool City	36	5	1	30	11
30	Doncaster	36	3	0	33	6

Play-offs

=== Play-offs ===
Semi-finals
1	Leeds	11
4	St. Helens	4
2	Warrington	13
3	Swinton	5

Championship final
Leeds	25
Warrington	10

=== Championship final ===
This match was Warrington loose forward Albert Naughton's last appearance.

Saturday, 20 May 1961
15:00

Leeds	25 – 10	Warrington
Tries: Derek Hallas (2); Jack Fairbank; Lewis Jones; Goals: Lewis Jones		Tries: Jim Challinor (2) Goals: Laurie Gilfedder (2)

Odsal Stadium, Bradford
Attendance: 52,177

Leeds	Number	Warrington
	Teams	
Ken Thornett	1	Eric Fraser
Wilf Rosenberg	2	Brian Bevan
Derek Hallas	3	Jim Challinor
Vince Hattee	4	Joe Pickavance
Eddie Ratcliffe	5	Terry O'Grady
Lewis Jones	6	Bobby Greenough
Colin Evans	7	Jackie Edwards
Don Robinson	8	Alastair Brindle
Barry Simms	9	Bill Harper
Trevor Whitehead	10	Jack Arkwright
Jack Fairbank	11	Laurie Gilfedder
Dennis Goodwin	12	Harry Major
Brian Shaw	13	Albert Naughton
Joe Warham	Coach	Cec Mountford

== Challenge Cup ==
St Helens reached the Challenge Cup Final by beating Widnes 29–10 on 16 Feb away in round one after a 5–5 draw at home on 11 Feb; Castleford 18–10 away in round two on 25 Feb; Swinton 17–9 at home in the quarter-finals on 11 Mar and Hull 26–9 on neutral ground in the semi-final on 15 Apr.

St Helens beat Wigan 12–6 (5–2 at Half Time) in the Final played at Wembley Stadium in front of a crowd of 94,672 on 13 May 1961. St Helens’ points were scored by Alex Murphy (try), Tom van Vollenhoven (try) and Austin Rhodes (one conversion and two drop goals). The Lance Todd Trophy winner was St Helens' second-row forward, Dick Huddart.

This was St Helens’ second Challenge Cup Final win in six Final appearances.

== County cups ==
St Helens beat Swinton 15–9 to win the Lancashire Cup, and Wakefield Trinity beat Huddersfield 16–10 to win the Yorkshire Cup.

== Sources ==
- 1960-61 Rugby Football League season at wigan.rlfans.com
- The Challenge Cup at The Rugby Football League website
