= Bill Wookey =

English rugby league footballer

Personal information
- Full name: William Wookey
- Born: 1936 Barrow-in-Furness, England
- Died: 6 August 2019 (aged 83)

Playing information
- Position: Wing, Centre
Club
Years	Team	Pld	T	G	FG	P
1954–61	Workington Town
1961–64	Barrow
1964–65	Blackpool Borough	6	0	0	0	0
	Total	6	0	0	0	0

William Wookey was an English professional rugby league footballer who played in the 1950s and 1960s. He spent most of his career with Workington Town, with whom he played in two Challenge Cup finals. He also played for Barrow and Blackpool Borough, and was selected by Great Britain for the 1958 Lions tour, but did not earn any caps.

== Playing career ==
Born in Barrow-in-Furness, Wookey initially played rugby union for Furness RUFC, making his first team debut at the age of 15. He turned professional in 1954, switching to rugby league to join Workington Town.

Wookey played at stand-off in Workington Town's 12–21 defeat by Barrow in the 1954–55 Challenge Cup final at Wembley Stadium, London on Saturday 30 April 1955. He returned to Wembley with Workington in the 1957–58 Challenge Cup final on Saturday 10 May 1958, but was once again on the losing side, playing on the wing in the 9–13 defeat by Wigan.

Wookey was one of four Workington Town players to be selected by Great Britain for the 1958 Lions tour. He made 10 appearances for Great Britain during the tour, but did not feature in any Test matches.

In January 1961, he was transferred to his hometown club Barrow, where he scored 12 tries in 64 appearances. He finished his playing career with one season at Blackpool Borough.

== Personal life ==
Wookey married in November 1958 to Mary Teresa Pattison.
