= Brian McTigue =

Former GB international rugby league footballer

Personal information
- Full name: Brian J. McTigue
- Born: 3 August 1930; Beech Hill, Wigan, Lancashire, England
- Died: 9 December 1981, Standish Lower Ground, Wigan, Lancashire, England. (aged 51)

Playing information
- Position: Centre, Right-Prop, Second-row
Club
Years	Team	Pld	T	G	FG	P
1951–67	Wigan	422	44	3	0	138
1967	Blackpool Borough	1	0	0	0	0
	Total	423	44	3	0	138
Representative
Years	Team	Pld	T	G	FG	P
1958–63	Great Britain	25	2	0	0	6

Brian McTigue (3 August 1930 – 9 December 1981), also known by the nickname "The Wizard", was an English World Cup winning professional rugby league footballer who played in the 1950s and 1960s. He is a Wigan RL Hall of Fame member and is considered to be one of the greatest forwards in Great Britain's history.

== Background ==
Brian McTigue's birth was registered in Wigan, Lancashire, England, and he died aged 51.

== Playing career ==
‘Sheer Wizardry' often described the distribution skills and sleight of hand of Brian McTigue. He started his Wigan career as a centre, but took his handling skills into the pack where he won many club and international honours.

The sport however, nearly missed the talents of Brian McTigue because boxing was his first love at one time. He was so highly rated that former world champion Joey Maxim invited him to the United States after McTigue had figured in some exhibitions with the American. McTigue decided to stick with rugby and, after only five games as a hooker for the Giants Hall Colliery team, Wigan signed him and converted him into a three quarter.

Although he made his début at Oldham in April 1951, he spent the next three years languishing in the 'A' Team. Wigan were prepared to sell him to Oldham but he refused. His patience paid off and, just as it looked as though he was not going to make it, he suddenly shot to prominence.

The rest of his career was nothing but one success after another. He went on to become one the all-time great prop forwards being capped 21 times by Great Britain. He made his Great Britain début against Australia in 1958 and toured twice.

Brian McTigue played right-prop and scored a try in Wigan's 8–13 defeat by Oldham in the 1957–58 Lancashire CupFinal during the 1957–58 season at Station Road, Swinton on Saturday 19 October 1957.

Brian McTigue's Testimonial match at Wigan took place in 1960.

McTigue also appeared at Wembley that year and score on try in the 13–9 win over Workington Town. He scored another try a year later as Wigan beat Hull F.C., and enjoyed one of his own personal great moments as he strode like a colossus through the Hull defence and collected the Lance Todd Trophy. He was in all four Wigan sides that went to Wembley in the 1960s, and collected a third winner's medal when they beat Hunslet in 1965. After more than 400 matches, his long association with the club ended in 1966–67. He moved to Blackpool Borough but played only one more game before going to Australia to coach Bathurst St Patricks. He later returned to Wigan to work.

== Challenge Cup Final appearances ==
Brian McTigue played right-prop and scored a try in Wigan's 13–9 victory over Workington Town in the 1957–58 Challenge Cup Final during the 1957–58 season at Wembley Stadium, London on Saturday 10 May 1958, in front of a crowd of 66,109 played left-second-row and scored a try in the 30–13 victory over Hull F.C. in the 1958–59 Challenge Cup Final during the 1958–59 season at Wembley Stadium, London on Saturday 9 May 1959, in front of a crowd of 79,811, and played right-prop in the 20–16 victory over Hunslet in the 1964–65 Challenge Cup Final during the 1964–65 season at Wembley Stadium, London on Saturday 8 May 1965, in front of a crowd of 89,016.
