= Brian Bevan =

Australian rugby league footballer

Personal information
- Full name: Brian Eyrl Bevan
- Born: 24 January 1924 Sydney, New South Wales, Australia
- Died: 3 June 1991 (aged 67) Southport, England, United Kingdom

Playing information
- Position: Wing
Club
Years	Team	Pld	T	G	FG	P
1942–46	Eastern Suburbs	8	0	1	0	2
1946–62	Warrington	620	740	34	0	2288
1962–64	Blackpool Borough	42	17	0	0	51
	Total	670	757	35	0	2341
Representative
Years	Team	Pld	T	G	FG	P
1949–55	Other Nationalities	16	26	0	0	78
1952	British Empire XIII	1	1	0	0	3
1954	Rugby League XIII	1	2	0	0	6
- Source: As of 2 March 2022
- Father: Rick Bevan
- Military career
- Allegiance: Australia
- Branch: Royal Australian Navy
- Service years: 1939-1946
- Conflicts: World War II

Brian Eyrl Bevan (24 January 1924 – 3 June 1991), also known by the nickname of "Wing Wizard", was an Australian professional rugby league footballer who played in the 1940s, 1950s and 1960s. He became the only player ever to be inducted into both the Australian Rugby League Hall of Fame and British Rugby League Hall of Fame. An Other Nationalities representative wing and the record try scorer in the history of the Rugby League European Championship, Bevan scored a world record 796 tries, mainly for Warrington. In 2008, the centenary year of rugby league in Australia, he was named on the wing of Australia's Team of the Century (1908–2007). Bevan was the only player chosen in the team who had never represented Australia in a test match.

== Early years ==
Brian Eyrl Bevan was born in Sydney on 24 January 1924. The son of former Eastern Suburbs' player Rick Bevan, Brian Bevan began his career playing for Easts in 1942. He made eight appearances for the club. When World War II began in 1939 he decided to join the Royal Australian Navy, which restricted his appearances for the club. Bevan never scored a try for Easts. His brother, Owen 'Ozzy' Bevan played for Sydney club the St George Dragons as well as Warrington.

== Britain ==
=== 1940s ===
Bevan arrived on board HMAS Australia in Britain in 1946, and all he had with him was a letter of recommendation written by former Eastern Suburbs Test winger Bill Shankland. Bevan requested a trial with Leeds, which was a suggestion from Shankland, but the club decided against signing him partially due to his frail looking appearance. Shankland also recommended he try Hunslet if Leeds refused to sign him, but once again he was turned down. He then decided to try his luck with the Warrington club. Warrington decided to give him an 'A' team trial in November in which he scored a try. The club were impressed with his first performance and decided to play him in the first team a week later. The club then decided to sign him on a permanent basis on a £300 contract. He returned home to Australia for several months in order to complete his Navy service, before returning to Warrington.

In 1946–47, his first season, Bevan scored 48 tries for the club – 14 tries more than any other player in the league. Bevan was the top try scorer in England in five seasons.

Bevan was the 1947–48 Northern Rugby Football League season's top try scorer and also played for Warrington in their Championship final victory.

Bevan scored a try in Warrington's 8–14 defeat by Wigan in the 1948–49 Lancashire Cup Final during the 1948–49 season at Station Road, Swinton on Saturday 13 November 1948,

=== 1950s ===
Brian Bevan played on the wing in Warrington's 19–0 victory over Widnes in the 1949–50 Challenge Cup Final during the 1949–50 season at Wembley Stadium, London on Saturday 6 May 1950 in front of a crowd of 94,249. Within four years at the Warrington club Bevan had surpassed the club's try scoring record of 215 set by Jack Fish over thirteen seasons. He played in Warrington's 5–28 defeat by Wigan in the 1950–51 Lancashire Cup Final during the 1950–51 season at Swinton on Saturday 4 November 1950. He was the 1950–51 Northern Rugby Football League season's top try scorer.

Bevan played for the British Empire XIII against New Zealand on Wednesday 23 January 1952 at Stamford Bridge in London. Bevan was the 1952–53 Northern Rugby Football League season's top try scorer. His best season for try scoring feats was in 1952–53 when he amassed a total of 72 tries. Only Albert Rosenfeld has scored more tries in a single season in Britain. Rosenfeld holds the top two most tries in a season with 78 in 1911–12 and 80 in 1913–14.

Bevan played on the wing in the 8–4 victory over Halifax in the 1953–54 Challenge Cup Final replay at Odsal, Bradford on Wednesday 5 May 1954, in front of a record crowd of 102,575 or more. He was the top try scorer of the 1953–54 Northern Rugby Football League season and also became the highest try scorer in the game's history when he passed the 446 tries mark set by Alf Ellaby.

Bevan helped Warrington win the 1954–55 Northern Rugby Football League season's Championship.

He scored a try in Warrington's 5–4 victory over St. Helens in the 1959–60 Lancashire Cup Final during the 1959–60 season at Central Park, Wigan on Saturday 31 October 1959.

=== 1960s ===
In 1961 Bevan returned to Australia to play for an Eastern Suburbs seven-a-side competition for Keith Holman's testimonial.

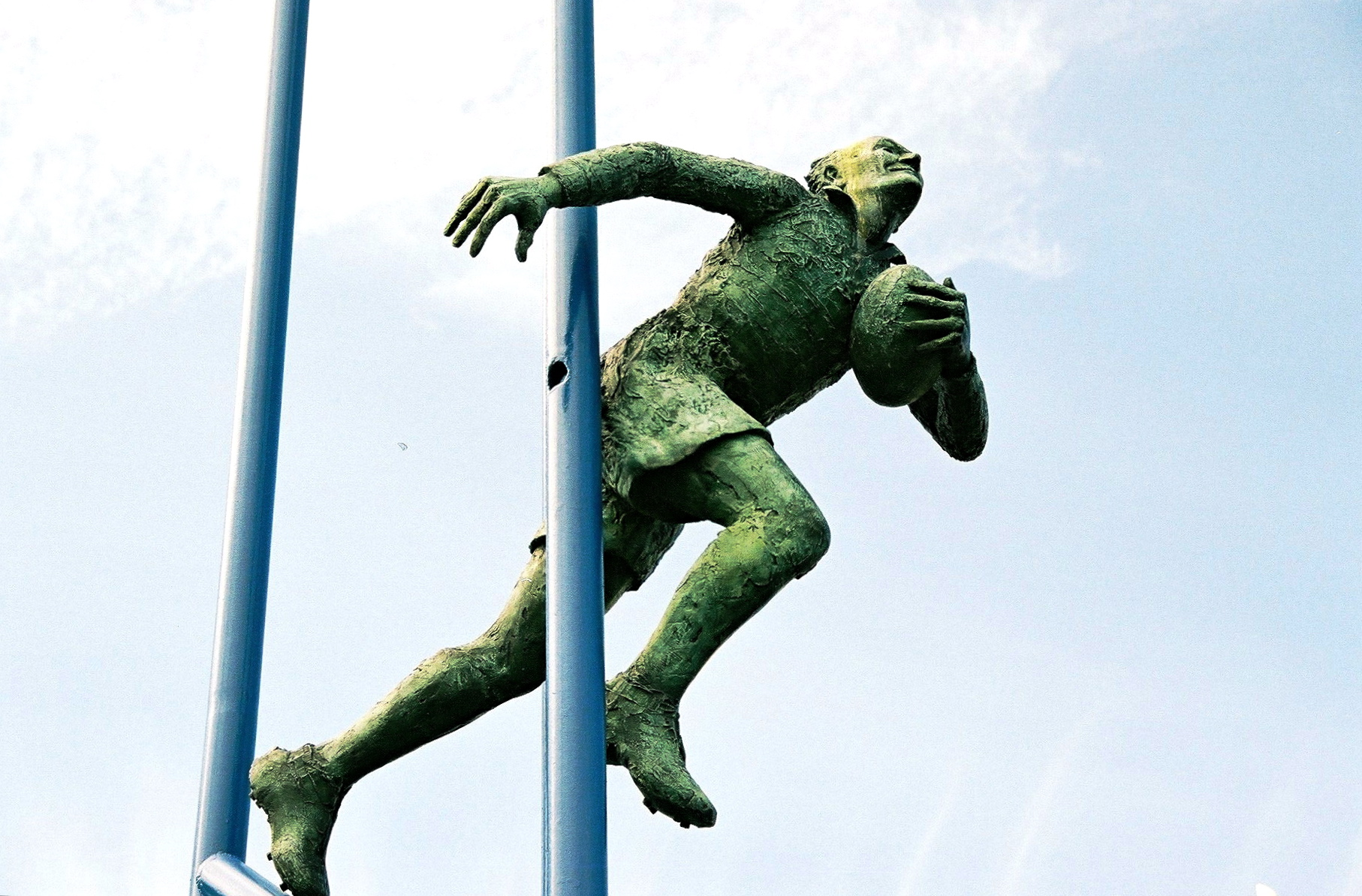
Statue of Brian Bevan at the Halliwell Jones Stadium

Bevan played his last game for Warrington on Easter Monday, 1962. In his career in Britain, Bevan scored a hat-trick of tries or more in a single game 100 times. Twice he scored seven tries in a game for Warrington, which is still a club record. During his sixteen-year career with Warrington he helped the club win the Challenge Cup twice, three RL Championships, a Lancashire Cup and six Lancashire League titles.

Bevan came out of semi-retirement to play for Blackpool Borough between 1962 and 1964.

Bevan played most of his career in Britain, and was never selected to represent Australia in a test match, although he did mesmerise Kangaroo touring sides with his guile and skill for almost two decades. In all he scored 796 tries in his career in Britain in competitive matches, a world record by a rugby player of either code). He scored 740 for Warrington, in 620 appearances (both club records).

Bevan's international try scoring average with the crack Other Nationalities team was 1.625 tries per match - the highest ever in international rugby league.

== Post-playing ==
In 1988 Brian Bevan was inducted into the British Rugby League Hall of Fame.

The 'wing wizard', as he is commonly referred, died in Southport, England in June 1991, aged 67. Thousands turned up for his memorial service a month later which was held on the pitch at Wilderspool which was at the time the home of Warrington.

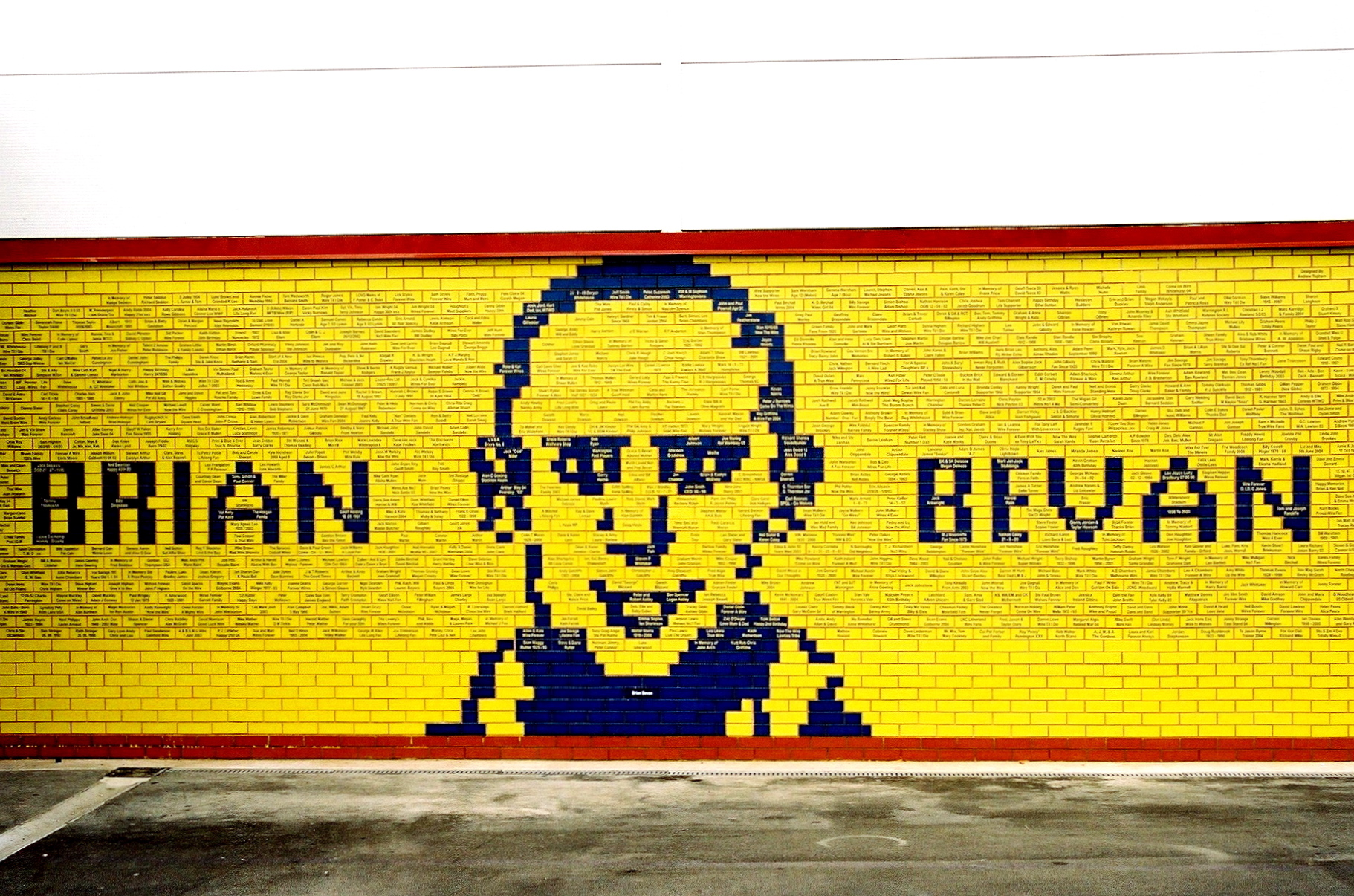
The Brian Bevan Wall at the Halliwell Jones Stadium

Bevan was featured on a British stamp in 1995, one of a series of five to commemorate the centenary of Rugby League. In September, 2005 he was also inducted into the Australian Rugby League Hall of Fame. He is the only player to have been so doubly honoured. A statue of him was erected in the middle of a roundabout close to Wilderspool Stadium, then moved to the club's new ground, the Halliwell Jones Stadium, in 2004, which also includes a mural showing Bevan's face made from primrose and blue bricks, the traditional Warrington colours. Bevan was also inducted into the Warrington Wolves Hall of Fame.

In 2004 Bevan's great nephew, Paul Bevan started playing Australian rules football in the Australian Football League for the Sydney Swans.

In February 2008, Bevan was named in a list of Australia's 100 Greatest Players (1908–2007) which was commissioned by the National Rugby League and the Australian Rugby League to celebrate the code's centenary year in Australia. Bevan went on to be named as one of the wingers, along with Ken Irvine, in Australian rugby league's Team of the Century. Announced on 17 April 2008, the team is the panel's majority choice for each of the thirteen starting positions and four interchange players.

In June 2018, Bevan was named on a shortlist of ten players for potential induction into the NRL's The Immortals, with two to be selected and announced in August of the same year. While the NRL made a surprise announcement that they were making five inductions rather than the planned two on the night, Bevan was not among those raised to Immortal status.
