= Alan Prescott =

Former Great Britain and England international rugby league footballer (1927–1998)

- Prescott in 1951

Personal information
- Born: 17 June 1927 Widnes, England
- Died: 20 September 1998 (aged 71) Wigan, England

Playing information
- Height: 5 ft 10 in (1.78 m)
- Position: Wing, Prop, Second-row, Loose forward
Club
Years	Team	Pld	T	G	FG	P
1943–49	Halifax	71	8	0	0	24
1949–60	St. Helens	404	31	0	0	93
	Total	475	39	0	0	117
Representative
Years	Team	Pld	T	G	FG	P
1950–56	England	11	0	0	0	0
1951–58	Great Britain	31	4	0	0	12

Coaching information
Club
Years	Team	Gms	W	D	L	W%
1960–61	St. Helens
1962–63	Leigh	0	0	0	0
	Total	0	0	0	0

George Alan Prescott (17 June 1927 – 20 September 1998) was an English rugby league footballer who played in the 1940s, 1950s and 1960s, and coached in the 1960s. He played initially at wing, and then later at prop, second-row or loose forward. In 404 matches for St Helens. Prescott scored 31 tries for a total of 93 points. He played 14 times for Lancashire, 12 times for England, once for Rugby League XIII, once for British Empire, and made 31 Great Britain appearances (10 as captain).

== Background ==
Prescott was born in Widnes, Lancashire, England, and he died aged 71 in Wigan, Greater Manchester, England

== Playing career ==
=== Club career ===
Prescott made his senior rugby league debut aged 16 for Halifax as a wing.

He was transferred from Halifax to St. Helens on 11 January 1949 and he made his first team début four days later against Belle Vue Rangers.

Prescott played at prop in St. Helens' 10-15 defeat by Huddersfield in the 1953 Challenge Cup Final during the 1952-53 season at Wembley Stadium, London on Saturday 25 April 1953, in front of a crowd of 89,588, He was also captain and a Lance Todd Trophy winner in the 13–2 victory over Halifax in the 1956 Challenge Cup final.

Prescott played at prop in St. Helens' 5-22 defeat by Leigh in the 1952 Lancashire Cup Final during the 1952–53 season at Station Road, Swinton on Saturday 29 November 1952, played at prop in the 16–8 victory over Wigan in the 1953 Lancashire Cup Final during the 1953–54 season at Station Road, Swinton on Saturday 24 October 1953, played at prop in the 3–10 defeat by Oldham in the 1956 Lancashire Cup Final during the 1956–57 season at Central Park, Wigan on Saturday 20 October 1956, and played at prop in the 5–4 defeat by Warrington in the 1959 Lancashire Cup Final during the 1959–60 season at Central Park, Wigan Saturday 31 October 1959.

His final appearance for St. Helens was against Halifax on 19 March 1960.

=== International honours ===
Prescott made his test début for Great Britain against Australia at Headingley in 1952. When he arrived in Australia as captain of Great Britain in 1956, he had not missed a Test against Australia since making his début. He is best remembered for leading his side to victory over Australia at Brisbane in 1958, having broken his arm after just four minutes but continuing to play. The match became known as "Prescott’s Match" or the "Battle of Brisbane".

Prescott also represented Great Britain & France in the 37–31 victory over New Zealand at Carlaw Park, Auckland on 3 July 1957.

== Coaching career ==
Prescott took over from Jim Sullivan as St Helens' coach. He coached the team to Lancashire Cup success and a Challenge Cup win over Wigan in 1961.
