= 1963–64 Kangaroo tour of Great Britain and France =

Rugby league tour (1963–1964)

- Manager: Jack Lynch; Arthur Sparkes
- Coach(es): Arthur Summons
- Tour captain(s): Arthur Summons; Ian Walsh
- Top point scorer(s): Graeme Langlands 207
- Top try scorer(s): Ken Irvine 29
- Top test point scorer(s): Graeme Langlands 49
- Top test try scorer(s): Ken Irvine 8
Summary
P	W	D	L
Total
36	28	1	7
Test match
6	4	0	2
Opponent
P	W	D	L
Great Britain
3	2	0	1
France
3	2	0	1

Tour chronology
- Previous tour: 1959-60 by 1961 by to 1961 by
- Next tour: 1965 by to 1965 by 1967-68 by

The 1963-64 Kangaroo tour was the eleventh Kangaroo tour, during which the Australian national rugby league team traveled to Europe and played thirty-six matches against British and French club and representative teams. It included three Test matches against Great Britain for The Ashes, and three Tests against the French. The tour followed the 1959-60 Kangaroo tour of Great Britain and France and was followed by the 1967-68 Kangaroo tour of Great Britain and France.

== The squad's leadership ==
The Australian team was captain-coached by Western Suburbs Magpies Halfback Arthur Summons, though due to injury to Summons the test captaincy fell to St George Hooker Ian Walsh for Ashes series against Great Britain and the first test against France.
In the five matches in which neither Summons nor Walsh played, the Kangaroos were captained by Barry Muir (against Featherstone), Ken Irvine (Rochdale), Noel Kelly (Cumberland), Reg Gasnier (Pyrenees) and Brian Hambly (Les Espoirs (French Colts)).
The team was managed by Jack Lynch and Arthur Sparkes.

== Touring squad ==
The Rugby League News published details of the touring team including each player's ages, weight, height and occupation.
Match details - listing surnames of both teams and the point scorers - were included in E.E. Christensen's Official Rugby League Yearbook, as was a summary of the players' point-scoring.
John Cleary, Ken Day, Peter Gallagher, John Gleeson and Barry Muir were selected from Queensland clubs. Earl Harrison, Paul Quinn and Barry Rushworth were selected from clubs in New South Wales Country areas. The balance of the squad had played for Sydney based clubs during the 1963 season.

Player	Position	Age	Weight st.lb (kg)	Club	Tests on Tour	Games	Tries	Goals	FG	Points
John Cleary	Prop	24	15.7 (98)	Ipswich Brothers	0	14	1	0	0	3
Michael Cleary	Wing	23	12.13 (82)	South Sydney	1	21	14	0	0	42
Ken Day	Second-row	27	15.0 (95)	Brisbane Western Suburbs	2	18	5	0	0	15
Peter Dimond	Wing	24	14.7 (92)	Western Suburbs	6	24	16	0	0	48
Peter Gallagher	Prop	26	15.6 (98)	Brisbane Brothers	3	21	2	0	0	6
Reg Gasnier	Centre	24	12.12 (82)	St George	6	19	15	0	0	45
John Gleeson	Five-eighth	22	11.10 (74)	Brisbane Brothers	0	9	3	0	0	9
Brian Hambly	Prop, Second-row	25	15.3 (97)	Parramatta	5	24	2	12	0	30
Earl Harrison	Five-eighth	22	12.7 (79)	Gilgandra	4	17	3	0	0	9
Ken Irvine	Wing	23	12.0 (76)	North Sydney	5	27	29	2	0	91
Les Johns	Fullback	21	11.11 (75)	Canterbury	0	14	3	28	1	67
Noel Kelly	Prop, Hooker	26	14.0 (89)	Western Suburbs	6	23	2	0	0	6
Graeme Langlands	Centre	21	13.0 (83)	St George	5	25	17	78	0	207
Jim Lisle	Centre	23	12.3 (78)	South Sydney	0	13	2	0	0	6
Barry Muir	Halfback	25	11.6 (73)	Brisbane Western Suburbs	6	20	5	0	0	15
Paul Quinn	Prop	25	14.10 (93)	Gerringong	3	20	1	0	0	3
Johnny Raper	Lock	24	13.9 (87)	St George	5	18	2	0	0	6
Barry Rushworth	Centre	20	12.2 (77)	Lithgow Workmen	1	19	9	0	0	27
Kevin Ryan	Second-row	28	14.10 (93)	St George	0	4	0	0	0	0
Kevin Smyth	Lock	29	13.0 (83)	Western Suburbs	2	18	4	0	0	12
Frank Stanton	Utility Back	23	11.6 (73)	Manly-Warringah	0	18	4	0	0	12
Arthur Summons	Five-eighth, Halfback	27	11.0 (70)	Western Suburbs	2	17	5	0	0	15
Ken Thornett	Fullback	25	13.9 (87)	Parramatta	6	16	3	0	0	9
Dick Thornett	Prop, Second-row	22	16.0 (102)	Parramatta	4	22	6	0	0	18
Ian Walsh	Hooker	28	13.4 (84)	St George	4	18	1	0	0	3
Graham Wilson	Prop, Second-row	23	14.12 (94)	Newtown	2	18	1	0	0	3

== Great Britain ==
The Ashes series against Great Britain saw an aggregate crowd of 65,286 attending the Test series. The largest attendance of the tour came during the Kangaroos 50-12 second test win over Great Britain at Station Road in Swinton with 30,843 in attendance. The largest non-test attendance of the tour was 21,284 when the Kangaroos defeated St. Helens at Knowsley Road.

=== Test venues ===
The three Ashes series tests took place at the following venues.

London	Swinton	Leeds
Wembley Stadium	Station Road	Headingley
Capacity: 100,000	Capacity: 40,000	Capacity: 35,000

Saturday, 14 September	Warrington	20 – 28	Australia	Wilderspool, Warrington
		[ Report]		Attendance: 20,090

Monday, 16 September	Huddersfield	5 – 6	Australia	Fartown, Huddersfield
		[ Report]		Attendance: 13,398

Wednesday, 18 September	Yorkshire	11 – 5	Australia	Craven Park, Hull
		[ Report]		Attendance: 10,324; Referee: Denis Davies

Saturday, 21 September	Leeds	10 – 13	Australia	Headingley, Leeds
		[ Report]		Attendance: 16,641

Wednesday, 25 September	Lancashire	13 – 11	Australia	Central Park, Wigan
		[ Report]		Attendance: 15,068; Referee: M. Coats

Saturday, 28 September	St. Helens	2 – 8	Australia	Knowsley Road, St. Helens
		[ Report]		Attendance: 21,284

Wednesday, 2 October	Featherstone Rovers	23 – 17	Australia	Post Office Road, Featherstone
		[ Report]		Attendance: 7,898

Saturday, 5 October	Oldham	4 – 12	Australia	Watersheddings, Oldham
		[ Report]		Attendance: 11,338

Wednesday, 9 October	Leigh	7 – 33	Australia	Hilton Park, Leigh
		[ Report]		Attendance: 9,625

Saturday, 12 October	Hull F.C. / Hull Kingston Rovers XIII	10 – 23	Australia	The Boulevard, Hull
		[ Report]		Attendance: 10,481

=== The Ashes series ===
==== First Test ====
The first Ashes series test was played at the famous Wembley Stadium in London. Reg Gasnier ran in 3 of the Kangaroos 6 tries while his St George team mate and centre partner Graeme Langlands kicked 5 goals and crossed for his own try. In front of a small crowd of only 13,946 (in a stadium which at the time could hold up to 100,000 and earlier in the year had seen a crowd of 84,488 for the Challenge Cup Final), the Kangaroos kept the Lions scoreless with Neil Fox's lone goal the only score for the home side as Australia won 28-2.

Wednesday, 16 October

Great Britain	2 – 28	Australia
Tries: Goals: Neil Fox (1)		Tries: Reg Gasnier (3); Ken Irvine; Graeme Langlands; Ken Thornett; Goals: Graeme Langlands (5)

Wembley Stadium, London
Attendance: 13,946
Referee: Denis Davies (England)
Player of the Match: Reg Gasnier

Great Britain	Position	Australia
Ken Gowers	FB	Ken Thornett
Bill Burgess	WG	Ken Irvine
Eric Ashton (c)	CE	Reg Gasnier
Neil Fox	CE	Graeme Langlands
Norman Field	WG	Peter Dimond
Dave Bolton	SO	Earl Harrison
Alex Murphy	SH	Barry Muir
John Tembey	PR	Peter Gallagher
Bill Sayer	HK	Ian Walsh (c)
Brian Tyson	PR	Noel Kelly
Jim Measures	SR	Brian Hambly
Ken Bowman	SR	Dick Thornett
Vince Karalius	LF	Johnny Raper
	Coach	Arthur Summons

Saturday, 19 October	Rochdale Hornets	0 – 3	Australia	Athletic Grounds, Rochdale
		[ Report]		Attendance: 8,637

Wednesday, 23 October	Hunslet	13 – 17	Australia	Parkside, Hunslet
		[ Report]		Attendance: 4,400

Saturday, 26 October	Wakefield Trinity	14 – 29	Australia	Belle Vue, Wakefield
		[ Report]		Attendance: 15,821

Thursday, 31 October	Cumberland (Cumbria)	0 – 21	Australia	Derwent Park, Workington
		[ Report]		Attendance: 8,229; Referee: A. Durkin

Saturday, 2 November	Barrow	5 – 18	Australia	Craven Park, Barrow
		[ Report]		Attendance: 10,130

==== Second Test ====
The second test at Station Road in Swinton has gone down in rugby league folklore as the "Swinton Massacre". The Kangaroos ran riot, crossing for 12 tries to just 2 from the Lions. The 50-12 win was not only the Kangaroos highest ever score against Great Britain, it also saw Australia win The Ashes in England for the first time since 1911–12 and the first time an all-Australian team (the 1911–12 squad included New Zealand players) had won The Ashes in England. British fans got a taste of Ken Irvine's legendary speed when he crossed for three long range tries while Reg Gasnier, Peter Dimond and Graeme Langlands all crossed for doubles with Langlands also kicking 7 goals for a personal tally of 20 points. Though on this day there was none better than Kangaroos lock forward Johnny Raper who while not scoring himself, had a hand in 9 of his teams 12 tries.

Saturday, 9 November

Great Britain	12 – 50	Australia
Tries: John Stopford; Jim Measures Goals: Neil Fox (3)		Tries: Ken Irvine (3); Reg Gasnier (2); Peter Dimond (2); Graeme Langlands (2); Earl Harrison; Noel Kelly; Dick Thornett; Goals: Graeme Langlands (7)

Station Road, Swinton
Attendance: 30,843
Referee: Denis Davies (England)
Player of the Match: Johnny Raper

Great Britain	Position	Australia
Ken Gowers	FB	Ken Thornett
Mick Sullivan	WG	Ken Irvine
Eric Ashton (c)	CE	Reg Gasnier
Neil Fox	CE	Graeme Langlands
John Stopford	WG	Peter Dimond
Frank Myler	SO	Earl Harrison
Alex Murphy	SH	Barry Muir
Bill Robinson	PR	Paul Quinn
Len McIntyre	HK	Ian Walsh (c)
Cliff Watson	PR	Noel Kelly
Jim Measures	SR	Ken Day
Ron Morgan	SR	Dick Thornett
Vince Karalius	LF	Johnny Raper
	Coach	Arthur Summons

Wednesday, 13 November	Castleford	13 – 12	Australia	Wheldon Road, Castleford
		[ Report]		Attendance: 7,887

Monday, 18 November	Wigan	10 – 18	Australia	Central Park, Wigan
		[ Report]		Attendance: 11,746

Thursday, 21 November	Widnes	9 – 20	Australia	Naughton Park, Widnes
		[ Report]		Attendance: 6,509

Saturday, 23 November	Swinton	2 – 2	Australia	Station Road, Swinton
		[ Report]		Attendance: 11,947

==== Third Test ====
With pride on the line as no England or Great Britain team had ever lost a home series 3-0 to Australia, The Lions put in a much improved performance at Headingley in Leeds. The Rugby Football League had appointed "Sergeant Major" Eric Clay as the referee for the game. The two sides set about settling scores and the Australians felt Clay was biased. It is considered was one of the most brutal Tests ever played, with two Australians (Barry Muir and Brian Hambly) and one British player (Cliff Watson) being sent off. Muir who was sent off (for kicking) later told that he first told Clay "where to go" as he left the field, and later approached Clay after the game and said to him "You robbed us". According to Muir, Clay reportedly responded with "Barry, I've got to live here".

Ken Irvine, who scored Australia's only try for the match, repeated his efforts from the 1962 Ashes series by scoring a try in each test of an Ashes series.

Saturday, 30 November

Great Britain	16 – 5	Australia
Tries: Johnny Ward; John Stopford; Geoff Smith; Don Fox; Goals: Don Fox (2)		Tries: Ken Irvine Goals: Graeme Langlands (1)

Headingley, Leeds
Attendance: 20,497
Referee: Eric Clay (England)

Great Britain	Position	Australia
1. Ken Gowers	FB	1. Ken Thornett
2. Geoff Smith	WG	3. Ken Irvine
3. Keith Holden	CE	7. Reg Gasnier
4. Alan Buckley	CE	4. Graeme Langlands
5. John Stopford	WG	5. Peter Dimond
6. Dave Bolton	SO	11. Earl Harrison
7. Tommy Smales (c)	SH	14.Barry Muir
8. Frank Collier	PR	26. Noel Kelly
9. Johnny Ward	HK	25. Ian Walsh (c)
10. Cliff Watson	PR	21. Paul Quinn
11. Dick Huddart	SR	20. Brian Hambly
12. Ken Roberts	SR	18. Dick Thornett
13. Don Fox	LF	15. Johnny Raper
	Coach	Arthur Summons

== France ==
The Rugby League News published a list of match results in a February 1964 special issue.

Date	Opponent	Score	Ground	Referee	Crowd	Report
5 December 1963	Celtic de Paris	2 – 30	Stade Pershing, Paris		200	
8 December 1963	France	8 – 5	Stade Chaban-Delmas, Bordeaux	A. Cassan (FRA)	4,261	
12 December 1963	Basque / Bearnaise XIII	5 – 18			4,261	
15 December 1963	South West France	11 – 41	Stade Jules Ribet, Saint-Gaudens		1,266	
19 December 1963	Pyrenees	10 – 14	Stade Jules Ribet, Saint-Gaudens		2,059	
22 December 1963	France	10 – 14	Stade des Minimes, Toulouse	E. Martung (FRA)	6,932	
25 December 1963	Rouergue XIII	2 – 13	Stade Municipal d'Albi, Albi		3,780	
29 December 1963	Languedoc XIII	12 – 16	Stade Albert Domec, Carcassonne		6,143	
4 January 1963	XIII Catalan	15 – 11	Stade Jean-Laffon, Perpignan		4,524	
4 January 1964	South France	11 – 51			889	
5 January 1964	Provence XIII	4 – 35	Parc des Sports, Avignon		2,009	
12 January 1964	Roanne XIII	2 – 38			2,969	
16 January 1964	Les Espoirs (Colts)	12 – 19			2,617	
18 January 1964	France	8 – 16	Parc des Princes, Paris	G. Jameau (FRA)	5,979	

=== French Tests ===
==== First test ====
Although Ken Irvine was unavailable due to injury, The Kangaroos lost nothing with pace on the wing due to the selection of South Sydney flyer and dual-rugby international Michael Cleary who 12 months earlier had won the Bronze Medal in the 100 yards sprint at the 1962 Commonwealth Games. However it wasn't enough as the tourists were defeated 8-5 by a determined French.

8 December 1963

France	8 – 5	Australia
Tries: Georges Ailleres; Bernard Fabre; Goals; Jean Villeneuve (1)		Tries: Graeme Langlands Goals; Graeme Langlands (1)

Stade Chaban-Delmas, Bordeaux
Attendance: 4,261
Referee: A. Cassan (France)

France	Position	Australia
André Carrère	FB	Ken Thornett
Jean Etcheberry	WG	Michael Cleary
Bernard Fabre	CE	Graeme Langlands
Claude Mantoulan	CE	Reg Gasnier
Laurent Roldos	WG	Peter Dimond
Jean Villeneuve	SO	Earl Harrison
Georges Fages (c)	SH	Barry Muir
Laurent Faletti	PR	Noel Kelly
Jean Graciet	HK	Ian Walsh (c)
Jean Panno	PR	Paul Quinn
Henri Marracq	SR	Brian Hambly
Georges Ailleres	SR	Dick Thornett
André Lacaze	LF	Johnny Raper
Jean Capdouze	Int.|
	Coach	Arthur Summons

==== Second Test ====
22 December 1963

France	9 – 21	Australia
Tries: Jean Etcheberry Goals; Jean Villeneuve (2); Andre Lacaze (1)		Tries: Ken Irvine (2); Graeme Langlands; Arthur Summons; Ken Thornett; Goals; Graeme Langlands (3)

Stade des Minimes, Toulouse
Attendance: 6,932
Referee: Eddie Martung (France)

France	Position	Australia
André Carrère	FB	Ken Thornett
Jean Etcheberry	WG	Ken Irvine
Bernard Fabre	CE	Graeme Langlands
Claude Mantoulan	CE	Reg Gasnier
Laurent Roldos	WG	Peter Dimond
Jean Villeneuve	SO	Arthur Summons (c)
Georges Fages (c)	SH	Barry Muir
Laurent Faletti	PR
Jean Graciet	HK	Noel Kelly
Jean Panno	PR	Peter Gallagher
Henri Marracq	SR	Kevin Smyth
Georges Ailleres	SR	Dick Thornett
André Lacaze	LF	Johnny Raper
	Coach	Arthur Summons

==== Third Test ====
18 January 1964

France	8 – 16	Australia
Tries: Laurent Roldos; Louis Vergé Goals; Jean Villeneuve (1)		Tries: Barry Muir (2); Ken Irvine; Barry Rushworth; Goals; Brian Hambly (1)

Parc des Princes, Paris
Attendance: 5,979
Referee: Georges Jameau (France)

France	Position	Australia
André Carrère	FB	Ken Thornett
Laurent Roldos	WG	Ken Irvine
Bernard Fabre	CE	Reg Gasnier
Gilbert Benausse	CE	Barry Rushworth
Daniel Pellerin	WG	Peter Dimond
Jean Villeneuve	SO	Arthur Summons (c)
Louis Vergé	SH	Barry Muir
Laurent Faletti	PR	Brian Hambly
Jean Graciet	HK	Noel Kelly
Jean Panno	PR	Peter Gallagher
Hervé Larrue	SR	Graham Wilson
Henri Marracq	SR	Ken Day
Jean Barthe	LF	Kevin Smyth
	Coach	Arthur Summons
