= William Morgan =

William Morgan may refer to:

== Arts and entertainment ==
- William De Morgan (1839–1917), pottery and tile designer in Britain
- William Morgan (director) (1899–1964), English film director and editor
- William Michael Morgan (born 1993), American country music singer
- William Evan Charles Morgan, artist, etcher and engraver
- Bill Morgan (archivist) (William Albert Morgan, born 1949), American archivist and bibliographer
- Bill Morgan (producer) (William John Morgan, 1940–2020), Australian Canadian journalist and television producer

== Military ==
- William H. Morgan (1831–?), American general
- William Morgan (British Army officer) (1891–1977), general in the British Army after whom the Morgan Line was named
- William J. Morgan (historian) (1917–2003), historian at the U.S. Naval Historical Center and editor of Naval Documents of the American Revolution
- William Alexander Morgan (1928–1961), American who fought in the Cuban Revolution
- William B. Morgan, American naval architect
- William D. Morgan (1947–1969), Medal of Honor recipient, U.S. Marine killed in action in Vietnam

== Politics ==
=== United Kingdom ===
- William Morgan (died 1602), member of parliament (MP) for Haslemere
- William Morgan (died 1569), MP for Monmouthshire
- William Morgan (died 1582), MP for Monmouthshire
- William Morgan (died 1583) (1542–1583), MP for Monmouth Boroughs
- William Morgan (of Tredegar) (1560–1653), Welsh politician
- William Morgan (of Rhymny), Welsh politician
- William Morgan (of Dderw) (died 1649), Welsh lawyer and politician
- William Morgan (of Machen and Tredegar) (c. 1640–1680), MP for Monmouthshire 1659–1680
- Sir William Morgan (of Tredegar, elder) (1700–1731), MP for Brecon, 1722–1723, and Monmouthshire, 1722–1731
- William Morgan (of Tredegar, younger) (1725–1763), MP for Monmouthshire, 1747–1763
- William Morgan (abolitionist) (1815–c. 1890), town clerk in Birmingham, England
- William Pritchard Morgan (1844–1924), British MP for Merthyr Tydfil, 1888–1900
- W. E. Morgan (William Evan Morgan, 1858–1916), Welsh trade union leader
- William James Morgan (1914–1999), Irish politician

=== United States ===
- William S. Morgan (1801–1878), U.S. representative from Virginia
- William Duane Morgan (1817–1887), American newspaper editor and politician
- William Augustine Morgan (1831-1899), Virginia planter, Confederate cavalry officer, early West Virginia politician
- William J. Morgan (New York politician) (1840–1900), New York State comptroller, 1899–1900
- William Albert Morgan (1841–1917), Irish-American newspaper publisher and politician
- William Yoast Morgan (1866–1932), lieutenant governor of Kansas
- William McKendree Morgan (1869–1942), Idaho lawyer and politician
- William M. Morgan (Ohio politician) (1870–1935), U.S. representative from Ohio
- William J. Morgan (Wisconsin politician) (1883–1983), Wisconsin attorney general
- William Fellowes Morgan Jr. (1889–1977), president of the Middle Atlantic Oyster Fisheries, and later Commissioner of Public Markets for New York City
- Will Morgan (born 1966), member of the Minnesota House of Representatives

=== Other politicians ===
- William Morgan (South Australian politician) (1828–1883), premier of South Australia, 1878–1881
- William Morgan (New South Wales politician) (1842–1907), member of the New South Wales Legislative Assembly, 1894–1901
- William Morgan (Canadian politician) (1848–after 1890), politician in Ontario, Canada
- William Morgan (New Zealand politician) (1851–1918), member of the New Zealand Legislative Council

== Science and medicine ==
- William Morgan (cartographer) (died 1690), English cartographer
- William Morgan (actuary) (1750–1833), Welsh scientist and actuary who won the Copley Medal in 1789
- William Fellowes Morgan Sr. (1861–1943), president of the National Association for the Prevention of Blindness
- William Wilson Morgan (1906–1994), American astronomer
- W. Jason Morgan (1935–2023), American geophysicist
- G. William Morgan (died 1984), American health physicist
- William Morgan (Navajo scholar) (1917-2001), Navajo linguist

== Sports ==
- William Morgan (cricketer, born 1862) (1862–1914), Welsh cricketer
- William Morgan (cricketer, born 1864) (1864–1934), English cricketer
- William G. Morgan (1870–1942), American inventor of the game of volleyball
- William Llewellyn Morgan (1884–1960), Welsh international rugby union player
- Bill Morgan (rugby) (William Morgan), Welsh rugby union and rugby league player
- William A. Morgan (footballer) (1914–?), English footballer who played as goalkeeper for Coventry City F.C.
- William Morgan (rugby league), rugby league footballer of the 1930s for Wales, and Wigan
- Sack Morgan (William Lee Morgan), American baseball player
- Jimmy Morgan (William James Morgan, 1922–1975), English footballer and Royal Marines commando
- Willie Morgan (born 1944), Scottish footballer
- William Morgan (judoka) (born 1975), Canadian Paralympic judo competitor
- Bill Morgan (outfielder/shortstop) (William Morgan, 1856–1908), American baseball outfielder, shortstop and catcher
- Billy Morgan (Gaelic footballer) (William Morgan, born 1945), Irish Gaelic football manager and goalkeeper
- Billy Morgan (footballer, born 1878) (William Henry Morgan, 1878–1939), English footballer
- Billy Morgan (footballer, born 1891) (William Albert L. Morgan, 1891–?), English footballer
- Billy Morgan (footballer, born 1896) (William Morgan, 1896–1993), English footballer

== Others ==
- William Morgan (Bible translator) (1545–1604), Welsh translator of the Bible
- William Morgan (anti-Mason) (1774–1826?), New York businessman whose book on Freemasonry and subsequent disappearance sparked the U.S. anti-Masonic movement
- William Morgan (1782–1858), Welsh evangelical cleric in Bradford
- William Morgan (architect) (1930–2016), American architect and author
- William Edward Thomas Morgan (1847–1940), Welsh Anglican priest

== See also ==
- William Morgan Butler (1861–1937), U.S. political figure in the 1920s
- Bill Morgan (disambiguation)
- Billy Morgan (disambiguation)
- Morgan (surname)
