= Bill Morgan =

Bill Morgan may refer to:

- Bill Morgan (outfielder/shortstop) (1856–1908), baseball player for the Pittsburgh Alleghenys and Washington Nationals
- Bill Morgan (outfielder/catcher) (1857–1938), baseball player for the Pittsburgh Alleghenys, Richmond Virginians and Baltimore Monumentals
- Bill Morgan (American football) (1910–1985), American football player
- Bill Morgan (footballer, born 1926) (1926-2007), English footballer, see List of Rochdale A.F.C. players (25–99 appearances)
- Bill Morgan (judoka) (born 1975), Canadian judoka and three-time Paralympian
- Bill Morgan (producer) (1940–2020), CBC television producer
- Bill Morgan (archivist), associated with the Beat literary movement
- Bill Morgan (rugby), Welsh rugby union and rugby league footballer of the 1920s and 1930s
- Bill Morgan (lottery winner), an Australian who won the lottery for a second time while re-enacting his first win

== See also ==
- William Morgan (disambiguation)
- Billy Morgan (disambiguation)
