= Albert Blan =

Former England international rugby league footballer (1930–2015)

Personal information
- Full name: Albert Blan
- Born: 13 January 1930 Wigan, Lancashire, England
- Died: 27 September 2015 (aged 85) Chorley, Lancashire, England

Playing information
- Position: Fullback, Centre, Stand-off, Loose forward
Club
Years	Team	Pld	T	G	FG	P
1949–64	Swinton	447	75	744	0	1713
Representative
Years	Team	Pld	T	G	FG	P
1953	England	1	0	0	0	0
1953–61	Lancashire	5	3	12	0	33

Coaching information
Club
Years	Team	Gms	W	D	L	W%
1968–71	Swinton RLFC	0	0	0	0
- Relatives: Billy Blan (brother)

Albert Blan (13 January 1930 – 27 September 2015) was an English professional rugby league footballer who played in the 1940s, 1950s and 1960s, and coached in the 1960s and 1970s. He played at representative level for England, and at club level for Wigan (A-Team) and Swinton, and coached at club level for Swinton. Blan was the Lions' astute captain during much of his service with the club leading them to their two successive First Division Championships of 1962–63 and 1963–64. Blan was also a skilled place kicker whether a penalty or a conversion. Initially a fullback, until the late 1950s he usually played in the Centre, but as he lost pace he successfully moved to loose forward, where his leadership and notable quick thinking football brain sparked off many a try scoring movement. Many Swinton fans often referred to him as "Brainy Blan", and with very good reason.

== Playing career ==
=== Swinton ===
Blan played his first game for Swinton in 1949. He was captain in Swinton's victory in the Lancashire League during the 1960–61 season.

Blan played loose forward, and was captain in Swinton's 9–15 defeat by St. Helens in the 1960 Lancashire Cup Final during the 1960–61 season at Central Park, Wigan on Saturday 29 October 1960, played loose forward, and was captain in the 9–25 defeat by St Helens in the 1961 Lancashire Cup Final during the 1961–62 season at Central Park, Wigan on Saturday 11 November 1961, and played loose forward, and was captain in the 4–7 defeat by St Helens in the 1962 Lancashire Cup Final during the 1962–63 season at Central Park, Wigan on Saturday 27 October 1962.

Blan played, and was captain in Swinton's victories in the Championship during the 1962–63 season, and the 1963–64 season. These were also the only two seasons between the 1905–06 season, and the 1972–73 season in which a playoff wasn't used to determine the Championship winners.

=== International honours ===
Blan won a cap for England while at Swinton in 1953 against France.

== Coaching career ==
In the late 1960s/early 1970s Albert Blan coached Swinton, including an 11–2 victory over Leigh in the 1969 Lancashire Cup Final during the 1969–70 season at Central Park, Wigan on Saturday 1 November 1969, an achievement which alluded him as team captain in the three finals against St. Helens in consecutive seasons, 1960–61, 1961–62 and 1962–63.

== Personal life ==
Blan was the younger brother of both Wigan and Salford rugby league loose forward; Jackie Blan and rugby league footballer; Billy Blan.

== Death ==
Blan died in Chorley Hospital on Sunday, 27 September 2015 aged 85 years.
