= Peter Norburn =

England international rugby league footballer

Personal information
- Born: 31 December 1930 Wigan, Lancashire, England
- Died: 6 June 2017 (aged 86) Pendleton, Salford, England

Playing information
- Position: Wing, Second-row
Club
Years	Team	Pld	T	G	FG	P
1950–64	Swinton	440	166	0	0	498
1964–≥64	Salford
	Total	440	166	0	0	498
Representative
Years	Team	Pld	T	G	FG	P
1953–61	Lancashire	4	1	0	0	3
1958	English League XIII	1
1953	England	1	4	0	0	12

Peter Norburn (31 December 1930 – 6 June 2017) was an English extra (actor), window cleaner and professional rugby league footballer who played in the 1950s and 1960s. He played at representative level for England, English League XIII, and Lancashire, and at club level for Worsley Boys Club ARLFC, Swinton, and Salford, as a wing or second-row.

== Playing career ==
=== International honours ===
Peter Norburn played at second-row for English League XIII while at Swinton in the 19-8 victory over France at Headingley, Leeds on Wednesday 16 April 1958, and won a cap playing on the wing and scored four tries for England while at Swinton in the 30-22 victory over Other Nationalities at Central Park, Wigan on Saturday 28 November 1953, equalling the England national team's record for the most tries by an individual in a match.

=== Championship appearances ===
Peter Norburn played in Swinton's victories in the Championship during the 1962-63 season, and the 1963-64 season. These were also the only two seasons between the 1905–06 season, and the 1972–73 season in which a playoff wasn't used to determine the Championship winners.

=== County league appearances ===
Peter Norburn played in Swinton's victory in the Lancashire County league during the 1960–61 season.

=== County Cup Final appearances ===
Peter Norburn played at second-row in Swinton's 9-15 defeat by St. Helens in the 1960 Lancashire Cup Final during the 1960–61 season at Central Park, Wigan on Saturday 29 October 1960, played at second-row in the 9-25 defeat by St. Helens in the 1961 Lancashire Cup Final during the 1961–62 season at Central Park, Wigan on Saturday 11 November 1961, and played at second-row in 4-7 defeat by St. Helens in the 1962 Lancashire Cup Final during the 1962–63 season at Central Park, Wigan on Saturday 27 October 1962.

=== Notable tour matches ===
Peter Norburn played in Swinton's match against Australia during the 1952–53 Kangaroo tour of Great Britain and France, played in the 24-25 defeat by Australia in the 1959–60 Kangaroo tour match at Station Road, Swinton on Wednesday 25 November 1959, and played in the 2-2 draw with Australia in the 1963–64 Kangaroo tour of Great Britain and France match at Station Road, Swinton on Saturday 23 November 1963.

=== Playing career ===
Peter Norburn made his début for Swinton against Workington Town on Saturday 26 August 1950, and he played his last match for Swinton in the 10-7 victory over St. Helens at Station Road, Swinton on Monday 30 March 1964.

== Outside of rugby league ==
Peter Norburn was an extra (actor) in television programmes such as; Coronation Street and Z-Cars.

== Death and funeral ==
Peter Norburn's funeral took place at Peel Green Crematorium, M30 7LW, at 2.20pm on Thursday 15 June 2017.
