= Earl Harrison =

Earl Harrison may refer to:

- Earl G. Harrison (1899–1955), American attorney, academician and public servant
- Earl Harrison (baseball) (1900–?), American Negro leagues baseball player
- Earl Harrison (basketball) (born 1961), retired American basketball player
- Earl Harrison (rugby league), Australian rugby league footballer
