= John Stopford (rugby league) =

English RL coach and former GB international rugby league footballer

Personal information
- Full name: John Stopford
- Born: 23 August 1936; Wigan, England
- Died: 21 August 1998 (aged 61); Wigan, England

Playing information
- Position: Wing
Club
Years	Team	Pld	T	G	FG	P
1958–69	Swinton	298	195	1	0	587
1969–71	Blackpool Borough	12	3	3	0	15
	Total	310	198	4	0	602
Representative
Years	Team	Pld	T	G	FG	P
1961–66	Great Britain	12	7	0	0	21
1963–65	Lancashire	5	1	0	0	3

Coaching information
Club
Years	Team	Gms	W	D	L	W%
1976–77	Swinton
Representative
Years	Team	Gms	W	D	L	W%
early-1980s	Wellington

John "Johnny" Stopford (23 August 1936 – 21 August 1998) was an English professional rugby league footballer who played in the 1950s and 1960s, and coached in the 1970s and 1980s. He played at representative level for Great Britain, and at club level for Swinton, as a wing. Stopford formed a highly successful wing partnership with his centre, and fellow Great Britain international, Alan Buckley. He coached at representative level for Wellington and at club level for Swinton.

== Background ==
Stopford was born in Wigan, Lancashire, England, and he died aged 61 in Wigan.

== Playing career ==
=== International honours ===
Stopford won caps for Great Britain while at Swinton in 1961 against France, in 1963 against France and Australia (two matches), in 1964 against France (two matches), in 1965 against France, and New Zealand (two matches), and in 1966 against France (two matches), and on the 1966 Great Britain Lions tour against Australia.

Four Swinton players took part in the 1966 Great Britain Lions tour to Australasia, Stopford, Buckley, Ken Gowers (vice-captain) and Dave Robinson.

=== Career records ===
Stopford holds Swinton's "Most Tries in a rugby league Season" record, with 42 tries scored during the 1963–64 season. However, Jim Valentine holds Swinton's "Most Tries in a rugby union Season" record, with 48 tries scored during the 1888–89 season.
