= 1960–61 Lancashire Cup =

- Structure: Regional knockout championship
- Teams: 14
- Winners: St. Helens
- Runners-up: Swinton

1960–61 was the forty-eighth occasion on which the Lancashire Cup completion had been held.
St. Helens won the trophy by beating Swinton by the score of 15-9
The match was played at Central Park, Wigan, (historically in the county of Lancashire). The attendance was 31,755 and receipts were £5,337.
This was the first of what, unknown to St. Helens, were to be five consecutive Lancashire Cup final triumphs, and what is more, the first of seven victories in a period of nine successive seasons.
It was also to be the first of three successive Lancashire Cup final runner-up spots for Swinton

== Background ==
With again no invitation to a junior club this season, the total number of teams entering the competition remained the same at 14.
The same fixture format was retained, and due to the number of clubs this resulted in no bye but one “blank” or “dummy” fixture in the first round, and one bye in the second round

== Competition and results ==
=== Round 1 ===
Involved 7 matches (with no bye but one “blank” fixture) and 14 clubs

Game No	Fixture date	Home team	Score	Away team	Venue	Att	Rec	Notes	Ref
1	Saturday 27 August 1960	Barrow	6-10	Swinton	Craven Park				
2	Saturday 27 August 1960	Widnes	17-19	St. Helens	Naughton Park	9,500			
3	Saturday 27 August 1960	Wigan	19-5	Oldham	Central Park				
4	Saturday 27 August 1960	Salford	11-3	Rochdale Hornets	The Willows				
5	Saturday 27 August 1960	Leigh	37-15	Workington Town	Hilton Park				
6	Saturday 27 August 1960	Liverpool City	10-29	Warrington	Mill Yard, Knotty Ash				
7	Saturday 27 August 1960	Blackpool Borough	15-5	Whitehaven	St Anne's Road Greyhound Stadium				
8		blank		blank					

=== Round 2 - quarterfinals ===
Involved 3 matches (with one bye) and 7 clubs

Game No	Fixture date	Home team	Score	Away team	Venue	Att	Rec	Notes	Ref
1	Tuesday 6 September 1960	Warrington	8-9	Leigh	Wilderspool				
2	Wednesday 7 September 1960	St. Helens	7-4	Wigan	Knowsley Road	27,000			
3	Wednesday 7 September 1960	Salford	6-9	Swinton	The Willows	8,000			
4		Blackpool Borough		bye					

=== Round 3 – semifinals ===
Involved 2 matches and 4 clubs

Game No	Fixture date	Home team	Score	Away team	Venue	Att	Rec	Notes	Ref
1	Wednesday 5 October 1960	Blackpool Borough	0-10	Swinton	St Anne's Road Greyhound Stadium				
2	Monday 17 October 1960	Leigh	2-15	St. Helens	Knowsley Road	14,500			

=== Final ===
Game No	Fixture date	Home team	Score	Away team	Venue	Att	Rec	Notes	Ref
	Saturday 29 October 1960	St. Helens	15-9	Swinton	Central Park	31,755	£5,337	1	

==== Teams and scorers ====
St. Helens	№	Swinton
	teams	
Percy Landsberg	1	Ken Gowers
Tom van Vollenhoven	2	John Speed
Ken Large	3	Peter Smethurst
Brian McGinn	4	Alan Buckley
Jan Prinsloo	5	Ken McGregor
Austin Rhodes	6	George Parkinson
Alex Murphy	7	Tony Dyson
Abe Terry	8	Bill Bretherton
Bob Dagnall	9	Trevor Roberts
Fred Leyland	10	Dai Moses
Don Vines	11	Ken Roberts
Dick Huddart	12	Peter Norburn
Vince Karalius (c)	13	Albert Blan (c)
15	score	9
8	HT	2
	Scorers	
	Tries	
Austin Rhodes (1)	T	Ken McGregor (1)
Tom van Vollenhoven (1)	T	
Ken Large (1)	T	
	Goals	
Austin Rhodes (3)	G	Albert Blan (3)
	G	
	Drop Goals	
	DG	
Referee		E. Clay (Leeds)

Scoring - Try = three (3) points - Goal = two (2) points - Drop goal = two (2) points

=== The road to success ===
First round
Liverpool City	10
Warrington	29
Leigh	37
Workington Town	15
Widnes	17
St. Helens	19
Wigan	19
Oldham	5
Blackpool Borough	15
Whitehaven	5
blank
blank
Salford	11
Rochdale Hornets	3
Barrow	6
Swinton	10

Second round
Warrington	8
Leigh	9
St. Helens	7
Wigan	4
Blackpool Borough
bye
Salford	6
Swinton	9

Semifinals
Leigh	2
St. Helens	15
Blackpool Borough	0
Swinton	10

Final
St. Helens	15
Swinton	9

== Notes and comments ==
1 * Central Park was the home ground of Wigan with a final capacity of 18,000, although the record attendance was 47,747 for Wigan v St Helens 27 March 1959

== See also ==
- 1960–61 Northern Rugby Football League season
- Rugby league county cups
