= 1972–73 Lancashire Cup =

- Structure: Regional knockout championship
- Teams: 14
- Winners: Salford
- Runners-up: Swinton

The 1972–73 Lancashire Cup was the sixtieth occasion on which the competition was held. Salford won the trophy by beating Swinton by the score of 25–11 in the final. The match was played at Wilderspool, Warrington, (historically in the county of Lancashire). The attendance was 6,865 and receipts were £3,321.00

== Background ==
The total number of teams entering the competition remained at last season's total of 14 with no junior/amateur clubs taking part.
The same fixture format was retained, but due to the decrease in the number of participating clubs, resulted in one "blank" or "dummy" fixtures in the first round, and one bye in the second round.

== Competition and results ==
=== Round 1 ===
Involved 7 matches (with one "blank" fixture) and 14 clubs

Game No	Fixture date	Home team	Score	Away team	Venue	Att	Rec	Notes	Fixture date	Home team	Ref
1	Fri 1 September 1972	Salford	41-17	Oldham	The Willows						
2	Fri 1 September 1972	Wigan	15-7	Workington Town	Central Park						
3	Sun 3 September 1972	Huyton	12-18	Barrow	Alt Park, Huyton						
4	Sun 3 September 1972	Leigh	6-20	Widnes	Hilton Park						
5	Sun 3 September 1972	Swinton	28-25	Blackpool Borough	Station Road						
6	Sun 3 September 1972	Warrington	16-18	St. Helens	Wilderspool	8,500					
7	Sun 3 September 1972	Whitehaven	19-24	Rochdale Hornets	Recreation Ground						
8		blank		blank							

=== Round 2 - Quarter-finals ===
Involved 3 matches (with one bye) and 7 clubs

Game No	Fixture date	Home team	Score	Away team	Venue	Att	Rec	Notes	Ref
1	Wed 13 September 1972	Widnes	11-2	St. Helens	Naughton Park	9,000		1	
2	Fri 15 September 1972	Barrow	4-7	Swinton	Craven Park				
3	Fri 15 September 1972	Salford	46-13	Rochdale Hornets	The Willows				
4		Wigan		bye					

=== Round 3 – Semi-finals ===
Involved 2 matches and 4 clubs

Game No	Fixture date	Home team	Score	Away team	Venue	Att	Rec	Notes	Ref
1	Thu 5 October 1972	Widnes	4-13	Swinton	Naughton Park				
2	Thu 6 October 1972	Wigan	2-14	Salford	Central Park				

=== Final ===
Game No	Fixture date	Home team	Score	Away team	Venue	Att	Rec	Notes	Ref
	Saturday 21 October 1972	Salford	25-11	Swinton	Wilderspool	6,865	3,321	2	

==== Teams and scorers ====
Salford	No.	Swinton
	Teams	
Paul Charlton	1	Paul Jackson
Phil Eastham	2	Bob Fleay
David Watkins	3	John Cooke
Chris Hesketh	4	Alan Buckley
Maurice Richards	5	John Gomersall
Ken Gill	6	Peter Kenny
Peter Banner	7	Ken Gowers
Graham Mackay	8	Albert Halsall
Peter Walker	9	Dick Evans
Johnny Ward	10	Harold Bate
Stuart Whitehead	11	Rod Smith
Colin Dixon	12	Granville Hoyle
Eric Prescott	13	Bill Pattinson
	Subs	
Paul Orr	14	Mick Philbin (for Peter Kenny)
Doug Davies	15	Bill Holliday (for Rod Smith)
Cliff Evans	Coach	Dave Mortimer
25	score	11
10	HT	4
	Scorers	
	Tries	
Peter Banner (1)	T	Bob Fleay (1)
Eastham (1)	T	
David Watkins (1)	T	
Maurice Richards (1)	T	
Paul Charlton (1)	T	
	Goals	
David Watkins (5)	G	Ken Gowers (3)
	Drop Goals	
	DG	Peter Kenny (1)
Referee		W. "Billy" H. Thompson (Huddersfield)

Scoring - Try = three (3) points - Goal = two (2) points - Drop goal = two (2) points

=== The road to success ===
First round
Wigan	15
Workington Town	7
blank
blank
Salford	41
Oldham	17
Whitehaven	19
Rochdale Hornets	24
Leigh	6
Widnes	20
Warrington	16
St. Helens	18
Huyton	12
Barrow	18
Swinton	28
Blackpool Borough	25

Second round
Wigan
bye
Salford	46
Rochdale Hornets	13
Widnes	11
St. Helens	2
Barrow	4
Swinton	7

Semi-finals
Wigan	2
Salford	14
Widnes	4
Swinton	13

Final
Salford	25
Swinton	11

== Notes and comments ==
1 * The score of 13-2 is shows in the official St. Helens archives and also in the official Widnes archives . RUGBYLEAGUEproject shows the score as being 11–2
2 * Wilderspool was the home ground of Warrington from 1883 to the end of the 2003 Summer season when they moved into the new purpose-built Halliwell Jones Stadium. Wilderspool remained as a sports/Ruugby League ground and is/was used by Woolston Rovers/Warrington Wizards junior club.
The ground had a final capacity of 9,000 although the record attendance was set in a Challenge cup third round match on 13 March 1948 when 34,304 spectators saw Warrington lose to Wigan 10–13.

== See also ==
- British rugby league system
- 1972–73 Northern Rugby Football League season
- Rugby league county cups
- List of defunct rugby league clubs
