= 1963–64 Lancashire Cup =

- Structure: Regional knockout championship
- Teams: 14
- Winners: St. Helens
- Runners-up: Leigh

1963–64 was the fifty-first occasion on which the Lancashire Cup completion had been held.

St. Helens won the trophy by beating Leigh by the score of 15-4

The match was played at Station Road, Pendlebury (historically in the county of Lancashire). The attendance was 21,231 and receipts were £3,857

This was the fourth of five consecutive Lancashire Cup final wins for St. Helens, and what is more, the fourth of the seven occasions on which the club will win the trophy in the nine-year period.

== Background ==
With again no invitation to a junior club this season, the total number of teams entering the competition remained the same at 14.

The same fixture format was retained, and due to the number of clubs this resulted in no bye but one “blank” or “dummy” fixture in the first round, and one bye in the second round

== Competition and results ==
=== Round 1 ===
Involved 7 matches (with no bye but one “blank” fixture) and 14 clubs

Game No	Fixture date	Home team	Score	Away team	Venue	Att	Rec	Notes	Ref
1	Sat 07 Sep 1963	Barrow	12-34	Wigan	Craven Park				
2	Sat 07 Sep 1963	Blackpool Borough	8-22	Workington Town	Borough Park			1	
3	Sat 07 Sep 1963	Liverpool City	5-5	Whitehaven	Mill Yard, Knotty Ash				
4	Sat 07 Sep 1963	Oldham	10-5	Widnes	Watersheddings				
5	Sat 07 Sep 1963	Rochdale Hornets	7-19	Leigh	Athletic Grounds				
6	Sat 07 Sep 1963	Salford	0-31	Warrington	The Willows				
7	Sat 07 Sep 1963	Swinton	2-12	St. Helens	Station Road	15,474			
8		blank		blank	Recreation Ground				

=== Round 1 - replays ===
Involved 1 match

Game No	Fixture date	Home team	Score	Away team	Venue	Att	Rec	Notes	Ref
1	Wed 11 Sep 1963	Whitehaven	31-5	Liverpool City	Recreation Ground				

=== Round 2 - Quarter-finals ===
Involved 3 matches (with one bye) and 7 clubs

Game No	Fixture date	Home team	Score	Away team	Venue	Att	Rec	Notes	Ref
1	Mon 16 Sep 1963	St. Helens	28-4	Workington Town	Knowsley Road	15,700			
2	Wed 18 Sep 1963	Oldham	35-4	Whitehaven	Watersheddings				
3	Wed 18 Sep 1963	Wigan	5-7	Leigh	Central Park				
4		Warrington		bye					

=== Round 3 – Semi-finals ===
Involved 2 matches and 4 clubs

Game No	Fixture date	Home team	Score	Away team	Venue	Att	Rec	Notes	Ref
1	Mon 23 Sep 1963	Warrington	14-21	St. Helens	Wilderspool	20,168			
2	Mon 30 Sep 1963	Leigh	10-0	Oldham	Hilton Park				

=== Final ===
Game No	Fixture date	Home team	Score	Away team	Venue	Att	Rec	Notes	Ref
	Saturday 26 October 1963	St. Helens	15-4	Leigh	Station Road	21,231	£3,857	2	

==== Teams and scorers ====
St. Helens	No.	Leigh
	teams	
Kel Coslett	1	Bev Risman
Len Killeen	2	Colin Tyrer
Tom van Vollenhoven	3	Gordon Lewis
Keith Northey	4	Mick Collins
Peter Harvey	5	Tony Leadbetter
Wilf Smith	6	Austin Rhodes
Alex Murphy	7	Terry Entwistle
John Tembey	8	Bill Robinson
Bob Dagnall	9	John Lewis
Cliff Watson	10	Stan Owen
Ray French	11	Mick Murphy
Keith Ashcroft	12	Mick Martyn
Bill Major	13	Derek Hurt
15	score	4
5	HT	4
	Scorers	
	Tries	
Len Kileen (1)	T	
Tom van Vollenhoven (1)	T	
Wilf Smith (1)	T	
	Goals	
Kel Coslett (3)	G	Colin Tyrer (2)
	G	
	Drop Goals	
	DG	
Referee		Ron Gelder (Wilmslow)

Scoring - Try = three (3) points - Goal = two (2) points - Drop goal = two (2) points

=== The road to success ===
First round
Salford	0
Warrington	31
blank
blank
Swinton	2
St. Helens	12
Blackpool Borough	8
Workington Town	22
Barrow	12
Wigan	34
Rochdale Hornets	7
Leigh	19
Oldham	10
Widnes	5
Liverpool City	6-5
Whitehaven	6-31

Second round
Warrington
bye
St. Helens	28
Workington Town	4
Wigan	5
Leigh	7
Oldham	35
Whitehaven	4

Semi-finals
Warrington	14
St. Helens	21
Leigh	10
Oldham	0

Final
St. Helens	15
Leigh	4

== Media coverage ==
The Lancashire Cup final was televised for the first time in its history. The match was broadcast on BBC TV's Grandstand programme.

== Notes and comments ==
1 * The first Lancashire Cup match to be played in Blackpool's new stadium
2 * Station Road was the home ground of Swinton from 1929 to 1992 and at its peak was one of the finest rugby league grounds in the country and it boasted a capacity of 60,000. The actual record attendance was for the Challenge Cup semi-final on 7 April 1951 when 44,621 watched Wigan beat Warrington 3-2

== See also ==
- 1963–64 Northern Rugby Football League season
- Rugby league county cups
