= Alan Buckley (rugby league) =

GB & England international rugby league footballer (1941–2008)

Personal information
- Full name: Alan Buckley
- Born: 23 October 1941 Ardwick, England
- Died: 12 March 2008 (aged 66) Walkden, England

Playing information

Rugby union
Club
Years	Team	Pld	T	G	FG	P
≤1960–60	Broughton Park RUFC

Rugby league
- Position: Left-Centre
Club
Years	Team	Pld	T	G	FG	P
1960–74	Swinton	466	192	3	0	582
Representative
Years	Team	Pld	T	G	FG	P
1962–71	Lancashire	10	2	1	0	8
1963–66	Great Britain	7	1	0	0	3
1968	England	1	0	0	0	0

Alan Buckley (23 October 1941 – 12 March 2008) was an English rugby union, and professional rugby league footballer who played in the 1950s, 1960s and 1970s. He played club level rugby union (RU) for Broughton Park RUFC, and representative level rugby league (RL) for Great Britain and England, and at club level for Swinton, as a centre. Buckley joined Swinton ("the Lions") from Broughton Park RUFC in Chorlton-cum-Hardy near the end of the 1950s, and was virtually an overnight sensation at Station Road tearing through opposing defences with his blistering pace and determined running.

== Background ==
Buckley was born in Ardwick, Lancashire, England, and he died aged 66 in Walkden, Greater Manchester, England.

== Playing career ==
=== Swinton ===
Buckley played left-centre in Swinton's 9–15 defeat by St. Helens in the 1960 Lancashire Cup Final during the 1960–61 season at Central Park, Wigan on Saturday 29 October 1960, played left-centre in the 4–7 defeat by St. Helens in the 1962 Lancashire Cup Final during the 1962–63 season at Central Park, Wigan on Saturday 27 October 1962, played left-centre in the 4–12 defeat by St. Helens in the 1964 Lancashire Cup Final during the 1964–65 season at Central Park, Wigan on Saturday 24 October 1964, played left-centre in the 11–2 victory over Leigh in the 1969 Lancashire Cup Final during the 1969–70 season at Central Park, Wigan on Saturday 1 November 1969, and played left-centre in the 11–25 defeat by Salford in the 1972 Lancashire Cup Final during the 1972–73 season at Central Park, Wigan on Saturday 21 October 1972.

Buckley played left-centre in Swinton's 2–7 defeat by Castleford in the 1966 BBC2 Floodlit Trophy Final during the 1966–67 season at Wheldon Road, Castleford on Tuesday 20 December 1966.

=== International honours ===
Buckley won a cap for England while at Swinton in 1968 against Wales (sub), and won caps for Great Britain while at Swinton in 1963 against Australia, in 1964 against France, in 1965 against New Zealand, and in 1966 against France, on the 1966 Great Britain Lions tour against Australia (2 matches), and New Zealand.

Four Swinton ("the Lions") players took part in the 1966 Great Britain Lions tour to Australasia, they were; Alan Buckley, Ken Gowers (vice-captain), Dave Robinson and John Stopford.
