= Billy Morgan =

Billy Morgan may refer to:

- Billy Morgan (Gaelic footballer) (born 1945), Gaelic football player and manager with Cork GAA
- Billy Morgan (footballer, born 1878) (1878–1939), English football player for Newton Heath, Manchester United, Bolton Wanderers, Watford and Leicester
- Billy Morgan (footballer, born 1891), English football player for Birmingham, Coventry City and Crystal Palace
- Billy Morgan (footballer, born 1896) (1896–1993), English football player
- Billy Morgan (snowboarder) (born 1989), British snowboarder

== See also ==
- Bill Morgan (disambiguation)
- William Morgan (disambiguation)
- Billie Morgan, a 2005 novel by Joolz Denby
