= Huddart =

Huddart is a surname. Notable people with the surname include:

- Claire Huddart (born 1971), British swimmer
- Dick Huddart (1936–2021), English-Australian rugby league footballer (father of Milton)
- John J. Huddart (1856–1930), British-American architect
- Joseph Huddart (1741–1816), British hydrographer
- Milton Huddart (1960–2015), English rugby league footballer (son of Dick)

== See also ==
- Gopal Mukund Huddar (1902–1981), Indian anti-colonial activist and soldier
