= Mick Murphy (rugby league) =

Wales international rugby league footballer (1941–2019)

Personal information
- Full name: Michael Anastasio Murphy
- Born: 30 September 1941 Liverpool, England
- Died: 17 March 2019 (aged 77) Huddersfield, West Yorkshire, England

Playing information
- Height: 6 ft 4 in (1.93 m)
- Weight: 17 st 0 lb (108 kg)

Rugby union
Club
Years	Team	Pld	T	G	FG	P
≤1963–63	Waterloo R.F.C.

Rugby league
- Position: Prop
Club
Years	Team	Pld	T	G	FG	P
1963–69	Leigh	166	7	0	0	21
1969–72	Barrow
1972–75	St. Helens	98	4	0	0	12
1975–77	Bradford Northern	73	6	0	0	18
1979	Blackpool Borough	9	0	0	0	0
	Total	346	17	0	0	51
Representative
Years	Team	Pld	T	G	FG	P
1970–72	Lancashire	2	0	0	0	0
1975–79	Wales	5	0	0	0	0

Michael Anastasio Murphy (30 September 1941 – 17 March 2019) was an English rugby union and professional rugby league footballer who played in the 1960s and 1970s. He played club level rugby union (RU) for Waterloo R.F.C., and representative level rugby league (RL) for Wales and Lancashire, and at club level for Leigh, Barrow, St Helens, Bradford Northern, Wagga Wagga (in New South Wales, Australia), Tonneins XIII (in France) and St. Jacques XIII (in France) as a prop.

== Background ==
Murphy was born in Liverpool, Merseyside, England.

He worked as a physical education teacher, he taught at Howard Street College, Barrow-in-Furness, he worked as a television actor, and he appeared as the character 'Ged' in the television series Merseybeat episode 'Unhappy Medium' that aired on 29 July 2002

== Playing career ==
=== International honours ===
Mick Murphy won caps for Wales (RL) while at Bradford Northern in the 1975 Rugby League World Cup against France, New Zealand, and France, in 1977 against France, and while at St. Jacques XIII, France in 1979 against France.

=== County honours ===
Mick Murphy won caps for Lancashire (RL) while at Barrow.

=== County Cup Final appearances ===
Mick Murphy played at second-row in Leigh's 4–15 defeat by St. Helens in the 1963 Lancashire Cup Final during the 1963–64 season at Knowsley Road, St. Helens on Saturday 26 October 1963.

=== BBC2 Floodlit Trophy Final appearances ===
Mick Murphy played at second-row in Leigh's 5–8 defeat by Castleford in the 1967 BBC2 Floodlit Trophy Final during the 1967–68 season at Headingley, Leeds on Saturday 16 January 1968.

=== Club career ===
Mick Murphy made his début for St. Helens in the 2–13 defeat by Widnes at Naughton Park on Wednesday 13 September 1972.
