= Tembey =

Tembey may be,

- Tembey language
- John Tembey
