= Bob Dagnall =

GB & England international rugby league footballer

Personal information
- Full name: Robert Dagnall
- Born: 30 January 1932; Prescot, Lancashire, England
- Died: 18 September 1999 (aged 67); Whiston, Merseyside, England

Playing information
- Position: Hooker
Club
| Years | Team | Pld | T | G | FG | P |
|---|---|---|---|---|---|---|
| 1949–60 | Rochdale Hornets |
| 1960–67 | St. Helens | 210 | 8 | 0 | 0 | 24 |
| 1967–≥67 | Pilkington Recs |
| | Total | 210 | 8 | 0 | 0 | 24 |
Representative
| Years | Team | Pld | T | G | FG | P |
| 1961–65 | Great Britain | 4 | 1 | 0 | 0 | 3 |

Robert Dagnall (30 January 1932 – 18 September 1999) was an English former professional rugby league footballer who played in the 1960s. He played at representative level for Great Britain, and at club level for Rochdale Hornets, St Helens and Pilkington Recs, as a hooker.

== Background ==
Bob Dagnall's birth was registered in Prescot district, Lancashire, England.

== Playing career ==
=== International honours ===
Bob Dagnall won caps for Great Britain while at St. Helens in 1961 against New Zealand (2 matches), in 1964 against France, and in 1965 against France.

=== Challenge Cup Final appearances ===
Bob Dagnall played hooker in St. Helens' 12-6 victory over Wigan in the 1961 Challenge Cup Final during the 1960–61 season at Wembley Stadium, London on Saturday 13 May 1961, in front of a crowd of 94,672.

=== County Cup Final appearances ===
Bob Dagnall played hooker in St. Helens' 15-9 victory over Swinton in the 1960 Lancashire Cup Final during the 1960–61 season at Central Park, Wigan on Saturday 29 October 1960, played hooker in the 25-9 victory over Swinton in the 1961 Lancashire Cup Final during the 1961–62 season at Central Park, Wigan on Saturday 11 November 1961, played hooker in the 7-4 victory over Swinton in the 1962 Lancashire Cup Final during the 1962–63 season at Central Park, Wigan on Saturday 27 October 1962, played hooker in the 15-4 victory over Leigh in the 1963 Lancashire Cup Final during the 1963–64 season at Station Road, Swinton on Saturday 26 October 1963, and played hooker in the 12-4 victory over Swinton in the 1964 Lancashire Cup Final during the 1964–65 season at Central Park, Wigan on Saturday 24 October 1964.

=== BBC2 Floodlit Trophy Final appearances ===
Bob Dagnall played hooker in St. Helens' 0-4 defeat by Castleford in the 1965 BBC2 Floodlit Trophy Final during the 1965–66 season at Knowsley Road, St. Helens on Tuesday 14 December 1965.

== Honoured at St Helens R.F.C. ==
Bob Dagnall is a St Helens R.F.C. Hall of Fame inductee.
