= John Simpson (English cricketer) =

English cricketer (born 1988)

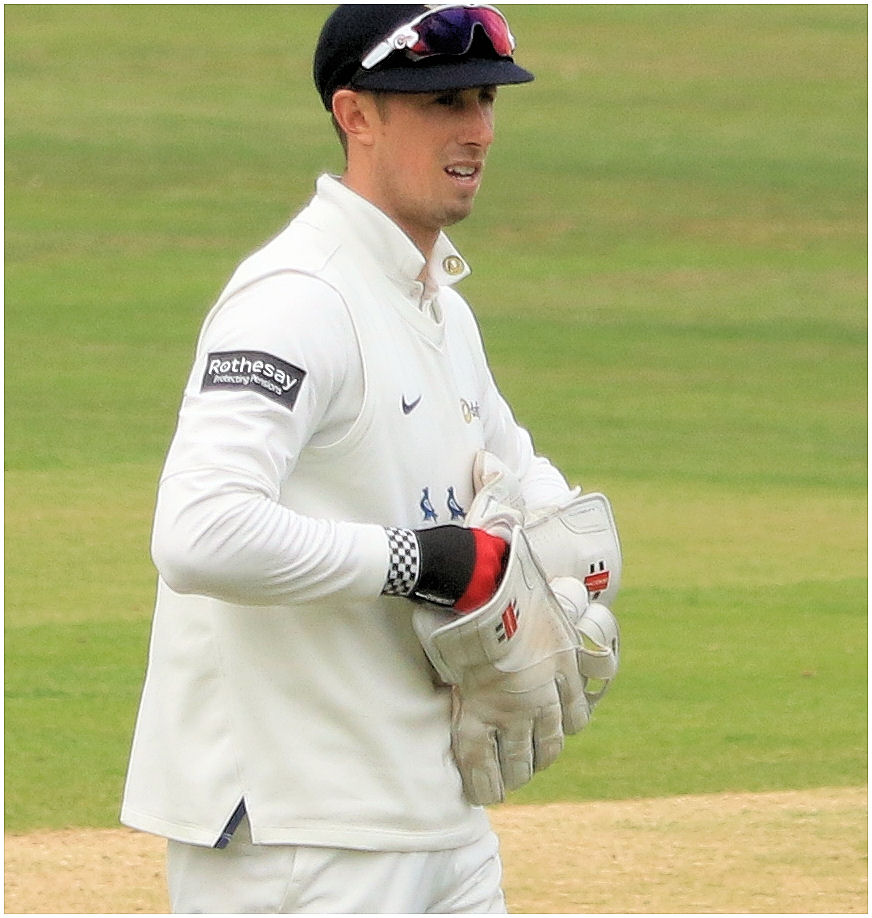
- Simpson in 2025

Personal information
- Full name: John Andrew Simpson
- Born: 13 July 1988 (age 38); Bury, Lancashire
- Batting: Left-handed
- Role: Wicket-keeper
- Relatives: Walter Gowers (great grandfather); Ken Gowers (grandfather)

International information
- National side: England
- ODI debut (cap 263): 8 July 2021 v Pakistan
- Last ODI: 13 July 2021 v Pakistan

Domestic team information
- Years: Team
- 2007: Cumberland
- 2009–2023: Middlesex (squad no. 20)
- 2017/18: Brothers Union
- 2021–2022: Northern Superchargers
- 2024–2026: Sussex (squad no. 9)
- 2025: London Spirit
- 2027–present: Nottinghamshire

Career statistics
Competition	ODI	FC	LA	T20
Matches	3	243	118	204
Runs scored	20	11,932	2,223	3,325
Batting average	10.00	36.26	27.10	21.31
100s/50s	0/0	21/62	0/13	0/13
Top score	17	205*	85	84*
Catches/stumpings	9/0	766/45	112/21	102/33
- Source: CricketArchive, 29 September 2026

John Andrew Simpson (born 13 July 1988) is an English cricketer who plays for Nottinghamshire County Cricket Club. Simpson is a wicket-keeper and left-handed batsman who won the Denis Compton Award in 2004 at Lancashire, and 2011 at Middlesex. He made his international debut for the England cricket team in July 2021.

== Career ==
=== Domestic career ===
Simpson represented England U19s on tour to India in 2004/05 aged 16 and again in 2005/06 on a tour to Bangladesh. For the 2007 season he joined Lancashire on a scholarship, he played second XI cricket for Lancashire, Durham and Nottinghamshire during the campaign.

In 2009 he made his professional debut when selected for Middlesex's Twenty20 match against Sussex. On 9 April 2010, Simpson made his first-class debut against Worcestershire at New Road. He made 20 in the first and 0 in the second innings as Middlesex were beaten by 111 runs, he did however take five catches behind the stumps.

Simpson averaged 18.05 in the 2012 season, with no hundreds or fifties. However, in the opening round of matches of the 2013 County Championship, Simpson made 97 not out for Middlesex.

In 2018, he played for Brothers Union in the 2017–18 Dhaka Premier Division Cricket League in Bangladesh.

He was signed by Northern Superchargers for first edition of The Hundred tournament. In April 2022, he was bought by the Northern Superchargers for the 2022 season of The Hundred.

Simpson was awarded a testimonial year by Middlesex in 2023.

Simpson joined Sussex on a four-year contract on 20 October 2023. In January 2024 Sussex named him as captain, initially for the first seven County Championship matches. Simpson led Sussex to promotion to in 2024, and was named in the BBC Sport Team of the Year for the 2025 County Championship after scoring 1086 runs and making 54 dismissals. For 2026, Simpson was announced as club captain, with Ollie Robinson taking over the first-class captaincy.

On 29 September 2026, it was announced that Simpson had joined Nottinghamshire on a two-year contract.

=== International career ===
In July 2021, Simpson was named in England's One Day International (ODI) squad for their series against Pakistan, after the original squad for the tour was forced to withdraw following positive tests for COVID-19. Simpson made his ODI debut on 8 July 2021, for England against Pakistan.

== Family links to other sports ==
Simpson is the grandson and great-grandson of two former professional rugby league footballers who were regarded as two of the best fullbacks in the game at their times. His great-grandfather, Walter Gowers, played as a fullback for Rochdale Hornets during the Interwar period as well as being selected for the Great Britain touring squad to Australasia in 1928 even though he did not actually play at test match level.

Simpson's grandfather, Ken Gowers (Walter's son) was the outstanding fullback for Swinton from the 1950s to the 1970s. Ken was one of several Swinton players who were capped for Great Britain during the 1960s when the Lions' ground Station Road was the scene of many great Lions' victories in the club's postwar "swinging sixties" decade. Ken Gowers was also a useful cricketer. He would often change from the oval ball game to the summer game after rugby league fixtures were completed each spring.

John Simpson's father Jack Simpson played Lacrosse for England and Rochdale for whom he played in two world championships.
