= Norman Field (rugby league) =

GB international rugby league footballer

Personal information
- Full name: Norman Field
- Born: second quarter 1936 Huddersfield district, England
- Died: 13 January 2008 (aged 71) Torquay, England

Playing information
- Position: Wing
Club
| Years | Team | Pld | T | G | FG | P |
|---|---|---|---|---|---|---|
| ≤1954–≤57 | Batley | 72 | 15 | 0 | 0 | 45 |
| 1957–58 | Featherstone Rovers | 6 | 1 | 0 | 0 | 3 |
| ≤1958–64 | Batley | 95 | 37 | 0 | 0 | 111 |
| | Total | 173 | 53 | 0 | 0 | 159 |
Representative
| Years | Team | Pld | T | G | FG | P |
| 1963–64 | Yorkshire | ≥1 |
| 1963 | Great Britain | 1 | 0 | 0 | 0 | 0 |

Norman Field (second quarter 1936 – 13 January 2008) was an English professional rugby league footballer who played in the 1950s and 1960s. He played at representative level for Great Britain, and at club level for Huddersfield), Batley (two spells) and Featherstone Rovers, as a wing.

== Background ==
Norman Field's birth was registered in Huddersfield district, West Riding of Yorkshire, England, he started his rugby career whilst serving in the British Army, with the Duke of Wellington's Regiment, he ran a motorcycle business on Bradford Road, Batley throughout his rugby days, in the early 1980s he and his wife Susan moved to Torquay to run a hotel, which they converted into flats circa-2005, he died aged 71 from cancer in Torquay, Devon.

== Playing career ==
=== International honours ===
Norman Field won a cap for Great Britain while at Batley: he played left wing in the 2–28 defeat by Australia at Wembley Stadium, London, on Wednesday 16 October 1963.

=== County honours ===
Norman Field was selected for Yorkshire County XIII while at Batley during the 1963–64 season.

=== Club career ===
Norman Field was transferred from Lockwood ARLFC to Batley during January 1954, he was transferred from Batley to Featherstone Rovers, he made his début for Featherstone Rovers on Thursday 15 August 1957, he played his last match for Featherstone Rovers during the 1957–58 season, he was transferred from Featherstone Rovers to Batley, he was subject of a transfer bid from Huddersfield in early-1964, but they were unwilling to meet Batley's valuation of £6,000 (based on increases in average earnings, this would be approximately £229,800 in 2018), and he subsequently retired from rugby league in 1964 aged-28 to concentrate on his business interests.
