= Ken Day (rugby league) =

Australia international rugby league footballer

Personal information
- Born: 16 May 1936; Caboolture, Queensland, Australia
- Died: 29 October 1998 (aged 62)

Playing information
- Position: Second-row
Club
Years	Team	Pld	T	G	FG	P
	Wests (Brisbane)
1965–68	Manly-Warringah	69	4	0	1	14
	Souths (Townsville)
	Total	69	4	0	1	14
Representative
Years	Team	Pld	T	G	FG	P
1961–64	Australia	9	2	0	0	6
1961–64	Queensland	14
1965	City NSW	1	0	0	0	0
	Townsville

Coaching information
Club
Years	Team	Gms	W	D	L	W%
1972	Redcliffe

Ken Day (1936–1998), also known by the nickname of "High Tower", was an Australian professional rugby league footballer who played in the 1960s. An Australian international and Queensland representative forward, he played his club football in Brisbane for Western Suburbs and in Sydney for Manly-Warringah.

== Biography ==
Originally from Caboolture, while playing in the Brisbane Rugby League premiership for Western Suburbs in 1961, Day was selected to make his debut for the Queensland Maroons and then the Australian national team, becoming Kangaroo No. 363. He was selected to go on the 1961 Kangaroo tour of New Zealand, playing one tour match and no Test matches. Despite receiving offers of over 1,000 Australian pounds from Townsville and North Sydney clubs at the end of the season, he opted to stay in Brisbane.

Day was selected to go on the 1963–64 Kangaroo tour of Great Britain and France, playing for Australia at second-row forward in the second Ashes series Test match against Great Britain, and in the third Test match against France. He made his test début in 1963 and was part of the Australia touring team that won The Ashes in Britain for the first time ever.

From 1965 to 1968 Day played in the New South Wales Rugby Football League premiership for the Manly-Warringah club. Whilst there he also represented City New South Wales.

Day played out the remainder of his career for Townsville's Souths club. He also represented Townsville in the Foley Shield competition.

In 1972 Day coached in the Brisbane Rugby League Premiership with the Redcliffe Dolphins.
