= John Cleary (rugby) =

Australian rugby league player

Personal information
- Born: 12 October 1938 (age 86)

Playing information
- Position: Prop
Representative
| Years | Team | Pld | T | G | FG | P |
|---|---|---|---|---|---|---|
| 1963 | Queensland | 3 | 0 | 0 | 0 | 0 |
| 1963–64 | Australia |

John Cleary (born 12 October 1938) is an Australian former rugby footballer.

Raised on the Darling Downs, Cleary attended Nudgee College as a boarder and pursued rugby union as his preferred sport while undertaking further studies at teacher's college in Toowoomba. He competed for the city's Harlequins club and also had a stint in Brisbane with Brothers. A breakaway, Cleary was a Queensland representative player and his appearances included a match against the 1959 British Lions.

Cleary switched to rugby league after getting a teaching position in Harrisville and competed for nearby Ipswich in the Bulimba Cup competition. He had his best season in 1963 when he broke into the Queensland side and won a place as a prop on the national squad for their 1963–64 tour of Europe. In 1964, Cleary relocated to Townsville for work and coached in the local competition.
