= Bill Robinson (rugby league) =

Former GB international rugby league footballer

Personal information
- Full name: William Gordon Robinson
- Born: 8 August 1934; Wigan, England
- Died: 5 December 2005 (aged 71); Wigan, England

Playing information
- Position: Prop
Club
Years	Team	Pld	T	G	FG	P
1953–67	Leigh	395	26	0	0	78
1968	Parramatta Eels	4	0	0	0	0
	Total	399	26	0	0	78
Representative
Years	Team	Pld	T	G	FG	P
1963	Great Britain	2	0	0	0	0

William Robinson (8 August 1934 – 5 December 2005) was an English professional rugby league footballer who played during the 1950s and 1960s. He played at the representative level for Great Britain, and at club level for Leigh and Parramatta Eels, as a prop.

== Background ==
Bill Robinson was born in Wigan, Lancashire, England, and he died at the age of 71 in Royal Albert Edward Infirmary, Wigan, Greater Manchester, England.

== Playing career ==
=== International honours ===
Bill Robinson won caps for Great Britain while at Leigh in the 42-4 victory over France at Central Park, Wigan on Wednesday 3 April 1963, and in the 12-50 defeat by Australia at Station Road, Swinton on Saturday 9 November 1963.

=== County Cup Final appearances ===
Bill Robinson played at prop in Leigh's 4-15 defeat by St. Helens in the 1963 Lancashire Cup Final during the 1963–64 season at Knowsley Road, St. Helens on Saturday 26 October 1963.
