= 1969–70 Lancashire Cup =

- Structure: Regional knockout championship
- Teams: 16
- Winners: Swinton
- Runners-up: Leigh

The season of 1969–70 was the fifty-seventh occasion on which the Lancashire Cup completion had been held.
Swinton won the trophy by beating Leigh by the score of 11-2
The match was played at Central Park, Wigan, (historically in the county of Lancashire). The attendance was 13,532 and receipts were £3,651-0s-0d

== Background ==
The total number of teams entering the competition increased by two, up to the total of 16. This was as a result of inviting two junior (or amateur) clubs, St Helens Amateurs and Maryport.
The same fixture format was retained, and due to the increase in the number of participating clubs, resulted in a full fixture list with no byes or “blank” or “dummy” fixtures.

== Competition and results ==
=== Round 1 ===
Involved 8 matches (with no bye or “blank” fixture) and 16 clubs

Game No	Fixture date	Home team	Score	Away team	Venue	Att	Rec	Notes	Ref
1	Saturday 15 August 1969	Leigh	15-12	Warrington	Hilton Park				
2	Saturday 16 August 1969	Oldham	24-28	Swinton	Watersheddings				
3	Saturday 16 August 1969	Whitehaven	24-10	Barrow	Recreation Ground				
4	Saturday 16 August 1969	Wigan	25-9	Salford	Central Park				
5	Sunday 17 August 1969	Huyton	13-16	Blackpool Borough	Alt Park, Huyton			1	
6	Sunday 17 August 1969	Rochdale Hornets	42-5	St Helens Amateurs	Athletic Grounds			1	
7	Sunday 17 August 1969	Widnes	16-15	Workington Town	Naughton Park				
8	Monday 1 September 1969	St. Helens	58-5	Maryport	Knowsley Road			3	

=== Round 2 - Quarter-finals ===
Involved 4 matches (with no bye) and 8 clubs

Game No	Fixture date	Home team	Score	Away team	Venue	Att	Rec	Notes	Ref
1	Wednesday 17 September 1969	Swinton	59-5	Blackpool Borough	Station Road				
2	Monday 22 September 1969	Wigan	38-12	Whitehaven	Central Park				
3	Monday 29 September 1969	Widnes	22-14	St. Helens	Naughton Park				
4	Wednesday 1 October 1969	Rochdale Hornets	10-11	Leigh	Athletic Grounds				

=== Round 3 – Semi-finals ===
Involved 2 matches and 4 clubs

Game No	Fixture date	Home team	Score	Away team	Venue	Att	Rec	Notes	Ref
1	Wednesday 1 October 1969	Leigh	15-4	Widnes	Hilton Park				
2	Wednesday 8 October 1969	Swinton	9-6	Wigan	Station Road	12,326			

=== Final ===
Game No	Fixture date	Home team	Score	Away team	Venue	Att	Rec	Notes	Ref
	Saturday 1 November 1969	Swinton	11-2	Leigh	Central Park	13,532	£3,651	4	

==== Teams and scorers ====
Swinton	№	Leigh
	teams	
Ken Gowers	1	Tom Grainey
John Gomersall	2	Rod Tickle
Bob Fleet (c)	3	Tom Warburton
Alan Buckley	4	Mick Collins
Mick Philbin	5	Harold Stringer
Billy Davies	6	David Eckersley
Peter Kenny	7	Alex Murphy (c)
Harold Bate	8	Dave Chisnall
Derek Clarke	9	Kevin Ashcroft
Graham Mackay	10	Derek Watts
Bill Holliday	11	Bob Welding
Rod Smith	12	Jimmy Fiddler
Dave Robinson	13	Geoff Lyon
Jeff Price (not used)	14	Dennis Brown (for Harold Stringer)
Malcolm Cummings (not used)	15	Paul Grimes (not used)
11	score	2
2	HT	0
	Scorers	
	Tries	
Mick Philbin (1)	T	
	Drop Goals	
Peter Kenny (4)	DG	Alex Murphy (1)
Referee		Eric Clay, Leeds

Scoring - Try = three (3) points - Goal = two (2) points - Drop goal = two (2) points

=== The road to success ===
First round
Oldham	24
Swinton	28
Huyton	13
Blackpool Borough	16
Wigan	25
Salford	9
Whitehaven	24
Barrow	10
Rochdale Hornets	42
St Helens Amateurs	5
Leigh	15
Warrington	12
Widnes	16
Workington Town	15
St. Helens	58
Maryport	5

Second round
Swinton	59
Blackpool Borough	5
Wigan	38
Whitehaven	12
Rochdale Hornets	10
Leigh	11
Widnes	22
St. Helens	14

Semi-finals
Swinton	9
Wigan	6
Leigh	15
Widnes	4

Final
Swinton	11
Leigh	2

== Notes and comments ==
1 * The first Lancashire Cup match to be played at Huyton's newly completed new stadium
2 * St Helens Amateurs were a junior (or amateur) club
3 * Maryport a junior (or amateur) club from Cumberland
4 * Central Park was the home ground of Wigan with a final capacity of 18,000, although the record attendance was 47,747 for Wigan v St Helens 27 March 1959

== See also ==
- 1969–70 Northern Rugby Football League season
- Rugby league county cups
