= Ken Gowers =

GB & England international rugby league footballer (1936–2017)

Personal information
- Full name: Joseph Kenneth Gowers
- Born: 15 October 1936 Wigan, Lancashire, England
- Died: 19 October 2017 (aged 81) Bury, Greater Manchester, England

Playing information
- Height: 5 ft 6 in (1.68 m)
- Weight: 12 st 5 lb (78 kg)
- Position: Fullback, Scrum-half
Club
Years	Team	Pld	T	G	FG	P
1954–73	Swinton	601	55	970	0	2105
Representative
Years	Team	Pld	T	G	FG	P
1958–66	Lancashire	12	0	27	0	54
1962	England	1	0	0	0	0
1962–66	Great Britain	14	0	20	1	42
- Father: Walter Gowers
- Relatives: John Simpson (grandson)

Joseph Kenneth Gowers (15 October 1936 – 19 October 2017) was an English professional rugby league footballer who played in the 1950s, 1960s and 1970s. He played at representative level for Great Britain (vice-captain), England and Rugby League XIII, and at club level for Newbold Intermediates ARLFC (in Newbold, Rochdale) and Swinton, as a goal-kicking fullback, and occasionally scrum-half.

== Background ==
Gowers was born in Wigan, Lancashire.

He was the son of the rugby league, and association footballer Walter Gowers, and maternal grandfather of the Middlesex cricketer John Simpson.

He died in Bury, Greater Manchester aged 81. His funeral took place at St Joseph Roman Catholic Church, Peter Street, Bury on Monday 6 November 2017, followed by a wake at Woodbank Cricket Club, Stafford Street, Bury.

== Playing career ==
=== International honours ===
Gowers won a cap for England while at Swinton in 1962 against France, and won caps for Great Britain while at Swinton in 1962 against France, in 1963 against France, and Australia (3 matches), in 1964 against France (2 matches), in 1965 against New Zealand (2 matches), and in 1966 against France (2 matches), and on the 1966 Great Britain Lions tour against Australia, and New Zealand (2 matches). Gowers was the tourists' vice-captain on the 1966 Great Britain tour of Australasia.

Four Swinton ("the Lions") players took part in the 1966 Great Britain Lions tour to Australasia, they were; Alan Buckley, Ken Gowers (vice-captain), Dave Robinson and John Stopford.

Gowers played fullback for Rugby League XIII while at Swinton in the 8–26 defeat by France on Saturday 22 November 1958 at Knowsley Road, St. Helens.

=== County Cup Final appearances ===
Gowers played fullback in Swinton's 9–15 defeat by St. Helens in the 1960 Lancashire Cup Final during the 1960–61 season at Central Park, Wigan on Saturday 29 October 1960, played fullback in the 9–25 defeat by St. Helens in the 1961 Lancashire Cup Final during the 1961–62 season at Central Park, Wigan on Saturday 11 November 1961, played fullback in the 4–7 defeat by St. Helens in the 1962 Lancashire Cup Final during the 1962–63 season at Central Park, Wigan on Saturday 27 October 1962, played fullback in the 4–12 defeat by St. Helens in the 1964 Lancashire Cup Final during the 1964–65 season at Central Park, Wigan on Saturday 24 October 1964, played fullback in the 11–2 victory over Leigh in the 1969 Lancashire Cup Final during the 1969–70 season at Central Park, Wigan on Saturday 1 November 1969, and played scrum-half, and scored 3-goals in the 11–25 defeat by Salford in the 1972 Lancashire Cup Final during the 1972–73 season at Central Park, Wigan on Saturday 21 October 1972.

=== BBC2 Floodlit Trophy Final appearances ===
Gowers played fullback in Swinton's 2–7 defeat by Castleford in the 1966 BBC2 Floodlit Trophy Final during the 1966–67 season at Wheldon Road, Castleford on Tuesday 20 December 1966.
