= Walter Gowers =

GB international rugby league footballer

Personal information
- Full name: Walter Gowers
- Born: c. 1903 Wigan, England
- Died: 11 September 1965 (aged 62) Rochdale, England

Playing information
- Position: Fullback
Club
Years	Team	Pld	T	G	FG	P
1922–36	Rochdale Hornets	455	5	733	24	1497
1936	St. Helens	6	0	7	2	18
1946	Rochdale Hornets	1	0	0	0	0
	Total	462	5	740	26	1515
Representative
Years	Team	Pld	T	G	FG	P
1923–30	Lancashire	11	0	30		60
1928	Great Britain	0
- Relatives: Ken Gowers (son); John Simpson (great-grandson)

Walter Gowers (c. 1903 – 11 September 1965) was a professional rugby league and footballer who played in the 1920s, 1930s and 1940s. He played representative level rugby league (RL) for Great Britain (non-Test matches), and Lancashire, and at club level for Rochdale Hornets (two spells), and St Helens, as a goal-kicking fullback, and club level association football (soccer) for Preston North End, as a full-back.

== Playing career ==
=== Club career ===
Born in Wigan, Gowers played amateur rugby league for local club Platt Bridge before signing with Rochdale Hornets during the 1922–23 season.

In 1926, during a period of unemployment, he signed for association football club Preston North End, playing as a fullback for their reserve team.

Gowers had a brief spell with St Helens before retiring from rugby league in 1937. He came out of retirement aged c. 42–43 to play one match for Rochdale Hornets against Wigan at Central Park, Wigan on Saturday 12 January 1946.

Walter Gowers holds Rochdale Hornets' "most appearances in a career" record with 456-appearances between 1922 and 1946, and Gowers also holds Rochdale Hornets' "most points in a career" record with 1497-points scored between 1922 and 1946. He previously held Rochdale Hornets' "most goals in a season" record with 109-goals during the 1933–34 season, this record was extended by Graham Starkey during the 1966–67 season.

=== Representative honours ===
Walter Gowers represented Great Britain in non-Test matches on the 1928 Great Britain rugby league tour of Australia and New Zealand, scoring 27-goals.

Walter Gowers represented Lancashire while at Rochdale Hornets, winning four County Championship medals.

== Post-playing ==
After the Second World War, Gowers worked as a groundsman for Rochdale Hornets until 1957.

He died in Rochdale Infirmary on 11 September 1965, aged 62.

== Personal life ==
Walter Gowers was the father of the rugby league footballer; Ken Gowers, and was the great-grandfather of the Middlesex and England cricketer John Simpson (Ken Gowers' grandson).
