= 1961–62 Lancashire Cup =

- Structure: Regional knockout championship
- Teams: 14
- Winners: St. Helens
- Runners-up: Swinton

1961–62 was the forty-ninth occasion on which the Lancashire Cup completion had been held. St. Helens won the trophy by beating Swinton by the score of 25–9.

The match was played at Central Park, Wigan, (historically in the county of Lancashire). The attendance was 30,000, the last time the attendance at a Lancashire Cup final would reach 30,000, and receipts were £4,850.

This was the second of five consecutive Lancashire Cup final wins for St. Helens, and what is more, the second of the seven victories in a period of nine successive seasons.

It was also the second of Swinton’s three successive Lancashire Cup final runner-up positions.

== Background ==
With again no invitation to a junior club this season, the total number of teams entering the competition remained the same at 14.

The same fixture format was retained, and due to the number of clubs this resulted in no bye but one “blank” or “dummy” fixture in the first round, and one bye in the second round

== Competition and results ==
=== Round 1 ===
Involved 7 matches (with no bye but one “blank” fixture) and 14 clubs

Game No	Fixture date	Home team	Score	Away team	Venue	Att	Rec	Notes	Ref
1	Saturday 2 September 1961	Barrow	3-10	Oldham	Craven Park				
2	Saturday 2 September 1961	Liverpool City	14-16	Salford	Mill Yard, Knotty Ash				
3	Saturday 2 September 1961	Rochdale Hornets	3-22	Blackpool Borough	Athletic Grounds				
4	Saturday 2 September 1961	St. Helens	43-8	Leigh	Knowsley Road	21,800			
5	Saturday 2 September 1961	Swinton	18-7	Warrington	Station Road				
6	Saturday 2 September 1961	Widnes	54-2	Whitehaven	Naughton Park				
7	Saturday 2 September 1961	Workington Town	18-30	Wigan	Derwent Park				
8		blank		blank					

=== Round 2 - quarterfinals ===
Involved 3 matches (with one bye) and 7 clubs

Game No	Fixture date	Home team	Score	Away team	Venue	Att	Rec	Notes	Ref
1	Monday 18 September 1961	Salford	22-10	Blackpool Borough	The Willows				
2	Thursday 21 September 1961	Widnes	9-5	Wigan	Naughton Park				
3	Monday 2 October 1961	St. Helens	30-7	Oldham	Knowsley Road	18,500			
4	.	Swinton		bye					

=== Round 3 – semifinals ===
Involved 2 matches and 4 clubs

Game No	Fixture date	Home team	Score	Away team	Venue	Att	Rec	Notes	Ref
1	Wednesday 4 October 1961	Swinton	10-5	Widnes	Station Road	13,250			
2	Tuesday 10 October 1961	St. Helens	21-2	Salford	Knowsley Road	18,000			

=== Final ===
Game No	Fixture date	Home team	Score	Away team	Venue	Att	Rec	Notes	Ref
	Saturday 11 November 1961	St. Helens	25-9	Swinton	Central Park	30,000	£4,850	1	

==== Teams and scorers ====
St. Helens	No.	Swinton
	teams	
Austin Rhodes	1	Ken Gowers
Tom van Vollenhoven	2	Bernard McMahon
Ken Large	3	Malcolm Cummings
Brian McGinn	4	Bob Fleet
Mick Sullivan	5	John Speed
Wilf Smith	6	George Parkinson
Alex Murphy	7	Albert Cartwright
Fred Leyland	8	Arnold Thompson
Bob Dagnall	9	Trevor Roberts
Cliff Watson	10	Bill Bretherton
Ray French	11	Ken Roberts
Dick Huddart	12	Peter Norburn
Vince Karalius (c)	13	Albert Blan (c)
25	score	9
9	HT	4
	Scorers	
	Tries	
Austin Rhodes (1)	T	Bill Bretherton (1)
Tom van Vollenhoven (1)	T	
Ken Large (1)	T	
Mick Sullivan (1)	T	
Alex Murphy (1)	T	
	Goals	
Austin Rhodes (5)	G	Albert Blan (3)
	G	
	Drop Goals	
	DG	
Referee		R. Gelder (Wilmslow)

Scoring - Try = three (3) points - Goal = two (2) points - Drop goal = two (2) points

=== The road to success ===
First round
St. Helens	43
Leigh	8
Barrow	3
Oldham	10
Liverpool City	14
Salford	16
Rochdale Hornets	3
Blackpool Borough	22
Swinton	18
Warrington	7
blank
blank
Widnes	54
Whitehaven	2
Workington Town	18
Wigan	30

Second round
St. Helens	30
Oldham	7
Salford	22
Blackpool Borough	10
Swinton
bye
Widnes	9
Wigan	5

Semifinals
St. Helens	21
Salford	2
Swinton	10
Widnes	5

Final
St. Helens	25
Swinton	9

== Notes and comments ==
1 * Central Park was the home ground of Wigan with a final capacity of 18,000, although the record attendance was 47,747 for Wigan v St Helens 27 March 1959

== See also ==
- 1961–62 Northern Rugby Football League season
- Rugby league county cups
