= Percy Landsberg =

South African rugby league footballer

Personal information
- Born: 18 June 1935 Northern Rhodesia
- Died: 13 February 2018 (aged 82)

Playing information
- Height: 5 ft 10 in (178 cm)
- Weight: 11 st 5 lb (72 kg)

Rugby union
Club
Years	Team	Pld	T	G	FG	P
1953	Nchanga
Representative
Years	Team	Pld	T	G	FG	P
1955	Rhodesia

Rugby league
- Position: Centre, Fullback
Club
Years	Team	Pld	T	G	FG	P
1959–60	St Helens	22	2	11	0	28

Percy Landsberg (18 June 1936 – 13 February 2018) was a South African rugby and footballer who played professional rugby league for English club St Helens between 1959 and 1960.

== Background ==
Landsberg was born in the Copperbelt Province of what was then Northern Rhodesia. On leaving school he went to work in the mines and played rugby union for the Nchanga club in Chingola as well as at representative level for Rhodesia.

== Rugby League ==
In 1959 Landsberg was recommended to English club St Helens by another of the club's South African players, Tom van Vollenhoven. Through an intermediary (Note: A direct approach would probably have resulted in a lifetime ban by the South African Rugby Board even had he turned down the offer. Only two years previously Ben Erwee a senior South African rugby union administrator said about a proposed rugby league tour to South Africa, "Rugby in South Africa is a purely amateur sport and should remain that way", adding "If they want to play professional rugby, let them play in their own country, we do not want it here".) an approach was made to Landsberg and in September 1959 he agreed to the offer to change codes and travelled to England. He made his rugby league debut playing at centre on 7 November 1959 against Liverpool City and went on to make a further seven appearances for St Helens in the 1959–60 season. He scored two tries and kicked four goals during the season.

At the start of the 1960–61 season Landsberg change position to play at fullback. He was fullback in the Lancashire Cup final victory 15–9 over Swinton at Central Park, Wigan on 29 October 1960. A week later he played against Whitehaven, but then left St Helens to return to South Africa, as he had not settled in England. During the 1960–61 season he made 14 appearances kicking seven goals.

== Return to South Africa ==
Landsberg returned to the mines in the Copperbelt. He was unable to play rugby union as the South African Rugby Board banned him for professionalism. Instead he played football and baseball, appearing for Northern Rhodesia at football. In later life he moved south to Durban and then Pretoria. He died in South Africa on 13 February 2018.
