= Billy Davies (rugby league, born 1948) =

GB & England international rugby league footballer

Personal information
- Full name: William Davies
- Born: 14 March 1948 (age 78) Leigh, England

Playing information
- Position: Stand-off
Club
Years	Team	Pld	T	G	FG	P
1964–72	Swinton	204	69	0	0	207
1972–73	Wigan	43	11	0	0	33
	Total	247	80	0	0	240
Representative
Years	Team	Pld	T	G	FG	P
1968	England	1	0	0	0	0
1968	Great Britain	1	0	0	0	0
1969–71	Lancashire	2	1	0	0	3

William Davies (born 14 March 1948), also known by the nickname of "Daz", is an English former professional rugby league footballer who played in the 1960s and 1970s. He played at representative level for Great Britain and England, and at club level for Swinton and Wigan, as a stand-off.

== Background ==
Billy Davies was born in Leigh, Lancashire, England.

== Playing career ==
=== International honours ===
Billy Davies won a cap for England while at Swinton in 1968 against Wales, and won a cap for Great Britain while at Swinton in 1968 against France.

=== Swinton ===
Davies made his debut for Swinton in October 1964.

He was a substitute in Swinton's 4-12 defeat by St. Helens in the 1964 Lancashire Cup Final during the 1964–65 season at Central Park, Wigan on Saturday 24 October 1964, and played stand-off in the 11-2 victory over Leigh in the 1969 Lancashire Cup Final during the 1969–70 season at Central Park, Wigan on Saturday 1 November 1969.

Davies played centre in Swinton's 2–7 defeat by Castleford in the 1966 BBC2 Floodlit Trophy Final during the 1966–67 season at Wheldon Road, Castleford on Tuesday 20 December 1966.
