= Jim Measures =

GB international rugby league footballer

Personal information
- Full name: James Measures
- Born: 14 April 1939 (age 85); St. Helens, England

Playing information
- Position: Second-row
Club
Years	Team	Pld	T	G	FG	P
1957–61	St. Helens	41	8	0	0	24
1961–66	Widnes	133	47
	Rochdale Hornets
	Total	174	55	0	0	24
Representative
Years	Team	Pld	T	G	FG	P
1963	Great Britain	2	1	0	0	3

James Measures (born 14 April 1939) is an English former professional rugby league footballer who played in the 1950s and 1960s. He played at representative level for Great Britain, and at club level for St Helens, Widnes and the Rochdale Hornets, as a second-row.

== Background ==
Measures was born in St. Helens, Lancashire, England.

== Playing career ==
=== International honours ===
Jim Measures won caps for Great Britain while at Widnes in 1963 against Australia (2 matches).

=== Challenge Cup Final appearances ===
Jim Measures played left-second-row in Widnes' 13-5 victory over Hull Kingston Rovers in the 1964 Challenge Cup Final during the 1963–64 season at Wembley Stadium, London on Saturday 9 May 1964, in front of a crowd of 84,488.

== Genealogical information ==
Jim Measures is the father of rugby league prop who played in the 1990s for St. Helens Colts, and A-Team, Leigh and Widnes Vikings; Neil Measures.
