= 1962–63 Lancashire Cup =

- Structure: Regional knockout championship
- Teams: 14
- Winners: St. Helens
- Runners-up: Swinton

1962–63 was the fiftieth occasion on which the Lancashire Cup completion had been held.

St. Helens won the trophy by beating Swinton by the score of 7–4.

The match was played at Central Park, Wigan (historically in the county of Lancashire). The attendance was 23,523 and receipts were £4,122.

This was the third of five consecutive Lancashire Cup final wins for St. Helens, and what is more, the third of the seven occasions on which the club will win the trophy in the nine-year period.
It was also the third of Swinton’s three successive Lancashire Cup final runner-up positions.

== Background ==
With again no invitation to a junior club this season, the total number of teams entering the competition remained the same at 14.

The same fixture format was retained, and due to the number of clubs this resulted in no bye but one “blank” or “dummy” fixture in the first round, and one bye in the second round.

== Competition and results ==
=== Round 1 ===
Involved 7 matches (with no bye but one “blank” fixture) and 14 clubs

Game No	Fixture date	Home team	Score	Away team	Venue	Att	Rec	Notes	Ref
1	Friday 7 September 1962	Whitehaven	2-11	Oldham	Recreation Ground				
2	Saturday 8 September 1962	Blackpool Borough	32-9	Salford	St Anne's Road Greyhound Stadium				
3	Saturday 8 September 1962	Rochdale Hornets	11-3	Barrow	Athletic Grounds				
4	Saturday 8 September 1962	St. Helens	22-0	Liverpool City	Knowsley Road	11,500			
5	Saturday 8 September 1962	Swinton	5-2	Widnes	Station Road	10,218			
6	Saturday 8 September 1962	Wigan	11-3	Warrington	Central Park				
7	Saturday 8 September 1962	Workington Town	43-2	Leigh	Derwent Park				
8		blank		blank					

=== Round 2 - Quarter-finals ===
Involved 3 matches (with one bye) and 7 clubs

Game No	Fixture date	Home team	Score	Away team	Venue	Att	Rec	Notes	Ref
1	Monday 17 September 1962	Workington Town	16-8	Wigan	Derwent Park				
2	Tuesday 18 September 1962	Blackpool Borough	3-14	St. Helens	Blackpool	4,000			
3	Tuesday 18 September 1962	Oldham	14-3	Rochdale Hornets	Watersheddings				
4		Swinton		bye					

=== Round 3 – Semi-finals ===
Involved 2 matches and 4 clubs

Game No	Fixture date	Home team	Score	Away team	Venue	Att	Rec	Notes	Ref
1	Tuesday 2 October 1962	Oldham	8-10	St. Helens	Watersheddings	14,000			
2	Wednesday 3 October 1962	Swinton	24-5	Workington Town	Station Road	10,004			

=== Final ===
Game No	Fixture date	Home team	Score	Away team	Venue	Att	Rec	Notes	Ref
	Saturday 27 October 1962	St. Helens	7-4	Swinton	Central Park	23,523	£4,122	1	

==== Teams and scorers ====
St. Helens	No.	Swinton
	teams	
Kel Coslett	1	Ken Gowers
Tom van Vollenhoven	2	Bernard McMahon
John Donovan	3	Frank Halliwell
Wilf Smith	4	Alan Buckley
Mick Sullivan	5	John Speed
Billy Benyon	6	George Parkinson
Jeff Heaton	7	Albert Cartwright
Jack Arkwright	8	Ken Roberts
Bob Dagnall	9	Trevor Roberts
Cliff Watson	10	Ron Morgan
John Tembey	11	Peter Norburn
Dick Huddart	12	Dick Bonser
Bill Major	13	Albert Blan (c)
7	score	4
7	HT	0
	Scorers	
	Tries	
Tom van Vollenhoven (1)	T	
	Goals	
Kel Coslett (2)	G	Albert Blan (2)
	G	
	Drop Goals	
	DG	
Referee		M. Coates (Pudsey)

Scoring - Try = three (3) points - Goal = two (2) points - Drop goal = two (2) points

=== The road to success ===
First round
Whitehaven	2
Oldham	11
Rochdale Hornets	11
Barrow	3
Blackpool Borough	32
Salford	9
St. Helens	22
Liverpool City	0
Swinton	5
Widnes	2
blank
blank
Workington Town	43
Leigh	2
Wigan	11
Warrington	3

Second round
Oldham	14
Rochdale Hornets	3
Blackpool Borough	3
St. Helens	14
Swinton
bye
Workington Town	16
Wigan	8

Semi-finals
Oldham	8
St. Helens	10
Swinton	24
Workington Town	5

Final
St. Helens	7
Swinton	4

== Notes and comments ==
- Central Park was the home ground of Wigan with a final capacity of 18,000, although the record attendance was 47,747 for Wigan v St Helens 27 March 1959.

== See also ==
- 1962–63 Northern Rugby Football League season
- Rugby league county cups
