= Ronald Morgan =

GB & Wales international rugby league footballer

Ron Morgan
Personal information
- Full name: Ronald Morgan
- Born: 21 January 1936 (age 89); Bradford, England

Playing information

Rugby union
Club
Years	Team	Pld	T	G	FG	P
≤1961–61	Ebbw Vale

Rugby league
- Position: Prop, Second-row
Club
Years	Team	Pld	T	G	FG	P
1961–≥64	Swinton	90	18	0	0	54
≥1964–≥68	Leeds
	Total	90	18	0	0	54
Representative
Years	Team	Pld	T	G	FG	P
1963	Wales	1	0	0	0	0
1963–68	Great Britain	4	1	0	0	3
- Source: As of 28 April 2009

Ronald "Ron" Morgan (born 21 January 1936) is an English-born Welsh rugby union, and professional rugby league footballer who played in the 1960s and 1970s. He played club level rugby union (RU) for Ebbw Vale, and representative level rugby league (RL) for Great Britain and Wales, and at club level for Swinton and Leeds as prop, or second-row.

== Background ==
Ron Morgan was born in Bradford, West Riding of Yorkshire, England, he has Welsh ancestors, and eligible to play for Wales due to the grandparent rule.

== Playing career ==
=== International honours ===
Ron Morgan won caps for Wales (RL) while at Leeds in 1963 against England, and won caps for Great Britain (RL) while at Swinton in 1963 against France and Australia; With Leeds in 1968 against France, and New Zealand.

=== County honours ===
Ron Morgan won one cap for Yorkshire (RL) while at Swinton in 1963–64 season.

=== Championships appearances ===
Ron Morgan played in Swinton's victories in the Championship during the 1962–63 season and the 1963–64 season

=== County Cup Final appearances ===
Ron Morgan played at prop and was sent-off in Swinton's 4–7 defeat by St. Helens in the 1962–63 Lancashire Cup Final during the 1962–63 season at Central Park, Wigan on Saturday 27 October 1962.

=== Club career ===
Ron Morgan made his début for Swinton, and scored a hat-trick of tries against Liverpool Stanley on Saturday 7 October 1961, and he was transferred from Swinton to Leeds Rhinos for a transfer fee of £4500 c. 1964 (based on increases in average earnings, this would be approximately £218,900 in 2017),

== Genealogical information ==
Ron Morgan is the son of the rugby union and rugby league footballer; Bill Morgan, and the nephew of a rugby league footballer who played for Wigan.
