= Bill Holliday =

Former GB international rugby league footballer and coach

Personal information
- Full name: William Holliday
- Born: 4 July 1939 (age 85); Whitehaven, England

Playing information
- Position: Prop, Second-row
Club
Years	Team	Pld	T	G	FG	P
≤1959–65	Whitehaven
1965–68	Hull Kingston Rovers	143+2	18	140	0	334
1968–72	Swinton	94	5	59	0	133
1972–74	Rochdale Hornets	67	3	180	0	369
	Total	306	26	379	0	836
Representative
Years	Team	Pld	T	G	FG	P
1963–68	Cumberland	9	0	19	0	38
1964–67	Great Britain	10	0	6	0	12

Coaching information
Club
Years	Team	Gms	W	D	L	W%
1986–87	Swinton	12	3	1	8	25
- Relatives: Les Holliday (son)

William Holliday (born 4 July 1939) is a former professional rugby league footballer who played in the 1950s, 1960s and 1970s, and coached in the 1980s. He played at representative level for Great Britain, and at club level for Whitehaven, Hull Kingston Rovers, Swinton and Rochdale Hornets, as a prop, or second-row, and coached at club level for Swinton (jointly with Mike Peers).

== Background ==
Bill Holliday was born in Whitehaven, Cumberland, England.

== Playing career ==
=== Whitehaven ===
Holliday started his career with Whitehaven. In January 1965, he was transfer listed for a fee of £8,000 due to the club's financial difficulties, and was subsequently signed by Hull Kingston Rovers. He is a Whitehaven Hall of Fame inductee.

=== Hull Kingston Rovers ===
Holliday played at second-row in Hull Kingston Rovers' 25–12 victory over Featherstone Rovers in the 1966 Yorkshire Cup Final during the 1966–67 season at Headingley, Leeds on Saturday 15 October 1966, played left-prop in Hull Kingston Rovers' 8-7 victory over Hull F.C. in the 1967 Yorkshire Cup Final during the 1967–68 season at Headingley, Leeds on Saturday 14 October 1967.

=== Swinton ===
Holliday signed for Swinton in September 1968 for a fee of £6,000. He played at second-row in Swinton's 11–2 victory over Leigh in the 1969 Lancashire Cup Final during the 1969–70 season at Central Park, Wigan on Saturday 1 November 1969, and appeared as a substitute (replacing Second-row Rod Smith) in the club's 11–25 defeat by Salford in the 1972 Lancashire Cup Final during the 1972–73 season at Central Park, Wigan on Saturday 21 October 1972.

=== Rochdale Hornets ===
In November 1972, Holliday was transferred to Rochdale Hornets for a fee of £1,000. He played at prop and scored two conversions in Rochdale Hornets' 16–27 defeat by Warrington in the 1973–74 Player's No.6 Trophy Final during the 1973–74 season at Central Park, Wigan on Saturday 9 February 1974. Holliday had secured the quarter-final victory for Rochdale over Leeds with a drop goal from just inside the attacking half to give Hornets a 7 points to 5 lead.

=== International honours ===
Bill Holliday won caps for Great Britain while at Whitehaven in 1964 against France, in 1965 against France, New Zealand (3 matches), while at Hull Kingston Rovers in 1966 against France, France (sub), and in 1967 against Australia (3 matches). Bill Holliday captained Great Britain in 1967 against Australia (3 matches).

== Personal life ==
Bill Holliday is the father of the rugby league footballer; Les Holliday, and the rugby league footballer who played in the 1980s for Swinton and Leigh; Mike Holliday.
