= Paul Quinn (rugby league, born 1938) =

Australian RL coach and former Australia international rugby league footballer

Personal information
- Born: 28 March 1938 Gerringong, New South Wales, Australia
- Died: 19 June 2015 (aged 77) Canberra, Australian Capital Territory, Australia

Playing information
- Position: Prop
Club
Years	Team	Pld	T	G	FG	P
1961–63	Gerringong
1964–67	Newtown	65	4	0	0	12
1968	Nowra
	Total	65	4	0	0	12
Representative
Years	Team	Pld	T	G	FG	P
1962–??	Southern Division
1963–68	Country NSW	3	0	0	0	0
1963–65	New South Wales	9	0	0	0	0
1963–65	Australia	7	0	0	0	0
1965	City NSW	1	0	0	0	0

Coaching information
Representative
Years	Team	Gms	W	D	L	W%
1965	New South Wales	1	1	0	0	100

Paul Quinn (28 March 1938 – 19 June 2015) was an Australian rugby league footballer who played in the 1960s. An Australian international and New South Wales interstate representative forward, he played club football on the New South Wales South Coast as well in Sydney's NSWRFL Premiership with Newtown.

Gerringong forward Quinn first played representative rugby league for Southern Division against a touring Great Britain side in 1962, breaking into the Country NSW and New South Wales sides the following year. Also in 1963, he was first selected to represent Australia, becoming Kangaroo No. 384. Quinn then toured with the 1963-64 Kangaroos, playing in the 'Swinton Massacre' which secured the Ashes for Australia in England for the first time. Upon his return to Australia, he signed with Sydney club Newtown, playing for the team for four seasons in the NSWRFL Premiership and becoming captain. He played further Test matches in 1964 against France and also went on the 1965 tour of New Zealand.

Quinn returned to the South coast in 1968, playing for the Nowra club and also captaining Country NSW. After retiring he pursued a career as a sports journalist in Canberra.

In 2008, the centenary of rugby league in Australia, Quinn was named on the bench in the Newtown Jets 'Team of the Century'.

It was announced on the Newtown Jets Facebook page that Paul Quinn died in Canberra on 19 June 2015 aged 77.

Sporting positions
Preceded by Ian Walsh; 1965	Coach New South Wales; 1965	Succeeded by Noel Kelly; 1966
