= Ken Roberts (rugby league) =

English rugby league footballer and coach

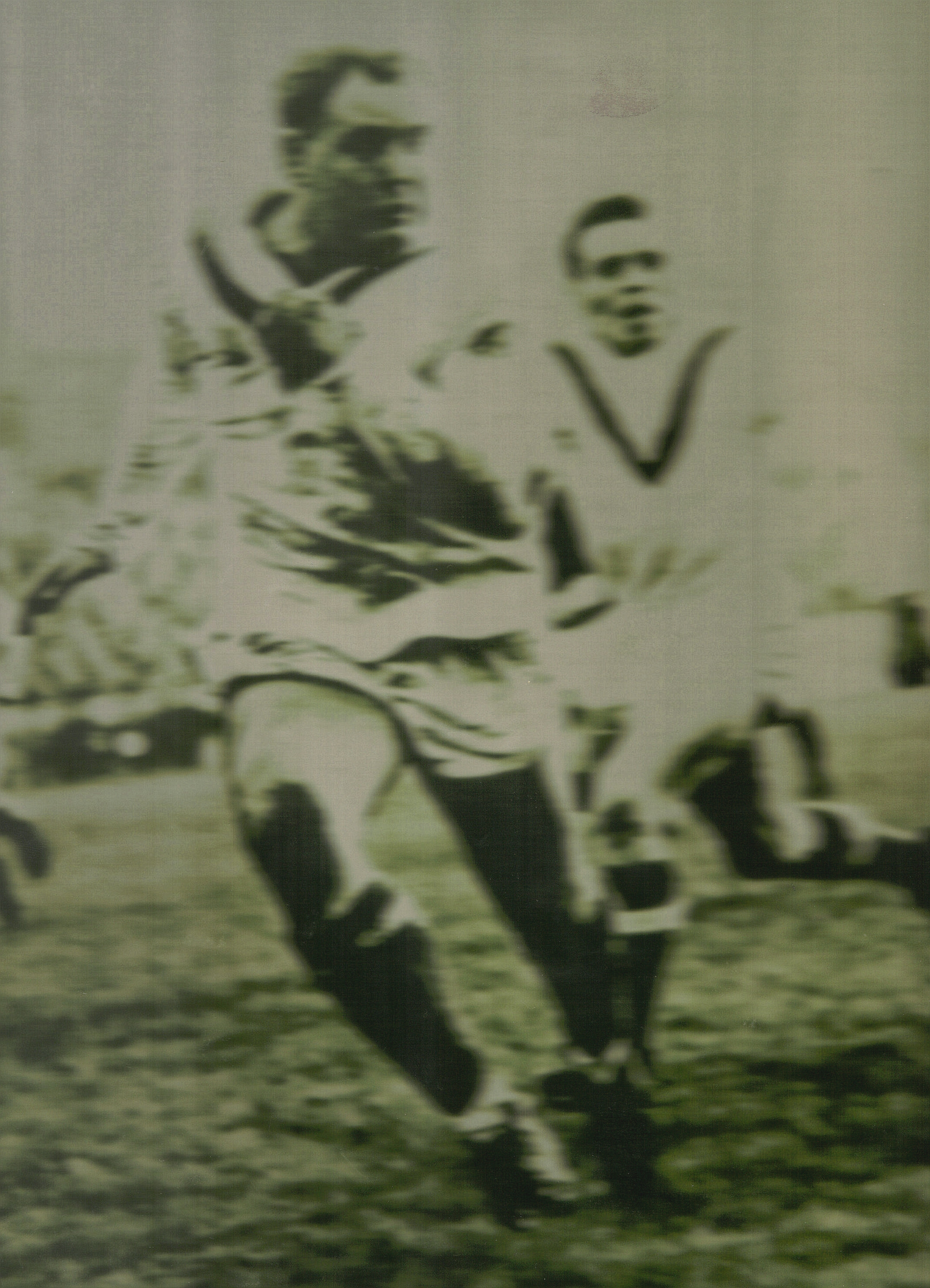

Personal information
- Full name: Kenneth Roberts
- Born: 2 October 1937 Atherton, Lancashire, England
- Died: 8 August 2017 (aged 79) Halifax, West Yorkshire, England

Playing information
- Height: 6 ft 1 in (1.85 m)
- Weight: 16 st 0 lb (102 kg)
- Position: Prop, Second-row
Club
Years	Team	Pld	T	G	FG	P
1956–63	Swinton	201	33	19	0	137
1963–67	Halifax	127	6	0	0	18
1967–68	Bradford Northern	40	3	0	0	9
1968–69	Rochdale Hornets	45	3	0	0	9
1969–71	Salford	29	0	0	0	0
	Total	442	45	19	0	173
Representative
Years	Team	Pld	T	G	FG	P
1959–65	Lancashire	5	0	0	0	0
1963–66	Great Britain	27	4	0	0	12
1961	Salford-Swinton	1	0	0	0	0

Coaching information
Club
Years	Team	Gms	W	D	L	W%
1982	Halifax	4	0	0	0	0

Kenneth Roberts (2 October 1937 – 8 August 2017) was an English rugby union and professional rugby league footballer who played in the 1950s, 1960s and 1970s. He played club level rugby union (RU) for Tyldesley RUFC (in Tyldesley, Wigan), and representative level rugby league (RL) for Great Britain and Lancashire, and at club level for Swinton, Halifax, Bradford Northern, Rochdale Hornets and Salford, as a prop, or second-row.

== Background ==
Ken Roberts was born in Atherton, Lancashire, England, and he died aged 79.

== Playing career ==
=== Club career ===
Ken Roberts made his début for Swinton on 10 March 1956, scoring a try and a goal from the second-row in a 25–7 victory at Blackpool Borough. He would go on to amass 128 points throughout his seven-year spell at the club. In 1960, 1961 and 1962 he played in three consecutive Lancashire Cup Finals for Swinton and was a member of their Lancashire League winning team during the 1960–61 season. Ken won the Championship with Swinton during the 1962–63 season, and on 23 April 1963, played his 202nd and last game for Swinton, a 17–4 victory over Oldham at Watersheddings, Oldham.

In 1963, Ken was transferred across the Pennines, for £5,000 to Halifax where, on 24 August, he made his début at Thrum Hall, Halifax against Featherstone Rovers. The same year, Halifax would win the Yorkshire Cup, beating Featherstone Rovers in the Final. 1964 saw Ken elected as vice-captain at Halifax, then soon after, captain. He was also a member of the team which beat Castleford 20–12 at Fartown to win the Eastern Division Championship that same year with him making 39 appearances including the Championship final where Halifax beat St Helens 15–7. The following season saw Halifax lose to St Helens in a repeat Championship Final at Swinton, and saw Ken make 36 appearances, including the fixture against New Zealand. On 27 January 1967, Ken played his last game for Halifax, against Leeds at Headingley.

The following week he walked out at Odsal in the Challenge Cup for Bradford Northern against Featherstone Rovers. Ken would play a total of 39 matches for Bradford before making his début for a victorious Rochdale Hornets, against York, including a try, on 17 August 1968.

In October 1969, Ken moved to his last club, Salford and he made his début on 29 October with a victory over St. Helens, at the Willows. Ken played his 475th and last first-class game on 20 October 1970 for Salford against Widnes in the BBC2 Floodlit Trophy.

=== County Cup Final appearances ===
Roberts appeared in three consecutive Lancashire County Cup finals for Swinton between 1960 and 1962. All three were defeats to St. Helens and all were played at Central Park, Wigan. He played left-second-row in the 9–15 defeat in the 1960 Lancashire Cup Final on Saturday 29 October 1960, played left-second row in the 9–25 defeat in the 1961 Lancashire Cup Final on Saturday 11 November 1961, and played left-prop in the 4–7 defeat in the 1962 Lancashire Cup Final on Saturday 27 October 1962.

=== Championship final appearances ===
Ken Roberts played in Halifax's 15–7 victory over St. Helens in the 1964–65 Championship Final during the 1964–65 season at Station Road, Swinton on Saturday 22 May 1965.

=== International honours ===
Ken Roberts won caps for Great Britain whilst at Halifax, in 1963, against Australia where his début helped secure a 16–5 victory. He was also capped in 1964 against France (two matches), in 1965 against France, and New Zealand (three matches), and in 1966 against France, and New Zealand (two matches). In 1966, he also toured Australasia with Great Britain, playing in 19 matches including both Test matches against New Zealand, scoring four tries and captaining the touring side against Central Queensland, Newcastle, Southern New South Wales, Northern Division and Monaro. Ken was a committee member of the British Rugby League Lions Association

=== County honours ===
Ken Roberts won five caps for Lancashire between 1959 and 1965 against Yorkshire, Cumberland and New Zealand.

He also appeared for a combined Salford-Swinton side that played a representative match against the touring New Zealand side in August 1961.

== Coaching career ==
Roberts joined the coaching staff at Halifax. After a period as coach of the A team, he was appointed coach of the first team in June 1982 but resigned in September of the same year, after only four matches of the 1982–1983 season, all of which Halifax lost.

== Honoured at Halifax ==
Ken Roberts made 27 appearances for Great Britain, 10 in Test matches, and is the only Halifax player to have captained a Great Britain XIII. Ken Roberts is a Halifax Hall of Fame Inductee.
