= Hervé Larrue =

French rugby union and rugby league player (1935–2026)

Personal information
- Born: 5 July 1935 Boissezon, France
- Died: 16 June 2026 (aged 90) Perpignan, France

Playing information
- Height: 1.88 m (6 ft 2 in)
- Weight: 215 lb (98 kg)

Rugby league
- Position: Lock
Club
Years	Team	Pld	T	G	FG	P
?–?	XIII Catalan	?	?	?	?	?
Representative
Years	Team	Pld	T	G	FG	P
1964–1964	France	1	0	0	0	0

Rugby union
- Position: Lock
Club
Years	Team	Pld	T	G	FG	P
?–?	US Carmaux	?	?	?	?	?
Representative
Years	Team	Pld	T	G	FG	P
1960–1960	France	7	1			3

Hervé Larrue (French pronunciation: [ɛʁvˈe laʁˈy]; 5 July 1935 – 16 June 2026) was a French rugby league and rugby union player.

In rugby league, he played for XIII Catalan and made one international appearance for France, while in rugby union he played for US Carmaux and had seven international caps for France.

Larrue died in Perpignan on 16 June 2026, at the age of 90.
