= Earl Harrison (baseball) =

American baseball player

- Pitcher
- Born: March 24, 1900; St. Louis, Missouri
- Died: August 15, 1953 (aged 53); St. Louis, Missouri

Negro league baseball debut
- 1927, for the St. Louis Stars

Last appearance
- 1930, for the Kansas City Monarchs
- Stats at Baseball Reference

Teams
- St. Louis Stars (1927); Homestead Grays (1929); Kansas City Monarchs (1930)

Earl Melvin Harrison (March 24, 1900 – August 15, 1953) was an American Negro league pitcher from 1927 to 1930.

A native of St. Louis, Missouri, Harrison made his Negro leagues debut with the St. Louis Stars in 1927. He went on to play for the Homestead Grays and Kansas City Monarchs through 1930. Harrison was shot and killed by Dock Booker in an argument over their respective baseball abilities.
