= Bernard Fabre =

France international rugby league player

Personal information
- Born: 7 September 1935 (age 90) Albi, Tarn, Occitania, France
- Height: 5 ft 8 in (1.73 m)
- Weight: 11 st 7 lb (73 kg)

Playing information
- Position: Centre, Five-eighth, Halfback
Club
Years	Team	Pld	T	G	FG	P
19??–??	Albi
19??–??	Bataillon de Joinville
19??–??	Albi
1966–??	Villefranche-de-Rouergue
	Total	0	0	0	0	0
Representative
Years	Team	Pld	T	G	FG	P
1957–64	France	23	2	0	0	6

Coaching information
Representative
Years	Team	Gms	W	D	L	W%
1967–69	Villefranche-de-Rouergue
- Source: As of 14 February 2021

Bernard Fabre (born in Albi, on 7 september 1935) is a French former rugby league footballer and coach in the 1950s, 1960s and 1970s. He played as halfback, five-eighths or centre.

== Career ==
Fabre was one of the main players of the France national team between 1957 and 1964. With Albi he made outstanding performances in the French Championship with two titles won in 1956 and 1962.

Thanks to his club-level performances, he was capped 23 times for France between 1957 and 1964, taking part at prestigious victories against Great Britain and Australia. He was as well the captain of the French team during their 1964 tour.

== Biography ==
Outside the pitch, he worked as a municipal employee.

== Honours ==
=== Rugby league ===
- Team honours
  - French Champion in 1956 and 1962 (Albi)
  - Runner-up at the French Championship in 1960 (Albi)
