= Gary Banks (rugby league) =

Australian rugby league player

Personal information
- Born: 1944 (age 80–81)

Playing information
- Position: Five-eighth
Club
Years	Team	Pld	T	G	FG	P
1967–69	North Sydney	43	5	0	1	17
Representative
Years	Team	Pld	T	G	FG	P
1966	New South Wales	5	1	0	0	3
1966	Australia	1	1	0	0	3

Gary Marjoribanks (born 1944), known as Gary Banks, is an Australian former rugby league player.

Banks was primarily a five-eighth, like his relative Bob Banks, a Kangaroos representative player. (Note: Either his cousin or uncle, depending on source)

In 1966, Banks was selected from Newcastle to play for Australia in the 1st Test against Great Britain at the SCG and scored a try for the Kangaroos, but still lost his place to John Gleeson for the remainder of the series.

Banks played first-grade for North Sydney from 1967 to 1969.
