= Kevin Smyth (rugby league) =

Australian rugby league footballer and coach

Personal information
- Full name: Kevin Smyth
- Born: 22 August 1932; Sydney, New South Wales, Australia
- Died: 22 August 2007 (aged 75)

Playing information
- Position: Lock, Second-row
Club
Years	Team	Pld	T	G	FG	P
1953	Parramatta	7	0	0	0	0
1957–60	Balmain	58	13	0	0	39
1961–64	Western Suburbs	67	17	0	0	51
	Total	132	30	0	0	90
Representative
Years	Team	Pld	T	G	FG	P
1963–64	Australia	2	0	0	0	0
- Source: As of 8 May 2019

Kevin Smyth (1932–2007) was an Australian rugby league footballer who played in the 1950s and 1960s. He played for Western Suburbs, Balmain and Parramatta in the New South Wales Rugby League (NSWRL) competition.

== Playing career ==
Smyth made his first grade debut for Parramatta in 1953. Smyth only made 7 appearances before departing the club. It wasn't until 1957 that Smyth made his next first grade appearance when he joined Balmain that year. Smyth spent 4 seasons at Balmain and became a regular within the team. The club only made the finals once in his time there in 1958 when they finished 4th.

In 1961, Smyth joined Western Suburbs. The club went on to finish 2nd that season just behind St George. Smyth played in the clubs gritty 7-5 victory over his former club Balmain in the preliminary final but cruelly missed out on playing in the grand final due to an injury as St George won their 6th straight premiership 22-0. In 1962, Western Suburbs again reached the grand final against St George. Smyth played at lock as Wests lost the match 9-6. In 1963, Western Suburbs reached their 3rd straight grand final against St George. Smyth played at lock as Wests lost 8-3. The match was remembered for the muddy conditions both sets of players had to endure and for the lasting image of St George player Norm Provan embracing Wests player Arthur Summons at full time.

In 1963 and 1964, Smyth was selected to play for Australia and featured in two tests against France. Smyth left Western Suburbs in 1964 and went on to become captain-coach of Southern Districts. Smyth later joined Illawarra Collegians and spent 4 years there. Smyth was captain-coach in 1967 as Illawarra Collegians won their inaugural premiership.
