= John Tembey =

GB international rugby league footballer

Personal information
- Full name: John Tembey
- Born: 11 September 1936 Whitehaven district (Kells), Cumberland, England
- Died: 29 July 1994 (aged 57) Whitehaven, England

Playing information
- Position: Prop, Second-row
Club
Years	Team	Pld	T	G	FG	P
≤1962–62	Whitehaven
1962–65	St. Helens	137	20	0	0	60
1965–66	Warrington	13	0	0	0	0
1966–66	Whitehaven	13	0	0	0	0
	Total	163	20	0	0	60
Representative
Years	Team	Pld	T	G	FG	P
1959–64	Cumberland	7	2	0	0	6
1963–64	Great Britain	2	0	0	0	0

John Tembey (11 September 1936 – 29 July 1994) was an English professional rugby league footballer who played in the 1960s. He played at representative level for Great Britain and Cumberland, and at club level for Whitehaven (two spells), St Helens and Warrington, as a prop or second-row.

== Background ==
John Tembey's birth was registered in Whitehaven district (Kells), Cumberland, England, and he died aged 57.

== Playing career ==
=== International honours ===
John Tembey won caps for Great Britain while at St. Helens in 1963 against Australia, and in 1964 against France.

=== County honours ===
John Tembey represented Cumberland.

=== County Cup Final appearances ===
John Tembey played left-second-row in St. Helens' 7–4 victory over Swinton in the 1962 Lancashire Cup Final during the 1962–63 season at Central Park, Wigan on Saturday 27 October 1962, played left-prop in the 15–4 victory over Leigh in the 1963 Lancashire Cup Final during the 1963–64 season at Station Road, Swinton on Saturday 26 October 1963, and played left-prop in the 12–4 victory over Swinton in the 1964 Lancashire Cup Final during the 1964–65 season at Central Park, Wigan on Saturday 24 October 1964.

=== Notable tour matches ===
John Tembey played left-centre and scored a try in Whitehaven's 14–11 victory over Australia in the 1956–57 Kangaroo tour of Great Britain and France match at the Recreation Ground, Whitehaven on Saturday 20 October 1956, in front of a crowd of 10,917.

== Honoured at Whitehaven ==
John Tembey is a Whitehaven Hall of Fame Inductee.
