= Barry Rushworth =

Australian rugby league player (1941–2026)

Personal information
- Full name: Barry Rushworth
- Born: 23 August 1941 Lithgow, New South Wales, Australia
- Died: 29 October 2026 (aged 85)

Playing information
- Position: Centre
Club
Years	Team	Pld	T	G	FG	P
1964–71	Parramatta	104	25	0	0	75
Representative
Years	Team	Pld	T	G	FG	P
1963–64	New South Wales	2	3	0	0	9
1964	Australia	1	1	0	0	3

Barry Rushworth (23 August 1941 – 29 October 2026) was an Australian professional rugby league footballer who played in the 1960s and 1970s. He played his entire career for Parramatta as a centre and also represented Australia and New South Wales.

== Playing career ==
Rushworth was a Lithgow junior and was selected to play for New South Wales in 1963 and for Australia in 1964 as they toured France and Europe. Rushworth only featured in one game on the tour scoring a try in a 18-6 victory over France at the Parc des princes. On his return to Australia, Rushworth was signed by Parramatta. In Rushworth's first season at Parramatta, the club went from easy beats of the competition to finishing second during the regular season under coach Ron Lynch. Parramatta went one win from making the grand final that year but lost to Balmain in the preliminary final.

Also in 1964, Rushworth made his final appearance for New South Wales scoring a try in a 31-5 thrashing of Queensland. The following season in 1965, Parramatta qualified for the finals again but were beaten in the first week of the playoffs by Souths. Over the following years, Parramatta hovered around the middle to lower table of the competition which culminated in another wooden spoon at the end of 1970. Rushworth played on in 1971 but was not a part of the side which reached the finals that year. He was a member of the Western Division team that famously won the inaugural Amco Cup in 1974. In 2007, Rushworth was inducted into the Parramatta hall of fame.

== Death ==
Rushworth died on 29 October 2026, at the age of 85.
