= Earl Harrison (rugby league) =

Playing information
- Position: Five-eighth
Club
Years	Team	Pld	T	G	FG	P
19??–??	Gilgandra
Representative
Years	Team	Pld	T	G	FG	P
1963–65	Country NSW	3	0	0	0	0
1963–65	New South Wales	5	2	0	0	6
1963	Australia	9	3	0	0	9

Earl Harrison is an Australian former professional rugby league footballer who played in the 1960s. A New South Wales state and Australia national representative five-eighth, he played his club football in Country NSW for Gilgandra.

After gaining selection for the Country New South Wales rugby league team and then the New South Wales team in 1963, Harrison made his international debut for Australia against the visiting New Zealand side, becoming Kangaroo No. 378.

Harrison was selected to go on the 1963–64 Kangaroo tour of Great Britain and France. On that tour he was part of the first all-Australian side to win the rugby league Ashes in England, playing at five-eighth in all three Tests against Great Britain and he played in one Test against France.
