= Richard Evans (rugby league) =

Wales international rugby league footballer

Personal information
- Full name: Richard Evans
- Born: 26 January 1945 (age 81) St. Helens, England

Playing information
- Position: Hooker
Club
| Years | Team | Pld | T | G | FG | P |
|---|---|---|---|---|---|---|
| | Huyton |
| 1969–70 | Barrow |
| 1970–77 | Swinton | 196 | 2 | 3 | 1 | 14 |
| 1977–78 | Salford | 47 | 4 | 0 | 0 | 12 |
| | Total | 243 | 6 | 3 | 1 | 26 |
Representative
| Years | Team | Pld | T | G | FG | P |
| 1973–75 | Lancashire | 6 | 0 | 0 | 0 | 0 |
| 1975–78 | Wales | 5 | 0 | 0 | 0 | 0 |

Richard "Dick" Evans (born 26 January 1945) is an English-born former rugby league footballer who played in the 1970s. He played at representative level for Wales, and at club level for Huyton, Barrow, Swinton and Salford, as a hooker.

== Playing career ==
Born in St Helens, Lancashire, Evans started his rugby league career at Huyton. He was signed by Barrow in April 1969.

In December 1970, Evans was signed by Swinton for a fee of £5,000.

== International honours ==
Although born in England, Evans was eligible to play for Wales due to his Welsh ancestry. He won caps for Wales while at Swinton in the 1975 Rugby League World Cup against France (2 matches).
