= Milton Huddart =

England international rugby league footballer

Personal information
- Full name: Richard Milton Jackson Huddart
- Born: 7 October 1960 Prescot district, England
- Died: 14 March 2015 (aged 54) Whitehaven, England

Playing information
- Position: Loose forward
Club
Years	Team	Pld	T	G	FG	P
1981–85	Whitehaven
1985–86	Carlisle
1986	Canberra Raiders
1986–87	Leigh	25	1		1	5
1988–89	Whitehaven
	Total	25	1	0	1	5
Representative
Years	Team	Pld	T	G	FG	P
1985–88	Cumbria	3	0	0	0	0
1984	England	1	0	0	0	0
- Father: Dick Huddart

Milton Huddart (7 October 1960 – 14 March 2015), also known by the nickname of "Milt", was an English professional rugby league footballer who played in the 1980s. He played at representative level for England and Cumbria (captain), and at club level for Kells A.R.L.F.C., Whitehaven, Carlisle, Canberra Raiders and Leigh as a loose forward.

== Background ==
Milton Huddart was born in Prescot, Lancashire, England, he was the son of Great Britain Rugby League international Dick Huddart. Milt was an avid cyclist and keep fit fanatic, but on 13 March 2015 he suffered a cardiac arrest whilst cycling to work and was treated at West Cumberland Hospital prior to being transferred to Cumberland Infirmary later that morning. Despite successful surgery, Milton died on Saturday 14 March 2015.His wife and daughter were with him.

== Playing career ==
=== Club career ===
Huddart made his début for Whitehaven against Fulham in January 1981. In February 1985 Huddart was transferred to Carlisle for £20,000 (based on increases in average earnings, this would be approximately £70,700 in 2013)

Huddart spent the 1986 NSWRL season with the Canberra Raiders.

He was later transferred from Carlisle to Leigh, and he made his début for Leigh against Hull Kingston Rovers alongside the New Zealand international Centre James Leuluai, he played in Leigh's 8-14 defeat by St. Helens in the 1987 Challenge Cup semi-final during the 1986–87 season at Central Park, Wigan on Saturday 14 March 1987, and played and scored a drop goal in Leigh's 17-10 victory over Warrington at Wilderspool Stadium to avoid relegation during the 1986–87 season.

Huddart re-signed for Whitehaven in 1988, with the club paying Leigh a £10,000 fee, decided by a tribunal.

=== Representative honours ===
Huddart won a cap for England while at Whitehaven in 1984 against Wales.

Huddart won cap(s) for Cumbria including as captain in the 12-48 defeat by Australia during the 1986 Kangaroo tour of Great Britain and France at Craven Park, Barrow-in-Furness on Tuesday 21 October 1986.
