= Bill Morgan (rugby) =

Wales international rugby league & union footballer

Personal information
- Full name: William C. Morgan
- Born: 17 March 1905 Ebbw Vale, Wales
- Died: unknown

Playing information

Rugby union
- Position: Forward
Club
Years	Team	Pld	T	G	FG	P
1926–31	Newport RFC	129	8

Rugby league
- Position: Prop
Club
Years	Team	Pld	T	G	FG	P
1930–33	Wigan	100	8	2		24
1933–37	Bradford Northern	137	5	0		15
	Total	237	13	2	0	39
Representative
Years	Team	Pld	T	G	FG	P
1932	Wales	1	0	0	0	0

William Morgan (17 March 1905 – death unknown) was a Welsh rugby union and professional rugby league footballer who played in the 1920s and 1930s. He played club level rugby union (RU) for Newport RFC, as a forward, and representative level rugby league (RL) for Wales, and at club level for Wigan, as a prop.

== Background ==
Bill Morgan was born in Ebbw Vale, Wales.

== Playing career ==
=== International honours ===
Bill Morgan played at prop in Wales' (RL) 2–19 defeat by England at The Willows, Salford on Wednesday 27 January 1932.

=== Notable tour matches ===
Bill Morgan played at prop in Wigan's 4–10 defeat by Australia at Central Park, Wigan, on Saturday 23 September 1933.

=== Club career ===
Bill Morgan played in Newport RFC's 3–20 defeat by New South Wales Waratahs during the 1927–28 Waratahs tour of the British Isles, France and Canada at Rodney Parade, Newport, Wales on Thursday 22 September 1927. Bill Morgan made his début for Wigan and scored a try in the 51–5 victory over Rochdale Hornets at Central Park, Wigan on Thursday 25 December 1930, scored his last try for Wigan in the 45–5 victory over Wakefield Trinity at Central Park, Wigan on Monday 2 January 1933, and he played his last match for Wigan in the 6–7 defeat by Broughton Rangers at Belle Vue Stadium, Belle Vue, Manchester on Saturday 28 October 1933.

== Personal life ==
Bill Morgan was the father of the rugby union and rugby league footballer; Ronald Morgan.
