= Bill Morgan (outfielder/shortstop) =

American baseball player (1856–1908)

- Outfielder/Shortstop/Catcher
- Born: 1856; Brooklyn, New York, U.S.
- Died: September 7, 1908 (aged 51–52); New York, New York, U.S.
- Batted: Unknown Threw: Unknown

MLB debut
- 1882, for the Pittsburgh Alleghenys

Last MLB appearance
- July 23, 1884, for the Washington Nationals

MLB statistics
- Batting average: .167
- Home runs: 0
- Runs scored: 20
- Stats at Baseball Reference

Teams
- Pittsburgh Alleghenys (1882–1883); Washington Nationals (1884)

William Morgan (1856 – September 7, 1908) was a 19th-century American professional baseball outfielder, shortstop and catcher.
