= 1966 Great Britain Lions tour =

- Date: 1 June 1966 – 23 August 1966
- Manager: Wilf Spaven; J. Errock
- Tour captain(s): Harry Poole
- Top point scorer(s): Ken Gowers (134)
- Top try scorer(s): Berwyn Jones (24)
Summary
P	W	D	L
Total
30	21	0	9
Test match
5	3	0	2
Opponent
P	W	D	L
Australia
3	1	0	2
New Zealand
2	2	0	0

Tour chronology
- Previous tour: 1962
- Next tour: 1970

The 1966 Great Britain Lions tour was the Great Britain national rugby league team's 13th tour of Australasia and took place from June to August 1966. A total of 30 matches were played against local club and representative sides during the tour, including a three match Test match series against Australia and a two-game series against New Zealand.

Great Britain failed to regain The Ashes against Australia following their home defeat in 1963, but had more success on the New Zealand leg of the tour, winning all eight games.

== Touring squad ==
The 26-man touring squad was announced on 23 March 1966, with Harry Poole named as captain, and Ken Gowers selected as vice-captain. A few days later, Alex Murphy withdrew from the squad due to business commitments, and was replaced by Ian Brooke. Murphy's withdrawal meant that Brian Edgar was the only member of the squad who had toured previously with the Lions.

== Results ==
=== Australia ===
1 June 1966

Northern Territory	7 – 17	Great Britain

Darwin

4 June 1966

Far North Queensland	7 – 48	Great Britain

Cairns

5 June 1966

North Queensland	17 – 15	Great Britain

Townsville

8 June 1966

Central Queensland	10 – 5	Great Britain

Rockhampton

11 June 1966

Sydney	14 – 15	Great Britain

Sydney

13 June 1966

Newcastle	2 – 5	Great Britain

Newcastle

15 June 1966

NSW North Coast	20 – 52	Great Britain

Kempsey

18 June 1966

New South Wales	18 – 13	Great Britain

Sydney

19 June 1966

Southern NSW	17 – 8	Great Britain

Wollongong

==== First Test ====
25 June 1966

Australia	13 – 17	Great Britain
Tries: Banks; Goals: Barnes (5)		Tries: Burgess, Hardisty, Watson; Goals: Keegan (3); Drop goals: Bishop

Sydney Cricket Ground, Sydney
Attendance: 57,962
Referee: Jack Bradley

26 June 1966

Northern NSW	15 – 13	Great Britain

Tamworth

29 June 1966

Brisbane	19 – 17	Great Britain

Brisbane

2 July 1966

Queensland	29 – 38	Great Britain

Brisbane

3 July 1966

Wide Bay/Burnett	22 – 30	Great Britain

Bundaberg

7 July 1966

Ipswich	10 – 44	Great Britain

Ipswich

10 July 1966

Toowoomba	10 – 38	Great Britain

Toowoomba

==== Second Test ====
16 July 1966

Australia	6 – 4	Great Britain
Goals: Barnes (3)		Goals: Keegan (2)

Lang Park, Brisbane
Attendance: 45,057
Referee: Col Pearce

17 July 1966

Western NSW	11 – 38	Great Britain

Parkes

==== Third Test ====
23 July 1966

Australia	19 – 14	Great Britain
Tries: Irvine (3), King, Lynch; Goals: Johns (2)		Tries: Hardisty (2); Goals: Gowers (4)

Sydney Cricket Ground, Sydney
Attendance: 63,503
Referee: Col Pearce

24 July 1966

Riverina	20 – 34	Great Britain

Narrandera

26 July 1966

Balmain	9 – 8	Great Britain

Sydney

31 July 1966

Monaro	12 – 33	Great Britain

Cooma

=== New Zealand ===
3 August 1966

Waikato	8 – 47	Great Britain

Huntly

==== First Test ====
6 August 1966

New Zealand	8 – 25	Great Britain
Tries: Christian, Mincham; Goals: Kennedy		Tries: Brooke, Burgess, Clarke, Myler, Watson; Goals: Gowers; Drop goals: Gowers

Carlaw Park, Auckland
Attendance: 14,494
Referee: John Percival

9 August 1966

Wellington	9 – 28	Great Britain

Wellington

11 August 1966

West Coast	5 – 27	Great Britain

Greymouth

13 August 1966

Canterbury	6 – 53	Great Britain

Christchurch

15 August 1966

Taranaki	17 – 51	Great Britain

New Plymouth

==== Second Test ====
20 August 1966

New Zealand	14 – 22	Great Britain
Goals: Wiggs (7)		Tries: Brooke (2), Aspinall, Burgess; Goals: Gowers (5)

Carlaw Park, Auckland
Attendance: 10,657
Referee: John Percival

23 August 1966

Auckland	11 – 12	Great Britain

Auckland
