= Billy Morgan (footballer, born 1896) =

English footballer

Personal information
- Full name: William Morgan
- Date of birth: 16 December 1896
- Place of birth: Burnley, England
- Date of death: 1993 (aged 96 or 97)
- Height: 5 ft 8 1/2 in (1.74 m)
- Position: Wing half

Senior career*
Years	Team	Apps	(Gls)
- Royal Navy
1921–1924	Burnley	28	(0)
- * Club domestic league appearances and goals

William Morgan (16 December 1896 – 1993) was an English professional footballer who played as a wing half.
