= Bill Morgan (producer) =

Canadian journalist (1940–2020)

William John Morgan (September 19, 1940 – November 16, 2020) was an Australian Canadian journalist, best known as a television producer for CBC News.

== Career ==
Morgan was born in Geelong, Australia, and immigrated to Canada from Great Britain in 1967. In the late 1960s, he was editor of the Brandon Sun newspaper.

He was producer of local news and current affairs program, 24Hours on CBWT for its first season (1970–1971), and became Executive Producer in the second.

Morgan was part of an internal CBC task force that met in July, 1979 to study moving The National to 10 p.m. Later that year he was also involved in the CRTC application for the proposed CBC-2 service. The National was moved to 10 p.m. in January 1982, however the application for a second CBC television network was denied in early 1981.

In early 1982, Morgan was named director of news and current affairs of the CBC. He used this experience as a template to help create CBC's The Journal in the 1980s.

In the early 1990s Morgan became the CBC's ombudsman. He died in Toronto, Canada.
