= Dave Robinson (rugby league) =

GB & England international rugby league player (1944–2022)

Personal information
- Full name: David Robinson
- Born: 1 August 1944 Swinton, Lancashire, England
- Died: 29 September 2022 (aged 78)

Playing information
- Position: Second-row, Loose forward
Club
Years	Team	Pld	T	G	FG	P
1963–70	Swinton	177 (Note: Figures aggregate both spells at Swinton)	30			96
1970–76	Wigan	143	17	0	0	51
1976–77	Swinton
	Total		47	0	0	147
Representative
Years	Team	Pld	T	G	FG	P
1965–74	Lancashire	9	3	0	0	9
1965	Great Britain U–24	1	0	0	0	0
1968–69	England	2	0	0	0	0
1965–70	Great Britain	13	1	0	0	3

David Robinson (1 August 1944 – 29 September 2022) was an English professional rugby league footballer who played in the 1960s and 1970s. He played at representative level for Great Britain, England and Lancashire, and at club level for Swinton and Wigan, as a second-row or loose forward.

== Background ==
Dave Robinson was a pupil at Moorside Secondary Modern School in his hometown of Swinton, near Manchester.

== Playing career ==
=== Club career ===
Robinson signed for Swinton in May 1963, making his first team debut in March 1964 and stayed with the club until January 1970 when he was transferred to Wigan. During this period with Swinton he played loose forward in the 11–2 victory over Leigh in the 1969 Lancashire Cup Final at Central Park, Wigan on Saturday 1 November 1969.

Robinson spent six years at Wigan including appearing in a Challenge Cup final defeat to Castleford in his first season at Wigan and a defeat to St Helens in the Championship Final in the following season. He was part of the team that won the 1973 Lancashire Cup beating Salford 19–9 in the Finalat Wilderspool Stadium, Warrington, on Saturday 13 October 1973.

In February 1976 Robinson returned to Swinton before retiring from the game in March 1977.

=== International honours ===
Robinson won a cap for England while at Swinton in 1969 against Wales, and won caps for Great Britain while at Swinton in 1965 against New Zealand, in 1966 against France (2 matches), on the 1966 Great Britain Lions tour against Australia (3 matches), New Zealand (2 matches), in 1967 against France (2 matches), Australia (2 matches), and while at Wigan in 1970 against Australia.
