= Eric Clay =

British rugby league referee

Personal information
- Born: 19 May 1922 Leeds, West Riding of Yorkshire, England
- Died: 3 October 2007 (aged 85) Leeds, West Yorkshire, England

Refereeing information
Years	Competition	Apps
1953–72	Rugby Football League Championship
1959–69	Internationals

Eric Clay (19 May 1922 – 3 October 2007) was a British rugby league referee popularly known as "Sergeant Major" for his style during games.

== Early life, private life ==
Born in Leeds, West Riding of Yorkshire, Clay was educated at Hunslet Carr Primary School and Jack Lane School. During the Second World War, Clay was a Warrant Officer in the RAF. He was married with two daughters.

== Professional career ==
A leading referee, Albert Dobson, suggested that Clay try refereeing. Aged 25, he began in the Leeds and District League in 1947.

It was while refereeing a reserve match as a curtain-raiser to the 1952 Challenge Cup semi-final that Clay's "authoritative presence" was noted. After that he was elevated quickly from Grade 5 to Grade 2, and took charge of his first senior games in 1953–54.

Clay had a distinctive style. He was a "big, even heavy man, he did not race around the field like his modern successors, but he had a knack of being in the right place at the right time to defuse trouble, in a game that was much more violent then than it is now".

Clay became widely recognised due to his regular Saturday afternoon appearances on Grandstand during the 1960s, although he is often better remembered as the Sergeant Major. This nickname, conferred by broadcaster Eddie Waring, "captured the way he controlled a game, like a battle-hardened veteran showing the raw recruits who was in charge".

Two of the major games refereed by Clay were Challenge Cup finals at Wembley, between Wakefield Trinity and Hull F.C. in 1960 and Featherstone Rovers and Barrow in 1967. These were the only two Challenge Cup finals to have been attended by Queen Elizabeth II.

Clay was the referee when Great Britain last won the Ashes on home soil in 1959.

Clay was also popular in France, where he was asked to officiate the final of the 1967 Lord Derby Cup between Carcassonne and XIII Catalan in Perpignan.

=== 1963 Ashes ===
Clay's most controversial match was the third test of the 1963 Ashes series between Great Britain and Australia played at Headingley, Leeds, in which the two sides set about settling scores and the Australians felt Clay was biased. It is considered was one of the most brutal Tests ever played, with two Australians and one British player, Cliff Watson, being sent off. Barry Muir, one of the Kangaroos sent off (for kicking) later told that he first told Clay "where to go" as he left the field, and later approached Clay after the game and said to him "You robbed us". Clay reportedly responded with "Barry, I've got to live here" (Australia had already won the Ashes for the first time on British soil since 1911–12 and had Great Britain lost the final game it would have been the first time, either as England or Great Britain, that the Lions had lost the series 3–0 on home soil).

Australia's captain in that Ashes series, St George hooker Ian Walsh, later commented that Clay was brought in by the Rugby Football League to prevent the Lions losing a home series 3–0. Walsh also claimed that Australia had done the same thing the year before with Sydney referee Darcy Lawler making some controversial decisions (including allegedly telling Ken Irvine to re-set a kick at goal so he would not miss. Lawler denied doing so and Irvine never revealed if he had) in the third test of the 1962 series at the Sydney Cricket Ground in Australia. Lawler had also earlier awarded Irvine a try when he appeared to have knocked on, and his goal, thanks to the advice from Lawler, saw Australia win the test 18–17 and prevent Great Britain from winning the series 3–0.

== Retirement from Rugby League ==
After his retirement from refereeing, Clay concentrated on his other job as company secretary of an engineering firm in Leeds. Despite his name remaining one of the best-known in the game, he was rarely seen at rugby league events. There was one exception to that – when Alex Murphy was appointed OBE in 1999, he insisted on the man who sent him off three times accompanying him to Buckingham Palace as one of his guests.

== Death ==
Eric Clay died in Wheatfields Hospice, Leeds after a short illness. He was 85. A funeral service was held at Rawdon Crematorium on Friday, 12 October 2007 at 12.20pm.

Dave Hadfield wrote in The Independent "Even though he had been retired from refereeing for 35 years by the time of his death, "Sergeant Major" Eric Clay remained the most memorable and instantly recognisable figure ever to officiate at rugby league matches in Britain".
