= 1963–64 Northern Rugby Football League season =

1963–64 Rugby Football League season
- League: Championship

First Division
- Champions: Swinton
- Runners-up: Wigan
- Top point-scorer: Neil Fox 313
- Top try-scorer: John Stopford 45

Second Division
- Second Division Champions: Oldham
- Runners-up: Leigh
- Disbanded: Bradford Northern

The 1963–64 Northern Rugby Football League season was the 69th season of rugby league football.

== Season summary ==
The 1963–64 season saw the league continue to be split into two divisions with each team playing each other team home and away and no playoffs.

Swinton won their sixth Championship.

The Challenge Cup winners were Widnes who beat Hull Kingston Rovers 13–5 in the final.

The 2nd Division Champions were Oldham

Bradford Northern disbanded on 10 December 1963 after playing 13 matches which were then declared null and void, and expunged from the 1963–64 season's records. They had won 1 and lost 12. Their last match on 23 November attracted a club record lowest crowd of just 324 against Barrow.

There was no promotion or relegation as the League returned to one division in 1964–65.

Brian Bevan ended his career with Warrington and Blackpool Borough as the all-time record try scorer with 796.

St. Helens won the Lancashire League and Halifax won the Yorkshire League. St. Helens beat Leigh 15–4 to win the Lancashire County Cup and Halifax beat Featherstone Rovers 10–0 to win the Yorkshire County Cup.

== Championship ==
	Team	Pld	W	D	L	Pts
1	Swinton	30	25	0	5	50
2	Wigan	30	21	2	7	44
3	St. Helens	30	20	1	9	41
4	Featherstone Rovers	30	18	1	11	37
5	Workington Town	30	18	1	11	37
6	Castleford	30	18	0	12	36
7	Wakefield Trinity	30	16	0	14	36
8	Halifax	30	15	1	14	31
9	Hull Kingston Rovers	30	15	0	15	30
10	Warrington	30	15	0	15	30
11	Hunslet	30	14	0	16	28
12	Widnes	30	13	0	17	26
13	Leeds	30	10	0	20	20
14	Huddersfield	30	10	0	20	20
15	Keighley	30	5	0	25	10
16	Hull	30	4	0	24	8

== Second Division ==
	Team	Pld	W	D	L	F	A	Pts
1	Oldham	24	21	1	2	508	168	43
2	Leigh	24	16	2	6	411	224	34
3	Dewsbury	24	15	2	7	239	220	32
4	Barrow	24	14	1	9	351	280	29
5	Bramley	24	14	0	10	300	256	28
6	Blackpool Borough	24	12	1	11	299	303	25
7	York	24	12	0	12	317	250	24
8	Rochdale Hornets	24	8	1	15	209	271	17
9	Liverpool City	24	8	1	15	200	261	17
10	Batley	24	8	0	16	174	304	16
11	Whitehaven	24	8	0	16	173	341	16
12	Salford	24	8	0	16	218	392	16
13	Doncaster	24	7	1	16	182	311	15

== Challenge Cup ==
Widnes beat Hull Kingston Rovers 13–5 in the Challenge Cup played at Wembley Stadium on 9 May before a crowd of 84,488.

This was Widnes’ third Challenge Cup Final win in five Final appearances. Frank Collier, their prop forward, was awarded the Lance Todd Trophy for his man-of-the-match performance.

== County championships ==
=== Western Division ===
Pos	Team	Pld	W	D	L	PF	PA	PAv	Pts	Qualification
1	Swinton	8	8	0	0	190	34	5.588	16	Qualification for the play-offs
2	St Helens	8	8	0	0	173	57	3.035	16	Qualification for the play-offs
3	Oldham	8	7	0	1	119	52	2.288	14	Qualification for the play-offs
4	Widnes	8	6	1	1	101	68	1.485	13	Qualification for the play-offs
5	Workington Town	8	5	2	1	141	63	2.238	12	
6	Wigan	8	6	0	2	201	95	2.116	12	
7	Warrington	8	5	0	3	143	84	1.702	10	
8	Barrow	8	2	0	6	103	143	0.720	4	
9	Leigh	8	2	0	6	59	93	0.634	4	
10	Blackpool Borough	8	2	0	6	90	222	0.405	4	
11	Whitehaven	8	1	2	5	40	128	0.313	4	
12	Rochdale Hornets	8	1	1	6	61	149	0.409	3	
13	Salford	8	0	0	8	59	190	0.311	0	
14	Liverpool City	8	0	0	8	41	143	0.287	0	

==== Final ====
16 May 1964

St Helens	10 – 7	Swinton
Tries: Northey, French; Goals: Coslett (2)		Tries: Stopford; Goals: Blan (2)

Central Park, Wigan
Attendance: 17,363
Referee: Eric Clay (Leeds)

=== Eastern Division ===
Due to Bradford's withdrawal from the league, not all teams played the same number of games, so league position was determined by win percentage.

Pos	Team	Pld	W	D	L	PF	PA	PAv	PCT	Qualification
1	Castleford	6	6	0	0	145	44	3.295	100.00	Qualification for the play-offs
2	Halifax	8	7	0	1	153	65	2.354	87.50	Qualification for the play-offs
3	Wakefield Trinity	6	5	0	1	159	37	4.297	83.33	Qualification for the play-offs
4	Bramley	8	6	0	2	80	61	1.311	75.00	Qualification for the play-offs
5	Leeds	6	4	0	2	72	60	1.200	66.67	
6	Featherstone Rovers	8	4	1	3	126	90	1.400	56.25	
7	Huddersfield	6	3	0	3	84	51	1.647	50.00	
8	Hull Kingston Rovers	8	4	0	4	105	86	1.221	50.00	
9	Hull	8	4	0	4	92	89	1.034	50.00	
10	Hunslet	8	4	0	4	101	130	0.777	50.00	
11	Dewsbury	8	3	0	5	56	90	0.622	37.50	
12	Doncaster	8	2	0	6	56	162	0.346	25.00	
13	York	8	1	1	6	85	162	0.525	18.75	
14	Keighley	8	1	0	7	64	123	0.520	12.50	
15	Batley	8	1	0	7	80	208	0.385	12.50	
16	Bradford Northern (Note: Withdrew from the league mid-season.)	0	0	0	0	0	0	—	—	

==== Final ====
23 May 1964

Halifax	20 – 12	Castleford
Tries: Jackson (2), Robinson, Dixon; Goals: James (4)		Tries: Howe, Dickinson; Goals: Clark (3)

Fartown, Huddersfield
Attendance: 10,798
Referee: R. L. Thomas (Oldham)

== Kangaroo tour ==
The months from September until November also saw the appearance of the Australian team in England on their 1963–64 Kangaroo Tour. Other than the three test Ashes series against Great Britain (won 2–1 by Australia), The Kangaroos played 19 matches against Rugby Football League clubs and county representative sides.

== Sources ==
- Saxton, Irvin (ed.). History of Rugby League: No.69 1963–1964. League Publications.
- 1963-64 Rugby Football League season at wigan.rlfans.com
- The Challenge Cup at The Rugby Football League website
