= Phil Kitchin =

Former Great Britain international rugby league footballer

Personal information
- Full name: Philip Kitchin
- Born: second ¼ 1941 (age 83–84); Whitehaven district, England

Playing information
- Position: Stand-off
Club
| Years | Team | Pld | T | G | FG | P |
|---|---|---|---|---|---|---|
| 1958–67 | Whitehaven |
| 1967–71 | Workington Town |
| | Whitehaven |
| | Total | 0 | 0 | 0 | 0 | 0 |
Representative
| Years | Team | Pld | T | G | FG | P |
| | Cumberland |
| 1965 | Great Britain U-24 | 1 | 0 | 0 | 0 | 0 |
| 1965 | Great Britain | 1 | 0 | 0 | 0 | 0 |

Coaching information
Club
| Years | Team | Gms | W | D | L | W% |
| 1980–81 | Whitehaven |
| 1986–87 | Whitehaven |
| 1989 | Workington Town |
| | Total | 0 | 0 | 0 | 0 |
Representative
| Years | Team | Gms | W | D | L | W% |
| 1990 | Cumbria |

Philip Kitchin (birth registered second ¼ 1941) is an English former professional rugby league footballer who played in the 1950s and 1960s, and coached in the 1980s. He played at representative level for Great Britain and Cumberland, and at club level for Whitehaven and Workington Town as a stand-off, and coached at representative level for Cumbria, and at club level for Whitehaven and Workington Town.

== Background ==
Phil Kitchin's birth was registered in Whitehaven district, Cumberland, England.

== Playing career ==
=== Club career ===
Kitchin started his career at Whitehaven before signing for Workington Town in February 1967 for a fee of £2,000. He was re-signed by Whitehaven in January 1971 for a fee of £1,000.

=== Representative honours ===
Phil Kitchin won caps for Cumberland while at Whitehaven, making his début aged-19 alongside; Brian Edgar, Dick Huddart, Syd Lowdon, William "Bill" McAlone and Ike Southward, against Yorkshire at Recreation Ground, Whitehaven circa-1960.

On 3 April 1965, Kitchin played in the first ever Great Britain under-24 international match in a 17–9 win against France under-24's.

Kitchin won a cap for Great Britain while at Whitehaven in 1965 against New Zealand.

== Honoured at Whitehaven ==
Phil Kitchin is a Whitehaven Hall Of Fame Inductee, i.e. one of the "Haven immortals".
