= Hensingham A.R.L.F.C. =

English amateur rugby league club

Hensingham ARLFC

Club information
- Full name: Hensingham; Amateur Rugby League Football Club
- Colours: Black; Red
- Founded: 1900; 126 years ago

Current details
- Ground: Cleator Moor Road, Hensingham, Whitehaven, CA28 8TX,
- Coach: Kris Coward
- Competition: NCL Division Two

Uniforms
Home colours

Hensingham ARLFC is an amateur Rugby league club based in Whitehaven. Founded in 1900, It wasn't until 1920 that the Club changed its allegiances to Rugby League. Hensingham are one of the oldest rugby clubs in the country. They now play their rugby in the NCL Division Two.

== History ==
The history of Hensingham is long. The clubs presence in rugby circles being unbroken for over a century.

Founded in 1900 and has a long of providing many sportsmen through the delivery of coaching for young people in area. Their present site has been developed since 1973.

They began in a rundown shed known locally as “the Chicken Shed”, and became more succesulf.

=== National Conference league ===
Hensingham ARLFC were elected to enter the Kingstone Press National Conference league in 2019 along with two other teams Heworth A.R.L.F.C. and Batley Boys ARLFC.

They will be the fourth West Cumbrian club to be accepted into membership of the Conference, joining town rivals Kells A.R.L.F.C., And fellow West Cumbrian rivals Wath Brow and Egremont form the 2019 season. Hensingham will play in division 3.

Hensingham gained promotion to NCL division 2 in the 2024 season. Finishing second in the league behind East Leeds. It will be the first time the club has competed at NCL division 2 level.

== Youth Team ==
Within the Youth Section they run team at all age groups from U6s through to U18s

In the Under-16 cup, it was Hensingham who ran out 26–20 winners to lift the West Cumbria Youth League trophy after a tight game with town rivals Kells.

Hensingham u13's won League Champions trophy and League Cup and the Grand Final. 2019

In the season 2019 Hensingham played against an Australian touring side Kincumber Colts the Australians won 24.-4

== Former notable players ==
- Lee Mossop
- Kyle Amor
- Sol Roper
- Jon Roper
- Alan McCurrie
- Vincent Gribbin
- Joseph Bonnar
- Bob Nicholson
- Stephen Holgate
- Jason Mossop
- Matt Jimmy Dalton

== Honours ==
- BARLA Cumbria Cup: 1990-91, 1993-94, 2002-03, 2017–18
- Cumberland League: 1925-26, 1988-89, 1993-94, 1994-95, 1995-96 2002-2003, 2003-2004
- Cumberland County Cup: 1927-28, 2017-18
- Alliance Championship: 2001–02
- Cumbria Men's League: 2017
