= Syd Lowdon =

English rugby league footballer

Personal information
- Full name: Sidney A. Lowdon
- Born: first ¼ 1936 Whitehaven, England
- Died: 27 February 2017 (aged 81)

Playing information
- Position: Wing, Centre
Club
Years	Team	Pld	T	G	FG	P
1954–57	Whitehaven	108			315
1957–59	Salford
1959–≥62	Workington Town	179				548
	Total	287	0	0	315	548
Representative
Years	Team	Pld	T	G	FG	P
	Cumberland	20

Sidney "Syd" A. Lowdon (first ¼ 1936 – 27 February 2017) was an English rugby union, and professional rugby league footballer who played in the 1950s and 1960s. He played rugby union (RU) for British Army whilst on National Service alongside; Great Britain (RL) players Billy Boston, Phil Jackson and Mick Sullivan and Scotland (RU) player Ken Scotland, and representative level rugby league (RL) for Cumberland.At club level for Whitehaven (captain), Salford and Workington Town, as a wing or centre.

== Background ==
Syd Lowdon's birth was registered in Whitehaven district, Cumberland, England. He worked as a butcher (at the Co-op in Salford c. 1957–59), and he died aged 81.

== Playing career ==
=== County honours ===
Syd Lowdon won 20-caps for Cumberland (RL).

=== Challenge Cup semi-Final appearances ===
Syd Lowdon played at centre in Whitehaven's 9-10 defeat by Leeds in the 1957 Challenge Cup semi-final during the 1956–57 season at Odsal Stadium, Bradford on Saturday 30 March 1957, in front of a crowd of 49,094.

=== Western Division Championship Final appearances ===
Syd Lowdon played, and scored the equalizing drop goal in Workington Town's 9-9 draw with Widnes in the 1962 Western Division Championship Final during the 1961–62 season, and played in the 10-0 victory over Widnes in the 1962 Western Division Championship Final replay during the 1961–62 season at Central Park, Wigan.

=== Notable tour matches ===
Syd Lowdon played on the wing (opposite Australia's Clive Churchill), was captain, and created two tries in Whitehaven's 14-11 victory over Australia in the 1956–57 Kangaroo tour of Great Britain and France match at the Recreation Ground, Whitehaven on Saturday 20 October 1956, in front of a crowd of 10,917.

=== Club career ===
Syd Lowdon had trials at association football (soccer) clubs; Blackpool F.C. and Leeds United F.C., before eventually joining Whitehaven, whilst on National Service, in 1954 for a signing-on fee of £3,000 (based on increases in average earnings, this would be approximately £185,600 in 2015), with which he bought a Triumph TR2, following a disagreement with new Whitehaven coach; Eppie Gibson, he moved from Whitehaven to play for coach Gus Risman at Salford in 1957 for a transfer fee of £5,250 (based on increases in average earnings, this would be approximately £275,100 in 2015).

== Honoured at Whitehaven R.L.F.C. ==
Syd Lowdon, is an Whitehaven R.L.F.C. Hall of Fame inductee, i.e. one of the "Haven immortals".

== Outside of sport ==
Syd Lowdon was on his way to see the Joe Loss Orchestra at Maryport, following the match against St. Helens at Recreation Ground, Whitehaven on Wednesday 3 April 1957, when a wheel sheared from its axle causing his Austin Healey sports car to crash on a bend opposite Workington Golf Club in 1957, he had concussion, but his passenger Dougie Dixon of Kells escaped unharmed, however the car was a write-off.

== Note ==
There is a disparity in the spelling of Syd's forename and surname on the FreeBMD birth registration, and marriage registration entries; his name is spelled as Sidney Lowden the birth registration entry, and Sydney Lowdon the marriage registration entry.
