= Gary Murdock =

Scotland international rugby league footballer & coach

Personal information
- Full name: Gary Murdock
- Born: 6 January 1968 (age 58)

Playing information
- Position: Scrum-half
Club
Years	Team	Pld	T	G	FG	P
1987–94	Carlisle	137	20	0	0	80
1990–91	Swinton	3	0	0	0	0
1995–96	Whitehaven	9	0	0	0	0
1999–2000	Workington Town	7	0	0	0	0
	Total	156	20	0	0	80
Representative
Years	Team	Pld	T	G	FG	P
1988–92	Cumbria	3	1	0	0	4
1996	Scotland	2	0	0	0	0

Coaching information
Club
Years	Team	Gms	W	D	L	W%
2000–02	Workington Town
2009	Cockermouth Titans
	Total	0	0	0	0

Gary Murdock (born 6 January 1968) is a former Scotland international rugby league footballer, and coach. He played at club level for Carlisle, Swinton, Whitehaven and Workington Town, and coached at club level for Workington Town, and the Cockermouth Titans.

== International honours ==
Gary Murdock won caps for Scotland while at Ellenborough Rangers 1996 1-cap (sub).
