= William McAlone =

English rugby league footballer

Bill McAlone
Personal information
- Full name: William Henry McAlone
- Born: c. 1927
- Died: 25 March 2020 (aged 93)

Playing information
- Position: Prop
Club
Years	Team	Pld	T	G	FG	P
1950–60	Whitehaven RLFC	327	23	0	0	69
Representative
Years	Team	Pld	T	G	FG	P
1954–59	Cumberland	11	0	0	0	0

William "Bill" McAlone was a professional rugby league footballer who played in the 1950s and 1960s. He played for Whitehaven. He played in a forward position. McAlone scored 23 tries in 327 games for Whitehaven.

== Playing career ==
=== Club career ===
McAlone joined Whitehaven from Kells in 1950.

McAlone played at prop in Whitehaven's 14–11 victory over Australia in the 1956–57 Kangaroo tour of Great Britain and France match at the Recreation Ground, Whitehaven on Saturday 20 October 1956, in front of a crowd of 10,917.

McAlone was awarded a benefit season in 1959–60, receiving a cheque for £810. He announced his retirement the following season.

=== County honours ===
McAlone represented Cumberland 11 times.

== Honoured at Whitehaven ==
Bill McAlone is a Whitehaven Hall of Fame Inductee, in 2006 he became the third player to be inducted.
