= 2009 Whitehaven R.L.F.C. season =

Whitehaven, the English professional rugby league team from Whitehaven, Cumbria, competed in the second-tier competition of British rugby league, the 2009 Co-operative Championship.

== Table ==
2009 Co-operative Championship
Pos	Team	Pld	W	D	L	PF	PA	PD	BP	Pts	Qualification
1	Barrow Raiders	20	13	0	7	632	361	+271	5	44	Qualified for the play-offs
2	Halifax	20	13	0	7	714	476	+238	4	43	Qualified for the play-offs
3	Sheffield Eagles	20	11	0	9	635	447	+188	9	42	Qualified for the play-offs
4	Widnes Vikings	20	11	0	9	649	438	+211	6	39	Qualified for the play-offs
5	Whitehaven	20	12	0	8	565	567	−2	3	39	Qualified for the play-offs
6	Featherstone Rovers	20	12	0	8	619	524	+95	1	37	Qualified for the play-offs
7	Gateshead Thunder	20	9	2	9	610	657	−47	3	32	
8	Batley Bulldogs	20	8	2	10	536	620	−84	6	32	
9	Leigh Centurions	20	9	0	11	426	572	−146	5	32	Relegated
10	Toulouse Olympique XIII	20	9	0	11	556	582	−26	3	30 (Note: Toulouse were exempt from relegation.)	
11	Doncaster	20	1	0	19	257	955	−698	−4	−1 (Note: Doncaster had 5 bonus points, but lost 9 competition points for entering administration.)	Relegated

Source: www.cooperativechampionship.co.uk and Rugby-League.com
Rules for classification: 1st on league points; 2nd on match points difference.

== 2009 Fixtures and results ==
Competition	Round	Opponent	Result	Score	Home/Away	Venue	Attendance	Date
Northern Rail Cup	-	Batley Bulldogs	Win	52-30	Home	Recreation Ground	1,146	15/02/2009
Northern Rail Cup	-	York City Knights	Loss	36-6	Away	Huntington Stadium	685	18/02/2009
Northern Rail Cup	-	Workington Town	Win	26-12	Home	Recreation Ground	1,349	22/02/2009
Northern Rail Cup	-	Leigh Centurions	Loss	24-22	Away	LSV	1,789	01/03/2009
Challenge Cup	3	Gateshead Thunder	Loss	42-38	Away	Gateshead International Stadium	501	08/03/2009
Co-operative Championship	1	Gateshead Thunder	Win	40-18	Home	Recreation Ground	1,175	15/03/2009
Co-operative Championship	2	Featherstone Rovers	Win	26-52	Away	Chris Moyles Stadium	1,555	22/03/2009
Co-operative Championship	3	Toulouse Olympique	Win	40-26	Home	Recreation Ground	1,224	28/03/2009
Co-operative Championship	4	Barrow Raiders	Loss	18-12	Away	Craven Park	2,910	10/04/2009
Co-operative Championship	5	Halifax	Loss	18-24	Home	Recreation Ground	2,005	13/04/2009
Co-operative Championship	6	Featherstone Rovers	Loss	16-44	Home	Recreation Ground	1,411	19/04/2009
Co-operative Championship	8	Toulouse Olympique	Loss	38-12	Away	Stade des Minimes	2,300	02/05/2009
Co-operative Championship	9	Widnes Vikings	Win	26-22	Home	Recreation Ground	2,102	07/05/2009
Co-operative Championship	10	Gateshead Thunder	Win	34-38	Away	Gateshead International Stadium	575	17/05/2009
Co-operative Championship	11	Batley Bulldogs			Away	Mount Pleasant		24/05/2009
Co-operative Championship	12	Doncaster			Home	Recreation Ground		31/05/2009
Co-operative Championship	13	Sheffield Eagles			Away	Don Valley Stadium		14/06/2009
Co-operative Championship	14	Leigh Centurions			Home	Recreation Ground		28/06/2009
Co-operative Championship	16	Barrow Raiders			Home	Recreation Ground		16/07/2009
Co-operative Championship	17	Doncaster			Away	Keepmoat Stadium		26/07/2009
Co-operative Championship	18	Sheffield Eagles			Home	Recreation Ground		02/08/2009
Co-operative Championship	19	Halifax			Away	Shay Stadium		09/08/2009
Co-operative Championship	20	Batley Bulldogs			Home	Recreation Ground		16/08/2009
Co-operative Championship	21	Widnes Vikings			Away	Stobart Stadium Halton		22/08/2009
Co-operative Championship	22	Leigh Centurions			Away	Leigh Sports Village		06/09/2009
