= Jimmy Hayton =

England international rugby league footballer

James Hayton
Personal information
- Full name: James Armstrong Fisher Hayton
- Born: 21 September 1925 Cockermouth
- Died: 2000 (aged 74) Whitehaven, Cumbria, England

Playing information
- Position: Prop
Club
Years	Team	Pld	T	G	FG	P
≤1948–≥55	Workington Town
Representative
Years	Team	Pld	T	G	FG	P
1946–55	Cumberland	17	0	0	0	0
1949	England	1	0	0	0	0

James "Jimmy" Armstrong Fisher Hayton (21 September 1925 – 2000) was an English professional rugby league footballer who played in the 1940s and 1950s. He played at representative level for England and Cumberland, and at club level for Workington Town, as a prop.

== Playing career ==
=== International honours ===
Jimmy Hayton won a cap for England while at Workington in 1949 against Other Nationalities.

=== County honours ===
Jimmy Hayton represented Cumberland. Jimmy Hayton played at prop in Cumberland's 5–4 victory over Australia in the 1948–49 Kangaroo tour of Great Britain and France match at the Recreation Ground, Whitehaven on Wednesday 13 October 1948, in front of a crowd of 8,818.

=== Challenge Cup Final appearances ===
Jimmy Hayton played at prop in Workington Town's 18–10 victory over Featherstone Rovers in the 1952 Challenge Cup Final during the 1951–52 season at Wembley Stadium, London on Saturday 19 April 1952, in front of a crowd of 72,093, and played at prop in the 12–21 defeat by Barrow in the 1955 Challenge Cup Final during the 1954–55 season at Wembley Stadium, London on Saturday 30 April 1955, in front of a crowd of 66,513.
