= Jimmy Dalton =

GB international rugby league footballer

Personal information
- Full name: Matthew James Dalton
- Born: c. 1963 Hensingham, Whitehaven, Cumberland, England
- Died: 2016 (aged 53) Whitehaven, Cumberland, England

Playing information
- Position: Wing
Club
Years	Team	Pld	T	G	FG	P
1983–87	Whitehaven	87	33	0	0	132
Representative
Years	Team	Pld	T	G	FG	P
1985	Cumbria	1	0	0	0	0
1985–86	Great Britain U-21	3	0	0	0	0

Matthew James Dalton (c. 1963 – 2016) was an English professional rugby league footballer. He played at representative level for Great Britain (under-21s), and at club level for Hensingham ARLFC and Whitehaven R.L.F.C., as a wing, and he is a member of Whitehaven R.L.F.C. Immortals (Hall of Fame).

== Career ==
Dalton was capped for Great Britain against France in 1986. His career ended due to Castleman’s syndrome . Later, he was diagnosed with Pyrin Associated Febrile Syndrome. Besides working at Starting Point, he was also working the switchboard and security at West Cumberland Hospital.

Dalton started his rugby league career at Amateur side Hensingham ARLFC with his brothers he signing for Whitehaven R.L.F.C. soon after.

== Death ==
Dalton was found dead in Crow Park, Whitehaven on 8 November 2016, after people had been searching for him for two days. In a suicide note to his family, Dalton referenced the toll of both physical and mental health issues as well as having broken up with his on-and-off partner of ten years, Gail Lamb. At the time of his death, he was 53 years old.

Dalton was the father of two children and had four grandchildren. He was considered influential in setting up Starting Point in Whitehaven. He helped people there in the road to recovery from drug and alcohol problems.
