= Mark Beckwith (rugby league) =

English rugby league footballer

Personal information
- Born: 7 August 1964 (age 61); Cumberland, England

Playing information
- Position: Hooker
Club
Years	Team	Pld	T	G	FG	P
1984–88	Whitehaven
1989–90	Barrow
1991–92	Whitehaven
	Total	0	0	0	0	0
Representative
Years	Team	Pld	T	G	FG	P
1986	Great Britain U-21	2
1992	Cumbria	1	0	0	0	0

Mark Beckwith (born 7 August 1964) is an English former professional rugby league footballer who played for Whitehaven and Barrow. He made two appearances for Great Britain under-21s in 1986, and also represented Cumbria.

In 1998, he played for amateur club Egremont Rangers in their fourth round Challenge Cup tie against Workington Town, scoring a try in a surprise 18–0 victory over their professional opponents.
