= Steve McCurrie =

GB & England international rugby league & union footballer

Personal information
- Full name: Stephen Craig McCurrie
- Born: 1 June 1973 (age 51); Whitehaven, Cumbria, England

Playing information

Rugby league
- Position: Prop, Hooker, Second-row
Club
Years	Team	Pld	T	G	FG	P
1989–96	Widnes Vikings	242	67	0	3	271
1998–01	Warrington Wolves	107	37	0	0	148
2002–04	Widnes Vikings
2005	Leigh Centurions	12	1	0	0	4
	Total	361	105	0	3	423
Representative
Years	Team	Pld	T	G	FG	P
1994	Cumbria	1	0	0	0	0
1995	England	3	0	0	0	0
1993	Great Britain	1	0	0	0	0

Rugby union
Club
Years	Team	Pld	T	G	FG	P
1996–98	Bedford RFC
- Father: Alan McCurrie

Steve McCurrie (born 1 June 1973) is an English former professional rugby league and rugby union footballer who played in the 1980s, 1990s and 2000s.

He played representative level rugby league for Great Britain, England and Cumbria, and at club level for Widnes Vikings (two spells), Warrington Wolves and the Leigh Centurions, as a prop, hooker or second-row, and club level rugby union for Bedford RFC.

== Early life ==
Born in Whitehaven, Cumbria, McCurrie was educated at Whitehaven School, and played junior rugby league for Hensingham. As a 16-year-old, he played two games for Lancaster-based rugby union club Vale of Lune during the 1989–90 season.

== Playing career ==
=== Club career ===
McCurrie decided to pursue a career in rugby league, and was signed by Widnes in 1989. He was a substitute in Widnes' 14-20 defeat by Wigan in the 1993 Challenge Cup Final during the 1992–93 season at Wembley Stadium, London on Saturday 1 May 1993.

In 1996, he switched codes to play rugby union for Bedford RFC, but returned to rugby league two years later and signed for Warrington Wolves.

=== International honours ===
Steve McCurrie won caps for England (RL) while at Widnes in the 1995 Rugby League World Cup against Wales (interchange/substitute), France (interchange/substitute), and Fiji (interchange/substitute), and a won cap for Great Britain (RL) while at Widnes in 1993 against France.

== Personal life ==
Steve McCurrie is the son of the rugby league footballer; Alan McCurrie.

== Outside of rugby league ==
Steve McCurrie now works as an Approved Driving Instructor in Widnes.
