= Stephen Holgate (rugby league) =

England international rugby league footballer (1971–2021)

Personal information
- Born: 15 December 1971 Whitehaven, Cumberland, England
- Died: 16 November 2021 (aged 49)

Playing information
- Position: Prop, Second-row
Club
Years	Team	Pld	T	G	FG	P
1994–96	Workington Town	69	7	0	0	28
1997–98	Wigan Warriors	53	3	0	0	12
1999	Hull Sharks	2	0	0	0	0
2000	Workington Town	3	0	0	0	0
2000	Halifax Blue Sox	13	0	0	0	0
2001	Widnes Vikings	26	4	0	0	16
	Total	166	14	0	0	56
Representative
Years	Team	Pld	T	G	FG	P
1994	Cumbria	1	0	0	0	0
1995	England	1	0	0	0	0

Stephen Holgate (15 December 1971 – 16 November 2021) was an English professional rugby league footballer who played in the 1990s and 2000s. He played at representative level for England and Cumbria, and at club level for Hensingham ARLFC (in Hensingham, Whitehaven), Workington Town, Wigan Warriors, Hull Sharks and Halifax in the Super League as a prop, or second-row.

Holgate started his career with Workington Town, and played for the club during the inaugural Super League season in 1996.

Holgate was signed by Wigan in December 1996 for a fee of £100,000. He played at second-row for the club in their 1998 Super League Grand Final victory over Leeds Rhinos.

He died on 16 November 2021, at the age of 49.
