= Jon Roper =

England international rugby league footballer

Personal information
- Full name: Jonathan Roper
- Born: 5 May 1976 (age 50) Workington, Cumbria

Playing information
- Position: Fullback, Wing, Centre, Stand-off, Loose forward
Club
Years	Team	Pld	T	G	FG	P
1994–2000	Warrington	131	51	83	0	370
2000	London Broncos	4	0	0	0	0
2000	Salford City Reds	5	1	3	0	10
2001	Castleford Tigers	14	7	12	0	52
2002	Leigh Centurions	30	18	2	0	76
2003	Rochdale Hornets	30	17	0	0	68
2004	Halifax	17	4	15	0	46
2004	Oldham	9	0	20	0	40
2005–07	Workington Town	37	9	41	1	119
	Total	277	107	176	1	781
Representative
Years	Team	Pld	T	G	FG	P
1994	Cumbria	1	0	0	0	0
1999	England	1	0	0	0	0

Jon Roper (born 5 May 1976) is an English former professional rugby league footballer who played as a centre, wing, stand-off and loose forward in the 1990s and 2000s.

He played at representative level for Cumbria and England, and at club level for Warrington Wolves, London Broncos, Salford City Reds, Castleford Tigers, Leigh Centurions, Rochdale Hornets, Halifax, Oldham and Workington Town. He played in numerous positions including; fullback, wing, centre, stand-off, or loose forward.

== International honours ==
Roper won a cap for England while at Warrington in 1999 against France. Roper also toured with Great Britain in 1996.

== Genealogical information ==
Jon Roper is the son of the rugby league wing who played in the 1980s for Workington Town; Tony Roper, and the grandson of the rugby league footballer; Sol Roper.
