= David Lowden =

English rugby league footballer

Dave Lowden
Personal information
- Full name: David Lowden
- Born: 19 April 1965 (age 61) Maryport, Cumberland, England

Playing information
- Position: fullback, Wing
Club
| Years | Team | Pld | T | G | FG | P |
|---|---|---|---|---|---|---|
| 1986–93 | Workington Town |
Representative
| Years | Team | Pld | T | G | FG | P |
| 1987–88 | Cumbria | 2 | 0 | 6 | 0 | 12 |

David Lowden is an English former professional rugby league footballer who played in the 1980s and 1990s. He played at representative level for Cumbria, and at club level for Workington Town, as a fullback or wing.

== Contemporaneous Article Extract ==
"David Lowden Full-back/winger. A stand-out player as a full-back for Workington, Lowden emerged as a successful winger as the good times came back to Derwent Park in 1990-91. A product of amateur League in Maryport, has represented Cumbria county at professional level, and was a Halbro Shooting Star winner in the '88-89 season."
