= Kyle Amor =

Sky Sports commentator and former Ireland international rugby league footballer

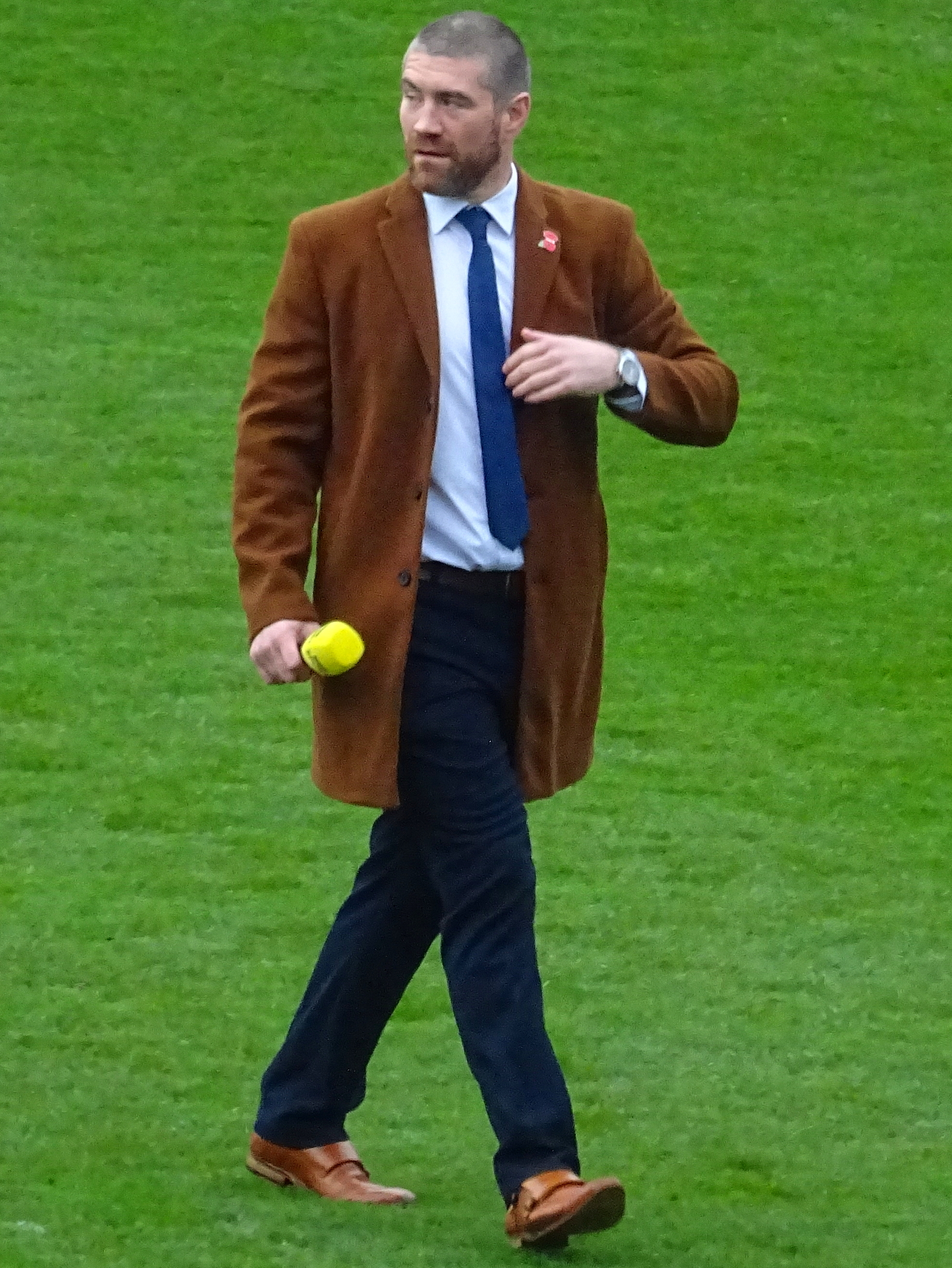

Personal information
- Full name: Kyle Joseph Amor
- Born: 26 May 1987 (age 38) Whitehaven, Cumbria, England
- Height: 6 ft 2 in (1.88 m)
- Weight: 16 st 5 lb (104 kg)

Playing information
- Position: Prop, Loose forward
Club
Years	Team	Pld	T	G	FG	P
2009	Whitehaven	24	7	0	0	28
2010–11	Leeds Rhinos	3	0	0	0	0
2010(loan)	→ Whitehaven	20	2	0	0	8
2011(loan)	→ Wakefield Trinity Wildcats	27	6	0	0	24
2012–13	Wakefield Trinity Wildcats	52	5	0	0	20
2014–22	St Helens	212	18	0	0	72
2022(loan)	→ Warrington Wolves	4	0	0	0	0
2023	Widnes Vikings	10	0	0	0	0
	Total	352	38	0	0	152
Representative
Years	Team	Pld	T	G	FG	P
2011–23	Ireland	5	1	0	0	4
2022	Cumbria	1	1	0	0	4

Coaching information
Club
Years	Team	Gms	W	D	L	W%
2024	Whitehaven	6	2	0	4	33
- Source: As of 3 October 2024

Kyle Amor (born 26 May 1987) is a TV broadcaster with Sky Sports and is a former Ireland international rugby league footballer who played most of his career with St Helens. Amor last played as a prop for the Widnes Vikings in the Championship for 10 games during the 2023 season before retiring mid-season in May 2023. Outside of Rugby League, Kyle is also an ambassador for Ortus Energy, a leading U.K. Solar company.

He took over as interim head-coach of Whitehaven RLFC on 19 Aug 2024, following the sudden and surprising resignation of Jonty Gorley., to be replaced later by Anthony Murray on 3 Oct 2024.

He played for Whitehaven in the Championship winning the competition Young Player of the Year award. Amor played for the Leeds Rhinos in the Super League, and on loan from Leeds at Whitehaven in the Championship and the Wakefield Trinity Wildcats in the Super League. He later joined Wakefield on a permanent deal, before joining Saints.

At St Helens he has won the Super League Grand Final four times; in 2014, 2019, 2020 & 2021 as well as the Super League League Leaders Shield in 2014, 2018 & 2019. Amor also featured off the bench in the 2019 Challenge Cup Final loss at Wembley Stadium to the Warrington Wolves. Amor came off the bench and scored the final try of the game in the 2021 Challenge Cup 26–12 victory over the Castleford Tigers

== Background ==
Amor was born in Whitehaven, Cumbria, England.

Amor is also a qualified science teacher which he achieved whilst being part-time at Widnes Vikings and alongside his TV presenting duties.

== Early career ==
He started his career playing amateur Rugby league for Hensingham ARLFC. Impressing throughout the amateur circles as a youngster representing BARLA U’21s in 2007 and Open Age level in 2008. He later signed form Hensingham ARLFC to Whitehaven R.L.F.C. in 2009 at the age of 21 years old.

== Playing career ==
=== Club career ===
==== Whitehaven ====
Amor began his career at home town club Whitehaven R.L.F.C.

==== Leeds Rhinos ====
He signed a full time contract with Leeds.

==== Wakefield Trinity ====
After failing to cement a first team spot at Leeds Rhinos he spent three seasons with Wakefield Trinity.

==== St Helens ====
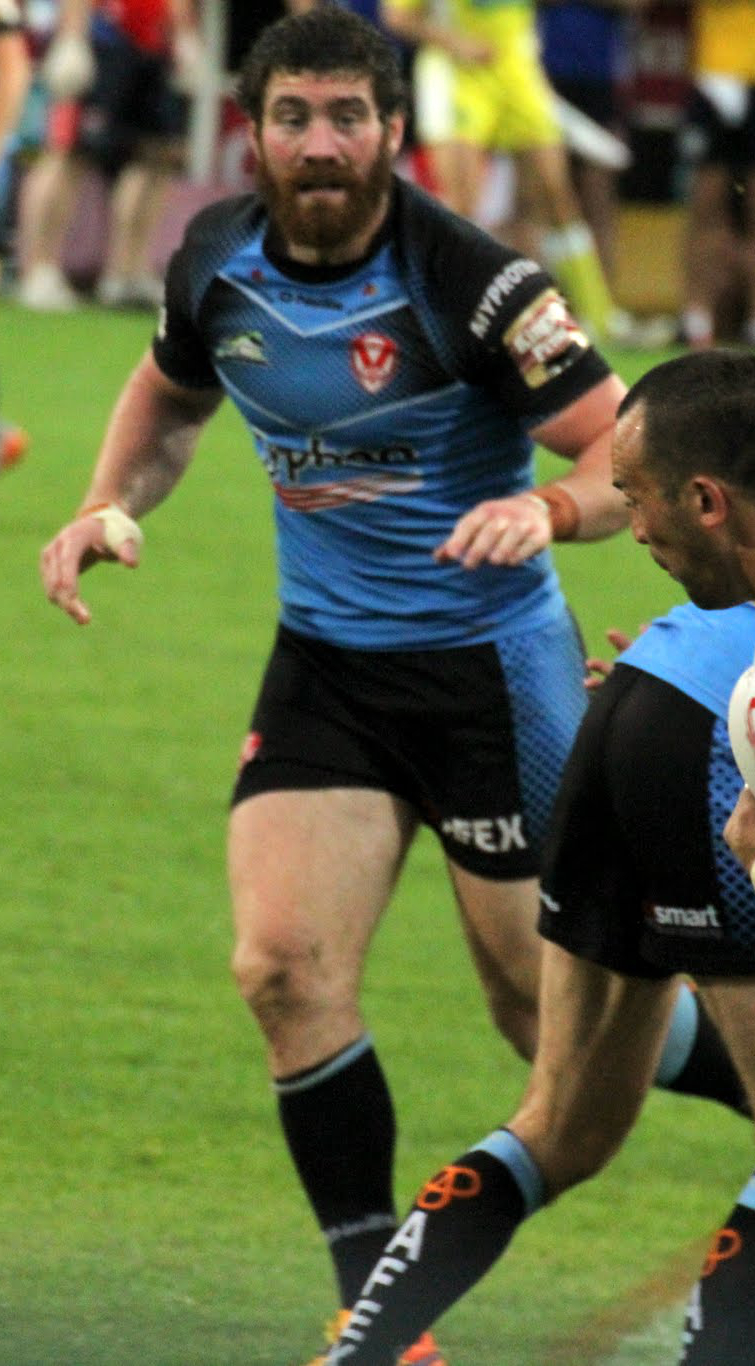
Amor playing for St Helens in 2015

He was announced as a St Helens player on 10 September 2013 for a fee of £50,000 and signing a four-year contract. St. Helens reached the 2014 Super League Grand Final, and Amor was selected to play as a starting prop forward in their 14–6 victory over Wigan at Old Trafford.

In 2016, Amor won the Player of the Year for St Helens at the club's end of season awards and signed a new 3-year contract to keep him at the club until the end of 2020 season.

Amor played in the 2019 Challenge Cup Final defeat by the Warrington Wolves at Wembley Stadium. He played in the 2019 Super League Grand Final victory over the Salford Red Devils at Old Trafford.

In 2020, Amor signed a new one-year deal with St Helens for the 2021 season. Amor played in St Helens 8-4 2020 Super League Grand Final victory over Wigan at the Kingston Communications Stadium in Hull.

On 17 July 2021, Amor played in the 26-12 2021 Challenge Cup Final victory at Wembley Stadium over the Castleford Tigers scoring the final try of the game to end St Helens 13 year Challenge Cup drought. In round 17 of the 2021 Super League season, Amor played his 200th game for St Helens and scored a try during the club's 42–10 victory over Hull F.C.

On 9 October 2021, Amor was named on the interchange bench for St. Helens in their 2021 Super League Grand Final against Catalans Dragons but spent the entire match on the sideline having played no minutes, collecting his fourth Grand Final ring. St. Helens would win the match 12-10 and claim their third straight premiership.

==== Warrington (loan) ====
On 24 May 2022, Amor signed a loan deal to join Warrington for the remainder of the 2022 Super League season.

==== Widnes Vikings ====
On 10 July 2022, it was reported he had signed a part-time deal to join Widnes Vikings for the 2023 season. He announced his retirement midway through the 2023 season.

=== International career ===
==== Ireland ====
In 2011, he made his International début for Ireland against Scotland in the Autumn International Series.

In 2017, he represented Ireland in the Rugby League World Cup playing in Australia & Papua New Guinea. Amor scored a try in Ireland's winning opening match against Italy.

==== Cumbria ====
On 5 Oct 2022, he captained Cumbria for the second time in a World Cup warm-up game against Jamaica.

=== Coaching ===
==== Whitehaven RLFC ====
On 3 Oct 2024, Whitehaven RLFC announced that Anthony Murray would take over from interim head-coach Kyle Amor for the 2025 season on a 3-year deal.
