= Eppie Gibson =

English rugby league player (1927–2018)

- Gibson, c. 1954

Personal information
- Full name: Edward Gibson
- Born: 27 November 1927; Northumberland, England
- Died: 18 January 2018 (aged 90); Workington, Cumbria, England

Playing information
- Position: Centre, Stand-off
Club
Years	Team	Pld	T	G	FG	P
1947–57	Workington Town	335	145	17	2	473
1957–61	Whitehaven	88	20	15		90
	Total	423	165	32	2	563
Representative
Years	Team	Pld	T	G	FG	P
1947–57	Cumberland	17	3	0	0	9
1947–53	England	4	2	0	0	6

Coaching information
Club
Years	Team	Gms	W	D	L	W%
1957–62	Whitehaven
1971–73	Workington Town
	Total	0	0	0	0

Edward "Eppie" Gibson (27 November 1927 – 18 January 2018), was an English rugby league player who played in the 1940s, 1950s and 1960s. He played at representative level for England and Cumberland, and at club level for Workington Town, as a centre, or stand-off, and was player-coach (later coach only) for Whitehaven.

== Background ==
Gibson was born on 27 November 1927, in Northumberland. The son of professional soccer player Ted Gibson, he was raised in Ellenborough. After attending Cockermouth Grammar School, Gibson went to Loughborough Teacher Training College where captained the rugby union team. He won a cap for Cumberland and Westmorland, and also played for the English Universities team. Between 1947 and 1949, he was a national serviceman in the 1st Battalion East Lancashire Regiment.

== Playing career ==
Despite being in the army for the first two years of his career Gibson signed for Workington Town in June 1947, aged 19. Playing at stand-off he made an immediate impact and before the end of the season he had been selected for the first of an eventual 17 caps for Cumberland, and was selected to play for England, making his international début in a 20–15 victory against France at Fartown, Huddersfield. Two more caps followed in 1951 in England's 35–10 defeat by the Other Nationalities at Central Park, Wigan; and in a 35–11 victory over Wales at Knowsley Road, St Helens.

Eppie Gibson played stand-off in Cumberland's 5–4 victory over Australia in the 1948–49 Kangaroo tour of Great Britain and France match at the Recreation Ground, Whitehaven on Wednesday 13 October 1948, in front of a crowd of 8,818.

Workington won their first (and to date only) Championship in 1950–51; Gibson scored two tries in the Championship Final in the 26–11 victory over Warrington at Maine Road. The following season Gibson played at centre as Workington won the Challenge Cup in 1952 (the first time in the club's history) as they beat Featherstone Rovers 18–10 at Wembley Stadium, London on Saturday 19 April 1952, in front of a crowd of 72,093.

A fourth and final England cap came in 1953 in a 30–22 victory against the Other Nationalities at Central Park, Wigan.

In 1955, Workington played in another Challenge Cup final with Gibson at centre and although he scored a try, Workington lost 21–12 to Barrow at Wembley on 30 April before a crowd of 66,513.

At the end of the 1956–57 season during which he had been granted a testimonial Gibson left Workington to become player-coach at nearby rival Whitehaven. During his 10 years at Workington he appeared for the club 335 times, scoring 145 tries and kicking 19 goals.

Gibson succeeded Neville Emery as coach at Whitehaven and continued to play until the end of the 1960–61 season during which he played 88 times and scored 20 tries as well as coaching the team to the quarter-finals of the 1959–60 Challenge Cup, and to sixth place in the league in 1959–60, Whitehaven's highest ever finish in the league. His last match was against Workington on 3 April 1961 after which he retired from playing. The 1961–62 season did not go well for Whitehaven and Gibson stepped down as coach in 1962 to be replaced by Jim Brough.

In 1971, Gibson returned to Workington as coach for two seasons.

== Personal life ==
After leaving the army in 1949 Gibson became a secondary school teacher in the Whitehaven area where he met his wife, Marie. While teaching he was a founder of the English Schools Rugby League, and coached the first English schools team which played France in 1967. He was a member of the board of directors of Whitehaven R.L.F.C in the 1980s, and was named as one of the club's "Immortals" in 1998.

Gibson died on 18 January 2018, aged 90, in Workington.

Sporting positions
Preceded by	Coach Workington Town; 1971–1973	Succeeded by Paul Charlton; 1975-19??
Preceded by Neville Emery; 1951–1956	Coach Whitehaven RLFC; 1956–1962	Succeeded by Jim Brough; 1962-196?
