= Vince Gribbin =

GB international rugby league footballer

Personal information
- Full name: Vincent Gribbin
- Born: 15 March 1965 (age 60) Whitehaven, England

Playing information
- Position: Centre
Club
Years	Team	Pld	T	G	FG	P
1983–85	Whitehaven
1985–≥86	Salford
≤1989–96	Whitehaven
	Total	0	0	0	0	0
Representative
Years	Team	Pld	T	G	FG	P
1985	Great Britain	1	1	0	0	4
1991	Cumbria	1	0	0	0	0

Vincent "Vince" Gribbin (born 15 March 1965) is a former professional rugby league footballer who played in the 1980s and 1990s. He played at representative level for Great Britain, and at club level for Whitehaven (two spells), and Salford, as a centre.

== Background ==
Vince Gribbin's birth was registered in Whitehaven, Cumberland, England.

== Playing career ==
=== Club career ===
Gribbin signed for Whitehaven in July 1982 from junior club Hensingham. He made his debut in October 1982 against Hunslet, scoring two tries and five goals in a 25–16 win at Elland Road, Leeds.

In 1985, Gribbin spent time on loan at Salford, scoring three tries in four appearances before returning to Whitehaven.

Gribbin held Whitehaven's "tries in a season" record with 31 tries, beating Bill Smith's previous record of 29 (this total has since been surpassed by Mick Pechey, who scored 34 in the 1994–95 season). He also holds the club record for most tries in a single match, scoring six against Doncaster on 18 November 1984, a feat equalled by Andrew Bulman in 2019.

Vince Gribbin is a Whitehaven Hall Of Fame Inductee.

=== International honours ===
Vince Gribbin won a cap for Great Britain while at Whitehaven in 1985 against France. He is the last Whitehaven player to represent England or Great Britain at senior international level.
