= Alan McCurrie =

English rugby league footballer

Personal information
- Full name: Alan McCurrie
- Born: 2 December 1953 (age 72) Whitehaven district, England

Playing information
- Position: Hooker
Club
Years	Team	Pld	T	G	FG	P
≤1978–78	Whitehaven
1978–81	Wakefield Trinity	115	8	0	2	26
1981–85	Oldham	120	21	0	4	77
1985–86	Halifax	1	0	0	0	0
1986–87	Whitehaven	31	2	0	0	8
	Total	267	31	0	6	111
Representative
Years	Team	Pld	T	G	FG	P
1977–82	Cumbria	12	2	0	0	6
- Relatives: Steve McCurrie (son)

Alan McCurrie (born 2 December 1953) is an English former professional rugby league footballer who played in the 1970s and 1980s. He played at representative level for Cumbria, and at club level for Hensingham in Whitehaven), Whitehaven (two spells), Wakefield Trinity, Oldham and Halifax, as a hooker.

== Background ==
McCurrie's birth was registered in Whitehaven district, Cumberland, England.

== Playing career ==
=== County honours ===
McCurrie represented Cumbria while at Whitehaven in 1977, and at Wakefield Trinity between 1978 and 1982.

=== Challenge Cup Final appearances ===
McCurrie played hooker in Wakefield Trinity's 3-12 defeat by Widnes in the 1979 Challenge Cup Final during the 1978–79 season at Wembley Stadium, London on Saturday 5 May 1979, in front of a crowd of a crowd of 94,218.

=== Club career ===
McCurrie made his début for Wakefield Trinity against Batley in the John Player Trophy on Sunday 24 September 1978.

== Personal life ==
McCurrie is the father of the rugby league footballer; Steve McCurrie.
