= Jamie Doran (rugby league) =

English rugby league footballer

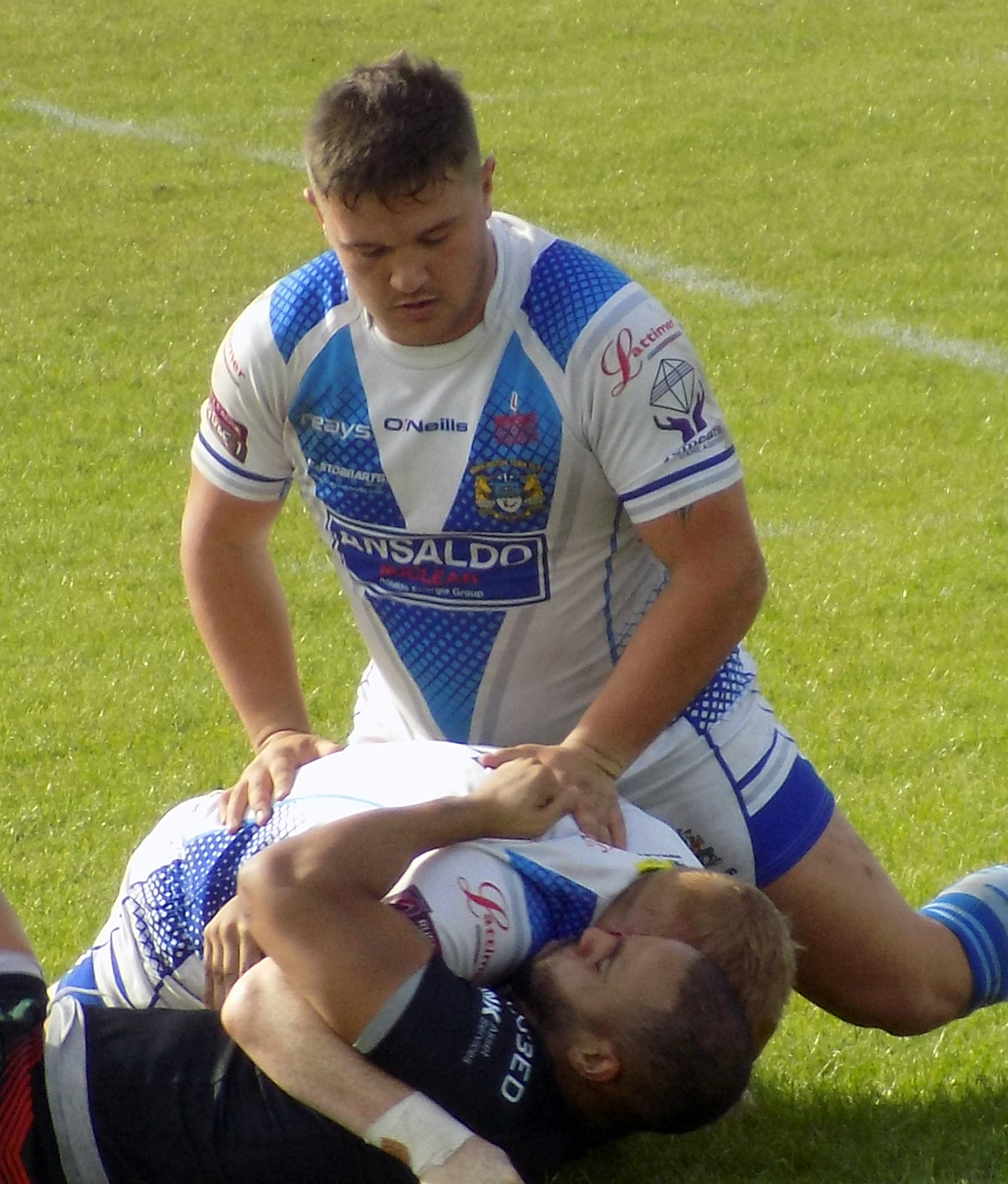

Personal information
- Full name: James Doran
- Born: 8 December 1994 (age 31) Whitehaven, Cumbria, England
- Weight: 15 st 8 lb (99 kg)

Playing information
- Position: Scrum-half, Hooker
Club
Years	Team	Pld	T	G	FG	P
2014–15	Wigan Warriors	2	0	0	0	0
2015(loan)	→ Workington Town	27	3	0	2	14
2016–22	Workington Town	106	36	9	2	164
2023–24	Whitehaven	41	1	0	1	5
2025–	Workington Town	10	4	0	0	16
	Total	186	44	9	5	199
Representative
Years	Team	Pld	T	G	FG	P
2022–	Cumbria	1	0	0	0	0
- Source: As of 10 June 2025

Jamie Doran (born 8 December 1994) is an English professional rugby league footballer who plays as a scrum-half or hooker for Workington Town in the RFL Championship.

== Career ==
=== Wigan Warriors ===
Whitehaven born Doran made his professional début for Super League club Wigan on 27 June 2014 against local rivals St. Helens.

=== Workington Town ===
During 2015, Doran was loaned to Workington Town of the Championship and played 27 times for the club before making the move permanent on 11 September 2015, signing a two-year deal. He played a further two games for the club that season bringing his total for the season up to 29. During the season, Doran scored three tries and also contributed with 2 drop goals.

In 2017, Doran capped a strong (League 1) season by being voted player of the year 2017. In 2018, he played a key role in Workington Town securing a playoff spot at the conclusion of the 2018 season. The hard grafting and tough scrum-half, ever present in both attack and defense.

=== Whitehaven ===
After eight years of notable service to Workington Town their captain Jamie Doran signed for his home-town club Whitehaven after nearly a decade in the professional ranks.

=== Workington Town (re-join) ===
Doran returned to Workington Town ahead of the 2025 season.
