= Frank Foster (rugby league) =

GB international rugby league footballer and coach (1940–2019)

Personal information
- Full name: Frank Foster
- Born: 1939 or 1940 Maryport, Cumbria, England
- Died: 20 December 2019 (aged 79)

Playing information
- Position: Loose forward
Club
Years	Team	Pld	T	G	FG	P
1960–64	Workington Town	111
1964–69	Hull Kingston Rovers	135	7	7	0	35
1968–69	Bradford Northern	35
1969–71	Barrow	53
1971–73	Oldham	47	2	25	0	56
	Total	381	9	32	0	91
Representative
Years	Team	Pld	T	G	FG	P
1959–73	Cumberland	8
1967	Great Britain	1	0	0	0	0

Coaching information
Club
Years	Team	Gms	W	D	L	W%
1973–83	Barrow	349
1983–85	Whitehaven
	Total	349	0	0	0	0

Frank Foster (25 April 1940 – 20 December 2019) born in Maryport was an English professional rugby league footballer who played in the 1960s and 1970s, and coached in the 1970s and 1980s. He played at representative level for Great Britain and Cumberland, and at club level for Workington Town, Hull Kingston Rovers, Bradford Northern, Barrow and Oldham, as a loose forward and coached at club level for Barrow and Whitehaven.

== Playing career ==
=== Workington Town ===
Foster started his professional career with Workington Town, who signed him in 1958. He played for the club until 1965, when he was signed by Hull Kingston Rovers for a fee of £6,500.

=== Hull Kingston Rovers ===
Frank Foster played at second-row in Hull Kingston Rovers' 25–12 victory over Featherstone Rovers in the 1966 Yorkshire Cup Final at Headingley, Leeds on Saturday 15 October 1966, and played as an interchange replacing John Hickson) in the 8–7 victory over Hull F.C. in the 1967 Yorkshire Cup Final at Headingley on Saturday 14 October 1967.

=== Later career ===
In 1968, Foster was sold to Bradford Northern for a fee of £5,000, with Geoff Wriglesworth and Terry Clawson transferring from Bradford to Hull KR as part of the deal. A year later, Foster was signed by Barrow for a transfer fee of £6,000. He finished his playing career with Oldham.

=== Representative honours ===
Frank Foster won a cap for Great Britain while at Hull Kingston Rovers in 1967, against Australia.

Frank Foster represented Cumberland on 8 occasions.

== Coaching career ==
1973 saw Barrow appoint their former player, Foster as coach. He built a side which won the Second Division championship in 1975/76, and reached a John Player Trophy Final in 1981, only to lose 5–12 to Warrington. Phil Hogan was transferred to Hull Kingston Rovers in 1978 for a then world record fee of £33,000. Barrow fluctuated between divisions and Foster was eventually replaced by Tommy Dawes in April 1983. The same year Foster was appointed coach at Whitehaven where he remained in charge until the summer of 1985.
