= Sol Roper =

English rugby league footballer and coach

Personal information
- Full name: John Roper
- Born: third ¼ 1936; Whitehaven district, England
- Died: 14 October 2015 (aged 79)

Playing information
- Position: Scrum-half
Club
Years	Team	Pld	T	G	FG	P
≤1955–66	Workington Town	397+2	94	1		284
	Broughton Moor
	Whitehaven	82
	Total	481	94	1	0	284
Representative
Years	Team	Pld	T	G	FG	P
≤1958–≥58	Cumberland	21

Coaching information
Club
Years	Team	Gms	W	D	L	W%
≤1970–71	Whitehaven
1978–80	Workington Town
	Total	0	0	0	0

John Roper (birth registered in the third quarter of 1936 – 14 October 2015), also known by the nickname of "Sol", was an English professional rugby league footballer who played in the 1950s and 1960s, and coached in the 1960s and 1970s.

== Rugby League clubs ==
- Captained Hensingham A.R.L.F.C. (in Hensingham Whitehaven),
- Workington Town,
- Broughton Moor A.R.L.F.C. (in Broughton Moor),
- Whitehaven R.L.F.C., as a scrum-half. After he stopped playing rugby league he coached at the club.

== Playing career ==
=== County honours ===
Sol Roper at representative level for the Cumberland rugby league team, whilst at Workington Town.

=== Challenge Cup Final appearances ===
Sol Roper played scrum-half, sustained a shoulder injury but returned to the field, in Workington Town's 12–21 defeat by Barrow in the 1954–55 Challenge Cup Final at Wembley Stadium, London on Saturday 30 April 1955 in front of a crowd of 66,513, and was, at the age of 21 years, the youngest Wembley captain in Workington Town's 9–13 defeat by Wigan in the 1957–58 Challenge Cup Final at Wembley Stadium, on Saturday 10 May 1958.

== Genealogical information ==
Sol Roper was the father of the rugby league footballer Tony Roper , and the grandfather of the rugby league footballer Jon Roper.
