= Paul Crarey =

English rugby league coach and former semi-professional rugby league footballer

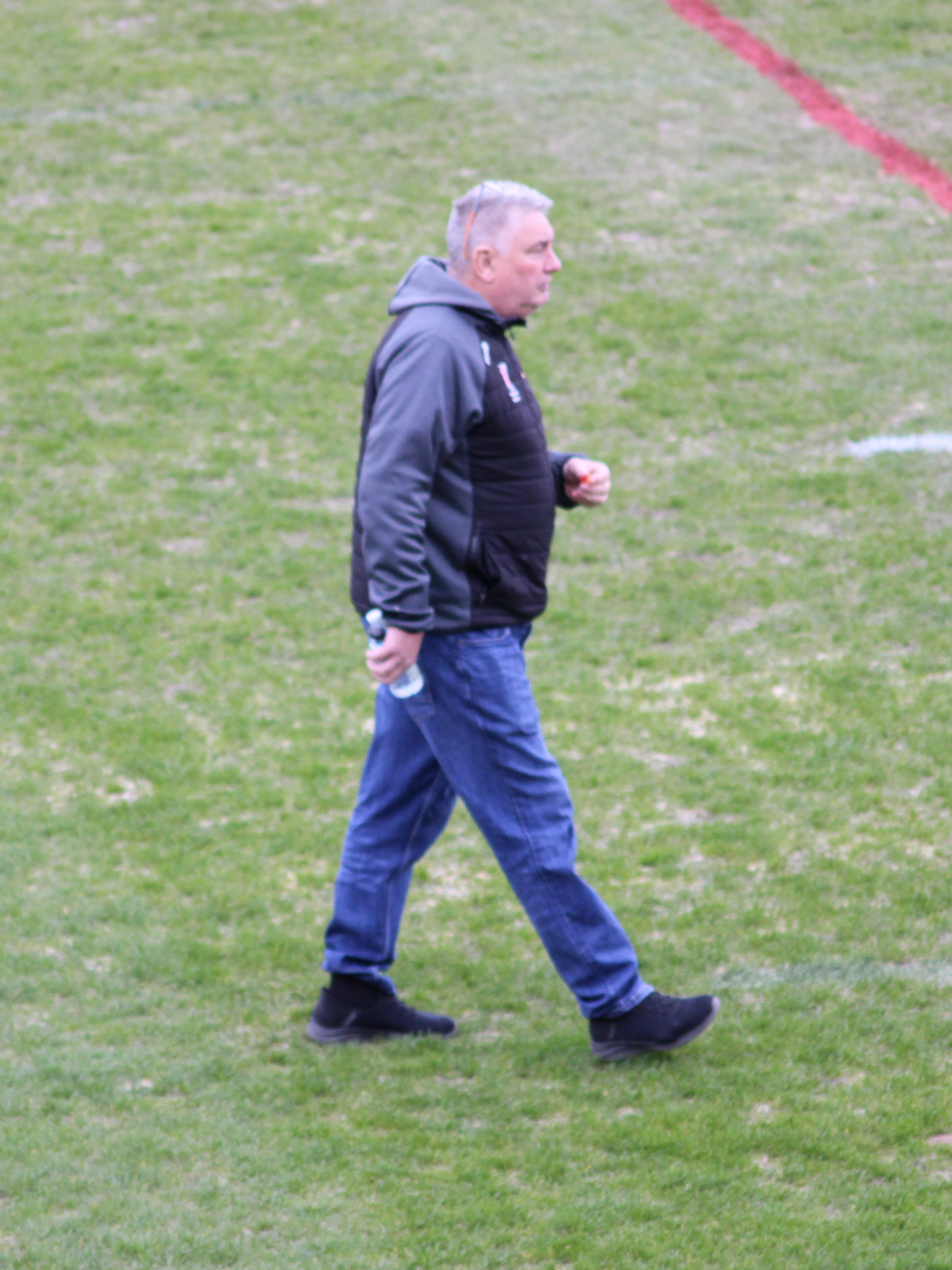

Personal information
- Full name: Paul Crarey
- Born: 4 January 1966 (age 60) Barrow-in-Furness, Cumbria, England

Playing information
- Position: Hooker
Club
Years	Team	Pld	T	G	FG	P
1987–92	Barrow	167	16	0	0	64
1992–93	Whitehaven	10	2	0	0	8
1993	Carlisle	15	5	0	0	20
1994	Barrow	15	2	0	0	8
	Total	207	25	0	0	100
Representative
Years	Team	Pld	T	G	FG	P
1992	Cumbria	1	0	0	0	0

Coaching information
Club
Years	Team	Gms	W	D	L	W%
2005–07	Barrow	0	0	0	0
2007–08	Whitehaven	0	0	0	0
2014–	Barrow Raiders	204	97	6	101	48
	Total	204	97	6	101	48
Representative
Years	Team	Gms	W	D	L	W%
2010–	Cumbria	1	1	0	0	100
- Source: As of 3 November 2026

Paul Crarey (born 4 January 1966) also known by the nickname of "Cresta" is an English rugby league coach who is the head coach of semi-professional side Barrow Raiders in the Betfred Championship.

He is also a former semi-professional rugby league footballer who played in the 1980s and 1990s, and coached in the 1990s, 2000s and 2010s. He played at amateur level for Dalton ARLFC , Barrow (1987-1995, 172 appearances, 20+ tries), and Carlisle, as a hooker and coached at representative level for Cumbria and BARLA Great Britain Lions, and back at the semi-professional level for Barrow (2005–07, 2014–present), and Whitehaven (?-2008).

Despite a lengthy career in rugby league, Crarey has never coached or played at the professional level. He won a Shooting Star award in 1988.

== Coaching career ==
After retiring as a player, Crarey moved into coaching. He had coaching spells at amateur clubs Dalton and Walney Central before being appointed as head coach at semi-pro side Barrow Raiders in October 2005.

Crarey departed Barrow at the end of the 2007 season and became head coach at Whitehaven, but was forced to step down in March 2008 for health reasons.

He subsequently returned to coaching at amateur level for a few years before re-joining Barrow for a second spell at the semi-pro level in 2014.
