= Martin Oglanby =

English RL coach and former rugby league footballer

Personal information
- Full name: Martin Oglanby
- Born: 22 July 1964 (age 62) Cumbria, England

Playing information
- Position: Second-row, Centre
Club
Years	Team	Pld	T	G	FG	P
1990–95	Workington Town	107	18	0	0	72
Representative
Years	Team	Pld	T	G	FG	P
	BARLA

Coaching information
Club
Years	Team	Gms	W	D	L	W%
2009–13	Workington Town	116	55	2	59	47

Martin Oglanby is a former rugby league footballer and coach. He was the joint head coach with Gary Charlton of Co-operative Championship 1 side Workington Town between 2009 and 2013.

== Backgrpound ==
Martin Oglanby was born in Cumbria, England.

== Playing career ==
As a professional rugby league footballer he played Workington Town between 1990 and 1995 in the Championship, and the Second Division Championship. He played as a centre, or second-row.

Oglanby played in the Premiership Finals for Workington at Old Trafford in 1993 and in 1994, tasting victory in the latter as Town beat London Crusaders 30-22, as Town thrived under the coaching of Peter Walsh. Oglanby had already been named the division's player of the year at the sport's Man of Steel presentation, as he helped Town win the division and gain promotion to the Big League.

Shortly into Town's successful division one campaign of 1994-95, Oglanby suffered a shoulder injury that forced him to retire, but he still provided one of the highlights of the season for the club in scoring a wonderful try in the opening match of the season, as Town came within a whisker of beating the much-fancied Leeds, losing 16-22 to a couple of late tries. Playing in the unusual position of stand-off, Oglanby was more than a match for the Great Britain international Garry Schofield.

He was a noted amateur player and received representative honours as a BARLA Great Britain international.

He has coached at Aspatria, Glasson and Maryport, and at national level he was the assistant coach of the Great Britain Under-21 team in 2008 and was the assistant coach of the GB Under-23 side that played against Ukraine.

Oglandby and Gary Charlton replaced Dave Rotherham to become joint head coaches of Workington Town in July 2009. The duo led the club to the Grand Final of 2011, where they lost to Keighley Cougars.
