= Anthony Murray (rugby league, born 1977) =

English rugby league coach and former rugby league footballer

Personal information
- Born: 27 May 1977 (age 49) Leigh, Greater Manchester, England

Playing information
- Position: Hooker
Club
Years	Team	Pld	T	G	FG	P
1997	Warrington Wolves	1	0	0	0	0
1997	Widnes Vikings	8	0	0	0	0
1998–00	Leigh Centurions	74	36	1	0	146
2000	Rochdale Hornets	6	2	0	0	8
2001	Barrow Raiders	30	11	0	0	44
2002	Swinton Lions	3	0	0	0	0
2002–03	Oldham	10	1	0	0	4
2002(loan)	→ Chorley Lynx	2	0	0	0	0
2003	Workington Town	15	2	0	0	8
2004	Chorley Lynx	14	1	0	0	4
	Total	163	53	1	0	214

Coaching information
Club
Years	Team	Gms	W	D	L	W%
2013–14	Barrow Raiders	4	1	0	3	25
2014–16	North Wales Crusaders	58	27	3	28	47
2016–18	Gloucestershire All Golds
2018–22	North Wales Crusaders
2023–24	Workington Town	43	20	0	23	47
2025–26	Whitehaven	28	10	1	17	36
2026–	Swinton Lions	15	5	1	9	33
	Total	148	63	5	80	43
- Source: As of 3 November 2026

Anthony Murray (born 27 May 1977) is an English professional rugby league coach who is the head coach of the Swinton Lions in the RFL Championship and a former professional rugby league footballer who played in the 1990s and 2000s.

He played at club level for the Warrington Wolves, making one appearance in 1997's Super League II, Widnes Vikings, Leigh Centurions, Oldham, Barrow Raiders and Lancashire Lynx, as a hooker, and has coached at club level initially at amateur level, then Barrow Raiders, North Wales Crusaders, Gloucestershire All Golds, and Workington Town, and was previously the head coach at Whitehaven RLFC.

== Coaching career ==
=== Barrow Raiders ===
Murray was appointed as head coach at Barrow Raiders at the end of the 2013 season, but resigned from the position after four games in the 2014 season due to work commitments.

=== North Wales Crusaders ===
In June 2014, he became head coach at North Wales Crusaders.

=== Workington Town ===
In September 2022, he was announced as the head-coach of Workington Town, following the departure of Chris Thorman.

=== Whitehaven RLFC ===
On 3 Oct 2024, Whitehaven RLFC announced that he would take over from interim head-coach Kyle Amor for the 2025 season, on a 3-year deal.

On 2 March 2026 he announced his resignation, with immediate effect due to work commitments, as head-coach

=== Swinton Lions ===
On 30 March 2026 it was reported that he had taken the role of head-coach for Swinton Lions in the RFL Championship following the resignation of Paul Wood
