= Steve Burney =

British rugby league player

Playing information
- Position: Second-row
Club
Years	Team	Pld	T	G	FG	P
	Whitehaven

Steve Burney is a former professional rugby league footballer who played in the 1980s. He played at club level for Whitehaven (two spells), and lower grades for Western Suburbs Magpies, as a second-row.
