= BARLA Cumbria Cup =

Rugby league in Cumbria, England

The BARLA Cumbria Cup is an amateur rugby league knock-out competition for clubs in the county of Cumbria. The cup is administered by the Cumberland Amateur Rugby League Association, a branch of the British Amateur Rugby League Association, and has been played for since 1982.

The final was traditionally played around Christmas time every year. The cup's most successful club is Kells, who have won the final ten times.

== Past winners ==
Final	Winner	Score	Runners-up
1982–83	Kells	15–11	Hensingham
1983–84	Kells	14–13	Wath Brow Hornets
1984–85	Glasson Rangers	14–10	Ulverston
1985–86	Kells	34–12	Lowca
1986–87	Kells	20–12	Egremont Rangers
1987–88	Kells	36–7	Wath Brow Hornets
1988–89	Barrow Island	16–10	Kells
1989–90	Millom	9–8	Kells
1990–91	Hensingham	7–0	Millom
1991–92	Kells	14–8	Ellenborough Rangers
1992–93	Kells	2–0	Hensingham
1993–94	Hensingham	11–4	Kells
1994–95	Walney Central	18–16	Hensingham
1995–96	Ellenborough Rangers	26–0	Barrow Island
1996–97	Ellenborough Rangers	44–16	Westfield
1997–98	Ellenborough Rangers	28–14	Broughton Red Rose
1998–99	Wath Brow Hornets	16–10	Ellenborough Rangers
1999–00	Wath Brow Hornets	32–12	Hensingham
2000–01	Wath Brow Hornets	32–6	Egremont Rangers
2001–02	Wath Brow Hornets	46–6	Kells
2002–03	Hensingham	8–6	Kells
2003–04	Seaton Rangers	34–2	Barrow Island
2004–05	Ellenborough Rangers	16–10	Egremont Rangers
2005–06	Barrow Island	18–6	Seaton Rangers
2006–07	Broughton Red Rose	18–8	Ellenborough Rangers
2007–08	Ellenborough Rangers	31–28	Kells
2008–09	Ellenborough Rangers	19–8	Kells
2009–10	Kells	18–16	Seaton Rangers
2010–11	Seaton Rangers	22–16	Distington
2011–12	Kells	24–4	Walney Central
2012–13	Kells	42–4	Glasson Rangers
2013	Maryport	20–14	Walney Central
2014	Maryport	42–12	Walney Central
2015	Seaton Rangers	42–10	Walney Central
2016	Distington	23–6	Barrow Island
2017	Hensingham	22–20	Walney Central

== Final Record by Club ==
Team	Winners	Runners-up	Years won	Years runner-up
Kells	7	7	1982/83, 1983/84, 1985/86, 1986/87, 1987/88, 1991/92, 1992/93	1988/89, 1989/90, 1993/94, 2001/02, 2002/03, 2007/08, 2008/09
Ellenborough Rangers	6	3	1995/96, 1996/97, 1997/98, 2004/05, 2007/08, 2008/09	1991/92, 1998/99, 2006/07
Wath Brow Hornets	4	2	1998/99, 1999/00, 2000/01, 2001/02	1983/84, 1987/88
Hensingham	3	4	1990/91, 1993/94, 2002/03	1982/83, 1992/93, 1994/95, 1999/00
Barrow Island	2	2	1988/89, 2005/06	1995/96, 2003/04
Broughton Red Rose	1	1	2006/07	1997/98
Millom	1	1	1989/90	1990/91
Seaton Rangers	1	1	2003/04	2005/06
Walney Central	1	-	1994/95	-
Glasson Rangers	1	-	1984/85	-
Egremont Rangers	-	3	-	1986/87, 2000/01, 2004/05
Lowca	-	1	-	1985/86
Ulverston	-	1	-	1984/85
Westfield	-	1	-	1996/97

== See also ==
- British Amateur Rugby League Association
- Cumberland League
- BARLA National Cup
