= Kells A.R.L.F.C. =

English amateur rugby league club

Kells

Club information
- Full name: Kells; Amateur Rugby League Football Club
- Colours: Red; White; Black Trim
- Founded: 1931; 95 years ago

Current details
- Ground: Old Arrowthwaite, Kells, Whitehaven
- Coach: Peter Smith
- Competition: NCRL National League One

Uniforms
Home colours

Kells A.R.L.F.C. is an amateur rugby league football club based in Kells, Whitehaven. The club's first team plays in the National Community Rugby League.

Kells Amateur Rugby League Football Club was first formed in 1931. The club played in the Cumberland League and held winning titles for a number of years. Kells left the Cumberland League in 2012 to start life in division 3 of the national conference and won division 3 and division 2 at the first attempt.

The current Kells Amateur Rugby League Club can trace its origins back to 1931.

== History ==
In 2016, Kells defeated Hemel Stags of League One to reach the forth round of the Challenge Cup. They reached the forth round again in 2018.

== Notable players ==
- Gregg McNally
- Edward Bowman
- Arnold Walker
- Paul Charlton
- Jordan Johnstone

== Honours ==
- National Conference League Division One
  - Winners (1): 2015
- National Conference League Division Two
  - Winners (1): 2014
- National Conference League Division Three
  - Winners (1): 2013
- BARLA Cumbria Cup
  - Winners (10): 1982–83, 1983–84, 1985–86, 1986–87, 1987–88, 1991–92, 1992–93, 2009–10, 2011–12, 2012–13
  - Cumberland League 1934–35, 1981–82, 1989–90, 2008–09, 2012–13
