= Whitehaven R.L.F.C. =

English professional rugby league club

Whitehaven RLFC

Club information
- Full name: Whitehaven Rugby League Football Club
- Nickname(s): Haven; Marras
- Colours: Chocolate, blue and gold
- Founded: 1948; 78 years ago (formation); 2010; 16 years ago (reformation)
- Website: whitehavenrl.co.uk

Current details
- Ground: Ortus REC (7,500)
- Chairman: Lee Butterworth
- Coach: James Newton
- Captain: tbc
- Competition: Championship
- 2026 season: 9th (Eliminators)
- Current season

Uniforms
Home colours	Away colours

Records
- Championship: 0
- League 1: 1 (2019)
- Most capped: 417 – John McKeown
- Highest points scorer: 2,133 – John McKeown

Whitehaven R.L.F.C. is a professional rugby league club, from Whitehaven, Cumbria. They currently play in League One following relegation from the Championship in 2024. They currently play their games at the Recreation Ground (known locally as the Recre).

Their nicknames are 'Haven' or the 'Marras' (a local dialect word for 'mates'). Their mascot is a lion called "Pride". Between 1997 and 2003 they were known as Whitehaven Warriors.

Their local rivals are Workington Town.

== History ==
=== Foundation ===
Rugby league in Cumbria can trace its roots back over 100 years to the formation of the Northern Union. Whitehaven had its own team, Whitehaven Recreation, which competed in the Challenge Cup in the first decade of the 20th century.

Whitehaven RLFC was formed at a meeting held in the Miners' Welfare Club at Kells from the Whitehaven Miners' Welfare team in 1948 and shortly afterwards were admitted into the Rugby Football League by just three votes. Whitehaven took over the Miners' Welfare lease at the Recreation Ground. In their first game Haven beat Hull F.C. 5–0. There was a "disappointing" turnout of only 9,000 because of the pouring rain; in those days the supporters' club had 4,000 members. The early Whitehaven team were nicknamed "the Colliers" because of the Miners' Welfare connection.

In a Britain that still was still recovering from wartime rationing and austerity Whitehaven gradually picked itself up. Billy Little came to the Recreation Ground in 1950 as coach at a time when the fledgling Haven club were struggling to compete in the professional league. His tenure as coach signalled an era of progress and improvement. In 1951, the first of a long line of players from Australasia joined Haven as Neville Emery became player-coach. Whitehaven finished tenth in a league of 30 in the 1952–53 season and Whitehaven team lost 15-5 to the touring Australians watched by a crowd of 9,253 at the Recreation Ground.

On Saturday 20 October 1956, Whitehaven defeated the Australian tourists 14–11 before a crowd of 10,917 at the Recreation Ground. Later that season the club came within minutes of a Wembley appearance when they lost 10–9 to Leeds in a Challenge Cup semi-final before a 50,000 crowd at the Odsal Stadium, featuring players such as the legendary Dick Huddart and full back John McKeown. The end of that season saw Emery return home to be replaced by Edward Gibson, who rebuilt the team, and in 1959/60 the club finished 6th in the league their highest ever position.

=== 1960s and onwards ===
The club's record attendance was set in 1960 when 18,650 spectators turned up for a third round Challenge Cup game against Wakefield Trinity. Despite this, the 1960s were a period of decline as the club struggled on the field, though in 1965 the club defeated the touring New Zealanders 12–5, the winning try scored by John Coupe. It wasn't until 1970 that the club emerged from this lean spell. Under the coaching of Sol Roper they topped the league table for part of the 1969–70 season. Once again the club defeated the game's top clubs like St. Helens, Wigan and Bradford Northern at the Recreation Ground.

Jeff Bawden in 1971–72, his first season as head coach, was able to take Whitehaven to Central Park and beat Wigan on their own patch for the first time in Whitehaven's history. The club progressed over the next few years and in 1973 acquired floodlights. However success was once again denied at the last hurdle as the club suffered semi-final defeats in both the Lancashire County Cup and the John Player Cup.

Phil Kitchin became coach in 1980. Two promotions to the top division came in the 1980s, and during this period the club produced a batch of internationals in scrum half Arnold 'Boxer' Walker, forward Vince Fox and centre Vince Gribbin. Kitchen was sacked in 1981 and Arnold Walker became player-coach before also being sacked as coach.

By the end of the 1980s the club found itself back in Division Two.

Whitehaven faced a financial crisis in 1992. Eleven local businessmen, Copeland Council and Albright & Wilson joined forces to form Whitehaven 1992 Ltd, the holding company which owns 70 per cent of the shares.

=== Summer era ===
When Super League was proposed Whitehaven were supposed to merge with Barrow, Carlisle and Workington Town to form a Cumbria club to be based at Workington, that would take part in the new summer competition. This was successfully resisted.

Whitehaven Warriors ended 1996 one place above the relegation positions. The appointment of Kiwi coaches Kurt Sorensen and Stan Martin brought about a revival at the club with Haven finishing third in Division One in 1997 and reaching the play-off semi-finals only to lose to Hull F.C. The club adopted the name Whitehaven Warriors during that season.

Martin quit as coach in summer 1998, Colin Armstrong took temporary charge of Whitehaven before Edgar took over.

The merger issue resurfaced in 2000, Whitehaven were so heavily in debt that a merger with Workington seemed the only means of survival. However, the board of directors rejected a merger proposal with Workington Town and then resigned en masse.

Paul Cullen arrived as coach in September 2000 taking over from Kevin Tamati. This heralded upward progression for Whitehaven. The club made steady progress and earned a place in National League 1 for 2003. Cullen left in August 2002 to manage Warrington. Peter Smith took over as coach with help from Peter Roe before Steve McCormack was appointed in 2004. Whitehaven dropped the Warriors epithet and went back to being plain Whitehaven.

In 2004, they were undefeated at home in the league and made it to the semi-final of the Arriva Trains Cup losing to the eventual winners Leigh Centurions. They also narrowly lost out on promotion to Super League after losing 32–16 in extra time to Leigh in the National League One grand final. The following year despite Castleford being red hot favourites for promotion Whitehaven managed to win their first piece of silverware when he took the National League One League Leader's trophy, however they were unable to take this success into the grand final, where they were heavily beaten by Castleford.

Steve McCormack left to manage Widnes and was replaced by Dave Rotheram in November 2005. In 2006, Haven finished 4th and reached the National League 1 play-offs, only to be beaten 24–20 by Steve McCormack's Widnes in a hard fought semi-final. They were knocked out of the Northern Rail Cup at the quarter-final stage by Hull Kingston Rovers who would eventually be promoted to the Engage Super League that season.

In late 2006 they became the first ever winners of the pre-season Ike Southward Trophy, beating neighbours Workington Town 18–6 at the Recreation Ground. Haven made it to the final of the Northern Rail Cup for the first time in 2007 but lost 54–6 to Widnes.

Whitehaven appointed Paul Crarey as their new coach in October 2007 as Dave Rotheram left to manage Workington Town.

In early 2008 Gerard Stokes was offered the job of coaching Haven, after coach Paul Crarey left the club citing personal health issues. Stokes led Haven to the play-offs during his first season in charge. However a disastrous 13-game losing streak saw the club relegated to Championship 1 at the end of the 2010 season.

=== 2010 Reformation ===
Following relegation at the end if the 2010 season, Whiteaven went into administration and re-formed under the name Whitehaven 2010. As a consequence, Haven were deducted nine points for next season's Championship 1.

Club legend David Seeds was appointed head coach and started the season unbeaten, wiping out the nine-point deduction in the first few games but fell short of promotion being knocked out in the play-offs by Doncaster. Following the game David Seeds resigned as coach and Les Ashe resigned as assistant coach.

Towards the end of 2011 Haven appointed Don Gailer from the North Devils in Australia as new head coach, with the remit being promotion to the Championship. Haven finished 4th, thus securing the final promotion berth after Doncaster, Barrow and local rivals Workington Town. Gailer was sacked just two weeks after securing promotion following a rift between the coach and Haven players.

In September 2012 Haven announced that ex Castleford coach Dave Woods would coach the side in 2013, Haven immediately set about strengthening for 2013 signing prop Paul Jackson from Super League side Castleford. Prior to the start of the season Haven announced a dual registration link-up with Super League side St Helens, during the season Ade Gardner, Paul Clough, Tommy Makinson, Carl Forster, Jordan Hand, Joe Greenwood, Anthony Walker and Adam Swift would turn out for the club with Swift in particular impressing from fullback. Haven started well, winning the opening two games before losing at home to Leigh Centurions in front of the Premier Sports cameras. Haven would finally break a 7-game losing streak against local rivals Workington Town winning 29–18 on Sunday 23 June before securing a place in the Championship for the following season.

Steve Deakin was appointed as head coach in September 2014. A mass exodus of players followed; out of a squad of twenty-four, eighteen left and Haven were left with six players Deakin resigned for personal reasons a week before the first game of the season and player Brett Seymour took temporary charge. James Coyle was then appointed as player-coach on a caretaker basis with Brett Seymour.

In 2020, Whitehaven played in the Championship following their promotion from League 1 after winning the title with 32 points from 20 games. In the 2021 Championship season, Whitehaven finished sixth on the table and qualified for the playoffs. In the first week of the playoffs, they were defeated 24-20 by Halifax which ended their season. In the 2022 RFL Championship season, Whitehaven finished 10th on the table. The following season, Whitehaven finished 12th on the table.

==== Crisis (Aug 2024) ====
In August 2024 the club entered crisis as head coach Jonty Gorley resigned with team manager Des Byrne resigning two days later, along with numerous other staff members amid threats of redundancy.; Kyle Amor took over as interim head-coach in an attempt to avert a complete breakdown. Further, all first team players went (and are currently) on strike, due to no payments being made throughout July and August. This occurring after weeks of not fielding a full squad on matchdays. On 21 August, the RFL stepped in to help alleviate the crisis, but threatened severe sanctions if any fixtures could not be fulfilled. A deal was reached to temporarily suspended strike action for the 25 August fixture against Dewsbury. They won the game with a 14 player match day squad. In September, the club received a £12,000 donation from Wakefield Trinity. Despite winning their final game of the season, Whitehaven were relegated having finished 13th. The game also saw club captain, James Newton, break his neck.

== 2027 squad ==
Whitehaven RLFC 2027 Squad
First team squad			Coaching staff
(England) Ross Ainley – PR; (England) Brad Brennan – PR; (England) Lewis Brown – SH; (England) Andrew Bulman – WG; (England) Xenden Callander – CE, WG; (England) Dave Eccleston – WG, CE; (England) Ellison Holgate – HK; (England) Connor Holliday – SR, CE	(England) Jack Kellett – LF, SH; (England) Mason Lethwaite – SR, LF; (England) Ellis Nixon – LF; (England) Ben Pearce – SR, PR, LF; (England) Jackson Smith – PR; (England) Mitchell Todd – CE, WG; (England) Ciaran Walker – SO, SH	(England) Woody Walker – PR; (England) Dom Wear – SH; (England) Jay Weatherill – WG; (England) Liam Williamson – HK	Head coach: James Newton; Assistant coach: Neil Frazer; Legend: (c) Captain(s); (vc) Vice-captain(s); Updated: Source(s): https://www.whitehavenrl.co.uk/squad

== 2027 transfers ==
=== Gains ===
Player	From	Contract	Date
(England) Woody Walker	Castleford Tigers	2 years	21 August 2026
(England) Andrew Bulman	Barrow Raiders	2 years	19 September 2026
(England) Ross Ainley	Workington Town	1 year	9 October 2026
(England) Mason Lewthwaite	Workington Town	2 years	3 November 2026
(England) Dom Wear	Workington Town	2 years	20 November 2026

=== Losses ===
Player	To	Contract	Date
(England) Jake Pearce			19 November 2026

=== Retired ===
Player	Date
(England) Marc Shackley	11 August 2026
(England) Jordan Burns	14 September 2026

== Players ==
=== Players earning international caps while at Whitehaven ===
- Richard Fletcher won caps for Scotland while at Hull, Castleford and Whitehaven 2001...2007 5-caps + 1-cap (sub)
- "Vince" Gribbin won a cap for Great Britain while at Whitehaven in 1985 1-cap
- Bill Holliday won caps for Great Britain while at Whitehaven in 1964 against France, in 1965 against France, New Zealand (3 matches), while at Hull Kingston Rovers in 1966 against France, France (sub), in 1967 against Australia (3 matches). Bill Holliday captained Great Britain in 1967 against Australia (3 matches).
- Milton Huddart won a cap for England while at Whitehaven in 1984 against Wales
- Dick Huddart won caps for England while at St. Helens in 1962 against France, and won caps for Great Britain while at Whitehaven in 1958 against Australia (2 matches), New Zealand (2 matches), while at St. Helens in 1959 against Australia, in 1961 against New Zealand (3 matches), in 1962 against France (2 matches), Australia (3 matches), New Zealand (2 matches), in 1963 against Australia
- Lee Kiddie won a cap for Scotland while at Whitehaven in 2003
- Phil Kitchin won a cap for Great Britain while at Whitehaven in 1965 against New Zealand
- John J. McKeown won a cap for Great Britain while at Whitehaven in 1955/56 against France (Internationals against France were not granted full Test match status by the RFL until 1957)
- Spencer Miller won caps for Scotland while at Whitehaven in 2003 against Ireland and France, in 2004 against Wales and in 2006 against Wales
- Mick Nanyn won caps for Scotland while at Whitehaven, Widnes and Oldham 2005...present 6-caps + 1-cap (sub)
- Arnold 'Boxer' Walker won a cap for England while at Whitehaven in 1981 against France, and won a cap for Great Britain while at Whitehaven in 1980 against New Zealand
- Matt Jimmy Dalton Great Britain v France Feb 1986

=== Haven immortals (Hall of Fame) ===
1. John McKeown circa-1950s
2. Bill Smith (No. 2) circa-1950s
3. Vince Gribbin
4. Eppie Gibson
5. Syd Lowdon (No. 5) circa-1950s
6. Phil Kitchin circa-1956-65
7. Arnold 'Boxer' Walker
8. Bill McAlone (Testimonial match 1960)
9. Aaron Lester
10. John Tembey circa-1950s
11. Bill Holliday
12. Dick Huddart
13. Gordon Cottier
14. Billy Garratt (No. 3) circa-1950s
15. Geoff Robinson (No. 13)
16. Dave Watson circa-1980s
17. Les Moore (No. 10) circa-1963-65
18. Matt Jimmy Dalton (No. 2)

=== Other notable players ===
- 1940s
- Jeff Bawden
- 1950s
- Billy Banks (No. 7)
- John 'Trackie' McVay circa-1956
- Les Moore (No. 10) circa-1956-65
- Dennis Williamson circa-1956-61 (To Wakefield Trinity)
- 1960s
- Eddie Bowman
- Matt McLeod circa-1965
- Brian Shillinglaw, for Scotland (RU) while at Gala RFC (RU) 1960–61 5-caps (signed for Whitehaven 1961–62 (No. 7))
- 1970s
- Alan McCurrie
- 1980s
- Mark Beckwith circa-1980s
- Steve Burney (No. 11)
- Gary Hetherington (No. 13)
- Matt Jimmy Dalton (No. 2)
- 1990s
- Graeme Morton (Testimonial match 2003)
- 2000s
- Garry Purdham (1999–2004)
- Brett McDermott
- Leroy Joe
- David Fatialofa

== Past coaches ==
Also see Category:Whitehaven R.L.F.C. coaches.

- Jack Kitching 1948
- Billy Little 1950
- Neville Emery 1951–56
- Edward Gibson 1956–62
- Jim Brough 1962–??
- Gus Risman
- Ike Southward 1968
- Sol Roper 1970–71
- Jeff Bawden 1971–?
- Bill Smith 197?–78
- Ray Dutton 1978–79
- Phil Kitchin 1980–81
- Arnold Walker 1981
- Tommy Dawes 1982–83
- Frank Foster 1984–85
- Phil Kitchin 1986–87
- Barry Smith 1988–89
- Gordon Cottier 1993
- Norman Turley 1990–91
- Kurt Sorensen 1994–95
- Stan Martin 1995-99
- Colin Armstrong
- Kevin Tamati 1999–2000
- Paul Cullen 2000–02
- Peter Smith 2002–?
- Steve McCormack 2004–05
- Dave Rotheram 2006
- Paul Crarey ?-2008
- Gerard Stokes 2008–10
- David Seeds 2011
- Don Gailer 2012
- Dave Woods 2013–15
- Steve Deakin 2015
- James Coyle 2015–16
- Carl Forster 2017-18
- Gary Charlton 2018–2021
- Jonty Gorley 2022–24
- Kyle Amor 2024
- Anthony Murray 2025-26
- James Newton (interim) 2026-

== Seasons ==
=== Super League era ===
Season	League									Play-offs	Challenge Cup	Other competitions		Name	Tries	Name	Points
Season	Division	P	W	D	L	F	A	Pts	Pos	Play-offs	Challenge Cup	Other competitions		Top try scorer		Top point scorer	
1996	Division One	20	5	1	14	328	546	11	9th		R4						
1997	Division One	20	11	1	8	436	398	23	4th		R4						
1998	Division One	30	13	0	17	636	657	26	8th		R4						
1999	Northern Ford Premiership	28	16	0	12	651	620	32	8th		QF						
2000	Northern Ford Premiership	28	11	1	16	533	674	23	11th		R4						
2001	Northern Ford Premiership	28	15	1	12	608	419	31	10th		R5						
2002	Northern Ford Premiership	27	15	1	11	647	600	31	8th		R5						
2003	National League One	18	5	5	8	443	438	15	6th	Lost in Elimination Playoffs	R4						
2004	National League One	18	14	0	4	552	312	28	2nd	Lost in Final	QF						
2005	National League One	18	16	0	2	648	307	32	1st	Lost in Final	R4						
2006	National League One	18	12	1	5	516	408	25	4th	Lost in Semi Final	R5						
2007	National League One	18	11	0	7	474	342	38	4th	Lost in Semi Final	R5	Championship Cup	RU				
2008	National League One	18	10	0	8	420	399	32	5th	Lost in Preliminary Final	R5						
2009	Championship	20	12	0	8	565	567	39	5th	Lost in Elimination Playoffs	R3						
2010	Championship	20	4	0	16	281	707	16	10th		R4						
2011	Championship 1	20	13	2	5	566	425	36	6th		R3						
2012	Championship 1	18	12	0	6	549	421	37	4th	Lost in Semi Final	R4						
2013	Championship	26	11	0	15	485	774	37	9th		R4						
2014	Championship	26	13	0	13	592	666	45	9th		R3						
2015	Championship	23	7	0	16	418	671	14	10th		R4						
2015	Championship Shield	30	10	0	20	618	921	20	6th		R4						
2016	Championship	23	5	1	17	367	720	11	12th		R4						
2016	Championship Shield	30	8	1	21	571	945	17	7th		R4						
2017	League 1	22	17	1	4	656	349	35	3rd	Lost in Final	R5						
2018	League 1	26	16	0	10	702	529	32	6th		R6						
2019	League 1	20	15	2	3	582	283	32	1st	N/A (Note: League leaders do not compete in playoffs)	R4	1895 Cup	R1				
2020	Championship (Note: The 2020 Championship was abandoned due to the COVID-19 pandemic in the United Kingdom. Statistics shown are those at time of abandonment and are not official.)	5	0	0	5	54	146	0	14th		R4						
2021	Championship	22	12	1	9	502	524	25	6th	Lost in Elimination Playoffs	R4 (Note: Officially round 2 due to the competitions temporary restructure in 2021.)	1895 Cup	R1				
2022	Championship	27	9	1	17	488	854	19	10th		R6	1895 Cup	PO				
2023	Championship	27	8	0	19	481	809	16	12th		R3						
2024	Championship	26	8	2	16	451	854	18	13th		R3	1895 Cup	GS				
2025	League One	18	7	1	10	384	420	15	8th (Note: Promotion due to the merging League One and the Championship)	Play-offs cancelled	R3	1895 Cup	PR				
2026	Championship	24	11	1	12	519	661	23	9th	Lost in Elimination Semi-finals	R2	1895 Cup	R1				

== Honours ==
- Division 2 / Championship:

Winners (1): 2005

RFL Championship Leaders' Shield
Winners (1): 2005

- Division 3 / League 1:

Winners (1): 2019

- Cumberland County Cup

Winners (2): 1905–06, 1906–07

- Cumberland League

Winners (1): 1905–06

=== U23's ===
- U23's League Leaders (1) : 2010
- U23's Grand Final Winners (1): 2010

- Ike Southward Memorial Trophy:

== Club records ==
=== Team ===
- Highest score: 86–6 vs Highfield 1995
- Heaviest defeat: 106–8 vs Wigan 12 May 2008
- Record attendance: 18,650, vs Wakefield Trinity 1960

=== Individual ===
- Tries in a career: 238 Craig Calvert (2004–2017)
- Tries in a season: 34 Mick Pechey (1994–95)
- Tries in a match: 6 "Vince" Gribbin (vs Doncaster 18 November 1984) & Andrew Bulman (vs Wigan St Patricks 10 March 2019)
- Goals in a career: 1,050 John McKeown (1948–61)
- Goals in a season: 141 John McKeown (1956–57)
- Goals in a match: 13 Lee Anderson (v Highfield 25 January 1995)
- Points in a career: 2,133 John McKeown (1948–61)
- Points in a season: 400 Mick Nanyn (2004)
- Points in a match: 32 Mick Nanyn (vs Batley 22 August 2004) & Greg McNally (vs Featherstone Rovers 22 March 2009)
- Appearances in a career: 417 John McKeown (1948–61)
- Appearances in a season: 42 John McKeown (1956–57)
- Consecutive appearances: 83 Gary Broadbent (C)
