= Kells, Whitehaven =

Coordinates: 54.540°N 3.596°W

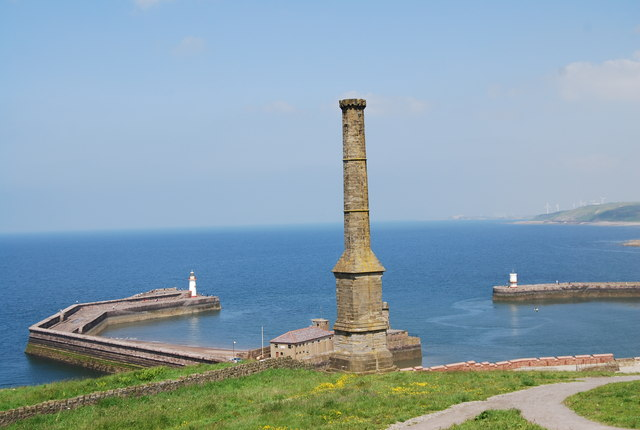
The Candlestick Chimney, a ventilation shaft for a coal mine, marks the northern end of Kells

Kells is an area of Whitehaven in Cumbria, England, elevated on a cliff to the south of the town centre, overlooking the Irish Sea. The population of this ward at the 2011 census was 2,437. Kells was built as a coal mining community.

A cable railway, the Corkickle Brake, was opened in 1881 to connect the pits at the top of the steep incline to the railway line in Whitehaven town below. As the pits closed, the Corkickle Brake was abandoned in 1932. It was re-opened in 1955 to serve the Marchon chemical works (later a division of Albright and Wilson) in Kells. When the Brake was again closed in 1986, it was the last standard gauge cable railway operating in the UK.

With the change from phosphate-based detergents, the Marchon works was the victim of a gradual winding down process and finally closed in 2006.

Kells Amateur Rugby League Football Club was first formed in 1931, and played in the Cumberland League winning every trophy for a number of years. Kells left the Cumberland League in 2012 to start life in division 3 of the national conference and won division 3 and division 2 at the first attempt.

== Roads ==
There are 20 roads in total on Kells, they are all listed in this section in no particular order. The roads listed are roads recognised by satellites and roads that you are able to drive on (Ginns to Kells is not on Kells but it leads up to Ennerdale Terrace which is on Kells).

Road Name
High Road
Ginns to Kells Road
Ennerdale Terrace
College View
South Row
West Row
Mid Street
Monkwray Brow
North Row
Solway Road
Central Road
York Road
Cliff Road
Saltom Road
Hilltop Road
Monkwray Cottages
Thwaiteville
Basket Road
Harbour View
Rosemary Lane
