= Hensingham =

Suburb of Whitehaven, Cumbria, England

Coordinates: 54.535°N 3.560°W

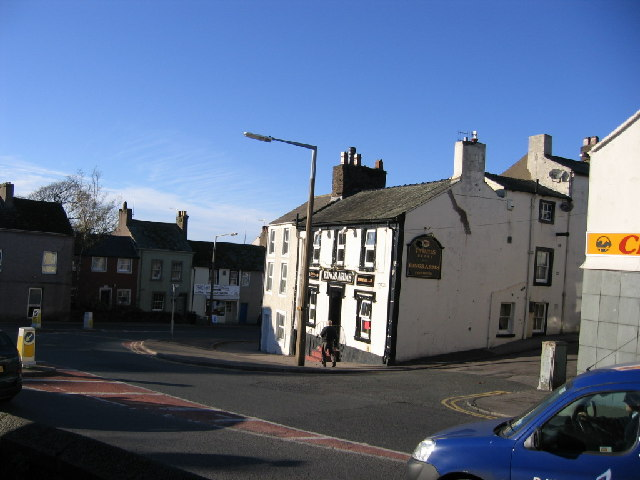
- Hensingham Square

- Location in Copeland Borough Location within Cumbria
- Population: 4,145 (2011)
- OS grid reference: NX990166
- Civil parish: Whitehaven
- Unitary authority: Cumberland
- Ceremonial county: Cumbria
- Region: North West
- Country: England
- Sovereign state: United Kingdom
- Post town: WHITEHAVEN
- Postcode district: CA28
- Dialling code: 01946
- Police: Cumbria
- Fire: Cumbria
- Ambulance: North West
- UK Parliament: Whitehaven and Workington

Hensingham is a suburb of Whitehaven and former civil parish, now in the parish of Whitehaven, in the Cumberland district, in the ceremonial county of Cumbria, England. The ward population taken at the 2011 census was 4,145.

Historically in Cumberland, the village is located to the south-east of Whitehaven on the A595 road, close to the Mirehouse Housing Estate and Moresby Parks. It has a Spar convenience store and several pubs – including the Distressed Sailor and the Lowther Arms. It is close to Whitehaven Fire Station and to three schools; Hensingham Primary School, St Benedict's Roman Catholic High School and Whitehaven Academy. In Hensingham is the West Cumberland Hospital, the first hospital built in England after the creation of the National Health Service. It was officially opened on 21 October 1964 by Queen Elizabeth the Queen Mother. St John's Church is an evangelical Anglican church in this suburb.

== Sport ==
Hensingham have one of the oldest rugby clubs in the country. Hensingham ARLFC are an amateur Rugby league based in Whitehaven. Founded in 1900, it wasn't until 1920 that the Club changed its allegiances to Rugby League. They now play their rugby in the National Conference League Division 3.

== History ==
Hensingham was formerly a chapelry in St. Bees parish, from 1866 Hensingham was a civil parish in its own right until it was abolished on 1 April 1934 and merged with Weddicar and Whitehaven. In 1931 the parish had a population of 2116.
