= Cumberland County Cup =

Amateur rugby league competition

The Cumberland County Cup is the second oldest rugby league knock-out competition in the world after the Challenge Cup. It is open to every amateur club in the county of Cumberland and is administered by British Amateur Rugby League Association.

The first competition was held in 1902-03 and the winners were Brookland Rovers from the town of Maryport.

== List of finals ==
Year	Winners	Score	Runner-up	Venue
1902-03	Brookland Rovers	4-0	Seaton	Recreation Ground, Whitehaven
1903-04	Seaton	2-2; 5-2	Parton	Athletic Ground, Maryport; Lonsdale Park, Workington
1904-05	Parton	5-2	Brookland Rovers	Lonsdale Park, Workington
1905-06	Whitehaven Rec	7-0	Egremont	Lonsdale Park, Workington
1906-07	Whitehaven Rec	17-8	Maryport	Lonsdale Park, Workington
1907-08	Workington	10-4	Highmoor Rovers	Netherton
1908-09	Egremont	5-0	Brookland Rovers	Lonsdale Park, Workington
1909-10	Dearham United	4-0	Broughton Moor	Netherton
1910-11	Millom	16-11	Brookland Rovers	Egremont
1911-12	Millom	16-15	Seaton	Netherton
1912-13	Seaton	10-2	Millom	Netherton
1913-14	Seaton	11-10	Brookland Rovers	Grasslot
1919-20	Brookland Rovers	4-0	Broughton Moor	Glasson
1920-21	Seaton Rangers	13-2	Millom	Netherton
1921-22	Aspatria Hornets	9-5	Millom	Netherton
1922-23	Egremont Rangers	8-7	Dearham Wanderers	Workington
1923-24	Glasson Rangers	5-3	Flimby & Fothergill	Netherton
1924-25	Flimby & Fothergill	10-0	Millom	
1925-26	Dearham Wanderers	2-0	Hensingham	Whitehaven
1926-27	Dearham Wanderers	3-0	Glasson Rangers	
1927-28	Hensingham	9-0	Maryport	
1928-29	Egremont Rangers	0-0; 4-3	Hensingham	
1929-30	Glasson Rangers	7-4	Great Clifton	
1930-31	Great Clifton	10-2	Egremont Rangers	West Seaton
1931-32	Glasson Rangers	6-4	Great Clifton	
1932-33	Flimby	5-0	Brookland Rovers	
1933-34	Brookland Rovers	8-2	Aspatria Hornets	
1934-35	Kells	12-4	Great Clifton	
1935-36	Kells	15-3	Netherton	
1936-37	Glasson Rangers	12-5	Netherton	Bradford Avenue, Maryport
1937-38	Glasson Rangers	12-5	Netherton	Bradford Avenue, Maryport
1938-39		-		
1944-45	Risehow & Gillhead	-		
1945-46	Risehow & Gillhead	-		
1946-47		-	Risehow & Gillhead	
1947-48	Risehow & Gillhead	25-0	Millom	
1948-49	Broughton Moor	5-2	Glasson Rangers	
1949-50	Maryport	17-4	Risehow & Gillhead	
1950-51	Risehow & Gillhead	7-6	Glasson Rangers	
1951-52	Risehow & Gillhead	7-6	Glasson Rangers	
1952-53		-		
1953-54	Brookland Rovers	20-8	Egremont	
1954-55	Egremont	-		
1955-56	Egremont	-		
1956-57	Egremont	-		
1957-58		-		
1958-59		-		
1959-60		-		
1960-61		-		
1961-62		-		
1962-63		-		
1963-64		-		
1964-65		-		
1965-66		-		
1966-67		-		
1967-68		-		
1968-69		-		
1969-70		-		
1970-71	Seaton Rangers	-		
1971-72	Maryport	-		
1973-73		-		
1973-74	Seaton Rangers	-		
1974-75	Broughton Red Rose	-		
1975-76	Broughton Red Rose	-		
1976-77	Broughton Red Rose	-		
1977-78	Ellenborough Rangers	21-15	Egremont Rangers	Kells
1978-79	Kells	30-0	Ellenborough Rangers	
1979-80		-		
1980-81		-		
1981-82		-		
1982-83	Kells	15-11	Hensingham	
1983-84	Kells	14-13	Wath Brow Hornets	
1984-85	Glasson Rangers	14-10	Ulverston	
1985-86	Kells	34-12	Lowca	
1986-87	Kells	20-12	Egremont Rangers	
1987-88	Kells	36-7	Wath Brow Hornets	
1988-89	Barrow Island	16-10	Kells	
1989-90	Millom	9-8	Kells	
1990-91	Hensingham	7-0	Millom	
1991-92	Kells	14-8	Ellenborough Rangers	
1992-93	Kells	2-0	Hensingham	
1993-94	Hensingham	11-4	Kells	
1994-95	Walney Island	18-16	Hensingham	
1995-96	Ellenborough Rangers	26-0	Barrow Island	
1996-97	Ellenborough Rangers	44-16	Westfield	
1997-98	Ellenborough Rangers	28-14	Broughton Red Rose	
1998-99	Wath Brow Hornets	16-10	Ellenborough Rangers	
1999-00	Wath Brow Hornets	32-12	Hensingham	
2000-01	Wath Brow Hornets	32-6	Egremont Rangers	
2001-02	Wath Brow Hornets	44-0	Kells	
2002-03	Seaton Rangers	-	Hensingham	
2003-04		-		
2004-05		-		
2005-06		-		
2006-07		-		
2007-08	Wath Brow Hornets	-		
2008-09	Wath Brow Hornets	def.	Distington	Hensingham
2012	Kells	-		
