= Recreation Ground (Whitehaven) =

Rugby stadium in Whitehaven, England

Ortus REC
- Recre
- Interactive map of Ortus REC
- Location: Whitehaven, Cumbria
- Coordinates: 54°32′23″N 3°35′3″W
- Capacity: 8603
- Surface: Grass
- Record attendance: 18,650 v Wakefield Trinity

Construction
- Groundbreaking: 1933
- Built: 1948
- Opened: 1948
- Renovated: 1973
- Expanded: 1995

Tenant
- Whitehaven (1948-) Cumbria rugby league team

The Recreation Ground (known locally as the 'Recre') and for sponsorship reasons the Ortus REC is a rugby league stadium in Whitehaven, Cumbria, England. It is the home of Whitehaven R.L.F.C.

The ground has witnessed many other sports such as football, boxing, speedway and whippet racing.

== Stadium ==
The ground now has terracing on 3 sides with one end of ground, the Kells end, covered. The other sides are known the Popular side, the Railway end and the LLWR Grandstand which seats 556. The ground is set to have a second seated stand holding 1,100 people where the Popular side terracing now stands. The current ground capacity is 7,500.

There is a disabled supporters view area in the grandstand with disabled toilets located within the ground while the JJ McKeown bar has disabled access.

Matchday parking is available on the Whitehaven Miners' car park adjacent to the stadium main entrance.

== History ==
The Recreation Ground was originally the playing fields for local coal miners dating back to Victorian times and was owned by the Miners' Welfare organisation. The ground was used for junior sides and hosted a Challenge Cup match when the juniors beat St. Helens 13-8 in front of 2,000 spectators.

It was an enclosed field with one wooden stand and opened in 1933. Today the link with the Miners' Welfare poses a potential brake on any outside investment in the ground itself which remains an obstacle in Whitehaven's attempts to join Super League.

The Recreation Ground in its current form was built in 1948 to enable the newly formed Whitehaven to play in the Rugby Football League.

The ground's record attendance was set in 1960 when 18,650 spectators turned up for a third round Challenge Cup game against Wakefield Trinity.

The Kells end stand steel framework was built in 1961.

In 1973 the ground acquired floodlights.

The old wooden grandstand was demolished in 1995 and the B&H Motors Grandstand was built to replace it.

Work began on the stadium in late November 2014 to meet RFL operating rules for Championship clubs for 2015. The Kells end stand was shot blasted, the steel framework repainted and the cladding replaced with new galvanised sheeting. In addition, new changing facilities under the grandstand were built. The next phase of the work to commence later in 2005 is to upgrade the floodlights and increase the ground’s seating capacity to meet RFL requirements. Britain’s Energy Coast financed the improvements.

In April 2021 the club announced that as part of a sponsorship deal with Cumbrian engineering firm Lifttech Engineering Limited the ground would be rebranded as the LEL Arena for the period of the deal - initially three years.

== Rugby league internationals ==
The Recreation Ground has played host to just two rugby league international matches in its history.

Test#	Date	Result	Attendance	Notes
1	4 February 1926	England def. Other Nationalities 37–11	10,000	
2	17 November 2000	(United Kingdom) BARLA def. Japan 54–0		2000 Rugby League Emerging Nations Tournament

== Rugby league tour matches ==
The Recreation Ground has also played host to various international touring and domestic teams.

Game#	Date	Result	Attendance	Notes
1	24 October 1908	Australia def. (Cumbria) Cumberland 52–10	4,000	1908–09 Kangaroo tour
2	9 December 1933	(Cumbria) Cumberland def. Australia 17–16	5,800	1933–34 Kangaroo tour
3	14 October 1948	(Cumbria) Cumberland def. Australia 5–4	8,818	1948–49 Kangaroo tour
4	13 September 1952	Australia def. Whitehaven 15–5	9,253	1952–53 Kangaroo tour
5	20 October 1956	Whitehaven def. Australia 14–11	10,840	1956–57 Kangaroo tour
6	22 October 1959	Australia def. Whitehaven / Workington XIII 13–8	7,463	1959–60 Kangaroo tour
7	24 October 1973	Australia def. (Cumbria) Cumberland 28–2	3,666	1973 Kangaroo tour
8	8 October 1980	Cumbria def. New Zealand 9–3	4,070	1980 New Zealand Kiwis tour
9	19 October 2003	Cumbria drew with New Zealand A 24–24	4,124	
10	3 October 2010	Cumbria drew with England 18–18	5,250	
11	22 October 2011	England Knights def. Cumbria 26–12	1,163	
