= Cumbria Rugby League =

Sports competitions in Cumbria, England

- Founded: 1899
- Country: England
- Level on pyramid: 4
- Promotion to: National Conference Cumbria
- Current: 2025

Cumbria Rugby League is a series of summer rugby league competitions for amateur teams in Cumbria.

The main competition in Cumbria is the Iggesund Cumberland ARL, which has existed since 1899. Along with the Cumberland ARL, Cumbria Rugby League also runs the Barrow and District Leagues (open age and youth) along with the West Cumbria Youth League. The leagues are jointly administered with the British Amateur Rugby League Association.

Cumbria Rugby League itself was formed during the Rugby Football League's 2012 restructuring of amateur rugby league in Great Britain.

== History ==
The Cumberland League has been in existence, in one form or another, since 1899. Millom, in 1897, was the first club in the county to defect from rugby union to Northern Union, they were followed a year later by Workington, Maryport, Whitehaven, Seaton, Brookland Rovers and Wath Brow. The first three named joined with Lancaster and the Furness clubs Barrow, Dalton and Askam to form the North Western League in 1898/99. The first champions were Millom who finished just ahead of Barrow.

On 10 May 1899 the Cumberland clubs met at the Grapes Hotel in Workington and agreed to form a Cumberland Senior League for the following season. They voted W.E. Mason (Whitehaven) to chair the new competition and R. Nixon (Maryport) was elected Hon. Secretary.

The participants in that first season, 1899/1900, were Brookland Rovers, Maryport, Seaton, Whitehaven, Whitehaven Rec and Workington.

In 2024, suggestions were made that the league could return to winter due to a number of fixtures cancellations caused by clubs being unable to field teams in the summer months.

== Iggesund Cumberland ARL ==
=== Premier Division ===
Season	League Leaders	Champions	Score	Runners up
1899/1900	Maryport			
1900/01	Maryport			
1901/02	Seaton	Seaton	5-3	Whitehaven Rec
1902/03	Maryport	Maryport	18-0	Seaton
1903/04	Maryport	Not played		
1904/05	Parton	Parton	0-0 5-2	Brookland Rovers
1905/06	Whitehaven Rec			
1906/07	Millom	Workington	25-3	Millom
1907/08	Workington	Workington	WO	Whitehaven Rec
1908/09	Workington	Workington	6-5	Egremont
1909/10	Broughton Moor	Broughton Moor	8-0	Brookland Rovers
1910/11	Broughton Moor	Brookland Rovers	2-0	Broughton Moor
1911/12	Seaton	Seaton	10-5	Brookland Rovers
1912/13	Seaton	Seaton	29-0	Fothergill United
1913/14	Seaton	Seaton	23-3	Broughton Moor
1914/15	Cancelled due to the First World War			
1915/16	Cancelled due to the First World War			
1916/17	Cancelled due to the First World War			
1917/18	Cancelled due to the First World War			
1918/19	Cancelled due to the First World War			
1919/20	Brookland Rovers	Brookland Rovers	7-5	Broughton Moor
1920/21		Dearham Wanderers	14-4	Seaton
1921/22	Broughton Moor	Broughton Moor	7-5	Wath Brow Hornets
1922/23	Brookland Rovers	Brookland Rovers	2-0	Aspatria Hornets
1923/24		Glasson Rangers	5-3	Flimby & Fothergill Utd
1924/25		Brookland Rovers	3-0	Flimby & Fothergill Utd
1925/26	Hensingham	Hensingham	vs.	Dearham/Brookland
1926/27	Dearham Wanderers	Dearham Wanderers	11-0	Brookland Rovers
1927/28	Dearham Wanderers	Dearham Wanderers	20-0	Whitehaven Rec
1928/29	Whitehaven Rec	Glasson Rangers	2-0	Whitehaven Rec
1929/30	Great Clifton	Glasson Rangers	12-5	Great Clifton
1930/31	Great Clifton	Egremont Rangers	5-2	Great Clifton
1931/32	Glasson Rangers	Glasson Rangers	2-0	Flimby
1932/33	Flimby	Flimby	4-0	Great Clifton
1933/34	Dearham Wanderers	Dearham Wanderers	5-2	Kells
1934/35	Kells	Flimby	6-0	Kells
1935/36	Glasson Rangers	Glasson Rangers	11-3	Maryport
1936/37		Netherton	6-0	Broughton
1937/38		Glasson Rangers	21-0	Maryport
1938/39	Glasson Rangers	Glasson Rangers		
1939/40	Cancelled due to the Second World War			
1940/41	Cancelled due to the Second World War			
1941/42	Cancelled due to the Second World War			
1942/43	Cancelled due to the Second World War			
1943/44	Cancelled due to the Second World War			
1944/45	Cancelled due to the Second World War			
1945/46				
1946/47				
1947/48				
1948/49				
1949/50				
1950/51				
1951/52				
1952/53				
1953/54				
1954/55				
1955/56				
1956/57				
1957/58				
1958/59				
1959/60				
1960/61				
1961/62				
1962/63				
1963/64				
1964/65				
1965/66				
1966/67				
1967/68				
1968/69				
1969/70				
1970/71				
1971/72				
1972/73				
1973/74	Seaton Rangers			
1974/75	Maryport	Maryport		
1975/76	Wath Brow Hornets			
1976/77	Wath Brow Hornets			
1977/78				
1978/79	Lowca	Ellenborough Rangers	14-0	Lowca
1979/80	Lowca			
1980/81				
1981/82	Kells	Glasson Rangers		
1982/83		Kells	12-8	Lowca
1983/84	Great Clifton Lions	Egremont Rangers	def.	Great Clifton Lions
1984/85	Egremont Rangers			
1985/86				
1986/87				
1987/88				
1988/89	Hensingham			
1989/90	Kells			
1990/91	Ellenborough Rangers			
1991/92	Ellenborough Rangers			
1992/93	Ellenborough Rangers			
1993/94	Hensingham			

Season	Champions	Score	Runners up
1994/95	Ellenborough Rangers	def.	Hensingham
1995/96	Wath Brow Hornets		
1996/97	Ellenborough Rangers	def.	Westfield
1997/98	Ellenborough Rangers	22-6	Wath Brow Hornets
1998/99	Ellenborough Rangers	28-12	Wath Brow Hornets
1999/2000	Hensingham	29-16	Wath Brow Hornets
2000/01	Wath Brow Hornets	28-18	Ellenborough Rangers
2001/02	Wath Brow Hornets		
2002/03	Hensingham		
2003/04	Seaton Rangers	def.	Hensingham
2004/05	Kells	52-10	Egremont Rangers
2005/06	Seaton Rangers	def.	
2006/07			
2007/08			
2008/09			
2009/10			
2010/11			
2012			
2013			
2014			
2015			
2016			
2017			
2018			
2019			
2020	Cancelled due to the COVID-19 pandemic		
2021	Cancelled due to the COVID-19 pandemic		
2022	Distington	24-22	Ellenborough
2023	Wath Brow Hornets A	11-10	Distington
2024	Wath Brow Hornets A	34-8	Maryport
2025	Seaton Rangers	48-6	Maryport

=== Division One ===
Year	League Leaders	Play Off Final		
Year	League Leaders	Winner	Result	Runner-up

== Cumbria Men's League ==
In 2013, a short lived "Cumbria Men's League" was created for the higher performing teams of the Cumberland ARL competition. Winners are:

- 2013: Walney Central
- 2014: Walney Central
- 2015: Walney Central
- 2016: Distington ARLFC
- 2017: Hensingham ARLFC

The competition ceased following the 2017 season.

== See also ==
- British Amateur Rugby League Association
- British rugby league system
- BARLA Cumbria Cup
