= Workington Town =

English rugby league club

Club information
- Full name: Workington Town Rugby League Football Club
- Nickname(s): Town; Worky
- Colours: Blue and white
- Founded: 1945; 81 years ago
- Website: townrlfc.com

Current details
- Ground: Derwent Park (10,000)
- Chairman: Graeme Peel
- Coach: Brad Singleton
- Captain: tbc
- Competition: Championship
- 2026 season: 18th
- Current season

Uniforms
Home colours

Records
- Premierships: 1 (1951)
- Runners-up: 1 (1958)
- Challenge Cups: 1 (1952)
- Lancashire Cup: 1 (1978)
- Second Division: 1 (1992/93)
- Western Division Championship: 1 (1962/63)

Workington Town is a semi-professional rugby league club based in Workington, West Cumbria, England. The club plays home games at Derwent Park and competes in the RFL Championship, the second tier of British rugby league.

Workington have won the League Championship once in 1951 and Challenge Cup in 1952.

The club's traditional home colours are a white shirt with a blue band. Their main rivals are Whitehaven, while they also have a Cumbrian rivalry with Barrow Raiders.

== History ==
=== 1944–1945: Establishment ===
Former logo

Workington Town RLFC was formed at a meeting held in the Royal Oak Hotel, Workington in December 1944. Many of Workington Town's board came from local football team Workington AFC's board and the team would ground share with "the Reds" at Borough Park. It was decided at the meeting that the club should be registered as a business and that an application for membership of the Rugby Football League should be submitted. From those in attendance at that meeting the first board of directors was formed and the application for membership was agreed at a meeting held on 23 January 1945 at the Grosvenor Hotel, Manchester. They were the first side from Cumberland to enter the professional rugby league.

They first played their home games, wearing green and red hoops, at Borough Park. The first match against Broughton Rangers on Saturday 25 August 1945 attracted a crowd of 4,100 to Borough Park. Workington went on to win 27–5.

In their first season, they achieved the distinction of losing to an amateur side, Sharlston Rovers in the first round of the Challenge Cup, a very rare occurrence in those days. However, the first round was a two leg affair, and they were able to make amends in the return leg and progress to the second round.

=== 1946–1969: Golden era ===
Gus Risman joined Workington Town as player-coach in August 1946 when they had been in the Rugby League for only one season. In his eight years at the club, he made them into a team capable of beating Wigan or anyone else in the league. There was a club record 20,403 for the third round cup game against St. Helens. Town finished third of 29 clubs but had a tough draw; the only Yorkshire teams they played were Bradford, Leeds, Halifax, Keighley and York. They played these five home and away as well as all the teams from Lancashire. All the top four that season were all from the Western side of the Pennines and Workington went on to become rugby league champions in 1951. After beating reigning champions Wigan by 8-5 away at Central Park in the play-off semi-final, Town became champions themselves for the one, and so far only, time by beating Warrington in the final held at Maine Road, Manchester by 26-11. Warrington raced into an early 8-0 lead after 30 mins before a try from Paskins and 2 tries each from Gibson and Wilson, supplemented by 3 goal kicks from Risman, brought the title to Cumbria.

The following season they then beat Featherstone Rovers 18–10 in front of a crowd of 72,093 at Wembley Stadium to become Challenge Cup winners; this was the first final to be televised. No other club, before or after, has lifted both these trophies within such a short period of their formation. During the 1954–55 season, Workington Town made it to the Challenge Cup final but were beaten 21–12 by Barrow. Owing to tension between the football club's manager Bill Shankly and the Town manager, Gus Risman and director Tom Mitchell, Town moved out of Borough Park in 1956 and took a 150-year lease on the land at Derwent Park and built a new stadium.

Workington Town lost in the 1958 Challenge Cup final to Wigan and one week later, they lost in the Championship final at Odsal Stadium, Bradford.

In 1962, the league was split into East and West of the Pennines; Widnes and Workington Town met at Central Park, Wigan, in the first final of the Western Division Championship on Saturday 10 November 1962. With two minutes remaining, Syd Lowdon dropped a goal to earn Workington a 9–9 draw. Later in the month Workington won the replay 10–0.

The record attendance at Derwent Park was set in 1965 when 17,741 spectators turned up for a third round Challenge Cup match against Wigan.

=== 1970–1995 ===
The early 1970s brought demise of Town as a power in the game and the fans dropped off making it very difficult for the management to come up with the cash to bring in top class players who were being enticed out of the county to other clubs. Paul Charlton took over as player-coach in 1975 and guided them to promotion. Local players returned to the club and a team consisting mainly of home grown players started to bring back glory to the Town by appearing in a Lancashire Cup Final in October 1976. They appeared in a further three finals in consecutive season winning the trophy by defeating Wigan in the 1977 final.

The last of those four finals was staged at Salford's Willows ground on Saturday 8 December 1979, and attracted a crowd of 6,887. Widnes were firm favourites to lift the cup and held the Cumbrians at bay to register an 11–0 victory. Probably as a result of the three previous finals, several top class forwards caught the eye of the wealthy Lancashire clubs who enticed them away from Derwent Park.

Tommy Bishop was coach between 1981 and 1982. The 1980s were the lowest era in the club's history as it saw Town mainly as a yo-yo side going in and out of the first division but mostly wallowing halfway down the second. During this period, the fan base practically disappeared, and as the 1990s arrived it was third division rugby status.

Peter Walsh joined Town as Head Coach in the summer of 1992. Town were beaten finalists in the 1992–93 Divisional Premiership going down to Featherstone Rovers while in the Third Division. Workington won the Second Division Championship and Divisional Premiership trophy double in 1993–94, the Divisional Premiership was won over London Crusaders at Old Trafford, Manchester. That took them into the top flight of rugby league and Town finished ninth in the Stones Bitter Championship.

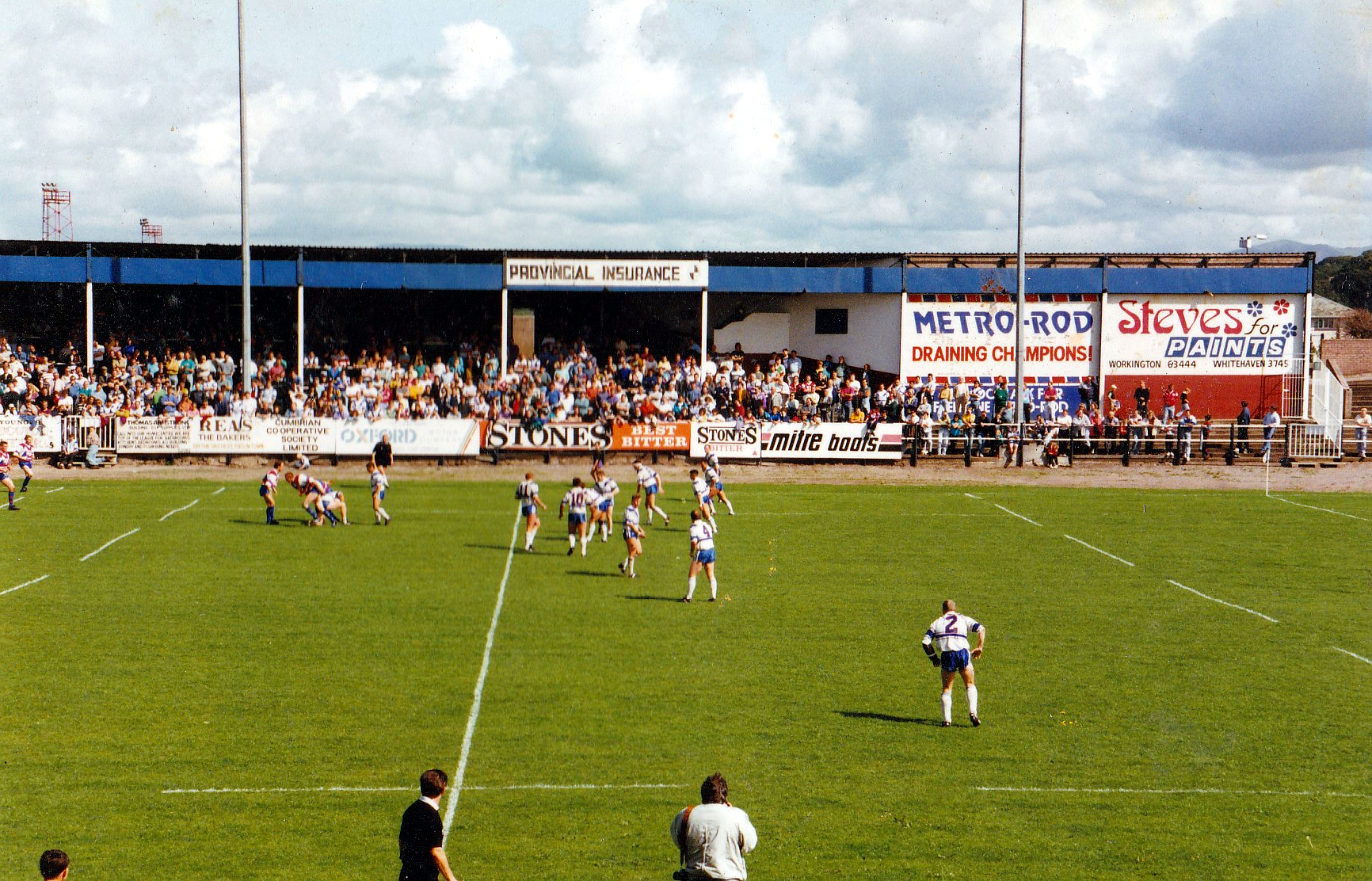
Leeds on the attack against Workington Town at Derwent Park in August 1994

Peter Walsh quit as the coach of Workington Town to return to Australia in July 1995.

=== 1996–present: Summer era ===
When the Super League was set up, it was proposed that Workington merge with Barrow, Carlisle and Whitehaven to form a Cumbrian super club to be based at Workington. This was, however, resisted and an unmerged Workington took part in Super League but would record only two wins all season. They finished bottom of the table and were relegated to the Northern Ford Premiership with significant debts.

In 2002 Town dropped into National League Two as a result of losing to Dewsbury in what was the fore-runner of the National League Two Grand Final. Billy McGinty took over as coach on 25 May 2003.

In 2003, Ged Stokes was in charge of the New Zealand A-team on their tour of England. At the end of the tour, he was offered the vacant coaching job at Town. Workington were at a low ebb and had only seven players in their squad.

A Challenge Cup game against Leeds brought a large crowd that allowed the club to clear their debts. Assistant coaches Craig Barker and Les Ashe took over and led the team to the Elimination Semi-final but they were defeated by Oldham. A few weeks after Town's 2007 season had come to a close, Town appointed Whitehaven coach Dave Rotheram as their new coach. In Rotheram's first season in charge Town finished eighth in National League Two with only six wins from their twenty two games and were eliminated in the first round of the play-offs at Keighley.

Following a poor start to the 2009 season, with Town only gaining two wins up to that point, Dave Rotherham decided to step down. He was replaced in July 2009 by joint coaches Martin Oglanby and Gary Charlton.

2011 was a much better year with Town reaching the 2011 Championship 1 Grand Final by defeating Keighley 19–10 in the elimination semi-final. In 2021 Workington were promoted to the English Rugby League Championship, with a 36-12 win over Doncaster in the League 1 play-off final. In Workington Town's first game back in the Championship, they were defeated 20-6 by Newcastle Thunder. In the 2022 RFL Championship season, Workington Town were relegated back to League 1 after finishing bottom of the table. Workington managed to win only one match for the entire year. Workington finished the 2023 League 1 season in 5th place. The following year in 2024, the club finished 6th on the table.

== 2027 squad ==
Workington Town 2027 squad
First team squad			Coaching staff
(England) Jack Ainley – SR; (England) Jake Bradley – SR; (England) Jake Carter – SO, SH; (Ireland) Lucas Castle – PR; (Nigeria) Rio Corkill – LF, CE; (England) Jake Dickinson – WG; (England) Jamie Doran – SH, HK; (Australia) Tanna Featherstone – WG; (Australia) Harry Fraser – HK, LF	(Wales) Spencer Fulton – CE, WG; (Malta) Zarrin Galea – FB, WG; (Scotland) Guy Graham – PR; (Australia) Corey Herdegen – SO; (Australia) Braden Leigh – CE; (England) Jude Lupton – HK; (England) Charlie McCurrie – SR, LF, PR; (England) Grant Reid – PR	(Australia) Marcus Spence – CE, WG; (England) Jack Stephenson – LF, SR; (England) Jaiden Tallantire – FB, SO; (England) Tyce Walmsley – LF; (Australia) Bear Williams – PR; (England) Tom Wilkinson – LF	Head coach: Brad Singleton; Assistant coaches: Dean Marwood; Perry Singleton; Legend: (c) Captain(s); (vc) Vice-captain(s); Updated: Source(s):

== 2027 transfers ==
=== Gains ===
Player	From	Contract	Date
(Australia) Corey Herdegen	Ipswich Jets	1 year	25 October 2026
(England) Tom Wilkinson		1 year	31 October 2026
(Australia) Marcus Spence	Western Clydesdales	1 year	8 November 2026
(England) Charlie McCurrie	Swinton Lions	1 year	17 November 2026

=== Losses ===
Player	To	Contract	Date
(England) Callum Farrer	Wath Brow Hornets		28 September 2026
(New Zealand) Tuarae Rawhiti			28 September 2026
(England) Ross Ainley	Whitehaven	1 year	9 October 2026
(England) Mason Lewthwaite	Whitehaven	2 years	3 November 2026
(England) Dom Wear	Whitehaven	2 years	20 November 2026
(England) Evan Lawther	Newcastle Thunder	1 year	3 November 2026
(England) Tobias Gibson	Newcastle Thunder	1 year	4 November 2026
(England) Oscar Doran	Newcastle Thunder	1 year	5 November 2026

=== Retired ===
Player	Date
(England) Stevie Scholey	25 August 2026
(Scotland) Callum Phillips	28 August 2026
(England) Alex Donaghy	21 October 2026

== Stadium ==
=== 1944–1956: Borough Park ===
Workington moved into Borough Park in 1944 and shared it with association football club Workington AFC. Owing to tension between the football club's manager Bill Shankly and the Town manager, Gus Risman and director Tom Mitchell, Town took a 150-year lease on the land at Derwent Park and moved out in 1956.

=== 1956–present ===
Town built a stadium on the ground they squired after leaving Borough Park in 1956 and won the RFL Championship whilst playing there. The record attendance at Derwent Park was set in 1965 when 17,741 spectators turned up for a third round Challenge Cup match against Wigan. The football pitch at Derwent Park is surrounded by a 364 metres (398 yards) motorcycle speedway track.

The modern Workington side plays at a far lower level than its 1950s equivalent. Although they have struggled to match earlier achievements, Town maintains a dedicated support, also attracting some big name, former Super League players.

== Players ==
=== Players earning international caps while at Workington Town ===
- Harry Beverley won caps for England while at Dewsbury 1975 Australia, while at Workington 1979 Wales
- Edward "Eddie" Bowman won caps for Great Britain while at Workington 1977 France, New Zealand, Australia (2 matches)
- Paul Charlton won caps for England while at Salford 1975 France won caps for Great Britain while at Workington 1965 New Zealand, while at Salford 1970 New Zealand (sub), 1972 France (2 matches), Australia (2 matches), France, New Zealand, 1973 Australia (3 matches), 1974 France (2 matches), Australia (3 matches), New Zealand (3 matches) (World Cup 1970 1-cap, 1972 4-caps, 1-try)
- Gareth Dean won caps for Wales while at Wigan, unattached, Workington Town, AS Carcassonne, and Celtic Crusaders 2001...2007 7(10, 12?)-caps + 4-caps (sub)
- Brian Edgar won caps for England while at Workington 1962 France won caps for Great Britain while at Workington 1958 Australia, New Zealand, 1961 New Zealand, 1962 Australia (3 matches), New Zealand, 1965 New Zealand, 1966 Australia (3 matches)
- Kevin Ellis won caps for Wales while at Warrington, Workington Town, and Bridgend Blue Bulls 1991...2004 14(15?)-caps + 1-cap (sub) 2(5?)-tries (1-drop-goal?) 13(21?)-points
- David Fraisse won caps for France while at Workington 1995 ?-caps
- Bruce Gibbs won caps for Other Nationalities while at Workington circa-1975 ?-caps
- Edward "Eppie" Gibson won caps for England while at Workington 1947 France, 1951 Other Nationalities, Wales, 1953 Other Nationalities
- Ray Glastonbury won a cap for Wales while at Workington Town 1963 1-cap
- Leslie "Les" Gorley won caps for England while at Workington 1977 Wales, 1981 Wales (sub) won caps for Great Britain while at Widnes 1980 New Zealand, New Zealand (sub), 1981 France (2 matches), 1982 Australia
- James "Jimmy" Hayton won caps for England while at Workington 1949 Other Nationalities
- John Henderson won a cap for England while at Workington 1953 Wales
- Norman Herbert won caps for England while at Workington 1962 France won caps for Great Britain while at Workington 1961 New Zealand, 1962 France, Australia (3 matches), New Zealand
- Stephen Holgate won caps for England while at Workington 1995 France
- Lynn Hopkins won a cap for Wales while at Workington Town 1982 1-cap 1-goal 2-points
- Frederick "Fred" Hughes won caps for Wales while at Barrow, and Workington Town 1945...1946 3-caps
- William "Billy" Ivison won caps for England while at Workington in 1949 against Wales, and Other Nationalities, in 1951 against Other Nationalities, in 1952 against Other Nationalities, and won caps for British Empire XIII while at Workington Town on Wednesday 23 January 1952 against New Zealand at Stamford Bridge, and represented Great Britain while at Workington Town in 1952 against France (non-Test matches).[3]
- Mark Johnson won caps for South Africa while at Workington 1995 ?-caps
- John "Johnny" Lawrenson won caps for England while at Wigan: 1939 Wales, 1940 Wales, 1941 Wales, 1946 Wales (2 matches), 1948 Wales, France, 1949 Wales, Other Nationalities, while at Workington: 1950 [Opposition?] won caps for Great Britain while at Wigan 1948 Australia (3 matches)
- Vivian 'Vince' McKeating won caps for England while at Workington 1951 Wales, France won caps for Great Britain while at Workington 1951 New Zealand (2 matches)
- William "Bill" Martin won a cap for Great Britain while at Workington in 1962 against France
- John "Johnny" 'Rupert' Mudge won caps for Other Nationalities while at Workington Town circa-1951 ?-caps
- William "Bill" Pattinson won caps for England while at Workington 1981 France (sub), Wales
- Tony Paskins won caps for Other Nationalities while at Workington Town 1948...55 11-caps
- Albert Pepperell won a cap for British Empire XIII while at Workington in 1952 against New Zealand, and won caps for Great Britain while at Workington in 1950 against New Zealand, and in 1951 against New Zealand
- Rowland Phillips won caps for Wales while at Warrington, and, Workington Town 1991...1996(1998?) 7(15, 14?)-caps + 10-caps (sub) 2-tries 8-points
- John Risman won caps for Wales while at Workington Town 1978...1979 2(3?)-caps + 1-cap (sub)
- Ike Southward won caps for Great Britain while at Workington
- Raymond "Ray" Wilkins won caps for Wales while at Workington Town 1977 1(2?)-caps + 1-cap (sub)
- George 'Happy' Wilson caps won for South of Scotland (RU) while at Kelso RFC 1947, 3-caps won for Other Nationalities while at Workington, 3-caps won for Great Britain RL while at Workington 1951 New Zealand (3 matches) (signed for Workington [date?])

=== Other notable former players ===
These players have either; played in a Challenge Cup, or Rugby Football League Championship final, received a Testimonial match, are "Hall of Fame" inductees, played during Workington Town's Super League I season, or were international representatives before, or after, their time at Workington Town, or are notable outside of rugby league.

- Terrence "Terry" Ackerley (#9) circa-1962
- Harry Archer (#6) circa-1962...65
- Colin Armstrong circa-1990s
- David Beck (Wing) circa-1990 (Testimonial match 1988)
- Eric Bell (#3) circa-1965
- Edward "Eddie" Brennan (#4) circa-1962
- John "Jock" Carr (#5) circa-1948
- Anthony "Tony" Colloby (#5) circa-1965
- Des Drummond, 1993–95 – former Great Britain international
- Kevin Ellis, 1994–95, former Great Britain & Wales international.
- Colin Falcon (Hooker) circa-1990 (Testimonial match 1990)
- Ken Foord (to Parramatta circa-1961)
- Frank Foster
- Ken Goodall
- Peter Gorley (Younger brother of Leslie "Les" Gorley)
- Ian Hartley (Testimonial match 1985)
- Brad Hepi 1992–1995
- Douglas "Doug" Holland circa-1957
- Mike Jackson (to Parramatta circa-1962)
- Andrew "Andy" Key circa-1957
- Wayne Kitchin, son of Phil Kitchin
- William "Bill" Kirkbride circa-1965
- Danny Leatherbarrow
- David Lowden
- Sydney "Syd" Lowdon (#1) circa-1962
- William "Bill" Lymer circa-1957
- Dean Marwood circa-1990s
- Bill McCall (to Parramatta circa-1961)
- Iain MacCorquodale
- Matthew "Matt" McLeod
- John 'Spanky' McFarlane (#13) circa-1965
- 'Big' Jim Mills
- Mark Mulligan, 1992–95, genius fullback from Australia
- Gary Nixon (Prop forward) circa-1990
- John "Loppylugs"/"Loppy" O'Neill (#3) circa-1958...62
- Martin Oglanby, winner of Division Two Player of the Year in 1994
- James Pickering circa-1990s
- Piet Pretorius (#5) circa-1962
- Garry Purdham, who died in the 2010 Cumbria Shootings
- Geoff Rea 1983–1989
- Gus Risman (Father of John Risman)
- Sol Roper (#7) circa-1957...62 (1958 Challenge Cup Captain)
- Anthony Samuel circa-1990s
- Gary Smith (Testimonial match 1994)
- Tony Smith 1996. Smith went on to coach Leeds Rhinos, Great Britain, England and Warrington Wolves.
- William "Billy" Smith (#7) circa-1965
- Bill Telford (#12) circa-1948
- Cecil "Cec" Thompson (#11/#12/#13)
- Arnold 'Boxer' Walker
- Ian Wright

== Coaches ==
Also see Category:Workington Town coaches.

- Gus Risman 1946–54
- Jim Brough 1955–58
- Ike Southward 1968
- Eppie Gibson 1971–73
- Paul Charlton 1975–?
- Tommy Bishop 1980–81
- Paul Charlton 1982
- Harry Archer 1983–84
- Billy Smith 1984–85
- Keith Davies 1986–87
- Maurice Bamford 1988
- Phil Kitchin 1989
- Ray Ashton
- Dean Williams
- Peter Walsh 1992–95
- Kurt Sorensen 1995–96
- Ross O'Reilly 1996–97
- Robbie Tew 1997
- Andy Platt 1999
- Gary Murdock 2000-02
- Martin Wood 2003
- Billy McGinty 2003
- Ged Stokes 2003–07
- Craig Barker and Les Ashe 2007
- Dave Rotheram 2007–09
- Gary Charlton and
  Martin Oglanby 2009–2013
- Gary Charlton 2014
- Phil Veivers 2014
- Leon Pryce 2018–2019
- Chris Thorman 2019-2022
- Anthony Murray 2023–2024
- Jonty Gorley 2024–present

== Seasons ==
=== Super League era ===
Season	League									Play-offs	Challenge Cup	Other competitions		Name	Tries	Name	Points
Season	Division	P	W	D	L	F	A	Pts	Pos	Play-offs	Challenge Cup	Other competitions		Top try scorer		Top point scorer	
1996	Super League	22	2	1	19	325	1021	5	12th		R4						
1997	Division One	20	4	0	16	320	555	8	11th		R4						
1998	Division Two	20	3	2	15	293	558	8	7th		R4						
1999	Northern Ford Premiership	28	9	1	18	468	813	19	14th		R4						
2000	Northern Ford Premiership	28	11	1	16	502	776	23	12th		R4						
2001	Northern Ford Premiership	28	16	0	12	681	568	32	9th		R4						
2002	Northern Ford Premiership	27	13	0	14	677	677	26	11th		R5						
2003	National League Two	18	4	1	13	393	558	9	8th		R3						
2004	National League Two	18	10	0	8	597	479	20	5th		R4						
2005	National League Two	18	12	1	5	487	426	25	3rd	Lost in Preliminary Final	R4						
2006	National League Two	22	10	0	12	558	645	20	8th		R3						
2007	National League Two	22	12	0	10	655	515	43	5th		R4						
2008	National League Two	22	6	0	16	512	628	28	8th		R4						
2009	Championship 1	18	2	0	16	281	700	11	9th		R3						
2010	Championship 1	20	8	1	11	494	498	33	7th	Lost in Elimination Playoffs	R3						
2011	Championship 1	20	11	1	8	659	443	41	3rd	?	R3						
2012	Championship 1	18	12	0	5	617	330	43	3rd	Lost in Preliminary Final	R3						
2013	Championship	26	11	0	15	483	681	39	8th	Lost in Elimination Playoffs	R5						
2014	Championship	26	12	1	13	467	524	48	7th	?	R4						
2015	Championship	23	7	1	15	379	671	15	8th	Lost in Shield Semi Final	R4						
2015	Championship Shield	30	11	1	18	587	782	23	4th	Lost in Shield Semi Final	R4						
2016	Championship	23	5	1	17	455	756	11	11th		R4						
2016	Championship Shield	30	7	1	22	541	919	15	8th		R4						
2017	League 1	22	9	1	12	532	621	19	8th		R3						
2018	League 1	26	17	0	9	833	517	34	4th	Lost in Promotion and Playoff Finals	R4						
2019	League 1	20	10	1	9	592	478	21	5th	Lost in Semi Final	R5	1895 Cup	R2				
2020	League 1	League abandoned due to the COVID-19 pandemic									R5						
2021	League 1	15	10	1	4	471	310	21	2nd	Won in Promotion Final	Did not participate						
2022	Championship	27	1	0	26	296	1139	2	14th		R5						
2023	League 1	18	11	0	7	516	385	22	5th	Lost in Elimination Playoffs	R5						
2024	League One	20	9	0	11	504	549	18	6th	Lost in Elimination Playoffs	R3	1895 Cup	GS				
2025	League One	18	13	1	4	502	270	27	2nd (Note: Promotion due to the merger of League One and the Championship)	Play-offs cancelled	R3	1895 Cup	PR				
2026	Championship	24	5	1	18	472	735	11	18th		R3	1895 Cup	PR				

== Honours ==
- Rugby Football League Championship: 1
  - 1950–51
- Challenge Cup: 1
  - 1951–52
- Lancashire Cup: 1
  - 1977–78
- Western Division Championship: 1
  - 1962–63
