= Cumbria rugby league team =

English representative rugby league team

Team information
- Governing body: Rugby Football League
- Head coach: Paul Crarey
- Captain: Rob Purdham
- Home stadium: Varies

Uniforms
First colours

Team results
- First game
- Cumberland (Cumbria) 0–8 Yorkshire (Parkside, Hunslet; 5 February 1898)
- First international
- Cumberland (Cumbria) 21–9 New Zealand (Lonsdale Park, Workington; 8 January 1908)
- Biggest win
- Cumbria 70–0 United States (Craven Park, Barrow-in-Furness; 4 November 2007)
- Biggest defeat
- Cumbria 12–64 Anzacs (Derwent Park, Workington; 27 October 2004)

The Cumbria rugby league team (known as Cumberland from 1898 to 1973) is an English representative rugby league team consisting of players who were born in the county of Cumbria and the historic county of Cumberland. They play fixtures against international representative sides, often acting as opposition in warm-up fixtures for touring international sides.

== History ==
Cumbria played the touring Australian Kangaroos during 14 Kangaroo Tours, including 1908-09 (twice), 1911-12, 1921-22, 1929–30, 1933–34, 1948–49, 1963-64, 1967-68, 1973, 1978, 1982, 1986, 1990 and 1994, as well as playing the Australians as part of their 1992 Rugby League World Cup final tour. They also played New Zealand in 1907–08, 1926–27 and 1980.

During the 2004 Tri-Nations series Cumbria played a match against an 'ANZAC Combination' side made up of Australian and New Zealand squad members. The 64–12 loss was the largest ever suffered by the Cumbrian side.

Cumbria played the England national rugby league team as part of England's preparation for the 2010 Four Nations. The match raised funds for the Rugby Football League's benevolent fund and the family of Garry Purdham, who was among the victims of the Cumbria shootings tragedy on 2 June 2010. The game was watched by 5,250 spectators at Whitehaven's Recreation Ground and ended 18–18, raising over £50,000 for its cause.

In 2006, Cumbria defeated Tonga 28–16 at Derwent Park in Workington, while on 4 November 2007, Cumbria recorded its largest ever win when they defeated the United States 70–0 at Craven Park in Barrow-in-Furness.

In 2010, Cumbria was coached by Paul Crarey, with assistant coaches; Gary Charlton of Workington Town, and David Seeds of Whitehaven.

In November 2025, Cumbria will host Nigeria's first match outside of Africa.

== Current squad ==
Extended squad name for the friendly against Nigeria on 2 November 2025:

Player	Club
Max Anderson-Moore	(Cumbria) Whitehaven
Ellis Archer	(Cumbria) Workington Town
Ethan Bickerdike	(Cumbria) Whitehaven
Josh Blinkhorn	(Cumbria) Whitehaven
Luke Broadbent	(Cumbria) Barrow Raiders
Andrew Bulman	(Cumbria) Barrow Raiders
Jordan Burns	(Cumbria) Whitehaven
Jake Carter	(Cumbria) Workington Town
Luke Cresswell	(Cumbria) Whitehaven
Jamie Doran	(Cumbria) Workington Town
James Duffy	(Lancashire) Warrington Wolves
Zack Gardner	(Lancashire) Warrington Wolves
Ellis Gillam	(Haute-Garonne) Toulouse Olympique
Noah High	(Yorkshire) Wakefield Trinity
Harvie Hill	(Lancashire) Wigan Warriors
Ellison Holgate	(Cumbria) Whitehaven
Connor Holliday	(Cumbria) Whitehaven
Jordan Johnstone	(Lancashire) Widnes Vikings
Tom McKinney	(Lancashire) Warrington Wolves
Finn McMillan	(Cumbria) Barrow Raiders
Jake Pearce	(Cumbria) Whitehaven
Stevie Scholey	(Cumbria) Workington Town
Brad Singleton	(Yorkshire) Castleford Tigers
Jack Stephenson	(Cumbria) Workington Town
Curtis Teare	(Cumbria) Barrow Raiders
Jordan Thompson	(Cumbria) Whitehaven
Shane Toal	(Cumbria) Barrow Raiders
Tom Walker	(Cumbria) Barrow Raiders
Brad Walker	(Cumbria) Barrow Raiders
Cole Walker-Taylor	(Cumbria) Workington Town

== Results ==
Cumbria played in the County Championship from 1898 to its final season in 1983. They have also played against international representative sides during tours to Great Britain.

=== County Championship results ===
Titles 16: 1905–1906, 1907–1908, 1909–1910, 1911–1912, 1927–1928, 1932–1933, 1933–1934, 1934–1935, 1948–1949, 1959–1960, 1961–1962, 1963–1964, 1965–1966, 1966–1967, 1980–1981, 1981–1982.

=== International results ===
Results for Cumbria against international teams.

Date	Opposition	Result	Venue	Attendance	Tour
8 January 1908	New Zealand	21–9	Lonsdale Park, Workington	4,000	1907–08 All Golds tour
24 October 1908	Australia	10–52	Recreation Ground, Whitehaven	4,000	1908–09 Kangaroo tour
4 February 1909	Australia	11–2	Devonshire Park, Carlisle	2,000	1908–09 Kangaroo tour
22 November 1911	(Australia) (New Zealand) Australasia	2–5	Athletic Ground, Maryport	6,000	1911–12 Kangaroo tour
7 January 1922	(Australia) (New Zealand) Australasia	12–25	Lonsdale Park, Workington	5,000	1921–22 Kangaroo tour
6 January 1927	New Zealand	3–18	Unknown	4,200	1926–27 Kiwis tour
7 December 1929	Australia	8–5	Lonsdale Park, Workington	3,500	1929–30 Kangaroo tour
9 December 1933	Australia	17–16	Recreation Ground, Whitehaven	5,800	1933–34 Kangaroo tour
14 October 1939	New Zealand	C–C	Recreation Ground, Whitehaven	N/A	1939 Kiwis tour
14 October 1948	Australia	5–4	Recreation Ground, Whitehaven	8,818	1948–49 Kangaroo tour
7 December 1955	New Zealand	24–11	Odsal Stadium, Bradford	3,643	1955 Kiwis tour
20 September 1961	New Zealand	22–20	Station Road, Swinton	5,271	1961 Kiwis tour
9 October 1961	New Zealand	9–10	Recreation Ground, Whitehaven	5,033	1961 Kiwis tour
31 October 1963	Australia	0–21	Derwent Park, Workington	8,229	1963–64 Kangaroo tour
18 November 1967	Australia	17–15	Derwent Park, Workington	7,545	1967–68 Kangaroo tour
24 October 1973	Australia	2–28	Recreation Ground, Whitehaven	3,666	1973 Kangaroo tour
1 October 1978	Australia	4–47	Craven Park, Barrow-in-Furness	5,964	1978 Kangaroo tour
7 November 1979	Papua New Guinea	9–23	Craven Park, Barrow-in-Furness	2,000	1979 Kumuls tour
8 October 1980	New Zealand	9–3	Recreation Ground, Whitehaven	4,070	1980 Kiwis tour
9 November 1982	Australia	2–41	Brunton Park, Carlisle	5,748	1982 Kangaroo tour
2 November 1983	Māori	6–40	Recreation Ground, Whitehaven	2,600	1982 Kiwis tour
15 October 1985	New Zealand	6–32	Recreation Ground, Whitehaven	5,500	1985 Kiwis tour
21 October 1986	Australia	12–48	Craven Park, Barrow-in-Furness	4,233	1986 Kangaroo tour
20 October 1987	Papua New Guinea	22–4	Recreation Ground, Whitehaven	3,750	1987 Kumuls tour
17 October 1989	New Zealand	2–28	Recreation Ground, Whitehaven	3,983	1989 Kiwis tour
17 October 1990	Australia	10–42	Derwent Park, Workington	6,750	1990 Kangaroo tour
5 November 1991	Papua New Guinea	35–5	Derwent Park, Workington	2,000	1991 Kumuls tour
18 October 1992	Australia	0–44	Derwent Park, Workington	5,156	1992 Kangaroo tour
2 October 1994	Australia	8–52	Derwent Park, Workington	4,277	1994 Kangaroo tour
19 October 2003	New Zealand Residents	24–24	Recreation Ground, Whitehaven	4,124	Friendly
27 October 2004	(Australia) (New Zealand) Anzacs	12–64	Derwent Park, Workington	4,203	Friendly
25 October 2006	Tonga	28–16	Derwent Park, Workington	1,639	Friendly
4 November 2007	United States	70–0	Craven Park, Barrow-in-Furness	1,028	Friendly
3 October 2010	England	18–18	Recreation Ground, Whitehaven	5,250	Friendly
22 October 2011	England Knights	12–26	Recreation Ground, Whitehaven	1,163	Friendly
21 October 2016	Scotland	16–48	Craven Park, Barrow-in-Furness	1,048	Friendly
7 October 2022	Jamaica	28–12	Derwent Park, Workington	3,000	Friendly
13 October 2023	Wales Chairman's XIII	23–4	Recreation Ground, Whitehaven	Unknown	Friendly
2 November 2025	Nigeria	70–6	Craven Park, Barrow-in-Furness	1,475	Friendly
