= Merv Hicks =

Welsh rugby union footballer, GB rugby league footballer and coach

Personal information
- Full name: Mervyn John Hicks
- Born: 15 December 1943 (age 82) Crosskeys, Monmouthshire, Wales
- Height: 6 ft 2 in (1.88 m)
- Weight: 17 st 0 lb (108 kg)

Playing information

Rugby union
Club
Years	Team	Pld	T	G	FG	P
	Cross Keys RFC

Rugby league
- Position: Centre, Second-row, Prop
Club
Years	Team	Pld	T	G	FG	P
1961	Doncaster	3	0	4	0	8
1961–64	Warrington	28	5	39	0	93
1964–66	St Helens	67	13	2	0	43
1966–70	Canterbury-Bankstown	84	16	0	1	50
1971–72	North Sydney Bears	19	1	0	0	3
1972–74	Hull FC	18	4	0	0	12
1974	Leeds	11	4	0	0	12
1975	Bradford Northern	2	1	0	0	3
	Total	232	44	45	1	224
Representative
Years	Team	Pld	T	G	FG	P
1965	Great Britain Under-24	1	0	4	0	8
1965	Great Britain	1	0	0	0	0
1965	Commonwealth XIII	1	0	0	0	0

Coaching information
Club
Years	Team	Gms	W	D	L	W%
1971–72	North Sydney	44	12	2	30	27
- As of 4 July 2022

Mervyn "Merv" John Hicks (born 1943) is a Welsh former rugby union, and professional rugby league footballer who played in the 1960s and 1970s. He played rugby union club football in Wales for the Cross Keys RFC, rugby league club football in Britain for Doncaster, Warrington, St Helens, Hull FC, Leeds and Bradford Northern, and in Australia for the Canterbury Bulldogs and the North Sydney Bears. Hicks was also selected to play representative football for Great Britain.

== Background ==
Hicks was born in Crosskeys, Monmouthshire, Wales.

== Early career ==
After representing Wales Youth Rugby Union as number 8 and captain in 1960 (in the same team as David Watkins), he was 'lured north' to play rugby league for Doncaster (3 appearances 1961) for the sum of £1000, enough to buy several houses in his home village at that time. At 6'2" and 17 stone, his dynamic skills, aggressive defence and size caught the eye of Warrington (28 appearances 1961–64), who paid Doncaster £6000 just a few months later to sign him. He made his début for Warrington on Saturday 21 October 1961, Warrington converted him from a centre to a hard running ball distributor playing as a second-row or prop. He played his last match for Warrington on Saturday 8 February 1964.

He joined St. Helens (67 appearances 1964-1966), where he featured in starring in a prominent forward pack alongside notable players such as Ray French, Cliff Watson, and fellow Welshmen Kel Coslett, John Warlow and John Mantle. He also won selection for Commonwealth XIII and full caps for Great Britain.

Merv Hicks represented the Commonwealth XIII rugby league team while at St. Helens in 1965 against New Zealand at Crystal Palace National Recreation Centre, London on Wednesday 18 August 1965,

=== County Cup Final appearances ===
Merv Hicks played at second-row and scored a try in St. Helens' 12-4 victory over Swinton in the 1964 Lancashire Cup Final during the 1964–65 season at Central Park, Wigan on Saturday 24 October 1964.

=== BBC2 Floodlit Trophy Final appearances ===
Merv Hicks played at second-row in St. Helens' 0-4 defeat by Castleford in the 1965 BBC2 Floodlit Trophy Final during the 1965–66 season at Knowsley Road, St. Helens on Tuesday 14 December 1965.

=== Representative honours ===
On 3 April 1965, Hicks played in the first ever Great Britain under-24 international match in a 17–9 win against France under-24's.

== New life and career in Australia ==
The offer to start a new life with the Canterbury Bankstown Berries in the Sydney Rugby League competition led Hicks to Australia with his wife, Gwyneira, and Andrew, in 1966. Two daughters, Julie and Tanya, followed in 1967 and 1970.

Five highly successful seasons with the Berries (84 appearances) including a grand final in 1967 ended with his move to the North Sydney Bears (19 appearances) as captain-coach for the 1971 and 1972 seasons. Although these were lean times for the Bears and an injury stricken Hicks, they managed to beat all of the finalists of those years when Hicks was on the field, as well as creating many headlines with the hard-hitting antics of the captain and his fellow Welsh import, 'Big' Jim Mills. His 7 seasons in the Sydney competition were highlighted by an ultimately unsuccessful newspaper campaign to have the international representation rules changed so that he could be picked for New South Wales and Australia, such was his dominance at club level.

A short season with the Orange CYMS (16 appearances) in country NSW had sufficient impact on the district that he was nominated for the club's "Team of the Century", prior to the Hicks family's return to the north of England.

== Later career ==
Hicks returned to the north of England for four seasons to finish off his first class career with Hull FC (18 appearances), Leeds (11 appearances) and Bradford Northern (2 appearances). Having played in an era when Wales was not represented on the international stage during his first stint in British rugby league, his selection for Wales for the 1975 Rugby League World Cup was cruelly denied by a broken arm suffered in a club game just weeks before the tournament kicked off. Nineteen seasons of professional rugby league ended for Hicks with three years at the Bowral Blues (40 appearances) in Group 6 of the New South Wales country rugby league.

== Coaching career ==
After retiring from playing, he coached several teams including Bowral, Group 6, Southern Division, Junee and Riverina in the country championships.

Hicks now lives with his wife Gwyneira, on the Central Coast of New South Wales and works in the hotel industry.

Sporting positions
Preceded by Roy Francis; 1969–1970	Coach North Sydney; 1971–1972	Succeeded by Noel Kelly; 1973–1976
