= 1965–66 BBC2 Floodlit Trophy =

- Structure: Floodlit knockout championship
- Teams: 8
- Winners: Castleford
- Runners-up: St. Helens

The 1965–66 BBC2 Floodlit Trophy was the inaugural season of the BBC2 Floodlit Trophy competition. Castleford won the trophy by beating St. Helens with a score of 4–0. The match was played at Knowsley Road, Eccleston, St Helens, Merseyside. The attendance was 11,510 and receipts were £3,548. This was to be the first of Castleford's three victories in successive seasons in the first three Floodlit competitions.

== Background ==
This season there were only eight teams entering, all by invite, playing eleven matches for which the BBC paid the RFL a grand total of £9,000.00. The entrants included the seven clubs with permanent floodlights: Castleford, Leigh, Oldham, St Helens, Swinton, Warrington and Widnes together with Leeds, who installed floodlights in September 1966. The competition was played in the form of a mini-league with the semi-finals and final stages being on a knock out basis.

== Competition and results ==
=== Qualifying rounds ===
Each team played two matches in the qualifying round. All teams played one home game each except Leeds, who played both games away from home as their floodlights still needed to be installed.

The four teams with the best points difference qualified for the semi-finals.

==== Round 1 ====
Game No	Fixture Date	Home team	Score	Away team	Venue	Att	Rec	Notes	Ref
1	Tue 6 Oct 1965	St. Helens	25–19	Leigh	Knowsley Road	13000			
2	Tue 12 Oct 1965	Warrington	10–20	Widnes	Wilderspool				
3	Tue 19 Oct 1965	Swinton	21–5	Oldham	Station Road				
4	Tue 26 Oct 1965	Castleford	7–7	Leeds	Wheldon Road				

==== Round 2 ====
Game No	Fixture Date	Home team	Score	Away team	Venue	Att	Rec	Notes	Ref
1	Tue 2 Nov 1965	Leigh	13–9	Warrington	Hilton Park				
2	Tue 9 Nov 1965	Widnes	19–8	Swinton	Naughton Park				
3	Tue 16 Nov 1965	St. Helens	21–9	Leeds	Knowsley Road	5600			
4	Tue 25 Nov 1965	Oldham	4–6	Castleford	Watersheddings				

==== Table ====
Pos	Club	P	W	D	L	PF	PA	Pts	PD
1	Widnes	2	2	0	0	39	18	4	21
2	St. Helens	2	2	0	0	46	28	4	18
3	Swinton	2	1	0	1	29	24	2	5
4	Castleford	2	1	1	0	13	11	3	2
5	Leigh	2	1	0	1	32	34	2	-2
6	Leeds	2	0	1	1	16	28	1	-12
7	Warrington	2	0	0	2	19	33	0	-14
8	Oldham	2	0	0	2	9	27	0	-18

Pos = Finishing position P = Games played W = Wins D = Draw L = Lose
PF = Points scored PA = Points against Pts = League points PD = Points scored difference

=== Semi-finals ===
Game No	Fixture Date	Home team	Score	Away team	Venue	Att	Rec	Notes	Ref
1	Tue 30 Nov 1965	Widnes	9–12	Castleford	Naughton Park				
2	Tue 7 Dec 1965	St. Helens	9–5	Swinton	Knowsley Road	9000			

=== Final ===
Game No	Fixture Date	Home team	Score	Away team	Venue	Att	Rec	Notes	Ref
	Tuesday 14 December 1965	St. Helens	0–4	Castleford	Knowsley Road	11,510	£3,548	1	

==== Teams and scorers ====
Castleford	№	St. Helens
	teams	
Derek Edwards	1	Frank Barrow
Colin Battye	2	Tom van Vollenhoven
Malcolm Battye	3	David Wood
Ron Willett	4	Billy Benyon
Trevor Briggs	5	Len Killeen
Alan "Chuck" Hardisty	6	Alex Murphy
Roger Millward	7	Bob Prosser
Abe Terry	8	Ray French
John Ward	9	Robert "Bob" Dagnall
Clive Dickinson	10	Cliff Watson
Wiliam "Bill" Bryant	11	Merv Hicks
John Taylor	12	John Mantle
Peter Small	13	Doug Laughton
Trevor Bedford (unused?)	14	
John Walker (unused?)	15	
George Clinton	Coach	Joe Coen
4	score	0
2	HT	0
	Scorers	
	Goals	
Ron Willett (2)	G	
Referee		Laurie Gant (Wakefield)

Scoring - Try = three (3) points - Goal = two (2) points - Drop goal = two (2) points

=== The play-offs ===
Semi-Finals
2	St. Helens	9
3	Swinton	5
1	Widnes	9
4	Castleford	12

Final
St. Helens	0
Castleford	4

== See also ==
- 1965–66 Northern Rugby Football League season
- 1965 Lancashire Cup
- 1965 Yorkshire Cup
- BBC2 Floodlit Trophy
- Rugby league county cups
