= Peter Small =

Former GB international rugby league footballer

Personal information
- Full name: Peter Eltringham Small
- Born: 13 February 1939 (age 86) Pontefract, Yorkshire England

Playing information

Rugby union
Club
Years	Team	Pld	T	G	FG	P
	Castleford RUFC

Rugby league
- Position: Wing, Second-row, Centre
Club
Years	Team	Pld	T	G	FG	P
1958–69	Castleford	315	109	0	0	327
	Hull Kingston Rovers	43	3	0	0	9
≤1972–≥73	Bradford Northern
	Total	358	112	0	0	336
Representative
Years	Team	Pld	T	G	FG	P
1967	Yorkshire	1	0	0	0	0
1962	Great Britain	4	3	0	0	9

Peter Eltringham Small (born 13 February 1939) is an English former rugby union and professional rugby league footballer who played in the 1950s, 1960s and 1970s. He played club level rugby union (RU) for Castleford RUFC, and representative level rugby league (RL) for Great Britain and Yorkshire, and at club level for Allerton Bywater ARLFC, Castleford, Hull Kingston Rovers and Bradford Northern, as a wing, and later as a second-row.

== Background ==
Peter Small's birth was registered in Pontefract district, West Riding of Yorkshire, England, and he was a pupil at Airedale High School.

== Playing career ==
=== International honours ===
Peter Small won a cap playing left wing and scored a try for Great Britain while at Castleford in the 8–27 defeat by New Zealand at Carlaw Park, Auckland on Saturday 11 August 1962.

=== County honours ===
Peter Small won a cap for Yorkshire while at Castleford playing left-second-row in the 15–14 victory over Australia at Belle Vue, Wakefield on Wednesday 4 October 1967.

=== County League appearances ===
Peter Small played in Castleford's victory in the Yorkshire League during the 1964–65 season.

=== County Cup Final appearances ===
Peter Small played left-second-row in Castleford's 11–22 defeat by Leeds in the 1968 Yorkshire Cup Final during the 1968–69 season at Belle Vue, Wakefield on Saturday 19 October 1968.

=== BBC2 Floodlit Trophy Final appearances ===
Peter Small played loose forward in Castleford's 4–0 victory over St. Helens in the 1965 BBC2 Floodlit Trophy Final during the 1965–66 season at Knowsley Road, St. Helens on Tuesday 14 December 1965, and played right-second-row in the 7–2 victory over Swinton in the 1966 BBC2 Floodlit Trophy Final during the 1966–67 season at Wheldon Road, Castleford on Tuesday 20 December 1966.

== Honoured at Castleford ==
Peter Small is a Castleford Tigers Hall of Fame Inductee.
