= Bill Bryant (rugby league) =

GB international rugby league footballer (1940–2019)

Personal information
- Full name: William Bryant
- Born: 22 December 1940; Lower Agbrigg, Wakefield, England
- Died: 9 June 2019 (aged 78)

Playing information
- Height: 6 ft 2 in (1.88 m)
- Weight: 18 st 0 lb (114 kg)
- Position: Second-row
Club
Years	Team	Pld	T	G	FG	P
1957–1970	Castleford	253	75	0	0	225
Representative
Years	Team	Pld	T	G	FG	P
1964–67	Yorkshire	6	0	0	0	0
1964–67	Great Britain	5	0	0	0	0

William Bryant (22 December 1940 – 9 June 2019), known as "Big Bill", was an English professional rugby league footballer who played in the 1950s, 1960s and 1970s. He played at representative level for Great Britain and Yorkshire, and at club level for Castleford, as a second-row.

== Background ==
Bill Bryant's birth was registered in Lower Agbrigg district, Wakefield, West Riding of Yorkshire, he was the landlord of The Castlefields (The Honky Tonk) public house, Vickers Street, Castleford, he also owned a bar in Tenerife.

== Playing career ==
=== International honours ===
Bill Bryant won caps for Great Britain while at Castleford in 1964 against France (2 matches), in 1966 against Australia (2 matches), and in 1967 against France.

=== County honours ===
Bill Bryant won caps playing at second-row for Yorkshire while at Castleford in the 14–6 victory over Cumberland at Whitehaven's stadium on 9 September 1964, the 3–19 defeat by Cumberland at Hull Kingston Rovers' stadium on 8 September 1965, the 15–9 victory over New Zealand at Castleford's stadium on 20 September 1965, the 16–13 victory over Lancashire at Swinton's stadium on 10 November 65, the 17–22 defeat by Lancashire at Leeds' stadium on 21 September 1966, and the 34–23 victory over Cumberland at Castleford's stadium on 25 October 1967.

=== County League appearances ===
Bill Bryant played in Castleford's victory in the Yorkshire League during the 1964–65 season.

=== BBC2 Floodlit Trophy Final appearances ===
Bill Bryant played at second-row in Castleford's 4–0 victory over St. Helens in the 1965 BBC2 Floodlit Trophy Final during the 1965–66 season at Knowsley Road, St. Helens on Tuesday 14 December 1965, played at second-row in the 7–2 victory over Swinton in the 1966 BBC2 Floodlit Trophy Final during the 1966–67 season at Wheldon Road, Castleford on Tuesday 20 December 1966, and played at second-row in the 8–5 victory over Leigh in the 1967 BBC2 Floodlit Trophy Final during the 1967–68 season at Headingley, Leeds on Saturday 16 January 1968.

=== Club career ===
Bill Bryant sustained a broken-leg prior to the 1968–69 Challenge Cup Final, and consequently he did not play in the final, he never fully recovered from this injury, and he retired from playing rugby league in 1970.

== Death ==
Bryant died on 9 June 2019, at the age of 78.

== Honoured at Castleford Tigers ==
Bill Bryant is a Tigers Hall of Fame Inductee.

== Genealogical information ==
Bill Bryant's marriage to May (née Rollinson) was registered during first 1/4 1960 in Pontefract district. They had children; Mark A. Bryant (registered during second 1/4 1962 (age 62–63) in Pontefract district). Bill Bryant was the younger brother of the rugby league footballer who played in the 1950s and 1960s for Castleford and Bramley, Edward Bryant/Eddie Bryant (birth registered third 1/4 1938 in Wakefield district).
