= Malcolm Battye =

English rugby league footballer

Personal information
- Born: third 1/4 1941 (age 84–85) Pontefract district, England

Playing information
- Position: Centre
Club
Years	Team	Pld	T	G	FG	P
1961–67	Castleford	52	8	0	0	24
1967–73	Doncaster	123	18	0	0	54
	Total	175	26	0	0	78
- Relatives: Colin Battye (brother)

Malcolm Battye (birth registered third 1/4 1941) is an English former professional rugby league footballer who played in the 1960s. He played at club level for Castleford and Doncaster, as a centre.

== Background ==
Malcolm Battye's birth was registered in Pontefract district, West Riding of Yorkshire, England.

== Playing career ==
=== County League appearances ===
Malcolm Battye played in Castleford's victory in the Yorkshire League during the 1964–65 season.

=== BBC2 Floodlit Trophy Final appearances ===
Malcolm Battye played at centre in Castleford's 4-0 victory over St. Helens in the 1965 BBC2 Floodlit Trophy Final during the 1965–66 season at Knowsley Road, St. Helens on Tuesday 14 December 1965.

== Genealogical information ==
Malcolm Battye is the younger brother of Derek Battye, Barbara Battye, and the rugby league footballer; Colin Battye.
