= Anthony Barrow =

Anthony or Tony Barrow may refer to:

- Tony Barrow (rugby league, born 1944) of St Helens R.F.C.
- Tony Barrow (rugby league, born 1971) of Swinton Lions
- Tony Barrow (1936–2016), English press officer, worked with the Beatles
- Sir Anthony Barrow, 7th Baronet (born 1962), of the Barrow baronets
