= Ron Willett =

English rugby league footballer

Personal information
- Born: 12 Nov 1944 (age 80–81); Pontefract district, England

Playing information
- Position: Wing, Centre
Club
Years	Team	Pld	T	G	FG	P
1964–69	Castleford	128	37	284	0	679
1969–??	Hull Kingston Rovers	12	1	10	0	23
	Total	140	38	294	0	702

Ron Willett (birth registered fourth 1/4 1944) is an English former professional rugby league footballer who played in the 1960s. He played at club level for Castleford, as a goal-kicking wing, or centre.

== Background ==
Ron Willett's birth was registered in Pontefract district, West Riding of Yorkshire, England.

== Playing career ==
=== County League appearances ===
Ron Willett played in Castleford's victory in the Yorkshire League during the 1964–65 season.

=== BBC2 Floodlit Trophy Final appearances ===
Ron Willett played at centre and scored two goals in Castleford's 4-0 victory over St. Helens in the 1965 BBC2 Floodlit Trophy Final during the 1965–66 season at Knowsley Road, St. Helens on Tuesday 14 December 1965, played at centre and scored a goal in the 7-2 victory over Swinton in the 1966 BBC2 Floodlit Trophy Final during the 1966–67 season at Wheldon Road, Castleford on Tuesday 20 December 1966, and played on the wing and scored four goals in the 8-5 victory over Leigh in the 1967 BBC2 Floodlit Trophy Final during the 1967–68 season at Headingley, Leeds on Saturday 16 January 1968. The record for the most goals in a BBC2 Floodlit Trophy Final is four goals, and is jointly held by; Ron Willett, Kel Coslett and Dave Hall.
