= Colin Battye =

English rugby league footballer (1936–2018)

Personal information
- Born: c. 1936 Pontefract district, England
- Died: 2018 (aged 82)

Playing information
- Position: Wing
Club
Years	Team	Pld	T	G	FG	P
1958–66	Castleford	174	75	0	0	225
- Relatives: Malcolm Battye (brother)

Colin Battye (c. 1936 – 2018) was an English professional rugby league footballer who played in the 1950s and 1960s. He played at club level for Castleford, as a wing.

== Background ==
Colin Battye's birth was registered in Pontefract district, West Riding of Yorkshire in 1936, and he died aged 82 in April 2018.

== Playing career ==
=== County League appearances ===
Colin Battye played in Castleford's victory in the Yorkshire county league during the 1964–65 season.

=== BBC2 Floodlit Trophy Final appearances ===
Colin Battye played on the wing in Castleford's 4-0 victory over St. Helens in the 1965 BBC2 Floodlit Trophy Final during the 1965–66 season at Knowsley Road, St. Helens on Tuesday 14 December 1965.

== Genealogical information ==
Colin Battye was the younger brother of Derek Battye, and Barbara Battye, and the older brother of the rugby league footballer; Malcolm Battye.
