= Bottom 14 Championship =

The Bottom 14 Championship was a rugby league knockout competition held by the Rugby Football League in the 1964–65 season. The competition was used by RFL secretary Bill Fallowfield to trial an experimental rule change where the play-the-ball was replaced with an alternative method of releasing the ball similar to rugby union. The tournament lasted only one season, and was won by Huddersfield.

== Background ==
In February 1965, the Rugby Football League (RFL) announced that a competition would be staged at the end of the 1964–65 season for the bottom 14 clubs, and would be used to trial an alternative method of playing the ball. The experiment was one of several attempts by the RFL to find a solution to discourage negative tactics being used by teams to keep possession of the ball.

Although some clubs declined to take part, the competition went ahead as planned. The final was contested by Doncaster and Huddersfield at Tattersfield, with Huddersfield winning 13–3 in front of a crowd of 2,450.

The competition was not held again after the 1964–65 season, and the rule change was ultimately rejected at the RFL's annual general meeting.

== Results ==
=== First round ===
Bramley, Dewsbury, Liverpool City and Salford all withdrew from the competition, leaving their opponents with byes to the next round.

Date	Home team	Score	Away team
28 April 1965	Batley	9–8	York
28 April 1965	Huddersfield	36–10	Rochdale Hornets
28 April 1965	Widnes	15–9	Bradford Northern
28 April 1965	Blackpool Borough	w/o	Bramley
28 April 1965	Doncaster	w/o	Dewsbury
28 April 1965	Keighley	w/o	Liverpool City
28 April 1965	Whitehaven	w/o	Salford

=== Second round ===
Whitehaven received a bye into the next round.

Date	Home team	Score	Away team
4 May 1965	Doncaster	24–9	Batley
5 May 1965	Huddersfield	15–12	Widnes
5 May 1965	Keighley	3–24	Blackpool Borough

=== Semi-final ===
Date	Home team	Score	Away team
11 May 1965	Doncaster	22–9	Blackpool Borough
12 May 1965	Huddersfield	48–0	Whitehaven

=== Final ===
18 May 1965

Doncaster	3 – 13	Huddersfield
Tries: Roberts		Tries: Hagan, Senior, Valentine; Goals: Curry (2)

Tattersfield, Doncaster
Attendance: 2,450
Referee: S. Shepherd (Oldham)
