= 1967–68 Lancashire Cup =

- Structure: Regional knockout championship
- Teams: 14
- Winners: St. Helens
- Runners-up: Warrington

1967–68 was the fifty-fifth occasion on which the Lancashire Cup completion had been held.
In the final, held on Saturday 7 October at Central Park, Wigan, (historically in the county of Lancashire), St. Helens drew 2–2 with Warrington. At half-time Warrington were leading St Helens by 2–0.
The attendance at this match was 16,897, receipts were £3,886, and the half time score 0–2.

In the replay held eight weeks later on 2 December, St. Helens won the trophy by beating Warrington by the score of 13–10.
The replay was held at Station Road, Pendlebury, Lancashire) and the halftime score was 3–3.
The attendance at the replay was only 7,577 and receipts were £2,485-0-0.
This was the first of two consecutive Lancashire Cup final wins for St. Helens, and what is more, the sixth of the seven occasions on which the club will win the trophy in the successive nine years.

== Background ==
The total number of teams entering the competition remained the same at 14.
The same fixture format was retained, and due to the number of clubs this resulted in no bye but one "blank" or "dummy" fixture in the first round, and one bye in the second round

== Competition and results ==
=== Round 1 ===
Involved 7 matches (with no bye but one "blank" fixture) and 14 clubs

Game No	Fixture date	Home team	Score	Away team	Venue	Att	Rec	Notes	Ref
1	Fri 18 Aug 1967	St. Helens	7-4	Rochdale Hornets	Knowsley Road	6,000			
2	Fri 18 Aug 1967	Widnes	9-12	Swinton	Naughton Park				
3	Sat 19 Aug 1967	Oldham	17-11	Leigh	Watersheddings				
4	Sat 19 Aug 1967	Warrington	17-10	Blackpool Borough	Wilderspool				
5	Sat 19 Aug 1967	Whitehaven	10-13	Liverpool City	Recreation Ground				
6	Sat 19 Aug 1967	Wigan	14-18	Salford	Central Park				
7	Sat 19 Aug 1967	Workington Town	35-6	Barrow	Derwent Park				
8		blank		blank					

=== Round 2 - Quarter-finals ===
Involved 3 matches (with one bye) and 7 clubs

Game No	Fixture date	Home team	Score	Away team	Venue	Att	Rec	Notes	Ref
1	Mon 04 Sep 1967	Workington Town	33-0	Salford	Derwent Park				
2	Wed 06 Sep 1967	Warrington	14-5	Liverpool City	Wilderspool				
3	Thu 07 Sep 1967	Swinton	11-8	Oldham	Station Road				
4		St. Helens		bye					

=== Round 3 – Semi-finals ===
Involved 2 matches and 4 clubs

Game No	Fixture date	Home team	Score	Away team	Venue	Att	Rec	Notes	Ref
1	Sat 16 Sep 1967	Workington Town	13-23	Warrington	Derwent Park				
2	Tue 19 Sep 1967	Swinton	8-12	St. Helens	Station Road	10,733			

=== Final ===
Game No	Fixture date	Home team	Score	Away team	Venue	Att	Rec	Notes	Ref
	Saturday 7 October 1967	St. Helens	2-2	Warrington	Central Park	16,897	£3,886	1	

=== Final – Replay ===
Game No	Fixture date	Home team	Score	Away team	Venue	Att	Rec	Notes	Ref
	Saturday 2 December 1967	St. Helens	13-10	Warrington	Station Road	7,577	£2485-0-0	2	

==== Teams and scorers ====
St. Helens	No.	Warrington
	teams	
Frank Barrow	1	Keith Affleck
Tom van Vollenhoven	2	John Coupe
Billy Benyon	3	Jackie Melling
Alan Whittle	4	Peter Harvey
Tony Barrow	5	Brian Glover
Peter Douglas	6	Willie Aspinall
Tommy Bishop	7	Parry Gordon
John Warlow	8	Keith Ashcroft
Bill Sayer	9	Dave Harrison
Cliff Watson	10	Brian Brady
Brian Hogan	11	Ken Parr
John Mantle	12	Barry Briggs
Kel Coslett	13	Ray Clarke
Peter Gartland	14	Joe Pickavance (for Peter Harvey)
Tony Karalius	15	?
2	score	2
0	HT	2
	Scorers	
	Goals	
Kel Coslett (1)	G	
	Drop Goals	
	DG	Willie Aspinall (1)
Referee		G. Fred Lindop (Wakefield)
Replay	Replay	Replay
Frank Barrow	1	Tommy Conroy
Tom van Vollenhoven	2	John Coupe
Wilf Smith	3	Jackie Melling
Billy Benyon	4	Bill Allen
Les Jones	5	Brian Glover
Peter Douglas	6	Tony Scahill
Tommy Bishop	7	Parry Gordon
John Warlow	8	Keith Ashcroft
Bill Sayer	9	Dave Harrison
Cliff Watson	10	Joe Price
Eric Chisnall	11	Barry Briggs
Kel Coslett	12	Ken Parr
John Houghton (for Peter Douglas)	13	Ray Clarke
	14	
	15	
Cliff Evans	Coach	Joe Egan
13	score	10
3	HT	3
	Scorers	
	Tries	
Les Jones (1)	T	Jackie Melling (1)
John Warlow (1)	T	Parry Gordon (1)
Eric Chisnall (1)	T	
	Goals	
John Houghton (2)	T	Bill Allen (2)
Referee		G. Fred Lindop (Wakefield)

- Try = three (3) points - Goal = two (2) points - Drop goal = two (2) points

=== The road to success ===
First round
Widnes	9
Swinton	12
Oldham	17
Leigh	11
St. Helens	7
Rochdale Hornets	4
blank
blank
Workington Town	35
Barrow	6
Wigan	14
Salford	18
Warrington	17
Blackpool Borough	10
Whitehaven	10
Liverpool City	13

Second round
Swinton	11
Oldham	8
St. Helens
bye
Workington Town	33
Salford	0
Warrington	14
Liverpool City	5

Semi-finals
Swinton	8
St. Helens	12
Workington Town	13
Warrington	23

Final
St. Helens	2-13
Warrington	2-10

== Notes and comments ==
1 * Central Park was the home ground of Wigan with a final capacity of 18,000, although the record attendance was 47,747 for Wigan v St Helens 27 March 1959
2 * Station Road was the home ground of Swinton from 1929 to 1992 and at its peak was one of the finest rugby league grounds in the country and it boasted a capacity of 60,000. The actual record attendance was for the Challenge Cup semi-final on 7 April 1951 when 44,621 watched Wigan beat Warrington 3-2

== See also ==
- 1967–68 Northern Rugby Football League season
- Rugby league county cups
