= George Clinton (rugby league) =

English RL coach and former rugby league footballer

Personal information
- Born: second quarter of 1924; Pontefract, England
- Died: 2010 (aged 85)

Playing information
Club
| Years | Team | Pld | T | G | FG | P |
|---|---|---|---|---|---|---|
| 1944–52 | Castleford | 103 | 25 | 4 | 0 | 83 |

Coaching information
Club
| Years | Team | Gms | W | D | L | W% |
| 1965–68 | Castleford | 154 | 101 | 7 | 46 | 66 |

George Clinton (second quarter of 1924 – 2010) was an English professional rugby league footballer who played in the 1940s and 1950s, and coached in the 1950s and 1960s. He played at club level for Castleford, and coached at club level for Castleford.

== Background ==
George Clinton's birth was registered in Pontefract district, West Riding of Yorkshire, England, he was a long-serving cricketer with Glasshoughton Cricket Club, after retiring as a player he represented the club as an umpire in the Pontefract Cricket League, and was a regular supporter of Glasshoughton's teams, he died aged 85, and his funeral took place at St. Joseph's Catholic Church, Castleford, at 10:45am on Monday 25 January 2010.

== Coaching career ==
=== BBC2 Floodlit Trophy Final appearances ===
George Clinton was the coach in Castleford's 4–0 victory over St. Helens in the 1965 BBC2 Floodlit Trophy Final during the 1965–66 season at Knowsley Road, St. Helens on Tuesday 14 December 1965, in the 7–2 victory over Swinton in the 1966 BBC2 Floodlit Trophy Final during the 1966–67 season at Wheldon Road, Castleford on Tuesday 20 December 1966, and in the 8–5 victory over Leigh in the 1967 BBC2 Floodlit Trophy Final during the 1967–68 season at Headingley, Leeds on Saturday 16 January 1968.

=== Club career ===
George Clinton was the coach of Castleford, his first game in charge was on Saturday 2 January 1965, and his last game in charge was on Wednesday 24 April 1968.
