= 1964–65 Lancashire Cup =

- Structure: Regional knockout championship
- Teams: 14
- Winners: St. Helens
- Runners-up: Swinton

1964–65 was the fifty-second occasion on which the Lancashire Cup completion had been held.

St. Helens won the trophy by beating Swinton by the score of 12-4

The match was played at Central Park, Wigan, (historically in the county of Lancashire). The attendance was 17,383 and receipts were £3,393

This was the fifth of five consecutive Lancashire Cup final wins for St. Helens, and what is more, the fifth of seven victories in a period of nine successive seasons.
It is also the fourth time in the last five years that Swinton have been defeated finalists.

== Background ==
With again no invitation to a junior club this season, the total number of teams entering the competition remained the same at 14.

The same fixture format was retained, and due to the number of clubs this resulted in no bye but one “blank” or “dummy” fixture in the first round, and one bye in the second round

== Competition and results ==
=== Round 1 ===
Involved 7 matches (with no bye but one “blank” fixture) and 14 clubs

| Game No | Fixture date | Home team | Score | Away team | Venue | Att | Rec | Notes | Ref |
|---|---|---|---|---|---|---|---|---|---|
| 1 | Friday 4 September 1964 | Whitehaven | 10-31 | Oldham | Recreation Ground | | | | |
| 2 | Saturday 5 September 1964 | Barrow | 10-5 | Blackpool Borough | Craven Park | | | | |
| 3 | Saturday 5 September 1964 | Leigh | 10-13 | Warrington | Hilton Park | | | | |
| 4 | Saturday 5 September 1964 | Liverpool City | 11-41 | St. Helens | Mill Yard, Knotty Ash | 3,500 | | | |
| 5 | Saturday 5 September 1964 | Widnes | 33-0 | Rochdale Hornets | Naughton Park | | | | |
| 6 | Saturday 5 September 1964 | Wigan | 36-6 | Salford | Central Park | | | | |
| 7 | Saturday 5 September 1964 | Workington Town | 2-6 | Swinton | Derwent Park | | | | |
| 8 | | blank | | blank | | | | | |

=== Round 2 - Quarter-finals ===
Involved 3 matches (with one bye) and 7 clubs

| Game No | Fixture date | Home team | Score | Away team | Venue | Att | Rec | Notes | Ref |
|---|---|---|---|---|---|---|---|---|---|
| 1 | Monday 14 September 1964 | Barrow | 11-22 | St. Helens | Craven Park | 8,125 | | | |
| 2 | Monday 14 September 1964 | Swinton | 11-5 | Wigan | Station Road | 13,422 | | | |
| 3 | Monday 21 September 1964 | Warrington | 19-4 | Oldham | Wilderspool | | | | |
| 4 | | Widnes | | bye | | | | | |

=== Round 3 – Semi-finals ===
Involved 2 matches and 4 clubs

| Game No | Fixture date | Home team | Score | Away team | Venue | Att | Rec | Notes | Ref |
|---|---|---|---|---|---|---|---|---|---|
| 1 | Tuesday 29 September 1964 | Warrington | 8-10 | St. Helens | Wilderspool | 19,258 | | | |
| 2 | Wednesday 30 September 1964 | Swinton | 11-7 | Widnes | Station Road | 9,250 | | | |

=== Final ===
| Game No | Fixture date | Home team | Score | Away team | Venue | Att | Rec | Notes | Ref |
|---|---|---|---|---|---|---|---|---|---|
| | Saturday 24 October 1964 | St. Helens | 12-4 | Swinton | Central Park | 17,383 | £3,393 | 1 | |

==== Teams and scorers ====
| St. Helens | No. | Swinton |
|---|---|---|
| | teams | |
| Frank Barrow | 1 | Ken Gowers (c) |
| Tom Pimblett | 2 | David Harries |
| Keith Northey | 3 | Bob Fleet |
| Billy Benyon | 4 | Alan Buckley |
| Len Killeen | 5 | John Speed |
| Peter Harvey | 6 | George Parkinson |
| Alex Murphy | 7 | Graham Williams |
| John Tembey | 8 | Harold Bate |
| Bob Dagnall | 9 | Derek Clarke |
| John Warlow | 10 | Ken Halliwell |
| Ray French | 11 | Graham Rees |
| Mervyn Hicks | 12 | Barry Simpson |
| Doug Laughton | 13 | Derek Hurt |
| Tony Barrow (non-playing substitute) | 14 | Billy Davies |
| Cliff Watson | 15 | Albert Cartwright |
| 12 | score | 4 |
| 5 | HT | 0 |
| | Scorers | |
| | Tries | |
| Billy Benyon (1) | T | |
| Mervyn Hicks (1) | T | |
| | T | |
| | Goals | |
| Len Kileen (3) | G | Ken Gowers (2) |
| | G | |
| | Drop Goals | |
| | DG | |
| Referee | | E. Clay (Leeds) |

Scoring - Try = three (3) points - Goal = two (2) points - Drop goal = two (2) points

=== The road to success ===
First round
Leigh | 10
Warrington | 13
Whitehaven | 10
Oldham | 31
Barrow | 10
Blackpool Borough | 5
Liverpool City | 11
St. Helens | 41
Workington Town | 2
Swinton | 6
Wigan | 36
Salford | 6
Widnes | 33
Rochdale Hornets | 0
blank
blank

Second round
Warrington | 19
Oldham | 4
Barrow | 11
St. Helens | 22
Swinton | 11
Wigan | 5
Widnes
bye

Semi-finals
Warrington | 8
St. Helens | 10
Swinton | 11
Widnes | 7

Final
St. Helens | 12
Swinton | 4

== Notes and comments ==
1 * Central Park was the home ground of Wigan with a final capacity of 18,000, although the record attendance was 47,747 for Wigan v St Helens 27 March 1959

== See also ==
- 1964–65 Northern Rugby Football League season
- Rugby league county cups
