= 2019 RFL 1895 Cup =

- Duration: 5 Rounds
- Number of teams: 20
- Winners: Sheffield Eagles
- Runners-up: Widnes Vikings
- Biggest home win: Doncaster 70–6; West Wales Raiders (5 May 2019)
- Biggest away win: Halifax 8–52; Sheffield Eagles (5 June 2019)
- Ray French Award: Anthony Thackeray (Sheffield Eagles)

The 2019 RFL 1895 Cup, known as the 2019 AB Sundecks 1895 Cup for sponsorship reasons, is the inaugural tournament for the RFL 1895 Cup, a rugby league football competition for clubs in the United Kingdom. The tournament was played between League 1 and Championship teams between May and August 2019. The format of the tournament was confirmed in December 2018, and consisted of five rounds. In round 1 eight League 1 teams played in a knock out round. Round 2 introduced the 12 English teams from the Championship who with the winners from round 1 will play eight ties. The quarter-finals and semi-finals followed in June and July, with the final played at Wembley Stadium on 24 August, with the Challenge Cup final also being played on this day.

The competition commenced in May without sponsorship but in June it was announced that the cup would be sponsored by AB Sundecks, owned by former Leigh Centurions chairman Derek Beaumont.

== Teams ==
The teams participating in the inaugural 1895 Cup are as follows:

=== League 1 ===
- Doncaster R.L.F.C.
- Hunslet R.L.F.C.
- Keighley Cougars
- Newcastle Thunder
- Oldham R.L.F.C.
- West Wales Raiders
- Whitehaven R.L.F.C.
- Workington Town

As some of the games in the later stages were scheduled for midweek, Coventry Bears, London Skolars and North Wales Crusaders decided against entering the competition for logistical reasons.

=== Championship ===
- Barrow Raiders
- Batley Bulldogs
- Bradford Bulls
- Dewsbury Rams
- Featherstone Rovers
- Halifax R.L.F.C.
- Leigh Centurions
- Rochdale Hornets
- Sheffield Eagles
- Swinton Lions
- Widnes Vikings
- York City Knights

Toulouse Olympique and Toronto Wolfpack were ineligible to enter the competition as the clubs are not full members of the Rugby Football League.

== First round ==
The first round ties were played on 4–5 May. The draw was made at Odsal Stadium on 12 March immediately after the draw for the fourth round of the Challenge Cup. The tie between Hunslet and Workington was streamed live on the RFL's OurLeague app.

Home	Score	Away	Match Information
Home	Score	Away	Date and Time	Venue	Referee	Attendance
Newcastle Thunder	38–12	Keighley Cougars	4 May 2019, 14:30	Kingston Park	T. Crashley	340
Hunslet	28–31	Workington Town	4 May 2019, 15:00	South Leeds Stadium	C. Smith	296
Doncaster	70–6	West Wales Raiders	5 May 2019, 15:00	Keepmoat Stadium	C. Worsley	248
Oldham	48–12	Whitehaven	5 May 2019, 15:00	Whitebank Stadium	J. Roberts	369

== Second round ==
The second round was played between 2–5 June. The draw was made on 5 May.

Home	Score	Away	Match Information
Home	Score	Away	Date and Time	Venue	Referee	Attendance
Batley Bulldogs	38–18	Rochdale Hornets	2 June 2019 15:00	Mount Pleasant	B. Pearson	700
Dewsbury Rams	44–26	Swinton Lions	2 June 2019 15:00	Tetleys Stadium	J. Smith	453
Leigh Centurions	62–12	Workington Town	2 June 2019 15:00	Leigh Sports Village	A. Sweet	1,660
Oldham	12–24	Doncaster	2 June 2019 15:00	Vestacare Stadium	M. Rossleigh	283
York City Knights	30–16	Newcastle Thunder	2 June 2019 15:00	Bootham Crescent	N. Bennett	796
Barrow Raiders	50–6	Bradford Bulls	5 June 2019 19:30	Craven Park	J. Child	1,161
Halifax	8–52	Sheffield Eagles	5 June 2019 20:00	Cougar Park	T. Grant	312
Widnes Vikings	22–16	Featherstone Rovers	5 June 2019 20:00	Halton Stadium	G. Dolan	1,515

== Quarter-finals ==
The quarter-finals were played during the week starting June 24.

Home	Score	Away	Match Information
Home	Score	Away	Date and Time	Venue	Referee	Attendance
Doncaster	28–32	Sheffield Eagles	26 June 2019 19:30	LD Nutrition Stadium	C. Worsley	374
Leigh Centurions	19–18	Barrow Raiders	26 June 2019 19:30	Totally Wicked Stadium	G. Hewer	1,012
York City Knights	16–17 (Note: After golden-point extra time)	Batley Bulldogs	26 June 2019 19:30	Bootham Crescent	T. Grant	1,395
Widnes Vikings	54–6	Dewsbury Rams	26 June 2019 20:00	Select Security Stadium	M. Mannifield	1,458

== Semi-finals ==
The semi-finals were played on Sunday 28 July.

Home	Score	Away	Match Information
Home	Score	Away	Date and Time	Venue	Referee	Attendance
Leigh Centurions	8–12	Widnes Vikings	28 July 2019, 15:00	Leigh Sports Village	B. Thaler	4,460
Sheffield Eagles	18–2	Batley Bulldogs	28 July 2019, 15:00	Olympic Legacy Park	G. Hewer	727

== Final ==
The final was played at Wembley Stadium on 24 August. Sheffield Eagles beat Widnes Vikings 36–18 after being 12–18 down at half-time. The inaugural winner of the Ray French Award was Sheffield's Anthony Thackeray.

Home	Score	Away	Match Information
Home	Score	Away	Date and Time	Venue	Referee	Attendance
Sheffield Eagles	36–18	Widnes Vikings	24 August 2019, 17:45	Wembley Stadium	C. Kendall	Not separately recorded (Note: Due to the game being played directly after the challenge cup final, the official attendance was 62,717)
