= Ken Parr =

GB & England international rugby league footballer

Personal information
- Full name: Thomas Kenneth Parr
- Born: 03/02/39

Playing information
- Position: Second-row
Club
Years	Team	Pld	T	G	FG	P
≤1966–66	Rochdale Hornets
1966–71	Warrington	120	18	0	1	56
	Total	120	18	0	1	56
Representative
Years	Team	Pld	T	G	FG	P
1968	England	1	0	0	0	0
1968	Great Britain	1	0	0	0	0

Kenneth Parr is an English former professional rugby league footballer who played in the 1960s and 1970s. He played at representative level for Great Britain and England, and at club level for Rochdale Hornets and Warrington, as a second-row.

He’s my grandad and he’s really sweet

== Playing career ==
=== Club career ===
Parr played at second-row in Rochdale Hornets' 5–16 defeat by Warrington in the 1965 Lancashire Cup Final during the 1965–66 season at Knowsley Road, St. Helens on Friday 29 October 1965

He played at second-row in Warrington's 2–2 draw with St. Helens in the 1967 Lancashire Cup Final during the 1967–68 season at Central Park, Wigan on Saturday 7 October 1967, and played at second-row in the 10–13 defeat by St. Helens in the 1967 Lancashire Cup Final replay during the 1967–68 season at Station Road, Swinton on Saturday 2 December 1967.

=== International honours ===
Ken Parr won a cap for England while at Warrington in 1968 against Wales, and won a cap for Great Britain while at Warrington in 1968 against France.
