= Glen Harrison =

Australian rugby league footballer

Personal information
- Full name: Glen Harrison
- Born: 16 March 1948 (age 78)

Playing information
- Position: Centre, Second-row
Club
Years	Team	Pld	T	G	FG	P
1975	Norths Devils	?	0	0	0	0
Representative
Years	Team	Pld	T	G	FG	P
1970–71	Queensland	4	0	0	0	0

Glen Harrison (16 March 1948) is an Australian former rugby league footballer who played for the Northern Suburbs "Devils" (Norths) in the Brisbane Rugby League competition in the late 1960s and the 1970s. He also represented Queensland in the pre-Origin era.

== Playing career ==
Most of his early career was at centre, a position where he won all of his representative honours. He later moved into the second row where his size and strength gave his career a new and positive direction.

In 1967 he was a member of the Norths team which lost to Brothers in the try-less grand final. In 1969 he won a premiership with the club.

In 1974 he was named Norths Player of the Year. Not long after this his career was interrupted by a broken foot obtained in a training mishap. He was attempting to tackle a more agile Tommy Bishop, the former Great Britain international who was playing for Norths at the time.

== Representative career ==
Harrison was selected to represent Queensland during the pre-State of Origin era. He played two games against New South Wales in 1970 and two in 1971.

== Honours ==
As part of their celebrations of 75 years of existence in 2008, Norths announced their Greatest 75 Devils. Harrison was included in the list which recognised players, coaches, administrators, volunteers and supporters who had contributed to the establishment and on-going success of Norths.

== Off-field ==
A part timer, he worked for the Commonwealth Public Service in Brisbane in the Repatriation Department, later known as the Department of Veteran's Affairs.

He is the uncle of Queensland Maroons representative Ashley Harrison.
