= Harold McCartney =

English rugby league footballer

Personal information
- Born: second ¼ 1945 (age 80–81) Pontefract district, England

Playing information
- Position: Prop
Club
Years	Team	Pld	T	G	FG	P
1963–68	Castleford	28	2	0	0	6

Harold McCartney (birth registered second ¼ 1945) is an English former professional rugby league footballer who played in the 1960s. He played at club level for Castleford.

== Background ==
Harold McCartney's birth was registered in Pontefract district, West Riding of Yorkshire, England.

== Playing career ==
=== County League appearances ===
Harold McCartney played in Castleford's victory in the Yorkshire League during the 1964–65 season.

=== BBC2 Floodlit Trophy Final appearances ===
Harold McCartney played at prop in Castleford's 7-2 victory over Swinton in the 1966 BBC2 Floodlit Trophy Final during the 1966–67 season at Wheldon Road, Castleford on Tuesday 20 December 1966.
