= Graham Williams (rugby league) =

English rugby league footballer and coach

Personal information
- Full name: Graham Williams
- Born: 28 July 1944 Swinton, Lancashire, England
- Died: 1 July 1994 (aged 49) Sydney, New South Wales, Australia

Playing information
- Position: Scrum-half
Club
Years	Team	Pld	T	G	FG	P
1962–68	Swinton	179	62	9	0	204
1969–71	North Sydney	39	9	0	2	31
1971–74	Manly-Warringah	30	6	0	1	19
1972–73	Hull F.C.	16	3	0	0	9
	Total	264	80	9	3	263
Representative
Years	Team	Pld	T	G	FG	P
1963–68	Lancashire	6	1	0	0	3

Coaching information
Club
Years	Team	Gms	W	D	L	W%
	Burleigh	0	0	0	0

Graham Williams (28 July 1944 – 1 July 1994) was an English professional rugby league footballer who played in the 1960s and 1970s and coached in the 1980s. He played at club level for Swinton, and in Australia for North Sydney and Manly-Warringah, as a scrum-half, and coached at club level in Australia for Burleigh.

== Rugby league career ==
Williams was born in July 1944 in Swinton near Manchester. He eventually signed for his local rugby league club Swinton, known since Victorian times as "the Lions". He played for Swinton during their two successive Rugby Football League Championship winning seasons; 1962–63 season and 1963–64 season.

Williams played scrum-half in Swinton's 4–12 defeat by St. Helens in the 1964 Lancashire Cup Final during the 1964–65 season at Central Park, Wigan on Saturday 24 October 1964.

Williams played scrum-half in Swinton's 2–7 defeat by Castleford in the 1966 BBC2 Floodlit Trophy Final during the 1966–67 season at Wheldon Road, Castleford on Tuesday 20 December 1966.

Williams then moved to Australia, joining North Sydney, and then Manly.

He briefly returned to England to play for Hull F.C. during the 1972–73 season.

He also played in the golden-oldies matches in the early 1980s, as well as spending some time on the Gold Coast, Queensland coaching Burleigh.

== Personal life ==
Williams' wife died in a parachuting accident. He remarried the daughter of a british naval officer who received both dso, dsm and grandfather of Williams step daughter british fashion designer Harlette DeFalaise founder of Harlette , Williams died in a motorbike accident on 1 July 1994.
