= 1965–66 Challenge Cup =

Rugby league competition

- Duration: 5 rounds
- Number of teams: 32
- Highest attendance: 98,536
- Broadcast partners: BBC TV
- Winners: St Helens
- Runners-up: Wigan
- Lance Todd Trophy: Len Killeen

The 1965–66 Challenge Cup was the 65th staging of rugby league's oldest knockout competition, the Challenge Cup.

The final was contested by St Helens and Wigan at Wembley Stadium in London.

The final was played on Saturday 21 May 1966, where St Helens beat Wigan 21–2 in front of a crowd of 98,536.

The Lance Todd Trophy was awarded to St Helens winger Len Killeen, who also kicked an exceptionally long goal from well inside his own half.

== First round ==
Date	Team one	Team two	Score
25 Feb	Widnes	Brookhouse	23-5
26 Feb	Barrow	Crosfield Recs	11-2
26 Feb	Batley	Huddersfield	4-4
26 Feb	Blackpool Borough	Workington Town	2-16
26 Feb	Bradford Northern	Doncaster	23-2
26 Feb	Bramley	Hull Kingston Rovers	5-5
26 Feb	Featherstone Rovers	Rochdale Hornets	22-6
26 Feb	Hull	Salford	11-2
26 Feb	Hunslet	Whitehaven	7-9
26 Feb	Keighley	Dewsbury	4-5
26 Feb	Leeds	York	17-4
26 Feb	Leigh	Liverpool City	15-6
26 Feb	Swinton	Oldham	18-5
26 Feb	Wakefield Trinity	St Helens	0-10
26 Feb	Warrington	Castleford	15-7
26 Feb	Wigan	Halifax	8-4
01 Mar - replay	Huddersfield	Batley	23-5
01 Mar - replay	Hull Kingston Rovers	Bramley	7-2

== Second round ==
Date	Team one	Team two	Score
19 Mar	Leeds	Hull	22-12
19 Mar	Featherstone Rovers	Warrington	14-15
19 Mar	Wigan	Whitehaven	40-6
19 Mar	Widnes	Bradford Northern	6-7
19 Mar	Huddersfield	Leigh	8-0
19 Mar	Workington Town	Hull Kingston Rovers	5-7
19 Mar	Dewsbury	Barrow	23-15
19 Mar	St Helens	Swinton	16-4

== Quarter-finals ==
Date	Team one	Team two	Score
04 Apr	St Helens	Hull Kingston Rovers	12-10
05 Apr	Dewsbury	Huddersfield	8-2
06 Apr	Bradford Northern	Wigan	6-15
06 Apr	Warrington	Leeds	2-2
15 Apr	Leeds	Warrington	8-0

== Semi-finals ==
Date	Team one	Team two	Score
16 Apr	St Helens	Dewsbury	12-5
23 Apr	Wigan	Leeds	7-2

== Final ==
21 May 1966

St Helens	21 – 2	Wigan
Try: Bishop, Killeen, Mantle; Goal: Killeen (5), Mantle	Report	Goal: Gilfedder

Wembley Stadium, London
Attendance: 98,536
Referee: H. G. Hunt (Warrington)
Player of the Match: Len Killeen

FB	1	Frank Barrow
RW	2	Tom van Vollenhoven
RC	3	Alex Murphy
LC	4	Billy Benyon
LW	5	Len Killeen
SO	6	Peter Harvey
SH	7	Tommy Bishop
PR	8	Albert Halsall
HK	9	Bill Sayer
PR	10	Cliff Watson
SR	11	Ray French
SR	12	John Warlow
LF	13	John Mantle
Substitutes (not used):
IC	14	Tony Barrow
IC	15	Jeff Hitchen
Coach:
Joe Coan

FB	1	Ray Ashby
RW	2	Billy Boston
RC	3	David Stephens
LC	4	Eric Ashton (c)
LW	5	Trevor Lake
SO	6	Cliff Hill
SH	7	Frank Parr
PR	8	Danny Gardiner
HK	9	Tom Woosey
PR	10	Brian McTigue
SR	11	Tony Stephens
SR	12	Laurie Gilfedder
LF	13	Harry Major
Substitutes (not used):
IC	14	?
IC	15	?
Player-coach:
Eric Ashton

Crowd listed in some sources as 100,000 for Final.
