= 1972–73 BBC2 Floodlit Trophy =

- Structure: Floodlit knockout championship
- Teams: 18
- Winners: Leigh
- Runners-up: Widnes

The 1972–73 BBC2 Floodlit Trophy was the eighth occasion on which the BBC2 Floodlit Trophy competition had been held. This year was another new name on the trophy: Leigh won the trophy by beating Widnes by the score of 5-0. The match was played at Central Park, Wigan, (historically in the county of Lancashire). The attendance was 4,691 and receipts were £1,391.

This was Leigh's first victory after being runner-up in two of the previous finals.

== Background ==
This season saw no changes in the entrants, no new members and no withdrawals, the number remaining at eighteen.

The format remained the same as the last season with the preliminary round played on a two-legged home and away basis and the rest of the tournament being played on a knock-out basis.

The preliminary round involved four clubs, to reduce the numbers to sixteen.

== Competition and results ==
=== Preliminary round ===
Involved 2 matches and 4 clubs

==== First leg ====
Game No	Fixture date	Home team	Score	Away team	Venue	agg	Att	Rec	Notes	Ref
P1	Tue 5 Sep 1972	Wakefield Trinity	7-7	Hull F.C.	Belle Vue					
P1	Tue 12 Sep 1972	Hull Kingston Rovers	15-6	Rochdale Hornets	Craven Park (1)					

==== Second leg ====
Game No	Fixture date	Home team	Score	Away team	Venue	agg	Att	Rec	Notes	Ref
P2	Tue 19 Sep 1972	Hull F.C.	3-11	Wakefield Trinity	Boulevard	10-18			1	
P2	Tue 26 Sep 1972	Rochdale Hornets	9-23	Hull Kingston Rovers	Athletic Grounds	15-38				

=== Round 1 ===
Involved 8 matches and 16 clubs

Game No	Fixture date	Home team	Score	Away team	Venue	Att	Rec	Notes	Ref
1	Tue 3 Oct 1972	Barrow	9-12	Keighley	Craven Park			2	
2	Tue 3 Oct 1972	Oldham	12-8	Salford	Watersheddings				
3	Wed 4 Oct 1972	Hull Kingston Rovers	10-12	Leigh	Craven Park (1)				
4	Tue 10 Oct 1972	St. Helens	6-14	Leeds	Knowsley Road				
5	Tue 17 Oct 1972	Huddersfield	9-15	Castleford	Fartown				
6	Tue 24 Oct 1972	Wigan	26-6	Halifax	Central Park			3	
7	Wed 25 Oct 1972	Swinton	6-18	Wakefield Trinity	Station Road				
8	Tue 31 Oct 1972	Warrington	18-18	Widnes	Wilderspool				

==== Replay ====
Game No	Fixture date	Home team	Score	Away team	Venue	Att	Rec	Notes	Ref
R	Tue 14 Nov 1972	Widnes	14-11	Warrington	Naughton Park				

=== Round 2 ===
Involved 4 matches with 8 clubs

Game No	Fixture date	Home team	Score	Away team	Venue	Att	Rec	Notes	Ref
1	Tue 7 Nov 1972	Oldham	9-7	Castleford	Watersheddings				
2	Tue 14 Nov 1972	Wakefield Trinity	19-2	Keighley	Belle Vue				
3	Tue 21 Nov 1972	Widnes	9-4	Leeds	Naughton Park				
4	Tue 28 Nov 1972	Wigan	14-16	Leigh	Central Park			3	

=== Semi-finals ===
Involved 2 matches and 4 clubs

Game No	Fixture date	Home team	Score	Away team	Venue	Att	Rec	Notes	Ref
1	Tue 5 Dec 1972	Leigh	10-8	Oldham	Hilton Park				
2	Tue 12 Dec 1972	Widnes	16-9	Wakefield Trinity	Naughton Park				

=== Final ===
Game No	Fixture date	Home team	Score	Away team	Venue	Att	Rec	Notes	Ref
F	Tuesday 19 December 1972	Leigh	5-0	Widnes	Central Park	4,691	1,391	3 4 5 6	

==== Teams and scorers ====
Leigh	No.	Widnes
	teams	
Mick Hogan	1	Ray Dutton
Graeme Lawson	2	Alan Prescott
John Atkin	3	Bob Blackwood (NOTE 6)
Mick Collins	4	Mal Aspey (NOTE 7)
Mick Stacey	5	Paul McDonnell
Tony Barrow	6	Ged Lowe
Cliff Sayer	7	Alan Ashton
Paul Grimes	8	Jim Mills
Derek Clarke	9	Keith Elwell
Geoff Fletcher	10	John Warlow
Jim Fiddler	11	John Foran
Frank Barrow	12	Barry Sheridan
Thomas Martyn	13	George Nicholls
Les Pearce	Coach	Vince Karalius
5	score	0
0	HT	0
	Scorers	
	Tries	
G. Lawson (1)	T	
	Goals	
Jim Fiddler (1)	G	
Referee		Fred Lindop (Wakefield)

Scoring - Try = three (3) points - Goal = two (2) points - Drop goal = two (2) points

=== The road to success ===
This tree excludes any preliminary round fixtures

First round
Wigan	26
Halifax	6
Hull Kingston Rovers	10
Leigh	12
Oldham	12
Salford	8
Huddersfield	9
Castleford	15
Warrington	18 (11)
Widnes	18 (14)
St. Helens	6
Leeds	14
Swinton	6
Wakefield Trinity	18
Barrow	9
Keighley	12

Second round
Wigan	14
Leigh	16
Oldham	9
St Helens	7
Widnes	9
Leeds	4
Wakefield Trinity	19
Keighley	2

Semi-finals
Leigh	10
Oldham	8
Widnes	16
Wakefield Trinity	9

Final
Leigh	5
Widnes	0

== Notes and comments ==
1 * Wakefield Trinity, who joined the competition in season 1967–68, win their first game in the competition
2 * Keighley (who joined the competition in season 1967–68) win their first match in the competition
3 * This match was televised
4 * This was the second of only two occasions when the BBC2 Floodlit Trophy final was played on a neutral ground
5 * Rothmans Rugby League Yearbook 1990-1991 and 1991-92 give the attendance as 4,691, but RUGBYLEAGUEprojects gives it as 4,841
6 * The Widnes official archives give this player, Bob Blackwood as number 3 but Rothmans Rugby League Yearbook 1990-91 and 1991-92 give the position as 4
7 * The Widnes official archives give this player, Mal Aspey as number 4 but Rothmans Tearbook 1990-91 and 1991-92 give the position as 3

== See also ==
- 1972–73 Northern Rugby Football League season
- 1972 Lancashire Cup
- 1972 Yorkshire Cup
- BBC2 Floodlit Trophy
- Rugby league county cups
