= John Walker (rugby league) =

English rugby league footballer

Playing information
- Position: Loose forward, Hooker
Club
Years	Team	Pld	T	G	FG	P
1960–67	Castleford	220	27	0	0	81
1967–69	Hunslet	45	9	0	0	27
	Total	265	36	0	0	108
Representative
Years	Team	Pld	T	G	FG	P
1963	Yorkshire	1	0	0	0	0

John Walker is a former professional rugby league footballer who played in the 1960s. He played at club level for Castleford.

== Playing career ==
=== Club career ===
Walker played in Castleford's victory in the Yorkshire League during the 1964–65 season.

Walker played loose forward in Castleford's 7-2 victory over Swinton in the 1966 BBC2 Floodlit Trophy Final during the 1966–67 season at Wheldon Road, Castleford on Tuesday 20 December 1966.

He was transferred to Hunslet in December 1967 for a fee of £2,000.

=== County honors ===
Walker won a cap for Yorkshire while at Castleford; he played at second-row in the 13-15 defeat by Cumberland at Belle Vue, Wakefield on Wednesday 25 September 1963.
