= RFL 1895 Cup =

Rugby league competition in the United Kingdom

1895 Cup
- Current season or competition: 2026 RFL 1895 Cup
- Sport: Rugby league
- Formerly known as: Championship Cup
- Instituted: 2019; 7 years ago
- Inaugural season: 2019
- Number of teams: 21
- Nations: England; Wales
- Holders: London Broncos (2026)
- Most titles: Featherstone Rovers; Halifax Panthers; Leigh Centurions; London Broncos; Sheffield Eagles; Wakefield Trinity; York Knights; (1 title)
- Broadcast partner: BBC (Final only) SuperLeague+
- Related competition: Championship

The Rugby Football League 1895 Cup is an annual rugby league knockout tournament for clubs in the Championship.

== History and format ==
There have been many cup competitions for the lower leagues of rugby league. In 2002 the Championship Cup was founded for Championship and League 1 clubs to compete in along with the Challenge Cup, with the aim to give the lower league clubs a competition they can realistically win. The Championship Cup folded in 2013 in anticipation for the 2015 league restructuring. There was no replacement for Championship clubs, though the League 1 Cup ran from 2015-2017 for teams from that league.

=== 2019 tournament ===
The new competition, named in honour of the founding of the Northern Union in 1895, was put to the Championship and League 1 clubs 1895, to start in the 2019 season. The inaugural 2019 tournament involved a qualifying first round for the eight League 1 clubs which entered, followed by a straight knock-out when the winners of that round joined the twelve Championship sides to make a last-16. The final was played at Wembley on 24 August immediately after the 2019 Challenge Cup final.

=== Covid-19 era ===
However, this format lasted only one season as the 2020 competition did not take place due to the Covid-19 pandemic. With Covid-19 still affecting the 2021 season, a new format which merged the early rounds of the tournament with the Challenge Cup was approved. In 2021, the four sides which progressed from the second round of the Challenge Cup also qualified for the 1895 Cup semi-finals. An adapted version of this format was played in 2022 and 2023, to reflect the re-expansion of the Challenge Cup after Covid. In this version, the five qualifiers - including any amateur teams - from the fifth round of the Challenge Cup would qualify for the 1895 Cup. Any teams who reached the sixth round of the Challenge Cup would qualify directly to the semi-finals of the 1895 Cup, with two of the remaining qualified teams drawn into a play-off round before the semi-final stage.

=== 2024 format ===
A refreshed format for the 2024 Cup separated it back out from Challenge Cup, as the need to limit games post-Covid was reduced. This format introduced a group stage, into which thirteen Championship and eight League One clubs entered. The group stage consisted of seven groups of three, with winners and the best performing runners-up qualifying for the knock-out competition from the quarter-final stage.

=== 2025 format ===
The format was revised again for 2025, becoming a knockout competition. The 11 League One clubs competed in two preliminary rounds to produce four qualifiers to take part in the last 16, where they were joined by the 12 Championship clubs. In the 2026 season, following the merger of League One with the Championship, a similar format was announced for the 2026 competition with three matches in the preliminary round. The three Championship clubs still competing in the Challenge Cup were exempted from the draw for this round.

== Results ==
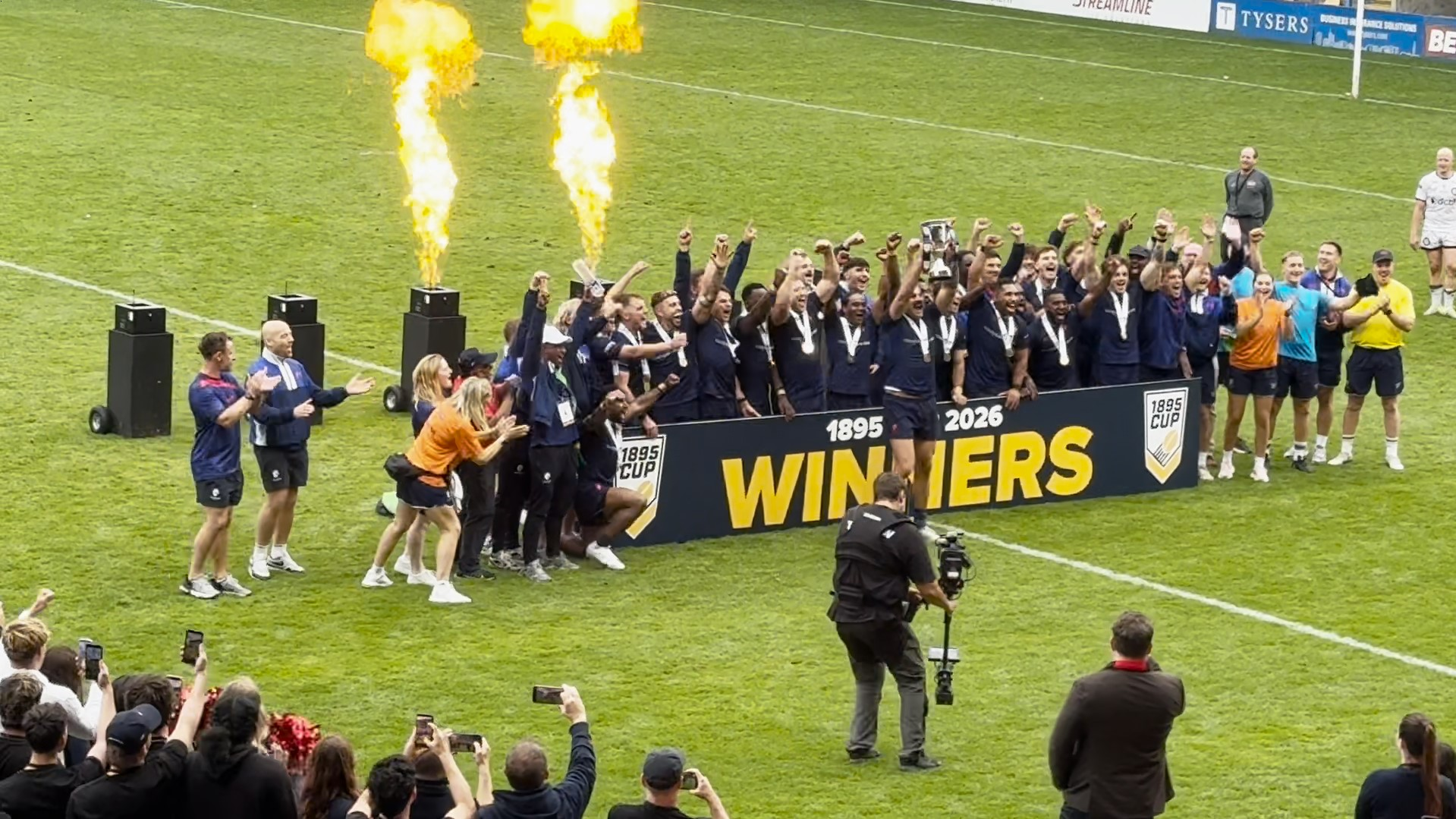
London Broncos lifting the trophy in 2026

Season	Winners	Score	Runners-up	Venue	Reports
2019	Sheffield Eagles	36–18	Widnes Vikings	Wembley Stadium	
2020	Competition cancelled due to the COVID-19 pandemic				
2021	Featherstone Rovers	41–34	York City Knights	Wembley Stadium	
2022	Leigh Centurions	30–16	Featherstone Rovers	Tottenham Hotspur Stadium	
2023	Halifax Panthers	12–10	Batley Bulldogs	Wembley Stadium	
2024	Wakefield Trinity	50–6	Sheffield Eagles	Wembley Stadium	
2025	York Knights	5–4 (Note: Golden point)	Featherstone Rovers	Wembley Stadium	
2026	London Broncos	32–10	Widnes Vikings	Halliwell Jones Stadium	

=== Team performance ===
Team	Winners	Runners-up	Years won	Years runner-up
Featherstone Rovers	1	2	2021	2022, 2025
Sheffield Eagles	1	1	2019	2024
York Knights	1	1	2025	2021 (Note: as York City Knights)
Halifax Panthers	1	0	2023	N/A
Leigh Centurions	1	0	2022	N/A
Wakefield Trinity	1	0	2024	N/A
London Broncos	1	0	2026	N/A
Widnes Vikings	0	2	–	2019, 2026
Batley Bulldogs	0	1	–	2023

== Awards ==
In August 2019 the Rugby Football League ran a poll among fans on the Our League app to name a trophy for the man of the match award in the 1895 Cup Final. The three names in the poll were Ray French, Willie Horne and Johnny Whiteley. French won the poll with over 60% of the votes cast and presented the award at the inaugural final on 24 August 2019 to Sheffield's Anthony Thackeray.

=== Award winners ===
Season	Recipient	Team	Ref
2019	Anthony Thackeray	Sheffield Eagles	
2020	Not awarded – no competition played due to the COVID-19 pandemic		
2021	Craig Hall	Featherstone Rovers	
2022	Edwin Ipape	Leigh Centurions	
2023	Louis Jouffret	Halifax Panthers	
2024	Luke Gale	Wakefield Trinity	
2025	Liam Harris	York Knights	
2026	Dean Hawkins	London Broncos	

== Sponsors ==
In June 2019 it was announced that the cup would be sponsored by AB Sundecks, owned by former Leigh Centurions chairman Derek Beaumont.
