= Trevor Lake =

Zimbabwean rugby union & league footballer

Personal information
- Born: 24 January 1939 Umtali, Rhodesia
- Died: 2025 (aged 85–86)

Playing information

Rugby union
- Position: Wing
Representative
Years	Team	Pld	T	G	FG	P
	Rhodesia

Rugby league
- Position: Wing
Club
Years	Team	Pld	T	G	FG	P
1962–66	Wigan	139	132	0	0	396
1967–68	St. George	8	4	0	0	12
	Total	147	136	0	0	408
Representative
Years	Team	Pld	T	G	FG	P
1965	Commonwealth XIII	1	0	0	0	0

Trevor Lake (1939 – 2025) was a rugby league and rugby union footballer who played as a wing. He played in England for Wigan, with whom he won the 1965 Challenge Cup, and in Australia for St. George.

== Playing career ==
=== Rugby union ===
Born in Rhodesia, Lake initially played rugby union. He made eight appearances for the Rhodesia national team, and played for the Junior Springboks against the touring British Lions in 1962.

=== Wigan ===
In October 1962, Lake agreed to join English rugby league club Wigan. The following month, he made a try-scoring debut against Oldham at Central Park. With Billy Boston and Frank Carlton established as Wigan's first choice wingers, Lake's appearances were limited during his first season at the club. In 1963–64, he played more regularly for the first team, and scored 43 tries during the season, a total only exceeded by Swinton's John Stopford.

In 1964–65, Lake was the top try scorer in British rugby league, touching down 40 times during the season. He also won his first silverware with the club in the 1965 Challenge Cup final, scoring two tries in the 20–16 win against Hunslet. He was slightly less prolific in 1965–66, finishing the season with 32 tries, but the total was still enough to finish as the league's joint top-scorer with St Helens' winger Len Killeen.

In his final season with Wigan, he played in the club's 1966–67 Lancashire Cup final victory against Oldham. Overall, he scored 132 tries in 139 appearances during his four years at the club.

Outside of rugby league, Lake worked as a car salesman during his time in England.

=== St George ===
In October 1966, Lake accepted an offer to play for Australian club St. George. However, he made just eight first grade appearances in two seasons due to knee injury problems.

== Post-playing ==
In the early 1990s, Lake was involved in attempts to re-establish rugby league in South Africa, and was named the inaugural chairman of the South African Rugby Football League.
