= Bob Prosser =

Wales dual-code rugby and GB international rugby league footballer

Robert Prosser
Personal information
- Full name: Robert Prosser
- Born: 8 August 1943 (age 83) Tylorstown, Wales

Playing information
- Height: 5 ft 6 in (1.68 m)
- Weight: 11 st 7 lb (73 kg)

Rugby union
- Position: Scrum-half
Club
Years	Team	Pld	T	G	FG	P
≤1961–61	Coventry R.F.C.
1961–≤15 Sep 65	Newport RFC	148	19			57
	Total	148	19	0	0	57
Representative
Years	Team	Pld	T	G	FG	P
	Crawshays RFC

Rugby league
- Position: Stand-off, Scrum-half
Club
Years	Team	Pld	T	G	FG	P
Sep 1965–Feb 67	St. Helens	45	2	0	0	6
Jan 1968–Mar 74	Salford	106+22	21	0	0	63
	Total	173	23	0	0	69
Representative
Years	Team	Pld	T	G	FG	P
1968–70	Wales	4	0	0	0	0
1965	GB Under 24	1	0	0	0	0

Robert "Rob"/"Bob" Prosser (born 14 November 1943) is a Welsh former rugby union, and professional rugby league footballer who played in the 1960s and 1970s. He played invitational level rugby union (RU) for Crawshays RFC, and at club level for Coventry R.F.C. and Newport RFC, as a scrum-half, and representative level rugby league (RL) for Wales, and at club level for St. Helens and Salford, as a stand-off, or scrum-half.

== Playing career ==
=== International honours ===
Prosser won 4 caps for Wales (RL) in 1968–1970 while at Salford.

=== Championship final appearances ===
Prosser was an unused substitute in St. Helens' 35-12 victory over Halifax in the Championship Final during the 1965–66 season at Station Road, Swinton on Saturday 28 May 1966, in front of a crowd of 30,165.

=== BBC2 Floodlit Trophy Final appearances ===
Prosser played scrum-half in St. Helens' 0-4 defeat by Castleford in the 1965 BBC2 Floodlit Trophy Final during the 1965–66 season at Knowsley Road, St. Helens on Tuesday 14 December 1965.
