= Trevor Bedford =

English rugby league player

Personal information
- Died: 2015

Playing information
Club
Years	Team	Pld	T	G	FG	P
≤1962–62	Dewsbury
1962–70	Castleford	111	6	0	0	18
1970–76	Huddersfield
	Total	111	6	0	0	18
Representative
Years	Team	Pld	T	G	FG	P
1965	Great Britain U-24	1	1	0	0	4

Trevor Bedford was a former professional rugby league footballer who played in the 1960s and 1970s, who played at club level for Dewsbury and Castleford.

== Playing career ==
=== Castleford ===
Bedford played in Castleford's victory in the Yorkshire League during the 1964–65 season.

=== Representative career ===
On 3 April 1965, Bedford played in the first ever Great Britain under-24 international match in a 17–9 win against France under-24's.
