= Bryan Todd (rugby league) =

English rugby league footballer

Personal information
- Born: 5 April 1938 England
- Died: 9 June 2018 (aged 80) Aberglasslyn, New South Wales, Australia

Playing information
- Position: Centre
Club
| Years | Team | Pld | T | G | FG | P |
|---|---|---|---|---|---|---|
| | York |
| | Halifax |
| 1960–64 | Keighley | 104 | 28 | 7 | | 98 |
| 1964 | St. Helens | 17 | 5 | 7 | | 29 |
| 1964–65 | Bradford Northern | 13 | 2 | 5 | | 16 |
| 1968 | Keighley | 3 | | 4 | | 12 |
| 1969–70 | Bradford Northern | 4 | 1 | | | 3 |
| | Total | 141 | 36 | 23 | 0 | 158 |
Representative
| Years | Team | Pld | T | G | FG | P |
| 1964 | Yorkshire | 2 | 0 | 0 | 0 | 0 |

Bryan Todd (5 April 1938 – 9 June 2018) was an English professional rugby league footballer who played in the 1960s. He played at representative level for Yorkshire, and at club level for York, Halifax, Keighley (two spells), St. Helens, and Bradford Northern (two spells), as a centre.

== Background ==
Bryan Todd later emigrated to Australia.

== Playing career ==
=== Championship final appearances ===
Bryan Todd was an unused substitute in Halifax's 15–7 victory over St. Helens in the 1964–65 Championship Final during the 1964–65 season at Station Road, Swinton on Saturday 22 May 1965.

== Honours ==
Halifax

- Rugby Football League: 1964–65
