= Albert Halsall =

English rugby league footballer

Personal information
- Full name: Albert Halsall
- Born: 19 April 1942 Wigan district, England
- Died: 25 August 2011 (aged 69) Wigan, Greater Manchester, England

Playing information
- Weight: 15 st 7 lb (98 kg)
- Position: Prop, Second-row
Club
| Years | Team | Pld | T | G | FG | P |
|---|---|---|---|---|---|---|
| 1962–66 | Salford | 106 | 11 | 0 | 0 | 33 |
| 1966–70 | St. Helens | 114+8 | 13 | 0 | 0 | 39 |
| 1970–≥70 | Swinton |
| 1972–73 | Oldham RLFC | 4 | 1 | 0 | 0 | 3 |
| | Total | 232 | 25 | 0 | 0 | 75 |
Representative
| Years | Team | Pld | T | G | FG | P |
| 1966–72 | Lancashire | 5 | 0 | 0 | 0 | 0 |

Albert Halsall (19 April 1942 – 25 August 2011) was an English professional rugby league footballer who played in the 1960s and 1970s. He played at representative level for Lancashire, and at club level for Salford, St Helens, Swinton and Oldham RLFC, as a prop, or second-row.

== Background ==
Albert Halsall's birth was registered in Wigan district, Lancashire, and his death aged 69 was registered in Wigan, Greater Manchester, England.

== Playing career ==
=== County honours ===
Albert Halsall represented Lancashire on three occasions while at St. Helens.

=== Championship final appearances ===
Albert Halsall played at prop, scored three tries, and was man of the match winning the Harry Sunderland Trophy in St Helens' 35–12 victory over Halifax in the Championship Final during the 1965–66 season at Station Road, Swinton on Saturday 28 May 1966, in front of a crowd of 30,165, and played at prop in St. Helens' 24–12 victory over Leeds in the Championship Final during the 1969–70 season at Odsal Stadium, Bradford on Saturday 16 May 1970.

=== County League Championships ===
Albert Halsall played in St. Helens' victories in the Lancashire League during the 1965–66 season, 1966–67 season and 1968–69 season.

=== Challenge Cup Final appearances ===
Albert Halsall played at prop in St. Helens' 21–2 victory over Wigan in the 1966 Challenge Cup Final during the 1965–66 season at Wembley Stadium, London on Saturday 21 May 1966, in front of a crowd of 98,536.

=== County Cup Final appearances ===
Albert Halsall played at prop in St. Helens' 4–7 defeat by Leigh in the 1970 Lancashire Cup Final during the 1970–71 season at Station Road, Swinton on Saturday 28 November 1970, and played at prop in Swinton's 11–25 defeat by Salford in the 1972 Lancashire Cup Final during the 1972–73 season at Wilderspool Stadium, Warrington on Saturday 21 October 1972.
