= Les Pearce (Welsh rugby) =

Wales international rugby league footballer & coach (1923–2018)

Personal information
- Full name: Leslie Pearce
- Born: 13 October 1923 Swansea, Wales
- Died: 21 April 2018 (aged 94)

Playing information

Rugby union
- Position: Lock
Club
Years	Team	Pld	T	G	FG	P
1948–49	Swansea RFC	31	4			12

Rugby league
- Position: Second-row
Club
Years	Team	Pld	T	G	FG	P
1949–59	Halifax	120	16	0	0	48
1959–??	Dewsbury
	Total	120	16	0	0	48

Coaching information
Club
Years	Team	Gms	W	D	L	W%
	Halifax
1972–74	Leigh
	Dewsbury
	Total	0	0	0	0
Representative
Years	Team	Gms	W	D	L	W%
1975	Wales	9	3	0	6	33

Leslie Pearce (13 October 1923 – 21 April 2018) was a Welsh rugby union and professional rugby league footballer who played in the 1940s and 1950s, and coached rugby league in the 1970s. He played club level rugby union (RU) for Swansea RFC as a lock, and club level rugby league (RL) for Halifax as a second-row, and coached representative level rugby league (RL) for Wales, and at club level for Halifax, Leigh and Dewsbury.

== Background ==
Les Pearce was born in Swansea. He had three siblings named Ash, Flora, and Jhonaston. Pearce died in 2018, aged 94.

== Coaching career ==
=== Halifax ===
Pearce was coach of the Halifax team which won the 1971–72 Player's No.6 Trophy Final with a 22–11 victory over Wakefield Trinity. The match was played at Odsal Stadium on Saturday, 22 January 1972.

=== Leigh ===
He moved to Leigh as their head coach. They had a 5–0 victory over Widnes in the 1972 BBC2 Floodlit Trophy Final, during the 1972–73 season, at Central Park on Tuesday, 19 December 1972.

=== Wales ===
Pearce went on to coach Wales in the 1975 Rugby League World Cup.
