= 1966–67 BBC2 Floodlit Trophy =

- Structure: Floodlit knockout championship
- Teams: 11
- Winners: Castleford
- Runners-up: Swinton

The 1966–67 BBC2 Floodlit Trophy was the second occasion on which the BBC2 Floodlit Trophy competition had been held. Castleford won the trophy by beating Swinton by the score of 7-2. The match was played at Wheldon Road, Castleford, now in West Yorkshire. The attendance was 8,986. This was the second of Castleford's three successive victories in the first three editions of the Floodlit Trophy.

== Background ==
This season the original eight invitees were joined by Barrow, Rochdale Hornets and Salford bringing the total of entrants up to eleven, an increase of three. This involved the introduction of a preliminary knock-out round on a two legged home and away basis, to reduce the numbers to eight, followed by a mini-league and with the semi-finals and final stages again being on a knock out basis.

== Competition and results ==
=== Preliminary round – first leg ===
Involved 3 matches and 6 Clubs

Game No	Fixture Date	Home team	Score	Away team	Venue	Agg	Att	Rec	Notes	Ref
1	Mon 15 Aug 1966	Leigh	11-16	Castleford	Hilton Park					
2	Tue 6 Sep 1966	Swinton	21-5	Rochdale Hornets	Station Road				1	
3	Wed 7 Sep 1966	Salford	10-19	St. Helens	The Willows		5000		2	

=== Preliminary round – second leg ===
Involved 3 matches and 6 Clubs

Game No	Fixture Date	Home team	Score	Away team	Venue	Agg	Att	Rec	Notes	Ref
1	Wed 7 Sep 1966	Castleford	39-18	Leigh	Wheldon Road	55-29			3	
2	Wed 5 Oct 1966	Rochdale Hornets	14-14	Swinton	Athletic Grounds	19-35			4	
3	Mon 26 Sep 1966	St. Helens	40-5	Salford	Knowsley Road	59-15	8500		5	

=== Round 1 – first qualifying round ===
Involved 4 matches and 8 Clubs

Game No	Fixture Date	Home team	Score	Away team	Venue	Att	Rec	Notes	Ref
1	Tue 4 Oct 1966	Oldham	7-10	Barrow	Watersheddings			6	
2	Tue 11 Oct 1966	Leeds	11-11	Castleford	Headingley				
3	Tue 18 Oct 1966	St. Helens	11-9	Swinton	Knowsley Road	8500			
4	Tue 25 Oct 1966	Warrington	4-14	Widnes	Wilderspool				

=== Round 2 – second qualifying round ===
Involved 4 matches with the same 8 clubs - but NOT reverse fixtures

Game No	Fixture Date	Home team	Score	Away team	Venue	Att	Rec	Notes	Ref
1	Tue 1 Nov 1966	Barrow	11-11	St. Helens	Craven Park	6657		7	
2	Tue 8 Nov 1966	Castleford	31-10	Warrington	Wheldon Road				
3	Tue 22 Nov 1966	Widnes	11-14	Oldham	Naughton Park				
4	Tue 29 Nov 1966	Swinton	10-4	Leeds	Station Road				

=== Qualifying league table ===
Pos	Club	P	W	D	L	PF	PA	Pts	PD	Notes	Ref
1	Castleford	2	1	1		42	21	21	3		
2	Widnes	2	1		1	25	18	7	2		
3	Swinton	2	1		1	19	15	4	2		
4	Barrow	2	1	1		21	18	3	3		
5	St. Helens	2	1	1		22	20	2	3		
6	Oldham	2	1		1	21	21	0	2		
7	Leeds	2		1	1	15	21	-6	1		
8	Warrington	2			2	14	45	-31	0		

Pos = Finishing position P = Games played W = Wins D = Drqw L = Lose
PF = Points scored PA = Points against Pts = League points PD = Points scored difference

==== To progress to the next stage ====
The rules stated that the four clubs with the greatest total winning margins were to qualify, and proceed, to the semi-final. The four clubs in this case were Castleford, Widnes, Swinton and Barrow.

=== Round 3 – semi-finals ===
Involved 2 matches and 4 Clubs

Game No	Fixture Date	Home team	Score	Away team	Venue	Att	Rec	Notes	Ref
1	Tue 6 Dec 1966	Castleford	21-5	Barrow	Wheldon Road				
2	Tue 13 Dec 1966	Widnes	6-19	Swinton	Naughton Park				

=== Final ===
Game No	Fixture Date	Home team	Score	Away team	Venue	Att	Rec	Notes	Ref
	Tuesday 20 December 1966	Castleford	7-2	Swinton	Wheldon Road	8,986	1,692	8	

==== Teams and scorers ====
Castleford	№	Swinton
	teams	
Derek Edwards	1	Ken Gowers (Capt.)
Keith Howe	2	Derek Whitehead
Ian Stenton	3	John Gomersall
Ron Willett	4	Alan Buckley
Jack Austin	5	Reg Williams
Alan "Chuck" Hardisty (capt.)	6	Bob Fleet
Keith Hepworth	7	Graham Williams
Denis Hartley	8	Ken Halliwell
Clive Dickinson	9	Derek Clarke
Harold McCartney	10	Bernard Scott
Wiliam "Bill" Bryant	11	Graham Rees
Peter Small	12	Malcolm Cummings
John Walker	13	David Robinson
Glyn Jones (unused)	14	William Davies
Tony Miller (unused)	15	Barry Simpson
George Clinton	Coach	Cliff Evans
7	score	2
7	HT	2
	Scorers	
	Tries	
Jack Austin (1)	T	
	Goals	
Ron Willett (1)	G	Derek Whitehead (1)
Keith Hepworth (1)	G	
Referee		J Manley (Warrington)

Scoring - Try = three (3) points - Goal = two (2) points - Drop goal = two (2) points

=== The play-offs ===
Semi-Finals
2	St. Helens	9
3	Swinton	5
1	Widnes	9
4	Castleford	12

Final
St. Helens	0
Castleford	4

== Notes and comments ==
1 * Rochdale Hornets join the competition and play first game in the competition
2 * Salford join the competition and play first game in the competition, and first at home in the competition
3 * At the time this was the highest score, highest aggregate score and greatest winning margin, but to be broken three weeks later
4 * Rochdale Hornets play their first game at home in the competition
5 * At the time this was the highest score, highest aggregate score and greatest winning margin
6 * Barrow join the competition and play first game in the competition
7 * Barrow play their first game at home in the competition
8 * Wheldon Road is the home ground of Castleford. The first match was played there in 1927 and the current capacity in the region of 13,000 although the record attendance was 25,449 set in 1935 in a Challenge Cup match against Hunslet.

== See also ==
- 1966–67 Northern Rugby Football League season
- 1966 Lancashire Cup
- 1966 Yorkshire Cup
- BBC2 Floodlit Trophy
- Rugby league county cups
