= Scott Barrow (rugby) =

English rugby footballer (born 1980)

Personal information
- Born: Scott Barrow; 28 June 1980 (age 46) St Helens, Merseyside, England
- Height: 1.82 m (5 ft 11 1/2 in)
- Weight: 90 kg (14 st 2 lb)

Playing information
- Position: scrum-half, hooker
Club
| Years | Team | Pld | T | G | FG | P |
|---|---|---|---|---|---|---|
| | Blackbrook A.R.L.F.C. |
| 1997–00 | St. Helens | 23 | | | | 8 |
| | Total | 23 | 0 | 0 | 0 | 8 |
Representative
| Years | Team | Pld | T | G | FG | P |
| | Great Britain U19 |

Rugby union career
- Position: Centre
Amateur team(s)
| Years | Team | Apps | (Points) |
| 2002-03 | Worcester Warriors | | |
| 2003-04 | Orrell | | |
| 2004 | Rotherham | | |
| 2005-07 | Aberdeen GSFP RFC | | |
| 2007-08 | GHA | | |
| 2012-14 | Fylde Rugby Club | | |
Senior career
| Years | Team | Apps | (Points) |
| 2004-08 | Glasgow Warriors | 58 | (10) |
| 2008-12 | Leeds Carnegie | | |
Coaching career
- Years: Team
- 2012-: King's School, Macclesfield
- 2014-: Sandbach RUFC
- Father: Tony Barrow Sr.
- Relatives: Tony Barrow Jr. (brother); Frank Barrow (uncle)

Scott Barrow (born 28 June 1980 in St. Helens, England) is a former rugby union player and now coach. He played for Glasgow Warriors and Leeds Carnegie at the Centre position. Barrow previously also played rugby league for St.Helens and Great Britain Under 19s.

== Rugby League ==
Barrow first joined amateur rugby league side Blackbrook A.R.L.F.C. and then in 1997 he joined professional side St. Helens. He captained the Great Britain Under 19 side.

He was part of the winning St. Helens squad in the 2000 Super League Grand Final although he did not play in the match.

== Rugby Union ==
Scott then switched code to play rugby union. In 2000, he signed with Worcester Warriors then playing in National League Division One.

He then moved to Orrell after a season and a half with Worcester, at a time when Orrell's experiment with professionalism had ended.

In 2004, Barrow left Orrell to join Rotherham but unfortunately at the time due to the club's finances he had to look elsewhere to try and secure professional rugby.

In six weeks both Orrell and Rotherham had gone bust. Barrow stated that he felt he should have turned down Orrell and stayed with Worcester Warriors. However his friend Andy Craig previously of Orrell had secured a place with Glasgow Warriors and through him Scott secured a trial at the Scottish club.

=== Glasgow Warriors ===
Impressing in two pre-season games with Glasgow Warriors secured Scott a place in the provincial side. He played 4 seasons for the Warriors, being capped 58 times for the club at competitive level.

When not involved with the Warriors he played for Aberdeen GSFP RFC and Glasgow Hutchesons Aloysians.

A favourite with the Warriors fans the 'Warrior Nation' kept faith with Scott through a number of injuries. Barrow stated: "I also want to thank the fans for their support during my time here, particularly this season. The Saracens game and the Edinburgh match were great - you can't ask any more from fans - they were outstanding. We need to make it like that for every game."

=== Scotland selection dashed ===
After 4 years in Scotland Barrow exceeded the residence requirements to play for Scotland. He was called up to the Scotland A squad for the Churchill Cup in 2008. A delighted Barrow said: "I'm really made up about being in the Scotland A squad. I qualified for Scotland around August last year and I thought if I could get a few starts for Glasgow and play well I might get a chance in the A squad or Test squad."

He joined Leeds Carnegie in 2008 but this move heartbreakingly scuppered his Scotland A selection. He had just sold his house in Scotland to Warriors teammate Bernardo Stortoni and was staying in rented accommodation with Graeme Morrison in Scotland while sorting out his move south and awaiting on his Scotland A cap. However World Rugby did not accept his Scottish rented address and he thus failed on residence requirements to qualify for Scotland! Barrow stated: If I'd known about this ruling I wouldn't have sold Bernie my home until after I'd toured. But it's not to be. My hopes of playing for Scotland are dead and buried now."

=== Back to England ===
Barrow was with Leeds for four years till 2012. He helped Leeds stay in the Premiership in 2010 but the next year they were relegated; one of Barrow's worst moments. He then signed for Fylde Rugby Club till 2014.

=== Coaching ===
He has moved into coaching with King's School, Macclesfield from 2012 and also with Sandbach RUFC from 2014.
