= Anthony Thackeray =

English rugby league footballer

Anthony "Thacks" Thackeray
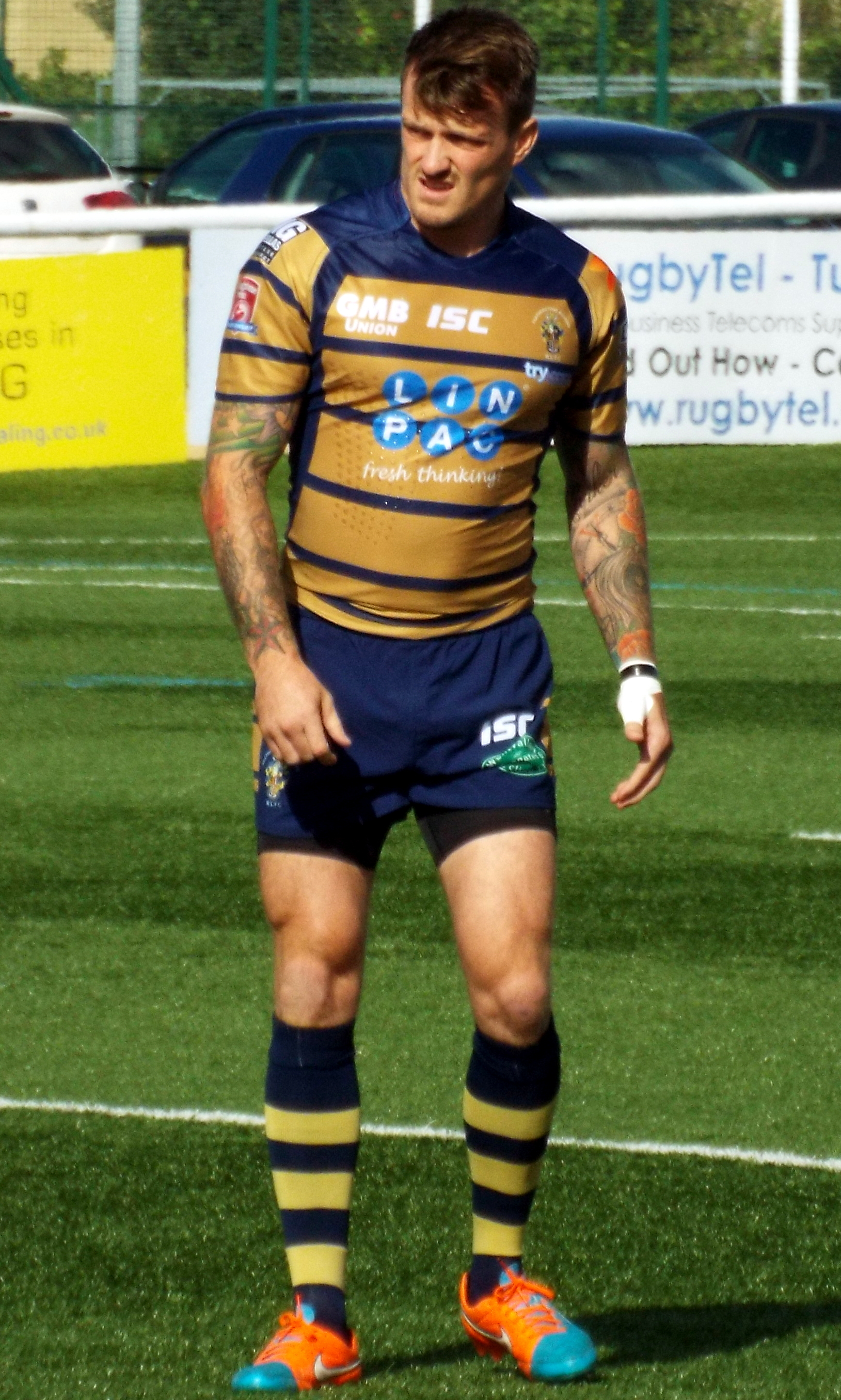

Personal information
- Full name: Anthony Thackeray
- Born: 19 February 1986 (age 40) Hull, East Riding of Yorkshire, England

Playing information
- Height: 5 ft 10 in (1.77 m)
- Weight: 13 st 10 lb (87 kg)
- Position: Stand-off, Scrum-half, Hooker, Fullback
Club
Years	Team	Pld	T	G	FG	P
2007	Hull F.C.	2	0	1	0	2
2007–08	Castleford Tigers	19	8	0	0	32
2008–11	Widnes Vikings	69	47	1	0	190
2011(loan)	→ York City Knights	14	5	0	0	20
2012–13	Halifax	53	36	0	0	144
2014–15	Dewsbury Rams	59	40	0	5	165
2016–18	Featherstone Rovers	80	37	0	5	153
2019–24	Sheffield Eagles	53	31	0	1	124
	Total	349	204	2	11	830

Anthony Thackeray (born 19 February 1986) is an English former professional rugby league player who played as a stand-off or scrum-half.

He has also played at club level for Hull FC, Castleford, Widnes (two spells), York City Knights, Halifax, Dewsbury Rams and Featherstone Rovers. In 2019 he helped the Eagles to win the inaugural 1895 Cup as they defeated Widnes Vikings 36–18 in the final; Thackeray scored a try following a 60-yard run and was presented with the Ray French Award for Man of the Match.

== Background ==
Thackeray was born in Hull, East Riding of Yorkshire, England.
