= Tommy Bishop =

English rugby league coach and former GB international rugby league footballer

Personal information
- Full name: Thomas Bishop
- Born: 15 October 1940 (age 85) St Helens, Lancashire, England

Playing information
- Height: 5 ft 2 in (157 cm)
- Position: Scrum-half
Club
Years	Team	Pld	T	G	FG	P
1959–64	Blackpool Borough	166	56	4	0	176
1964–66	Barrow	39	8	0	0	24
1966–69	St Helens	135	47	17	0	175
1969–73	Cronulla Sharks	60	21	0	2	66
1974–76	Northern Suburbs
	Total	400	132	21	2	441
Representative
Years	Team	Pld	T	G	FG	P
1966–69	Great Britain	15	1	3	0	9
1966	GB tour games	10	3	0	0	9
1966–68	Lancashire	5	2	0	0	6

Coaching information
Club
Years	Team	Gms	W	D	L	W%
1970–73	Cronulla Sharks	92	46	0	46	50
1974–76	Northern Suburbs	71	39	1	31	55
1979	North Sydney	22	2	0	20	9
1980	Cronulla Sharks	22	9	2	11	41
1980–82	Workington Town	58	36	1	21	62
1983–84	Leigh	30	14	0	16	47
1985	Barrow Raiders	11	3	1	7	27
	Total	306	149	5	152	49
- Relatives: Paul Bishop (son)

Thomas Bishop (born 15 October 1940) is an English former professional rugby league footballer who played in the 1960s and 1970s, and coached in the 1970s and 1980s. He played for Blackpool Borough, Barrow and St Helens in the English Championship, and the Cronulla-Sutherland Sharks in the New South Wales Rugby League competition in Australia. He also represented Great Britain on several occasions during his career, captaining them on two occasions, his position of choice was as a scrum-half.

Now long retired from competitive rugby league, Bishop now resides at Redcliffe, Queensland, Australia.

== Background ==
Bishop was born in St Helens, Lancashire, England.

== Career ==
=== English club career ===
Tommy Bishop started his professional rugby league playing career at Blackpool Borough where he became club captain, and Player of the Year before being transferred to Barrow, and then onto St. Helens, where he played from the January of the 1965–66 season until the end of the 1968–69 season.

Bishop played scrum-half in St Helens' 35–12 victory over Halifax in the Championship Final during the 1965–66 season at Station Road, Swinton on Saturday 28 May 1966, in front of a crowd of 30,165.

Bishop played scrum-half and scored a try in St Helens' 21–2 victory over Wigan in the 1965–66 Challenge Cup Final during the 1965–66 season at Wembley Stadium, London on Saturday 21 May 1966, in front of a crowd of 98,536.

Bishop played scrum-half in St Helens' 2–2 draw with Warrington in the 1967–68 Lancashire Cup Final during the 1967–68 season at Central Park, Wigan on Saturday 7 October 1967, played scrum-half in the 13–10 victory over Warrington in the 1967–68 Lancashire Cup Final replay during the 1967–68 season at Station Road, Swinton on Saturday 2 December 1967, and played scrum-half, and scored a try in the 30–2 victory over Oldham in the 1968–69 Lancashire Cup Final during the 1968–69 season at Central Park, Wigan on Friday 25 October 1968.

Bishop played scrum-half in St Helens' 4–7 defeat by Wigan in the 1968–69 BBC2 Floodlit Trophy Final during the 1968–69 season at Central Park, Wigan on Tuesday 17 December 1968.

=== Cronulla ===
Bishop was brought in by the Cronulla-Sutherland Sharks for the next few seasons (1969-73). In that era it was fairly normal for Australian clubs to bring in British internationals. Upon Cronulla coach Ken Kearney leaving in the 1970 season, Bishop was offered and accepted the role of player-coach for his remaining time at the Sharks. Bishop's first match as coach in 1970 provided a 23–13 win over Newtown at Endeavour, but the club lost their next seven consecutive matches. Then out of the blue, came one of the greatest wins in the club's history. The Sharks thrashed the premiership bound South Sydney 25–6 with a style of open football that was soon to become the club's famous trademark.

In 1971 Bishop helped the Cronulla side secure Great Britain power front rower Cliff Watson, and the club had their best season in of their history, winning a total of ten matches. Cronulla finished the season one win from the play-offs and that result most likely would have been even better, had it not been for Bishop succumbing to injury snapping his achilles tendon. This meant Bishop would not return to playing for Cronulla until the first match of the 1973 season. In the 1972 season Cronulla won eight of 22 games and languished in the lower half of the table, which just shows how much of a key Bishop was to their side.

The year 1973 saw Bishop's Cronulla side make the end of season play-offs for the first time in the club's history and they did it in style. Cronulla-Sutherland lost only five games in the whole home-and-away season and finished just one point behind eventual Minor Premiers Manly, and ahead of local rivals St George.

Cronulla being drawn against the Dragons defeated them surprisingly comfortably 18–0 in their first ever semi-final with the help of Bishop, Watson and Rogers. Bishop's Sharks lost to Manly leaving them having to achieve a win over Jack Gibson's Newtown to achieve the club's first Grand Final appearance. Cronulla established a crushing 18–4 half time lead over the Newtown side, before eventually winning 20–11. Cronulla were into the Grand Final in their first visit to the play-offs.

In the 1973 Grand Final, Cronulla-Sutherland faced defending premiers Manly with a team that included several young players. Cliff Watson played a prominent role for Cronulla, while Bobby Fulton contributed to Manly’s 10–7 victory.

In 2005 Bishop was made an immortal of the Cronulla-Sutherland Sharks.

=== Latter years ===
After the 1973 season, Bishop was embroiled in a contractual dispute with the financially crippled Sharks, and he moved to captain-coach Northern Suburbs in the Brisbane competition. In the 1974 season the Devils were minor premiers but lost the major semi-final to Valleys and the preliminary final to Brothers. In 1975 the Devils finished second after the home-and away season but again failed in the finals, losing the major semi to Western Suburbs and the preliminary to Redcliffe. In 1976, Norths fell to last and Bishop was replaced by former “master coach” Bob Bax.

=== Non-playing coach ===
For the 1978 season, Bishop was appointed coach of Illawarra in the New South Wales Country Championships, which was contested between the various leagues of the Country Rugby League. After he coached Illawarra to an undefeated record and the Amco Cup quarter-finals, Bishop received offers to coach Parramatta, North Sydney as well as to continue with his job in the Country Championships. Bishop soon declined the offer to coach Parramatta because he did not accept the degree of control he expected to gain over the team, and on 13 July accepted a contract to coach the Bears for the next three seasons. At the time the Bears had not reached the finals since 1965, but it was thought Bishop's experience in England might help bring the players to make the club competitive after having won only one game in the 1978 season when he was appointed and lacking the wealth to compete for the best players.

Bishop's move to North Sydney proved a disaster from the beginning when they lost all five pre-season encounters including a 13–17 loss to a Port Kembla team. Early in the season it was clear he was not lifting the team despite persevering with players he had hoped to build into a formidable combination before the pre-season started. For the entire 1979 season the Bears won just two games for their worst record since 1919.

On 9 August, with three games remaining, Bishop resigned as coach of the Bears. After the season he said that they were not terrible rugby league players but that they had forgotten how to win. Initially after leaving the Bears it was though Bishop would not coach in 1980, but after the resignation of Norm Provan, Bishop was appointed as non-playing coach of his former club Cronulla in September 1979. The Sharks had finished in the top three in 1978 and 1979, but Bishop's return proved another personal disaster as his Shark team finished ninth in a twelve-team competition after a strong start. Despite this, Bishop was initially re-appointed for the 1981 season, but when he refused to talk to the club after the season finished the club announced they would sever ties with him.

Bishop, who had established himself in Australia ever since he joined Cronulla as a player, returned to England after this double setback and coached several British rugby league teams between 1980 and 1985.

== Career playing statistics ==
=== Point scoring summary ===
Games	Tries	Goals	D/G	Points
195	68	17	2	241

=== Matches played ===
Team	Matches	Years
St Helens	135	1966-69
Cronulla Sharks	23	1969-71, 1973
