= Frank Barrow =

English rugby league footballer (1943–2026)

Personal information
- Born: 11 January 1943 St Helens, Lancashire, England
- Died: 22 July 2026 (aged 83)

Playing information
- Position: Fullback
Club
Years	Team	Pld	T	G	FG	P
1961–1972	St Helens	244	13	3	0	45
1972–1974	Leigh	64	4	0	0	12
	Total	308	17	3	0	57
Representative
Years	Team	Pld	T	G	FG	P
1967	Lancashire	2	0	0	0	0

Coaching information
Club
Years	Team	Gms	W	D	L	W%
1984	Oldham	1	0	0	1	0
1987–1989	Swinton	29	7	1	21	24
	Total	30	7	1	22	23
- Relatives: Tony Barrow Jr. (nephew); Scott Barrow (nephew); Tony Barrow (brother)

Frank Barrow (11 January 1943 – 22 July 2026) was an English professional rugby league footballer and coach who played as a fullback. He played for St Helens and Leigh, and also represented Lancashire. As a coach, he took charge of Oldham and Swinton.

== Playing career ==
=== St Helens ===
Barrow was born and grew up in Thatto Heath, St Helens. He joined his hometown professional rugby league club St Helens, making his debut in January 1961. During his early career, he mostly played in the 'A' team, but made occasionally first team appearances deputising for Welsh international Kel Coslett at fullback.

He became a regular first team player, following an injury to Coslett early in the 1964–65 season, and won his first silverware with the club playing in St Helens' 12–4 win over Swinton in the 1964–65 Lancashire Cup final. Barrow retained his place in the team when Coslett recovered from injury, with the latter eventually transitioning to play at loose forward.

Barrow was a part of St Helens' successful team in the 1965–66 season which won four trophies, playing at fullback in their 35–12 against Halifax in the Championship final, and also their 21–2 victory over rivals Wigan in the 1965–66 Challenge Cup final.

He won a second Lancashire Cup medal in 1967–68 against Warrington, and a second Championship in 1969–70 against Leeds.

=== Leigh ===
Barrow joined Leigh in 1972, where he played as a second-row. He helped the club win 1972–73 BBC2 Floodlit Trophy against Widnes.

== Coaching career ==
Barrow moved into coaching, and founded the amateur club Thatto Heath in 1981.

He had a brief coaching spell at Oldham before later joining Swinton, and was coach when the club reached the 1988–89 Divisional Premiership final. He resigned at the end of the season in order to re-join St Helens as an assistant coach to Alex Murphy.

Following the departure of Murphy, Barrow remained at St Helens as an assistant under new head coach Mike McClennan. He was also an assistant coach under McClennan for Tonga at the 1995 Rugby League World Cup.

In 2005, he was inducted into St Helens' Hall of Fame.

== Personal life and death ==
Frank Barrow's brothers, Tony and Billy, also played professional rugby league for St Helens. Frank Barrow died on 22 July 2026, aged 83.
