= Tattersfield =

Tattersfield is a surname. Notable people with the surname include:

- Christian Tattersfield (fl. from 1990), British businessman
- Ted Tattersfield (1912–1991), English rugby player
