= Tony Barrow (rugby league, born 1971) =

English rugby league footballer

Tony Barrow Jr.
Personal information
- Full name: Anthony Francis Barrow
- Born: 19 October 1971 St Helens, England
- Died: 16 March 2017 (aged 45)

Playing information
- Position: Loose forward
Club
Years	Team	Pld	T	G	FG	P
1990–91	Oldham	6	0	0	0	0
1992–01	Swinton Lions	243	25	0	0	100
	Total	249	25	0	0	100

Coaching information
Club
Years	Team	Gms	W	D	L	W%
2002	Swinton Lions	11	1	0	10	9
- Father: Tony Barrow Sr.
- Relatives: Scott Barrow (brother); Frank Barrow (uncle)

Anthony Francis Barrow (19 October 1971 – 16 March 2017) was an English rugby league footballer who played for Oldham RLFC and Swinton Lions.

Following his retirement in 2001, Barrow became a personal trainer.

Barrow was the son of Tony Barrow, Sr. who played for St. Helens and Leigh in the 1960s, and 1970s.

He died aged 45 of cancer.
