= Cliff Watson =

English international rugby league footballer

Personal information
- Full name: Clifford H. Watson
- Born: 26 April 1940 Stepney, London, England
- Died: 2 May 2018 (aged 78) Cronulla, New South Wales, Australia

Playing information
- Height: 5 ft 11 in (1.80 m)
- Position: Prop
Club
Years	Team	Pld	T	G	FG	P
1960–71	St. Helens	373	57			171
1971–73	Cronulla-Sutherland	39	9			27
	Total	412	66	0	0	198
Representative
Years	Team	Pld	T	G	FG	P
1963–70	Great Britain	7	1	0	0	3
1969–70	England	4	2	0	0	6
1974	Illawarra Firsts	1	0	0	0	0

Clifford H. Watson (26 April 1940 – 2 May 2018) was an English professional rugby league footballer who played as a prop in the 1960s and 1970s. He played for the St Helens in the Rugby Football League Championship, and later the Cronulla-Sutherland Sharks in the New South Wales Rugby League premiership in Australia. Along with hardman Ken Gee, and legendary captain Alan Prescott, he remains one of the best Great Britain front-rowers ever.

Watson originally played amateur rugby union in England for Dudley Kingswinford in Staffordshire competition before answering a St. Helens club advertisement for "top class Rugby Union forwards". A trial was arranged and in 1960 he was signed to the club for £750 initially and then a further £750 after he had completed six first grade games for the club. However his career first started to gain momentum after the 1961 Rugby League Challenge Cup Final against Wigan; in front of 95,000 fans Watson's defence was instrumental in helping his club gain a 12–6 victory over their rivals and helped keep Cliff a permanent fixture in the team line-up for the next ten years.

After playing out eleven seasons for St. Helens, Watson moved to Australia and signed on to the Cronulla-Sutherland Sharks with fellow Great Britain, and St. Helens teammate Tommy Bishop. In his three seasons at the club Watson made an impact in leading a young and inexperienced pack of forwards always by example. His presence along with that of Bishop undoubtedly helped the young Cronulla club to its maiden grand-final in 1973.

Watson also went on to represent Great Britain on thirty occasions becoming known for his physical, tough and all-round fearless style of play. He played for the British between 1963 and 1970 often striking fear into opponents. He retired from first grade and international rugby league altogether after the 1973 season.

== Childhood and early career ==
Clifford Watson was born into a working class family in Central London on 26 April 1940; he grew up playing both codes of rugby but slowly began to steer himself toward the amateur game of the day in rugby union. At the early age of seventeen Watson trialled for Dudley Kingswinford rugby union football club where he was quickly signed and placed into the first team at second-row, quickly displaying his natural ability by cementing a regular place in the squad at such a young age.

His career continued to grow in stature when within a year of signing for Dudley Kingswinford, Watson was selected for his first representative role with the Worcestershire and Herefordshire Combined Counties side and playing on several occasions in a new role of prop-forward.

At the end of the 1959 season Watson decided on a switch of codes after wanting to forge a career in rugby league. After viewing an advertisement listed in the Sporting Chronicle by St. Helens offering trials for 'top class Rugby Union forwards', Watson replied offering his services to the club and outlining his statistics and credentials he had accomplished in rugby union. St. Helens quickly replied and a trial was organised for 2 August after which Watson was signed to a six-game contract worth £1,500.

== St. Helens ==
He made his début for the Lancashire club on 15 August 1960 playing at prop-forward in what turned out to be a defeat by local rivals Liverpool City at home. However he quickly adjusted to the new game, slowly establishing himself and garnering a reputation as a tough, resilient and hard working player amongst fellow professionals and spectators alike something which never did never change throughout his career.

Watson played out the six matches as per terms on his original contract and quickly re-signed for the club establishing himself further with each passing game played. After a mere eleven competitive matches for his new club Watson shot to fame in the 1961 Rugby League Challenge Cup Final against Wigan with his quick thinking and often vital defence; although it took Watson a further seven matches to garner his maiden first grade point against Barrow on 23 September 1961.

After the Challenge Cup Final Watson became a regular first team member of the Saints side of the 1960s. Watson tasted further success in 1961 with a Charity Cup victory in 1961.

His career continued to flourish for St. Helens during the rest of the 1960s being first selected for Great Britain in 1963 and winning the Western division Championship in 1963; the Gallie Cup in 1964, 1967, 1968, 1969 and 1970; the Championship trophy in 1966 and a further Challenge Cup in 1966.

Watson played his 373rd and last match for St. Helens in England on 7 May 1971 against Leeds before being enticed to sign with newly formed Australian club the Cronulla-Sutherland Sharks by ex-teammate and present Sharks player-coach Tommy Bishop.

=== Championship final appearances ===
Cliff Watson played right-prop in St. Helens' 35–12 victory over Halifax in the Championship Final during the 1965–66 season at Station Road, Swinton on Saturday 28 May 1966, in front of a crowd of 30,165.

=== Challenge Cup Final appearances ===
Cliff Watson played right-prop in St. Helens' 12–6 victory over Wigan in the 1961 Challenge Cup Final during the 1960–61 season at Wembley Stadium, London on Saturday 13 May 1961, in front of a crowd of 94,672, and played right-prop in the 21–2 victory over Wigan in the 1966 Challenge Cup Final during the 1965–66 season at Wembley Stadium, London on Saturday 21 May 1966, in front of a crowd of 98,536.

=== County Cup Final appearances ===
Cliff Watson played right-prop in St. Helens 25–9 victory over Swinton in the 1961 Lancashire Cup Final during the 1961–62 season at Central Park, Wigan on Saturday 11 November 1961, played right-prop in the 7–4 victory over Swinton in the 1962 Lancashire Cup Final during the 1962–62 season at Central Park, Wigan on Saturday 27 October 1962, played right-prop in the 15–4 victory over Leigh in the 1963 Lancashire Cup Final during the 1963–64 season at Station Road, Swinton on Saturday 26 October 1963, was a substitute in the 12–4 victory over Swinton in the 1964 Lancashire Cup Final during the 1964–65 season at Central Park, Wigan on Saturday 24 October 1964, played right-prop in the 2–2 draw with Warrington in the 1967 Lancashire Cup Final during the 1967–68 season at Central Park, Wigan on Saturday 7 October 1967, played right-prop in the 13–10 victory over Warrington in the 1967 Lancashire Cup Final replay during the 1967–68 season at Station Road, Swinton on Saturday 2 December 1967, and played right-prop in the 30–2 victory over Oldham in the 1968 Lancashire Cup Final during the 1968–69 season at Central Park, Wigan on Friday 25 October 1968.

=== BBC2 Floodlit Trophy Final appearances ===
Cliff Watson played right-prop in St. Helens' 0–4 defeat by Castleford in the 1965 BBC2 Floodlit Trophy Final during the 1965-66 season at Knowsley Road, St. Helens on Tuesday 14 December 1965, and played right-prop in the 4–7 defeat by Wigan in the 1968 BBC2 Floodlit Trophy Final during the 1968-69 season at Central Park, Wigan on Tuesday 17 December 1968.

== Cronulla-Sutherland Sharks ==
After making his way to the New South Wales Rugby League competition with the Cronulla-Sutherland Sharks, the now international veteran immediately assumed the role of leader in a young and inexperienced forward pack.

Slowly but surely his lead by example attitude and influence took effect. After success had passed the Sharks by for the 1971 and 1972 seasons, hard work paid off in 1973 with the team making their maiden Grand Final appearance. Watson toiled long and hard throughout the length of the match but premiership success was to elude him at the Sharks.

At the beginning of the 1974 competition, Watson did not come to terms with the financially struggling club and decided to play in the lower grades, seeing out the remainder of his career with Wollongong Souths in the Illawarra competition. In 1974, Watson was selected to play for and captain Illawarra Firsts in their game against the touring Great Britain Lions. The Illawarra side was coached by Australian rugby league legend and future (2018) rugby league Immortal Norm Provan. Played in front of over 8,000 fans at the Wollongong Showground, Illawarra pushed the Great Britain side, eventually only going down by the score of 22–26.

In 1979, he returned to Sydney to coach the North Sydney Bears reserve grade team.

== Great Britain ==
Cliff made his international début against the touring Australian Kangaroo side in 1963 and immediately struck fear into the hearts of all the touring players with his rugged, aggressive and often unpredictable style of play. This was seen on more than one occasion such as when he introduced the Australian players and viewing public to the infamous "Liverpool kiss" in a Brisbane test match on Jim Morgan (according to Watson the two shook hands after the match and ended up as good friends). Watson holds the dubious record of being the only British player to be sent off twice against Australia.

Watson featured in another three British tours in 1966, 1967 and 1970. He made a sole World Cup appearance in 1970.

== Career playing statistics ==
=== Point scoring summary ===
Games	Tries	Goals	D/G	Points
412	66	-	-	264

=== Matches played ===
Team	Matches	Years
St. Helens	373	1960–1971
Cronulla-Sutherland Sharks	39	1971–1973
Great Britain	30	1963–1970

== Death ==
Watson died of cancer, aged 78, on 2 May 2018.
