= Len Killeen =

South African rugby league & union footballer

Personal information
- Full name: Leonard Michael Anthony Killeen
- Born: 19 November 1938 Port Elizabeth, South Africa
- Died: 31 October 2011 (aged 72) Port Elizabeth, South Africa

Playing information
- Height: 5 ft 11 in (180 cm)
- Weight: 13 st 0 lb (83 kg)
- Position: Wing
Club
Years	Team	Pld	T	G	FG	P
1962–67	St. Helens	187	115	408	0	1161
1968–71	Balmain	86	38	285	8	700
1972	Penrith	8	2	15	0	36
	Total	281	155	708	8	1897

Leonard Michael Anthony "Len"/"Lenny The Lion" Killeen (19 November 1938 – 31 October 2011) was a South African basketball player, rugby union and rugby league footballer who played in the 1960s and 1970s.

Killeen was born in Port Elizabeth, Eastern Cape, and played rugby union for Uitenhage RFC (in Uitenhage). A goal-kicking wing, he played rugby league in England for St. Helens, with whom he won the Challenge Cup in 1966. Killeen also played in Australia for the Balmain, winning the NSWRFL premiership with them in 1969 and becoming the club's all-time top point-scorer.

== Playing career ==
=== Championship final appearances ===
Len Killeen played on the wing and scored 3-tries and 6-conversions in St. Helens' 35–12 victory over Halifax in the Championship Final during the 1965–66 season at Station Road, Swinton on Saturday 28 May 1966, in front of a crowd of 30,165.

=== Challenge Cup Final appearances ===
Len Killeen played on the wing scored a try and 5-conversions, and was man of the match winning the Lance Todd Trophy in St. Helens' 21–2 victory over Wigan in the 1966 Challenge Cup Final during the 1965–66 season at Wembley Stadium, London on Saturday 21 May 1966, in front of a crowd of 98,536.

=== County Cup Final appearances ===
Len Killeen played on the wing and scored a try in St. Helens' 15–4 victory over Leigh in the 1963 Lancashire Cup Final during the 1963–64 season at Station Road, Swinton on Saturday 26 October 1963, and played on the wing and scored 3-conversions in the 12–4 victory over Swinton in the 1964 Lancashire Cup Final during the 1964–65 season at Central Park, Wigan on Saturday 24 October 1964.

=== BBC2 Floodlit Trophy Final appearances ===
Len Killeen played on the wing in St. Helens' 0–4 defeat by Castleford in the 1965 BBC2 Floodlit Trophy Final during the 1965–66 season at Knowsley Road, St. Helens on Tuesday 14 December 1965.
