= John Warlow =

Great Britain and Wales international dual-code rugby footballer

Personal information
- Full name: Douglas John Warlow
- Born: 13 February 1939 (age 87) Dafen, Carmarthenshire, Wales

Playing information
- Height: 6 ft 1 in (185 cm)
- Weight: 15 st 0 lb (95 kg)

Rugby union
- Position: Prop
Club
Years	Team	Pld	T	G	FG	P
	Felinfoel RFC
≤1962–63	Llanelli RFC
	Total	0	0	0	0	0
Representative
Years	Team	Pld	T	G	FG	P
1962	Wales	1	0	0	0	0

Rugby league
- Position: Prop, Second-row
Club
Years	Team	Pld	T	G	FG	P
1963–69	St. Helens	203	25	0	0	75
1969–73	Widnes	133	2	1
1973–75	St. Helens	42	2	0	0	6
1975–≥75	Rochdale Hornets
	Total	378	29	1	0	81
Representative
Years	Team	Pld	T	G	FG	P
1964–71	Great Britain	7	0	0	0	0
1968–70	Wales	3	0	0	0	0

Douglas John Warlow (born 13 February 1939) is a Welsh former dual-code international rugby union, and professional rugby league footballer who played in the 1960s and 1970s. He played representative level rugby union (RU) for Wales, and at club level for Felinfoel RFC and Llanelli RFC, as a prop, and representative level rugby league (RL) for Great Britain, and at club level for St. Helens (two spells), Widnes and the Rochdale Hornets, as a prop or second-row.

== Background ==
Warlow was born in Dafen, Carmarthenshire, Wales.

== Playing career ==
=== International honours ===
John Warlow won a cap for Wales (RU) while at Llanelli RFC in 1962 against Ireland, and won caps for Great Britain (RL) while at St. Helens in 1964 against France, in the 1968 Rugby League World Cup against New Zealand, and France, and while at Widnes in 1971 against France (two matches), and New Zealand.

=== Championship final appearances ===
John Warlow played right-second-row in St. Helens' 35-12 victory over Halifax in the Championship Final during the 1965–66 season at Station Road, Swinton on Saturday 28 May 1966, in front of a crowd of 30,165.

=== Challenge Cup Final appearances ===
John Warlow played right-second-row in St. Helens' 21-2 victory over Wigan in the 1966 Challenge Cup Final during the 1965–66 season at Wembley Stadium, London on Saturday 21 May 1966, in front of a crowd of 98,536.

=== County Cup Final appearances ===
John Warlow played right-prop in St. Helens' 12-4 victory over Swinton in the 1964 Lancashire Cup Final during the 1964–65 season at Central Park, Wigan on Saturday 24 October 1964, played left-prop in the 2-2 draw with Warrington in the 1967 Lancashire Cup Final during the 1967–68 season at Central Park, Wigan on Saturday 7 October 1967, played left-prop, and scored a try in the 13-10 victory over Warrington in the 1967 Lancashire Cup Final replay during the 1967–68 season at Station Road, Swinton on Saturday 2 December 1967, played left-prop in the 30-2 victory over Oldham in the 1968 Lancashire Cup Final during the 1968–69 season at Central Park, Wigan on Friday 25 October 1968, and played left-prop in Widnes 8-15 defeat by Wigan in the 1971 Lancashire Cup Final during the 1970–71 season at Knowsley Road, St. Helens on Saturday 28 August 1971.

=== BBC2 Floodlit Trophy Final appearances ===
John Warlow played left-prop in St. Helens' 4-7 defeat by Wigan in the 1968 BBC2 Floodlit Trophy Final during the 1968-69 season at Central Park, Wigan on Tuesday 17 December 1968, and played right-prop in Widnes' 0-5 defeat by Leigh in the 1972 BBC2 Floodlit Trophy Final during the 1972-73 season at Central Park, Wigan on Tuesday 19 December 1972.

== Honoured at St Helens RFC ==
John Warlow is a St Helens RFC Hall of Fame inductee.
