= Tony Barrow (rugby league, born 1944) =

English rugby league coach and former rugby league footballer

Personal information
- Full name: Anthony Barrow
- Born: 6 April 1944 (age 81) St. Helens, Lancashire, England

Playing information
- Position: Wing, Centre, Stand-off
Club
Years	Team	Pld	T	G	FG	P
1963–70	St. Helens	114	38	0	0	114
1970–73	Leigh	106	24	0	0	72
	Total	220	62	0	0	186

Coaching information
Club
Years	Team	Gms	W	D	L	W%
1986–88	Warrington	109	68	4	37	62
1988–90	Oldham	79	51	0	28	65
1993–95	Swinton	133	52	0	81	39
2002	Swinton
	Total	321	171	4	146	53
- Source: As of 11 June 2020
- Relatives: Tony Barrow Jr. (son); Scott Barrow (son); Frank Barrow (brother)

Anthony Barrow (born 6 April 1944) is an English former professional rugby league footballer who played in the 1960s and 1970s, and coached in the 1980s and 1990s. He played at club level for St Helens and Leigh, as a wing, centre, or stand-off, and coached at club level for Warrington, Oldham and Swinton.

== Playing career ==
=== St Helens ===
Barrow played in St. Helens' victories in the Lancashire League during the 1963–64 season, 1964–65 season, 1965–66 season, 1966–67 season and 1968–69 season.

Barrow was a non-playing substitute in St. Helens' 12-4 victory Swinton in the 1964 Lancashire Cup Final during the 1964–65 season at Central Park, Wigan on Saturday 24 October 1964.

Barrow was an unused substitute in St. Helens' 21-2 victory over Wigan in the 1966 Challenge Cup Final during the 1965–66 season at Wembley Stadium, London on Saturday 21 May 1966, in front of a crowd of 98,536.

Barrow played on the wing and scored a try in St. Helens' 35-12 victory over Halifax in the Championship Final during the 1965–66 season at Station Road, Swinton on Saturday 28 May 1966, in front of a crowd of 30,165.

=== Leigh ===
He played stand-off in Leigh's 24-7 victory over Leeds in the 1971 Challenge Cup Final during the 1970–71 season at Wembley Stadium, London on Saturday 15 May 1971, in front of a crowd of 85,514.

His playing career was cut short when he broke his leg in a play-off match against former club St Helens in April 1973.
