= Ray French =

English rugby player and commentator (1939–2025)

Ray French MBE
Personal information
- Full name: Raymond James French
- Born: 23 December 1939 St Helens, Lancashire, England
- Died: 26 July 2025 (aged 85)

Playing information

Rugby union
Club
Years	Team	Pld	T	G	FG	P
–1961	St Helens RUFC
Representative
Years	Team	Pld	T	G	FG	P
1961	England	4	0	0	0	0

Rugby league
- Position: Second-row
Club
Years	Team	Pld	T	G	FG	P
1961–67	St. Helens	204	10	0	0	30
1967–71	Widnes	123	6	0	0	18
	Total	327	16	0	0	48
Representative
Years	Team	Pld	T	G	FG	P
1968	Great Britain	4	0	0	0	0
196?	Lancashire		0	0	0	0

Raymond James French (23 December 1939 – 26 July 2025) was an English rugby league and rugby union player who played in the 1950s and 1960s, and a rugby league commentator. French played at international level in both codes. He won four caps for England in rugby union in 1961 as a second row forward, then moved to rugby league as a second-row and played for his home town club, St. Helens, and for Widnes.

French was a commentator for the BBC on rugby league on television and radio, beginning his television career in 1981 following the retirement of Eddie Waring. He was regularly heard on the rugby league show Try Time each Thursday on BBC Radio Merseyside. He retired in 2019.

In 2010, French received the Mike Gregory Spirit of Rugby League Award to mark his contribution to the game. He was appointed Member of the Order of the British Empire (MBE) in the 2011 New Year Honours for services to rugby league.

== Background ==
French was born in St Helens, Lancashire, England on 23 December 1939. After studying at Leeds University and training as a school teacher, he taught at Cowley School in St. Helens.

== Playing career ==
=== Championship final appearances ===
French played left-second-row in St. Helens' 35–12 victory over Halifax in the Championship Final during the 1965–66 season at Station Road, Swinton on Saturday 28 May 1966, in front of a crowd of 30,165.

=== Challenge Cup Final appearances ===
French played left-second-row in St. Helens' 21–2 victory over Wigan in the 1966 Challenge Cup Final during the 1965–66 season at Wembley Stadium, London on Saturday 21 May 1966, in front of a crowd of 98,536.

=== County Cup Final appearances ===
French played right-second-row in St. Helens' 25–9 victory over Swinton in the 1961 Lancashire Cup Final at Central Park, Wigan on Saturday 11 November 1961; played left-second-row in the 15–4 victory over Leigh in the 1963 Lancashire Cup Final at Station Road, Swinton on Saturday 26 October 1963, and played left-second-row in the 12–4 victory over Swinton in the 1964 Lancashire Cup Final at Central Park, Wigan on Saturday 24 October 1964.

=== BBC2 Floodlit Trophy Final appearances ===
French played left-prop in St. Helens' 0–4 defeat by Castleford in the 1965 BBC2 Floodlit Trophy Final at Knowsley Road, St. Helens on Tuesday 14 December 1965.

== Ray French Award ==
In August 2019 the Rugby Football League ran a poll among fans on the Our League app to name a trophy for the man of the match award in the 1895 Cup Final. French was one of three names in the poll along with Willie Horne and Johnny Whiteley. French won the poll with over 60% of the votes cast and presented the award at the inaugural final on 24 August 2019 to Sheffield's Anthony Thackeray.

== Illness and death ==
French died from complications of dementia on 26 July 2025, aged 85.
