= 1965–66 Northern Rugby Football League season =

1965–66 Rugby Football League season
- League: Northern Rugby Football League
- Champions: St. Helens
- League Leaders: St. Helens
- Top point-scorer: Len Killeen 336
- Top try-scorer(s): Len Killeen 32; Trevor Lake 32

The 1965–66 Rugby Football League season was the 71st season of rugby league football. A three-way county championship was also held, with comparative minnows Cumberland against Yorkshire and Lancashire.

== Rule change ==
- The substitutes rule introduced in the previous season changed so that substitutions could be used for any reason, including tactical reasons, although they were still only allowed up to and including half-time.

== Season summary ==
The BBC2 Floodlit Trophy competition was launched in this season with the BBC televising matches on Tuesday nights. The competition was used to trial the four-tackle rule, an experiment in ending the unlimited tackles that had been a by-product from the introduction of the play-the-ball in 1906.

St. Helens finished the regular season as league leaders before winning their fourth Championship when they beat Halifax 35–12 in the play-off final.

The Challenge Cup winners were St. Helens who beat Wigan 21–2 in the final.

St. Helens won the Lancashire League, and Wakefield Trinity won the Yorkshire League.

At the end of the season, Eric Ashton became the first Rugby League player to receive an award from Her Majesty, the Queen. He was awarded the MBE in the Queen's Birthday Honours List.

The 26-man squad for the 1966 Great Britain Lions tour was announced on 23 March 1966, with Leeds' Harry Poole named as captain, and Swinton's Ken Gowers selected as vice-captain.

== Championship ==
	Team	Pld	W	D	L	Pts
1	St. Helens	34	28	1	5	57
2	Swinton	34	27	1	6	55
3	Wigan	34	27	0	7	54
4	Wakefield Trinity	34	25	2	7	52
5	Castleford	34	23	3	8	49
6	Leeds	34	24	0	10	48
7	Bradford Northern	34	21	1	12	43
8	Workington Town	34	21	1	12	43
9	Oldham	34	20	3	11	43
10	Halifax	34	21	0	13	42
11	Huddersfield	34	20	0	14	40
12	Hull Kingston Rovers	34	20	0	14	40
13	Hull	34	20	0	14	40
14	Widnes	34	17	0	17	34
15	Featherstone Rovers	34	17	0	17	34
16	Warrington	34	16	1	17	33
17	Hunslet	34	15	2	17	32
18	Salford	34	15	1	18	31
19	Keighley	34	15	0	19	30
20	Leigh	34	14	1	19	29
21	Barrow	34	13	1	20	27
22	Bramley	34	12	2	20	26
23	York	34	11	0	23	22
24	Dewsbury	34	10	1	23	21
25	Rochdale Hornets	34	10	0	24	20
26	Liverpool City	34	9	2	23	20
27	Blackpool Borough	34	9	1	24	19
28	Batley	34	6	2	26	14
29	Doncaster	34	6	0	28	12
30	Whitehaven	34	4	2	28	10

=== Play-offs ===
Round of 16
St Helens	35
Warrington	7
Workington Town	6
Oldham	7
Castleford	10
Hull Kingston Rovers	13
Wakefield Trinity	36
Hull	6
Wigan	27
Widnes	10
Leeds	19
Huddersfield	7
Bradford Northern	7
Halifax	21
Swinton	43
Featherstone Rovers	2

Quarter-finals
St Helens	15
Oldham	10
Hull Kingston Rovers	10
Wakefield Trinity	9
Wigan	22
Leeds	5
Halifax	33
Swinton	2

Semi-finals
St Helens	14
Hull Kingston Rovers	6
Wigan	12
Halifax	25

Final
St Helens	35
Halifax	12

==== Final ====
The 1966 Championship Final was played between Halifax and St. Helens on Saturday, 28 May 1966 at Station Road Ground before a crowd of 30,634. St Helens won 35–12 with their hat trick-scoring prop forward, Albert Halsall being awarded the Harry Sunderland Trophy as man-of-the-match.

28 May 1966

St Helens	35 – 12	Halifax
Tries: Killeen (3), Halsall (3), A. Barrow; Goals: Killeen (6), Murphy		Tries: Baker, Fogerty; Goals: Cooper (3)

Station Road, Swinton
Attendance: 30,634
Referee: J. Manley (Warrington)
Player of the Match: Albert Halsall

St Helens	Number	Halifax
	Teams	
Frank Barrow	1	Barrie Cooper
Tony Barrow	2	Dave Jones
Alex Murphy	3	John Burnett
Billy Benyon	4	Colin Dixon
Len Killeen	5	Johnny Freeman
Peter Harvey	6	Barry Robinson
Tommy Bishop	7	Gordon Baker
Albert Halsall	8	Ken Roberts
Bill Sayer	9	Dave Harrison
Cliff Watson	10	Jack Scroby
Ray French	11	Terry Ramshaw
John Warlow	12	Terry Fogerty
John Mantle	13	Charlie Renilson
	Subs	
Bob Prosser	14	Rodney Eastwood
Jeff Hitchen (for Warlow)	15	Hugh Duffy (for Ramshaw)
Joe Coan	Coach	Albert Fearnley

== Challenge Cup ==
St Helens had reached the final by beating Wakefield Trinity 10–0 away on 26 February in round one; Swinton 16–4 at home on 19 March in round two; Hull Kingston Rovers 12–10 at home on 2 April in round three and Dewsbury 12–5 on neutral ground on 16 April in the semi-final.

Wigan had reached the final by beating Halifax 9–4 at home on 26 February in round one; Whitehaven 40–6 at home on 19 March in round two; Bradford Northern 15–6 away on 6 April in round three and Leeds 7–2 in the semi-final at Huddersfield on 23 April.

The Challenge Cup final was played at Wembley Stadium, London on 21 May 1966, in front of a crowd of 98,536. Prime Minister Harold Wilson was introduced to the players before kick-off. St Helens led 9–2 at half time and went on to defeat Wigan 21–2. Saints' scorers were John Mantle (1 try), Tommy Bishop (1 try), Len Killeen (1 try, 5 goals), and Alex Murphy (1 goal). Wigan's scorer was Laurie Gilfedder (1 goal). This was St Helens' third Cup final win in seven final appearances.

== County cups ==
Warrington beat Rochdale Hornets 16–5 to win the Lancashire Cup, and Bradford Northern beat Hunslet 17–8 to win the Yorkshire Cup.

== BBC2 Floodlit Trophy ==
The BBC2 Floodlit Trophy winners were Castleford who beat St. Helens 4–0 in the final.

== Sources ==
- Saxton, Irvin (ed.). History of Rugby League: No.71 1965–1966. League Publications.
- 1965-66 Rugby Football League season at wigan.rlfans.com
- The Challenge Cup at The Rugby Football League website
