= 1964–65 Northern Rugby Football League season =

1964–65 Rugby Football League season
- League: Championship
- Champions: Halifax
- League Leaders: St. Helens
- Top point-scorer: Len Killeen 360
- Top try-scorer: Trevor Lake 40
- Reformed: Bradford Northern

The 1964–65 Rugby Football League season was the 70th season of rugby league football.

== Rule change ==
- Substitutes were introduced. They were initially only for players injured in the time up to and including half time.

== Season summary ==
1964-65 saw the two divisions of rugby league merge back into one single league. The championship play-offs returned to decide the champions. A new top 16 play-off format was introduced rather than top four system used between 1905–06 and 1962–63. A Bottom 14 Championship was also introduced for the remaining clubs who finished below the top 16, although some clubs declined to take part.

St. Helens had finished the regular season as league leaders. Halifax won their third Championship when they beat St. Helens 15-7 in the play-off final. Terry Fogerty was awarded the Harry Sunderland Trophy as man-of-the-match.

Challenge Cup winners were Wigan who beat Hunslet 20-16 in the final.

Bradford Northern were resurrected and accepted back into the League.

St. Helens won the Lancashire League, and Castleford won the Yorkshire League.

== Championship ==
Pos	Team	Pld	W	D	L	PF	PA	PAv	Pts	Qualification
1	St Helens (L)	34	28	0	6	621	226	2.748	56	Qualification for the Championship play-offs
2	Wigan	34	26	0	8	626	260	2.408	52	Qualification for the Championship play-offs
3	Castleford	34	25	1	8	555	294	1.888	51	Qualification for the Championship play-offs
4	Wakefield Trinity	34	24	2	8	486	228	2.132	50	Qualification for the Championship play-offs
5	Warrington	34	24	1	9	416	292	1.425	49	Qualification for the Championship play-offs
6	Workington Town	34	23	1	10	497	326	1.525	47	Qualification for the Championship play-offs
7	Halifax	34	22	1	11	629	335	1.878	45	Qualification for the Championship play-offs
8	Hull Kingston Rovers	34	22	0	12	587	377	1.557	44	Qualification for the Championship play-offs
9	Oldham	34	20	1	13	444	312	1.423	41	Qualification for the Championship play-offs
10	Leeds	34	20	0	14	469	349	1.344	40	Qualification for the Championship play-offs
11	Swinton	34	19	1	14	334	250	1.336	39	Qualification for the Championship play-offs
12	Leigh	34	19	1	14	446	349	1.278	39	Qualification for the Championship play-offs
13	Hull	34	19	0	15	412	381	1.081	38	Qualification for the Championship play-offs
14	Hunslet	34	19	0	15	477	466	1.024	38	Qualification for the Championship play-offs
15	Featherstone Rovers (Note: Due to a miscalculation, some contemporary sources incorrectly published Featherstone's final league position as 16th, but the error was discovered before the play-offs took place.)	34	18	0	16	436	463	0.942	36	Qualification for the Championship play-offs
16	Barrow	34	18	0	16	383	408	0.939	36	Qualification for the Championship play-offs
17	Bradford Northern	34	15	1	18	345	347	0.994	31	Qualification for the Bottom 14 Championship
18	Huddersfield	34	15	0	19	368	419	0.878	30	Qualification for the Bottom 14 Championship
19	Widnes	34	14	2	18	348	410	0.849	30	Qualification for the Bottom 14 Championship
20	Whitehaven	34	14	1	19	308	402	0.766	29	Qualification for the Bottom 14 Championship
21	Dewsbury	34	13	2	19	298	407	0.732	28	Qualification for the Bottom 14 Championship
22	Salford	34	11	2	21	307	420	0.731	24	Qualification for the Bottom 14 Championship
23	Liverpool City	34	10	2	22	248	519	0.478	22	Qualification for the Bottom 14 Championship
24	Bramley	34	10	1	23	309	456	0.678	21	Qualification for the Bottom 14 Championship
25	York	34	10	0	24	347	535	0.649	20	Qualification for the Bottom 14 Championship
26	Batley	34	9	1	24	263	613	0.429	19	Qualification for the Bottom 14 Championship
27	Keighley	34	9	0	25	303	592	0.512	18	Qualification for the Bottom 14 Championship
28	Doncaster	34	9	0	25	296	616	0.481	18	Qualification for the Bottom 14 Championship
29	Rochdale Hornets	34	7	1	26	293	493	0.594	15	Qualification for the Bottom 14 Championship
30	Blackpool Borough	34	6	2	26	248	554	0.448	14	Qualification for the Bottom 14 Championship

(L) Won League Leader's Trophy

=== Play-offs ===
Round 1
St. Helens	23
Barrow	7
Hull Kingston Rovers	18
Oldham	14
Wakefield Trinity	15
Hull F.C.	9
Warrington	10
Leigh	4
Castleford	18
Hunslet	7
Swinton	2
Workington Town	29
Featherstone Rovers	15
Wigan	8
Halifax	28
Leeds	11

Round 2
St. Helens	24
Hull Kingston Rovers	6
Wakefield Trinity	17
Warrington	8
Castleford	11
Workington Town	3
Featherstone Rovers	6
Halifax	31

Semi-final
St. Helens	10
Wakefield Trinity	5
Castleford	18
Halifax	26

Championship final
St. Helens	7
Halifax	15

==== Final ====
22 May 1965

Halifax	15 – 7	St Helens
Tries: Burnett (2), Jackson; Goals: James (3)		Tries: Killeen; Goals: Killeen (2)

Station Road, Swinton
Attendance: 20,776
Referee: D. S. Brown (Dewsbury)
Player of the Match: Terry Fogerty

Halifax	Number	St Helens
	Teams	
Ronald James	1	Frank Barrow
Duncan Jackson	2	Peter Harvey
John Burnett	3	Tom van Vollenhoven
Alan Kellett	4	Keith Northey
Johnny Freeman	5	Len Killeen
Barry Robinson	6	Alex Murphy
Paul Daley	7	Wilf Smith
Ken Roberts	8	John Tembey
Dave Harrison	9	Bob Dagnall
Jack Scroby	10	Cliff Watson
Terry Fogerty	11	Ray French
Colin Dixon	12	John Mantle
Charlie Renilson	13	Doug Laughton
	Subs	
Bryan Todd	14	Kel Coslett
Hugh Duffy	15	John Warlow (for Tembey)
Albert Fearnley	Coach	Joe Coan

== Challenge Cup ==
Captained by player-coach Eric Ashton, Wigan beat Hunslet 20–16 in the final played at Wembley in front of a crowd of 89,016.

This was Wigan’s seventh Cup Final win in thirteen Final appearances.

To date, this was Hunslet’s last Challenge Cup Final appearance.

== County cups ==
St Helens beat Swinton 12–4 to win the Lancashire Cup, and Wakefield Trinity beat Leeds 18–2 to win the Yorkshire Cup.

== Sources ==
- Saxton, Irvin (ed.). History of Rugby League: No.70 1964–1965. League Publications.
- 1964-65 Rugby Football League season at wigan.rlfans.com
- The Challenge Cup at The Rugby Football League website
