= 1968 Challenge Cup final =

Rugby league match in England

1968 Challenge Cup Final
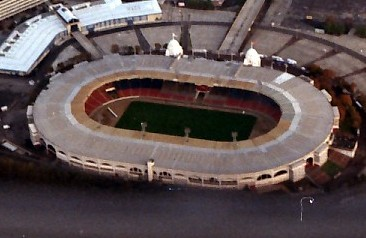
- The final took place at Wembley Stadium
Leeds	Wakefield Trinity
11	10
	1	2	Total
LEE	4	7	11
WAK	7	3	10
- Date: 11 May 1968
- Stadium: Wembley Stadium
- Location: London, United Kingdom
- Lance Todd Trophy winner: Don Fox, Wakefield Trinity
- Referee: John Hebblethwaite
- Attendance: 87,100

Broadcast partners
- Broadcasters: BBC Sport
- Commentators: Eddie Waring

The 1968 Challenge Cup Final, or the Watersplash Final, was a rugby league match contested between Leeds and Wakefield Trinity on 11 May 1968 at Wembley Stadium in London. It was the 67th final of English rugby league's primary cup competition, the Challenge Cup. The match was played in virtually unplayable conditions due to the waterlogged state of the pitch—caused by heavy downpours both before and during the game.

The final is best remembered for Wakefield's Don Fox missing a conversion from in front of the posts in the last minute of the game, handing Leeds an 11–10 victory. It was the club's eighth Challenge Cup win, and the first since 1957. Fox was the winner of the Lance Todd Trophy, as he had already been voted as man of the match before his miss.

== Match details ==
11 May 1968
15:00

Leeds	11 – 10	Wakefield Trinity
Try: Atkinson; Goal: Risman (4)	Report	Try: Hirst (2); Goal: Fox (2)

Wembley, London
Attendance: 87,100
Referee: John Hebblethwaite (York)
Player of the Match: Don Fox

FB	1	(England) Bev Risman
RW	2	(England) Alan Smith
RC	3	(England) Syd Hynes
LC	4	(England) Bernard Watson
LW	5	(England) John Atkinson
SO	6	(England) Mick Shoebottom
SH	7	(England) Barry Seabourne
PR	8	(England) Mick Clark (c)
HK	9	(England) Tony Crosby
PR	10	(England) Ken Eyre
SR	11	(England) Bill Ramsey
SR	12	(England) Albert Eyre
LF	13	(England) Ray Batten
Coach:
Roy Francis

FB	1	(England) Gary Cooper
RW	2	(England) Ken Hirst
RC	3	(England) Ian Brooke
LC	4	(South Africa) Gert Coetzer
LW	5	(England) Kenneth Batty
SO	6	(England) Harold Poynton (c)
SH	7	(England) Ray Owen
PR	8	(England) David Jeanes
HK	9	(England) George Shepherd
PR	10	(England) Don Fox
SR	11	(England) Bob Haigh
SR	12	(England) Matthew McLeod
LF	13	(England) David Hawley
Coach:
Ken Traill
