= Ken Rollin =

English rugby league footballer (1937–2024)

Personal information
- Full name: Kenneth Rollin
- Born: 3 December 1937 Sharlston Common, Wakefield, England
- Died: 18 August 2024 (aged 86)

Playing information
- Height: 5 ft 8 in (173 cm)
- Weight: 12 st 0 lb (76 kg)
- Position: Stand-off, Scrum-half
Club
Years	Team	Pld	T	G	FG	P
1955–65	Wakefield Trinity	150	66	0	0	198
1965–67	Leeds	78	18	0	0	54
	Total	228	84	0	0	252

Kenneth "Ken" Rollin (3 December 1937 – 18 August 2024) was an English professional rugby league footballer who played in the 1950s and 1960s. He played at club level for Wakefield Trinity and Leeds as a stand-off or scrum-half.

== Background ==
Rollin was born in Sharlston Common, Wakefield, West Riding of Yorkshire, England.

== Playing career ==
=== Championship final appearances ===
Rollin played stand-off in Wakefield Trinity's 3–27 defeat by Wigan in the Championship Final during the 1959–60 season at Odsal Stadium, Bradford on Saturday 21 May 1960.

=== Challenge Cup Final appearances ===
Rollin played stand-off, and scored the second fastest try ever in a Challenge Cup Final at Wembley Stadium, London in the 38–5 victory over Hull F.C. in the 1959–60 Challenge Cup Final during the 1959–60 season at Wembley Stadium, London on Saturday 14 May 1960.

=== County Cup Final appearances ===
Rollin played scrum-half in Wakefield Trinity's 23–5 victory over Hunslet in the 1956–57 Yorkshire Cup Final during the 1956–57 season at Headingley, Leeds on Saturday 20 October 1956, played scrum-half in the 20–24 defeat by Leeds in the 1958–59 Yorkshire Cup Final during the 1958–59 season at Odsal Stadium, Bradford on Saturday 18 October 1958, and played scrum-half in the 16–10 victory over Huddersfield in the 1960–61 Yorkshire Cup Final during the 1960–61 season at Headingley, Leeds on Saturday 29 October 1960.

=== Notable tour matches ===
Rollin played stand-off and scored a try in Wakefield Trinity's 17–12 victory over Australia in the 1956–57 Kangaroo tour of Great Britain and France match at Belle Vue, Wakefield on Monday 10 December 1956.

== Contemporaneous Article Extract ==
"Outlines - Ken Rollin The first round of a Yorkshire Cup competition is a testing occasion indeed on which to make a senior début, but such was Ken Rollin's introduction to Trinity's first team, against Leeds at Headingley on 27 August 1955. The opposition scrum-half was international Jeff Stevenson - but Ken's display was a most satisfactory one and there was a try for him too as some reward. He went on to make twenty-four appearances in that season and has been a regular member ever since, mostly at scrum-half. Ken is one of many players who began their career in the Wakefield Schools R.L. He was a member of the Technical School teams and Wakefield City Boys' team. He joined our own Trinity Juniors side from which he was signed, at seventeen, by Trinity in April 1955. Although he was named as a reserve for the 1957 World Cup party, and has several times been named as Yorkshire County reserve half-back, he still awaits his first representative match. He was named in Yorkshire's side, alongside Keith Holliday, in 1957, but illness prevented the appearance of this Trinity partnership. In recent times he has occupied the stand-off half berth and has proved himself to be equally at home in that position. His utility value is therefore a great one and, at still only twenty-two years of age, he has much promise for Trinity's fortunes in the future. He has, behind him, the experience of 151 games for Trinity, including appearances at Wembley, in the last N.R.L Final, and in the 1956 and 1958 Yorkshire Cup Finals."

== Outside of Rugby League ==
Rollin was a commentator for a United States television broadcaster for Leeds' 11–10 victory over Wakefield Trinity in the 1968 Challenge Cup "Watersplash" Final during the 1967–68 season at Wembley Stadium, London on Saturday 11 May 1968, in front of a crowd of 87,100. He was left with Aphasia (Loss of the ability to produce and/or comprehend language) following a stroke in 1999 and could say only a few words. This was a cruel blow, as before his stroke, he had been a well-known public speaker in West Yorkshire, England. After working with Speakability and having speech therapy, Ken's communication skills went from near zero to 70 per cent, in 2002 Ken became chairman of the new Wakefield Speakability Group, in June 2007 Ken met with the Cherie Blair to rally support for Speakability and raise awareness of Aphasia, and in December 2008 Ken was a guest speaker at the UK Stroke Forum Conference 2008.

He was employed in his youth in the mining department at Richard Sutcliffe Ltd near Wakefield and a member of the Association of Engineering and Shipbuilding Draughtsmen.

Ken lived in Middlestown, Wakefield, and was a member of the Wakefield Chantry Rotary Club. Rollin died on 18 August 2024, at the age of 86.
