= Alan Rhodes (rugby league, born in Bradford) =

English rugby league footballer

Personal information
- Full name: Alan Rhodes
- Born: Bradford, England

Playing information
- Position: Fullback, Centre
Club
Years	Team	Pld	T	G	FG	P
1961–64	Halifax	45	15	16	0	77
1964–68	Bradford Northern	123	31	34	0	161
1968	Huddersfield
1968–70	Bradford Northern	21	1	0	0	3
	Total	189	47	50	0	241

Alan Rhodes is an English former professional rugby league footballer who played in the 1960s and 1970s, and coached in the 1980s. He played at club level for Bradford Northern (two spells), and Huddersfield, as a goal-kicking fullback or centre, and coached at club level for Bradford Northern (fitness and conditioning coach). Alan Rhodes is a keen golfer, and won the Halifax-Huddersfield Alliance's Geoff Cockin Trophy partnering former Halifax Town chairman Geoff Ralph.

== Background ==
Alan Rhodes was born in Bradford, West Riding of Yorkshire, England.

== Playing career ==
=== Bradford Northern ===
In December 1964, Rhodes and Halifax teammate David Stockwell were transferred to Bradford Northern in exchange for Brian Todd.

Rhodes played at centre in Bradford Northern's 17-8 victory over Hunslet in the 1965 Yorkshire Cup Final during the 1965–66 season at Headingley, Leeds on Saturday 16 October 1965.

=== Huddersfield ===
Rhodes played, and scored a try, and two goals in Huddersfield's 10-15 defeat by Wakefield Trinity in the 1968 Challenge Cup semi-final replay during the 1967–68 season at Headingley, Leeds on Wednesday 3 April 1968, the first match having ended in a 0-0 draw at Odsal Stadium, Bradford on Saturday 30 March 1968.
