= 1966–67 Northern Rugby Football League season =

- League: Northern Rugby Football League
- Champions: Wakefield Trinity
- League Leaders: Leeds
- Top point-scorer: Len Killeen 353
- Top try-scorer(s): Chris Young 34; Keith Howe 34

The 1966–67 Northern Rugby Football League season was the 72nd season of rugby league football in Britain. After Leeds had ended the regular season as league leaders, Wakefield Trinity won their first Championship when they beat St. Helens 21-9 in the Final replay, after a 7-7 draw. The Challenge Cup-winners were Featherstone Rovers who beat Barrow 17-12 in the Wembley final.

== Rule changes ==
Limited tackles:

- The Rugby Football League ended unlimited tackles, introducing a four-tackle rule. The introduction of the "tackle count" in December 1966 meant a team now had a limited number of tackles in which to score before they must surrender possession to their opponents. The limit would remain four until an increase to six tackles in 1972.

== Championship ==
=== League table ===
| | Team | Pld | W | D | L | Pts |
|---|---|---|---|---|---|---|
| 1 | Leeds | 34 | 29 | 0 | 5 | 58 |
| 2 | Hull Kingston Rovers | 34 | 26 | 2 | 6 | 54 |
| 3 | Wakefield Trinity | 34 | 27 | 0 | 7 | 54 |
| 4 | St. Helens | 34 | 22 | 3 | 9 | 47 |
| 5 | Bradford Northern | 34 | 22 | 2 | 10 | 46 |
| 6 | Workington Town | 34 | 22 | 1 | 11 | 45 |
| 7 | Swinton | 34 | 20 | 3 | 11 | 43 |
| 8 | Castleford | 34 | 21 | 0 | 13 | 42 |
| 9 | Hull | 34 | 18 | 3 | 13 | 39 |
| 10 | Oldham | 34 | 18 | 2 | 14 | 38 |
| 11 | Halifax | 34 | 18 | 2 | 14 | 38 |
| 12 | Warrington | 34 | 18 | 1 | 15 | 37 |
| 13 | Leigh | 34 | 17 | 3 | 14 | 37 |
| 14 | Salford | 34 | 18 | 1 | 15 | 37 |
| 15 | Barrow | 34 | 17 | 2 | 15 | 36 |
| 16 | Widnes | 34 | 15 | 5 | 14 | 35 |
| 17 | Wigan | 34 | 17 | 0 | 17 | 34 |
| 18 | Rochdale Hornets | 34 | 15 | 4 | 15 | 34 |
| 19 | Dewsbury | 34 | 15 | 1 | 18 | 31 |
| 20 | Featherstone Rovers | 34 | 12 | 3 | 19 | 27 |
| 21 | Huddersfield | 34 | 13 | 0 | 21 | 26 |
| 22 | York | 34 | 13 | 0 | 21 | 26 |
| 23 | Bramley | 34 | 12 | 0 | 22 | 24 |
| 24 | Keighley | 34 | 11 | 1 | 22 | 23 |
| 25 | Hunslet | 34 | 9 | 2 | 23 | 20 |
| 26 | Blackpool Borough | 34 | 9 | 2 | 23 | 20 |
| 27 | Whitehaven | 34 | 10 | 0 | 24 | 20 |
| 28 | Liverpool City | 34 | 9 | 0 | 25 | 18 |
| 29 | Doncaster | 34 | 8 | 1 | 25 | 17 |
| 30 | Batley | 34 | 7 | 0 | 27 | 14 |

=== Play-offs ===
Round of 16
Leeds | 27
Widnes | 18
Castleford | 21
Hull | 7
Bradford Northern | 12
Warrington | 6
St Helens | 37
Leigh | 12
Wakefield Trinity | 48
Salford | 8
Workington Town | 23
Halifax | 14
Swinton | 12-15
Oldham | 12-7
Hull KR | 17
Barrow | 15

Quarter-finals
Leeds | 9
Castleford | 13
Bradford Northern | 8
St Helens | 15
Wakefield Trinity | 22
Workington Town | 2
Swinton | 10
Hull KR | 36

Semi-finals
Castleford | 3
St Helens | 14
Wakefield Trinity | 18
Hull KR | 6

Final
Wakefield Trinity | 7-21
St Helens | 7-9

=== Final ===
The 1966/67 Championship Final replay was played between Wakefield Trinity and St. Helens on Wednesday, 10 May 1967 at Station Road Ground before a crowd of 33,537. Wakefield Trinity won 21-9 with their try-scoring scrum half back, Ray Owen being awarded the Harry Sunderland Trophy as man-of-the-match.

Final

6 May 1967

| Wakefield Trinity | 7 – 7 | St Helens |
|---|---|---|
| Tries: Owen; Goals: N. Fox (2) | | Tries: Watson; Goals: Killeen (2) |

Headingley, Leeds
Attendance: 20,161
Referee: J. Manley (Warrington)

| Wakefield Trinity | Number | St Helens |
|---|---|---|
| | Teams | |
| Gary Cooper | 1 | Frank Barrow |
| Kenneth Hirst | 2 | Tom van Vollenhoven |
| Ian Brooke | 3 | Tony Barrow |
| Neil Fox | 4 | Wilf Smith |
| Gert Coetzer | 5 | Len Killeen |
| Harold Poynton | 6 | Peter Douglas |
| Ray Owen | 7 | Tommy Bishop |
| John Bath | 8 | John Warlow |
| Bernard Prior | 9 | Bill Sayer |
| Edward Campbell | 10 | Cliff Watson |
| Geoff Clarkson | 11 | Ray French |
| Bob Haigh | 12 | Brian Hogan |
| Don Fox | 13 | John Mantle |
| | Subs | |
| Kenneth Batty | 14 | John Houghton |
| David Hawley | 15 | Joe Robinson (for Hogan) |
| Ken Traill | Coach | Joe Coan |

Replay

10 May 1967

| Wakefield Trinity | 21 – 9 | St Helens |
|---|---|---|
| Tries: Brooke (2), Hirst, Poynton, Owen; Goals: N. Fox (3) | | Tries: Van Vollenhoven; Goals: Killeen (2), Bishop |

Station Road, Swinton
Attendance: 33,537
Referee: J. Manley (Warrington)
Player of the Match: Ray Owen

| Wakefield Trinity | Number | St Helens |
|---|---|---|
| | Teams | |
| Gary Cooper | 1 | Frank Barrow |
| Kenneth Hirst | 2 | Tom van Vollenhoven |
| Ian Brooke | 3 | Tony Barrow |
| Neil Fox | 4 | Wilf Smith |
| Gert Coetzer | 5 | Len Killeen |
| Harold Poynton | 6 | Peter Douglas |
| Ray Owen | 7 | Tommy Bishop |
| John Bath | 8 | John Warlow |
| Bernard Prior | 9 | Bill Sayer |
| Edward Campbell | 10 | Cliff Watson |
| Geoff Clarkson | 11 | Ray French |
| Bob Haigh | 12 | Brian Hogan |
| Don Fox | 13 | John Mantle |
| | Subs | |
| | 14 | John Houghton |
| | 15 | Joe Robinson |
| Ken Traill | Coach | Joe Coan |

== Challenge Cup ==
In the Challenge Cup Final Featherstone Rovers faced Barrow, who were captain-coached by Jim Challinor at Wembley Stadium on Saturday 13 May 1967 in front of a crowd of 76,290.

Featherstone Rovers won 17-12 and it was their first Cup Final win in two Final appearances.

== County cups ==
St. Helens won the Lancashire League, and Leeds won the Yorkshire League. Wigan beat Oldham 16–13 to win the Lancashire County Cup, and Hull Kingston Rovers beat Featherstone Rovers 25–12 to win the Yorkshire County Cup.

== BBC2 Floodlit Trophy ==
The BBC2 Floodlit Trophy winners were Castleford who beat Swinton 7-2 in the final.

== Sources ==
- Saxton, Irvin (ed.). History of Rugby League: No.72 1966–1967. League Publications.
- 1966-67 Rugby Football League season at wigan.rlfans.com
- The Challenge Cup at The Rugby Football League website
