= John Bath =

English rugby league footballer

Personal information
- Full name: John Bath

Playing information
- Position: Prop
Club
Years	Team	Pld	T	G	FG	P
≤1966–66	Hull Kingston Rovers	43	2	0	0	6
1966–68	Wakefield Trinity	45	0	0	0	0
	Total	88	2	0	0	6

John Bath is a former professional rugby league footballer who played in the 1960s. He played at club level for Hull Kingston Rovers, and Wakefield Trinity, as a prop.

== Playing career ==
=== Championship final appearances ===
John Bath played left-prop in Wakefield Trinity’s 21-9 victory over St. Helens in the Championship Final replay during the 1966–67 season at Station Road, Swinton on Wednesday 10 May 1967.

== Club career ==
John Bath made his début for Wakefield Trinity during March 1966, and he played his last match for Wakefield Trinity during the 1967–68 season.
