= 1965–66 Yorkshire Cup =

- Structure: Regional knockout championship
- Teams: 16
- Winners: Bradford Northern
- Runners-up: Hunslet

The 1965–66 Yorkshire Cup was the fifty-eighth occasion on which the Yorkshire Cup competition had been held.

Bradford Northern winning the trophy by beating Hunslet by the score of 17–8

The match was played at Headingley, Leeds, now in West Yorkshire. The attendance was 17,522 and receipts were £4,359.

== Background ==
This season there were no junior/amateur clubs taking part, no new entrants and no "leavers" and so the total of entries remained the same at sixteen.

This in turn resulted in no byes in the first round.

== Competition and results ==
=== Round 1 ===
Involved 8 matches (with no byes) and 16 clubs

Game No	Fixture date	Home team	Score	Away team	Venue	Att	Rec	Notes	Ref
1	Fri 3 Sep 1965	Hunslet	8–2	Doncaster	Parkside				
2	Sat 4 Sep 1965	Batley	9–37	Halifax	Mount Pleasant				
3	Sat 4 Sep 1965	Castleford	22–8	Featherstone Rovers	Wheldon Road				
47	Sat 4 Sep 1965	Dewsbury	4–27	Huddersfield	Crown Flatt	2,800			
5	Sat 4 Sep 1965	Hull Kingston Rovers	17–9	York	Craven Park (1)				
6	Sat 4 Sep 1965	Keighley	2–19	Bradford Northern	Lawkholme Lane				
7	Sat 4 Sep 1965	Leeds	40–4	Bramley	Headingley				
8	Sat 4 Sep 1965	Wakefield Trinity	4–8	Hull F.C.	Belle Vue				

=== Round 2 - Quarter-finals ===
Involved 4 matches and 8 clubs

Game No	Fixture date	Home team	Score	Away team	Venue	Att	Rec	Notes	Ref
1	Mon? 13 Sep 1965	Hunslet	9–8	Hull F.C.	Parkside				
2	Tue 14 Sep 1965	Castleford	25–8	Halifax	Wheldon Road				
3	Wed 15 Sep 1965	Bradford Northern	12–6	Hull Kingston Rovers	Odsal				
4	Wed 15 Sep 1965	Huddersfield	16–6	Leeds	Fartown	4,008			

=== Round 3 – Semi-finals ===
Involved 2 matches and 4 clubs

Game No	Fixture date	Home team	Score	Away team	Venue	Att	Rec	Notes	Ref
1	Mon? 27 Sep 1965	Hunslet	17–10	Castleford	Parkside	9,347			
2	Wed 29 Sep 1965	Bradford Northern	7–7	Huddersfield	Odsal				

=== Semi-final - replays ===
Involved 1 match and 2 clubs

Game No	Fixture date	Home team	Score	Away team	Venue	Att	Rec	Notes	Ref
R	Thu 30 Sep 1965	Huddersfield	4–7	Bradford Northern	Fartown				

=== Final ===
Fixture date	Home team	Score	Away team	Venue	Att	Rec	Notes	Ref
Saturday 16 October 1965	Bradford Northern	17–8	Hunslet	Headingley	17,522	£4,359	(Note: Headingley, Leeds, is the home ground of Leeds RLFC with a capacity of 21,000. The record attendance was 40,175 for a league match between Leeds and Bradford Northern on 21 May 1947.)	

==== Teams and scorers ====
Bradford Northern	No.	Hunslet
	Teams	
Jack Scattergood	1	Billy Langton
Lionel Williamson	2	Barry Lee
Ian Brooke	3	Geoff Shelton
Alan Rhodes	4	Arthur Render
Willie Walker	5	Tommy Thompson
Dave Stockwell	6	Alan Preece
Thomas Smales	7	Alan Marchant
Albert Tonkinson	8	Dennis Hartley
Dennis Morgan	9	Bernard Prior
Dave Hill	10	Billy Baldwinson
Gil Ashton	11	Bill Ramsey
Terry Clawson	12	Geoff Gunney
Johnny Rae	13	Fred Ward
	Subs	
Mal Breakspeare	14	Ray Abbey
Alan Hepworth	15	Colin Larkin
Gus Risman	Coach	Fred Ward
17	score	8
7	HT	3
	Scorers	
	Tries	
Lionel Williamson (2)	T	Barry Lee (1)
Ian Brooke (1)	T	Tommy Thompson (1)
	T	
	T	
	Goals	
Terry Clawson (4)	G	Billy Langton (1)
	G	
	Drop Goals	
	DG	
Referee		Eric Lawrenson (Warrington)

Scoring - Try = three (3) points - Goal = two (2) points - Drop goal = two (2) points

=== The road to success ===
First round
Keighley	2
Bradford Northern	19
Hull Kingston Rovers	17
York	9
Dewsbury	4
Huddersfield	27
Leeds	40
Bramley	4
Hunslet	8
Doncaster	2
Wakefield Trinity	4
Hull F.C.	8
Castleford	22
Featherstone Rovers	8
Batley	9
Halifax	37

Second round
Bradford Northern	12
Hull Kingston Rovers	6
Huddersfield	16
Leeds	6
Hunslet	9
Hull F.C.	8
Castleford	25
Halifax	8

Semi-finals
Bradford Northern	7 (7)
Huddersfield	7 (4)
Hunslet	17
Castleford	10

Final
Bradford Northern	17
Hunslet	8

== See also ==
- 1965–66 Northern Rugby Football League season
- Rugby league county cups
