= Ken Eyre =

GB international rugby league footballer (1941–2018)

Kenneth Eyre
Personal information
- Full name: Kenneth Eyre
- Born: 11 November 1941
- Died: 5 September 2018 (aged 76)

Playing information
- Position: Prop
Club
Years	Team	Pld	T	G	FG	P
1958–66	Hunslet	228	18	0	0	54
1966–70	Leeds	122	10	0	0	30
1970	Keighley
	Total	350	28	0	0	84
Representative
Years	Team	Pld	T	G	FG	P
1965	Great Britain	1	0	0	0	0
1965	Yorkshire	2	0	0	0	0

Ken Eyre (11 November 1941 – 5 September 2018) was a professional rugby league footballer who played in the 1950s, 1960s and 1970s. He played at representative level for Great Britain, and at club level for Hunslet, Leeds and Keighley as a prop. As a child Ken represented Bewerly Street school, Hunslet Schools' R.L. and Yorkshire Schools R.L.

== Playing career ==
=== Club career ===
Eyre made his début for Hunslet in the season 1958-59, he was transferred from Hunslet to Leeds in September 1966 for a fee of £5,950 He broke his arm 4 times in his opening season at Leeds.

Eyre played at prop in Hunslet's 16–20 defeat by Wigan in the 1965 Challenge Cup Final at Wembley Stadium, London on Saturday 8 May 1965, in front of a crowd of 89,016, and played at prop in Leeds' 11–10 victory over Wakefield Trinity in the 1968 Challenge Cup "Watersplash" Final Wembley on Saturday 11 May 1968, in front of a crowd of 87,100.

Eyre played in Hunslet's 22–44 defeat by St. Helens in the Rugby Football League Championship Final during the 1958–59 season at Odsal Stadium, Bradford, and played in Leeds' 16–14 victory over Castleford in the Rugby Football League Championship Final during the 1968–69 season at Odsal Stadium on Saturday 24 May 1969.

Eyre played at prop in Hunslet's 12–2 victory over Hull Kingston Rovers in the 1962 Yorkshire Cup Final at Headingley Rugby Stadium, Leeds on Saturday 27 October 1962, and in the 8–17 defeat by Bradford Northern in the 1965 Yorkshire Cup Final during the 1965–66 season at Headingley on Saturday 16 October 1965, and played at prop, in Leeds' 11–10 victory over Castleford in the 1968 Yorkshire Cup Final during the 1968–69 season at Belle Vue, Wakefield on Saturday 19 October 1968.

=== Representative honours ===
Eyre won a cap for Great Britain while at Hunslet in 1965 against New Zealand.

Eyre represented Yorkshire while at Hunslet against New Zealand at Castleford in 1965, against Lancashire at Swinton in 1965, and against Cumberland at Headingley, Leeds in 1965.

== Personal life ==
Ken Eyre was the older brother of the rugby league second-row who played in the 1960s for Leeds and Keighley; Albert Eyre (born c. second ¼ 1943).
