= 1962–63 Challenge Cup =

Rugby league competition

- Duration: 5 rounds
- Number of teams: 32
- Highest attendance: 84,492
- Broadcast partners: BBC TV
- Winners: Wakefield Trinity
- Runners-up: Wigan
- Lance Todd Trophy: Harold Poynton

The 1962–63 Challenge Cup was the 62nd staging of rugby league's oldest knockout competition, the Challenge Cup.

The final was contested by Wakefield Trinity and Wigan at Wembley Stadium in London.

The final was played on Saturday 11 May 1963, where Wakefield Trinity beat Wigan 25–10 in front of a crowd of 84,492.

The Lance Todd Trophy was awarded to Wakefield stand-off Harold Poynton, taker of a magnificent interception try.

== First round ==
Date	Team one	Team two	Score
9 Feb	Castleford	Leeds	8-10
9 Feb	Liverpool City	Roose (Barrow)	11-0
Mar 2	Barrow	Workington Town	7-16
Mar 2	Blackpool Borough	Dewsbury	12-0
Mar 2	Hull Kingston Rovers	Keighley	6-5
Mar 2	Leigh	Oldham	10-18
Mar 2	Rochdale Hornets	Hunslet	3-16
Mar 2	Salford	York	11-29
Mar 2	Warrington	Doncaster	15-2
Mar 6	Featherstone Rovers	Batley	32-2
Mar 6	Swinton	Widnes	6-6
Mar 7	Hull	Wigan	0-7
Mar 11	Halifax	St Helens	9-2
Mar 11	Huddersfield	Whitehaven	10-11
Mar 11	Wakefield Trinity	Bradford Northern	15-3
Mar 11 - replay	Widnes	Swinton	3-3
Mar 11	Imperial Athletic (York)	Bramley	4-15
Mar 13 - 2nd replay	Swinton	Widnes	4-6

== Second round ==
Date	Team one	Team two	Score
Mar 16	Blackpool Borough	York	12-16
Mar 16	Bramley	Warrington	9-17
Mar 16	Halifax	Hunslet	3-16
Mar 16	Hull Kingston Rovers	Featherstone Rovers	12-2
Mar 16	Widnes	Whitehaven	5-0
Mar 16	Wakefield Trinity	Liverpool City	14-12
Mar 16	Wigan	Leeds	20-11
Mar 16	Workington Town	Oldham	0-13

== Quarter-finals ==
Date	Team one	Team two	Score
Apr 6	Widnes	Hull Kingston Rovers	7-10
Apr 6	York	Wakefield Trinity	9-9
Apr 6	Warrington	Hunslet	7-5
Apr 6	Oldham	Wigan	0-18
Apr 10 - replay	Wakefield Trinity	York	25-11

== Semi-finals ==
Date	Team one	Team two	Score
Apr 20	Wakefield Trinity	Warrington	5-2
Apr 20	Wigan	Hull Kingston Rovers	18-4

== Final ==
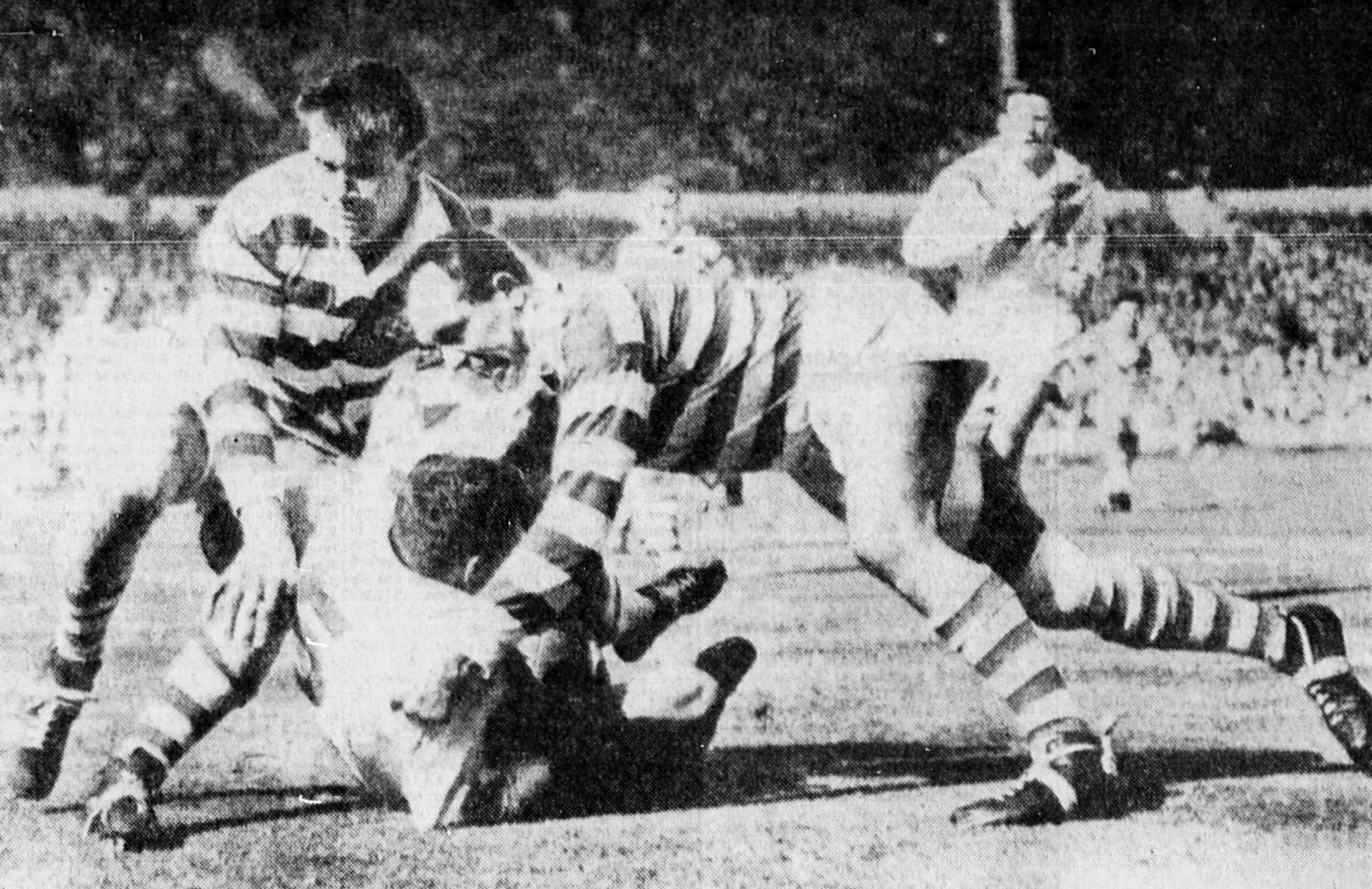
Action from the 1963 final

11 May 1963

Wakefield Trinity	25 – 10	Wigan
Try: Coetzer (2), Brooke, Poynton, Sampson; Goal: Fox (5)	Report	Try: Pitchford, Carlton; Goal: Ashton (2)

Wembley Stadium, London
Attendance: 84,492
Referee: D. T. H. Davies (Manchester)
Player of the Match: Harold Poynton

FB	1	Gerry Round
RW	2	Colin Greenwood
RC	3	Ian Brooke
LC	4	Neil Fox
LW	5	Gert Coetzer
SO	6	Harold Poynton
SH	7	Keith Holliday
PR	8	Jack Wilkinson
HK	9	Milan Kosanović
PR	10	Malcolm Sampson
SR	11	Don Vines
SR	12	Derek Turner (c)
LF	13	Roger Pearman
Coach:
Ken Traill

FB	1	Dave Bolton
RW	2	Billy Boston
RC	3	Eric Ashton (c)
LC	4	Alan Davies
LW	5	Frank Carlton
SO	6	Stan McLeod
SH	7	Frank Pitchford
PR	8	John Barton
HK	9	Bill Sayer
PR	10	Brian McTigue
SR	11	Frank Collier
SR	12	Geoff Lyon
LF	13	Roy Evans
Coach:
Griff Jenkins
