= Peter Fox (rugby league, born 1933) =

English rugby league coach (1933–2019)

Personal information
- Born: 30 March 1933 Sharlston, West Riding of Yorkshire, England
- Died: 25 February 2019 (aged 85)

Playing information
Club
Years	Team	Pld	T	G	FG	P
1953–57	Featherstone Rovers	34	1	15	0	33
1957–63	Batley	148	12	70	0	176
1962–63	Hull Kingston Rovers	28	3	1	0	11
1963–64	Hunslet	2	0	0	0	0
1964–66	Batley	32	1	33	0	69
1966–67	Wakefield Trinity	1	0	0	0	0
	Total	245	17	119	0	289

Coaching information
Club
Years	Team	Gms	W	D	L	W%
1971–74	Featherstone	111	70	4	37	63
1974–76	Wakefield Trinity	60	29	5	26	48
1976–77	Bramley	26	19	0	7	73
1977–85	Bradford Northern	239	147	9	83	62
1985–86	Leeds	43	21	3	19	49
1987–91	Featherstone
1991–95	Bradford Northern
	Total	479	286	21	172	60
Representative
Years	Team	Gms	W	D	L	W%
1977	England	2	0	0	2	0
1978	Great Britain	3	1	0	2	33
1985–91	Yorkshire	8	8	0	0	100
- Father: Tom Fox
- Relatives: Don Fox (brother); Neil Fox (brother)

Peter Fox (30 March 1933 – 25 February 2019) was an English rugby league footballer who played in the 1950s and 1960s, and coached in the 1970s, 1980s and 1990s. He was the brother of Don and Neil Fox, and together they formed one of the legendary rugby league families.

== Career ==
He had a 13-year playing career with; Sharlston Rovers, Featherstone Rovers, Batley, Hull Kingston Rovers, Hunslet and Wakefield Trinity, he became one of British rugby league's most successful coaches.

Peter Fox was the coach in Featherstone Rovers' 33-14 victory over Bradford Northern in the 1973 Challenge Cup Final during the 1972–73 season at Wembley Stadium, London on Saturday 12 May 1973, in front of a crowd of 72,395, and was the coach in the 9-24 defeat by Warrington in the 1974 Challenge Cup Final during the 1973–74 season at Wembley Stadium, London on Saturday 11 May 1974, in front of a crowd of 77,400.

Bramley won promotion to Division One, under Peter Fox in the 1976-77 season.

He coached Great Britain and England, which included beating the Australians in 1978.

He coached Bradford Northern in two spells one in 1977 where he had a very successful spell winning the championship in 1979-80 and 1980-81.

He returned to Bradford Northern for a second spell in 1991, and in the 1993-94 season Bradford Northern finish as runners-up in the Championship behind Wigan on points difference. He left the club in 1995.

Fox also coached Yorkshire in the Rodstock War of the Roses series, winning all six games played against Lancashire between 1985 and 1991.

Fox appears to have scored no drop-goals (or field-goals as they are currently known in Australasia), but prior to the 1974–75 season all goals, whether; conversions, penalties, or drop-goals, scored 2-points, consequently prior to this date drop-goals were often not explicitly documented, therefore '0' drop-goals may indicate drop-goals not recorded, rather than no drop-goals scored.

== Honoured at Featherstone Rovers ==
Peter Fox is a Featherstone Rovers Hall of Fame inductee.
