= Eddie Waring =

English rugby league commentator (1910–1986)

Eddie Waring MBE
Personal information
- Full name: Edward Marsden Waring
- Born: 21 February 1910 Dewsbury, England
- Died: 28 October 1986 (aged 76) Menston, England

Coaching information
Club
Years	Team	Gms	W	D	L	W%
1940–44	Dewsbury	0	0	0	0

Edward Marsden Waring (21 February 1910 – 28 October 1986) was a British rugby league commentator and television personality. He was a rugby league coach for a period during World War II.

== Early life ==
Waring was born on 21 February 1910 in Dewsbury, West Riding of Yorkshire to Arthur Waring, an insurance agent, and Florence Harriet Waring (née Marsden). He grew up in Soothill Nether, and attended Eastborough Council School and Wheelwright Grammar School.

== Early career ==
Waring was never a noted rugby league player; he was more proficient at association football, and had trials with Nottingham Forest and Barnsley. He began work as a typewriter salesman in his home town of Dewsbury, but he gave up that career to join a local newspaper and report on rugby league matches.

Alongside his fledgling journalism career he ran the local Dewsbury Boys Rugby League Club, renaming them the Black Knights (this foreshadowed how Super League clubs were branded some 60 years later). During the Second World War Waring managed Dewsbury RLFC as he was exempted from armed service with an ear condition. Recruiting men from a nearby military camp, he led the club to its second Challenge Cup victory in 1943 – the club's last ever success in the competition.

Waring travelled on HMS Indomitable with the Great Britain national rugby league team on the first post-war tour of Australia. Returning home via the United States, he met Bob Hope, who alerted him to the success of televised sport. This is believed to have convinced him that television would be crucial for rugby league's long-term success. In the UK, he pushed this case harder with the BBC, having written to them as far back as 1931. After several rejections, he was given a chance as a broadcaster when the BBC began to cover the sport. He made his first televised appearance as part of the coverage for the 1949 Challenge Cup final.

== Broadcasting style ==
Waring's commentary polarised opinion over the next decades. For some viewers he would be "Uncle Eddie", the warm and friendly voice of the north, but others believed that his voice simply reinforced stereotypes. During the 1960s, his eccentric mode of speech (Hull Kingston Rovers was pronounced "Hulking Stan Rovers") and his northern accent began to be widely impersonated, largely by Mike Yarwood.

In the badly rain-affected "watersplash" 1968 Challenge Cup Final at Wembley, Waring commiserated with Wakefield Trinity player Don Fox with the famous line: "He's a poor lad!" after Fox had missed a last-minute conversion from in front of the posts which would have snatched victory from Leeds. His commentary on the game was widely praised, with The Guardian saying in 2007 that the game was "seared into the public consciousness" in part because of it.

Many of his lines became catchphrases in the game, including, "It's an up and under" (a rugby tactic consisting of kicking the ball in a high arc, while the rest of the team rushes toward the landing point, hoping to gain possession and field position) and "He's goin' for an early bath" (when a player was sent off the field).

== Celebrity appearances ==
Waring branched out, appearing first as the referee on the television series It's a Knockout, and as the UK's representative on the international umpiring team for the European version of the show, Jeux sans frontières. When Arthur Ellis became the GB referee, Waring became the co-host of It's A Knockout alongside David Vine and later Stuart Hall, compering the 'Marathon' round, and commentating with those colleagues for the international version (where he handled the 'Fil Rouge') and co-hosting the annual international GB heat. From the 1979 series of Jeux Sans Frontieres, Stuart Hall was the lone commentator, but Waring still co-hosted the GB heat in each series until 1981. Unwell, he struggled badly in the 1981 edition and seemed lost for words throughout. He was replaced by Brian Cant for the 1982 GB heat, the last series in which GB participated.

Waring was commentator on a rare professional wrestling show on BBC2 in 1965.

He also made guest appearances in the TV comedy programmes The Morecambe and Wise Show and The Goodies.

== Decline and retirement ==
The split in opinion regarding his contribution to the game, plus illness, led to a decline in Waring's popularity. A petition was organised by some hardcore supporters asking the BBC to remove him from commentary as he was perceived to be portraying a poor image of the game and its northern roots. The BBC stuck with him as their main commentator, though in the late 1970s they also brought in former Great Britain halfback Alex Murphy to work alongside him.

Illness affected him over the next few years, and in January 1981, Waring announced that he would be retiring from commentary at the end of the 1980–81 season. His last game as commentator was the 1981 Premiership final on 16 May 1981. After his retirement, former dual rugby international Ray French became the BBC's chief rugby league commentator.

== Death ==
Waring's overall health declined very quickly after his retirement from the commentary box. He was diagnosed with dementia and was admitted into High Royds Hospital in Menston, West Yorkshire, in late 1983. He died at the hospital on 28 October 1986. His funeral took place at St Giles Church in Bramhope.

== Bibliography ==
- Eddie Waring on Rugby League by Eddie Waring (ISBN 0584103581)
- Rugby League: The Great Ones by Eddie Waring (ISBN 072070300X)
