= George Shepherd (rugby league) =

English rugby league footballer

Personal information
- Full name: George Shepherd
- Born: Crofton, England

Playing information
- Position: Hooker
Club
Years	Team	Pld	T	G	FG	P
1964–69	Wakefield Trinity	114

George Shepherd is an English former professional rugby league footballer who played in the 1960s. He played at club level for Wakefield Trinity, as a hooker.

== Background ==
George Shepherd was born in Crofton, West Riding of Yorkshire, England.

== Playing career ==
=== Championship final appearances ===
George Shepherd played hooker in Wakefield Trinity's 17–10 victory over Hull Kingston Rovers in the Championship Final during the 1967–68 season at Headingley, Leeds on Saturday 4 May 1968.

=== Challenge Cup Final appearances ===
George Shepherd played hooker in Wakefield Trinity's 10–11 defeat by Leeds in the 1968 Challenge Cup "Watersplash" Final during the 1967–68 season at Wembley Stadium, London on Saturday 11 May 1968, in front of a crowd of 87,100.

=== County Cup Final appearances ===
George Shepherd played hooker in Wakefield Trinity's 18–2 victory over Leeds in the 1964 Yorkshire Cup Final during the 1964–65 season at Fartown Ground, Huddersfield on Saturday 31 October 1964.
