= Harold Poynton =

GB international rugby league footballer

Harry Poynton

Personal information
- Full name: Harold Poynton
- Born: 1 March 1936; Wakefield, England
- Died: 4 June 2018 (aged 82); Wakefield, England

Playing information
- Height: 5 ft 8 in (1.73 m)
- Weight: 11 st 5 lb (72 kg)
- Position: Stand-off, Scrum-half
Club
Years	Team	Pld	T	G	FG	P
1957–69	Wakefield Trinity	319	62	16	0	218
Representative
Years	Team	Pld	T	G	FG	P
1960	Yorkshire	1
1962	Great Britain	3	0	0	0	0
- Source: As of 12 February 2009

Harold Poynton (1 March 1936 – 4 June 2018) also known by the nicknames "Fishcake", "Poynton the Pippin", and "Prince of Bamboozlers", was an English professional rugby league footballer who played in the 1950s and 1960s. He played at representative level for Great Britain and Yorkshire, and at club level for Wakefield Trinity (captain), as a stand-off, or scrum-half.

== Background ==
Harold Poynton was born in Lupset, Wakefield, West Riding of Yorkshire, England. He was a pupil at St Michael's School, Flanshaw, Wakefield, and then Snapethorpe School, Lupset, Wakefield, and he would watch Wakefield Trinity play over-the-wall without paying. He joined the British Army at age 18, whilst stationed in Germany, he played association football, and for the first time he played rugby football, and he left the army aged 21, and in 1957 he trialled for Wakefield Trinity's A-Team. He worked as a warehouseman c. 1963, and he later worked as a salesman for a food company. His nickname of "fishcake" originated from his habitual fish and chip shop order following training sessions with Wakefield Trinity, and was given to him by Derek Turner. He and his wife Kath ran newsagent's shops for over 30 years, initially on Hesley Road, Kettlethorpe, Wakefield, and then on Dewsbury Road (opposite Ashleigh Avenue), Lupset, Wakefield.

On 15 July 2007 Harold Poynton had the beer Poynton's Pride named after him. Harold Poynton's funeral service took place at Wakefield Cathedral at 11:00am on 21 June 2018, followed by cremation at Wakefield Crematorium at 1:00pm, and a reception at Waterton House.

== Playing career ==
=== International honours ===
Harold Poynton played stand-off, alongside Wakefield Trinity teammate; prop; Jack Wilkinson, and against teammates centre; Neil Fox, and loose forward; Derek Turner, in Rest of the League's 16–21 defeat by Great Britain in pre-1960 Rugby League World Cup warm-up match, in aid of the George VI's Jubilee Trust, at Knowsley Road, St. Helens on Monday 12 September 1960, he played stand-off in Great Britain's 17–10 victory over Australia in the second 1962 Great Britain Lions tour Ashes Test Match at Lang Park, Brisbane on Saturday 30 June 1962, and the 17–18 defeat by Australia in the third 1962 Great Britain Lions tour Ashes Test Match at Sydney Cricket Ground on Saturday 14 July 1962, and played scrum-half in the 8–27 defeat by New Zealand in the second Test Match at Carlaw Park, Auckland on Saturday 11 August 1962.

In addition to the above Test Matches, Harold Poynton also played in the following 1962 Great Britain Lions tour matches; the 24–10 victory over Western New South Wales at Bathurst, New South Wales on Sunday 27 May 1962, the 18–23 defeat by Newcastle at Newcastle, New South Wales on Monday 4 June 1962, the 36–12 victory over Toowoomba at Toowoomba on Sunday 17 June 1962, the 55–8 victory over Central Queensland at Rockhampton on Wednesday 20 June 1962, the 33–31 victory over Far North Queensland at Cairns on Saturday 23 June 1962, the 20–5 victory over New South Wales at Sydney Cricket Ground on Saturday 7 July 1962, the 10–18 defeat by Northern New South Wales at Tamworth, New South Wales on Sunday 8 July 1962, the 81–14 victory over Bay of Plenty at Rotorua on Tuesday 7 August 1962, the 13–46 defeat by Auckland at Auckland on Monday 13 August 1962, the 49–30 victory over South Africa at Pretoria on Thursday 23 August 1962, the 39–33 victory over South Africa at Durban on Saturday 25 August 1962, and the 45–23 victory over South Africa at Johannesburg on Friday 31 August 1962.

=== County honours ===
Harold Poynton won a cap for Yorkshire while at Wakefield Trinity, he played stand-off, alongside Wakefield Trinity teammates; wing; Fred Smith, centre; Neil Fox, prop; Jack Wilkinson, and second-row; Derek Turner in the defeat by Cumberland, at Recreation Ground, Whitehaven on Wednesday 14 September 1960.

=== Championship final appearances ===
Harold Poynton played stand-off, and was captain, and scored a try in Wakefield Trinity's 21–9 victory over St. Helens in the Championship Final replay during the 1966–67 season at Station Road, Swinton on Wednesday 10 May 1967, played stand-off, and was captain, and scored a goal the 17–10 victory over Hull Kingston Rovers in the Championship Final during the 1967–68 season at Headingley Rugby Stadium, Leeds on Saturday 4 May 1968.

=== Challenge Cup Final appearances ===
Harold Poynton was injured in Wakefield Trinity's 11–2 victory over Featherstone Rovers in the Challenge Cup semi-final at Odsal Stadium, Bradford on Saturday 9 April 1960, and so he missed the 38–5 victory over Hull F.C. in the 1959–60 Challenge Cup Final, but he played stand-off in Wakefield Trinity's 12–6 victory over Huddersfield in the 1961–62 Challenge Cup Final at Wembley Stadium, London on Saturday 12 May 1962, in front of a crowd of 81,263, played stand-off, scored a try, played stand-off, and was man of the match winning the Lance Todd Trophy in the 25–10 victory over Wigan in the 1962–63 Challenge Cup Final at Wembley Stadium, London on Saturday 11 May 1963, in front of a crowd of 84,492, and played stand-off, and was captain in the 10–11 defeat by Leeds in the 1967–68 Challenge Cup Final (the "Watersplash" final) at Wembley Stadium, London on Saturday 11 May 1968, in front of a crowd of 87,100.

=== County Cup Final appearances ===
Harold Poynton played stand-off in Wakefield Trinity's 16–10 victory over Huddersfield in the 1960–61 Yorkshire Cup Final during the 1960–61 season at Headingley Rugby Stadium, Leeds on Saturday 29 October 1960, played stand-off in the 19–9 victory over Leeds in the 1961–62 Yorkshire Cup Final at Odsal Stadium, Bradford on Saturday 11 November 1961, and played stand-off in the 18–2 victory over Leeds in the 1964–65 Yorkshire Cup Final at Fartown, Huddersfield on Saturday 31 October 1964.

=== Club career ===
Geoffrey Oakes, Reg Parker, and Harold Poynton made their début for Wakefield Trinity in the 17–12 victory over St. Helens at Belle Vue, Wakefield on Saturday 1 February 1958, in early 1963 he was the subject of a £8,000 transfer bid from St. Helens, (based on inflation, this would be equivalent to £211,596 in 2023) (based on increases in average earnings, this would be approximately equivalent to £322,100.00 in 2017), and he played his last match for Wakefield Trinity against Huddersfield at Belle Vue, Wakefield on Saturday 13 September 1969, after which he retired due to a recurring knee injury.

=== Testimonial match ===
Harold Poynton's Testimonial match for Wakefield Trinity was the 10–5 victory over the then league-leaders Leeds, at Belle Vue, Wakefield on Monday 15 April 1968.

== Honours ==
Wakefield Trinity

- Challenge Cup: 1961–62, 1962–63
- Rugby Football League: 1966–67, 1967–68

== Family ==
Harold Poynton's married Kathleen (née Stanley) in 1965 in Wakefield. They had two children; David (born 1966) and Rachel (born 1971).
