= Gary Cooper (rugby league) =

English rugby league footballer and coach (1938–2019)

Personal information
- Born: 25 November 1938; Castleford, England
- Died: 18 August 2019 (aged 80)

Playing information
- Position: Fullback, Centre
Club
| Years | Team | Pld | T | G | FG | P |
|---|---|---|---|---|---|---|
| 1958–66 | Featherstone Rovers | 191 | 43 | 9 | 0 | 147 |
| 1967–71 | Wakefield Trinity | 136 | 25 | 0 | 0 | 75 |
| | Total | 327 | 68 | 9 | 0 | 222 |

Coaching information
Club
| Years | Team | Gms | W | D | L | W% |
| 1974–76 | York |

Gary Cooper (25 November 1938 – 18 August 2019) was an English professional rugby league footballer who played in the 1950s, 1960s and 1970s, and coached in the 1970s. He played at representative level for Great Britain (non-Test matches), and at club level for Featherstone Rovers (captain), and Wakefield Trinity, as an occasional goal-kicking fullback, or centre, and coached at club level for Wakefield Trinity (assistant coach to Neil Fox), and York (initially assistant coach to Tommy Harris, then head coach).

== Background ==
Gary Cooper was born in Castleford, West Riding of Yorkshire, England, he died aged 80 from a myocardial infarction (heart attack), and his funeral took place at All Saints Church, North Featherstone at 1:15pm on Thursday 12 September 2019, followed a reception at Featherstone Rovers Clubhouse.

== Playing career ==
=== Featherstone Rovers ===
Gary Cooper made his début for Featherstone Rovers on Wednesday 20 August 1958, and he played his last match for Featherstone Rovers during the 1965–66 season.

=== Wakefield Trinity ===
Gary Cooper played fullback in Wakefield Trinity's 21–9 victory over St. Helens in the Championship Final replay during the 1966–67 season at Station Road, Swinton on Wednesday 10 May 1967, and was man of the match winning the Harry Sunderland Trophy in the 17–10 victory over Hull Kingston Rovers in the Championship Final during the 1967–68 season at Headingley, Leeds on Saturday 4 May 1968.

Gary Cooper played fullback in Wakefield Trinity's 10–11 defeat by Leeds in the 1968 Challenge Cup "Watersplash" Final during the 1967–68 season at Wembley Stadium, London on Saturday 11 May 1968, in front of a crowd of 87,100.

=== International honours ===
Gary Cooper was selected for Great Britain while at Featherstone Rovers for the 1962 Great Britain Lions tour of Australia and New Zealand, during which he played 16 non-Test matches.

== Coaching career ==
Cooper was the assistant coach in York's 5–32 defeat by St. Helens in the 1971–72 Challenge Cup quarter-final match during the 1971–72 season at Clarence Street, York on Saturday 4 March 1972.

== Personal life ==
Gary Cooper was the older brother of the rugby league footballer who played in the 1960s and 1970s for Wakefield Trinity; Brian Cooper, the rugby league executive (former chairperson of Hull F.C.); Kath M. Hetherington (née Cooper), and the brother-in-law of her husband the rugby league player, coach and executive; Gary Hetherington, and the older brother of rugby league footballer who played in the 1970s for York and Wakefield Trinity (A-Team); Stephen "Steve" Cooper.
