= Don Fox =

GB & England international rugby league footballer and coach

Personal information
- Full name: Donald Fox
- Born: 15 October 1935 Sharlston, Wakefield, England
- Died: 21 August 2008 (aged 72) Wakefield, England

Playing information
- Position: Scrum-half, Prop, Loose forward
Club
Years	Team	Pld	T	G	FG	P
1953–65	Featherstone Rovers	368	162	503	0	1492
1965–70	Wakefield Trinity	117	18	84	0	222
	Batley
	Total	485	180	587	0	1714
Representative
Years	Team	Pld	T	G	FG	P
1956–58	Yorkshire	3	2	0	0	6
1956	England	1	0	0	0	0
1956–63	Great Britain	2	3	2	0	13

Coaching information
Club
Years	Team	Gms	W	D	L	W%
1972–74	Batley
- Father: Tom Fox
- Relatives: Neil Fox (brother); Peter Fox (brother)

Donald Fox (15 October 1935 – 21 August 2008) was an English rugby league footballer who played in the 1950s, 1960s and 1970s, and coached in the 1970s. He played at representative level for Great Britain, England and Yorkshire, and at club level for Featherstone Rovers (captain) and Wakefield Trinity, as a right-footed goal-kicking scrum-half, prop or loose forward, and coached at club level for Batley.

== Background ==
Don Fox was born in Sharlston, near Wakefield, West Riding of Yorkshire, England. He was the younger brother of Peter, and the older brother of Neil Fox, and together they formed one of the legendary rugby league families.

== Club career ==
=== Featherstone Rovers ===
Don Fox earned his début for Featherstone Rovers as a scrum-half on Wednesday 9 September 1953. A gifted player, he broke Featherstone Rovers' record points scored in a season, the next winter and was called up for England's game against France. He was an outstanding kicker, scoring 12 goals in a Challenge Cup victory against Stanningley ARLFC in 1964.

Don Fox played scrum-half, and scored a try in Featherstone Rovers' 15–14 victory over Hull F.C. in the 1959–60 Yorkshire Cup Final during the 1959–60 season at Headingley, Leeds on Saturday 31 October 1959, and played scrum-half in Featherstone Rovers' 0–10 defeat by Halifax in the 1963–64 Yorkshire Cup Final during the 1963–64 season at Belle Vue, Wakefield on Saturday 2 November 1963.

Don Fox's benefit season/testimonial match at Featherstone Rovers took place during the 1963–64 season.

Don holds Featherstone Rovers record for tries scored (162) and is third on their all-time goal-kicking charts with 503 in 369 appearances, itself the 7th most in Featherstone Rovers' history, having enjoyed 13 years at Featherstone Rovers. Don Fox is a Featherstone Rovers Hall of Fame inductee.

=== Wakefield Trinity ===
He joined Wakefield in 1965 for a fee of £3,000, linking up with his younger brother Neil, where they enjoyed great success with Wakefield Trinity. After he retired from playing in 1970, he coached Batley from November 1972 to October 1974, before becoming a safety-joiner in the South Yorkshire coalfield. He died in a hospital in Wakefield, West Yorkshire, England.

Fox played loose forward in Wakefield Trinity's 21–9 victory over St. Helens in the Championship Final replay during the 1966–67 season at Station Road, Swinton on Wednesday 10 May 1967, and played at prop, and scored a goal in the 17–10 victory over Hull Kingston Rovers in the Championship Final during the 1967–68 season at Headingley, Leeds on Saturday 4 May 1968.

==== 1968 Challenge Cup Final ====
Don Fox played at prop, and scored two conversions in Wakefield Trinity's 10–11 defeat by Leeds in the 1967–68 Challenge Cup "Watersplash" Final during the 1967–68 season at Wembley Stadium, London on Saturday 11 May 1968, in front of a crowd of 87,100. The match was played on a waterlogged pitch and the score was 11–7 to Leeds when Ken Hirst scored a try under the posts for Wakefield Trinity with the final play of the game. Tries were worth three points at that time, making the score 11–10, but a simple 2-point conversion was all that was needed to give Wakefield an unassailable one-point lead, and win the game. Wakefield Trinity fans were jubilant as the conversion from in front of the posts is by far the easiest kick in rugby league. Fox had already scored two more difficult conversions in the game, and he was such a prolific kicker that it realistically should have presented no problem. However, the waterlogged state of the pitch made this a more difficult proposition, and Fox lost his footing and sliced the ball wide of the posts. The final whistle was blown immediately afterwards, giving Leeds a dramatic one-point victory. Commentator Eddie Waring said of Fox, 'He's a poor lad', a remark which became a widely quoted piece of commentary. Fox had already been chosen to win the Lance Todd Trophy for his performance in the match, but he was disconsolate and trudged off the pitch. Interviewed by David Coleman on television later, he was asked if the trophy was any consolation and replied "not really, no". The boots he was wearing during the game are now on display at Wakefield Museum.

== International honours ==
=== Great Britain ===
Fox represented Great Britain while at Featherstone Rovers in 1956 against France (1 non-Test match), and he was selected for Great Britain while at Featherstone Rovers for the 1962 Great Britain Lions tour of Australia and New Zealand.

Don Fox was understudy to Alex Murphy on the 1962 Lions tour. He later moved to loose forward, where he earned his sole Test cap for Great Britain against Australia in 1963, scoring one try and two goals in a 16–5 win.

=== England ===
Fox won one cap for England, during the 1955-56 European Rugby League Championship, v France on 10 May 1956; France won 23–9.

=== County honours ===
Don Fox won caps for Yorkshire while at Featherstone Rovers; during the 1956–57 season against Cumberland and Lancashire, and during the 1958–59 season against and Lancashire, he also won a cap(s) for Yorkshire while at Wakefield Trinity.
