= Matthew McLeod =

English rugby league footballer

Personal information
- Full name: Matthew McLeod
- Born: 23 December 1938 Whitehaven, England
- Died: 3 July 1983 (aged 44) Newcastle upon Tyne, England

Playing information
- Position: Prop, Second-row
Club
Years	Team	Pld	T	G	FG	P
≤1962–≥63	Workington Town
1968–69/70	Wakefield Trinity	76	5	0	0	15
≤1970–≥70	Whitehaven
	Total	76	5	0	0	15
- Source: As of 12 February 2009

Matthew "Matt" McLeod (23 December 1938 – 3 July 1983) was an English professional rugby league footballer who played in the 1960s and 1970s. He played at club level for Workington Town, Wakefield Trinity and Whitehaven, as a prop or second-row.

== Background ==
Matt McLeod was born in Whitehaven, Cumberland, England, and he died aged 44 in Royal Victoria Infirmary, Newcastle upon Tyne, Tyne and Wear.

== Playing career ==
=== Championship final appearances ===
Matt McLeod played at second-row in Wakefield Trinity's 17-10 victory over Hull Kingston Rovers in the Championship Final during the 1967-68 season at Headingley, Leeds on Saturday 4 May 1968.

=== Challenge Cup Final appearances ===
Matt McLeod played at second-row in Wakefield Trinity's 10-11 defeat by Leeds in the 1968 Challenge Cup "Watersplash" Final during the 1967–68 season at Wembley Stadium, London on Saturday 11 May 1968, in front of a crowd of 87,100.

=== Club career ===
Matt McLeod made his début for Wakefield Trinity during January 1968, and he played his last match for Wakefield Trinity during the 1969–70 season.
