= Edward Campbell (rugby league) =

English rugby league footballer

Personal information
- Full name: Edward Campbell
- Born: third ¼ 1943 Wakefield, England
- Died: 27 July 2015 (aged 71) Royston, South Yorkshire, England

Playing information
- Position: Prop
Club
Years	Team	Pld	T	G	FG	P
1962–70	Wakefield Trinity
1973–75	Wakefield Trinity
1976–≥76	York
	Total	0	0	0	0	0

Edward "Ted" Campbell (third ¼ 1943 – 27 July 2015) was an English professional rugby league footballer who played in the 1960s and 1970s. He played at club level for Wakefield Trinity (two spells), and York, as a prop.

== Background ==
Ted Campbell's birth was registered in Wakefield, West Riding of Yorkshire, England, and he died after a long illness aged 71 in Royston, South Yorkshire, England.

== Playing career ==
=== Championship final appearances ===
Ted Campbell played at prop in Wakefield Trinity's 21–9 victory over St. Helens in the Championship Final replay during the 1966–67 season at Station Road, Swinton on Wednesday 10 May 1967.

=== County Cup Final appearances ===
Ted Campbell played at prop in Wakefield Trinity's 18–2 victory over Leeds in the 1964 Yorkshire Cup Final during the 1964–65 season at Fartown Ground, Huddersfield on Saturday 31 October 1964.

=== Club career ===
Ted Campbell made his début for Wakefield Trinity during August 1962, he made his last appearance for Wakefield Trinity (in his first spell) during February 1970, made his début for Wakefield Trinity (in his second spell) during February 1973, he made his last appearance for Wakefield Trinity (in his second spell) during the 1975–76 season.
