= David Hawley (rugby league) =

English rugby league footballer

Dave Hawley
Personal information
- Full name: David Hawley

Playing information
- Position: Loose forward
Club
Years	Team	Pld	T	G	FG	P
1966–71	Wakefield Trinity	161	18	0	0	54
- As of 21 July 2021

David "Dave" Hawley is a former professional rugby league footballer who played in the 1960s and 1970s. He played at club level for Wakefield Trinity, as a loose forward.

== Playing career ==
=== Championship final appearances ===
Dave Hawley played loose forward, in Wakefield Trinity's 17-10 victory over Hull Kingston Rovers in the Championship Final during the 1967-68 season at Headingley, Leeds on Saturday 4 May 1968.

=== Challenge Cup Final appearances ===
Dave Hawley played loose forward, in Wakefield Trinity's 10-11 defeat by Leeds in the 1968 Challenge Cup "Watersplash" Final during the 1967–68 season at Wembley Stadium, London on Saturday 11 May 1968, in front of a crowd of 87,100.
