= Johnny Rae (rugby league) =

GB international rugby league footballer

Personal information
- Full name: John Rae
- Born: c. 1942; Pica, Cumberland, England
- Died: 2021 (aged 79)

Playing information
- Position: Loose forward
Club
Years	Team	Pld	T	G	FG	P
1961–64	Oldham	41	12	0	0	36
1964–68	Bradford Northern	132	40	9	0	138
	Total	173	52	9	0	174
Representative
Years	Team	Pld	T	G	FG	P
1964–67	Cumberland	4	2	0	0	6
1965	Great Britain	1	0	0	0	0

John "Johnny" Rae (c. 1942 – 2021) was a professional rugby league footballer who played in the 1960s. He played at representative level for Great Britain, and at club level for Oldham and Bradford Northern, as a loose forward.

== Early life ==
Rae grew up in Pica, a village located between Whitehaven and Workington.

== Playing career ==
=== Club career ===
Rae was signed from amateur club Wath Brow by Oldham, and made his debut for the club in March 1961.

Rae joined Bradford Northern in 1964, and played loose forward in the club's 17–8 victory over Hunslet in the 1965 Yorkshire Cup Final at Headingley, Leeds on Saturday 16 October 1965.

A knee injury forced him to retire from the sport at the age of 27.

=== International honours ===
Johnny Rae won a cap for Great Britain while at Bradford Northern in 1965 against New Zealand.
