= Tom Fox (rugby league) =

English rugby league footballer

Personal information
- Full name: Tom Fox
- Born: 30 March 1908 Featherstone, Wakefield, England
- Died: March 2002 (aged 93–94)

Playing information
- Position: Second-row
Club
Years	Team	Pld	T	G	FG	P
1931–35	Featherstone Rovers	26	3	0	0	9
- Relatives: Peter Fox (son); Don Fox (son); Neil Fox (son)

Tom "Tommy" Fox (30 March 1908 – March 2002) was a professional rugby league footballer who played in the 1930s. He played at club level for Featherstone Rovers.

== Playing career ==
Tom Fox made his début for Featherstone Rovers on Saturday 3 October 1931.
