= Ray Owen (rugby league) =

English rugby league footballer

Personal information
- Full name: Raymond Owen
- Born: third ¼ 1940 Prescot, England
- Died: 5 February 2006 (aged 65) Widnes, England

Playing information
- Position: Scrum-half
Club
| Years | Team | Pld | T | G | FG | P |
|---|---|---|---|---|---|---|
| 1960–64 | Widnes | 55 | 11 | | | 33 |
| 1964–69 | Wakefield Trinity | 82 | 19 | 2 | 0 | 61 |
| | Total | 137 | 30 | 2 | 0 | 94 |
- Father: Harry Owen

Raymond "Ray" Owen (birth registered third ¼ 1940 – 5 February 2006) was an English professional rugby league footballer who played in the 1960s, and a chairman of the 1980s and 1990s. He played at club level for Widnes and Wakefield Trinity, as a scrum-half, and he was chairman for Widnes from 1987 to 1991.

== Background ==
Ray Owen's birth was registered in Prescot district, Lancashire, England, and he died aged 65 in Widnes, Cheshire, England.

== Playing career ==
=== Championship final appearances ===
Ray Owen played scrum-half, scored a try, and was man of the match winning the Harry Sunderland Trophy, in Wakefield Trinity's 21-9 victory over St. Helens in the Championship Final replay during the 1966–67 season at Station Road, Swinton on Wednesday 10 May 1967, and scored two tries in the 17-10 victory over Hull Kingston Rovers in the Championship Final during the 1967–68 season at Headingley, Leeds on Saturday 4 May 1968.

=== Challenge Cup Final appearances ===
Ray Owen played scrum-half in Widnes' 13-5 victory over Hull Kingston Rovers in the 1963–64 Challenge Cup Final during the 1963–64 season at Wembley Stadium, London on Saturday 9 May 1964, in front of a crowd of 84,488, and played scrum-half in Wakefield Trinity's 10-11 defeat by Leeds in the 1968 Challenge Cup "Watersplash" Final during the 1967–68 season at Wembley Stadium, London on Saturday 11 May 1968, in front of a crowd of 87,100.

=== County Cup Final appearances ===
Ray Owen played scrum-half in Wakefield Trinity's 18-2 victory over Leeds in the 1964 Yorkshire Cup Final during the 1964–65 season at Fartown Ground, Huddersfield on Saturday 31 October 1964.

=== Club career ===
Ray Owen made his début for Wakefield Trinity during August 1964, and he played his last match for Wakefield Trinity during the 1968–69 season.

=== Rugby league career ===
Ray Owen was chairman of Widnes during the glory years of the 1980s, and was still involved, as chairman of the Widnes Past Players Association, up to his death.

== Personal life ==
Ray Owen was the son of the rugby league footballer Harry Owen, and the younger brother of the rugby league footballer for Widnes, and Liverpool City, Harry Owen, Jr.
