= Colin Greenwood (rugby) =

South African rugby footballer and coach

- Scanlens trading card featuring Colin Greenwood

Personal information
- Full name: Colin Marius Greenwood
- Born: 25 January 1936 Cape Town, South Africa
- Died: 3 October 1998 (aged 62) George, Western Cape, South Africa

Playing information

Rugby union
- Position: Centre
Club
Years	Team	Pld	T	G	FG	P
	Noordelikes (Northerns)
	Western Province
	Total	0	0	0	0	0
Representative
Years	Team	Pld	T	G	FG	P
1961	South Africa	1	2	0	0	6

Rugby league
- Position: Wing, Centre
Club
Years	Team	Pld	T	G	FG	P
1960–64	Wakefield Trinity	75	32	0	0	96
1964–68	North Sydney	78	24	0	0	72
1969	Canterbury	2	0	0	0	0
	Total	155	56	0	0	168
Representative
Years	Team	Pld	T	G	FG	P
1961–62	Rugby League XIII	1	0	0	0	0
1963	South Africa	2	2	0	0	6

Coaching information
Club
Years	Team	Gms	W	D	L	W%
1968	North Sydney	22	4	8	0	18

Colin "Col" Marius Greenwood (25 January 1936 – 3 October 1998) was a South African dual-code international rugby union and professional rugby league footballer who played in the 1960s, and coached rugby league in the 1960s. He played representative level rugby union (RU) for South Africa, at provincial level for Western Province, and at club level for Noordelikes (Northerns), as a centre, and representative level rugby league (RL) for South Africa and Rugby League XIII, and at club level for Wakefield Trinity, North Sydney Bears and Canterbury-Bankstown Bulldogs, as a wing, stand-off, or lock, and coached club level rugby league (RL) for North Sydney Bears.

== Background ==
Col Greenwood was born in Cape Town, Western Cape, South Africa, and he died aged 62 in George, Western Cape, South Africa.

== Playing career ==
=== International honours ===
Col Greenwood won a cap for South Africa (RU) while at Noordelikes (Northerns / Connect NTK RFC) against Ireland at Newlands Stadium, Cape Town on Saturday 13 May 1961, and won caps for South Africa (RL) while at Wakefield Trinity in 1963 against Australia (2 matches).

=== Challenge Cup Final appearances ===
Col Greenwood played on the wing in Wakefield Trinity's 25–10 victory over Wigan in the 1963 Challenge Cup Final during the 1962–63 season at Wembley Stadium, London on Saturday 11 May 1963, in front of a crowd of 84,492.

=== County Cup Final appearances ===
Col Greenwood played stand-off in Wakefield Trinity's 19–9 victory over Leeds in the 1961 Yorkshire Cup Final during the 1961–62 season at Odsal Stadium, Bradford on Saturday 11 November 1961.

Sporting positions
Preceded by Billy Wilson; 1967	Coach North Sydney; 1968	Succeeded by Roy Francis; 1969–1970
