= Gert Coetzer =

South African rugby league & union player

Personal information
- Full name: Gert Coetzer
- Born: c. 1938–39 Bloemfontein, South Africa
- Died: 10 November 2018 (aged 79) Pretoria, South Africa

Playing information

Rugby union
- Position: Wing
Club
Years	Team	Pld	T	G	FG	P
≤1963–≤63	Bloemfontein RI RFC
Representative
Years	Team	Pld	T	G	FG	P
≤1963–≤63	Orange Free State	44

Rugby league
- Position: Wing, Centre
Club
Years	Team	Pld	T	G	FG	P
≤1963–≤63	Johannesburg Celtic
≤1963–Feb 63	Bloemfontein Aquilae
Feb 1963–68	Wakefield Trinity	191	122	0	0	366
	Total	191	122	0	0	366
Representative
Years	Team	Pld	T	G	FG	P
≤1965–≥65	Commonwealth XIII	≥1
1965	Other Nationalities	1

Gert Coetzer (c. 1938–39 – 10 November 2018) was a South African rugby union and professional rugby league footballer who played in the 1950s and 1960s. He was nicknamed "Oupa", meaning "Old Man" in Afrikaans. He played representative level rugby union (RU) for Orange Free State (Note: OFS is now represented by the Free State Cheetahs), and at club level for the Bloemfontein Railway Institute RFC (as a wing). Coetzer played in the South African national rugby league team, and in the Other Nationalities and Commonwealth XIII representative rugby league squads. At club rugby league level, he played for Johannesburg Celtic, Bloemfontein Aquilae, and Wakefield Trinity, as a wing or centre.

== Background ==
Gert Coetzer was born in Bloemfontein, South Africa. He worked as a waterworks superintendent in Yorkshire (c. 1968). He died aged 79 in South Africa. Coetzer's funeral service was held on Wednesday, 14 November 2018, at Nederduitse Gereformeerde Gemeente (Dutch Reformed Church) in Doornpoort, North East Pretoria, South Africa.

== Playing career ==
=== Club career ===
Gert Coetzer transferred from rugby union to rugby league in February 1963; he made his debut for Wakefield Trinity during March 1963, and he played his last match for Wakefield during the 1967–68 season.

He played on the wing in the 2–19 defeat by St. Helens at Knowsley Road.

=== Finals matches ===
==== Championship ====
Coetzer, playing on the wing, scored two tries in Wakefield Trinity's 21–9 victory over St. Helens in the 1966–67 Championship Final. He also played on the wing in the 17–10 victory over Hull Kingston Rovers in the 1967–68 Championship Final.

==== Challenge Cup ====
Gert Coetzer played on the wing, and scored two tries in Wakefield Trinity's 25–10 victory over Wigan in the 1962–63 Challenge Cup Final, and played at centre in the 10–11 defeat by Leeds in the "Watersplash" Final during the 1967–68 Challenge Cup Season.

==== County Cup ====
In Wakefield Trinity's 18–2 victory over Leeds Rhinos in the 1964–65 Yorkshire Cup Final, Coetzer played on the wing.

=== International matches ===
Gert Coetzer took part in a trial match for the South African national rugby union team, the Springboks. While at Wakefield Trinity, he represented both the Other Nationalities rugby league side, as well as the Commonwealth XIII rugby league team. Coetzer was selected as part of South Africa's national team in their 1963 tour of Australia, but sustained a dislocated shoulder during the second tour match (against Monaro), and took no further part in the tour.

== Personal life ==
Gert Coetzer was married to Laurika (née Viljoen). They had a child, Derek Coetzer (born during the first quarter of 1967 (age 58–59) in Dewsbury district).
