= 1967–68 Northern Rugby Football League season =

1967–68 Rugby Football League season
- League: Northern Rugby Football League
- Champions: Wakefield Trinity
- League Leaders: Leeds
- Top point-scorer: Bev Risman 332
- Top try-scorer: Roger Millward 38

The 1967–68 Rugby Football League season was the 73rd season of rugby league football.

== Season summary ==
The playing of matches on Sundays was sanctioned for the first time in December 1967. This change was made to avoid competition from association football clubs.

Leeds had ended the regular season as league leaders for the second successive season. Wakefield Trinity won their second Championship, the second in successive seasons, when they beat Hull Kingston Rovers 17-10 in the Championship Final. Gary Cooper was awarded the Harry Sunderland Trophy as man-of-the-match.

The Challenge Cup winners were Leeds who beat Wakefield Trinity 11-10 in the final.

Clive Sullivan of Hull F.C. set a club record of 7-tries scored in a match against Doncaster on 15 April 1968.

Warrington won the Lancashire League, and Leeds won the Yorkshire League.

== Championship ==
	Team	Pld	W	D	L	Pts
1	Leeds	34	28	0	6	56
2	Wakefield Trinity	34	24	1	9	49
3	Hull Kingston Rovers	34	24	1	9	49
4	St. Helens	34	24	1	9	49
5	Warrington	34	24	0	10	48
6	Bradford Northern	34	24	0	10	48
7	Leigh	34	22	1	11	45
8	Castleford	34	22	1	11	45
9	Salford	34	22	0	12	44
10	Workington Town	34	21	1	12	43
11	Wigan	34	21	0	13	42
12	Hull	34	21	0	13	42
13	Halifax	34	19	2	13	40
14	Swinton	34	18	1	15	37
15	Huddersfield	34	17	2	15	36
16	Widnes	34	17	1	16	35
17	Dewsbury	34	17	0	17	34
18	Featherstone Rovers	34	16	0	18	32
19	Barrow	34	14	0	20	28
20	Bramley	34	14	0	20	28
21	Hunslet	34	13	0	21	26
22	Oldham	34	13	0	21	26
23	Rochdale Hornets	34	13	0	21	26
24	Liverpool City	34	11	2	21	24
25	Whitehaven	34	10	1	23	21
26	York	34	9	1	24	19
27	Keighley	34	8	0	26	16
28	Blackpool Borough	34	6	1	27	13
29	Doncaster	34	4	2	28	10
30	Batley	34	4	1	29	9

=== Play-offs ===
Round of 16
Leeds	31
Widnes	17
Bradford Northern	8
Wigan	28
Castleford	47
Salford	15
Wakefield Trinity	20
Huddersfield	11
Warrington	12
Hull	9
St Helens	31
Halifax	2
Hull KR	17
Swinton	2
Leigh	43
Workington Town	4

Quarter-finals
Leeds	7
Wigan	11
Catleford	14
Wakefield Trinity	17
Warrington	0
St Helens	20
Hull KR	22
Leigh	3

Semi-finals
Wigan	9
Wakefield Trinity	17
St Helens	10
Hull KR	23

Final
Wakefield Trinity	17
Hull KR	10

==== Final ====
4 May 1968

Wakefield Trinity	17 – 10	Hull Kingston Rovers
Tries: N. Fox, Owen, Jeanes; Goals: N. Fox (2), Poynton, D. Fox		Tries: Moore, Longstaff; Goals: Millward (2)

Headingley, Leeds
Attendance: 22,586
Referee: D. S. Brown (Preston)
Player of the Match: Gary Cooper

Wakefield Trinity	Number	Hull Kingston Rovers
	Teams	
Gary Cooper	1	David Wainwright
Gert Coetzer	2	Chris Young
Ian Brooke	3	John Moore
Neil Fox	4	Alan Burwell
Kenneth Batty	5	Paul Longstaff
Harold Poynton	6	Roger Millward
Ray Owen	7	Colin Cooper
David Jeanes	8	Les Foster
George Shepherd	9	Peter Flanagan
Don Fox	10	Brian Mennell
Bob Haigh	11	Phil Lowe
Matthew McLeod	12	Terry Major
David Hawley	13	Frank Foster
	Subs	
Kenneth Hirst	14	Phil Coupland
Edward Campbell	15	Bill Holliday
Ken Traill	Coach	Colin Hutton

== Challenge Cup ==
Leeds beat Wakefield 11-10 in the final played at Wembley in front of a crowd of 87,100. This was Leeds’ ninth Cup Final win in eleven Final appearances. The Leeds winning team coached by Roy Francis was; Bev Risman, Alan Smith, Syd Hynes, Bernard Watson, John Atkinson, Mick Shoebottom, Barry Seabourne, Mick Clark (c), Tony Crosby, Ken Eyre, Bill Ramsey, Albert Eyre, Ray Batten subs: John Langley, Mick Joyce.

Dubbed the "Watersplash Final", this match was remembered for the atrocious pitch conditions caused by a torrential downpour that left many large puddles on the playing surface. The conditions contributed to a nail biting finale. Leeds had taken an 11-7 lead with a minute to go, but Wakefield scored a try next to the posts from the kick-off. Don Fox had only to convert to win the Final, but pushed it wide of the posts.

== County cups ==
St. Helens beat Warrington 2–2 (replay 13–10) to win the Lancashire County Cup, and Hull Kingston Rovers beat Hull F.C. 8–7 to win the Yorkshire County Cup.

== BBC2 Floodlit Trophy ==
The BBC2 Floodlit Trophy winners were Castleford who beat Leigh 8-5 in the final.

== Kangaroo Tour ==
From September until December also saw the appearance of the Australian team in England on their 1967–68 Kangaroo Tour. Other than the three test Ashes series against Great Britain (won 2–1 by Australia), The Kangaroos played matches against club and county representative sides

The 1967–68 Kangaroos were captain-coached by champion St George Dragons centre Reg Gasnier who was making his third tour following from 1959–60 and 1967–68. While his team achieved success, the tour was a tragedy for Gasnier. He broke his leg during the first test at Headingley that saw him sit out the remainder of the English leg. He returned to the field in France but in a minor game against Les Espoirs in Avignon, he suffered a further break. This would ultimately cause him to announce his retirement from playing at the age of just 28. He later told in an interview that he never regretted his decision to retire, explaining that he had been playing rugby league including juniors, junior representative games, the Sydney premiership and senior representative teams which included multiple interstate and overseas tours, virtually non-stop since the early 1950s, and felt it was about time that he started devoting more time to his family.

== Sources ==
- Saxton, Irvin (ed.). History of Rugby League: No.73 1967–1968. League Publications.
- 1967-68 Rugby Football League season at wigan.rlfans.com
- The Challenge Cup at The Rugby Football League website
