= Gerry Round =

GB international rugby league footballer

Personal information
- Full name: Gerald Vernon Round
- Born: c. 1939 Hebden Bridge, England
- Died: 1 February 1969 (aged 29) Birkenshaw, West Riding of Yorkshire, England

Playing information
- Height: 6 ft 0 in (1.83 m)
- Weight: 12 st 7 lb (79 kg)
- Position: Fullback
Club
Years	Team	Pld	T	G	FG	P
1958–68	Wakefield Trinity	241	55	127	0	419
Representative
Years	Team	Pld	T	G	FG	P
1959–62	Great Britain	8	0	0	0	0

Gerald Vernon Round (c. 1939 – 1 February 1969) was an English professional rugby league footballer who played in the 1950s and 1960s. He played at representative level for Great Britain, and at club level for Wakefield Trinity, as a fullback.

== Background ==
Gerry Round was born in Hebden Bridge, West Riding of Yorkshire, England. He died on 1 February 1969, aged 29, when his car hit a lamp post in Birkenshaw, near Bradford.

== Playing career ==
=== Club career ===
Gerry Round made his début for Wakefield Trinity in March 1958.

Round played fullback in Wakefield Trinity's 3–27 defeat by Wigan in the Championship Final during the 1959–60 season at Odsal Stadium, Bradford on Saturday 21 May 1960. He played fullback in Wakefield Trinity's 38–5 victory over Hull F.C. in the 1959–60 Challenge Cup Final during the 1959–60 season at Wembley Stadium, London on Saturday 14 May 1960, in front of a crowd of 79,773.

Round played fullback in Wakefield Trinity's 19–9 victory over Leeds in the 1961–62 Yorkshire Cup Final during the 1961–62 season at Odsal Stadium, Bradford on Saturday 11 November 1961. He played fullback in the 12–6 victory over Huddersfield in the 1961–62 Challenge Cup Final during the 1961–62 season at Wembley Stadium, London on Saturday 12 May 1962, in front of a crowd of 81,263.

Round played fullback in the 25–10 victory over Wigan in the 1962–63 Challenge Cup Final during the 1962–63 season at Wembley Stadium, London on Saturday 11 May 1963, in front of a crowd of 84,492.

Round played his last match for Wakefield Trinity during the 1968–69 season.

=== International honours ===
Round made his debut for Great Britain in December 1959 against Australia, after only 29 senior appearances in rugby league football. He won seven additional caps in 1962 against France (2 matches), Australia (3 matches), and New Zealand (2 matches).

== Outside of rugby league ==
Gerry Round attended Rishworth School, West Riding of Yorkshire in the 1950s, before beginning a 3-year civil engineering course at University of Leeds in 1958.
