= Ian Brooke =

English RL coach and former GB international rugby league footballer

Personal information
- Full name: Ian Brooke
- Born: 1 March 1943 (age 83) Plymouth, England

Playing information
- Position: Wing, Centre
Club
Years	Team	Pld	T	G	FG	P
1962–64	Wakefield Trinity	183	67
1964–67	Bradford Northern	83	21	0	0	63
1967–71	Wakefield Trinity
	Total	266	88	0	0	63
Representative
Years	Team	Pld	T	G	FG	P
1965–66	Yorkshire	3	1	0	0	3
1966–68	Great Britain	13	5	0	0	15

Coaching information
Club
Years	Team	Gms	W	D	L	W%
1973–75	Bradford Northern
1978–79	Wakefield Trinity
c. 1979–c. 80	Huddersfield
≤1995–≥95	Doncaster
	Total	0	0	0	0

Ian Brooke (born 1 March 1943) is an English former professional rugby league footballer who played in the 1960s and 1970s, and coached in the 1970s, 1980s and 1990s. He played at representative level for Great Britain, and at club level for Wakefield Trinity (two spells) (captain), and Bradford Northern, as a wing, or centre, and coached at club level for Bradford Northern, Wakefield Trinity, Huddersfield and Doncaster.

== Background ==
Born in Plymouth, Devon, Brooke was adopted as a baby and grew up in Wakefield.

== Playing career ==
=== Wakefield Trinity ===
Ian Brooke played at centre and scored a try in Wakefield Trinity's 25-10 victory over Wigan in the 1963 Challenge Cup Final during the 1962–63 season at Wembley Stadium, London on Saturday 11 May 1963, in front of a crowd of 84,492.

=== Bradford Northern ===
Brooke was transferred from Wakefield Trinity to Bradford Northern in the summer of 1964 for £2,750 (based on increases in average earnings, this would be approximately £96,360 in 2013).

Ian Brooke played at centre and scored a try in Bradford Northern's 17-8 victory over Hunslet in the 1965 Yorkshire Cup Final during the 1965–66 season at Headingley, Leeds on Saturday 16 October 1965.

=== Return to Wakefield ===
Ian Brooke played at centre and scored two tries in Wakefield Trinity's 21-9 victory over St. Helens in the Championship Final replay during the 1966–67 season at Station Road, Swinton on Wednesday 10 May 1967, and played in the 17-10 victory over Hull Kingston Rovers in the Championship Final during the 1967–68 season at Headingley, Leeds on Saturday 4 May 1968.

Brooke played at centre in the 10-11 defeat by Leeds in the 1968 Challenge Cup "Watersplash" Final during the 1967–68 season at Wembley Stadium, London on Saturday 11 May 1968, in front of a crowd of 87,100.

=== International honours ===
Brooke represented Great Britain while at Bradford Northern on the 1966 Lions tour, playing all three matches against Australia, and twice against New Zealand. He also won caps for Great Britain in 1967 against Australia (3 matches), in 1968 against France (2 matches), and in the 1968 Rugby League World Cup against Australia (1-try), France, and New Zealand (1-try).

== Coaching career ==
=== Challenge Cup Final appearances ===
Ian Brooke was the coach in Bradford Northern's 14-33 defeat by Featherstone Rovers in the 1973 Challenge Cup Final during the 1972–73 season at Wembley Stadium, London on Saturday 12 May 1973, in front of a crowd of 72,395.
