= Neil Fox (rugby league) =

GB & England international rugby league footballer & coach (born 1939)

Neil Fox CBE
Personal information
- Born: 4 May 1939 (age 87) Sharlston, England

Playing information
- Height: 6 ft 0 in (183 cm)
- Weight: 13 st 7 lb (86 kg)
- Position: Centre
Club
Years	Team	Pld	T	G	FG	P
1956–69	Wakefield Trinity	441	238	1442	0	3598
1969–70	Bradford Northern	26+1	4	11	0	34
1970–74	Wakefield Trinity	121+12	34	394	0	890
1974–75	Hull Kingston Rovers	59	16	210	2	470
1976	York	12+1	2	42	0	90
1976–77	Bramley	23	6	73	0	164
1977–78	Huddersfield	21	5	72	1	160
1978–79	Bradford Northern	31+12	8	73	1	171
	Total	760	313	2317	4	5577
Representative
Years	Team	Pld	T	G	FG	P
1958–68	Yorkshire	17	9	60	0	147
1962	England	1	1	3	0	9
1962	GB tour games	14+2	17	73	0	197
1959–69	Great Britain	29	14	93	0	228
1960	GB World Cup trial	1	0	2	0	4
1962	GB in South Africa	3	4	19	0	50
1962	Eastern Selected XIII	1	0	4	0	8

Coaching information
Club
Years	Team	Gms	W	D	L	W%
1970–74	Wakefield Trinity
1977–78	Huddersfield
	Total	0	0	0	0
- Father: Tom Fox
- Relatives: Don Fox (brother); Peter Fox (brother)

Neil Fox CBE (born 4 May 1939) is an English former rugby league footballer and player-coach who played in the 1950s, 1960s and 1970s, and coached in the 1970s and 1980s.

A left-footed goal-kicking centre, he set rugby league's all-time points record, scoring 6,220 points during his career. The brother of fellow rugby league players, Peter and Don Fox, Neil played for Yorkshire clubs Wakefield Trinity (two spells), Bradford Northern (two spells), Hull Kingston Rovers, York, Bramley and Huddersfield.

== Background ==
Fox was born in Sharlston, West Riding of Yorkshire, England.

He grew up supporting Huddersfield, and went on to sign for Wakefield Trinity at 16 years of age.

== Playing career ==
=== 1950s ===
In 1956, Fox became the joint fifth youngest player to make his début for Wakefield Trinity, aged 16 years and 3 months. Fox was selected for Yorkshire County XIII whilst at Wakefield Trinity during the 1958–59 and 1959–60 seasons. Fox played as a centre in Wakefield Trinity's 17–12 victory over Australia in a 1956–57 Kangaroo tour of Great Britain and France match at Belle Vue, Wakefield on Monday 10 December 1956. Fox scored 2 goals in Wakefield Trinity's 20–24 defeat by Leeds in the 1958–59 Yorkshire Cup Final at Odsal Stadium, Bradford on Saturday 18 October 1958 during the 1958–59 season. He made his international début in 1959, playing for Great Britain.

=== 1960s ===
Fox played at centre and scored two tries, and 7 goals in Wakefield Trinity's 38–5 victory over Hull F.C. in the 1959–60 Challenge Cup Final at Wembley Stadium, London on 14 May 1960 in front of a crowd of 79,773. This was a new record for most points in a Challenge Cup Final. This feat was equalled by Iestyn Harris (1 try and 8 goals) in Leeds Rhinos' victory over the London Broncos in the 1999 Challenge Cup Final. The next week, Fox played as a centre in Wakefield Trinity's 3–27 defeat by Wigan in the 1959–60 Championship final at Odsal Stadium on Saturday 21 May 1960.

Fox played centre, and scored two tries and two goals, in the 16–10 victory over Huddersfield in the 1960–61 Yorkshire Cup Final during the 1960–61 season at Headingley, Leeds on Saturday 29 October 1960. The following year, he again played at centre and scored 5 goals, in the 19–9 victory over Leeds in the 1961–62 Yorkshire Cup Final at Odsal Stadium on Saturday 11 November 1961.

Fox won the Lance Todd Trophy as man of the match in the 1961–62 Challenge Cup Final. He scored a try and kicked 3 drop-goals in the 12–6 victory over Huddersfield at Wembley Stadium on Saturday 12 May 1962, in front of a crowd of 81,263. In 1962, Fox played in his only appearance for England.

Fox played as a centre, and scored 5 goals in the 25–10 victory over Wigan in the 1962–63 Challenge Cup Final on Saturday 11 May 1963, in front of a crowd of 84,492.

Fox played as a centre and scored 2 tries and 3 goals in the 18–2 victory over Leeds in the 1964–65 Yorkshire Cup Final at Fartown, Huddersfield on Saturday 31 October 1964.

Fox played at centre and scored 3 goals in the 21–9 victory over St. Helens in the 1966-67 Championship Final replay during the 1966–67 season at Station Road, Swinton on Wednesday 10 May 1967, scored a try and 2 goals the 17–10 victory over Hull Kingston Rovers in the Championship Final during the 1967-68 season at Headingley, Leeds on Saturday 4 May 1968. 1968 was the final year Fox played for Yorkshire, having made 17 appearances since his début in 1958.

Off the field, circa-1968, Fox owned a Turf accountant's business in Goldthorpe. He left Wakefield Trinity for the first time in 1969, joining Bradford Northern. In 1969 he played in his final international match for Great Britain.

=== 1970s ===
Fox returned to Wakefield Trinity in 1970, where he moved to loose forward and became the coach. He scored a goal in Wakefield Trinity's 11–22 defeat by Halifax in the 1971–72 Player's No.6 Trophy Final at Odsal Stadium on Saturday 22 January 1972.

Fox coached Wakefield Trinity to a 2–7 defeat by Leeds in the 1973–74 Yorkshire Cup Final at Odsal Stadium on Saturday 20 October 1973.

He played second row in Wakefield Trinity's 13–16 loss to Hull in the 1974–75 Yorkshire Cup Final at Headingley, Leeds on Saturday 26 October 1974. He was substituted during the match, despite scoring 2 goals.

For the 1974–75 season, Fox joined Hull Kingston Rovers. He won the White Rose Trophy as man of the match in Hull KR's 11–15 defeat by Leeds in the 1975–76 Yorkshire Cup on Saturday 15 November 1975. Playing at right second row, Fox scored a try and kicked two goals during the match at Odsal Stadium.

Fox then briefly joined York in 1976, before playing with Bramley in 1976–77. He then spent the 1977–78 season with Huddersfield before rejoining Bradford Northern.

During the 1978–79 season, Fox played as a second-row, and scored 3 goals in Bradford Northern's 18–8 victory over York in the 1978–79 Yorkshire Cup Final at Headingley, Leeds on Saturday 28 October 1978. Fox holds the most goals in RFL Yorkshire Cup Finals with 19, and the most points with 53 points. Fox, Alex Murphy and Mark Forster are the only British rugby league footballers to have had two Testimonial matches. Fox's were both at Wakefield Trinity, in 1966 and 1979.

He was player-coach of Huddersfield Underbank Rangers, and achieved a Holliday Cup and promotion double in 1981–82. Fox retired with the record for most points scored in Anglo-Australian test match history until overtaken by Mal Meninga in 1992.

== Post playing ==
In the 1983 Birthday Honours, Fox was made a member of the Order of the British Empire (MBE) for his services to rugby league. Fox was inducted into the Rugby League Hall of Fame in 1989. On 30 August 2005 Fox, along with Billy Boston and Mick Sullivan, opened the Rugby League Heritage Centre.

In 2005 his autobiography was published by London League Publications Ltd.

On Thursday 20 August 2009, at a ceremony at Wheldon Road, the home of Castleford, Fox was named as part of the "Arriva Yorkshire Rugby League Dream Team" and had a bus named after him by Arriva Yorkshire. In 2010 he was awarded the Freedom of the City of Wakefield. The Wakefield Eastern Relief Road, opened in 2017, was named Neil Fox Way in his honour.

Fox is Patron of Second Chance Headway, a registered charity in Wakefield that supports people affected by brain injury.
