= Albert Tonkinson =

English rugby league footballer (1936–2022)

Personal information
- Full name: Albert L. Tonkinson
- Born: 1936 Pontefract district, England
- Died: 2022

Playing information
Club
Years	Team	Pld	T	G	FG	P
1957–64	Castleford	157	8	0	0	24
1964–65	Bradford Northern	26	0	0	0	0
	Total	183	8	0	0	24

Albert L. Tonkinson (1936 – 2022) was an English professional rugby league footballer who played in the 1950s and 1960s. He played at club level for Castleford and Bradford Northern. He made 157 appearances for Castleford and 26 appearances for Bradford Northern.

== Background ==
Albert Tonkinson's birth was registered in Pontefract district, West Riding of Yorkshire, England.
