= Kenneth Batty =

English rugby league footballer

Ken Batty
Personal information
- Full name: Kenneth Batty
- Born: c. 1945 (age 80–81)

Playing information
- Height: 5 ft 9 in (1.75 m)
- Weight: 12 st 1 lb (77 kg)

Rugby union
Club
Years	Team	Pld	T	G	FG	P
≤1966–66	West Park Leeds RUFC

Rugby league
- Position: Wing, Centre, Stand-off
Club
Years	Team	Pld	T	G	FG	P
1966–70	Wakefield Trinity	184
1971–73	St. George Dragons	26	4	0	0	12
	Total	210	4	0	0	12

Kenneth "Ken" Batty (born c. 1945) is a former rugby union and professional rugby league footballer who played in the 1960s and 1970s. He played club level rugby union (RU) for West Park Leeds RUFC, and club level rugby league (RL) for Wakefield Trinity, and St. George Dragons, as a wing, centre, or stand-off.

== Playing career ==
=== Championship final appearances ===
Ken Batty played on the wing in Wakefield Trinity's 17–10 victory over Hull Kingston Rovers in the Championship Final during the 1967-68 season at Headingley, Leeds on Saturday 4 May 1968.

=== Challenge Cup Final appearances ===
Ken Batty played on the wing in Wakefield Trinity's 10–11 defeat by Leeds in the 1968 Challenge Cup "Watersplash" Final during the 1967–68 season at Wembley Stadium, London on Saturday 11 May 1968, in front of a crowd of 87,100.

=== NRL Grand Final appearances ===
Ken Batty played on the wing in St. George Dragons' 10–16 defeat by South Sydney Rabbitohs in the NRL Grand Final Final during the 1971 NSWRFL season at Sydney Cricket Ground on Saturday 18 September 1971.
