= Kenneth Hirst =

English rugby league footballer

Ken Hirst
Personal information
- Full name: Kenneth Hirst
- Born: 4 June 1940 Morley, Leeds, England
- Died: 20 December 2008 (aged 68) Ossett, Wakefield, England

Playing information
- Height: 5 ft 9 in (1.75 m)
- Weight: 12 st 6 lb (79 kg)

Rugby union
Club
Years	Team	Pld	T	G	FG	P
1955±–56	Morley R.F.C.

Rugby league
- Position: Wing
Club
Years	Team	Pld	T	G	FG	P
1956–69	Wakefield Trinity	142	100	0	0	300

Kenneth "Ken" Hirst (4 June 1940 – 20 December 2008) was an English rugby union, and professional rugby league footballer who played in the 1950s and 1960s. He played club level rugby union (RU) for Morley R.F.C., and club level rugby league (RL) for Leeds Schools and Wakefield Trinity, as a wing, .

== Background ==
Hirst was born in Morley, Leeds, West Riding of Yorkshire, England, and he died in Ossett, Wakefield, West Yorkshire, England.

== Playing career ==
=== Championship final appearances ===
Ken Hirst played on the wing scored a try in Wakefield Trinity's 21–9 victory over St. Helens in the Championship Final replay during the 1966–67 season at Station Road, Swinton on Wednesday 10 May 1967.

=== Challenge Cup Final appearances ===
Ken Hirst played on the wing and scored a try in Wakefield Trinity's 12–6 victory over Huddersfield in the 1961–62 Challenge Cup Final during the 1961–62 season at Wembley on Saturday 12 May 1962, and played on the wing and scored two tries in the 10–11 defeat by Leeds in the 1967–68 Challenge Cup "Watersplash" Final during the 1967–68 season at Wembley Stadium, London on Saturday 11 May 1968, in front of a crowd of 87,100.

=== Notable tour matches ===
Ken Hirst played on the wing, making his début, and beat Clive Churchill to score a try within the first two minutes in Wakefield Trinity's 17–12 victory over Australia in the 1956–57 Kangaroo tour of Great Britain and France match at Belle Vue, Wakefield on Monday 10 December 1956.

=== Club career ===
Ken Hirst is the third youngest player to make his début for Wakefield Trinity aged 16 years and 6 months in 1956, second youngest player being Ernest Pollard, and the youngest player being Richard Goddard.

== Outside of Rugby League ==
Following his retirement from rugby league, Ken and his wife Irene were the landlord and lady of The Tawny Owl Inn, Prospect Road, Ossett for twenty years. They also have 1 son, Alex, and 2 grandchildren, Evie and Sam.
