= Bev Risman =

GB international rugby league footballer (1937–2023)

Bev Risman OBE
Personal information
- Full name: Augustus Beverley Walter Risman
- Born: 23 November 1937 Salford, Lancashire, England
- Died: 22 June 2023 (aged 85)

Playing information

Rugby union
- Position: Fly Half
Representative
Years	Team	Pld	T	G	FG	P
1959–61	England	8	0	3	0	8
1959	British Lions	4	2	2	0	10

Rugby league
- Position: Stand-off, Fullback
Club
Years	Team	Pld	T	G	FG	P
1960–66	Leigh	140	31	241	0	575
1966–70	Leeds	164	20	611		1282
	Total	304	51	852	0	1857
Representative
Years	Team	Pld	T	G	FG	P
1968	Great Britain	5	2	17	0	40

Coaching information
Club
Years	Team	Gms	W	D	L	W%
1987–88	Fulham RLFC	0	0	0	0
- Father: Gus Risman
- Relatives: John Risman (brother)

Augustus Beverley Walter Risman OBE (23 November 1937 – 22 June 2023) was an English rugby union and rugby league player and rugby league coach. A dual-code international, he played rugby union for England and the British Lions, and rugby league for Great Britain.

== Background ==
Bev Risman was born in Salford, Lancashire, England.

Risman was the son of the rugby league player Gus Risman, the older brother of the rugby league player John Risman, and the father of John M. Risman, who was the first open double Blue. He achieved his double Blue at the University of Oxford, in both the rugby union Varsity Match, and the 1984 rugby league Varsity Match.

== Playing career ==
Bev Risman played rugby union at fly-half for England (8 Test appearances) and for the British Lions (4 Test appearances). His international début was in 1959 for England against Wales. His last international rugby union appearance was in 1961.

Switching codes, he played for Leigh, Leeds and Lancashire. He won both the Challenge Cup and Championship with Leeds and represented Great Britain in five Test appearances. He captained the Great Britain squad in the 1968 Rugby League World Cup where he earned three of his caps.

== Coaching career ==
After retiring he became involved in coach education, the development of the game in the South of England and the organisation of student rugby league. He was inducted to the rugby league Roll of Honour in 2005, and was elected President of the Rugby Football League in 2010. He was replaced by Jim Hartley in 2011.

== Personal life and death ==
Risman was appointed Officer of the Order of the British Empire (OBE) in the 2012 New Year Honours for services to rugby league.

Risman died on 22 June 2023, at the age of 85.
