= Sharlston =

Village and civil parish in West Yorkshire, England

Coordinates: 53.669968°N 1.41346°W

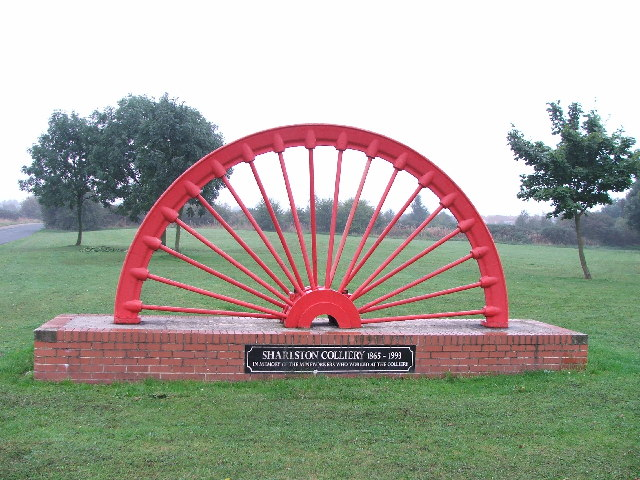
- Sharlston winding wheel

- Location within West Yorkshire
- Population: 2,663 (2011 census)
- OS grid reference: SE3884919437
- Civil parish: Sharlston
- Metropolitan borough: City of Wakefield
- Metropolitan county: West Yorkshire
- Region: Yorkshire and the Humber
- Country: England
- Sovereign state: United Kingdom
- Post town: WAKEFIELD
- Postcode district: WF4
- Dialling code: 01924
- Police: West Yorkshire
- Fire: West Yorkshire
- Ambulance: Yorkshire
- UK Parliament: Hemsworth

Sharlston is a village and civil parish, situated 4 miles (6.4 km) east of Wakefield in West Yorkshire, England, and includes the settlements of Old Sharlston, Sharlston Common and New Sharlston. Its population at the 2001 census was 2,756, reducing to 2,663 at the 2011 Census. The village lies in the City of Wakefield unitary district.

== History ==
The name Sharlston derives from the Old English Scearfstūn meaning 'Scearf's settlement'. The 'f' developed into an 'l' through misassociation with the name Charles.

The village of Old Sharlston has existed for over seven hundred years, with the oldest known record indicating that Sharlston Old Hall was built in 1574. In the early 18th century, the village was acquired by the Earl of Westmorland.

Sharlston's listed buildings and structures are grouped around Grade II* Sharlston Hall, a manor house of 15th century origin with later additions, and include the hall's entrance gateway.

Until April 1929 Sharlston formed part of the Warmfield parish, but is now managed by its own parish council.

=== Pit village ===
A pit or model village of more than 150 back-to-back houses was built at New Sharlston from 1864 to house Sharlston Colliery Company workers. The houses cost just over £100 each and the streets were named Long Row, Crossley Street and High Street. A Methodist chapel and a day school were built on Crossley Street. The properties became the property of the National Coal Board in 1947. In 1961 twenty eight back-to-back houses were converted into 14 through houses. The school and the chapel have been demolished. A railway station was built in 1869 to service the new pit village, but this was closed in 1958; the nearest station is now Streethouse.

New Sharlston has witnessed rapid decline since the 1984-85 miners' strike which hit Sharlston and its surrounding villages hard.

== Development ==
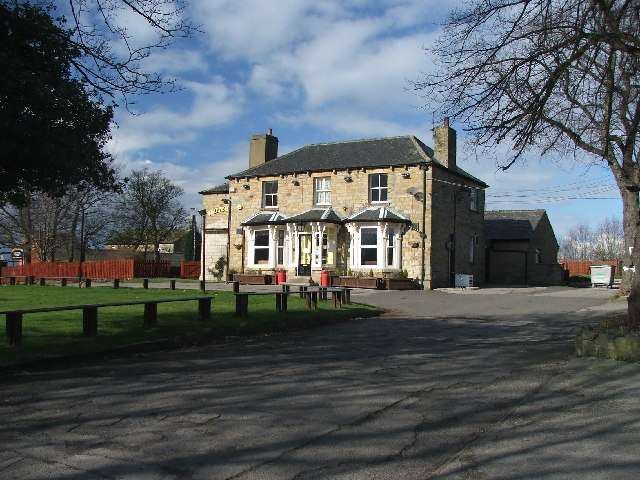
White Horse pub at Sharlston.

In 2011 the village old people's home was demolished and replaced with newly built housing for rent and sale. A village public house, The Sharlston, has closed, the building being converted to a pharmacy.

== Sport ==
The village has an amateur rugby league team, Sharlston Rovers, which recently won the Wakefield Division 2 Cup. There is also a juniors team, the teams in 2017 are under 11s, under 9s, under 8s, under 7s, under 6s, under 5s and tots.

From 2011-2018, Sharlston Welfare Football Club competed in the Selby League, playing rivals such as Castleford Town Gold and Gilberdyke.
