= 1967–68 Challenge Cup =

Rugby league competition

- Duration: 5 Rounds
- Number of teams: 32
- Winners: Leeds
- Runners-up: Wakefield Trinity
- Lance Todd Trophy: Don Fox

The 1967–68 Challenge Cup was the 67th staging of rugby league's oldest knockout competition, the Challenge Cup. The final was contested by Leeds and Wakefield Trinity at Wembley, with Leeds winning 11–10.

== First round ==
All 30 professional clubs entered the first round of the Challenge Cup, plus two amateur teams – Hull BOCM, and Leigh Miners. Matches took place on 2–4 February 1968. The match between Workington Town and Whitehaven was postponed until 7 February due to the weather.

Tie no	Home team	Score	Away team
1	Barrow	4–8	Wakefield Trinity
2	Dewsbury	3–12	Bradford Northern
3	Doncaster	9–10	Widnes
4	Hull	3–10	Wigan
5	Hull BOCM	6–39	Castleford
6	Hull Kingston Rovers	0–9	Featherstone Rovers
7	Hunslet	4–9	Oldham
8	Keighley	7–2	Batley
9	Leeds	23–12	Liverpool City
10	Leigh	11–5	Warrington
11	Leigh Miners	7–24	Halifax
12	Salford	16–5	Blackpool Borough
13	St. Helens	0–5	Huddersfield
14	Swinton	5–13	Bramley
15	Workington Town	5–2	Whitehaven
16	York	24–2	Rochdale Hornets

== Second round ==
Matches in the second round were played on 25 February 1968. One game also went to a replay, which took place on 28 February 1968.

Tie no	Home team	Score	Away team
1	Bradford Northern	7–7	Oldham
Replay	Oldham	12–2	Bradford Northern
2	Featherstone Rovers	12–0	York
3	Halifax	5–23	Huddersfield
4	Leeds	29–0	Bramley
5	Leigh	2–20	Wigan
6	Salford	4–8	Wakefield Trinity
7	Widnes	5–15	Keighley
8	Workington Town	2–7	Castleford

== Third round ==
Matches in the third round were played on 16–17 March 1968.

Tie no	Home team	Score	Away team
1	Huddersfield	9–7	Featherstone Rovers
2	Keighley	2–11	Wigan
3	Oldham	0–13	Leeds
4	Wakefield Trinity	18–5	Castleford

== Semi final ==
30 March 1968

Wakefield Trinity	0 – 0	Huddersfield

Odsal Stadium, Bradford
Referee: D.T.H. Davies (Pendlebury)

6 April 1968

Leeds	25 – 4	Wigan
Try: Atkinson, Hynes, Ramsey, Seabourne, Watson; Goal: Risman (5)	Report	Goal: Tyrer (2)

Station Road, Swinton
Referee: Fred Lindop (Wakefield)

=== Replay ===
3 April 1968

Wakefield Trinity	15 – 10	Huddersfield
Try: Coetzer (2), Batty; Goal: Fox (3)		Try: Valentine, Rhodes; Goal: Rhodes (2)

Headingley, Leeds
Referee: D.T.H. Davies (Pendlebury)

== Final ==
11 May 1968

Leeds	11 – 10	Wakefield Trinity
Try: Atkinson; Goal: Risman (4)	Report	Try: Hirst (2); Goal: Fox (2)

Wembley, London
Attendance: 87,100
Referee: John Hebblethwaite (York)
Player of the Match: Don Fox
