= Wakefield Trinity =

English professional rugby league football club

Club information
- Full name: Wakefield Trinity Rugby League Football Club
- Nickname: The Dreadnoughts / Mighty Trin / Wildcats
- Short name: Trinity
- Colours: Red, white and blue
- Founded: 1873; 153 years ago
- Website: wakefieldtrinity.com

Current details
- Ground: Belle Vue (The DIY Kitchens Stadium) (9,252)
- CEO: Craig Barrass
- Chairman: Matt Ellis
- Coach: Daryl Powell
- Captain: Mike McMeeken
- Competition: Super League
- 2026 Season: 4th (Champions)
- Current season

Uniforms
Home colours	Away colours	Third colours

Records
- Championships: 3 (1967, 1968, 2026)
- Challenge Cups: 5 (1909, 1946, 1960, 1962, 1963)
- Other top-tier honours: 18
- Most capped: 619 – Harry Wilkinson
- Highest points scorer: 4,488 – Neil Fox

Wakefield Trinity is a professional rugby league club in Wakefield, West Yorkshire, England. The club play their home fixtures at the DIY Kitchen Stadium, Belle Vue and compete in the Super League, the top tier of the British rugby league system, in which they are reigning champions.

The club was one of the original twenty-two clubs that formed the Northern Rugby Football Union in 1895. They have won the League Championship on three occasions (they are reigning champions after winning the 2026 Super League title) and the Challenge Cup five times.

Wakefield have local rivalries with Castleford Tigers and Featherstone Rovers as well as Leeds Rhinos. Their traditional kit colours are white with a red and blue band across the torso, or white with a red and blue V. Between 1999 and 2016 the club was known as Wakefield Trinity Wildcats.

== History ==
=== Early years ===
The club's predecessor was The Young Mens Society, formed in 1867 by the Holy Trinity Church to promote sports, with the team itself formed in 1873 alongside a similarly named athletics club, Wakefield Trinity Cycling and Athletic Club (now Wakefield District Harriers and Athletics Club). Early matches were played at Heath Common (1873), Manor Field (1875–76) and Elm Street (1877) before the club moved to Belle Vue in 1879.

After the 1890–91 season, Wakefield along with other Yorkshire Senior clubs Batley, Bradford, Brighouse, Dewsbury, Halifax, Huddersfield, Hull, Hunslet, Leeds, Liversedge, Manningham decided that they wanted their own county league starting in 1891 along the lines of a similar competition that had been played in Lancashire. The clubs wanted full control of the league but the Yorkshire Rugby Football Union would not sanction the competition as it meant giving up control of rugby football to the senior clubs.

Before the schism of 1895 which led to the formation of the Northern Rugby Union, Wakefield Trinity participated nine times in thirteen years in the final of the Yorkshire Cup.

They were one of the 22 clubs to form the Northern Union after the acrimonious split from the Rugby Football Union in 1895.

Belle Vue was purchased in 1895, in order to provide a permanent base for Trinity. The money was provided by the Wakefield Trinity Cycling and Athletic Club and was also initially used for cycling and athletics competitions. The athletic club split from the rugby club as a result of the split from the Rugby Football Union and in 1896 formed a separate limited company to avoid accusations of professionalism, although they continued to use Belle Vue until the 1920s.

Trinity won the Northern Union Challenge Cup for the first time in 1909, beating Hull F.C. 17–0 at Headingley. The corresponding 1914 final saw the result reversed, with Hull winning 6–0.

Jonty Parkin signed for Wakefield Trinity as a 17-year-old in 1913. Wakefield closed for the 1915–16 season but recommenced playing in 1916 following the introduction of conscription which meant that would not be accused of keeping men from volunteering for the First World War.

In a quiet time for Trinity, they won only one Yorkshire Cup (in 1924–25 against Batley) but lost in the final four times.

Parkin decided he wanted to leave in 1930, at the age of thirty-four, and he was put on the transfer list at £100. Hull Kingston Rovers would not find the money; so Parkin paid the fee himself to secure his release. The game's bylaws were adjusted shortly afterwards, so that players could no longer do that.

On Saturday 27 October 1934, Leeds and Wakefield Trinity met in the final of the Yorkshire Cup at Crown Flatt, Dewsbury. The match ended in a 5–5 draw. Four days later the two clubs drew again, with Leeds eventually lifting the trophy after a second replay, the only occasion it took three attempts to settle a Yorkshire Cup Final. A total of 52,402 spectators watched the three games.

As of 2025, the 1943–44 season is the only occasion that Wakefield Trinity have finished top of the league.

In 1947, Wakefield Trinity centre Frank Townsend was fatally injured in a match at Post Office Road, Featherstone.

=== Post-war ===
On Saturday, 3 November 1945, Bradford Northern met Wakefield Trinity in the final of the Yorkshire Cup held at Thrum Hall, Halifax. Wakefield began the match as favourites, they had lost only one of thirteen matches thus far in the season. However, Bradford won 5–2 and lifted the Yorkshire Cup for the fourth time in six seasons. The first Wembley final after the war produced a return to winning ways as Trinity, with names such as James "Jim" Croston and Billy Stott, pipped Wigan to the Cup 13–12.

On Saturday 27 October 1951, 25,495 were at Fartown, Huddersfield to see Wakefield Trinity defeat Keighley 17–3 in the Yorkshire Cup Final. The club was not destined to return to Wembley until 1960 and had to slake its thirst for silverware on two Yorkshire Cup and two Yorkshire League victories in the 1950s. Trinity featured in the first league match to be broadcast on British television, a clash with Wigan at Central Park on 12 January 1952.

=== 1960s and 1970s ===
Trinity were runners-up in the league championship in 1959–60, losing in the Championship Final against Wigan.

Wakefield Trinity beat Huddersfield 16–10 in the 1960 Yorkshire County Cup Final at Headingley, Leeds on 29 October 1960.

Wakefield returned to Wembley emphatically with a record 38–5 win v Hull F.C. under the guidance of coach Ken Traill and loose forward Derek 'Rocky' Turner.

Wakefield won their fourth Challenge Cup victory in 1962, running out 12–6 winners against Huddersfield. Many of the scenes from the film This Sporting Life were filmed at the Belle Vue during Wakefield's third round Challenge Cup match against Wigan. The club were victorious in a dour 1962 Challenge Cup win over Huddersfield although the Fartowners went on to deny them the double a few days later in the Championship final at Odsal Stadium, Bradford. Wakefield also won the Yorkshire Cup final of 1961–62 and the Yorkshire League of 1961–62.

Wakefield Trinity was invited to visit South Africa during June and July 1962. Neil Fox, Harold Poynton, Gerry Round, Derek Turner and Jack Wilkinson, were unable to accompany the team on the six-match tour, as they were in Australia with the GB tourists. Wakefield Trinity's Chairman Stuart Hadfield was also touring with the national team as Great Britain manager. Trinity therefore added four South African players who were playing for British clubs at that time to their squad. They were Fred Griffiths (Wigan), Tom van Vollenhoven (St. Helens), Wilf Rosenberg (Hull F.C.) and Edward "Ted" Brophy (Leigh). Wakefield had three South Africans of their own in the squad in Alan Skene, Jan Prinsloo and Colin Greenwood, with the rest of the party made up of Fred Smith, Ken Hirst, Ken Rollin, Keith Holliday, Dennis Williamson, Milan Kosanović, Geoff Oakes, Brian Briggs, Albert Firth and Don Vines. They were winners of all six matches. The tour opened on Saturday 30 June 1962 at Milner Park, Johannesburg, where the local Johannesburg Celtic club were overpowered by 52–6.

Despite winning the Challenge Cup for a fifth time in 1963, Wakefield had still not been able to secure the league championship title. The Holy Grail would be achieved in the 1966–67 season when the experienced Harold Poynton led a powerful side, which included Neil Fox, Don Fox, Gary Cooper and Ray Owen, to victory over St. Helens in a replay of the championship final. They repeated the title feat the following year against Hull Kingston Rovers but were again denied the double when Leeds defeated them in the 1968 'water splash' final at Wembley, a match played during a downpour that saturated the pitch. The game produced the most dramatic of finishes, when Man-of-the-Match, Don Fox had an under-the-posts conversion to win it for Wakefield, but "topped it" on the saturated turf and missed, to leave Leeds 11–10 winners.

Trinity were crowned Champions for the only time in successive seasons – 1966–67 and 1967–68. Wakefield Trinity beat St. Helens 21–9 in the 1967 Rugby Football League Championship Final at Station Road, Swinton on 10 May 1967, with scrum half Ray Owen winning the Harry Sunderland Trophy. The following season they retained their title in the 17–10 victory over Hull F.C. in the 1968 Championship Final at Headingley on 4 May 1968, this time with Gary Cooper taking home the man of the match award. Wakefield now wear two gold stars above the club crest to signify the two titles won.

Wakefield absorbed a number of different coaches at the helm in subsequent years but did not return to Wembley until William "Bill" Kirkbride's talented charges fell 12–3 to Widnes in 1979 in front of nearly 100,000 fans.

=== 1980s ===
Bill Ashurst coached Wakefield Trinity while still playing during the 1981–82 season.

Derek Turner was Head Coach for Wakefield Trinity from July 1983 until February 1984. As of 2017, 11th in the Second Division during the 1984–85 season is the lowest position that Wakefield Trinity have ever finished. In December 1985, Wakefield did a deal with the local council to enable them to continue at Belle Vue. Five council delegates joined Wakefield's board giving them the majority vote.

The ensuing decline was temporarily halted when Wally Lewis signed up for a brief spell with the club, playing as a stand-off. But Trinity continued to fluctuate between the two divisions.

Former player David Topliss stabilised the Dreadnoughts' ship in 1987. He won immediate promotion in 1988 back to the First Division, retiring as a player after the final match of the campaign. He remained at Wakefield purely as a coach and consolidated the club's top tier status by acquiring the services of seasoned internationals like Steve Ella, new captain Mark Graham, Brian Jackson as well as now former Trinity coach Andy Kelly and later John Harbin.

Wakefield escaped a threat of closure by forming their first ever board of directors in August 1991. Topliss stepped down as coach to concentrate on his business. David Hobbs joined Wakefield Trinity as coach in May 1994. He then went to Halifax as Director of Football in January 1995.

=== 1996–1997: Summer era ===
In 1996, the first tier of British rugby league clubs played the inaugural Super League season and changed from a winter to a summer season. When the Rupert Murdoch-funded Super League competition had been proposed, part of the deal was that some traditional clubs would merge. Wakefield were down to merge with Castleford and Featherstone Rovers to form a new club, Calder, which would compete in the newly formed Super League. Although Wakefield voted to merge, the other clubs refused to do so; Wakefield finished below the cut-off point of 10th in the existing top flight and were excluded from the new Super League. As the sport in Britain entered a new era, it would be three years before Wakefield rose again to the top level of the game.

=== 1998–2005: Entry to Super League ===
Under coach Andy Kelly, Wakefield earned their place in the top flight on the back of their controversial victory over Featherstone Rovers in the inaugural Division One Grand Final in 1998. Wakefield adopted the "Wildcats" nickname in 1998: the year they entered Super League, having won promotion from the first division.

Wakefield put together a startling series of results early in the 1999 season, beating some of the most fancied sides and ensuring early in the campaign that they would be safe. The club invested heavily in newcomers. Wakefield also played one of their televised home games at Barnsley F.C's Oakwell stadium against St. Helens.

John Harbin was the coach of Wakefield between October 2000 and October 2001, Wakefield's final game of the 2001 season was a relegation battle with Salford with Wakefield condemning Huddersfield to relegation. He decided to leave the club at the end of 2001.

Peter Roe was appointed Head Coach in November 2001. After years of struggling to keep up with the Super League pace which saw Trinity finish next to bottom on most of their attempts they finally got around to making headway up the league. Peter Roe was sacked in July 2002 and was replaced by his assistant Shane McNally. With Adrian Vowles as his co-coach the pair guided Trinity to their first-ever SL play-off position, finishing in 6th place.

In 2004, after a slow start to the season Trinity finished stronger than any other team in the competition giving their fans some hope of a little glory at the club which had been missing for too long. Away at the KC Stadium in Hull, Trinity produced a remarkable performance and managed to beat Hull despite having two men sin-binned.

The semis saw a visit to Wigan and a positive result was needed for Wakefield to make the elimination final play off. All looked to be going that way with Trinity leading 14–0 but Wigan mounted a comeback.

Shane McNally was sacked in June 2005 after a disappointing start to the season. Tony Smith took over as caretaker coach from Shane McNally and led Trinity to survival in 2005 but following four straight defeats which saw Wakefield drop into the relegation zone Smith was sacked on Monday, 17 July 2006. Smith's last game in charge was a 26–20 defeat against Huddersfield, a match in which his side squandered a 20-point lead – one of several occasions that season Trinity where collapsed in the second half.

On 24 July 2006, Wakefield announced former Hull F.C. coach John Kear as Head Coach until the end of the season.

Trinity defeated their arch-rivals Castleford by 29–17 at Belle Vue on Saturday 16 September 2006 to preserve their Super League status in an epic match which saw both teams leading for spells of the game. Had Wakefield not won the match they would have been relegated. Instead, their win, dubbed as the 'Battle of Belle Vue' sent Castleford down to the National League One. The match was attended by a sell out crowd of 11,000.

In November 2006 the Wakefield Metropolitan District Council set out plans for a new sporting village to be built at Thornes Park that would incorporate a new stadium to be used by Trinity, along with gymnastics and boxing facilities and swimming pools. The council published results of a feasibility study on 12 September 2008, into the project and which concluded that it is not feasible for a new stadium at Thornes Park.

That left Wakefield Trinity in a precarious position – Belle Vue is not suitable for the long-term future, and a new stadium is crucial to their Super League survival. In 2009 a new stadium in Stanley was proposed with planning permission expected to be applied for in October 2009. Planning permission was granted for the new ground in Newmarket, subject to section 106 agreements, and since this news the club yet again stalled in progress.

The 2009 season was Wakefield's best-ever Super League season with the club finishing 5th on 32 points and qualifying for a home tie in the end of season play-offs.

2009 also saw Tony Drury, the clubs Head of Youth Development and England Academy Head Coach, lead the Wakefield Wildcats Academy team to the double. Winning both, the Super League-League Leaders Shield and going on to win the Super League Academy Grand Final against a strong Wigan Warriors team, many of whom have gone on to be leading names in the Super League, NRL and on the International stage.

=== 2010–2015: Financial difficulties ===
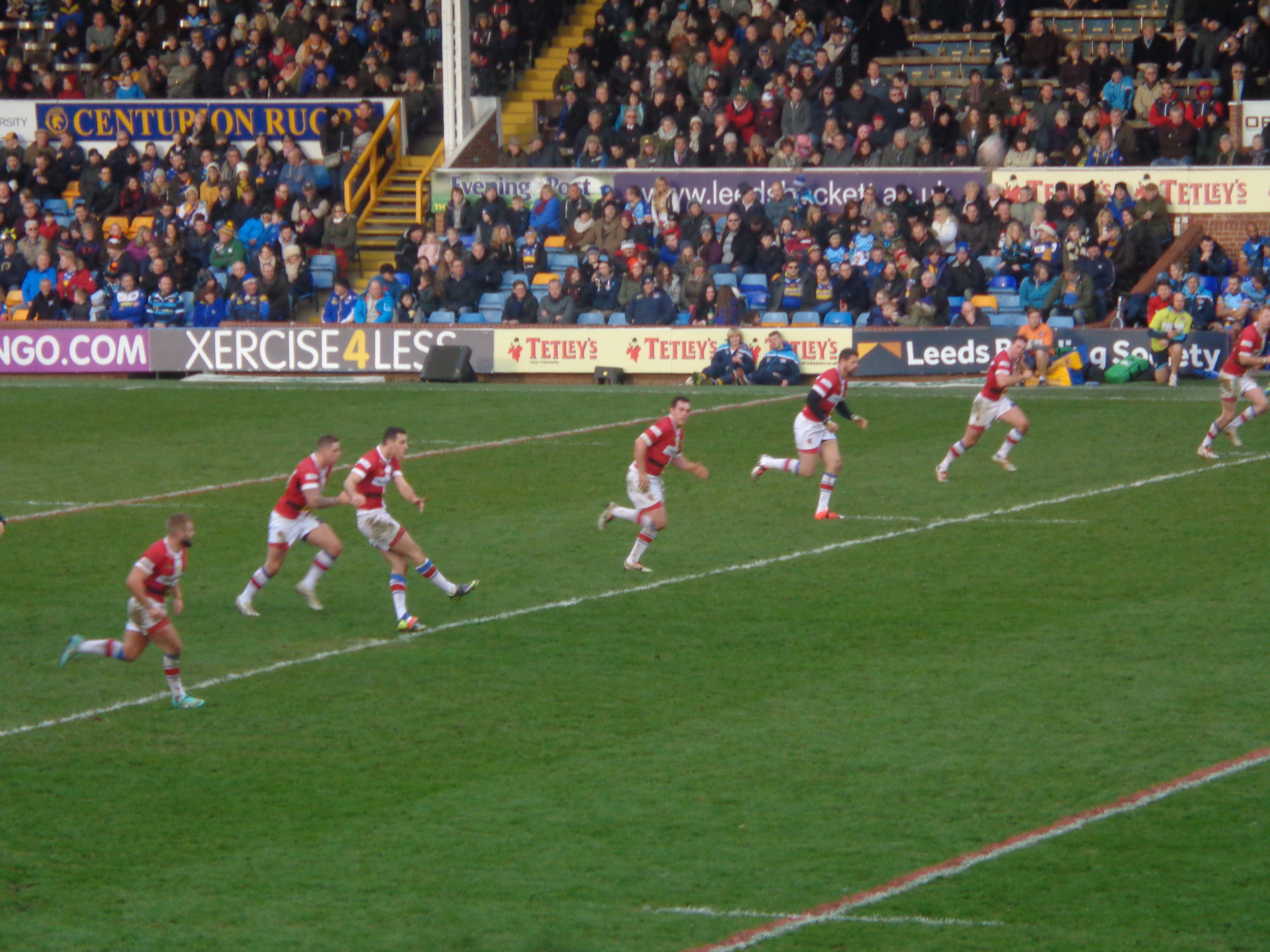
Wakefield Trinity playing Leeds in a friendly in 2014.

2010 was a disappointment to the club, after losing Shane Tronc, Terry Newton and Danny Brough, and despite bringing in Danny Kirmond, Charlie Leaeno and Julien Rinaldi, they still finished in 10th position, five places lower than the 2009 season.

In February 2011, the club entered administration to avoid a winding up petition from HMRC over £300,000 in unpaid taxes.

Former Hull coach Richard Agar became Wakefield Trinity's head coach before the start of the 2012 Super League XVII season, on a three-year deal.

Agar was replaced by James Webster after a poor run of form in June 2014. Webster was sacked halfway into the 2015 season just before the Qualifiers started and was replaced by Brian Smith. They went on to win the inaugural Million Pound Game against Bradford Bulls to play another season in Super League. Smith resigned in March 2016.

=== 2016–2023: Struggles and Relegation from the Super League ===
Chris Chester was appointed head coach 16 March 2016 and revitalised the squad. Compared to the previous season when the team were fighting for survival, Chester guided them to a top eight finish and a place in the Challenge Cup semi final, with Wakefield making the top eight for a second year in a row in 2017. In 2018, Wakefield finished 7th on the table at the end of the Super League XXIII season, finishing 5th at the end of the Super 8's.

In the 2019 Super League season, the club finished ninth on the table, and in the COVID-affected 2020 Super League season, the club finished second from bottom after a difficult campaign. In the 2021 Super League season, Wakefield Trinity finished 10th and, towards the end of the season, sacked head coach Chris Chester, replacing him with Willie Poching.

Wakefield endured a difficult 2022 Super League season with the club struggling near the foot of the table. Following the clubs Magic Weekend loss to Toulouse Olympique, Wakefield found themselves in the relegation zone. However, the club won five of their remaining seven matches to avoid relegation and finish in 10th place. On 12 September 2022, head coach Willie Poching announced he was departing Wakefield Trinity.

Wakefield Trinity started the 2023 Super League season poorly losing their opening nine matches in a row. Wakefield also became the first side of the Super League era to be held scoreless in five games throughout a season after losing 32–0 to the Leigh Leopards in round 9. Wakefield recorded their first win of the campaign in Round 15, defeating Leeds 24–14. In the second last round of the 2023 Super League season, Wakefield were officially relegated after losing 20–19 in golden point extra-time against Leigh, ending Wakefield's 24-year stay in the top flight.

Following their relegation from Super League, Wakefield Trinity were taken over by local businessman Matt Ellis in September 2023. Ellis, owner of DIY Kitchens, purchased the club and its Belle Vue stadium, bringing an end to years of financial uncertainty and pledging significant investment in both the playing squad and facilities. Soon after completing the takeover, Ellis appointed former Castleford Tigers and Warrington Wolves coach Daryl Powell as head coach on a four-year deal, tasking him with leading a comprehensive rebuild of the club on and off the field. Their partnership was viewed as a turning point for Wakefield Trinity, signalling a new era of ambition and stability for the club.

=== 2023–present: The Matt Ellis Era and Super League Triumph ===
In 2024, Wakefield Trinity performed well in their return to the RFL Championship. Under Powell's leadership, the team went on to win the 1895 Cup and finish top of the Championship, losing only one match throughout the regular season. They then reached the Championship Grand Final against Toulouse Olympique, winning 36–0 to claim the title. On 24 October 2024, Wakefield Trinity were promoted back to the Super League through the IMG Grading system, receiving an A rating and replacing the London Broncos.

In the 2025 Super League season, their first back in the Betfred Super League, Wakefield Trinity finished sixth, qualifying for the playoffs — their first in 13 years — before being defeated by Leigh in the eliminator. They became one of the few clubs to achieve promotion and then reach the playoffs immediately. The club maintained their A rating for the 2026 season.

In the 2026 Super League season, Wakefield Trinity continued their progress under Powell, finishing fourth in the regular season, their highest-ever Super League finish. In the play-offs, Trinity defeated Leigh Leopards 26–16 at the DIY Kitchens Stadium to reach the Super League semi-finals for the first time in the club's history. They then travelled to face League Leaders' Shield winners Wigan Warriors at the Brick Community Stadium, where they recorded a 33–6 victory to qualify for their first-ever Super League Grand Final.

In the Grand Final at Old Trafford on 3 October 2026, Trinity defeated Warrington Wolves 23–10 to win their first Super League title and their first league championship since 1968. Wakefield led 19–0 at half-time following tries from Cameron Scott, Isaiah Vagana and Jazz Tevaga, with Jack Sinfield adding a drop goal shortly before the interval. Warrington responded in the second half, but a try from Tom Johnstone helped Trinity secure the victory. Johnstone was awarded the Rob Burrow Award as player of the match. The victory made Wakefield the sixth club to win the Super League title. The match was watched by a sell-out crowd of 71,728, the largest Super League Grand Final attendance since 2017.

The Super League title completed a remarkable turnaround for the club, which had been relegated from Super League in 2023 and competed in the 2nd tier RFL Championship as recently as 2024. Under owner Matt Ellis and head coach Daryl Powell, Trinity returned to Super League in 2025, reached the play-offs in their first season back and became Super League champions the following year.

== Crest and colours ==
=== Crest ===
Old crest

Every crest up until 1999 focused on the fleur-de-lys present on the Wakefield County Borough coat of arms. When the club was rebranded the Wildcats the fleur-de-lys was dropped although the club was still called Wakefield Trinity Wildcats. the new crest was the wildcat with Wildcats predominantly showing. In 2012 the crest was tweaked to contain the club's full name and the fleur-de-lys symbol. The Wildcats name was still used, but from 2015 the fleur-de-lys featured inside a shield with two stars above it for the two Championship titles they have won. In 2017 the Club reverted to the name Wakefield Trinity and the club badge has been returned to a white fleur-de-Lys in a blue shield with the founding date of 1873 proudly displayed.

=== Colours ===
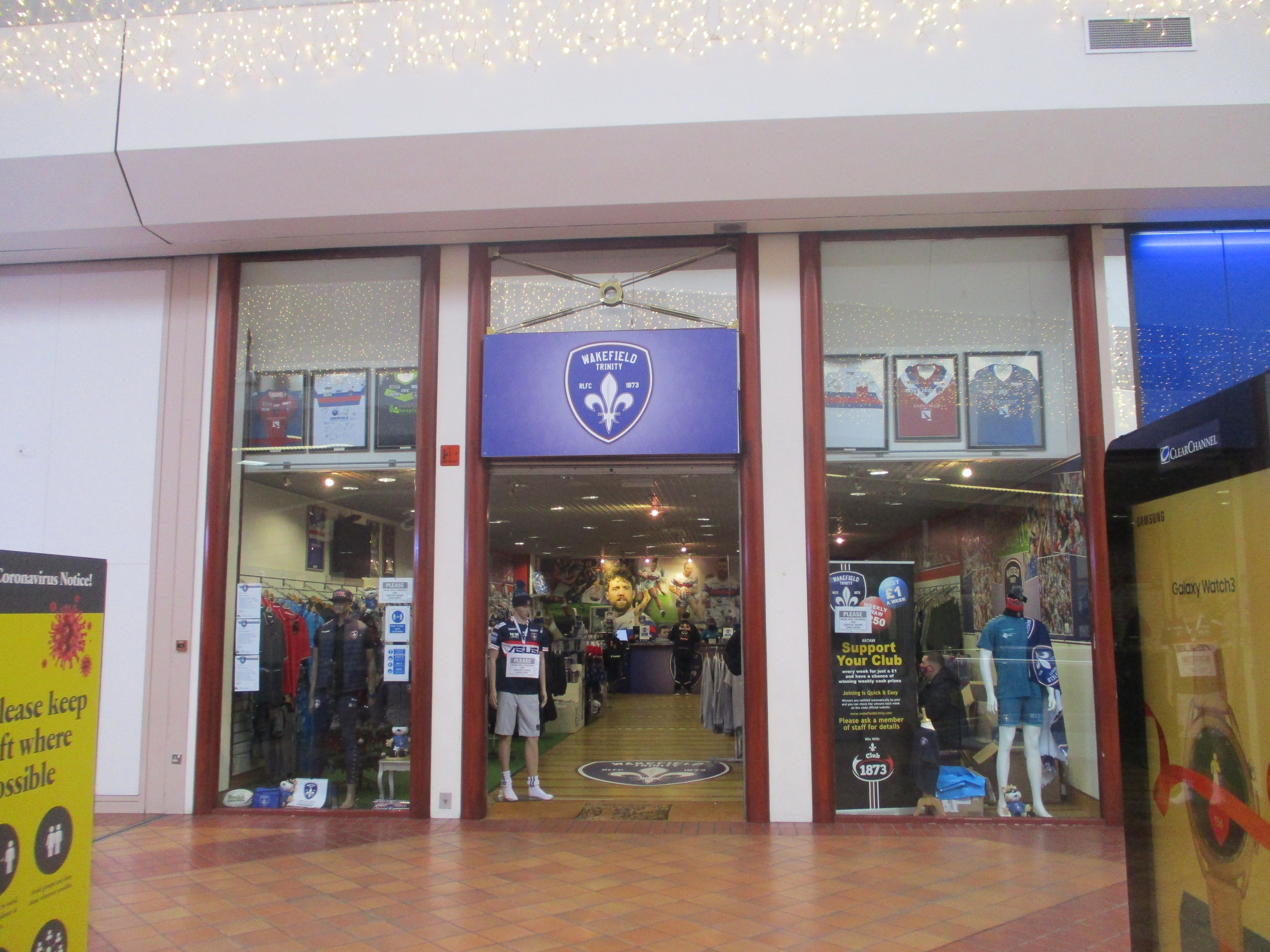
Former club shop in the Ridings Centre which has since relocated to the Stadium

Wakefield Trinity's colours are red, white and blue. Traditionally most of their kits are predominantly white with a blue and red hoop across the torso or alternatively white with a blue and red V. Some kits have been predominantly blue or red with varying accents/patterns.

== Kit sponsors and manufacturers ==
Year	Kit Manufacturer	Main Shirt Sponsor
1968–1980	Adidas	none
1980–1993	Adidas	British Coal
1993–1995	Adidas	McEwans Lager
1995–1997	Le Coq Sportif	McEwans Lager
1998–1999	Le Coq Sportif	White Rose
2000–2004	Avec	Sainsbury's
2005	ISC	Sainsbury's
2006	Errea	Atlantic Solutions
2007	Errea	Eric France
2008–2009	Kooga	Eric France
2010	Prostar	Eric France
2011	Macron	Eric France
2012–2013	Fi-Ta	Eric France
2014	Macron	C&D Cleaning Services
2015	Macron	Plumbcare
2016	Macron	Backstage Academy
2017	ISC	Backstage Academy
2018	ISC	One World Travel Group
2019–2020	ISC	ASUS
2021–2022	Hummel	ASUS
2023	Ellgren	ASUS
2024	Ellgren	DIY Kitchens
2025	Ellgren	DIY Kitchens
2026	Ellgren	DIY Kitchens

== Rivalries ==
Wakefield Trinity's main rivals are Castleford who they play in the Calder Derby. The stadiums are only 8 miles apart. Each year Wakefield and Castleford compete for the Adam Watene trophy, named after Watene who played for both teams, and died in 2008, aged 31. They also have another local rivalry with Featherstone Rovers although this is considered a lesser rival in recent years as they play in different leagues. Both Wakefield and Castleford have been more successful than Featherstone Rovers in recent years.

There is an historic rivalry with Leeds as both were successful in the 60s and 70s and competed in some major games, the most famous being the 1968 Challenge Cup final where Leeds won in controversial fashion. Wakefield has other West Yorkshire rivalries with Huddersfield and Bradford.

== Stadium ==
=== Belle Vue ===
The site was purchased in 1895 after the split between rugby league and rugby union, to provide a permanent base for Wakefield Trinity who had been playing on fields in the area since 1873. Money was provided by the Wakefield Athletic Club, and the ground was also used for cycling and athletics competitions.

Floodlights were installed in 1967 and were upgraded in 1990/91.

On Saturday 16 September 2006, the stadium played host to 'The Battle of Belle Vue' when 11,000 fans from Trinity and Castleford watched the match which would decide who was relegated from Super League. Wakefield won the match 29–17 sending their nearest rivals Castleford down to the National League.

The capacity of the stadium was increased to 12,600 in 2008, to help with the application for a 2009 Super League licence, which was granted in July 2008.

In June 2015, it was announced Wakefield Trinity would leave Belle Vue at the end of the season as they could not afford to stay. Before the end of the season it was announced Belle Vue was up for sale and was sold in 2016. Although the new owners expressed interest in redeveloping the stadium, no progress was made. There were worries that the leaseholder of the car park would at some point bar access to the ground.

At this point, the freehold to the ground was purchased with the help of a loan from the local council. Theoretical plans to build a stadium elsewhere again stalled around the time of Covid; the club focused on the overdue redevelopment of Belle Vue at this point, leading to the Neil Fox MBE stand being opened in 2024.

In November 2020, the club submitted plans for a major redevelopment of Belle Vue. The proposals included the construction of a new 2,500-seat East Stand, refurbishment of the North Stand terracing, upgraded floodlights, improved community and hospitality facilities, a fan zone and the refurbishment of the existing Rollin Shack building to provide café and retail facilities.

The centrepiece of the redevelopment was the new East Stand, which opened in 2024 and was named the Neil Fox MBE Stand in honour of club legend Neil Fox. The stand provided approximately 2,500 seats alongside new hospitality, conferencing, community and spectator facilities and represented the most significant redevelopment of Belle Vue for several decades.

Following Matt Ellis' takeover of Wakefield Trinity in 2023, further investment was made across the stadium, commercially known as the DIY Kitchens Stadium. During 2024 and 2025 the North Stand terracing and corners were upgraded, a new South Terrace was created and the South Stand underwent extensive refurbishment. The upper levels of the South Stand were redeveloped to provide improved hospitality boxes, bars and lounges, while the main hospitality restaurant was refurbished as the LED Studio Directors' Lounge. New food and drink outlets, fan zones, digital perimeter advertising boards, a second large video screen, improved toilet facilities, new spectator barriers, upgraded surfacing and extensive painting and signage improvements were also introduced.

As a result of the stadium improvements, the certified capacity of Belle Vue increased from 8,027 to 9,252 in June 2025. The expanded North Stand, including its corners, was certified to accommodate 3,282 spectators, while the newly created South Terrace added a further 438 places. The club also received approval for further development of the West Stand.

Further redevelopment was completed ahead of the 2026 season with the opening of The Clubhouse, following approximately 12 months of development. The new facility operates as a café, bar and food venue, opening to the public at selected times as well as providing a pre-match and post-match venue for supporters. A dedicated Club Store at the DIY Kitchens Stadium also provides the club with permanent retail facilities for merchandise and ticket sales.

The redevelopment transformed Belle Vue from an ageing ground whose future had repeatedly been uncertain into a substantially modernised stadium while allowing Wakefield Trinity to remain at their traditional home. Investment continued alongside the club's return to Super League, with improvements designed to increase capacity, hospitality and commercial revenue and improve the matchday experience for supporters.

== 2027 squad ==
2027 Wakefield Trinity Squad
First team squad			Coaching staff
(England) Charlie Abraham – LF; (New Zealand) Caius Faatili – PR; (Turkey) Emre Güler – PR; (England) Corey Hall – CE, SR; (New Zealand) Caleb Hamlin-Uele – PR; (England) Tom Johnstone – WG; (England) Myles Lawford – SH, SO; (England) Ellis Lingard – PR, SR, LF; (England) Davy Litten – CE, FB; (Poland) Zac Lipowīcz – SR	(New Zealand) Tray Lolesio – PR; (England) Ned McCormack – CE; (England) Kian McGann – FB, SO, SH; (England) Mike McMeeken (c) – PR, SR; (England) Jayden Myers – WG, FB; (England) Oliver Pratt – WG, CE; (Australia) Ky Rodwell – PR, LF; (England) Josh Rourke – FB (gk); (England) Jack Sinfield – SH, SO (gk)	(England) Cameron Smith – LF, SR; (England) Harvey Smith – HK; (England) Matty Storton – SR, PR; (Cook Islands) Mason Teague – HK, LF; (Samoa) Jazz Tevaga – LF, HK, PR; (England) Jake Trueman – SO, SH, FB; (Samoa) Roger Tuivasa-Sheck – FB, WG; (New Zealand) Isaiah Vagana – SR, PR	Head coach: (England) Daryl Powell; Assistant coaches: (England) Michael Shenton; (England) Danny Kirmond; Legend: (c) Captain(s); (vc) Vice-captain(s); (red card) = suspended; = injured; (gk) = Goal kicker; Updated: Source(s): https://wakefieldtrinity.com/squads/first-team/

== 2027 transfers ==
=== Gains ===
Player	From	Contract	Date
(England) Cameron Smith	Leeds Rhinos	4 years	28 January 2026
(England) Ned McCormack	Leeds Rhinos	3 years	8 September 2026
(Samoa) Roger Tuivasa-Sheck	New Zealand Warriors	2 years	27 March 2026
(Cook Islands) Mason Teague	Burleigh Bears	2 years	27 July 2026
(England) Davy Litten	Hull FC	4 years	10 August 2026

=== Losses ===
Player	From	Contract	Date
(England) Cameron Scott	Bradford Bulls	2 years	17 June 2026
(Scotland) Lachlan Walmsley	Bradford Bulls	2 years	6 October 2026
(Australia) Tyson Smoothy	Perth Bears	3 years	27 July 2026
(England) Max Jowitt	York Knights	2 years	4 September 2026
(Samoa) Mason Lino	Castleford Tigers	2 years	8 September 2026
(England) Will Tate	Huddersfield Giants	2 years	21 September 2026
(England) Olly Russell	Oldham RLFC	Loan until end of 2027 season	6 October 2026
(England) Noah High	Oldham RLFC	1 year	26 October 2026
(England) Jordan Williams	Leigh Leopards		8 November 2026
(England) Neil Tchamambe	London Broncos	2 years	15 November 2026

=== Retired ===
Player	Date
(England) Jay Pitts	6 September 2026

== Players ==
=== Harry Sunderland Trophy winners ===
The Harry Sunderland Trophy is awarded to the Man-of-the-Match in the Super League Grand Final by the Rugby League Writers' Association.

Season	Recipient
1966–67	Ray Owen
1967 –68	Gary Cooper

=== Golden Greats (1945–91) ===
The "Golden Greats" side was named on 21 March 1992.

1. Gerry Round
2. Fred Smith
3. Alan Skene
4. Neil Fox
5. Gert Coetzer
6. Harold Poynton
7. Keith Holliday
8. Jack Wilkinson
9. Len Marson
10. Don Vines
11. Mick Exley
12. Bob Haigh
13. Derek Turner

== Coaches ==
Name	Contract Started	Contract Ended
Jim Croston	1946 +/-	1946 +/-
(England) Harry Beverley	c. 1951	c. 1951
John Malpass	c. 1950s	c. 1950s
Ken Traill	1958	1970
(England) Neil Fox	May 1970	March 1974
(England) Peter Fox	June 1974	May 1976
Geoff Gunney MBE	June 1976	November 1976
Brian Lockwood	November 1976	January 1978
Ian Brooke	January 1978	January 1979
William Kirkbride	January 1979	April 1980
Bill Ashurst	June 1981	April 1982
Ray Batten	May 1982	July 1983
Derek Turner	July 1983	February 1984
Geoffrey Wraith	February 1984	May 1984
David Lamming	October 1984	April 1985
Len Casey	April 1985	June 1986
Tony Dean	June 1986	December 1986
Trevor Bailey	December 1986	April 1987
David Topliss	May 1987	April 1994
David Hobbs	May 1994	January 1995
Paul Harkin	January 1995	January 1996
(Australia) Mitch Brennan	January 1996	June 1997
(England) Andy Kelly	June 1997	May 2000
(New Zealand) Tony Kemp	May 2000	October 2000
(Australia) John Harbin	October 2000	October 2001
(England) Peter Roe	November 2001	July 2002
(Australia) Shane McNally & (Australia) Adrian Vowles	August 2002	August 2003
(Australia) Shane McNally	September 2003	June 2005
(Australia) Tony Smith	June 2005	July 2006
(England) John Kear	July 2006	September 2011
(England) Richard Agar	September 2011	June 2014
(Australia) James Webster	June 2014	May 2015
(Australia) Brian Smith	June 2015	March 2016
(England) Chris Chester	March 2016	August 2021
(New Zealand) Willie Poching	August 2021	September 2022
(England) Mark Applegarth	September 2022	October 2023
(England) Daryl Powell	October 2023	

== Seasons ==
=== League history ===
- 1895–1902: Division 1
- 1902–1904: Division 2
- 1904–1982: Division 1
- 1982–1983: Division 2
- 1983–1986: Division 1
- 1986–1987: Division 2
- 1987–1995: Division 1
- 1995–1998: Division 2
- 1999–2023: Super League
- 2024: Championship
- 2025–present: Super League

=== Super League era ===
Season	League									Play-offs	Challenge Cup	Other competitions		Name	Tries	Name	Points
Season	Division	P	W	D	L	F	A	Pts (Note: Win percentage for 2020 and 2021)	Pos	Play-offs	Challenge Cup	Other competitions		Top try scorer		Top point scorer	
1996	Division One	20	10	1	9	485	455	21	6th		QF						
1997	Division One	20	9	1	10	393	419	19	5th		R5						
1998	Division One	30	22	1	7	790	506	45	1st		R4						
1999	Super League	30	10	0	20	608	795	20	11th		R5						
2000	Super League	28	8	0	20	557	771	16	10th		R5						
2001	Super League	28	8	0	20	529	817	14	11th		QF						
2002	Super League	28	5	2	21	566	899	12	11th		QF						
2003	Super League	28	7	1	20	505	774	15	11th		R5						
2004	Super League	28	15	0	13	788	662	30	6th	Lost in Semi Final	QF						
2005	Super League	28	10	0	18	716	997	20	10th		R4						
2006	Super League	28	10	0	18	591	717	20	10th		R4						
2007	Super League	27	11	1	15	596	714	23	8th		R5						
2008	Super League	27	11	0	16	574	760	22	8th		SF						
2009	Super League	27	16	0	11	685	609	32	5th	Lost in Elimination Playoffs	R5						
2010	Super League	27	9	0	18	539	741	18	11th		R4						
2011	Super League	27	7	0	20	453	957	10	13th		R4						
2012	Super League	27	13	0	14	633	764	26	8th	Lost in Elimination Playoffs	R4						
2013	Super League	7	10	1	16	660	749	21	11th		R5						
2014	Super League	27	10	1	16	557	750	21	12th		R4						
2015	Super League	23	3	0	20	402	929	6	12th	Won in Million Pound Game	R6						
2015	The Qualifiers	7	3	0	4	153	170	6	4th	Won in Million Pound Game	R6						
2016	Super League	30	10	0	20	571	902	20	8th		SF						
2017	Super League	30	16	0	14	714	679	32	5th		QF						
2018	Super League	30	13	1	16	747	696	27	5th		R6						
2019	Super League	29	11	0	18	608	723	22	9th		QF						
2020	Super League	19	5	0	13	324	503	64.4	10th		R6						
2021	Super League	24	9	0	15	482	548	37.50	10th		R6 (Note: Officially round 3 due to the competitions temporary restructure in 2021.)						
2022	Super League	27	10	0	17	497	648	20	10th		QF						
2023	Super League	27	4	0	23	303	742	8	12th		R6						
2024	Championship	26	25	0	1	1010	262	50	1st	Won in Grand Final	R5	1895 Cup	W				
2025	Super League	27	15	0	12	688	458	30	6th	Lost in Elimination Playoffs	QF						
2026	Super League	27	19	0	8	709	486	38	4th	Won in Grand Final	QF						

== Honours ==
=== League ===
- Division 1 / Super League:

Winners (3): 1966–67, 1967–68, 2026
Runners up (2): 1959–60, 1961–62
Super League – Academy
Winners (1): 2009
League Leaders Winners (1): 2009

- Division 2 / Championship:

Winners (3): 1903–04, 1998, 2024
Runners up (1): 1982–83

RFL Championship Leaders' Shield

Winners (1): 2024

- RFL Yorkshire League:

Winners (7): 1909–10, 1910–11, 1945–46, 1958–59, 1959–60, 1961–62, 1965–66

=== Cups ===
- Challenge Cup:

Winners (5): 1908–09, 1945–46, 1959–60, 1961–62, 1962–63
Runners up (3): 1913–14, 1967–68, 1978–79

- RFL 1895 Cup:

Winners (1): 2024

- RFL Yorkshire Cup:

Winners (10):1910–11, 1924–25, 1946–47, 1947–48, 1951–52, 1956–57, 1960–61, 1961–62, 1964–65, 1992–93
Runners up (10): 1926–27, 1932–33, 1934–35, 1936–37, 1939–40, 1945–46, 1958–59, 1973–74, 1974–75, 1990–91

- Pre-schism Yorkshire Cup:

Winners (4): 1879, 1880, 1883, 1887

== Records ==
=== Club records ===
- Biggest win:

110-0 v. Newcastle Thunder (at Post Office Road, 2024, RFL 1895 Cup)

- Highest all-time attendance:

28,254 v. Wigan (at Belle Vue, 1962)

- Highest Super League attendance:

11,000 v. Castleford (at Belle Vue, 2006)

=== Player records ===
- Most tries in a match: 7 by Fred Smith vs Keighley, 1959 & Keith Slater vs Hunslet, 1971
- Most goals in a match: 13 by Mark Conway vs Highfield RLFC, 1992–93 & Mason Lino vs Newcastle Thunder, 2024
- Most points in a match: 38 by Mason Lino vs Newcastle Thunder, 2024
- Most tries in a season: 38 by Fred Smith 1961–62, David Smith 1973–74
- Most goals in a season: 198 by Max Jowitt, 2024
- Most points in a season: 500 by Max Jowitt, 2024. (26 tries and 198 goals)

== See also ==
- List of Wakefield Trinity players
- Wakefield Trinity Ladies
