= Fox (surname) =

Fox is a surname originating in England and Ireland. Variants include Foxe and Foxx.

== English origin ==
The Fox surname in England comes from the Middle English identical word for 'fox', and was given to those who looked like or had the qualities of the animal such as being cunning or having red hair. It can also be a corruption of the Norman name 'Folko' or 'Foulques', and given to those who were the son or descendant of someone with that name. Some Fox carriers in England could also be of Irish ancestry.

== Irish origins ==
The main origin of the Fox surname in Ireland is Ó Sionnaigh, a respectable clan from the Irish Midlands who were rulers of Tethbae and later barons of Kilcoursey in County Offaly. They descend from Niall of the Nine Hostages son, Maine of Tethba of the Southern Uí Néill.

Other possible Fox surname origins in Ireland include de Bhosc, a Norman name from County Limerick, Mac an tSionnaigh a scattered name primarily found in Ulster and Mac Seancha originally from County Sligo, but now chiefly found in County Leitrim, it was incorrectly translated to Fox due to Seancha being falsely thought to derive from Sionnach.

== Some families with this name ==
- Fox sisters (19th century), American sisters credited as the creators of Spiritualism
- Robin Fox family of English actors, including Edward, James, Emilia, Laurence and Lydia Fox
- Fox-Strangways (originally Fox), family name of the Earls of Ilchester
- Lane Fox, a double-barrelled English surname

== Notable persons with this surname ==
=== Actors ===
- Anne-Marie Fox (born 1962), American model and actress
- Bernard Fox (actor) (1927–2016), Welsh actor
- Colin Fox (actor) (1938–2025), Canadian actor
- David Fox (actor) (1941–2021), Canadian actor
- Dorothi Fox (born 1930), American actress
- Edward Fox (actor) (born 1937), English actor
- Emilia Fox (born 1974), English actress, daughter of Edward
- Freddie Fox (actor) (born 1989), English actor
- Harry Fox (1882–1959), American actor
- Jack Fox (actor) (born 1985), English actor
- James Fox (born 1939), English actor
- Janet Fox (1912–2002), American actor
- Jorja Fox (born 1968), American actress
- Julia Fox (born 1990), American actress, model, media personality
- Kerry Fox (born 1966), New Zealand actress
- Laurence Fox (born 1978), English actor, son of James
- Matthew Fox (actor) (born 1966), American actor
- Megan Fox (born 1986), American actress
- Sir Michael Fox (1921–2007), English judge
- Michael J. Fox (born 1961), Canadian-American actor, author, and activist
- Morgan Fox (model) (born 1970), Canadian model and actress
- Paul Fox (actor) (born 1979), British actor
- Philip Fox (actor) English film and television actor
- Robin Fox, father of actors Edward Fox and James Fox; see Robin Fox family
- Sandy Fox (born 1963), American voice actress
- Steve Fox (actor) (1966–1997), American actor and model
- Shayna Fox (born 1984), American voice actress
- Sidney Fox (1907–1942), American actress
- Spencer Fox (born 1993), voice actor
- Templeton Fox (1913–1993), American actress
- Vivica A. Fox (born 1964), American actress
- Zack Fox (born 1990), American actor, stand-up comedian, rapper, writer

=== Arts ===
- Aaron Fox (musicologist) (contemporary), American musicologist
- Adam Fox (poet) (1883–1977), British poet
- Anna Maria Fox (1816–1897), English cultural promoter in Falmouth, Cornwall
- Annie Fox (author) (born 1950), American author
- Christopher Fox (composer) (born 1955), British composer
- Sir David Scott Fox (1910–1985), British diplomat and writer
- David Fox, pseudonym of Isabel Ostrander
- E. Phillips Fox (1865–1915), Australian painter
- Edward Fox (author) (born 1958), American author
- Ethel Carrick Fox (1872–1952), English-born painter better known as Ethel Carrick
- Everett Fox (contemporary), American scholar and translator of the Hebrew Bible
- Sir Frank Fox (author) (1874–1960), Australian journalist and author
- Frederick A. Fox (1931–2011), American composer
- Gardner Fox (1911–1986), American writer
- George Fox (singer) (born 1960), Canadian country music singer
- Gill Fox (1915–2004), American cartoonist and animator
- Greg Fox (author) (born 1961), American author and cartoonist
- Hugo Fox (1897–1969), American bassoonist
- James Fox (singer) (born 1976), Welsh musician and songwriter
- Jane Fox (1899–1991), American dance professor
- John Foxe (1517–1587), English author
- Josh Fox (contemporary) American director of documentaries
- Judy Fox (born 1957), American sculptor
- Justin Fox (born 1964), American financial journalist, commentator, and writer
- Levi Fox (1914–2006), director of the Shakespeare Birthplace Trust, England
- Lucas Fox (born 1953), British heavy metal musician
- Margalit Fox (born 1961), American author
- Mary Fox (artist) (1922–2005), British artist
- Mem Fox (born 1946), Australian writer of children's books
- Neil Fox (broadcaster) (born 1961), English radio and television presenter
- Oz Fox (born 1961), Christian metal musician
- Paul Fox (musician) (1951–2007), British singer and guitarist
- Paul Fox (music producer) (1954–2022), American record producer
- Peter Fox (artist) (born 1962), American painter
- Peter Fox (musician) (born 1971), singer Pierre Baigorry of the German band Seeed
- Peter Fox-Penner (born 1955), American author
- Rik Fox (born 1955), Polish-American musician
- Rosalind Fox Solomon (1930-2025), American photographer
- Sally Fox (photographer) (1929–2006), American photographer and editor
- Samantha Fox (born 1966), British glamour model and singer
- Steve Fox (musician), Canadian country-music singer/songwriter
- Toby Fox (born 1991), musician and video game designer
- Virgil Fox (1912–1980), American organist

=== Military ===
- Cecil H. Fox (1873–1963), British naval officer
- Charley Fox (1920–2008), Royal Canadian Air Force officer in World War II
- David G. Fox, U.S. Army officer
- Earl R. Fox (1919–2012), U.S. Navy and Coast Guard veteran
- Francis John Fox (1857–1902), New Zealand soldier and farmer
- Francis Lane Fox (1899–1989), British Army officer and Yorkshire landowner
- George Malcolm Fox (1843–1918), Inspector General of Gymnasia for the British Army at Aldershot
- Gustavus Fox (1821–1883), American naval officer in the Civil War
- Josiah Fox (1763–1847), Cornish-American naval architect
- Myles C. Fox (1918–1942), United States Marine Corps officer and Navy Cross recipient
- Paddy Fox (1933–2016), British recruiting sergeant and Chelsea Pensioner
- Wesley L. Fox (1931–2017), American US Marine, awarded the Medal of Honor

=== Politics and peerage ===
- Arthur Aloysius Fox (1847–1901), South Australian politician
- Ashley Fox (born 1969), English Conservative MEP, elected 2009
- Black Fox (Cherokee chief) (c. 1746–1811), Cherokee chief
- Bradley R. Fox, Bahamian politician
- Charles James Fox (1749–1806), British politician
- Charles Richard Fox (1796–1873), illegitimate son of Henry Richard Vassall-Fox, 3rd Baron Holland
- Chauncey J. Fox (1797–1883), New York politician
- Chloë Fox (born 1971), Australian politician
- Claire Fox (born 1960), British political writer
- Colin Fox (politician) (born 1959), Scottish politician
- Daniel M. Fox (1819–1890), American politician
- David Spencer Fox (1817–1901), American politician
- Francis Fox (1939–2024), member of the Senate of Canada
- Galen Fox (born 1943), Hawaii politician and convicted sex offender
- Gary Fox (politician) (1943–2022), Canadian politician from Ontario
- Henry Fox, 1st Baron Holland (1705–1774), English nobleman and statesman
- Henry Richard Vassall-Fox, 3rd Baron Holland (1773–1840), English nobleman and politician
- Jamie Fox (American government official) (1954–2017), American government official and political strategist
- Jamie Fox (Canadian politician) (born 1964), Canadian politician
- Jarod Fox, American politician
- Jon Fox (1947–2018), American politician from Pennsylvania
- Liam Fox (born 1961), British politician from Woodspring
- Marcus Fox (1927–2002), British politician from Shipley
- Milton C. Fox, Canadian politician from Essex
- Peter Fox (Canadian politician) (1921–1989), Canadian politician
- Phil Fox (politician), American politician from Missouri
- Sally Fox (politician) (1951–2014), American politician from Vermont
- Stanley Fox (1906–1984), Canadian politician from Manitoba
- Stanley H. Fox (1929–2019), American politician from North Carolina
- Stephen Fox (1627–1716), English politician from Wiltshire
- Vicente Fox (born 1942), President of Mexico
- William Fox (politician) (1812–1893), Premier of New Zealand

=== Religion ===
- Edward Fox (bishop) (1496–1538), English churchman, Bishop of Hereford
- Emmet Fox (1886–1951), Irish spiritual leader of the early 20th century
- Francis Fox (divine) (1675–1738), English divine
- George Fox (1624–1691), English Dissenter and the founder of the Religious Society of Friends
- Joseph John Fox (1855–1915), American Roman Catholic bishop
- Matthew Fox (priest) (born 1940), American priest and theologian
- Peter Fox (bishop) (born 1952), British Anglican vicar and former bishop
- Richard Foxe (Prince Bishop, 1448–1528), English churchman, founder of Corpus Christi College, Oxford
- Tom Fox (Quaker) (1951–2006), Quaker peacemaker executed by insurgents in Iraq
- William Johnson Fox (1786–1864), English religious and political orator

=== Science, technology, engineering, mathematics ===
- Annette Baker Fox (1912–2011), American international relations scholar
- Arthur J. Fox Jr. (1923–2016), American civil engineer and magazine editor
- Brian Fox (computer programmer) (born 1959), software programmer
- Sir Charles Fox (civil and railway engineer) (1810–1874), English civil engineer
- Sir Charles Douglas Fox (1840–1921), British civil engineer
- Charles Fox (mathematician) (1897–1977), introduced Fox–Wright function and Fox H-function
- Cyril Fred Fox (1882–1967), English archaeologist
- Dixon Ryan Fox (1887–1945), American educator and researcher
- Fiona Fox (UK press officer) (born 1964), director of the UK Science Media Centre
- Sir Francis Fox (civil engineer) (1844–1927), English civil engineer
- J. G. Fox (1916–1980), known as Jack, American nuclear physicist
- James Fox (engineer) (1780–1830), English machine tool maker
- John Fox (statistician) (born 1946), British statistician
- Kate Fox, British social anthropologist
- Mark S. Fox (born ca. 1952), Canadian computer scientist
- Marye Anne Fox (1947–2021), American chemist and university administrator
- Ralph Fox (1913–1973), American mathematician
- Robert Fortescue Fox (1858–1940), British physician
- Robin Fox (anthropologist) (1934–2024), anthropologist
- Samson Fox (1838–1903), British engineer, industrialist and philanthropist
- Sidney W. Fox (1912–1998), American biochemist
- Theodore Fortescue Fox (1899–1989), British physician and medical journal editor
- Wade Fox (1920–1964), American zoologist and herpetologist
- Wilfrid Fox (1875–1962), British dermatologist and horticulturist
- William Darwin Fox (1805–1880), English clergyman, naturalist, and cousin of Charles Darwin

=== Sports ===
- Adam Fox (born 1998), player with New York Rangers
- Alicia Fox (born 1986), American professional wrestler and model
- Allen Fox (born 1939), American tennis player, coach, and author
- Andy Fox (born 1971), American baseball coach
- Arthur Fox Jr. (1924–1953), Australian rules footballer
- Bertil Fox (born 1951), British bodybuilder
- Billy Fox (boxer) (1926–1986), American boxer
- Chad Fox (born 1970), American baseball player
- Christian Fox (born 1981), Scottish footballer
- Danny Fox (born 1986), Scottish footballer
- David Fox (footballer) (born 1983), English footballer
- David Fox (swimmer) (born 1971), member of the USA 1996 Olympic team
- De'Aaron Fox (born 1997), American basketball player
- Denton Fox (1948–2013), American football player
- Deryck Fox (born 1964), British rugby league footballer and coach
- Don Fox (1935–2008), English rugby league footballer
- Francis Hugh Fox (1863–1952), English rugby player
- Frank Fox (Gaelic footballer) (1911–1940), Irish Gaelic footballer
- Frank Fox (racing driver) (1877–1931), American auto racing driver
- Frank Fox (rugby league) (fl. 1960s and 1970s), rugby league footballer
- Frederick Fox (cricketer) (1863–1935), English cricketer
- Geoff Fox (footballer, born 1925) (1925–1994), English footballer
- Hannah Fox (born 1969), American boxer
- Hayden Foxe (born 1977), Australian football player
- Jack Fox (American football) (born 1996), American football player
- Jack Fox (baseball) (1885–1963), American professional baseball player
- Taylor Fox (born 2000), American ice hockey player
- Tiger Jack Fox (1907–1954), American light heavyweight boxer
- Jessica Fox (canoeist) (born 1994), French-born Australian world and Olympic champion slalom canoist
- John Fox (American football) (born 1955), American football coach
- Joshua Fox (born 1994), Fijian basketball player
- Keyaron Fox (born 1982), American football player
- Louis Fox (died c. 1866), American billiardist
- Lucius Fox (baseball) (born 1997), Bahamian baseball player
- Mike Fox (baseball coach) (born c. 1956), American college baseball coach
- Myriam Fox-Jerusalmi (born 1961), French world champion slalom canoer
- Nathan Fox (footballer) (born 1992), English footballer
- Nathan Fox (triple jumper) (born 1990), English triple jumper
- Neil Fox (cricketer) (born 1962), former English cricketer
- Neil Fox (rugby league) (born 1939), English rugby league footballer
- Nellie Fox (1927–1975), American baseball player
- Pat Fox (born 1962), Tipperary Hurling
- Peter Fox (rugby league, born 1933), English player and coach
- Oscar Fox, Sr. (1889–1947), English footballer
- Oscar Fox, Jr. (1921–1990), English footballer; son of the above
- Peter Fox (footballer) (born 1957), English former footballer
- Peter Fox (rugby league, born 1933) (1933–2019), English rugby league footballer and coach
- Peter Fox (rugby league, born 1984), English rugby league footballer
- Peter Fox (sailor) (born 1967), New Zealand sailor
- Recee Fox (born 1996), American former basketball player
- Richard Fox (canoeist) (born 1960), British kayaking champion
- Rick Fox (born 1969), Canadian basketball player and actor
- Ruel Fox (born 1968), English football player
- Stan Fox (1952–2000), American racing driver
- Tiger Jack Fox (1907–1954), American boxer
- Tim Fox (American football) (born 1953), American football player
- Tom Fox (rugby league), rugby league footballer of the 1930s
- Tomon Fox (born 1998), American football player
- Uffa Fox (1898–1972), English boat designer and sailing enthusiast
- Wilbur Fox (1919–1991), American professional basketball player

=== Other ===
- Anthony Fox, Irish writer, producer, director, actor and founder of the New Theatre, Dublin
- Bernard Fox (Irish republican) (born 1951), hunger striker
- Charles Masson Fox (1866–1935), Cornish businessman
- David Fox, various people with this name
- David Fox (game designer), multimedia producer
- Ed Fox, several persons
- Edward Fox, several persons
- Francis Fox, several persons
- Frank Fox, several persons
- Frank S. Fox (1861–1920), American academic and college president
- Frank Fox, for whom Fox, Oklahoma was named
- Freddie Fox, multiple people
- Frederick Fox, multiple people
- Frederic Fox (1917–1981), Keeper of Princetoniana at Princeton University
- Frederick Fox (milliner) (1931–2013), Australian-born English milliner
- Jack Fox, multiple people
- Jennifer Fox, multiple people
- Josephine Clardy Fox (1881–1970), American businesswoman and philanthropist
- Kathleen Fox (aviator) (born 1951), Canadian parachutist, pilot, flight instructor
- Lindsay Fox (born 1937), Australian transport businessman
- Martin Fox (businessman), gambling operator and owner of the Tropicana Club in Havana, Cuba
- Martin S. Fox (1924–2020), American publisher
- Muriel Fox (born 1928), American public relations executive and feminist activist
- Neil Fox (various)
- Nikki Fox (born 1980), BBC disability news correspondent
- Paul Fox, various people with this name
- Paul S. Fox (1898–1972), American set decorator
- Sir Paul Fox (television executive) (1925–2024), British television executive
- Peter Fox, various people with this name
- Peter Fox (character), fictional character in the comic strip FoxTrot by Bill Amend
- Peter Fox (journalist) (1830–1869), radical journalist active in England
- Peter Fox (librarian) (born 1949), British academic librarian
- Peter Fox (professor) (1959–2021), American professor at Rensselaer Polytechnic Institute
- Peter T. Fox, neuroimaging researcher and neurologist
- Richard Edwin Fox (1956–2003), American criminal
- Richard J. Fox, American property developer
- Robert Fox, various people with this name
- Rodney Fox, Australian scuba diver and filmmaker
- Sonny Fox (1925–2021), American television host
- Sonny Fox (XM Radio) (1947–2020), American DJ
- Stuart Fox (born 1978), English poker player
- Sylvan Fox, American journalist
- Terry Fox (1958–1981), Canadian cancer treatment activist
- William Fox (producer) (1879–1952), founder of Fox Film Corporation

== Fictional characters ==
- Aaron Fox (Nexo Knights), a character in Nexo Knights
- Beth Fox, a character in the American sitcom television series Coach
- Steve Fox, a character in the Tekken video game series
