= Peter Fox =

Peter Fox may refer to:

== Arts and entertainment ==
- Peter Fox (actor), American actor
- Peter Fox (artist) (born 1962), American painter
- Peter Fox (musician) (born 1971), German musician
- Peter Fox (character), a fictional character in the comic strip FoxTrot by Bill Amend

== Sports ==
- Peter Fox (rugby league, born 1933) (1933–2019), English rugby league footballer and coach
- Peter Fox (footballer) (born 1957), English footballer
- Peter Fox (sailor) (born 1967), New Zealand sailor
- Peter Fox (rugby league, born 1984), English rugby league footballer

== Others ==
- Peter Fox (journalist) (1830–1869), radical journalist active in England
- Peter Fox (Canadian politician) (1921–1989), Canadian politician
- Peter Fox (librarian) (born 1949), British academic librarian
- Peter Fox (bishop) (born 1952), British Anglican vicar and former bishop
- Peter Fox (professor) (1959–2021), Australian-born data scientist who worked at Rensselaer Polytechnic Institute
- Peter Fox (Welsh politician) (born 1961), Welsh politician
- Peter T. Fox, American neuroimaging researcher and neurologist

== See also ==
- Pete Fox (1909–1966), American Major League Baseball player
- Peter Fox-Penner (born 1955), American author
