= Freddy Fox =

Freddy Fox may refer to:

- Freddy Fox, a character from Rupert Bear
- Freddy Fox, a character in the 1983 pilot, The Further Adventures of Noddy
- Freddy Fox, a character from Peppa Pig

== See also ==
- Freddie Fox
- Frederick Fox (disambiguation)
- Fred Fox (disambiguation)
