= Frank Fox =

Frank Fox may refer to:

== Sportspeople ==
- Frank Fox (racing driver) (1877–1931), American auto racing driver
- Frank Fox (Gaelic footballer) (1911–1940), Irish Gaelic footballer
- Frank Fox (rugby league) (fl. 1960s and 1970s) rugby league footballer
- Frank Fox (motorcyclist) in 1957 Grand Prix motorcycle racing season
- Frank Fox (American football) in 1965 American Football League draft

== Others ==
- Sir Frank Fox (author) (1874–1960), Australian journalist and author
- Frank S. Fox (1861–1920), American academic and college president
- Frank Fox (actor) in the 1938 film Second Thoughts
- Frank Fox (composer) for films including The Master Detective
- Frank Fox (writer), see Screen Directors Playhouse
- Frank Fox, for whom Fox, Oklahoma was named

== See also ==
- Francis Fox (disambiguation)
- Mary Frank Fox, sociologist
