= Frances Fox =

Frances Fox may refer to:

- Frances Margaret Fox (1870–1959), American children's writer
- Frances Fox Piven (born 1932), American sociologist
- Frances Fox, founder of the environmentalist activism organization Climate Live

== See also ==
- Dale Evans (born Frances Octavia Smith, 1912–2001), American actress and singer who sometimes performed under her first married name, Frances Fox
- Francis Fox (disambiguation)
