= Mary Fox =

Mary Fox may refer to

- Mary Fox, Baroness Holland (1746–1778), English noblewomen
- Lady Mary Fox (1798–1864), English writer, an illegitimate daughter of King William IV of the United Kingdom
- Mary Fox (artist) (1922–2005), English artist
- Mary Frank Fox, American academic
- Marye Anne Fox (1947–2021), American chemist and educator

== See also ==
- Marie Fox (1850–1878), also known as Mary, French writer and a princess of Liechtenstein
- Mary Fox-Strangways, Countess of Ilchester 1852–1935, English noblewoman
