= Murtagh King =

Irish scribe and translator

Murtagh King (Irish: Muircheartach Ó Cionga; c. 1562 – c. 1639) was an Irish Old Testament translator and scribe.

== Overview ==
King was a member of an Irish bardic family, who were residents of the barony of Kilcoursey, County Offaly, known as Fox's Country. They were poets, scribes, and drafted legal documents for their patrons, mainly the families of Fox and Mageoghegan. Writing in 2001, McCaughy states "What we can say is that the Muircheartach Ó Cionga that we are concerned with in this study was one of a learned poetic family of the name who are referred to quite frequently in the sources, some of whose poetry survives (a good deal of it religious), and that they are located in the barony of Kilcoursey in Fox’s Country."

Muircheartach first apparent appearances are as Murtagh O Kinge of Kilcolly and Murtho O King of Fox's County in fiants of the 1590s. In the 1610s he was an agent and receiver to Lord Lambert's lands near Athlone, County Westmeath (he appeared as a witness for dowager Lady Lambert in the 1630s). He appears to have been among the native grantees who received land in the plantation of his locality around the year 1620. The Franciscan Paul King was his nephew.

== Association with William Bedell ==
King was employed from 1627 by William Bedell (later Bishop of Kilmore) to teach Irish to himself and students at Trinity College, Dublin. Under Bedell's influence, King conformed to the Church of Ireland and was ordained a priest on 23 September 1633. This provided him with an income while he translated the Old Testament and Apocrypha into Irish, having been selected as an acknowledged master of the language, in both prose and verse. It was eventually published (without Apocrypha) in 1685 by Robert Boyle under the title Leabhuir na Seintiomna ar na ttarruing go Gaidhlig trechiram & dhithracht an Doctuir Uilliam Bedel/The Books of the Old Testament translated into Irish by the care and diligence of Doctor William Bedel. Bedell wrote to James Ussher:

"We haue brought Mr King to read an houre every day to those that are already chosen, to frame them to the right pronunciation and exercise of the language, to which purpose we haue gotten a few coppies of the booke of Common prayer, and do begin with the Catechisme which is therein .... The translation of the Psalmes into prose and verse, whereof I spoke to your Grace, would be a good worke, and Mr King has giuen us an assay in the first psalme ..."

By the end of his life, serious questions had arisen concerning King's fitness to be a Church of Ireland minister. He was accused of secretly attending Catholic mass with his family, inappropriately administering baptism and holy communion. A sum of the matters objected against Murtagh King alleged that:

"He is ignorant of the Bible .... Cannot read distinctly and intelligibly. Causeth his parish clerk, who is a layman, to execute the office of priest. Left his congregation desolate in a church one Sunday, and went to the alehouse. Another Sunday, refused to perform service, saying his occasions led to the mass house. Went to Mass on the Sunday. Baptised a child with words but without the element of water, and then with water but without the words. Baptised another with gloves on. In administering the Holy Communion he did not use the appointed words but said, "Eat this according to our Saviour’s meaning." Committed a battery and bloodshed. Suffers his children to go to mass. When his son asked him for money, he said, "Poor slave; woe’s me, that am going to hell to get you maintenance", insinuating that he was conformable against his conscience."

Bedell defended him, concerned that attacks on King's character would detract from the reputation of the translation, and said as much in a letter to Thomas Wentworth, 1st Earl of Strafford, dated December 1638.

"Mr King is a much more competent man than he is represented to be. He has few matches as an Irish scholar in the kingdom. He has now been imprisoned for four or five months, and that most unjustly, and has been too sick to defend himself. Surely the man who translated God’s Word into Irish deserves better treatment. I pray you do him justice."

King died shortly after, survived by his wife, Margery, and their children. Mrs. King was supported by James Ussher, Bishop Anthony Martin of Meath and Sir James Ware in a land dispute with William Bayly, who in 1638 had seized a benefice of King's.
