= Veterans Endeavor for Treatment and Support Court =

The Veterans Endeavor for Treatment and Support (VETS) Court is a Veterans Treatment Court launched in January 2016 at Fort Hood, Texas. The VETS Court works as a diversion program for veterans with service-connected mental health or substance abuse disorders out of the court system and into enduring treatment solutions with the Department of Veterans Affairs. The program is the first-ever veterans treatment court launched on a military installation, and just the fifth diversion veterans treatment court in the federal system.

== History ==
On January 27, 2017, the VETS Court at Fort Hood graduated its first three participants. The graduation ceremony was attended by U.S. Senator John Cornyn (R-TX) who praised the program, "Just sitting here thinking about these graduates and what you have accomplished with the help, support and love of so many people, this reminds me once again that there in nothing as powerful as a good idea. Unless, of course, it’s the power of a good example. And I think we have both of those at work here today.” Senator Cornyn continued, “I’m going to take what I learned here today back to Washington, so I can make sure that this example can be duplicated in military bases around the country,” Cornyn said, adding that the program represents the best use of tax dollars and judicial resources. The graduation ceremony was also attended by the III Corps and Fort Hood Deputy Commanding General, MG John Uberti. He remarked, “Our three graduates today really exemplify our Army Values...[the graduates] personal courage, their honor, their integrity … really demonstrates the Warrior Ethos.”

== Establishment ==
The VETS Court at Fort Hood is led by Federal Magistrate Judge Jeffrey C. Manske. Its development was led by U.S. Army Captain J. Patrick Robinson, an Army Judge Advocate assigned as a Special Assistant U.S. Attorney in the Western District of Texas under the supervision of the Honorable Richard L. Durbin Jr., United States Attorney for the Western District of Texas. The program was established by Interagency Agreement signed by Judge Manske, Mr. Durbin, the Chief of U.S. Pretrial Services for the Western District of Texas, and a regional leader from the U.S. Department of Veterans Affairs Healthcare System.
