= Ó Sionnaigh =

Ó Sionnaigh or just Sionnach, is the name of a Gaelic-Irish family, associated with County Westmeath and County Offaly. It is typically Anglicised as Fox today.

== Background ==
The name Ó Sionnaigh means "descendant of the Fox" and originates in the 11th century when King of Tethbae, Tadgh Sionnach Fionn (originally Tadgh Ó Catharnaigh), took on "Sionnach" (Fox) as his name, which was initially given to him as a nickname, likely in reference to his personality traits, presumably slyness or cunningness. Sionnach/Ó Sionnaigh gradually replaced Ó Catharnaigh (O'Kearney) as the main designation for the clan due to Tadgh's descendants, relatives and close associates adopting it instead. The Ó Sionnaigh were involved in many Irish conflicts in the Middle Ages, such as the Norman Invasion and Bruce Campaign, alongside numerous common clan feuds. During the Tudor Conquest, the Ó Sionnaigh accepted the English, "Surrender and regrant" policy and exchanged their Gaelic title to become Baron of Kilcoursey and Anglicised their name to Fox. They lost their title and lands due to their participation in the 1641 Irish Rebellion.

== Annalistic references ==
The Irish annals record the following

- Tadgh Sionnach Fionn Ó Catharnaigh
- Muireadhach Sionnach
- Beag an Sionnach Odhar
- Catharnach Sionnach
- Flann Sionnach
- Ruairí Sionnach
- Niall Rua Sionnach
- Muirchearthach Sionnach
- Donnchú Ó Sionnaigh
- Cú Choigcríoche Ó Sionnaigh
- Breasal Ó Sionnaigh
- Brian Ó Sionnaigh
- Félim Ó Sionnaigh
- Hoibeard Ó Sionnaigh (Hubert Fox)
