= Aaron Fox =

Aaron Fox may refer to:

- Aaron Fox (musicologist), American ethnomusicologist, anthropologist, and linguist
- Aaron Fox (ice hockey) (born 1976), American ice hockey executive and player
- Aaron Fox (Nexo Knights), a character in Nexo Knights

== See also ==
- De'Aaron Fox, American basketball player
