= United States Army Installation Management Command Korea Region =

U.S. Army IMCOM-Korea Region
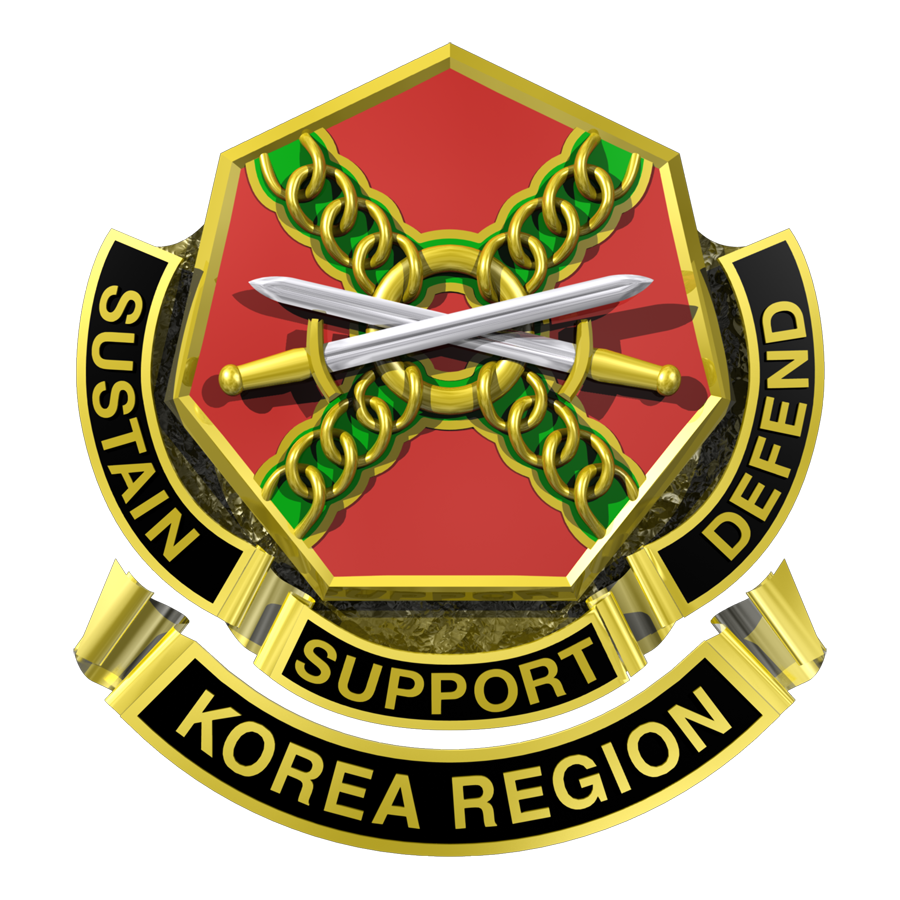
- We are the Army's Home in Korea
- Active: 24 October 2006 – October 2011
- Country: United States of America
- Allegiance: United States
- Branch: United States Army
- Type: IMCOM Regional Office
- Part of: Department of Defense Department of the Army Installation Management Command
- Nickname: IMCOM
- Mottos: Sustain, Support, Defend
- Colors: Red, green, black & gold

The United States Army Installation Management Command Korea Region (IMCOM-K) was a military organization whose primary mission is to provide the United States Army in Korea the installation capabilities and services to support expeditionary operations in a time of persistent conflict, and to provide a quality of life for Soldiers and Families commensurate with their service. IMCOM-Korea was the Korean regional office of the Installation Management Command. IMCOM-K had its headquarters in Seoul, Republic of Korea on United States Army Garrison Yongsan. However, IMCOM Korea was deactivated and absorbed into IMCOM Pacific in 2011.

== History of the Installation Management Command ==
The United States Army Installation Management Command (IMCOM), a single organization with six regional offices worldwide, was activated on 24 October 2006, to reduce bureaucracy, apply a uniform business structure to manage U.S. Army installations, sustain the environment and enhance the well-being of the military community. It consolidated three organizations under a single command as a direct reporting unit:

1. The former Installation Management Agency (IMA)
2. The former Community and Family Support Center, now called Family and Morale, Welfare and Recreation Command (FMWRC), which is a subordinate command of IMCOM.
3. The former Army Environmental Center, now called the Army Environmental Command (AEC), which is a subordinate command of IMCOM.

Before IMCOM, the Army's 184 installations were managed by one of 15 Major Commands. Support services varied – some provided better services, some provided worse. In September 2001, Army Secretary Thomas E. White introduced the Transformation of Installation Management (TIM), formerly known as Centralized Installation Management (CIM), pledging the Army would implement better business practices and realign installation management to create a more efficient and effective corporate management structure for Army installations worldwide. On 1 October 2002, the Army formed IMA as a field operating agency of the Assistant Chief of Staff for Installation Management (ACSIM) as part of an ongoing effort to realign installations.

IMCOM, is currently headquartered in Arlington, VA, but is relocating to Fort Sam Houston at San Antonio, TX. IMCOM oversees all facets of installation management such as construction; barracks and Family housing; family care; food management; environmental programs; well-being; Soldier and Family morale, welfare and recreation programs; logistics; public works; and installation funding.

== Commanding Generals ==
1. Brigadier General David G. Fox
2. Brigadier General John Uberti
3. Major General Al Aycock
4. Brigadier General Tom Landwermeyer
5. Major General John MacDonald

== United States Army Garrisons in Korea ==
- USAG Daegu
- USAG Camp Red Cloud
- USAG Yongsan
- USAG Camp Casey
- USAG Humphreys
