= Clardy =

Clardy is a surname of likely English, Irish, or French origin. It is believed to be a variant of surnames such as Clary or Clardé, possibly derived from the Old French word clarté, meaning "brightness" or "clarity." Alternatively, it may have developed as an Anglicized form of an Irish surname derived from Ó Cléirigh (O’Cleary), meaning "descendant of the cleric" or "scholar."

People with this surname include:

- H. Stacy Clardy (born 1960), American soldier
- Jon Clardy (born 1943), American scientist
- John Daniel Clardy (1828–1918), American politician
- Josephine Clardy Fox (1881–1970), American businesswoman and philanthropist
- Kit Clardy (1892–1961), American politician
- Martin L. Clardy (1844–1914), American politician
- Robert Clardy (born 1984), American football coach
- Travis Clardy (born 1962), American attorney
