= Edward Fox =

Edward Fox may refer to:

== People ==
- Edward Fox (painter) (c. 1788–1875), British impressionist painter
- Edward Fox (actor) (born 1937), English actor
- Edward Fox (author) (born 1958), American author
- Edward Fox (judge) (1815–1881), American judge
- Edward Fox (MP), member of Parliament for Bishop's Castle
- Edward Foxe (c. 1496–1538), English bishop
- Edward Long Fox (psychiatrist) (1761–1835), British psychiatrist
- Edward Long Fox (physician) (1832–1902), English physician
- Edward Lane Fox, private secretary to Prince Harry
- J. Edward Fox (born 1948), US State Dept. official
- Edward Eddie Fox (footballer) (fl. 1886–1891), Australian Rules Footballer
- Edward "Eddie" Fox, American contestant of Survivor: Caramoan

== Characters ==
- Edward "Eddie" Fox, a fictional character from the 1938 film Tarnished Angel

== See also ==
- Ed Fox (disambiguation)
