= David Fox =

David Fox may refer to:

- David Fox (game designer) (born 1950), American multimedia producer
- David Fox (actor) (1941–2021), Canadian actor
- David Fox (footballer) (born 1983), English footballer
- David Fox (swimmer) (born 1971), member of the USA 1996 Olympic team
- David Spencer Fox (1817–1901), American politician
- David G. Fox, U.S. Army officer
- Sir David Scott Fox (1910–1985), British diplomat and writer
- David R. Fox, candidate in the United States House of Representatives elections in Washington, 2010
- David Fox, a pseudonym of Isabel Ostrander
