= Neil Fox =

Neil Fox may refer to:

- Neil Fox (broadcaster) (born 1961), English radio and television presenter
- Neil Fox (rugby league) (born 1939), English rugby league footballer
- Neil Fox (cricketer) (born 1962), former English cricketer
- Neil Fox (referee), Australian soccer referee
