= Jack Fox =

Jack Fox may refer to:

- Jack Fox (actor) (born 1985), English actor
- Jack Fox (American football) (born 1996), American football player
- Jack Fox (baseball) (1885–1963), American professional baseball player
- Tiger Jack Fox (1907–1954), American light heavyweight boxer
- J. G. Fox (1916–1980), known as Jack, American nuclear physicist
- Jack Foxx, a pen name of Bill Pronzini (born 1943), American writer of detective fiction
