= Lane Fox =

Lane Fox or Lane-Fox is a double-barrelled English surname (see also the surnames Lane and Fox). Notable bearers of the surname include:

- George Lane-Fox (MP) (1793–1848), English landowner and Tory MP
- Sackville Lane-Fox (1797–1874), British Conservative Party politician
- George Lane-Fox (1816–1896), English landowner, High Sheriff of Leitrim and High Sheriff of Yorkshire, son of George Lane-Fox (1793–1848)
- Augustus Henry Lane-Fox (1827–1900), who adopted the name Augustus Pitt Rivers, English army officer, ethnologist and archaeologist
- Sackville George Lane-Fox, 12th Baron Conyers (1827–1888), son of Sackville Lane-Fox (1797–1874)
- George Lane-Fox, 1st Baron Bingley (1870–1947), English Conservative politician, grandson of George Lane-Fox (1793–1848)
- Felicity Lane-Fox (1918–1988), British Conservative member of the House of Lords
- Robin Lane Fox (born 1946), English historian and gardening writer
- Martha Lane Fox, Baroness Lane-Fox of Soho (born 1973), English businesswoman, philanthropist, and public servant, daughter of Robin Lane Fox

== See also ==
- George Fox-Lane, 1st Baron Bingley (c. 1697 – 1773), peer and Tory politician.
- James Fox-Lane (1756–1821), known as James Fox until 1773, landed gentleman and politician.
- Pitt-Rivers
- George Henry Lane-Fox Pitt-Rivers (1890–1966), George Pitt-Rivers, anthropologist and World War II intern.
- Rosalind Venetia Lane Fox Pitt-Rivers (1907–1990), known as Rosalind Pitt-Rivers, British biochemist, wife of George Henry Lane-Fox Pitt-Rivers
- Julian Alfred Lane Fox Pitt-Rivers (1919–2001), Julian Pitt-Rivers, social anthropologist professor, son of George Henry Lane-Fox Pitt-Rivers
- Michael Augustus Lane-Fox Pitt-Rivers (1917–1999), Michael Pitt-Rivers, landowner, son of George Henry Lane-Fox Pitt-Rivers
