= Paul Fox =

Paul Fox may refer to:

- Paul Hervey Fox (1894–1956), American playwright, novelist, and screenwriter
- Paul S. Fox (1898–1972), American set decorator
- Sir Paul Fox (television executive) (1925–2024), British television executive
- Paul Fox (musician) (1951–2007), British singer and guitarist
- Paul Fox (record producer) (1954–2022), American record producer
- Paul Fox, British ambassador to Hungary
- Paul Fox (actor) (born 1979), British actor
- Paul Fox (director), Canadian film and television director
- Paul Fox (yoga teacher), British yoga teacher
