= Louis Fox =

American carom billiards player

John Deery (left) and Louis Fox (right) from a group photo

Louis Fox (died c. December 4, 1866) was an American professional billiards player in the mid-19th century who was briefly the U.S. champion. He is well known for an incident which may or may not have actually happened: He is alleged to have died by suicide as the result of losing a match after a fly interfered with play. The story has become a legend that is often reported as fact.

The confirmed facts are that Fox, who was defending his title as American champion, was defeated in a match by John Deery on September 7, 1865, at Washington Hall in Fox's home town, Rochester, New York; Fox went missing in Rochester on or about December 4, 1866; and his body was found in the Genesee River near the Rochester neighborhood of Charlotte on May 10, 1867. Washington Hall, since demolished, stood at the northeast corner of Main and Clinton, about three blocks east of the Genesee.

The classic version of the story is that Fox was on his way to victory when a fly settled on the cue ball. Fox repeatedly waved his cue stick over the ball to try to brush the fly away. On the third attempt, Fox touched the ball, technically a miscue, forfeiting his shot. His opponent Deery rallied to win the match. The stunned Fox left the billiard hall and took his own life by diving into the Genesee River. Variations of the story's ending have him drowning himself immediately after the match; the next day; or some time later.

Contemporary sources reported Deery's victory, but apparently nothing about the fly. Reports of Fox's death disagreed on whether his death was thought to be by accident or suicide. Another element appearing in later versions of the story is an alleged $40,000 prize. The prize was actually $1,000.
