= Frederick Fox =

Frederick Fox may refer to:

- Frederic Fox (1917–1981), Keeper of Princetoniana at Princeton University
- Frederick Fox (cricketer) (1863–1935), English cricketer
- Frederick Fox (designer) (1910–1991), American designer
- Frederick Fox (milliner) (1931–2013), Australian-born English milliner
- Frederick A. Fox (1931–2011), American composer
- Frederick Fox, a member of the Big Five (Scotland Yard)

== See also ==
- Freddie Fox (disambiguation)
- Fred Fox (disambiguation)
