= Steve Fox (actor) =

American actor and model (1966–1997)

- Born: Rommel Eugene Hunt; 4 July 1966; Alabaster, Alabama, U.S.
- Died: 23 October 1997 (aged 31); DeKalb County, Atlanta, Georgia, U.S.
- Other names: Rommel E. Hunt; Steve Foxx; Steven Fox; Steven Foxx
- Education: Druid Hills High School; Oxford College of Emory University
- Occupations: Actor; model
- Years active: 1991–1997
- Agent(s): American Productions; Falcon Studios
- Partner: Jim Brams

Rommel Eugene Hunt (July 4, 1966 – October 23, 1997), known professionally as Steve Fox, was an American adult film actor and model who became a prominent figure in gay adult cinema during the 1990s. Known for his classic American aesthetic and athletic physique, Hunt starred in several defining adult videos of the VHS era, culminating in vehicles specifically designed around his industry stardom, such as Fox's Lair (1995). His career spanned from 1991 until his death in 1997.

== Early life and education ==
Rommel Eugene Hunt was born on July 4, 1966, in Alabaster, Alabama. He was the son of Dale E. Hunt and Jessica K. Hunt (née Karoliszyn), both of whom were practicing physicians.

When Hunt was six years old, his family relocated to Atlanta, Georgia, where he spent the remainder of his youth. He attended Druid Hills High School in iconic DeKalb County, graduating in the mid-1980s. He pursued higher education at Oxford College of Emory University, a liberal arts campus in Oxford, Georgia.

== Career ==
=== Debut and early roles (1991–1993) ===
In 1991, Hunt entered the adult entertainment industry under the stage name "Steve Fox". He made his formal screen debut that same year in Compulsion (also distributed as Compulsion - He's Gotta Have It), directed by prominent adult filmmaker Steven Scarborough. The film established his on-screen persona and quickly led to further casting opportunities. Later in 1991, he appeared in Secret Shore Leave.

Fox followed his debut with a role in the 1992 production Buttbusters, which further capitalized on his growing recognition as a model and performer within the gay adult video boom of the early 1990s.

=== Success and peak years (1994–1996) ===
By 1994, Fox had transitioned from supporting roles to leading status, entering his most prolific period. That year, he starred in several high-profile features, including All American, where he played a character integrated under his own screen moniker "Steve". as well as Flashpoint (also known as Flashpoint: Hot As Hell), Moments To Spare, and Foul Play.

Fox's commercial popularity peaked in 1995 with the release of Fox's Lair. The feature was specifically conceptualized, written, and marketed around Fox's industry stardom and established screen persona, featuring him in the lead role of Mark. He continued regular work into the following year, appearing in the 1996 release Slings And Things.

=== Final roles and posthumous releases (1997) ===
As personal difficulties began to impact his output, Fox's screen appearances grew less frequent. His final performance filmed during his lifetime was a minor appearance as "Bedroom Guy #2" in the 1997 feature Johnny Hormone.

Following his death in late 1997, unreleased archival footage and scenes featuring Fox continued to be compiled and distributed by adult film studios. Notable posthumous features using his likeness and archival scenes include Dude, Where's My Cock? (1998), Taskmasters (2002), Slings & Things, Vivid's (2004), and the retro compilation Jerkin' It Old Skool (2007).

== Personal life ==
Fox resided in the Atlanta metropolitan area during his adult years. For a significant period, he was in a committed relationship with partner Jim Brams. Outside of his modeling and film career, Fox was an avid chess player, played the accordion, and was a dedicated collector and reader of the theatrical caricatures and cartoons of Al Hirschfeld.

== Death ==
Hunt suffered from severe mental illness for at least two years leading up to his death. On October 23, 1997, Hunt died in Atlanta, Georgia, at the age of 31 from a self-inflicted gunshot wound. The DeKalb County medical examiner's office subsequently ruled the death a suicide. A memorial service was held in Atlanta on October 26, 1997, and was publicly noted in the local press.

== Filmography ==
=== Film ===
Year	Title	Role	Notes
1991	Compulsion - He's Gotta Have It	Steve	Debut
1991	Secret Shore Leave	Steve	
1992	Buttbusters	Steve	
1994	All American	Steve	
1994	Flashpoint: Hot As Hell	Motel Room Guest	
1994	Foul Play	Steve	
1994	Moments To Spare	Steven	
1995	Fox's Lair	Mark	
1996	Slings And Things	Handsome Guy	
1997	Johnny Hormone	Bedroom Guy	Posthumous release
1998	Dude, Where's My Cock?	Steven	Posthumous release
2002	Taskmasters	Beautiful Guy	Posthumous release
2004	Slings & Things, Vivid's	Steve	Posthumous release
2007	Jerkin' It Old Skool	Steven	Posthumous release
