= Francis Fox (disambiguation) =

Francis Fox was a member of the Senate of Canada.

Francis Fox may also refer to:

- Francis Fox (divine) (1675–1738), English divine
- Francis Fox (Bristol and Exeter Railway engineer) 1818–1914, English civil engineer
- Sir Francis Fox (civil engineer) (1844–1927), English civil engineer
- Francis Hugh Fox (1863–1952), English rugby player
- Francis John Fox (1857–1902), New Zealand soldier and farmer
- Francis Lane Fox (1899–1989), British Army officer and Yorkshire landowner

== See also ==
- Frances Fox (disambiguation)
- Frank Fox (disambiguation)
