= Ed Fox =

Ed Fox, Eddy Fox, or Eddie Fox may refer to:

== People ==
- Eddie Fox (fl. 1886–1895), Australian rules footballer
- Edward "Eddie" Fox, American contestant of Survivor: Caramoan
- Eddie Fox, a 19th century songwriter of a predecessor to the standard Li'l Liza Jane
- Ed Fox, a co-founder of the MIT Student Information Processing Board
- Ed Fox, a co-founder of HappySad Records

== Fictional characters ==
- Edward "Eddie" Fox, from the 1938 film Tarnished Angel
- Eddie Fox, from the 1983 film Deadly Lessons
- Ed Fox, from the 1997 film Volcano (1997 film)
- Eddy Fox, from the British soap opera Emmerdale; see List of Emmerdale characters (2009)

== See also ==
- Edwin Fox, a surviving 19th-century merchant sailing ship
- Richard Edwin Fox (1956–2003), American executed convicted murderer
- Edward Fox (disambiguation)
