= Frances Margaret Fox =

American children's writer (1870–1959)

Frances Margaret Fox (June 23, 1870 – March 1, 1959) was an American children's writer.

Frances Margaret Fox was born on June 23, 1870, in Framingham, Massachusetts, to Frances Mary (Franks) and James Fox. She was educated at the Kalamazoo Seminary in Kalamazoo, Michigan.

Between 1901 and World War II, Fox wrote 52 books for children. Her subject matter included folklore and legends. Many of her works were set in or around Mackinaw City, Michigan, and Mackinac Island, where she spent summers.

She died on March 1, 1959, in Detroit, Michigan.

== Works cited ==
- Dailey, Sheila (1982). "Little Bear and Other Stories: A Look at the Life and Works of Michigan Children's Author Frances Margaret Fox". The Great Lakes Review. 8 (1): 25–30. doi:10.2307/20172621. ISSN 0360-1846. JSTOR 20172621.
