= Freddie Fox =

Freddie Fox may refer to:

== People ==
- Freddie Fox (actor) (born 1989), English actor
- Freddie Fox (footballer) (1898–1968), English football goalkeeper
- Freddie Fox (jockey) (1888–1945), British horse racing jockey
- Freddie Foxxx (born 1969), also known as Bumpy Knuckles, American rapper

== See also ==
- Freddy Fox
- Frederick Fox (disambiguation)
- Fred Fox (disambiguation)
