= Fred Fox =

Fred Fox may refer to:

- Fred Fox (director) (1884–1949), English assistant director and film actor
- Fred Fox (musician) (1914–2019), American French horn player and educator
- Fred L. Fox (1876–1952), Justice of the Supreme Court of Appeals of West Virginia

== See also ==
- Freddie Fox (disambiguation)
- Frederick Fox (disambiguation)
- Cyril Fred Fox (1882–1967), English archaeologist
