= Edward Fox (painter) =

British landscape painter

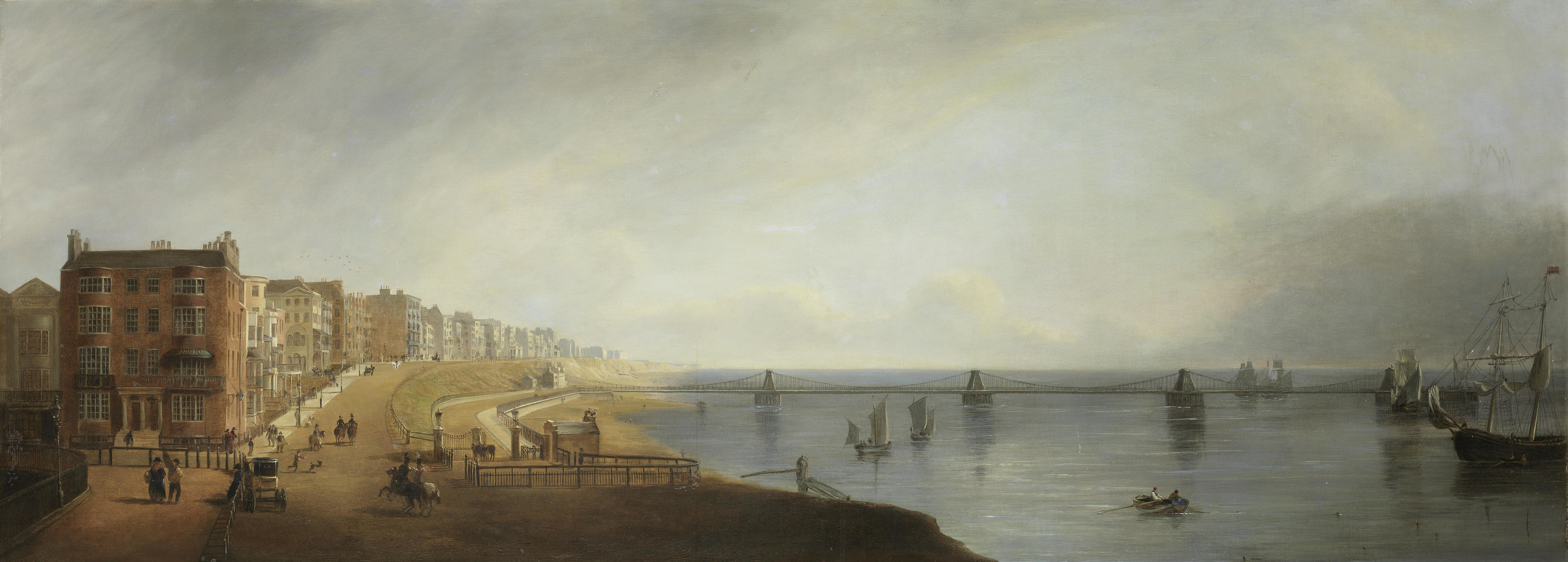
- The Chain Pier, Brighton
- Born: 1788
- Died: 1875
- Known for: Painting
- Movement: Impressionism

Edward Fox (1788–1875) was a British landscape painter, who was active from 1813 to 1854.

Paintings

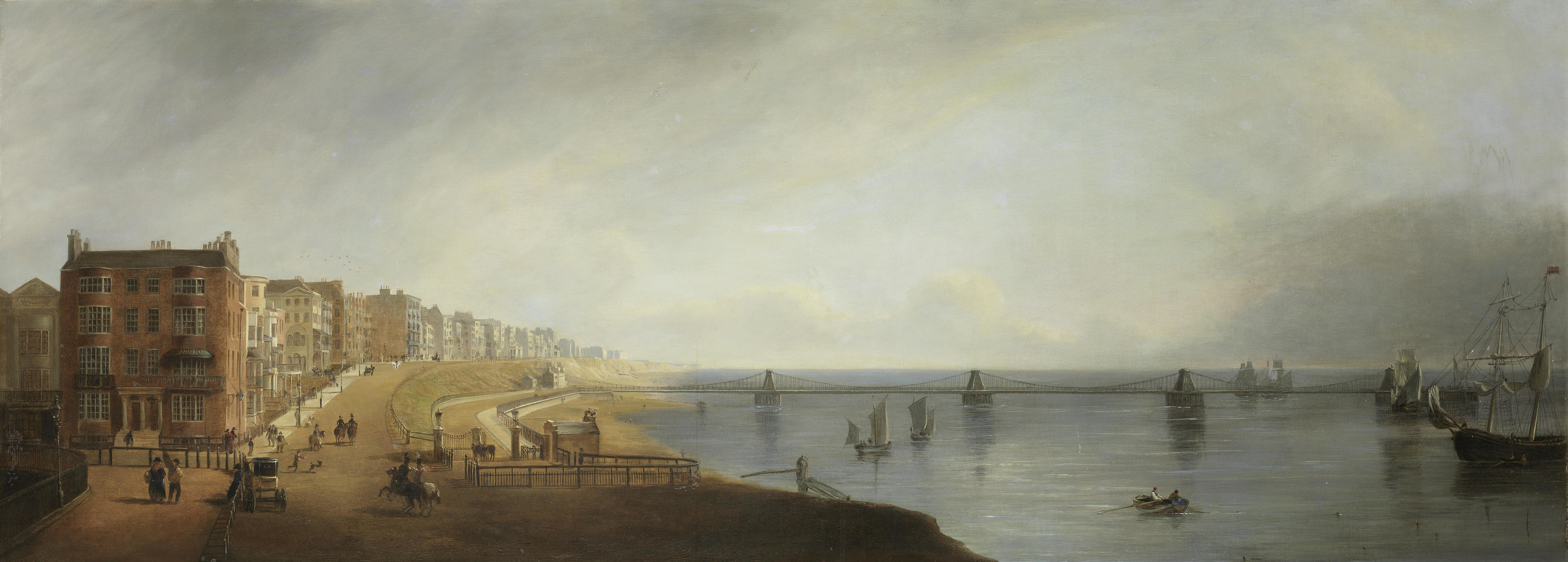
The Chain Pier, Brighton
