= Jennifer Fox =

Jennifer Fox may refer to:

- Jennifer Fox (documentary filmmaker) (born 1959), American documentary film director and producer
- Jennifer Fox (film producer), American fiction film producer
