= Frederick Fox (cricketer) =

English cricketer

Frederick Fox (7 November 1863 – 21 August 1935) was an English cricketer. He was a right-handed batsman who played for Nottinghamshire. He was born in Nottingham and died in Beltinge, Herne Bay.

Fox made two first-class appearances during the 1890 season, the inaugural season of the County Championship. He scored 23 of his 34 career runs in the second innings of his debut match, however, batting from the lower order in both of his games, he made little more of an imprint on the Nottinghamshire team's performances.
