= Peter Fox (librarian) =

British professional librarian

Peter Kendrew Fox (born 23 March 1949) is a British professional librarian. After eight years service in Cambridge University Library he moved to Dublin as deputy librarian of Trinity College in 1979; in 1984 he became College Librarian and Archivist. He became Librarian of the Cambridge University Library in 1994, a position he held for 15 years until his retirement in 2009. He has served on many public bodies concerned with libraries and archives. He was educated at King's College London (BA, 1971); the University of Sheffield (MA, 1973); Selwyn College, Cambridge (MA, 1976) and MA Dublin, 1984. In 2019, he was made an honorary fellow of Trinity College Dublin.

== Personal life ==
He married Isobel McConnell in 1983 and they have two daughters.

== Publications ==
- 1973: Reader Instruction Methods in Academic Libraries. Cambridge: University Library
- 1983: Third International Conference on Library User Education: proceedings; edited by Peter Fox and Ian Malley. Loughborough: INFUSE
- 1986: Treasures of the Library: Trinity College Dublin. Dublin: Royal Irish Academy ISBN 978-0-901714-45-9
- 1998: Cambridge University Library: the Great Collections. Cambridge: Cambridge University Press ISBN 0-521-62636-6 (editor)
- 2000: "The Librarians of Trinity College", in: Vincent Kinane, Anne Walshe, eds., Essays on the History of Trinity College Library, Dublin. Dublin: Four Courts Press ISBN 1-85182-467-7
- 2014: Trinity College Library Dublin: A History. Cambridge: Cambridge University Press ISBN 978-1107011205
