= Josephine Clardy Fox =

American businesswoman, musician, and philanthropist

Josephine Marsalis Clardy Fox (August 13, 1881 – May 11, 1970) was an American businesswoman, musician, and philanthropist. Clardy Fox lived most of her life in El Paso, Texas, where she donated land to build a school and a library. As a young person, she studied fine music and toured the United States and Europe. Parts of her estate and collections were left to the University of Texas at El Paso (UTEP).

== Biography ==
Clardy Fox was born on August 13, 1881, in Liberty Township in Missouri, and was an only child. When she was one year old, her parents, Allie and Zeno, moved to El Paso, Texas, where her father worked as a lawyer. She attended a religious school until 1891 and then entered public schools until 1895. That year, she went to Hosmer Hall in St. Louis for finishing school. In 1901, Josephine's father, Zeno died from a heart attack. After his death, Clardy Fox went to Berkeley, California, where she could get better training in the fine arts. She stayed with family friends and enrolled in a fine music school. The next year, she went to New York where she studied voice with Emilio Agramonte. She returned briefly to El Paso in 1902, where she performed as a soloist. Then she went on to tour the United States and Europe. One of the people traveling to Europe in 1908 with Josephine Clardy Fox was Eugene Emmett Fox, who she would later marry.

Josephine and Eugene married on January 20, 1916 in New York and made their home in El Paso. When the Great Depression hit El Paso, the couple and Josephine's mother had difficult times. Josephine helped her mother with the properties she managed in El Paso. On April 2, 1934, Eugene died after suffering an accident on a train. Josephine's mother died on March 23, 1940.

During World War II, Josephine Clardy Fox donated her time towards the war effort. She donated $1,000 to support the construction of the Southwestern Children's Home. During the mid 1940s, she and William J. Elliott began to develop land once used to grow cotton. Her real estate development grew her wealth. In 1955, Josephine Clardy Fox sold land to create the Fox Plaza Shopping Center in El Paso. In 1956, Clardy Fox donated land to the El Paso Independent School District to create a public school and in 1961, donated land for a public library in the El Paso Public Library system.

In 1959, Clardy Fox broke her hip and again, in 1964, she broke the same hip. After the second break, she spent the rest of her life in the Providence Memorial Hospital. She died there on May 11, 1970. Josephine Clardy Fox was buried in Evergreen Cemetery. In her will, she left most of her estate to the University of Texas at El Paso (UTEP). This donation also included her extensive hat collection.
