= Edward Fox (author) =

American writer (born 1958)

Edward Lyttleton Fox (born 1958 in New York), resident in London, is a writer from the United States.

== Published works ==
Edward Fox is the author of three books:

- Obscure Kingdoms: Journeys to distant royal courts (London: Hamish Hamilton, 1993, and Penguin, 1995, ISBN 0-14-014671-7).
- Palestine Twilight': the murder of Dr Albert Glock and the archaeology of the Holy Land (London: HarperCollins, 2001 and 2002, ISBN 0-00-638459-5).

Reprinted in the United States as Sacred Geography: A tale of murder and archaeology in the Holy Land (Henry Holt/Metropolitan Books, 2001 and 2002).
Spanish translation Crepusculo en Palestina (Barcelona: Alba Editorial, 2003).

- The Hungarian who walked to heaven: Alexander Csoma de Koros (London: Short Books, 2001, ISBN 0-571-20805-3). Life of traveller and philologist Sándor Kőrösi Csoma, 1784—1842
