= Frank Fox (Gaelic footballer) =

Irish Gaelic footballer and athlete

Personal information
- Born: 1911 Dunmore, County Galway, Ireland
- Died: 29 June 1940 (aged 28) Galway Central Hospital, Galway, Ireland
- Occupation: Great Southern Railways employee

Sport
- Sport: Gaelic Football
- Position: Left wing-back
Clubs
- Years: Club
- Dunmore McHales; Galway Gaels
Club titles
- Galway titles: 0
Inter-county
- Years: County
- 1933–1937: Galway
Inter-county titles
- Connacht titles: 2
- All-Irelands: 1
- NFL: 0

Frank Fox (1911 – 29 June 1940) was an Irish Gaelic footballer and athlete. His championship career with the Galway senior team lasted five seasons from 1933 until 1937.

Fox first played competitive Gaelic football with the Dunmore McHales club. He later joined the Galway Gaels club before ending his career with Dunmore McHales.

Fox made his debut on the inter-county scene when he was selected for the Galway junior team. He enjoyed one championship season with the junior team, culminating with the winning of an All-Ireland medal in 1931. He subsequently joined the Galway senior team and made his debut during the 1933 championship. Over the course of the next few seasons Fox won one All-Ireland medal as well as back-to-back Connacht medals.

After being selected for the Connacht inter-provincial team for the first time in 1934, Fox was a regular choice on the starting fifteen for the following few seasons. During that time he won two Railway Cup medals.

The trophy for the Galway Senior Football Championship is named in his honor. Presented to Galway in 1951 by Frank's brother Tom who lived in America. The Army side based in Renmore were the first team to lift the Frank Fox Cup.

== Honours ==
Galway

- All-Ireland Senior Football Championship (1): 1934
- Connacht Senior Football Championship (2): 1933, 1934
- All-Ireland Junior Football Championship (1): 1931
- Connacht Junior Football Championship (1): 1931

Connacht

- Railway Cup (2): 1934, 1936
