= Peter Fox (artist) =

American painter

Peter Fox is a New York City artist who attended the Tyler School of Art in Philadelphia and Rome, receiving an MFA in painting before settling in Brooklyn, New York.

Fox has internationally exhibited his conceptually-driven "Process" and "Word" series paintings in such venues as Pierogi, Roebling Hall, Eyewash Gallery, Esso Gallery, ISE Cultural Foundation, The Hogar Collection, White Box and The University Art Museum at State University of New York in New York, The Hunterdon Art Museum and Rupert Ravens Contemporary in New Jersey, Curator's Office (Washington, DC), Arin Contemporary Art/Dust Gallery (Laguna Beach/Las Vegas), Scott Richards Contemporary Art (San Francisco), Docks Art Fair (Lyon), Galleria Milano (Milan), Galleria Martano (Turin) and Magazzino d’Arte Moderna (Rome). His work has been featured in The Brooklyn Rail, ArtNotes, WAGMAG, The Washington Post, Segno and TimeOut Roma, among other publications.
