= List of FoxTrot characters =

The FoxTrot family members (clockwise, beginning at the top): Roger, Andy, Quincy, Paige, Jason, Peter

This article contains information on the central characters in FoxTrot, a comic strip created by Bill Amend. The strip centers on a nuclear family composed of mother Andy, father Roger, and their three children Peter, Paige and Jason, along with several auxiliary characters.

== Main characters ==
=== Jason Fox ===
Jason Fox is the youngest child of the family and is considered the nerdiest person in the family. A 10-year-old boy who wears glasses (though his pupils are unseen), he is shown to be very intelligent, and is often relied on to help Roger with taxes, or Peter and Paige with homework. Unlike his siblings, who sometimes make him pay them to do their homework, Jason actually wants to do his homework, and often receives incredibly high marks as a result (to the point that 72 correct answers out of 20 questions is disappointing to him). He sometimes is disappointed when he has no homework because he did all the homework for the year in the first week of school. He tends to aggravate the teachers with his overly complicated answers, and is frequently in trouble for disrupting class. Despite his intellect, he is shown to take most things too literally on occasion. (Once, when Roger asked him for "java", meaning a cup of coffee, Jason gave him a mug with a printout from the Java programming language.) He also once placed an order for a pizza with "17/51 cheese, 109/327 sausage, and 86,499,328/259,497,984 mushroom" (which resulted in Roger receiving all his change in pennies and telling Jason that his ever being asked to order their pizza again was an "unlikely event"), and unsuccessfully makes attempts to get Roger and Andy to raise his allowance, which almost always results in sudden, sharp decreases in his pay.

Like most stereotypical boys, Jason is a constant source of mischief. He is always coming up with jokes, pranks and tricks which include water bombs, snowballs, dart guns, squirt guns and other contraptions, Paige being his favorite target. She is also the center of his insults, like when he came up with a Slug-Man superhero comic, which included "Paige-o-Tron" as the villain, or uploading games to his website which included Pimple Command, Paige Invaders, Ms. Yap Man and Paige Don't Know Jack, on which she is respectively portrayed as a pimply, space alien, a constant talker on the phone and being unable to answer the easiest of questions. Although Paige is his regular target, Peter is sometimes the target of his tricks (such as reprogramming the auto-dial buttons on Peter's cell phone, resulting in Peter accidentally confessing to Andy about sneaking out when the Denise button dialed Andy's number instead). He also enjoys making comic strips with Slug Man (see below), substitutes for other cartoonists' work, e.g. Family Circus, or with his siblings as the characters, such as when he had a week of comic strips in which Paige was portrayed as a deadly monster (which resulted in Paige doing the same for him the following week).

Portrayed as a stereotypical nerd, he has an interest in science fiction, particularly Star Wars, Star Trek and role-playing games (primarily the fictional fantasy-themed MMORPG "World of Warquest", a portmanteau of World of Warcraft and EverQuest), as well as a high level of knowledge in mathematics and science. He also seems to have a high interest in comic books and dinosaurs. In a few strips, it is revealed that he likes Pokémon and Yu-Gi-Oh! cards, as well as the fictional "Linuxmon", blending his interest in programming with video games and card games, and brings them to school. Jason is also a frequent user of the family computer, and has been shown to be an amazing programmer, repeatedly constructed his own computer programs (including a search engine, which he built before breakfast) and viruses, which he often sends to the other computers in the house and Eileen Jacobson. He also has written at least two viruses that caused worldwide havoc, called the "Darth Jason" and "I-Don't-Love-You-Eileen-Jacobson". He included a copyright line in the latter, and in the former he eliminated the Internet (and Jason's web company, "Jasonzonbayhoo") as a result. It is also shown that Jason is a terrific snow sculptor. When it snows he and his best friend Marcus build monsters out of snow to scare Paige. Another example is a storyline in which Andy tells him to go outside instead of playing video games, so he and Marcus build the environments of their favorite video games to play in. In addition, he plays video games regularly — either by himself, with Peter, with Roger, or with Marcus. In one series of strips, Paige plays one of his games and is more adept at it than Jason to his frustration, with common sense assisting her. He frequently attempts to recreate the work of cartoonists while they are on hiatus, usually as an excuse to make fun of Paige. He also makes his own comic called Slug Man, a parody of Superman and Batman. Occasionally, Jason will make exaggerated plans of his own, such as a large-scale animatronics Christmas display (which has everything but a sound system playing "Jingle Bell Rock" all day) or a skyscraper comic book shop in his backyard (which is squashed by the zoning commission). Like Calvin from Calvin and Hobbes, Jason is shown to have a fear/hatred of girls (see below), but admits to slightly liking one of his only female friends, Eileen Jacobson. He sometimes falls prey to advertising ploys, as illustrated in a 1991 arc where he becomes obsessed for a short while with The Simpsons products.

=== Paige Fox ===
Paige Fox is the middle child of the Fox family. A 14-year-old high school freshman, she is always portrayed with her hair in a ponytail. She enjoys shopping and will often demand that Peter drive her to the mall, sometimes using blackmail to force him into it.

Like the rest of the family, she has interests expected of her age group. Her obsessions include fashion, pop music (particularly boy bands and, in earlier strips, Madonna), modern fads and trends, and attractive teenage boys.

A running gag through the series is that she has a huge craving for candy and other sweets. For example, the ice cream man comes to her when she rings a bell and takes out his whole stock, asking Paige "the usual?". She has been shown to make a rainbow ice cream cone not by ordering rainbow sorbet, but instead by ordering seven different flavors in the colors of the rainbow, stacked in a rainbow shape in the right order on top of two cones. In an August 2013, strip she and Nicole suggest to a cupcake shop ideas for a pintcake, quartcake, 2litercake, and a galloncake, in case they ever wanted to expand beyond cupcakes. She shares her obsessions with her best friend, Nicole (see below). Paige often has sleepovers at Nicole's house to avoid Jason's pet iguana, Quincy (see below). She also appears to have an iPhone 4.

Although persistent in her pursuit of a boyfriend, she has almost never dated in the strip. A running gag is nerd Morton Goldthwait's interest in her, though she openly despises him. Paige has tried learning to cook to attract boys, but the food she makes is often inedible or burnt. One time, Paige burned all of her cookies so badly that Roger used them as a substitute for charcoal briquettes after Andy "directed him towards a stash." On another occasion, she used Diet Pepsi in baking Christmas cookies, thinking it was the same thing as baking soda. On yet another occasion, she burned the Thanksgiving turkey into charcoal with the oven's clean button, as the cookbook instructed her to "clean" the turkey.

Similar to Peppermint Patty from Peanuts, Paige often falls asleep in class, partly because she stays up late. She is slightly more diligent than Peter when it comes to schoolwork, but has had her own procrastination-related nightmares (like school starting two weeks early and getting a schedule with only math classes with quizzes every day). Paige will often ask Jason for help in homework, usually in the mathematics of geometry. However, he often gives her intentionally incorrect answers or charges her money in exchange for the correct ones. Paige also has difficulties with English class, particularly when reading Shakespeare.

Although she is not flabby, Paige is also shown to be in poor physical shape, not participating in any outdoor activities or organized sports, and the smallest amount of physical activity is shown to wear her out. She once auditioned for the school cheerleading team in an effort to attract boys, which ended in a debacle similar to Peter's attempts to join the baseball team.

=== Peter Fox ===
Peter Fox is the eldest child of the Fox family. A 16-year-old high school junior, he is regularly shown wearing a blue/purple and white baseball cap with the letter A on it, as well as a grey hooded sweatshirt and blue jeans. Occasionally, his cap has an "H" instead of an "A", but only as a benchwarmer for the high school baseball team. He is often seen with his hat on, even at odd times such as swimming. Peter has been seen hatless in places where it is blatantly rude to wear a ballcap indoors, such as church.

He is also depicted as having an exaggerated appetite, but is frustrated that no matter how much he eats, he cannot seem to gain any weight (except in one series of strips, where he gained 50 pounds at a pizza joint's all-you-can-eat pizza night, then losing it overnight by the Saturday strip.) He is also shown as a reckless driver, once claiming to have "flirted" with four-digit speeds. Peter has pulled many stunts with the family car, such as speeding, back-wheelies, deliberately spinning and fishtailing, driving so fast that zero-gravity was achieved, attempting to clear a yellow light from six blocks away, almost sideswiping Andy's car, and going over the speed limit while parallel parking.

Peter is a procrastinator, and one of the running gags of the strip is the many ways he dreams up to avoid doing his homework or household chores. He once bragged that he was "sick of homework from day one" in response to Paige claiming that she's starting to get sick of homework barely two months after the start of school, as well as becoming two weeks behind on schoolwork only one week into the year, a fact he seems to be proud of. As a result, he often crams homework and study into an all-night session (and once blasted the Hallelujah Chorus on his stereo to celebrate success). In desperation, Peter invented a high-caffeine concoction: coffee-tea (black coffee with a tea bag).

He also shows interest in sports, but is constantly shown to be inept at both football and baseball. This has been demonstrated by his name being preprinted on the list of people cut from the football team (and every other sports team, including girls' gymnastics). He even once had a dream of being a contender on the TV show American Gladiators but before the dream could be realized, he threw a muscle flexing in front of a mirror.

He is also seen as occasionally power hungry, especially when their parents are away, as shown in an early storyline in which he forced Paige and Jason to be his servants, baking him cookies, cleaning his room, and the like; before locking them in the basement for "mutiny".

Peter also holds other stereotypical interests for an adolescent male, including swimsuit models, video games, and guitar playing. He is known to be an avid Bruce Springsteen fan, once dating a girl named Susie Johnson only because she had Springsteen tickets, and during the Thursday strip, Peter touched Bruce's sweat. Since some of the earlier strips, Peter has been dating a blind girl named Denise Russo.

=== Andy Fox ===
Andrea "Andy" Fox is the mother of Peter, Paige, and Jason and the wife of Roger. She is portrayed in the strip as a 42-year-old mother. According to the strip, she graduated from a college prior to marrying, where she majored in English, but it is never revealed where she got her degree, so it could be possible she got it at a different university than her husband. While earlier strips portrayed her as a freelance writer and columnist for a local newspaper, references to her job were gradually dropped and she has mostly been portrayed as a stay-at-home mother. Andy has often clashed with her children about school. She fails to relate to Jason due to his interest in science whereas she was more artistic, and is entirely unsympathetic with Paige's and Peter's hatred of school, being under the impression that due to her own love of education, all her kids should also love it. Her locking horns with the kids on school is not without justification, as Peter and Paige are often shown as "go-nowheres", being lazy in school and rarely involved in extracurricular courses. Even on rare occasions Jason has flubbed his schoolwork, causing Andy to come down upon him.

Andy often prepares exaggerated vegetarian or vegan meals for her family (most often tofu, eggplants, spinach, beets, etc.), much to their chagrin, but she continues to try to get them to eat what she believes to be healthier meals. Another point of home living she places on her family includes lowering the thermostat to below-average temperatures in an attempt to lower the heating bill, which leads to contention from the kids (primarily Paige) who wish for it to be normal. She often criticizes her husband for his love of beer and meat, and children for what she sees as their bad habits, such as procrastination and use of improper grammar. She has been known to impose her will and beliefs rather harshly on her family, including Roger, such as occasions when she refused to buy coffee because she believed him to be "addicted" to it, and instructing Jason to play video games to prevent Roger from watching Super Bowl pre-game programming. In most cases, she has an intense hatred toward video games, often trying to get her kids disinterested in gaming. Her methods have ranged from directly throwing a console across the room during a particularly violent rant, to confiscating all games save for those approved by mother activist groups. This has also shown her to be something of a hypocrite as her attempt to use a Momvo to restrict her children's shows ended when it wouldn't record her soap operas.

Andy has been shown to be the most anger prone of the Fox family, although her anger never escalates to hurting others as Paige and Peter have been shown to do. She is easily the most high-strung member of the family and can start screeching about anything in an instant. It was never specified as to the source of Andy's anger, but hinted partly due to a combination of factors, the strained relationship with her mother, the somewhat strained relationship with her children's refusal to do things her way, and that her adult life has been poorer in comparison to the prosperous times she enjoyed as a child. Her father had a job similar to Roger's, but had a far more stable and rewarding career, whereas she shows annoyance that Roger's career is not progressing as well as her father's had when he was Roger's age.

Andy has also been shown as being obsessed with bills, as she always leaves the thermostat too low and subscribes to only the most basic necessities for a household. A running joke has been that during the winter the house has been cold enough to freeze things like hot drinks, the steam coming from Roger's coffee, and the family computer (literally); in one strip, she had the thermostat set below -297 degrees Fahrenheit. This is contrasted with the spendthrift attitude of the kids and their locking horns with Andy over this. Arguably because Roger's money pays the bills, he is also careful with expenses, but shows nowhere near the parsimony of his wife. Andy has also been shown to obsess over certain other fads, such as "Bitty Babies" (a parody of Beanie Babies), the movie Titanic, and the Nintendo DS game Nintendogs. Although Andy has been apparently disappointed in Roger's lot in life, she has been supportive that he works to put a roof over their head. A more serious story arc in FoxTrot was when Roger had been tasked by J.P. Pembrook to prepare a presentation to the board of directors to increase Pembrook's pay package by $300,000 - at a time when many of Roger's coworkers had been laid off due to low company profits. Andy is sympathetic with Roger's dilemma, and even suggests he should denounce Pembrook to his face.

=== Roger Fox ===
Roger Fox is the father of Peter, Paige, and Jason and the husband of Andy. According to the strip, he is 45 years old and was born in Chicago, Illinois. Roger has also stated that he majored in English studies at the fictional Willot College. He works at Pembrook and Associates. Roger's occupation is an unspecified white-collar office job, although his coworkers and his boss, Pembrook, have appeared in the strip.

His hobbies include golf, camping, and chess, though he has almost no talent at any of them (or virtually anything else he attempts). When he is golfing, he often hits the ball wildly and completely off target, when camping he always messes up something, and in chess he is defeated in mere seconds. In one strip, he flooded the house trying to use the dishwasher. He often tries to involve his family in his interests, usually by taking them on vacations. He is also portrayed as being highly out of step with modern technology, especially computers. Many strips also show that he is overweight, balding and in poor physical condition, to the point of his tires sinking just by him sitting inside his car. Despite his wife's attempts to get him to eat healthy foods and exercise, he rarely does so.

A running gag in the strip depicts the family grill shooting a giant pillar of fire into the sky whenever Roger tries to light it, typically burning him in the process. In one strip, the pillar reached Mars and destroyed a rover; in response, NASA called demanding money for the damages (Roger implied this has happened before).

He also finds it extremely difficult to fully wake up, having been depicted as requiring a large amount of coffee to start each day. Despite being rather clueless at times, he can be clever in some matters. He fares well enough as a family man and clearly cares for his wife and children.

== Other recurring characters ==
=== Roger's boss and coworkers ===
J.P. Pembrook is Roger's boss. In the strip, he always appears seated at his desk, with only his hands showing (and almost always folded). Pembrook is a stereotypical boss, showing little care about his company or his workers and is extremely greedy. In one strip, he has Roger be a clown for his son's 5th birthday party, resulting in Andy's anger at her husband being used in this manner. In another, slightly more serious storyline, Pembrook admits to Roger that the company has been in debt and laying off multiple workers; despite all this he has Roger convince the board to increase his CEO pay by $300,000. Roger, conflicted over the stress at home, is henpecked by an enraged Andy that he should tell off Pembrook.

Fred is Roger's best friend and coworker and they are often shown playing golf together. Fred seems to be the better golfer as seen in one strip where Fred had a score of 81 while Roger had a score of 180. Fred and the other workers like having Roger around since he often causes the office's computer network to crash, thereby preventing them from having to work.

=== Andy's contacts ===
Katie O'Dell is the baby daughter of one of Andy's friends, Margaret O'Dell. Paige sometimes babysits for her, usually with disastrous results. One time, Paige fell asleep on the job allowing Katie to find scissors and chop up her brand-new dress while wearing it. In another case Paige watched an adult show, Jerzy Spaniel (a parody of Jerry Springer) with Katie discovering a swear word, repeating it over and over. Another time, Paige gave her cake, making her exceedingly hyper. Another time, Katie had been punished and could not watch TV or videos for misbehaving more than usual that morning, leading to Katie repeatedly yelling "Blue's Clues!" for hours on end. Paige described her as "a broken nonstop tape recorder" on the Saturday strip.

Margaret O'Dell is one of Andy's friends in a book club and is the mother of Katie O'Dell. She is known to be very specific in details (such as with phone numbers or Katie's name). She usually pays Paige enough to make Paige happy to babysit again.

=== Peter's classmates and teachers ===
Denise Russo is Peter's blind girlfriend whom he met at school in the strip's first year. They are very close, and kiss constantly, although they do have their share of fights. Peter once attempted to break up with her so he could date other girls and "develop socially," but had a change of heart when he realized dating is not a rite of passage and there is no "appropriate" romance, and later admitted he was subject to peer pressure and media stereotypes. Denise has a manipulative streak and knows exactly how to get what she wants from Peter. In several strips, Paige and Jason blackmail him with photographs of the two together. Since the strip's move to Sundays-only publishing, Denise has hardly been mentioned or shown.

Steve Riley is Peter's best friend. Peter and Steve are often seen watching sports, or playing video games or guitar together. Steve works at Luigi's Pizza. He often lets Peter borrow his guitar instruments and amps, which usually ends up with Peter destroying most of the objects in the house. Paige once noted that Steve was "cute", much to Peter's chagrin. Despite his generally straight-laced nature, Steve had once tried to sponge answers off a test Peter had already taken, and Peter calls out Steve for his lousy ways.

Coach is Peter's unnamed baseball and football coach. For reasons unknown (other than Peter's implied lack of athletic skill), he always makes Peter sit on the bench during games, only using Peter in an emergency or when he needs a new bag of sunflower seeds.

The Physics Teacher is an unnamed man who teaches physics at Peter's high school. He wears glasses and a full beard. He seems to have little patience for the laziness of Peter and Steve, but will sometimes be helpful if he realizes students are making an honest effort. Sometimes Paige has been shown as a student of his classes.

The Theater Manager is Peter's boss at the movie theater where he has a summer job.

=== Paige's classmates and teachers ===
Nicole is Paige's best friend. She is also a high school freshman who has similar interests. Paige and Nicole sometimes go shopping together. The two once broke off their friendship after Nicole was able to get a date for the prom and Paige was not, but they soon reconciled. Nicole once had a crush on Peter, but that disappeared after she learned of his slovenly persona.

Morton Goldthwait is a stereotypical nerd who attends school with Paige, though he is half her size. Although Paige has mostly ignored him, he still has a crush on her. In a 1997 storyline, he was also Jason's summer camp instructor, running his part of the camp with a rod of iron and insisting that he be addressed as "Your glorious and all-powerful high eminence, sir." Jason had planned to set him up on a date with Paige as revenge, until he discovered that Morton actually liked Paige. Jason has also taken advantage of Morton's crush on Paige by arranging to have him become a part of her friends page on Facebook and sending him a "gushy love note" on her behalf. Despite Paige's distaste for Morton, she seems to be at least somewhat flattered by his crush on her, as on one occasion when Morton asks another girl to a school dance because he figures Paige would turn him down, and Paige reacts jealously. It is mentioned that he took the SATs, and was angry about getting "only" a 1590 out of a possible 1600. Jason considers him a stud, which of course infuriates Paige. Morton has been a part of many antics involving school activities. In one series of strips he formed the varsity e-football team, which plays video game football.

Dr. Ting is Paige's biology teacher at school. While generally kind and patient, he has been shown to have a sadistic streak, as on an occasion where he assigned his class a test that covered forty-six chapters.

Miss Rockbottom is Paige's Physical Education teacher. Despite appearing to be somewhat overweight herself, she is depicted as being very strict, once assigning more than 500 laps around the school track.

=== Jason's classmates, friends and teachers ===
Marcus Jones is Jason's best friend, and the only recurring African-American character in the strip. While similar to Jason in character, Marcus tends to be a little more sensible. Jason and Marcus usually play together, launching model rockets, flying kites, playing video games, or other activities, such as harassing Paige. Marcus has four sisters named Doreen, Lisa, Cybil, and Lana. He is always happy to take care of Quincy when Jason and the family go on vacation, so he can mess with his sisters; he also has a hamster.

Eileen Jacobson is one of Jason's classmates. She attempts to converse with Jason regularly, only for him to show discomfort around her. Their relationship appears to be a mixture of hatred and grudging respect (in addition to Jason's fear of girls in general), though there may be romantic subtexts in the relationship. In one extended 1998 storyline, Eileen managed to trick Jason into admitting that he did sort of "like" her, leading Jason to spend weeks trying to figure out how to undo his "mistake" through time travel. At this point they even begin dating, though this is seemingly short-lived when Jason tries to keep the relationship confidential so that his friends wouldn't shun him. In another 1996 story arc, Jason accidentally sends a love note that was meant to be for Andy for Mother's Day to Eileen, and it takes several strips to correct the mistake. Even Marcus thought Jason had Eileen's "cooties," which he confesses at the end of the strip. It is noted by Andy that Eileen has a "loud laugh". Eileen seems to have a knack for getting Jason to do whatever she wants him to do, as evidenced by a series of strips in which Eileen makes Jason be her partner on a school field trip in exchange for a Charizard card. She is also a fan of the Harry Potter franchise, and in spite of Jason attempting to compete, she manages to get him interested as well.

Miss O'Malley is Jason's teacher. At first, Jason disliked her because, unlike his former teacher, Miss O'Malley encouraged Jason's creativity (such as marking the sites of dinosaur bone discoveries on a map when he was only required to name the continents), but she eventually came to realize how big a problem Jason was. She sometimes forces Jason to stay after school and write sentences on the blackboard after he misbehaves. A common gag is that Jason tries to find excuses to stay at school when summer begins, despite Miss O'Malley's reminders for him to go home.

Phoebe and Eugene Wu: Phoebe is a friend of Eileen's who Jason and Marcus meet while attending science camp one summer. She and her younger brother, Eugene, are Chinese-American. While Phoebe appears to be a relatively normal girl, Eugene is an obnoxious braggart who does not get along well with Jason and Marcus and is regarded even by his big sister (who, it is mentioned, has a higher IQ than he) as an object of derision. Phoebe and Eileen are rivals of Jason and Marcus at first, but the rivalry ends when Jason and Marcus cast the votes for Phoebe and Eileen's science project to win over Eugene's in the camp's science fair, and the girls initiate Marcus and a reluctant Jason into their "super-secret friendship club." The Wu siblings return in a second extended story line a few years later involving the theft of Phoebe's camp journal. The culprit turned out to be Eugene, who had hoped to foster discord among the "friendship club" and thus bring about its disbandment; however, Phoebe punishes him by incorporating a new friendship club with a non-disbandment clause. They have since made occasional guest appearances.

=== Other ===
Quincy is Jason's pet iguana. Jason regularly uses him to tease Paige, either by waving the iguana in front of her, putting him in the bathtub while she is taking a bath, or throwing him on her. Other times he will let Quincy into her room so he can chew up her belongings and throw them up. At other times, Quincy just sits on Jason's head, while sometimes he dresses Quincy and himself up as various fictional characters, such as The Lone Iguana, Quincy John Adams, Quincynook, and QUINCE-E. Quincy's species has never been revealed, but it is most likely that he is a juvenile green iguana (Iguana iguana).

iFruit is a parody of the iMac computer. iFruit is the Fox's talking family computer which, upon being turned on, opens with the phrase, "Welcome to iFruit. Hug me". It first appears in a 1999 storyline in which Andy buys it on a computer shopping spree (namely after, in an earlier storyline, Roger sells the old computer in a yard sale after he ends up losing so much money day trading stocks), but only because it was "darling," much to the dismay of Jason. Later strips show that it has upgraded to resemble recent iMac flat-screen computers. However, the old model was shown in a recent strip in the Foxes' basement, where it is used in memory of Steve Jobs (following his death) via daylight saving time, with Andy stating that "you can't turn the clock back", and Jason replying that he just wants to pretend.

Pierre is an imaginary character from the strip's early years. Paige had recurring dreams of herself in a relationship with the French prince; these dreams are typically influenced by things happening in the strip's real world while Paige is asleep (Jason messing with her, Andy attempting to wake her up, etc.). In dreams where Paige and Pierre kiss, one can typically expect to in reality find Jason having Quincy kiss her.

Fauntleroy is the tiny pet dog of one of the Fox's neighbors. He is the main focal point of some arcs focusing on Peter, who is occasionally hired to take care of the dog, despite its tendency to bite.

=== Other family ===
Andy's mother (the maternal grandmother of Paige, Peter and Jason) has occasionally appeared in the strip. The grandmother is often referred to as "perfect"; as a result, Andy often feels inferior around her (according to the strip, this resentment started around seventh grade, as Andy's friends liked her mom more than her), and tries to prove herself by competing against her mother (usually by trying to cook a meal as well as her mother can). It has been mentioned that her cooking has won awards and that Martha Stewart has tried to get one of her recipes. She had also gifted the grandchildren with gifts more akin to their interests such as a Wii, which Andy has great disdain for.

Uncle Ralph is Roger's brother, an unseen character only mentioned during the early years of the strip, when the Fox family would go to "Uncle Ralph's Cabin" for, at one point, the ninth year in a row.
