= Peter Fox-Penner =

American author (born 1955)

- Born: Peter S. Fox; 1955 (age 70–71); Chicago, Illinois
- Citizenship: American
- Education: PhD
- Alma mater: University of Chicago
- Occupations: Researcher; Academic; Author
- Years active: 1980-Present
- Known for: Electric power industry
- Notable work: Power After Carbon

Peter Fox-Penner is an American academic and author known for his contributions to energy policy, economics, and the transformation of the electric power industry.

== Early life and education ==
Peter Fox-Penner was born in Chicago, Illinois, in 1955 to Seymour Fox and June Glickman Fox. His biological father was a former journalist and Illinois state senator. Peter was adopted by his mother's second husband, G. Lewis Penner, which led to the adoption of his hyphenated surname. The family later moved to Evanston, where Peter attended Evanston Township High School and graduated in 1972.

Peter pursued higher education at the University of Illinois Urbana-Champaign, earning a Bachelor of Science in electrical engineering and a Master of Science in mechanical engineering. From 1983 to 1987, he pursued a PhD. in business at the University of Chicago's Graduate School of Business.

== Career ==
In 1980, he began his career at the Illinois Governor's Office of Consumer Services (GOCS). Following the completion of his doctoral studies, Peter joined Charles River Associates. There he worked by advising utilities and energy companies on economic and regulatory matters. In 1993, he transitioned to public service, serving as Principal Deputy Assistant Secretary at the U.S. Department of Energy (DOE).

In 1996, Peter returned to the private sector, founding the Washington office of The Brattle Group (TBG), a global economics consulting firm. During his tenure at TBG, he provided expert testimony in many cases, including the litigation surrounding the California energy crisis of 2000.

In 2015, Peter joined Energy Impact Partners (EIP), a venture capital firm focusing on investments in clean energy technologies, as Chief Strategy Officer. Concurrently, he accepted an academic appointment as Professor of the Practice at Boston University's Questrom School of Business and founded the Institute for Sustainable Energy (now Institute for Global Sustainability). In 2022, Peter transitioned to the role of Chief Impact Officer at EIP.

== Publications ==
=== Books ===
- Fox-Penner, Peter S. (2020). Power After Carbon: Building a Clean, Resilient Grid (Hardcover). Harvard University Press (published 2020-05-19). ISBN 978-0-674-24107-7.
- Ren, Z. Justin; Fox-Penner, Peter S. (2019-07-07). Jermain, David (ed.). Melting the Ice: Lessons from China and the West in the Transition to Electric Vehicles: The Critical Role of Public Charging Infrastructure. Amazon Digital Services LLC. ISBN 9781099457692.
- Taylor, Gary; Ledgerwood, Shaun D.; Broehm, Romkaew; Fox-Penner, Peter S. (2015-06-25). Market Power and Market Manipulation in Energy Markets: From the California Crisis to the Present. Public Utilities Reports, Inc. ISBN 9780910325349.
- Fox-Penner, Peter S. (2010-04-05). Smart Power: Climate Change, the Smart Grid, and the Future of Electric Utilities (Hardcover). Island Press. ISBN 978-1-59726-706-9.
- Fox-Penner, Peter S. (1997). Electric Utility Restructuring: A Guide to the Competitive Era (Paperback). Public Utilities Reports. ISBN 978-0-910325-67-7.

=== Published Articles ===
- Fox-Penner, Peter S.; Hledik, Ryan; Lubershane, Andy (2020-06-01). "FixedBill+: making rate design innovation work for consumers, electricity providers, and the environment". Boston University.
- Fox-Penner, Peter; Gorman, Will; Hatch, Jennifer (2018-11-01). "Long-term U.S transportation electricity use considering the effect of autonomous-vehicles: Estimates & policy observations". Energy Policy. 122. Elsevier (published 2018-07-27): 203–213. Bibcode:2018EnPol.122..203F. doi:10.1016/j.enpol.2018.07.033. hdl:2144/39186. ISSN 0301-4215.
- Fox-Penner, Peter S.; Basheda, Greg (2001). "A Short Honeymoon for Utility Deregulation". Issues in Science and Technology. 17 (3). Arizona State University: 51–56. JSTOR 43314077.
- Fox-Penner, Peter S.; Pfeifenberger, Johannes; Hanser, phil; Basheda, Greg (1998-06-06). "In What Shape Is Your ISO?". The Electricity Journal. 2 (6). Elsevier: 80–87. Bibcode:1998ElecJ..11f..80P. doi:10.1016/S1040-6190(98)00055-4.
- Palmer, Karen; Simpson, David; Toman, Michael; Fox-Penner, Peter (1993-10-01). "Electricity fuel contracting: Relationships with coal and gas suppliers". Energy Policy. 2 (10). Elsevier: 1045–1054. doi:10.1016/S0301-4215(06)80007-8. ISSN 0301-4215.

== Music ==
Peter developed a passion for music and recording during college, establishing a studio for recording. He plays semi-professional jazz and R&B drums. Later, he teamed up with musicians Mark Rubel and Tim Vear to focus on commercial recording. By 1983, Rubel took over, renaming the studio Pogo Records with a reputation for modern and tube-based gear. Peter remained connected to Pogo Records until Rubel's passing in 2024.
