= Mary Frank Fox =

American sociologist

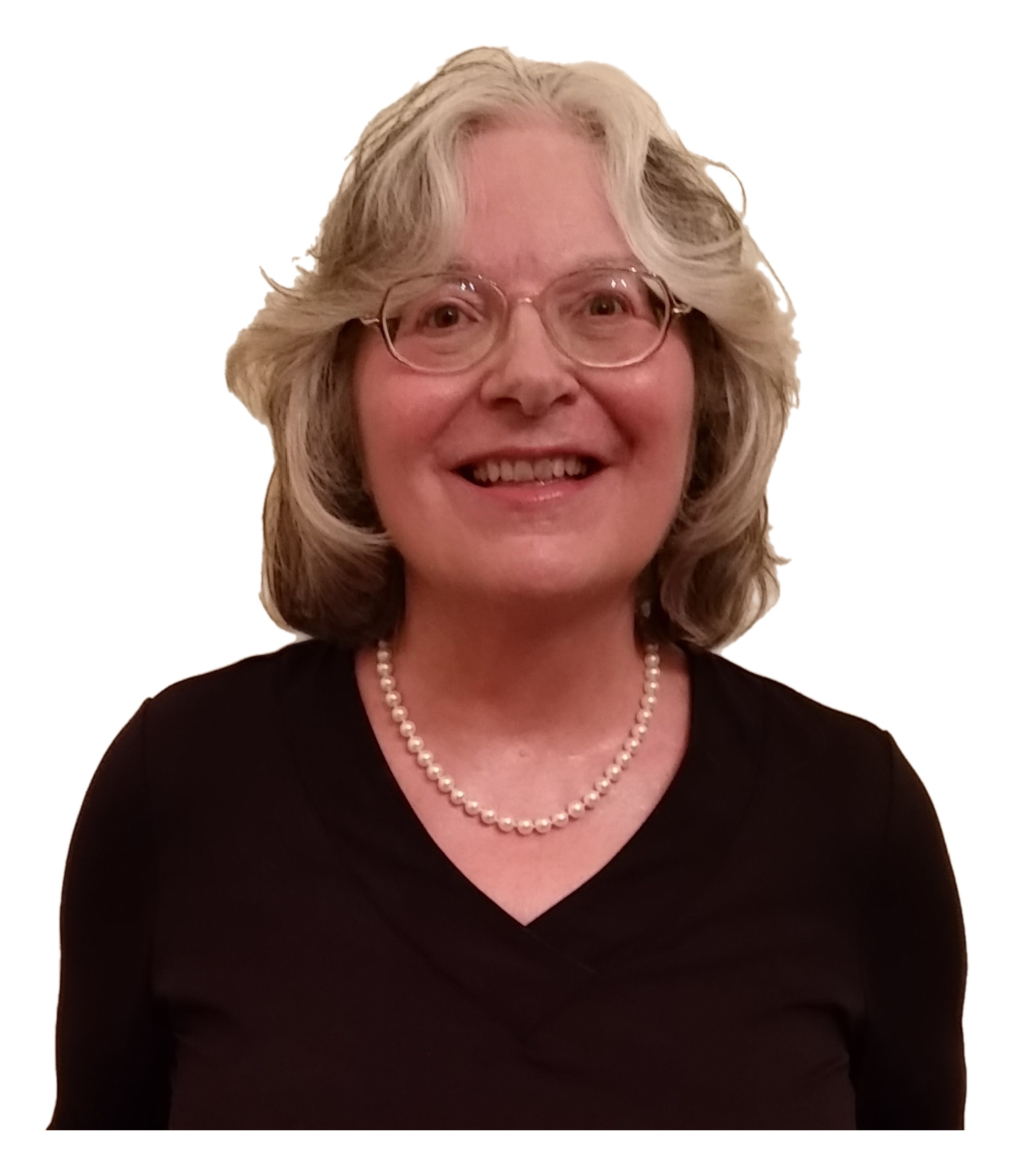
- Title: Dean's Distinguished Professor
- Awards: Fellow, American Association for the Advancement of Science (elected 2017); Distinguished Research Award, Ivan Allen College, Georgia Institute of Technology (2017); Section Star Award, Section on Science, Knowledge, and Technology, American Sociological Association (2015); Betty Vetter Award for Research, Women in Engineering Pro-Active Network (2002); Feminist Lecturer Award, Sociologists for Women in Society (2000)

Academic background
- Education: Ph.D. in Sociology, The University of Michigan

Academic work
- Discipline: Sociology
- Sub-discipline: Gender, Science/Engineering, Education and Careers, Organizations, Science Policy
- Institutions: Georgia Institute of Technology
- Main interests: The studies of gender, science, and engineering
- Website: https://sites.gatech.edu/mffox

Mary Frank Fox is Dean's Distinguished Professor in the School of Public Policy at the Georgia Institute of Technology. She is a pioneer and leader in the study of women and men in academic and scientific occupations and organizations. Her work has introduced and established the ways that participation and performance in science reflect and are affected by complex social-organizational processes. Fox's research is published in over 60 different scholarly and scientific journals, books, and collections, including Social Studies of Science, Science, Technology, and Human Values, Sociology of Education, Annual Review of Sociology, and The Journal of Higher Education.

== Education and professional history ==
Fox received a B.A., M.A., and Ph.D. in Sociology from The University of Michigan. She became a faculty member at Ivan Allen College of Georgia Institute of Technology in 1993. Fox spearheaded the proposal for Georgia Tech's NSF ADVANCE Institutional Transformation grant. She was Ivan Allen College ADVANCE Professor (2001–2021). Additionally, she is the co-director of the Center for the Study of Women, Science, and Technology at Georgia Institute of Technology.

In 2002, she was awarded the Women in Engineering Pro-Active Network's Betty Vetter Award for Research for notable achievement in research regarding women in engineering. In 2015, she received an award as "Section Star" from the Science, Knowledge, and Technology Section of the American Sociological Association. On September 16, 2016, Fox received the "Gender Equity Champion Award" for her research and commitment to gender equity. In 2017, she won the Ivan Allen College Distinguished Research Award and the Faculty of the Year Award of the Student Government Association. She was elected as a Fellow of the American Association for the Advancement of Science in 2017. In 2020, she was elected Chair of the Section on Social, Economic, and Political Sciences of the American Association for the Advancement of Science and in 2022 named member at large of the Section.

She brings issues of diversity and equity in science through her work with advisory boards and panels including those as: Member (and twice past chair) of the Social Science Advisory Board, National Center for Women and Information Technology; Council Member (twice elected), Section on Science, Knowledge, and Technology, American Sociological Association; Advisory Board, Expanding Computer Education Pathways Alliance; Editorial Board Member of the leading journal, Social Studies of Science; and recently elected member of the American Association for the Advancement of Science (AAAS), Electorate Nominating Committee, Division on Social, Economic, and Political Sciences, and elected to the AAAS Nominations Committee (at large).

== Research ==
Fox's research has introduced and established ways in which the participation and performance of women and men reflect and are affected by social and organizational features of science and academia. She has addressed these complex processes in a range of research encompassing education and educational programs, collaborative practices, salary rewards, publication productivity, social attributions and expectations, academic careers, and features of the research specialty of women, science, and engineering.

Her work has shaped understandings of:

1. ways that team composition, modes of collaboration, work practices, and work climate explain publication productivity—including exceptional performance—among scientists (Fox and Mohapatra, 2007).
2. individual and organizational factors that predict “being prolific in science” (Fox and Nikivincze, 2021).
3. distinguishing bibliometric features of the research specialty of women, science, and engineering, including the use of "sex" and "gender" in publications over time (Fox et al., 2022).
4. relationships between family characteristics and publication productivity among women and men in academic science that go beyond being married or not married and the presence/absence of children and that address the effects of type of marriage (first or subsequent, and occupation of spouse) and type of family composition (age/stage of children) (Fox, 2005).
5. patterns and predictors of work-family conflict in academic science that both vary, and converge, by gender in unexpected ways, with implications for building institutions that support strong scientific work forces (Fox et al., 2011).
6. types of programs—organized initiatives intended to open pathways—for undergraduate women in science that do (and do not) support attainment of women as majors in science and engineering (Fox et al., 2009; Fox et al., 2011).
7. social and organizational features of departments, research groups, and advisor-advisee relationships that influence the proportions of doctoral degrees awarded to women in science and engineering (Fox, 2000).

== Contributions to sociology of science ==
Fox devoted many years of her work to the sociology of science being one of the founders of the subfield of gender, science, and academia. Using Merton's (1961/1973) concept of "strategic research sites," she has argued that science and academia are "strategic research sites" for studies of gender and inequality. Both gender relations and science are hierarchically structured. Gender hierarchy is constituted by processes where men and women are "differentially ranked and evaluated" (Fox, 2004) and science "reflects and reinforces gender stratification" (Fox, 1999, 2001, 2007). In her studies of scientific indicators, she demonstrated stratification of academia by field, gender, rank, and publication productivity. In her studies of scientific education, careers, and workplaces, she identified social and organizational characteristics of work that relate to participation, publication productivity, and performance in science and academia.

== Publications ==
=== Books ===
- Mary Frank Fox; Sharlene Hesse Biber (1984). Women at Work. Palo Alto, California: Mayfield Publishing. ISBN 978-0-87484-525-9.
- Mary Frank Fox, ed. (1985). Scholarly Writing and Publishing: Issues, Problems, and Solutions. Boulder, Colorado: Westview Press. ISBN 978-0-8133-0039-9.
- ——; Deborah Johnson; Sue Rosser, eds. (2006). Women, Gender, and Technology. Urbana: University of Illinois Press. ISBN 978-0-252-07336-6.

=== Recent, selected articles and chapters ===
Mary Frank Fox's articles are based on research projects using multiple methods of primary data collection: survey research, face-to-face interviews, site visits/case studies, and bibliometric measures. Her articles appear in over 60 different scholarly and scientific journals, books, and collections.

- Mary Frank Fox, Diana Roldan, Gerhard Sonnert, Amanda Nabors, and Sarah Bartel. "Publications About Women, Science, and Engineering: Use of Sex and Gender in Titles over a Forty-six-year Period." Science, Technology, and Human Values (July 2022): 774–814.
- Mary Frank Fox and Irina Nikivincze. "Being Highly Prolific in Academic Science: Characteristics of Individuals and their Departments." Higher Education 81(2021): 1237–1255.
- Mary Frank Fox and Monica Gaughan. "Gender, Family, and Caregiving Leave, and Advancement in Academic Science: Effects across the Life Course." Sustainability 13(12), 2021.
- Mary Frank Fox. "Gender, Science and Academic Rank: Key Issues and Approaches." Quantitative Science Studies 1(3, 2020): 1001–1006.
- Mary Frank Fox. "Gender and Clarity of Evaluation Among Academic Scientists in Research Universities." Science, Technology, & Human Values 40 (July 2015): 487–515.
- Mary Frank Fox, Carolyn Fonseca, and Jinghui Bao. "Work and Family Conflict in Academic Science: Patterns and Predictors Among Women and Men in Research Universities." Social Studies of Science 41 (October 2011): 715–735.
- Mary Frank Fox, Gerhard Sonnert, and Irina Nikiforova. "Programs for Undergraduate Women in Science and Engineering: Issues, Problems, and Solutions." Gender & Society 25 (October 2011): 589–615.
- Mary Frank Fox, Gerhard Sonnert, and Irina Nikiforova. "Successful Programs for Undergraduate Women in Science and Engineering: Adapting vs. Adopting the Institutional Environment." Research in Higher Education 50 (June 2009): 303–353.
- Mary Frank Fox. "Institutional Transformation and the Advancement of Women Faculty: The Case of Academic Science and Engineering." In Higher Education: Handbook of Theory and Research, vol. 23. Edited by J. C. Smart. Springer Publishers, 2008.
- Mary Frank Fox and Sushanta Mohapatra. "Social-Organizational Characteristics of Work and Publication Productivity Among Academic Scientists in Doctoral Granting Departments." The Journal of Higher Education 78 (Sept/Oct 2007): 542–571.
- Mary Frank Fox. "Gender, Family Characteristics, and Publication Productivity Among Scientists." Social Studies of Science 35 (February 2005): 131–150.
- Mary Frank Fox. "Women, Science, and Academia: Graduate Education and Careers." Gender & Society 15(October 2001):654-666.
- Mary Frank Fox and Paula E. Stephan. "Careers of Young Scientists: Preferences, Prospects, and Realities by Gender and Field." Social Studies of Science 31(February 2001):109-122.
- Mary Frank Fox. "Gender, Hierarchy, and Science." In Handbook of the Sociology of Gender. Edited by J. S. Chafetz. New York: Kluwer Academic/Plenum Publishers, 1999.
