= Jack Fox (baseball) =

American baseball player (1885-1963)

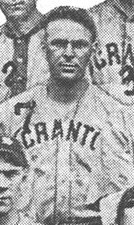
- Outfielder / Pitcher
- Born: July 26, 1880; Reading, Pennsylvania, U.S.
- Died: April 14, 1923 (aged 37); Poughkeepsie, New York, U.S.
- Batted: Right Threw: Right

MLB debut
- June 2, 1908, for the Philadelphia Athletics

Last MLB appearance
- June 20, 1908, for the Philadelphia Athletics

MLB statistics
- Batting average: .200
- Hits: 6
- Runs: 2
- Stats at Baseball Reference

Teams
- Philadelphia Athletics (1908)

John T. Fox (July 26, 1880 – April 14, 1923) was an American professional baseball player whose career spanned 11 seasons, including one in Major League Baseball. During that one season in 1908, Fox played with the Philadelphia Athletics. Fox compiled a major league batting average of .200 with two runs, six hits and two stolen bases in nine games played. Fox also played in the minor leagues with the Class-C Poughkeepsie Colts (1906), the Class-B Albany Senators (1906–07), the Class-A Jersey City Skeeters (1908), the Class-A Memphis Egyptians (1908), the Class-B Wilkes-Barre Barons (1909), the Class-B Troy Trojans, the Class-A Lincoln Railsplitters (1910–11), the Class-B Harrisburg Senators (1912–14), the Class-D Bradford Drillers (1914) and the Class-B Scranton Miners (1915–16). He started his minor league career as an outfielder, but later converted into a pitcher. Fox compiled a career minor league batting average of .251 with 670 hits in 694 games played. As a pitcher, he compiled a win–loss record of 90–63 in 185 career minor league games pitched. Fox batted and threw right-handed.

== Professional career ==
Fox began his professional baseball career in 1906 with the Poughkeepsie Colts, who were members of the Class-C Hudson River League. With the Colts, he batted .179 with 60 hits in 337 at-bats. Fox committed four errors, 12 assists and 120 putouts in 136 total chances as an outfielder. Fox then joined the Class-B Albany Senators, who were members of the New York State League. In 135 games played with the Senators, Fox batted .268 with 136 hits. On defense, Fox played in the outfield and committed nine errors, 12 assists and 217 putouts in 238 total chances. Between the two clubs that season, he batted a combined .232 with 196 hits in 845 at-bats, and compiled a .965 fielding percentage as an outfielder. In 1907, Fox spent the entire season with Albany. He batted .276 with 106 hits in 114 games played that season.

Before the 1908 season, Fox was drafted by the Class-A Memphis Egyptians of the Southern Association. With the Egyptians, Fox batted .243 with 17 hits in 18 games played. Connie Mack, manager of the Philadelphia Athletics, acquired Fox from the Memphis club during early June. Fox's addition to the Athletics roster was due to a depleted outfield. On June 2, 1908, Fox made his major league debut. Sporting Life described it as an "unimpressive" debut. After suffering a hand injury in mid-June, Fox was unable to accompany the Athletics on a road trip. During his final game in the majors on June 20, Fox made a base running error that ended the Athletics comeback against the Cleveland Naps in the eighth inning. With the Athletics that season, Fox batted .200 with two runs, six hits and two stolen bases in nine games played. On defense, he played eight games in the outfield, committing one errors in 13 total chances. Fox finished the 1908 season with the Class-A Jersey City Skeeters of the Eastern League. In 57 games with the Skeeters, Fox batted .268 with 59 hits, nine doubles, four triples and two home runs.

After the 1908 season, the National Commission ruled that Fox's contract was held by the Memphis Egyptians, the team which the Philadelphia Athletics acquired him from. The Egyptians promptly sold him to the Class-B Wilkes-Barre Barons of the New York State League. During the 1909 season, Sporting Life described the Wilkes-Barre trio of Fox, Delos Drake and Rube DeGroff as the "best outfielders in the league". In late July, the Barons traded Fox to the Class-A Troy Trojans. Fox batted a combined .271 with 131 hits in 129 games played between the two clubs. On defense, he played all of his 129 games as an outfielder. His hits total ranked 12^{th} amongst New York State League batters that season.

== Personal life ==
Fox was born on May 21, 1885, in Reading, Pennsylvania.

During World War I, he went to France on behalf of the Knights of Columbus to organize sports for the troops. After returning, he suffered a nervous breakdown and moved between Holyoke, Massachusetts, New Jersey and Poughkeepsie, New York. He died in Poughkeepsie in April 1923.
