= David G. Fox =

United States Army general

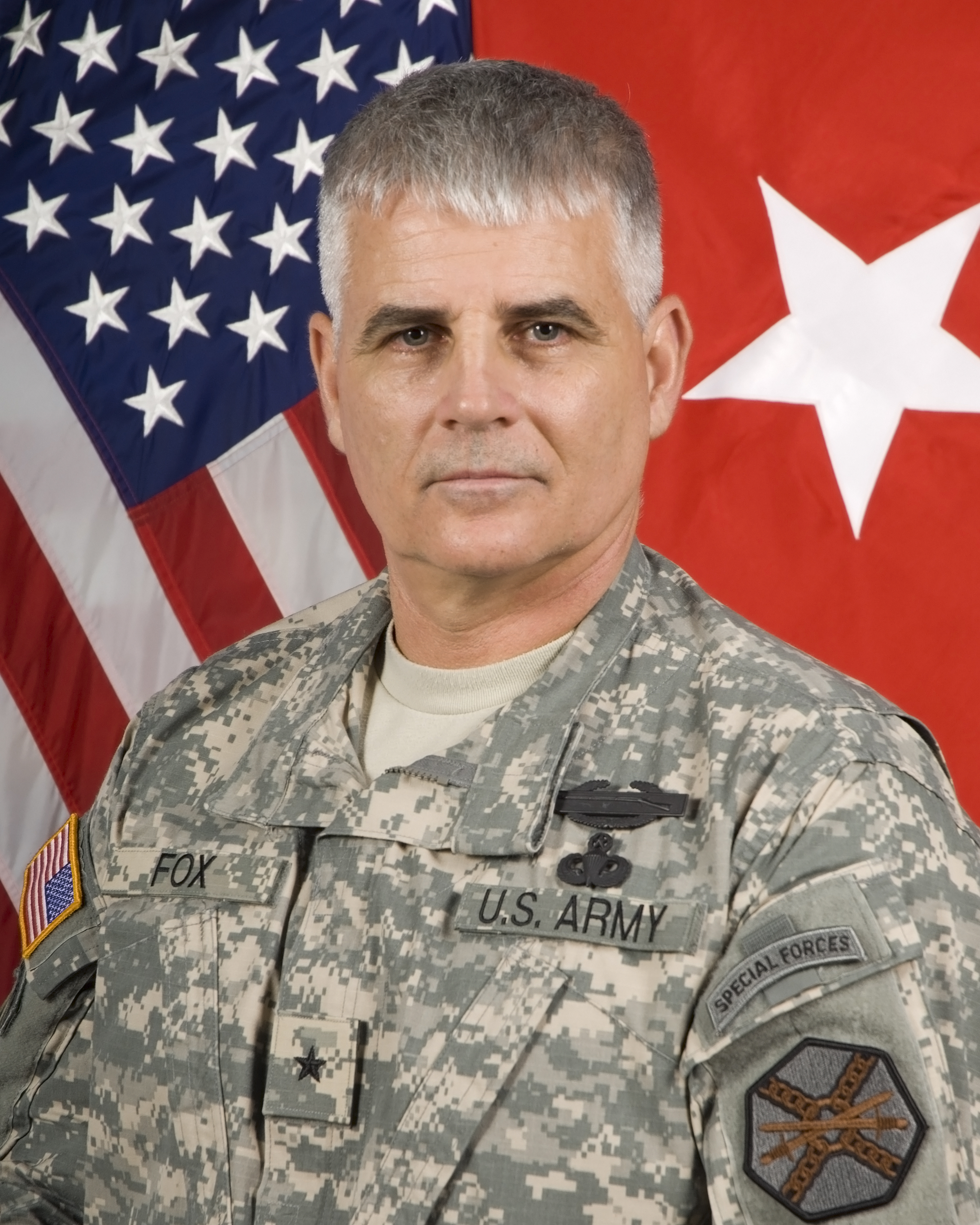
- Brigadier General David G. Fox
- Military career
- Allegiance: United States of America
- Branch: United States Army
- Service years: 1980 - 2014
- Rank: Brigadier General
- Units: 3rd Special Forces Group; 5th Special Forces Group
- Commands: B Company, 2nd Battalion, 3rd Special Forces Group; 2nd Battalion, 5th Special Forces Group; Iraqi Assistance Group
- Conflicts: Operation Uphold Democracy; War in Afghanistan
- Awards: Legion of Merit; Bronze Star; Purple Heart

Brigadier General David G. Fox is a retired United States Army officer who served as the commanding general of the Installation Management Command Korea Region.

== Military career ==
Fox began his military career as an enlisted soldier. After completing officer candidate school, he was commissioned a 2nd lieutenant in the infantry in 1982. His first assignment was with the 6-31st Mechanized Infantry Battalion at the National Training Center, Ft. Irwin, CA where he served as a platoon leader and company executive officer.

After volunteering for Special Forces Training and the successful completion of the Special Forces Officer Qualification Course, he was assigned as an Operational Detachment-Alpha Commander, ODA 544 in the 2nd Battalion 5th Special Forces Group at Ft. Bragg, North Carolina. His next assignment was to Company A, 1st Battalion, 1st Special Warfare Training Group (Airborne) as a Small Group Instructor in the Officer Qualification Course and he finished his tour as the executive officer in Company G, 1st Battalion responsible for the Special Forces Assessment and Selection Course.

His next assignment took him to Little Rock AFB in Arkansas and the Joint Readiness Training Center (JRTC) where he served as an operational detachment-alpha observer/controller. During his second year the JRTC was restationed to Ft. Polk, LA where he finished his assignment as the Special Operations Detachment, operations officer. He again returned to Fort Bragg, N.C., where he commanded B Company, 2nd Battalion, 3rd Special Forces Group. During his tenure he led his company to Haiti during Operation Uphold Democracy.

After completing company command, he attended the Command and General Staff College at Ft. Leavenworth, KS. Returning to Ft. Bragg, he served in multiple assignments culminating as the executive officer to the commanding general, United States Army Special Operations Command (USASOC). Completing his assignment to USASOC, he moved to Ft. Campbell, KY where he served as the deputy commander of the 5th Special Forces Group. After selection for battalion command, he assumed command of the 2nd Battalion, 5th Special Forces Group. While in command he led the 2nd Battalion during Operation Enduring Freedom in Afghanistan.

After completing command, he was again assigned to the JRTC at Fort Polk, where he commanded the Special Operations Training Detachment and was the senior Special Operations Forces observer/controller. While assigned to JRTC, he was selected for the Army War College at Carlisle Barracks, PA. After Graduation he was assigned to The Army Staff as the executive officer to the Military Deputy for Financial Management and Comptroller. Following his assignment to the Army Staff, he returned to Ft. Bragg where he commanded the U.S. Army Garrison, Ft. Bragg. After command, the Army assigned him as the Commander of the Iraqi Assistance Group, Camp Victory Iraq.

Fox's military education includes the United States Army War College, Command and General Staff College, Combined Arms Services Staff School, Infantry Officer Basic, and Advanced Courses. His civilian education includes a Bachelor of Arts degree from the University of Nevada at Las Vegas, and a master's degree in Strategic Studies from the United States Army War College.

== Awards, decorations and badges ==

Combat Infantryman Badge
Legion of Merit
Bronze Star Medal	Purple Heart	Defense Meritorious Service Medal (6 awards)
Meritorious Service Medal	Joint Service Commendation Medal	Army Commendation Medal with 1 Oak leaf cluster
Army Achievement Medal	National Defense Service Medal	Armed Forces Expeditionary Medal
Afghanistan Campaign Medal with 2 Service stars	Global War on Terrorism Expeditionary Medal	Global War on Terrorism Service Medal
Armed Forces Reserve Medal	Multinational Force and Observers Medal	Army Service Ribbon
Special Forces Tab		Master Parachutist Badge
Joint Meritorious Unit Award		Army Superior Unit Award
