= Peter Fox (sailor) =

New Zealand sailor

Personal information
- Nationality: New Zealand
- Born: 9 May 1967 (age 57); Levin, New Zealand

Sport
- Sport: Sailing

Peter James Fox (born 9 May 1967) is a New Zealand sailor. He competed in the Laser event at the 2000 Summer Olympics.
