= Real Country: Music and Language in Working-Class Culture =

2004 book by Aaron Fox

- Author: Aaron Fox
- Language: English
- Genre: Music
- Publisher: Duke University Press
- Publication date: September 15, 2004
- Publication place: United States
- ISBN: 9780822385998

Real Country: Music and Language in Working-Class Culture is a book by Columbia University musicologist Aaron Fox that was published by Duke University Press in 2004. It has been widely reviewed.
