= Neil Fox (cricketer) =

English cricketer (born 1962)

Personal information
- Full name: Neil Fox
- Born: 10 February 1962 (age 64); Norwich, Norfolk, England
- Batting: Right-handed
- Bowling: Right-arm off break

Domestic team information
- Years: Team
- 1991–2000: Norfolk

Career statistics
Competition	List A
Matches	8
Runs scored	135
Batting average	16.87
100s/50s	–/1
Top score	68
Balls bowled	54
Wickets	1
Bowling average	45.00
5 wickets in innings	–
10 wickets in match	–
Best bowling	1/45
Catches/stumpings	2/–
- Source: Cricinfo, 28 June 2011

Neil Fox (born 10 February 1962) is a former English cricketer. Fox was a right-handed batsman who bowled right-arm off break. He was born in Norwich, Norfolk.

Fox made his debut for Norfolk in the 1991 Minor Counties Championship against Hertfordshire. Fox played Minor counties cricket for Norfolk from 1991 to 2000, which included 77 Minor Counties Championship matches and 23 MCCA Knockout Trophy matches. He made his List A debut against Warwickshire in the 1993 NatWest Trophy. He made 7 further List A appearances, the last coming against Dorset in the 2000 NatWest Trophy. In his 8 List A matches, he scored 135 runs at an average of 16.87, with a high score of 68. This was his only half century in List A cricket and it came against Hampshire in the 1996 NatWest Trophy. With the ball, he took a single wicket at a cost of 45 runs.
