= Francis John Fox =

- Born: 20 September 1857; County Westmeath, Ireland
- Died: 27 February 1902 (aged 44); Napier, New Zealand
- Military career
- Allegiance: United Kingdom
- Branch: British Army
- Rank: Lieutenant Colonel
- Commands: New Zealand Permanent Militia
- Conflicts: Second Anglo-Afghan War; First Boer War
- Other work: Farmer

Francis John Fox (20 September 1857 – 27 February 1902) was a New Zealand soldier and farmer. Born in Ireland into a family with a military tradition, he was commissioned in the British Army in 1876. An artillery officer, he served in British India, the First Boer War in South Africa and in Egypt. After holding a series of staff positions, he was appointed Commandant of the New Zealand Permanent Militia in 1892. He soon came into conflict with the New Zealand Prime Minister, Richard Seddon, over implementation of a number of recommendations that had been made to improve the state of New Zealand's defences. His position changed to an advisory role which ended in 1896. Having retired from the army, he turned to farming in Canterbury. Attempts in 1899 to join New Zealand military units being raised for service in the Second Boer War were rebuffed. He died in 1902 of a haemorrhage.

== Early life ==
Francis John Fox was born in County Westmeath, Ireland on 20 September 1857, to a British Army officer and his wife. He attended the Royal Military Academy at Woolwich and then followed his father into the British Army.

== Military career ==
Fox was commissioned a lieutenant in the Royal Regiment of Artillery in February 1876. He spent most of the next ten years abroad, serving in British India from 1877 to 1880 during the Second Anglo-Afghan War. Following the outbreak of the First Boer War he was posted to South Africa in 1881. He held staff positions from 1882 to 1885 and then served in Egypt after which he was aide-de-camp to the inspector general of artillery from 1886 to 1889. He was aide-de-camp to the General Officer, Commanding, of firstly the North Western District and then the Thames District.

=== Service in New Zealand ===
Following a request by the New Zealand Government for a suitable officer to lead its defence force, the New Zealand Permanent Militia, Fox, supported by a favourable reference from a former commander, was nominated by the War Office as a suitable candidate. Promoted to lieutenant colonel for the role, he arrived in New Zealand to commence his new post as Commandant of the New Zealand Permanent Militia in May 1892. Before arriving in the country, he had taken the time to bring himself up to date with both the guns used by New Zealand's military and current developments in mine and torpedo technology.

Fox began his work by preparing a report on the state of New Zealand's Volunteer Force for the New Zealand Minister of Defence Richard Seddon. The Volunteer Force was important to New Zealand's defence, for it was to supplement the small New Zealand Militia in times of military need, but it had been criticised in the past for its organisation and its equipment. Fox took much longer than expected to complete his report, which proved highly critical of a significant portion of the officers of the Volunteer Force. He made several recommendations; these included streamlining the Volunteer Force and reducing the number of military districts from 11 to a more manageable five. He also wanted simpler firearms provided which would ease training demands. Crucially, he wanted a guarantee that his recommendations would be met and he also wanted his powers increased to include control of the Volunteer Force. His undiplomatic approach put him offside with Seddon, now the New Zealand Prime Minister, who clashed with Fox over the appropriate action to take to remedy the country's defences.

New Zealand's Defence Act did not confer the position of commandant with the wide-ranging responsibilities that were enjoyed by the appointees serving in the equivalent position elsewhere in the British Empire, a point not appreciated by Fox. He attempted to have the Defence Act amended to provide the desired scope of responsibilities but Seddon, still indignant at Fox's forthright demands for more responsibility, refused to do this. (Note: This anomaly was corrected in 1900, when the responsibilities of the Commander of the Forces (the new title of what was formerly the Commandant position) were more accurately defined and expanded.) Likewise, Seddon vetoed the possibility of Fox taking the position of Under-Secretary for Defence. This was an administrative position in the New Zealand government that had some of the powers that Fox sought.

Fox's relationship with Seddon soon deteriorated to the point where he attempted to resign in March 1894. This was refused by Seddon, who was angered when a list of grievances listed in Fox's resignation letter was subsequently leaked to the press. Seddon, already under pressure from W. R. Russell, a political opponent, was further put on the defensive when the Governor of New Zealand, Lord Glasgow, began to query the state of the country's defences. Seddon strongly suspected Fox, who was courting and would later marry Russell's daughter Cara, of agitating with both men. After some negotiation, Fox accepted a position as advisor to the government on defence matters with the title of Inspector of Volunteers and Military Advisor. Later that year Fox retired from the British Army but remained in his advisory role until November 1896. In his new role, he did implement some of the recommendations that he made in his report on the Volunteer Forces and in 1895 he reported to Seddon that he considered the country's defences much improved.

== Later life ==
After his advisory role with the government ended, Fox had intended to return to England. However, he changed his mind and decided to settle in the Canterbury Region. In late 1896, he took over a farm that he had purchased in partnership with his brother and the following year purchased another farm nearby. On these two properties he ran a herd of over 6,000 sheep. As well as his farming, he retained his rank of a colonel in the New Zealand Permanent Militia. When the Second Boer War broke out in 1899, he attempted to join the New Zealand Contingents being raised for service in South Africa but was thwarted by Seddon's refusal to grant him a suitable commission. Unhappy with his treatment, he eventually resigned from the militia.

Fox's health began to decline in 1900 and he was diagnosed with consumption. In 1901, he went to a sanatorium in New South Wales in an attempt to restore his health. Still unwell, he returned to New Zealand in September that year and settled in Napier. On 27 February 1902, he died of a haemorrhage. Buried in Napier Cemetery, he was survived by his wife and their three children.

== Notes ==
Footnotes

Citations
