= Frank S. Fox =

American academic (1861–1920)

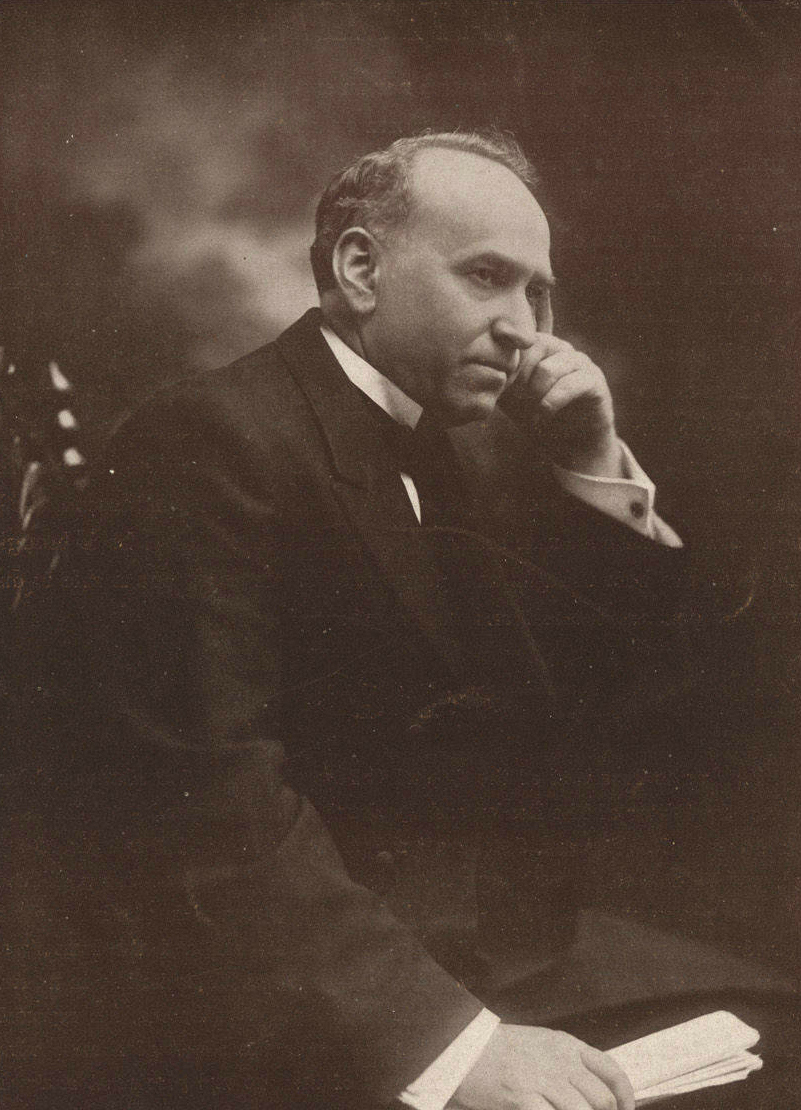
Dr. Frank S. Fox

Frank S. Fox (1861–1920) was an American academic and college president, a noted public speaker, and an educator. He was a popular lecturer who was in great demand. He founded the Capitol College of Columbus which was located in Columbus, Ohio, and later renamed Dominion University when it relocated to Westerville.

== Biography ==
Fox served as professor of Public Speaking in Wittenberg College and was widely known throughout the country as a lecturer and institute instructor. He wrote Essential Steps in Reading and Speaking. This text on public speaking is used in many high schools and colleges today in addition to many other texts he authored. Fox founded the Capitol College of Oratory and Music at Columbus, Ohio in 1896. The college was later renamed the Capitol College of Columbus and later renamed Dominion University when the university was relocated from Columbus to Westerville, Ohio. He served as president of that institution for twenty-three years. The present day Dominion University of Westerville Ohio named its journalism school, the Frank S. Fox School of Journalism, in honor of Fox. The early college had a complete school of Speech Arts under the direction of Clarence Seacrest Williams. Among the activities of the college was the Capitol Theatre, a repertoire company made up of the students in dramatic arts. In addition to his academic duties Professor Fox remained in great demand as a public speaker until a train accident in Columbus which greatly affected his health. He then moved to Ashland where his health continued to deteriorate until his death in 1920.

== Early life ==
Fox was born in Hayesville, Ohio on July 28, 1861. He was educated at Vermillion Institute, Savannah Academy and Wooster University. He taught in Ashland College, Otterbein University, The Ohio State University and in the College of Oratory and Music. Among his various degrees he held a B.S., M.A., and a Ph.D. He also taught in the Ohio public schools and was the editor of The Reader and Speaker magazine. He was married to Beatrice Armstrong and had five children.
