= John Uberti =

United States Army general

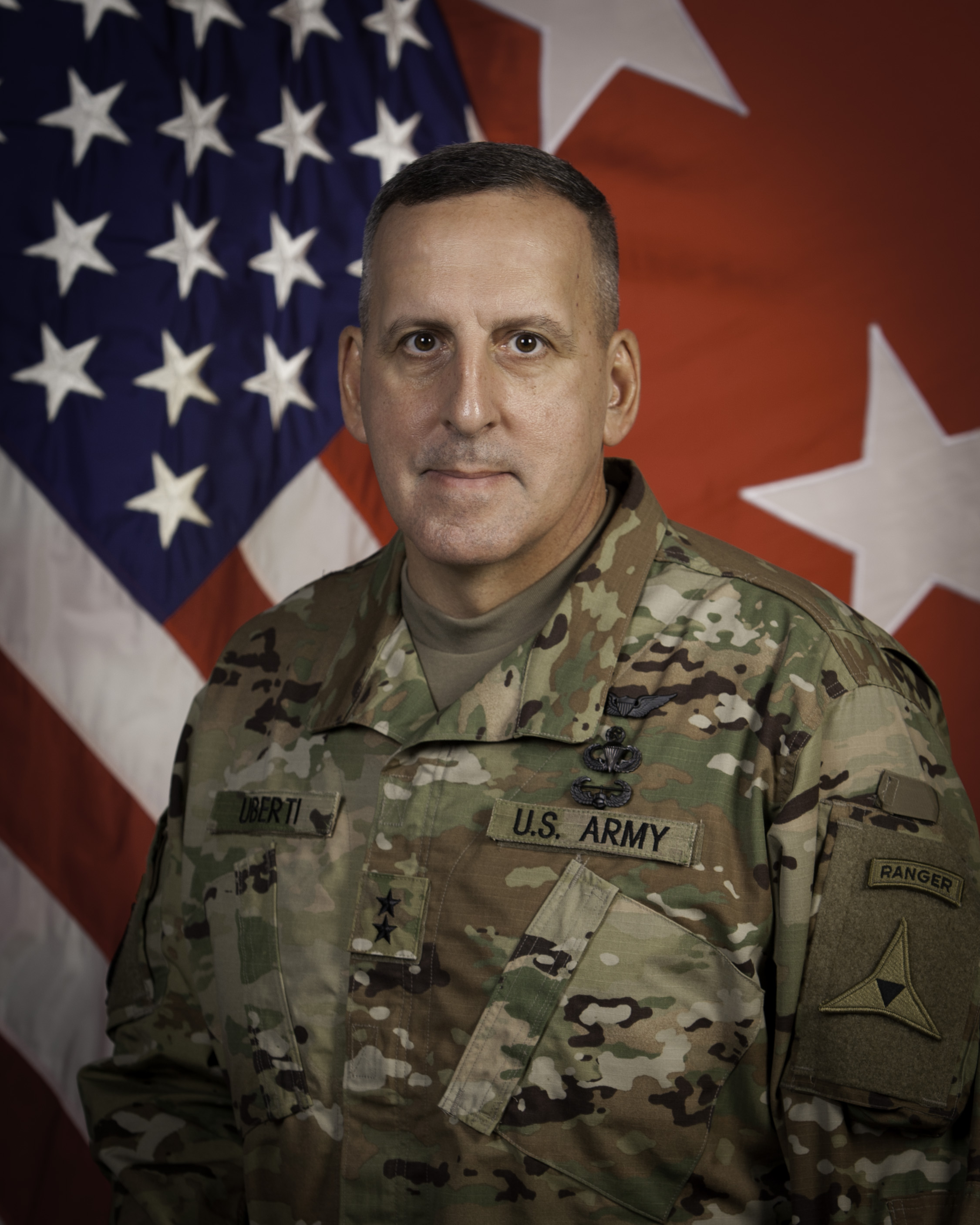
- Major General John Uberti; Deputy Commanding General for Operations, U.S. Army III Armored Corps
- Born: January 11, 1961 (age 65); Merrick, New York
- Military career
- Allegiance: United States of America
- Branch: United States Army
- Service years: 1983–2017
- Rank: Major General
- Awards: Legion of Merit; Bronze Star; Defense Meritorious Service Medal; Meritorious Service Medal; Army Commendation Medal; Joint Service Achievement Medal; Master Parachutist Badge; Ranger Tab; Air Assault Badge

Major General John Uberti (born January 11, 1961) is a retired American military officer who last served as the deputy commanding general for operations for the U.S. Army's III Armored Corps at Fort Hood, Texas.

== Military career ==
John Uberti was originally from Merrick, New York, and was commissioned in the Field Artillery corps in 1983 upon graduation from the United States Military Academy, West Point, New York.

After completing the Field Artillery Officer Basic Course, he was assigned to the 1st Battalion, 320th Field Artillery Regiment, 101st Airborne Division (Air Assault), where he served as a fire support team chief, battery fire direction officer, battery executive officer and battalion S4. From 1988 to 1989, he served with the 2nd Infantry Division in the Republic of Korea as the plans and operations officer, 6th Battalion, 37th Field Artillery, a composite 8"/MLRS battalion. After completing his tour in Korea, BG Uberti was assigned to the 82nd Airborne Division where he served as battalion maintenance officer, 2nd Battalion, 319th Airborne Field Artillery Regiment. During Operations Desert Shield and Desert Storm, he commanded Battery B, 2nd Battalion, 319th Airborne Field Artillery Regiment.

The promotion ceremony of then-Brigadier General John Uberti

Upon redeployment from Southwest Asia, he served as the battalion fire support officer, 2nd Battalion, 325th Airborne Infantry Regiment. In 1992, he was assigned to Vicenza, Italy where he served as Battalion Fire Support Officer, 3-325th Infantry (Airborne) and as the commander, Battery D, 319th Airborne Field Artillery Regiment. In June 1995, BG Uberti returned to Fort Bragg, North Carolina and was assigned to the 18th Field Artillery Brigade (Airborne). His assignments were as battalion executive officer, 1st Battalion (Airborne), 321st Field Artillery Regiment, Brigade Assistant S3 and Brigade S3. In June 1997, he was assigned to the Operations Directorate, Joint Special Operations Command, Fort Bragg, North Carolina.

John Uberti served as the commanding officer, 1st Battalion, 319th Airborne Field Artillery Regiment from June 1999 until June 2001 and served as the inspector general, 82nd Airborne Division from June 2001 until June 2002. Upon completion of the Naval War college in 2003, BG Uberti was assigned to Headquarters Department of the Army, ODCS G/3/5/7 where he served as the chief, Battle Command Division until July 2005. BG Uberti reported to Fort Sill, Oklahoma in July 2005, where he served as the commander, U.S. Army Garrison Fort Sill until July 2007, and then the chief of staff, U.S. Army Fires Center of Excellence at Fort Sill. He served as commanding general, Installation Management Command, Korea Region, from July 2008 to June 2010. He also served as deputy commanding general for support for the U.S. Army Installation Management Command.

Uberti is a graduate of the Field Artillery Officer Basic and Advanced Courses, the Army Command and General Staff college, and the Naval War college. He holds an MA degree in national security and strategic studies.

In August, 2012, Uberti was promoted to the rank of major general.

Prior to his arrival to Fort Hood, Major General Uberti was the chief of staff, United States Strategic Command, where he directed the activities of the US STRATCOM staff and served as the principal advisor to the commander and deputy commander, United States Strategic Command.

Uberti retired from active duty in December 2017.

== Awards, decorations and badges ==
His awards and decorations include the Legion of Merit, Bronze Star, Defense Meritorious Service Medal, Meritorious Service Medal with three oak leaf clusters, Army Commendation Medal with silver oak leaf cluster, Joint Service Achievement Medal, Master Parachutist Badge, Ranger Tab and Air Assault Badge.

Legion of Merit
Bronze Star
Defense Meritorious Service Medal
Meritorious Service Medal
Army Commendation Medal (with silver oak leaf cluster)
Joint Service Achievement Medal
