= Kilcoursey =

Kilcoursey (Irish: Cill Chuairsí) is a barony in County Offaly (formerly King's County), Ireland.

== Etymology ==
The name Kilcoursey is from Kilcoursey Castle (also called Lehinch Castle; near Clara), which is named for Kilcoursey townland (Irish Cill Chuairsí, "Cuairseach's church").

== Location ==
Kilcoursey barony is located in north County Offaly, south of the Gageborough River.

== History ==
The Sionnach/Ó Sionnaigh (Fox) clan were chiefs in Kilcoursey, referred to as Muinter Tadgain, which also included Clonlonan barony in Westmeath. They were kings of Tethbae (Westmeath) before they surrendered it during the Tudor conquest of Ireland.

In the early centuries of Christianity in Ireland, the family were known as Ó Catharnaigh (O'Kearney in the Anglicized form), from their chief, Tadgh O'Catharniagh, who died in 1084. Tadgh's extraordinary cunning had earned him the nickname "An Sionnach", which translated as "The Fox" in English. Subsequently, the Catharnaigh branch acquired this nickname as a distinct surname. The influence and power of the Foxes declined, due to conflict with rival Gaelic monarchs, and advancing control of English forces. However, even when their influence had diminished, they still retained considerable territory in Offaly, and became Barrons of Kilcoursey.

Kilcoursey Cill Chuairsí (Irish)
- Barony
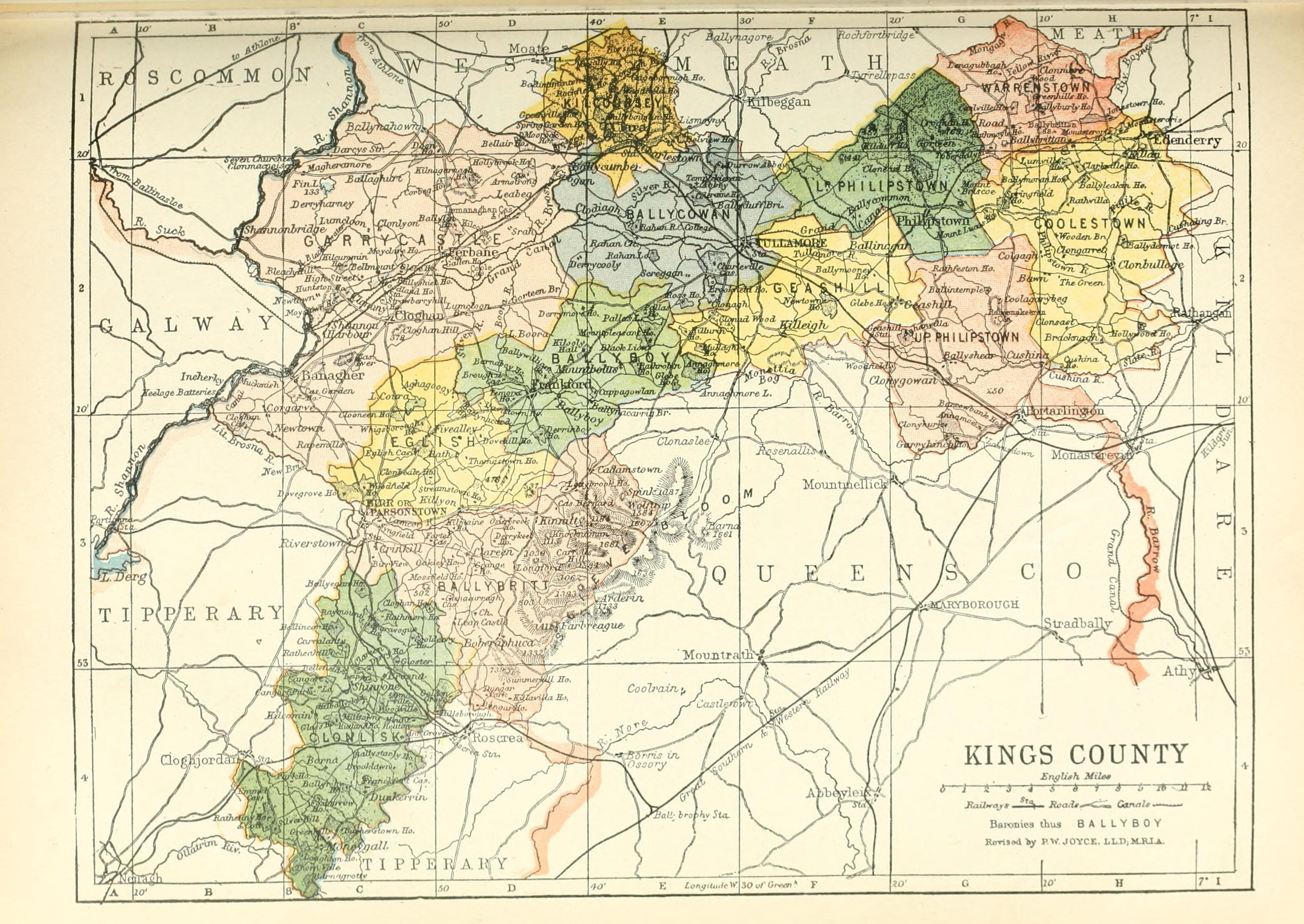
- Baronies of County Offaly. Kilcoursey is shaded orange.
- Sovereign state: Ireland
- County: Offaly

Area
  - Total: 78 km^{2} (30 sq mi)

The Mac Amhlaigh (MacAuley) sept are also cited as holding a portion of the Clonlonan barony.

== List of settlements ==
Below is a list of settlements in Kilcoursey barony:

- Clara
- Horseleap (western part)
