= 2014–15 Football Conference =

Football Conference
- Season: 2014–15

The 2014–15 Football Conference season was the eleventh season with the Football Conference consisting of three divisions and the thirty-fifth season overall. The Conference covers the top two levels of non-League football in England. The Conference Premier was the fifth highest level of the overall pyramid, while the Conference North and Conference South existed at the sixth level. The top team and the winner of the play-off of the Premier division are promoted to League Two, while the bottom four are relegated to the North or South divisions. The champions of the North and South divisions are promoted to the Premier division, alongside the play-off winners from each division. The bottom three in each of the North and South divisions are relegated to the premier divisions of the Northern Premier League, Isthmian League or Southern League.

Barnet returned to the Football League as champions after two seasons in the Conference, while playoff winners Bristol Rovers returned after a single season, their only season outside the Football League since being admitted in 1920.

== Conference Premier ==
Conference Premier
- Season: 2014–15
- Champions: Barnet
- Promoted: Barnet; Bristol Rovers
- Relegated: Alfreton Town; AFC Telford United; Dartford; Nuneaton Town
- Matches: 552
- Goals: 1,486 (2.69 per match)
- Top goalscorer: (England) John Akinde (31 goals)
- Biggest home win: Grimsby Town 7–0 Alfreton Town; Bristol Rovers 7–0 Alfreton Town
- Biggest away win: Chester 0–5 Barnet; Gateshead 1–6 Grimsby Town
- Highest scoring: Nuneaton Town 4–4 AFC Telford United; Forest Green Rovers 5–3 Southport; Chester 5–3 Nuneaton Town
- Longest winning run: 6 games Torquay United
- Longest unbeaten run: 20 games Bristol Rovers
- Longest winless run: 11 games AFC Telford United; Welling United
- Longest losing run: 8 games Welling United

=== Promotion and relegation ===
Teams promoted from 2013–14 Conference North

- AFC Telford United (League Champions)
- Altrincham (Play-off Winners)

Teams promoted from 2013–14 Conference South

- Eastleigh (League Champions)
- Dover Athletic (Play-off Winners)

Teams relegated from 2013–14 League Two

- Bristol Rovers
- Torquay United

Expelled from Conference Premier

- Hereford United
- Salisbury City

=== League table ===
Pos	Team	Pld	W	D	L	GF	GA	GD	Pts	Promotion, qualification or relegation
1	Barnet (C, P)	46	28	8	10	94	46	+48	92	Promotion to Football League Two
2	Bristol Rovers (O, P)	46	25	16	5	73	34	+39	91	Qualification for the Conference Premier play-offs
3	Grimsby Town	46	25	11	10	74	40	+34	86	Qualification for the Conference Premier play-offs
4	Eastleigh	46	24	10	12	87	61	+26	82	Qualification for the Conference Premier play-offs
5	Forest Green Rovers	46	22	16	8	80	54	+26	79 (Note: Forest Green Rovers were deducted three points for fielding an ineligible player in their win over Southport on 9 August 2014.)	Qualification for the Conference Premier play-offs
6	Macclesfield Town	46	21	15	10	60	46	+14	78	
7	Woking	46	21	13	12	77	52	+25	76	
8	Dover Athletic	46	19	11	16	69	58	+11	68	
9	FC Halifax Town	46	17	15	14	60	54	+6	66	
10	Gateshead	46	17	15	14	66	62	+4	66	
11	Wrexham	46	17	15	14	56	52	+4	66	
12	Chester	46	19	6	21	64	76	−12	63	
13	Torquay United	46	16	13	17	64	60	+4	61	
14	Braintree Town	46	18	5	23	56	57	−1	59	
15	Lincoln City	46	16	10	20	62	71	−9	58	
16	Kidderminster Harriers	46	15	12	19	51	60	−9	57	
17	Altrincham	46	16	8	22	54	73	−19	56	
18	Aldershot Town	46	14	11	21	51	61	−10	53	
19	Southport	46	13	12	21	47	72	−25	51	
20	Welling United	46	11	12	23	52	73	−21	45	
21	Alfreton Town (R)	46	12	9	25	49	90	−41	45	Relegation to National League North
22	Dartford (R)	46	8	15	23	44	74	−30	39	Relegation to National League South
23	AFC Telford United (R)	46	10	9	27	58	84	−26	36 (Note: AFC Telford United were deducted three points for fielding an ineligible player in their win over Lincoln City on 11 April 2015.)	Relegation to National League North
24	Nuneaton Town (R)	46	10	9	27	38	76	−38	36 (Note: Nuneaton Town were deducted three points for fielding an ineligible player in their win over Welling United on 28 February 2015.)	Relegation to National League North

Source: Football Conference
Rules for classification: 1) Points; 2) Goal difference; 3) Number of goals scored
(C) Champions; (O) Play-off winners; (P) Promoted; (R) Relegated

==== Play-offs ====
Semi-finals
2	Bristol Rovers	1	2	3
5	Forest Green Rovers	0	0	0
3	Grimsby Town	2	3	5
4	Eastleigh	1	0	1

Final
2	Bristol Rovers (a.e.t.)	1 (5)
3	Grimsby Town	1 (3)

==== First leg ====
29 April 2015	Forest Green Rovers	0–1	Bristol Rovers	The New Lawn, Nailsworth
19:45		Report Report 2	Taylor 17'	Attendance: 3,338; Referee: Lee Swabey

30 April 2015	Eastleigh	1–2	Grimsby Town	Ten Acres, Eastleigh
19:45	Odubade 62'	Report	Arnold 3', 72'	Attendance: 3,251; Referee: Simon Bennett

==== Second leg ====
3 May 2015	Bristol Rovers	2–0 (3–0 agg.)	Forest Green Rovers	Memorial Stadium, Bristol
12:45	Lines 24'; Taylor 88'	Report		Attendance: 10,536; Referee: Darren England

3 May 2015	Grimsby Town	3–0 (5–1 agg.)	Eastleigh	Blundell Park, Cleethorpes
15:30	Palmer 35', 71'; John-Lewis 44'	Report		Attendance: 6,286; Referee: Ben Toner

==== Final ====
17 May 2015	Bristol Rovers	1–1 (a.e.t.) (5–3 p)	Grimsby Town	Wembley Stadium, London
14:00	Harrison 29'	Report	John-Lewis 2'	Attendance: 47,029
	Penalties
	Lines (penalty scored); Taylor (penalty scored); Brown (penalty scored); Balanta (penalty scored); Mansell (penalty scored)		(penalty scored) Disley; (penalty scored) John-Lewis; (penalty missed) Pittman; (penalty scored) Clay

=== Results ===
Home \ Away	TEL	ALD	ALF	ALT	BAR	BRA	BRR	CHR	DAR	DOV	EAS	HAL	FGR	GAT	GRI	KID	LIN	MAC	NUN	SOU	TOR	WEL	WOK	WRE
AFC Telford United		0–2	0–1	2–1	2–2	1–3	0–1	1–2	2–3	1–4	3–4	0–1	0–1	0–1	1–1	1–1	1–0	2–3	0–0	3–3	4–3	1–2	1–3	1–2
Aldershot Town	1–2		2–0	3–1	1–3	1–3	2–2	0–1	1–1	3–1	0–2	1–1	1–1	1–2	2–1	0–1	1–0	0–1	1–0	1–2	2–0	2–1	0–1	1–1
Alfreton Town	3–2	2–3		1–1	1–1	0–2	0–0	1–1	0–0	2–3	3–2	0–2	2–2	1–2	0–2	2–0	0–0	1–5	1–0	4–2	4–2	2–2	1–3	2–3
Altrincham	1–2	1–0	0–1		1–3	1–0	2–1	4–1	2–1	2–2	3–3	0–0	2–2	0–1	1–1	2–1	1–2	1–0	0–1	2–0	2–1	0–4	0–3	1–4
Barnet	3–1	1–0	2–1	5–0		3–0	2–0	3–0	4–0	2–2	1–0	3–0	1–3	2–0	1–3	3–3	1–2	3–1	1–0	4–0	2–3	5–0	2–1	0–1
Braintree Town	0–2	1–1	2–1	4–2	1–1		2–0	1–3	3–0	3–0	1–5	0–0	1–2	1–0	0–1	2–0	1–3	0–1	2–0	0–2	2–0	0–1	0–0	1–0
Bristol Rovers	1–0	3–1	7–0	1–0	2–1	2–1		5–1	1–0	1–1	1–2	2–1	0–1	3–2	0–0	1–1	2–0	4–0	3–1	2–0	1–1	2–0	2–0	1–0
Chester	2–0	1–0	2–1	0–2	0–5	2–3	2–2		1–2	3–1	0–1	0–3	1–4	1–0	2–2	1–0	4–0	1–0	5–3	2–0	0–2	1–1	2–3	2–1
Dartford	2–1	1–1	0–1	1–2	0–1	0–2	2–2	2–4		2–1	2–2	1–2	1–2	1–1	1–1	1–2	0–0	1–1	3–1	1–1	0–0	2–1	1–3	1–2
Dover Athletic	1–0	3–0	1–0	2–1	0–3	1–0	1–1	2–0	6–1		2–1	0–1	0–0	1–0	0–1	0–1	1–2	0–1	5–0	2–2	2–2	4–0	2–1	2–0
Eastleigh	3–3	1–0	3–1	0–2	1–2	1–0	1–1	3–2	2–0	0–1		4–1	2–2	2–2	0–1	2–1	4–0	4–0	2–1	2–1	1–2	3–1	2–2	2–2
FC Halifax Town	5–0	1–0	2–0	1–3	1–1	1–0	2–2	0–2	0–0	3–2	0–2		1–0	2–2	1–1	2–0	3–2	2–2	2–0	3–1	0–2	3–0	1–3	2–2
Forest Green Rovers	3–0	1–3	2–0	1–1	1–2	1–1	1–1	2–1	2–1	0–0	1–1	2–0		1–1	2–1	2–3	3–3	3–1	1–0	5–3	2–1	4–1	2–1	0–1
Gateshead	4–1	1–1	2–0	1–0	0–2	3–1	0–1	2–1	1–0	1–2	2–3	2–2	2–4		1–6	2–0	3–3	2–1	1–2	1–1	3–1	1–1	0–0	3–1
Grimsby Town	1–0	3–1	7–0	0–0	3–1	1–0	0–1	3–0	3–0	1–1	2–1	1–0	2–1	2–2		0–2	1–3	1–2	0–0	0–1	0–2	2–0	3–1	0–1
Kidderminster Harriers	1–1	0–2	3–0	4–0	1–1	3–1	0–3	2–2	1–0	0–2	1–3	0–0	2–4	2–1	0–1		2–1	0–2	3–1	0–1	2–1	2–1	1–1	1–1
Lincoln City	2–0	3–0	3–2	1–2	4–1	3–2	2–3	0–1	1–0	1–0	1–2	1–1	1–2	1–1	3–2	0–0		2–0	3–1	1–0	1–3	0–2	0–2	1–1
Macclesfield Town	1–0	0–0	2–0	2–1	2–1	1–0	0–0	3–1	2–0	1–0	2–0	1–1	2–2	1–1	0–1	0–0	3–0		0–1	3–0	1–0	3–2	2–1	2–2
Nuneaton Town	4–4	1–1	0–1	2–1	0–2	0–1	0–2	3–2	1–2	3–2	0–3	1–2	1–0	0–2	0–2	0–0	2–1	1–1		2–3	0–0	1–0	1–1	2–0
Southport	0–3	1–3	0–2	2–1	0–2	0–2	0–1	0–0	2–0	2–2	1–2	1–0	0–1	0–1	2–2	1–0	3–3	1–1	0–0		2–1	1–0	2–5	0–1
Torquay United	0–1	1–1	1–1	2–0	1–2	1–5	1–2	0–1	1–1	2–0	2–0	2–1	3–3	2–2	2–3	2–1	1–0	1–1	4–0	0–0		3–0	1–0	2–1
Welling United	1–1	3–1	2–3	0–1	1–2	2–1	0–0	1–3	2–2	0–2	1–2	2–1	1–1	1–1	0–2	3–0	2–0	0–0	4–1	0–1	0–0		1–1	2–1
Woking	1–3	1–2	3–0	2–0	1–1	1–0	0–0	1–0	1–1	6–1	1–1	3–2	1–0	3–0	1–2	2–3	3–1	0–0	1–0	1–2	3–2	2–2		1–1
Wrexham	0–4	3–1	4–0	2–3	1–0	3–0	0–0	1–0	1–3	1–1	3–0	0–0	0–0	0–3	0–1	1–0	1–1	2–2	1–0	0–0	0–0	2–1	1–2	

Updated to match(es) played on 25 April 2015. Source: Football Conference
Legend: Blue = home team win; Yellow = draw; Red = away team win.

=== Stadia and locations ===
Locations of the 2014–15 Conference Premier clubs

Team	Stadium	Capacity
AFC Telford United	New Bucks Head	6,300
Aldershot Town	Recreation Ground	7,100
Alfreton Town	North Street	3,600
Altrincham	Moss Lane	6,085
Barnet	The Hive Stadium	5,100
Braintree Town	Cressing Road	4,202
Bristol Rovers	Memorial Stadium	12,011
Chester	Deva Stadium	6,000
Dartford	Princes Park	4,100
Dover Athletic	Crabble Athletic Ground	6,500
Eastleigh	Ten Acres	5,200
FC Halifax Town	The Shay	14,061
Forest Green Rovers	The New Lawn	5,147
Gateshead	Gateshead International Stadium	10,000
Grimsby Town	Blundell Park	9,546
Kidderminster Harriers	Aggborough Stadium	6,238
Lincoln City	Sincil Bank	10,120
Macclesfield Town	Moss Rose	6,355
Nuneaton Town	Liberty Way	4,314
Southport	Haig Avenue	6,008
Torquay United	Plainmoor	6,500
Welling United	Park View Road	4,000
Woking	Kingfield Stadium	6,036
Wrexham	Racecourse Ground	10,771

=== Top scorers ===
As of 18 April 2015

Rank	Player	Club	Goals
1	(England) John Akinde	Barnet	31
2	(England) Jon Parkin	Forest Green Rovers	25
3	(England) Scott Rendell	Woking	24
4	(England) James Constable	Eastleigh	18
4	(England) Tony Gray	AFC Telford United	18
4	(England) Damian Reeves	Altrincham	18
4	(England) Matty Taylor	Bristol Rovers	18
8	(England) Lenell John-Lewis	Grimsby Town	16
8	(England) Louis Moult	Wrexham	16
10	(England) Stefan Payne	Dover Athletic	15
10	(England) Brett Williams	Aldershot Town	15

== Conference North ==
Conference North
- Season: 2014–15
- Champions: Barrow
- Promoted: Guiseley
- Relegated: Colwyn Bay; Leamington; Hyde

=== Promotion and relegation ===
Teams promoted from 2013–14 Northern Premier League Premier Division

- Chorley (League Champions)
- AFC Fylde (Play-off Winners)

Teams promoted from 2013–14 Isthmian League Premier Division

- Lowestoft Town (Play-off Winners)

Teams relegated from 2013–14 Conference Premier

- Tamworth
- Hyde

=== League table ===
Pos	Team	Pld	W	D	L	GF	GA	GD	Pts	Promotion, qualification or relegation
1	Barrow (C, P)	42	26	9	7	81	43	+38	87	Promotion to National League
2	AFC Fylde	42	25	10	7	93	43	+50	85	Qualification for the Conference North play-offs
3	Boston United	42	20	12	10	75	51	+24	72	Qualification for the Conference North play-offs
4	Chorley	42	20	11	11	76	55	+21	71	Qualification for the Conference North play-offs
5	Guiseley (O, P)	42	20	10	12	68	49	+19	70	Qualification for the Conference North play-offs
6	Oxford City	42	20	9	13	81	67	+14	69	Transferred to National League South
7	Tamworth	42	19	12	11	66	57	+9	69	
8	Hednesford Town	42	17	10	15	63	50	+13	61	
9	Worcester City	42	16	12	14	54	54	0	60	
10	North Ferriby United	42	14	16	12	65	63	+2	58	
11	Stockport County	42	16	9	17	56	59	−3	57	
12	Solihull Moors	42	16	7	19	68	63	+5	55	
13	Bradford (Park Avenue)	42	14	11	17	52	66	−14	53	
14	Gloucester City	42	14	10	18	63	75	−12	52	
15	Harrogate Town	42	14	10	18	50	62	−12	52	
16	Lowestoft Town	42	12	15	15	54	66	−12	51	
17	Gainsborough Trinity	42	14	8	20	59	67	−8	50	
18	Brackley Town	42	13	8	21	39	62	−23	47	
19	Stalybridge Celtic	42	12	9	21	54	70	−16	45	
20	Colwyn Bay (R)	42	11	12	19	59	82	−23	45	Relegation to the Northern Premier League Premier Division
21	Leamington (R)	42	10	10	22	59	74	−15	40	Relegation to the Southern League Premier Division
22	Hyde (R)	42	3	12	27	49	106	−57	21	Relegation to the Northern Premier League Premier Division

Source: Football Conference
Rules for classification: 1) Points; 2) Goal difference; 3) Number of goals scored
(C) Champions; (O) Play-off winners; (P) Promoted; (R) Relegated

==== Play-offs ====
Semi-finals
2	AFC Fylde	0	1	1
5	Guiseley	1	2	3
3	Boston United	0	2	2 (4)
4	Chorley (a.e.t.)	0	2	2 (5)

Final
4	Chorley	2
5	Guiseley	3

==== First leg ====
29 April 2015	Guiseley	1–0	AFC Fylde	Nethermoor Park, Guiseley
19:45	Lawlor 33'	Report		Attendance: 1,025

29 April 2015	Chorley	0–0	Boston United	Victory Park, Chorley
19:45		Report		Attendance: 2,022

==== Second leg ====
2 May 2015	AFC Fylde	1–2 (1–3 agg.)	Guiseley	Kellamergh Park, Fylde
15:00	Allen 1'	Report	Boshell 36'; Holdsworth 57'	Attendance: 950

2 May 2015	Boston United	2–2 (a.e.t.) (2–2 agg.) (4–5 p)	Chorley	York Street, Boston
15:00	Garner 43'; Felix 49'	Report	Doyle 56'; Roscoe 90'	Attendance: 3,174
	Penalties
	Southwell (penalty scored); Mills (penalty scored); Garner (penalty missed); Jones (penalty scored); Piergianni (penalty missed); McGhee (penalty scored); Steer (penalty missed)		(penalty scored) Dean; (penalty scored) Dorney; (penalty missed) Whitham; (penalty scored) Jarvis; (penalty missed) Flynn; (penalty scored) Burns; (penalty scored) Ross

==== Final ====
9 May 2015	Chorley	2–3	Guiseley	Victory Park, Chorley
15:00	Teague 5'; Jarvis 23'	Report	Boyes 56'; Dickinson 73'; Boshell 79'	Attendance: 3,418

=== Results ===
Home \ Away	FYL	BRW	BOS	BRK	BPA	CHO	COL	GAI	GLO	GUI	HAR	HED	HYD	LEA	LOW	NFU	OXC	SOL	STL	STP	TAM	WRC
AFC Fylde		3–2	3–0	4–0	2–1	1–3	6–2	2–1	6–4	0–0	1–2	3–1	1–1	3–1	3–1	1–0	2–1	2–2	3–0	0–0	1–1	4–0
Barrow	1–2		1–0	3–1	0–0	4–0	3–1	3–1	5–0	1–0	1–1	2–1	3–1	2–1	2–0	4–1	2–2	1–3	1–0	1–0	4–1	1–0
Boston United	3–1	2–1		1–1	5–0	0–0	5–0	2–1	2–0	5–1	5–2	0–2	3–1	0–0	5–3	0–1	2–7	1–2	1–1	1–1	2–0	2–0
Brackley Town	0–2	1–0	0–1		2–1	0–1	1–1	3–2	1–0	0–3	1–0	1–0	1–0	2–1	2–3	1–1	0–5	0–1	1–0	0–1	0–0	0–0
Bradford Park Avenue	0–1	2–1	1–3	0–0		3–2	2–2	1–2	1–1	0–0	2–1	1–0	3–2	2–1	1–1	1–1	0–5	2–3	1–0	2–0	2–4	0–1
Chorley	2–2	0–0	1–2	2–1	2–1		0–0	4–1	1–2	1–0	4–0	2–0	3–2	2–2	2–2	1–0	1–1	0–0	2–0	3–0	6–0	3–3
Colwyn Bay	0–5	0–1	2–3	1–0	0–0	0–2		4–1	3–1	1–3	0–1	0–3	3–3	1–5	0–1	0–0	3–5	1–4	0–1	1–2	2–0	0–2
Gainsborough Trinity	0–0	0–2	1–1	1–2	1–0	3–4	6–3		2–2	1–2	0–1	1–0	3–3	1–0	0–0	3–0	1–2	3–1	2–1	2–0	1–1	1–2
Gloucester City	0–2	2–0	0–1	2–1	3–3	2–1	1–1	0–1		1–3	1–0	0–0	1–1	3–1	2–0	1–1	1–7	1–1	0–1	2–1	1–2	2–0
Guiseley	3–1	2–3	2–0	3–1	1–2	2–1	1–1	1–3	1–4		4–2	0–2	2–0	1–0	2–0	2–3	4–0	3–0	0–2	3–0	2–2	1–0
Harrogate Town	1–4	2–2	2–1	5–0	0–2	4–1	0–2	0–0	2–1	0–0		0–2	4–1	1–1	1–1	4–1	1–0	0–4	1–0	2–1	0–0	0–3
Hednesford Town	2–0	1–1	1–2	4–1	1–1	2–1	0–2	2–1	3–1	1–1	3–2		4–1	1–2	2–0	1–2	0–2	2–1	1–2	1–1	2–3	0–0
Hyde	1–1	4–4	1–3	1–2	1–3	3–3	2–4	1–2	2–4	0–0	1–1	0–1		2–2	5–1	1–0	0–1	1–0	2–4	1–1	2–2	0–3
Leamington	1–4	0–2	1–1	2–1	4–3	1–3	0–3	2–1	4–1	0–1	1–3	1–1	4–0		1–2	2–2	4–0	1–0	1–1	0–2	1–2	2–2
Lowestoft Town	1–0	2–3	1–1	0–1	3–2	3–1	1–1	2–0	0–3	0–0	0–0	2–2	3–0	1–1		1–2	2–1	2–0	1–1	2–2	3–2	1–1
North Ferriby United	1–1	2–2	2–0	1–1	0–0	3–4	2–4	2–1	2–2	4–4	1–0	0–2	3–0	3–1	1–2		4–3	1–3	2–0	1–1	0–0	3–0
Oxford City	1–8	0–3	0–0	2–1	1–2	0–0	3–1	2–0	2–2	4–2	1–1	0–3	2–0	3–1	2–1	1–1		1–4	1–1	2–1	1–0	0–0
Solihull Moors	0–1	3–4	1–4	1–0	4–1	3–1	0–0	2–0	0–2	0–1	0–1	1–1	3–0	2–0	3–3	2–4	2–3		1–2	2–2	0–2	1–4
Stalybridge Celtic	3–0	0–1	1–1	1–5	0–1	0–1	1–2	4–4	2–1	1–3	2–1	0–5	7–1	0–1	1–1	2–2	0–2	0–3		3–2	3–1	0–1
Stockport County	0–0	0–1	3–2	2–1	3–1	0–2	1–1	1–3	5–3	0–3	2–1	3–0	2–0	4–2	3–0	0–1	1–2	1–0	4–3		0–2	2–0
Tamworth	0–3	1–1	1–1	2–1	2–0	0–3	1–1	0–1	2–1	1–0	3–0	3–1	5–0	3–2	2–0	2–2	4–3	3–1	4–1	0–1		1–0
Worcester City	0–4	0–2	1–1	1–1	0–1	2–0	3–5	2–0	1–2	1–1	2–0	2–2	4–1	2–1	2–1	2–1	1–0	1–4	2–2	2–0	1–1	

Updated to match(es) played on 25 April 2015. Source: Football Conference
Legend: Blue = home team win; Yellow = draw; Red = away team win.

=== Stadia and locations ===
Locations of the 2014–15 Conference North clubs

Team	Stadium	Capacity
AFC Fylde	Kellamergh Park	3,180
Barrow	Holker Street	5,000
Boston United	York Street	6,643
Brackley Town	St. James Park	3,500
Bradford Park Avenue	Horsfall Stadium	3,500
Chorley	Victory Park	4,100
Colwyn Bay	Llanelian Road	2,500
Gainsborough Trinity	The Northolme	4,304
Gloucester City	Whaddon Road	7,066
Guiseley	Nethermoor Park	3,000
Harrogate Town	Wetherby Road	3,800
Hednesford Town	Keys Park	6,500
Hyde	Ewen Fields	4,250
Leamington	New Windmill Ground	2,300
Lowestoft Town	Crown Meadow	3,000
North Ferriby United	Grange Lane	2,700
Oxford City	Court Place Farm	2,000
Solihull Moors	Damson Park	3,050
Stalybridge Celtic	Bower Fold	6,500
Stockport County	Edgeley Park	10,841
Tamworth	The Lamb Ground	4,000
Worcester City	Aggborough Stadium	6,302

=== Top scorers ===
As of 25 April 2015

Rank	Player	Club	Goals
1	(England) Omar Bogle	Solihull Moors	29
2	(England) Dayle Southwell	Boston United	28
3	(England) Danny Rowe	AFC Fylde	26
3	(Tanzania) Adi Yussuf	Oxford City	26
5	(England) Adam Boyes	Guiseley	23
5	(England) Andy Cook	Barrow	23
7	(England) Ritchie Allen	AFC Fylde	20
7	(England) James Dean	Chorley	20
9	(Nigeria) Obi Anoruo	Colwyn Bay	18
9	(England) Tom Denton	North Ferriby United	18

== Conference South ==
Conference South
- Season: 2014–15
- Champions: Bromley
- Promoted: Boreham Wood
- Relegated: Farnborough; Staines Town

=== Promotion and relegation ===
Teams promoted from 2013–14 Isthmian League Premier Division

- Wealdstone (League Champions)

Teams promoted from 2013–14 Southern League Premier Division

- Hemel Hempstead Town (League Champions)
- St Albans City (Play-off Winners)

The division ran one club short due to the expulsion of Salisbury City.

=== League table ===
Pos	Team	Pld	W	D	L	GF	GA	GD	Pts	Promotion, qualification or relegation
1	Bromley (C, P)	40	23	8	9	79	46	+33	77	Promotion to National League
2	Boreham Wood (O, P)	40	23	6	11	79	44	+35	75	Qualification for the Conference South play-offs
3	Basingstoke Town	40	22	7	11	67	43	+24	73	Qualification for the Conference South play-offs
4	Whitehawk	40	22	6	12	62	47	+15	72	Qualification for the Conference South play-offs
5	Havant & Waterlooville	40	21	7	12	61	41	+20	70	Qualification for the Conference South play-offs
6	Gosport Borough	40	19	10	11	63	40	+23	67	
7	Concord Rangers	40	18	11	11	60	44	+16	65	
8	Ebbsfleet United	40	17	9	14	60	41	+19	60	
9	Hemel Hempstead Town	40	16	12	12	64	60	+4	60	
10	Chelmsford City	40	17	5	18	65	71	−6	56	
11	Eastbourne Borough	40	14	13	13	51	50	+1	55	
12	Wealdstone	40	14	12	14	56	56	0	54	
13	St Albans City	40	16	6	18	53	53	0	54	
14	Bath City	40	15	8	17	59	57	+2	53	
15	Sutton United	40	13	11	16	50	54	−4	50	
16	Bishop's Stortford	40	12	10	18	55	69	−14	46	
17	Weston-super-Mare	40	13	5	22	55	86	−31	44	
18	Maidenhead United	40	10	13	17	54	70	−16	43	
19	Hayes & Yeading United	40	11	9	20	39	58	−19	42	
20	Farnborough (R)	40	8	6	26	42	101	−59	30	Relegation to the Isthmian League Premier Division
21	Staines Town (R)	40	7	4	29	39	82	−43	25	Relegation to the Isthmian League Premier Division

Source: Football Conference
Rules for classification: 1) Points; 2) Goal difference; 3) Number of goals scored
(C) Champions; (O) Play-off winners; (P) Promoted; (R) Relegated

==== Play-offs ====
Semi-finals
2	Boreham Wood	2	2	4
5	Havant & Waterlooville	0	2	2
3	Basingstoke Town	1	0	1
4	Whitehawk	1	1	2

Final
2	Boreham Wood (a.e.t.)	2
4	Whitehawk	1

==== First leg ====
29 April 2015	Havant & Waterlooville	0–2	Boreham Wood	West Leigh Park, Havant
19:45			Morais 3'; Montgomery 39'	Attendance: 1,296

29 April 2015	Whitehawk	1–1	Basingstoke Town	The Enclosed Ground, Whitehawk
19:45	Robinson 50'		Flood 11'	Attendance: 629

==== Second leg ====
2 May 2015	Boreham Wood	2–2 (4–2 agg.)	Havant & Waterlooville	Meadow Park, Borehamwood
15:00	Shakes 63'; Angol 67'		Dutton 16'; Mullings 83'	Attendance: 906

2 May 2015	Basingstoke Town	0–1 (1–2 agg.)	Whitehawk	The Camrose, Basingstoke
15:00			Robinson 51'	Attendance: 1,749

==== Final ====
9 May 2015	Boreham Wood	2–1 (a.e.t.)	Whitehawk	Meadow Park, Borehamwood
15:00	Angol 67'; Morias 91'	Report	Deering 80' (pen.)	Attendance: 2,201

=== Results ===
Home \ Away	BAS	BAT	BST	BOR	BRO	CHE	CON	EAB	EBB	FAR	GOS	H&W	H&Y	HEM	MDH	SAC	STA	SUT	WEA	WSM	WHI
Basingstoke Town		3–2	0–1	2–1	1–2	1–2	0–0	1–0	1–0	3–1	1–1	0–0	2–0	0–1	3–2	0–1	2–1	2–2	2–4	2–1	1–0
Bath City	0–4		0–1	2–0	2–2	0–0	1–1	2–0	2–1	7–4	1–3	1–2	0–0	1–0	4–0	2–0	2–1	0–2	0–1	3–0	1–4
Bishop's Stortford	2–3	1–1		0–5	1–1	2–3	3–1	1–1	1–1	2–2	0–1	0–2	2–2	1–3	1–3	2–1	2–1	0–0	2–2	3–4	3–1
Boreham Wood	0–4	1–2	2–0		1–1	4–0	0–0	5–2	1–3	2–0	1–1	1–2	3–0	1–0	2–1	2–1	3–0	2–0	2–1	4–0	2–2
Bromley	0–3	1–0	3–2	2–1		0–1	1–2	2–1	1–2	5–0	0–3	2–0	1–1	0–1	4–2	1–0	0–1	2–1	1–1	3–0	4–1
Chelmsford City	1–1	2–1	4–2	3–4	1–2		0–1	3–2	1–5	6–2	0–1	0–1	1–1	4–0	1–1	2–1	1–3	1–1	0–2	3–2	2–1
Concord Rangers	2–3	3–0	3–3	1–1	1–4	2–1		1–3	1–0	7–0	0–0	3–2	0–1	0–1	2–2	3–1	1–0	0–0	4–2	2–0	3–0
Eastbourne Borough	3–0	0–1	3–0	4–1	1–4	2–0	1–0		1–1	0–0	1–0	1–3	2–1	0–2	2–2	1–0	4–2	1–0	1–1	3–1	2–2
Ebbsfleet United	1–5	0–0	4–0	1–1	0–1	0–2	2–0	0–0		3–0	0–3	1–0	1–2	2–2	1–0	4–1	3–2	3–0	0–0	0–1	3–0
Farnborough	2–1	2–7	0–1	0–3	1–2	1–3	0–3	2–1	0–3		1–4	0–5	1–0	2–2	1–1	0–1	1–1	0–1	1–4	2–3	2–0
Gosport Borough	0–0	3–1	2–0	0–1	2–1	0–1	1–1	1–1	2–2	2–1		3–1	1–0	4–0	1–1	1–2	2–1	3–2	0–0	1–1	1–2
Havant & Waterlooville	2–0	2–0	0–1	2–1	1–3	2–3	0–1	2–1	2–0	1–0	3–2		4–2	2–0	1–1	0–0	3–1	2–2	3–1	1–0	1–2
Hayes & Yeading United	0–1	2–0	2–1	0–3	1–2	2–1	3–1	0–1	0–2	2–0	2–3	0–1		2–4	1–1	0–3	0–0	1–1	2–1	1–2	0–1
Hemel Hempstead Town	4–3	0–3	0–3	0–6	1–1	3–1	1–2	0–0	1–1	4–1	2–1	1–1	1–1		1–1	3–1	5–1	1–2	1–1	1–1	0–2
Maidenhead United	0–3	1–1	1–3	0–1	4–4	2–0	1–2	0–0	0–4	0–1	1–2	0–2	2–0	0–2		1–1	2–0	2–1	1–4	6–2	0–2
St Albans City	1–1	1–0	2–1	0–2	2–2	0–2	2–0	3–0	1–0	2–3	2–1	1–0	0–1	1–1	4–1		0–0	2–4	1–3	2–0	2–3
Staines Town	0–3	1–1	1–0	2–1	0–6	3–5	0–2	0–1	0–2	1–2	2–1	1–2	2–3	0–4	1–2	2–3		0–1	1–2	0–1	1–2
Sutton United	2–1	1–3	2–2	1–3	1–2	1–0	1–1	1–1	2–1	2–0	0–1	1–0	0–1	1–2	1–2	2–1	4–2		1–1	1–2	0–2
Wealdstone	0–1	1–2	1–4	0–1	0–4	4–2	1–0	1–1	0–1	1–2	3–0	2–2	2–0	2–2	1–1	0–3	1–0	1–1		1–3	0–2
Weston-super-Mare	1–2	4–2	0–1	1–4	0–1	3–1	1–2	2–2	3–2	4–3	0–5	2–1	2–2	1–6	0–2	0–2	1–2	3–2	1–2		1–1
Whitehawk	0–1	2–1	1–0	3–0	2–1	5–1	1–1	2–0	1–0	1–1	1–0	0–0	2–0	3–1	3–4	2–1	1–2	0–2	0–1	2–1	

Updated to match(es) played on 25 April 2015. Source: Football Conference
Legend: Blue = home team win; Yellow = draw; Red = away team win.

=== Stadia and locations ===
Locations of the 2014–15 Conference South clubs (Greater London shown in more detail below)
Locations of the 2014–15 Conference South clubs (Greater London)

Team	Stadium	Capacity
Basingstoke Town	The Camrose	6,000
Bath City	Twerton Park	8,840
Bishop's Stortford	Woodside Park	4,525
Boreham Wood	Meadow Park	4,502
Bromley	Hayes Lane	6,000
Chelmsford City	Melbourne Stadium	3,019
Concord Rangers	Thames Road	1,500
Eastbourne Borough	Priory Lane	4,134
Ebbsfleet United	Stonebridge Road	5,011
Farnborough	Cherrywood Road	4,000
Gosport Borough	Privett Park	4,500
Havant & Waterlooville	West Leigh Park	5,250
Hayes & Yeading United	York Road	3,000
Hemel Hempstead Town	Vauxhall Road	3,152
Maidenhead United	York Road	3,000
St Albans City	Clarence Park	4,500
Staines Town	Wheatsheaf Park	3,009
Sutton United	Gander Green Lane	5,013
Wealdstone	The Vale	2,640
Weston-super-Mare	Woodspring Stadium	3,500
Whitehawk	The Enclosed Ground	2,000

=== Top scorers ===
As of 25 April 2015

Rank	Player	Club	Goals
1	(England) Justin Bennett	Gosport Borough	24
2	(England) Lee Angol	Boreham Wood	23
3	(England) Jordan Parkes	Hemel Hempstead Town	20
3	(England) Dave Tarpey	Maidenhead United	20
5	(England) Danny Mills	Whitehawk	18
5	(England) David Pratt	Bath City	18
7	(England) Jake Robinson	Whitehawk	17
8	(England) Moses Ademola	Bromley	15
8	(England) Michael Cheek	Chelmsford City	15
8	(England) Scott Donnelly	Havant & Waterlooville	15
8	(Scotland) Matt Paterson	Gosport Borough	15
