= John Taylor (rugby league) =

British rugby league footballer

Personal information
- Born: c. 1939
- Died: 13 January 2024 (aged 84)

Playing information
- Position: Loose forward
Club
| Years | Team | Pld | T | G | FG | P |
|---|---|---|---|---|---|---|
| 1959–65 | Hull Kingston Rovers | 197 | 48 | 1 | 0 | 146 |
| 1965–67 | Castleford | 64 | 8 | 1 | 0 | 24 |
| 1967–69 | Hull Kingston Rovers |
| 1969–≥69 | York |
| | Total | 261 | 56 | 2 | 0 | 170 |
Representative
| Years | Team | Pld | T | G | FG | P |
| 1964–65 | Yorkshire | 3 | 0 | 0 | 0 | 0 |
| 1961–62 | Great Britain | 0 | 0 | 0 | 0 | 0 |

John Taylor (c. 1939 – 13 January 2024) was a British professional rugby league footballer who played in the 1950s and 1960s. He played at representative level for Great Britain (non-Test matches) and Yorkshire, and at club level for Hull Kingston Rovers (two spells), Castleford and York, as a loose forward.

== Playing career ==
=== International honours ===
John Taylor was selected for Great Britain while at Hull Kingston Rovers for the 1962 Great Britain Lions tour of Australia and New Zealand, becoming Hull Kingston Rovers' first Australasian tourist.

=== County honours ===
While at Castleford, John Taylor played loose forward in Yorkshire's 15–9 victory over New Zealand at Wheldon Road, Castleford on Monday 20 September 1965.

=== County League appearances ===
John Taylor played in Castleford's victory in the Yorkshire League during the 1964–65 season.

=== County Cup Final appearances ===
John Taylor played at second-row in Hull Kingston Rovers' 2–12 defeat by Hunslet in the 1962 Yorkshire Cup Final during the 1962–63 season at Headingley, Leeds on Saturday 27 October 1962.

=== BBC2 Floodlit Trophy Final appearances ===
John Taylor played at second-row in Castleford's 4–0 victory over St. Helens in the 1965 BBC2 Floodlit Trophy Final during the 1965–66 season at Knowsley Road, St. Helens on Tuesday 14 December 1965.

=== Club career ===
Through a one match ban, John Taylor missed Hull Kingston Rovers 5–13 defeat by Widnes in the 1964 Challenge Cup Final during the 1963–64 season at Wembley Stadium, London on Saturday 9 May 1964, he left Hull Kingston Rovers for Castleford in 1965 for a transfer fee of £6,000 (based on increases in average earnings, this would be approximately £197,500 in 2013).
