= Harry Poole (rugby league) =

Former RL coach & GB international rugby league footballer

Personal information
- Full name: Harry Poole
- Born: 23 March 1935 Castleford, England
- Died: 26 March 1977 (aged 42) Pontefract, England

Playing information
- Position: Second-row, Loose forward
Club
Years	Team	Pld	T	G	FG	P
1956–61	Hunslet	136	36	10	0	128
1961–65	Hull Kingston Rovers	123	27	0	0	81
1965–67	Leeds	57	8	0	0	24
	Total	316	71	10	0	233
Representative
Years	Team	Pld	T	G	FG	P
1958–66	Yorkshire	10	1	0	0	3
1964–66	Great Britain	3	0	0	0	0

Coaching information
Club
Years	Team	Gms	W	D	L	W%
1969–71	Hunslet
1971–72	Castleford	47	26	3	18	55
1975–77	Hull Kingston Rovers
	Total	47	26	3	18	55

Harry Poole (23 March 1935 – 26 March 1977) was an English professional rugby league footballer who played in the 1950s and 1960s, and coached in the 1970s. He played at representative level for Great Britain, and at club level for Lock Lane ARLFC (in Castleford), Hunslet and Hull Kingston Rovers (captain), as a second-row, or loose forward, and coached at club level for Hunslet, Castleford and Hull Kingston Rovers.

== Background ==
Harry Poole was born in Castleford, West Riding of Yorkshire, England, and he died aged 42 of a myocardial infarction (heart attack) in Pontefract, West Yorkshire, England.

== Playing career ==
=== Club career ===
Poole played loose forward, and was captain in Hull Kingston Rovers' 2-12 defeat by Hunslet in the 1962–63 Yorkshire Cup Final during the 1962–63 season at Headingley, Leeds on Saturday 27 October 1962. This was before substitutes were allowed, and Rovers finished up with 9 men after 4 players were injured.

Poole played, and was captain in Hull Kingston Rovers' 13-10 victory over Huddersfield in the Eastern Division Championship final during the 1962–63 season at Headingley, Leeds on Saturday 10 November 1962.

Poole played loose forward, and was captain in Hull Kingston Rovers' 5-13 defeat by Widnes in the 1963–64 Challenge Cup Final during the 1963–64 season at Wembley Stadium, London on Saturday 9 May 1964, in front of a crowd of 84,488.

=== International honours ===
Poole won caps for Great Britain while at Hull Kingston Rovers in 1964 against France, and in 1966 against New Zealand (2 matches).

== Coaching career ==
Poole was the coach in Castleford's 7-11 defeat by Hull Kingston Rovers in the 1971–72 Yorkshire Cup Final during the 1971–72 season at Belle Vue, Wakefield on Saturday 21 August 1971.

Poole was the coach of Hunslet from 1969 to 1971, he was the coach of Castleford, his first game in charge was on 6 January 1971, and his last game in charge was on 30 April 1972, and he was the coach of Hull Kingston Rovers until his death on 26 March 1977.
