= Ethan Roberts (rugby league) =

Australian rugby league footballer (born 2005)

Personal information
- Born: 4 January 2005 (age 21) Earlwood, New South Wales, Australia
- Height: 192 cm (6 ft 4 in)
- Weight: 106 kg (16 st 10 lb)

Playing information
- Position: Second-row
Club
| Years | Team | Pld | T | G | FG | P |
|---|---|---|---|---|---|---|
| 2026– | Wests Tigers | 5 | 1 | 0 | 0 | 4 |
- Source: RLP

Ethan Roberts (born 4 January 2005) is an Australian rugby league footballer for the Wests Tigers in the National Rugby League (NRL).

Roberts was born in Sydney and is a great nephew of former Rabbitohs player Paul Roberts.

A second-rower, Roberts played for the Paddington Colts as a junior and was originally attached to the Sydney Roosters, a club his father had appeared for in the lower grades. After winning the Roosters' "Harold Matthews Cup Player of the Year" for 2022, Roberts moved up the grades to make his NSW Cup debut in 2025. He was a 2025 Indigenous All-Stars representative player.

Roberts moved to the Wests Tigers in 2026 on a two-year deal which would include him in the following year's Top 30 squad. He gained experience in the second-row with the Western Suburbs Magpies in the NSW Cup during his first season and made five first-grade appearances in the NRL.
