= Brian Gabbitas =

GB international rugby league footballer

Personal information
- Full name: Brian Lawrence Gabbitas
- Born: 24 April 1935 (age 90)

Playing information
- Position: Stand-off
Club
Years	Team	Pld	T	G	FG	P
1952–65	Hunslet	343	67	0		201
Representative
Years	Team	Pld	T	G	FG	P
1958	English League XIII	2	0	0	0	0
1959	Great Britain	1	0	0	0	0

Brian Lawrence Gabbitas (born 24 April 1935) is an English former professional rugby league footballer who played in the 1950s and 1960s. He played at representative level for Great Britain, and English League XIII, and at club level for Hunslet, as a stand-off.

== Playing career ==
=== Hunslet ===
Gabbitas made his début for Hunslet on Boxing Day 1952. He went on to make 343 appearances for the club before announcing his retirement in December 1965.

Gabbitas played Stand-off in Hunslet's 12-2 victory over Hull Kingston Rovers in the 1962 Yorkshire Cup Final during the 1962–63 season at Headingley, Leeds on Saturday 27 October 1962.

Gabbitas played Stand-off in Hunslet's 16-20 defeat by Wigan in the 1965 Challenge Cup Final during the 1964–65 season at Wembley Stadium, London on Saturday 8 May 1965, in front of a crowd of 89,016.

Wigan's Ray Ashby, and Hunslet's Brian Gabbitas, jointly won the Lance Todd Trophy for man of the match in the 1965 Challenge Cup final, it was the first time two players polled the same number of votes.

=== International honours ===
Gabbitas won a cap for Great Britain while at Hunslet in 1959 against France.

Gabbitas played stand-off for English League XIII while at Hunslet in the 8-26 defeat by France on Saturday 22 November 1958 at Knowsley Road, St. Helens.
