= 1966–67 Lancashire Cup =

English rugby league tournament

- Structure: Regional knockout championship
- Teams: 14
- Winners: Wigan
- Runners-up: Oldham

1966–67 was the fifty-fourth occasion on which the Lancashire Cup completion had been held.

Wigan won the trophy by beating Oldham by the score of 16–13

The match was played at Station Road, Swinton. The attendance was 14,193 and receipts were £3,558

== Background ==
The total number of teams entering the competition remained the same at 14.

The same fixture format was retained, and due to the number of clubs this resulted in no bye but one “blank” or “dummy” fixture in the first round, and one bye in the second round

== Competition and results ==
=== Round 1 ===
Involved 7 matches (with no bye but one “blank” fixture) and 14 clubs

| Game No | Fixture date | Home team | Score | Away team | Venue | Att | Rec | Notes | Ref |
|---|---|---|---|---|---|---|---|---|---|
| 1 | Fri 02 Sep 1966 | Widnes | 26-13 | Barrow | Naughton Park | | | | |
| 2 | Sat 03 Sep 1966 | Leigh | 4-18 | Wigan | Hilton Park | | | | |
| 3 | Sat 03 Sep 1966 | Oldham | 16-13 | Swinton | Watersheddings | | | | |
| 4 | Sat 03 Sep 1966 | Rochdale Hornets | 16-18 | St. Helens | Athletic Grounds | 3,770 | | | |
| 5 | Sat 03 Sep 1966 | Warrington | 29-12 | Liverpool City | Wilderspool | | | | |
| 6 | Sat 03 Sep 1966 | Whitehaven | 2-5 | Blackpool Borough | Recreation Ground | | | | |
| 7 | Sat 03 Sep 1966 | Workington Town | 9-17 | Salford | Derwent Park | | | | |
| 8 | | blank | | blank | | | | | |

=== Round 2 - Quarter-finals ===
Involved 3 matches (with one bye) and 7 clubs

| Game No | Fixture date | Home team | Score | Away team | Venue | Att | Rec | Notes | Ref |
|---|---|---|---|---|---|---|---|---|---|
| 1 | Wed 14 Sep 1966 | Blackpool Borough | 19-7 | Widnes | Borough Park | | | | |
| 2 | Wed 14 Sep 1966 | Wigan | 11-9 | St. Helens | Central Park | 13,141 | | | |
| 3 | Wed 15 Sep 1966 | Salford | '2-7 | Oldham | The Willows | | | | |
| 4 | | Warrington | | bye | | | | | |

=== Round 3 – Semi-finals ===
Involved 2 matches and 4 clubs

| Game No | Fixture date | Home team | Score | Away team | Venue | Att | Rec | Notes | Ref |
|---|---|---|---|---|---|---|---|---|---|
| 1 | Tue 27 Sep 1966 | Blackpool Borough | 5-15 | Oldham | Borough Park | | | | |
| 2 | Wed 28 Sep 1966 | Wigan | 16-7 | Warrington | Central Park | | | | |

=== Final ===
| Game No | Fixture date | Home team | Score | Away team | Venue | Att | Rec | Notes | Ref |
|---|---|---|---|---|---|---|---|---|---|
| | Saturday 29 October 1966 | Wigan | 16-13 | Oldham | Station Road | 14,193 | £3,558 | 1 | |

==== Teams and scorers ====
| Wigan | № | Oldham |
|---|---|---|
| | teams | |
| Ray Ashby | 1 | Stan McLeod |
| Billy Boston | 2 | Terry Dolly |
| Eric Ashton | 3 | Jim McCormack |
| Keith Holden | 4 | John Donovan |
| Trevor Lake | 5 | Trevor Simms |
| Cliff Hill | 6 | Tommy Warburton |
| Frank Parr | 7 | Thomas "Tom" /"Tommy" Canning |
| Danny Gardiner | 8 | Ken Wilson |
| Colin Clarke | 9 | Kevin Taylor |
| John Stephens | 10 | Geoff Fletcher |
| Geoff Lyon | 11 | Peter Smethurst |
| Laurie Gilfedder | 12 | Robert Irving |
| Harry Major | 13 | Mick Mooney |
| | 14 | Peter Holroyd |
| | 15 | Alan Ogden |
| 16 | score | 13 |
| 11 | HT | 4 |
| | Scorers | |
| | Tries | |
| Eric Ashton (1) | T | John Donovan (1) |
| Billy Boston (1) | T | |
| Colin Clarke (1) | T | |
| Laurie Gilfedder (1) | T | |
| | Goals | |
| Laurie Gilfedder (2) | G | Tommy Warburton (5) |
| | G | |
| | Drop Goals | |
| | DG | |
| Referee | | Peter Geraghty (York) |

Scoring - Try = three (3) points - Goal = two (2) points - Drop goal = two (2) points

=== The road to success ===
First round
Leigh | 4
Wigan | 18
Rochdale Hornets | 16
St. Helens | 18
Warrington | 29
Liverpool City | 12
blank
blank
Whitehaven | 2
Blackpool Borough | 5
Widnes | 26
Barrow | 13
Workington Town | 9
Salford | 17
Oldham | 16
Swinton | 13

Second round
Wigan | 11
St. Helens | 9
Warrington
bye
Blackpool Borough | 19
Widnes | 7
Salford | 2
Oldham | 7

Semi-finals
Wigan | 16
Warrington | 7
Blackpool Borough | 5
Oldham | 15

Final
Wigan | 16
Oldham | 13

== Notes and comments ==
1 * Station Road was the home ground of Swinton from 1929 to 1992 and at its peak was one of the finest rugby league grounds in the country and it boasted a capacity of 60,000. The actual record attendance was for the Challenge Cup semi-final on 7 April 1951 when 44,621 watched Wigan beat Warrington 3-2

== See also ==
- 1966–67 Northern Rugby Football League season
- Rugby league county cups
