= Jim Drake (rugby league) =

GB international rugby league footballer

Personal information
- Full name: James Gerald Drake
- Born: 20 February 1931 Workington, England
- Died: 8 October 2008 (aged 77) Hull, England

Playing information
- Height: 5 ft 10 in (1.78 m)
- Weight: 15 st 7 lb (98 kg)
- Position: Fullback, Prop, Second-row, Loose forward
Club
Years	Team	Pld	T	G	FG	P
1950–61	Hull F.C.	243	38	0	0	114
1961–65	Hull Kingston Rovers	78	7	0	0	21
	Total	321	45	0	0	135
Representative
Years	Team	Pld	T	G	FG	P
	Cumberland	5
1958	English League XIII	1
1960	Great Britain	1	0	0	0	0
- Relatives: Bill Drake (brother)

James "Jim" Gerald Drake (20 February 1931 – 8 October 2008) was an English professional rugby league footballer who played in the 1950s and 1960s. He played at representative for Great Britain, English League XIII and Cumberland, and at club level for Hull F.C. and Hull Kingston Rovers, as a fullback, prop, second-row, or loose forward.

== Background ==
Jim Drake was born in Workington, Cumberland, England, he was the older (by 10-minutes) twin brother of fellow rugby league footballer; Bill Drake. Jim Drake died aged 77 in Hull, East Riding of Yorkshire, England.

== Playing career ==
Through injury, Drake missed Hull F.C.'s 10-9 victory over Halifax in the Championship Final during the 1955–56 season at Maine Road, Manchester on Saturday 12 May 1956.

Drake played at prop for English League XIII while at Hull in the 8-26 defeat by France on Saturday 22 November 1958 at Knowsley Road, St. Helens.

Drake played at prop in Hull F.C.'s 13-30 defeat by Wigan in the 1959 Challenge Cup Final during the 1958–59 season at Wembley Stadium, London on Saturday 9 May 1959.

Drake won a cap for Great Britain while at Hull in 1960 against France.

Drake played at prop in Hull Kingston Rovers' 2-12 defeat by Hunslet in the 1962 Yorkshire Cup Final during the 1962–63 season at Headingley, Leeds on Saturday 27 October 1962.

Drake played at prop in Hull Kingston Rovers' 13–10 victory over Huddersfield in the Eastern Division Championship Final during the 1962–63 season at Headingley, Leeds on Saturday 10 November 1962.

Drake also represented Cumberland.
