= Brian Tyson =

GB international rugby league footballer (born 1940)

Personal information
- Full name: Brian Tyson
- Born: August 1940 (age 84–85); Kingston-upon-Hull, England

Playing information
- Position: Prop
Club
Years	Team	Pld	T	G	FG	P
1959–67	Hull Kingston Rovers	231	16	0	0	48
Representative
Years	Team	Pld	T	G	FG	P
1962–65	Yorkshire	5	0	0	0	0
1963–67	Great Britain	3	0	0	0	0

Brian Tyson (born August 1940) is an English former professional rugby league footballer who played in the 1950s and 1960s. He played at representative level for Great Britain and Yorkshire, and at club level for Hull Kingston Rovers, as a prop.

== Background ==
Brian Tyson was born in Kingston-upon-Hull, England in August 1940.

== Playing career ==
=== International honours ===
Brian Tyson won caps for Great Britain while at Hull Kingston Rovers in 1963 against Australia, in 1965 against France, and in 1967 against France.

=== County honours ===
Brian Tyson won caps for Yorkshire while at Hull Kingston Rovers.

=== Eastern Division Championship Final appearances ===
Brian Tyson played left-second-row in Hull Kingston Rovers' 13–10 victory over Huddersfield in the Eastern Division Championship Final during the 1962–63 season at Headingley, Leeds on Saturday 10 November 1962.

=== Challenge Cup Final appearances ===
Brian Tyson played prop in Hull Kingston Rovers' 5-13 defeat by Widnes in the 1963–64 Challenge Cup Final during the 1963–64 season at Wembley Stadium, London on Saturday 9 May 1964, in front of a crowd of 84,488.

=== County Cup Final appearances ===
Brian Tyson played left-second-row in Hull Kingston Rovers' 2-12 defeat by Hunslet in the 1962 Yorkshire Cup Final during the 1962–63 season at Headingley, Leeds on Saturday 27 October 1962, and played right-prop in Hull Kingston Rovers' 25-12 victory over Featherstone Rovers in the 1966 Yorkshire Cup Final during the 1966–67 season at Headingley, Leeds on Saturday 15 October 1966.
