= Blackpool Greyhound Stadium =

Former greyhound racing stadium

- Location: Blackpool, Lancashire, England
- Coordinates: 53°47′03″N 3°01′57″W
- Opened: 1927
- Closed: 1964

Blackpool Greyhound Stadium was a greyhound racing track in Blackpool, Lancashire, England. It was opened in 1927 and closed in 1964. It was also the home ground of rugby league club Blackpool Borough.

== Origins and opening ==
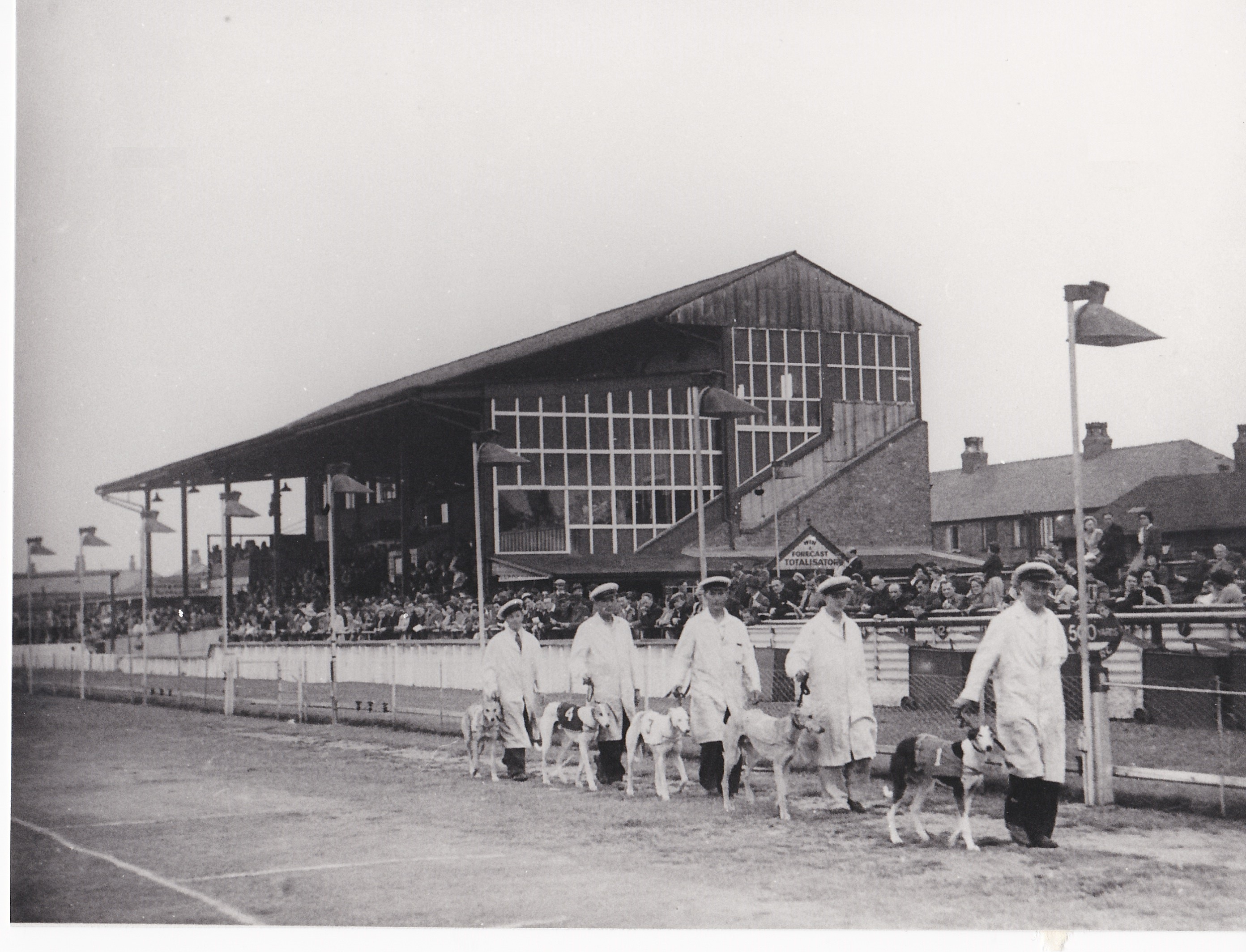
Greyhounds parading at Blackpool Greyhound Stadium c.1950

Blackpool had emerged as a holiday destination by the turn of the 20th century and between the two world wars established itself as one of the leading seaside resorts in England. The subsequent growth of the town resulted in endless forms of entertainment being created for over eight million visitors per year. Greyhound racing was introduced to Britain in 1926 and the newly formed company the British Greyhounds Sports Club (Blackpool) Ltd purchased land on the east side of St Annes Road, south of Highfield Road in order to construct a new greyhound stadium.

In addition the Blackpool Trotting Track and Highfield Road Sports Club was built by Charles Smith who had also purchased land south of the Highfield Road and it would sit next door on the northeast side of the greyhound track.

The stadium opened on the Saturday afternoon of 30 July in front of the 5,000 spectators. The six race card included one hurdle race with all races over the 500 yards distance, the first race was won by Carrow Boy at 3-1 odds in a time of 31.25 secs. The local press mistakenly advertised the meeting being at the Squires Gate racecourse instead of St Annes Road. The racing was initially held under National Greyhound Racing Club (NGRC) rules.

== History ==
The track switched to independent status (unaffiliated to a governing body) in 1929 after the company changed to the Blackpool Greyhound Racing and Sports Company Ltd. The Blackpool Borough Rugby league team played their fixtures at St Annes but Motorcycle Speedway never found its way here but did take place at the short lived Trotting Track at Highfield Road.

The Blackpool owners who also controlled Hanley Greyhound Stadium in Stoke-in-Trent branched out by taking greyhound racing to Craven Park, Barrow-in-Furness but the project only lasted the two summers of 1933 and 1934. After the war St Annes was once again licensed under the jurisdiction of the NGRC. The Director of Racing was H.H.Carver and the Racing Manager was H.S.Long.

In 1946, England footballer Stanley Matthews controversially performed his recovery from fitness at the stadium rather than at the football stadium, which upset his club Stoke City F.C.

Despite the greyhound business boom of 1946 profits dropped the following year.

== Closure and redevelopment ==
With the growing population of Blackpool, the greyhound stadium area was considered an ideal site for housing due to the fact that existing housing on Lostock Gardens already came right up to the back straight terracing and to the south on Ivy Avenue housing came right up to the back of the home straight and main stand.

Racing ended on 30 October 1964 with the site becoming housing called Stadium Avenue after it was sold to builders for £80,000.

The town was to experience greyhound racing again from 1967 until 1988 on the flapping track at Borough Park.
