= Frank Collier =

GB international rugby league footballer

Personal information
- Full name: Frank Collier
- Born: 26 April 1933 Wigan, England
- Died: 1 September 1989 (aged 56) Orrell, Greater Manchester, England

Playing information
- Position: Fullback, Prop, Second-row
Club
Years	Team	Pld	T	G	FG	P
1951–64	Wigan	323	26	27		132
1964–66	Widnes	69	5	0		15
1966–68	Salford	37
	Total	429	31	27	0	147
Representative
Years	Team	Pld	T	G	FG	P
1958–62	Lancashire	9	3	0	0	9
1963–64	Great Britain	2	0	0	0	0

Frank Collier (26 April 1933 – 1 September 1989) was an English professional rugby league footballer who played in the 1950s and 1960s. He played at representative level for Great Britain, and at club level for Wigan, Widnes and Salford, as a fullback, prop and second-row.

== Background ==
Frank Collier was born in Wigan, Lancashire, England, and he died aged 56.

== Playing career ==
=== International honours ===
Frank Collier won caps for Great Britain while at Wigan in 1963 against Australia, and while at Widnes in 1964 against France.

=== Championship final appearances ===
Frank Collier played right-prop in Wigan's 27–3 victory over Wakefield Trinity in the Championship Final during the 1959–60 season at Odsal Stadium, Bradford on Saturday 21 May 1960.

=== County League appearances ===
Frank Collier played in Wigan's victories in the Lancashire League during the 1958–59 season and 1961–62 season.

=== Challenge Cup Final appearances ===
Frank Collier played right-second-row in Wigan's 13–9 victory over Workington Town in the 1957–58 Challenge Cup Final during the 1957–58 season at Wembley Stadium, London on Saturday 10 May 1958, in front of a crowd of 66,109, played in the 10–25 defeat by Wakefield Trinity in the 1962–63 Challenge Cup Final during the 1962–63 season at Wembley Stadium, London on Saturday 11 May 1963, in front of a crowd of 84,492, and played right-prop and was man of the match winning the Lance Todd Trophy, in Widnes' 13–5 victory over Hull Kingston Rovers in the 1963–64 Challenge Cup Final during the 1963–64 season at Wembley Stadium, London on Saturday 9 May 1964, in front of a crowd of 84,488.

=== County Cup Final appearances ===
Frank Collier played loose forward in Wigan's 8–16 defeat by St. Helens in the 1953 Lancashire Cup final during the 1953–54 season at Station Road, Swinton on Saturday 24 October 1953.
