= Fred Ward (rugby league) =

English RL coach and former rugby league footballer

Personal information
- Full name: John Frederick Ward
- Born: second 1/4 1932 Leeds North district, England
- Died: 13 November 2012 (aged 80) Castleford, England

Playing information
- Position: Loose forward
Club
Years	Team	Pld	T	G	FG	P
1952–57	Castleford	152	37	0	0	111
1957–59	Leeds	58	8	0	0	24
	Keighley
	York
1962–67	Hunslet	126	20	0	0	60
	Total	336	65	0	0	195
Representative
Years	Team	Pld	T	G	FG	P
1959–63	Yorkshire	6	2	0	0	6

Coaching information
Club
Years	Team	Gms	W	D	L	W%
1962–67	Hunslet

John Frederick "Fred" Ward (birth registered second 1/4 1932 – 13 November 2012) was an English professional rugby league footballer who played in the 1950s and 1960s, and coached in the 1960s. He played at representative level for Yorkshire, and at club level for Castleford, Leeds, York, Keighley and Hunslet, and coached at club level for Hunslet.

== Background ==
Fred Ward's birth was registered in Leeds North district, West Riding of Yorkshire, England, he worked at Glasshoughton colliery, he died aged 80 in Castleford, West Yorkshire, his funeral service took place at All Saints Church, Hightown, Lumley Street, Castleford, at 10am on Wednesday 28 November 2012, followed by a committal at Pontefract Crematorium, Wakefield Road, Pontefract.

== Playing career ==
=== Club career ===
Ward played, and was coach and captain in Hunslet's victory in the Championship Second Division during the 1962–63 season.

Ward played loose forward, and was coach and captain in Hunslet's 16–20 defeat by Wigan in the 1965 Challenge Cup Final during the 1964–65 season at Wembley Stadium, London on Saturday 8 May 1965, in front of a crowd of 89,016.

Ward played loose forward, and was coach and captain in Hunslet's 12–2 victory over Hull Kingston Rovers in the 1962 Yorkshire Cup Final during the 1962–63 season at Headingley, Leeds on Saturday 27 October 1962, and played loose forward, and was coach and captain in the 8–17 defeat by Bradford Northern in the 1965 Yorkshire Cup Final during the 1965–66 season at Headingley, Leeds on Saturday 16 October 1965.

=== County honours ===
Ward won cap(s) for Yorkshire while at Hunslet.

== Personal life ==
Ward was the uncle of the rugby league footballer and coach; Paul Anderson.
