= Bernard Prior =

GB international rugby league footballer

Personal information
- Full name: Bernard Prior
- Born: 12 May 1934 Leeds, England
- Died: 17 June 2012 (aged 78) Oulton, West Yorkshire, England

Playing information
- Height: 5 ft 8.5 in (174 cm)
- Weight: 12 st 3 lb (78 kg)
- Position: Hooker
Club
Years	Team	Pld	T	G	FG	P
1952–61	Leeds	158	25	0	0	75
1961–66	Hunslet	148	9	0	0	27
1966–≥67	Wakefield Trinity	27
	Total	333	34	0	0	102
Representative
Years	Team	Pld	T	G	FG	P
1959	Yorkshire	1	0	0	0	0
1966	Great Britain	1	0	0	0	0

Bernard Prior (12 May 1934 – 17 June 2012) was an English professional rugby league footballer who played in the 1950s and 1960s, and coached in the 1960s and 1970s. He played at representative level for Great Britain and Yorkshire, and at club level for Leeds, Hunslet and Wakefield Trinity, as a hooker, and coached at club level for Bison ARLFC (Bison in Stourton, Leeds).

== Background ==
Bernard Prior was born in Leeds, West Riding of Yorkshire, England, he was a pupil at Hunslet St Joseph's, and was selected for Hunslet Schools' R.L. and Yorkshire County, he worked as an electrician, he ran a newsagent's shop on Parnaby Road, Hunslet, and he died in Oulton, West Yorkshire.

== Playing career ==
=== Leeds ===
Prior played hooker in Leeds' 9-7 victory over Barrow in the 1957 Challenge Cup Final during the 1956–57 season at Wembley Stadium, London on Saturday 11 May 1957, in front of a crowd of 76,318.

Prior played hooker, and scored a try in Leeds' 18-13 victory over Australia in the 1956–57 Kangaroo tour of Great Britain and France match at Headingley during October 1956.

=== Hunslet ===
Prior was transferred from Leeds to Hunslet during January 1961 as part of the world record transfer fee of £13,250 for Brian Shaw (based on increases in average earnings, this would be approximately £583,000 in 2013). The deal that took Brian Shaw from Hunslet to Leeds in a cash plus player deal, that included Bernard Prior and another Leeds player; Norman Burton.

Prior played hooker in Hunslet's 12-2 victory over Hull Kingston Rovers in the 1962 Yorkshire Cup Final during the 1962–63 season at Headingley, Leeds on Saturday 27 October 1962, and played hooker in the 8-17 defeat by Bradford Northern in the 1965 Yorkshire Cup Final during the 1965–66 season at Headingley, Leeds on Saturday 16 October 1965.

He played hooker in Hunslet's 16-20 defeat by Wigan in the 1965 Challenge Cup Final during the 1964–65 season at Wembley Stadium, London on Saturday 8 May 1965, in front of a crowd of 89,016.

=== Wakefield Trinity ===
Prior played hooker in Wakefield Trinity's 21-9 victory over St. Helens in the Championship Final replay during the 1966–67 season at Station Road, Swinton on Wednesday 10 May 1967.

=== Representative honours ===
Bernard Prior won a cap for Great Britain while at Hunslet in 1966 against France.

Prior represented Yorkshire while at Leeds against Cumberland at Hull in September 1959.
