= 1962–63 Yorkshire Cup =

- Structure: Regional knockout championship
- Teams: 16
- Winners: Hunslet
- Runners-up: Hull Kingston Rovers

The 1962–63 Yorkshire Cup was the fifty-fifth occasion on which the Yorkshire Cup competition had been held. Hunslet won the trophy by beating Hull Kingston Rovers by the score of 12–2. The match was played at Headingley, Leeds, now in West Yorkshire. The attendance was 22,742 and receipts were £4,514 It is the last time for twenty-two years that the attendance at a Yorkshire Cup final would again exceed 20,000

== Background ==
This season there were no junior/amateur clubs taking part, no new entrants and no "leavers" and so the total of entries remained the same at sixteen. This in turn resulted in no byes in the first round.

== Competition and results ==
=== Round 1 ===
Involved 8 matches (with no byes) and 16 clubs

Game No	Fixture date	Home team	Score	Away team	Venue	Att	Rec	Notes	Ref
1	Fri 7 Sep 1962	Castleford	28–2	Batley	Wheldon Road				
2	Fri 7 Sep 1962	Hull F.C.	12–3	Huddersfield	Boulevard	9,000			
3	Sat 8 Sep 1962	Bradford Northern	5–11	Bramley	Odsal				
4	Sat 8 Sep 1962	Featherstone Rovers	25–10	Doncaster	Post Office Road				
5	Sat 8 Sep 1962	Halifax	22–7	Dewsbury	Thrum Hall				
6	Sat 8 Sep 1962	Hull Kingston Rovers	45–10	Keighley	Craven Park (1)				
7	Sat 8 Sep 1962	Hunslet	34–9	Wakefield Trinity	Parkside				
8	Sat 8 Sep 1962	Leeds	12–12	York	Headingley				

=== Round 1 - replays ===
Involved 1 match and 2 clubs

Game No	Fixture date	Home team	Score	Away team	Venue	Att	Rec	Notes	Ref
R	Wed 12 Sep 1962	York	7–6	Leeds	Clarence Street				

=== Round 2 - Quarter-finals ===
Involved 4 matches and 8 clubs

Game No	Fixture date	Home team	Score	Away team	Venue	Att	Rec	Notes	Ref
1	Mon 17 Sep 1962	Featherstone Rovers	21–10	Bramley	Post Office Road				
2	Mon 17 Sep 1962	Hull Kingston Rovers	28–12	Castleford	Craven Park (1)				
3	Mon 17 Sep 1962	Hunslet	18–7	Hull F.C.	Parkside				
4	Wed 19 Sep 1962	York	2–12	Halifax	Clarence Street				

=== Round 3 – Semi-finals ===
Involved 2 matches and 4 clubs

Game No	Fixture date	Home team	Score	Away team	Venue	Att	Rec	Notes	Ref
1	Mon 1 Oct 1962	Halifax	6–7	Hunslet	Thrum Hall				
2	Mon 1 Oct 1962	Hull Kingston Rovers	22–6	Featherstone Rovers	Craven Park (1)				

=== Final ===
Game No	Fixture date	Home team	Score	Away team	Venue	Att	Rec	Notes	Ref
	Saturday 27 October 1962	Hunslet	12–2	Hull Kingston Rovers	Headingley	22,742	£4,514	(Note: Headingley, Leeds, is the home ground of Leeds RLFC with a capacity of 21,000. The record attendance was 40,175 for a league match between Leeds and Bradford Northern on 21 May 1947.)	

==== Teams and scorers ====
Hunslet	№	Hull Kingston Rovers
	teams	
William "Billy" Langton	1	Cyril Kellett
Barry Lee	2	Graham Paul
Geoff Shelton	3	Terry Major
Alan Preece	4	Mike Blackmore
Arthur Render	5	Robert Harris
Brian Gabbitas	6	Dave Elliott
Jeff Stevenson	7	Brian Hatch
Dennis Hartley	8	Ken Grice
Bernard Prior	9	Alan Lockwood
Ken Eyre	10	Jim Drake
William "Billy" Baldwinson	11	Brian Tyson
Cliff Lambert	12	John Taylor
Fred Ward	13	Harry Poole (c)
Fred Ward	Coach	Colin Hutton
12	score	2
5	HT	0
	Scorers	
	Tries	
Geoff Shelton (1)	T	
Billy Baldwinson (1)	T	
	Goals	
Billy Langton (2)	G	Cyril Kellett (1)
Dennis Hartley (1)	G	
	Drop Goals	
	DG	
Referee		Ron Gelder (Wilmslow)

Scoring - Try = three (3) points - Goal = two (2) points - Drop goal = two (2) points

=== The road to success ===
First round
Leeds	12 (6)
York	12 (7)
Halifax	22
Dewsbury	7
Hunslet	34
Wakefield Trinity	9
Hull F.C.	12
Huddersfield	3
Hull Kingston Rovers	45
Keighley	10
Castleford	28
Batley	2
Featherstone Rovers	25
Doncaster	10
Bradford Northern	5
Bramley	11

Second round
York	2
Halifax	12
Hunslet	18
Hull F.C.	7
Hull Kingston Rovers	28
Castleford	12
Featherstone Rovers	21
Bramley	10

Semi-finals
Halifax	6
Hunslet	7
Hull Kingston Rovers	22
Featherstone Rovers	6

Final
Hunslet	12
Hull Kingston Rovers	2

== See also ==
- 1962–63 Northern Rugby Football League season
- Rugby league county cups
