= Hanley Greyhound Stadium =

Greyhound racing and speedway stadium

- Interactive map of Hanley Greyhound Stadium
- Location: Hanley, Stoke-on-Trent, England
- Coordinates: 53°01′18″N 2°11′05″W

Construction
- Opened: 31 March 1928
- Closed: 18 October 1963

Hanley Greyhound Stadium was a greyhound racing and speedway stadium, located in Hanley, Stoke-on-Trent from 1928 to 1963.

== Origins ==
A syndicate including people connected with the Wigan and Blackpool tracks successfully applied for planning for a new stadium in October 1927. It was built on a 8.5 acre plot on top of an old pit known as Marl Pit (part of the Shelton Colliery).

The stadium opened on 31 March 1928, during only the second year of oval track greyhound racing in the United Kingdom. The stadium known as the Sun Street Stadium was located on the south side of Clough Street and the north side of Sun Street and was situated next door to the Dresden Works.

== Opening ==
Organised by Northern Greyhound Racers (Hanley) Ltd, greyhound racing started on 31 March 1928 and took place three times a week. The racing was independent (unaffiliated to a governing body).

The independent racing lasted for 35 years.

== Speedway ==
Speedway was an integral part of the stadium and a team known as the Hanley Potters first raced at the stadium.

== Closure ==
The final meeting took place on 18 October 1963 after being sold to a garage business. The site today is a business park.
