= Ray Glastonbury =

Wales rugby league and union footballer (1938–2026)

Personal information
- Full name: Raymond Glastonbury
- Born: 11 December 1938 Bedwellty district, Wales
- Died: 28 February 2026 (aged 87) Cardiff, Wales

Playing information

Rugby union
- Position: Wing
Club
Years	Team	Pld	T	G	FG	P
1957–1962	Cardiff RFC

Rugby league
- Position: Wing
Club
Years	Team	Pld	T	G	FG	P
1962–1968	Workington Town
Representative
Years	Team	Pld	T	G	FG	P
1963	Wales	1	1			3

Raymond Glastonbury (11 December 1938 – 28 February 2026) was a Welsh rugby union and professional rugby league footballer who played in the 1950s and 1960s. He played club-level rugby union (RU) for Cardiff RFC, as a wing, and representative-level rugby league (RL) for Wales, and at club-level for Workington Town, as a wing.

== Background ==
Ray Glastonbury was born in Bedwellty district, Wales, and he was the younger brother of the rugby union wing who played in the 1950s and 1960s for Cardiff RFC (11 matches during the 1958–59 season), Glamorgan Wanderers RFC and Pontypridd RFC; Blandford Glastonbury (birth registered first ¼ 1934 (age 91–92) in Pontypridd district, marriage to Patricia K. (née Collins) registered third ¼ 1958 in Cardiff district).

Glastonbury died on 28 February 2026 at the age of 87.

== Playing career ==
Glastonbury was the 1962–63 season's top try scorer with 41 tries. He won a cap for Wales while at Workington Town in 1963.

He scored 133 tries in 206 appearances for the club between 1962 and 1968.
