= Kevin Taylor (rugby league) =

England international rugby league footballer (1947–2020)

Personal information
- Full name: Kevin Taylor
- Born: 1 August 1947; Oldham, Lancashire, England
- Died: March 2020 (aged 72); Garden Suburb, Oldham, England

Playing information
- Position: Hooker
Club
Years	Team	Pld	T	G	FG	P
1963–77	Oldham	429	60	5	0	190
1977–80	Leigh	108	10	0	0	30
1980–81	St Helens	7	0	0	0	0
	Total	544	70	5	0	220
Representative
Years	Team	Pld	T	G	FG	P
1965	Great Britain U-24	1	0	0	0	0
1968–69	Lancashire	2	0	0	0	0
1968	England	1	1	0	0	3

Kevin Taylor (1 August 1947 – March 2020) was an English professional rugby league footballer who played in the 1960s, 1970s and 1980s. He played at representative level for England, England (Under-24s) and Lancashire, at club level for Oldham and St Helens, and Leigh, as a hooker.

== Background ==
Taylor was born in Oldham, Lancashire, England, and he died aged c. 73 in Garden Suburb, Oldham, Greater Manchester, England.

== Playing career ==
=== Oldham ===
Taylor played hooker in Oldham's 13–16 defeat by Wigan in the 1966 Lancashire Cup Final during the 1966–67 season at Station Road, Swinton on Saturday 29 October 1966, and played hooker in the 2–30 defeat by St Helens in the 1968 Lancashire Cup Final during the 1968–69 season at Central Park, Wigan on Friday 25 October 1968.

=== Representative honours ===
Taylor won a cap for England while at Oldham he played hooker and scored a try in England's 17–24 defeat by Wales at The Willows, Salford on Thursday 7 November 1968.

Taylor won a cap(s) for Lancashire while at Oldham.

== Honoured at Oldham ==
Taylor is an Oldham Hall Of Fame Inductee.
