= Victory Park (Chorley) =

Football ground in Chorley, Lancashire, England

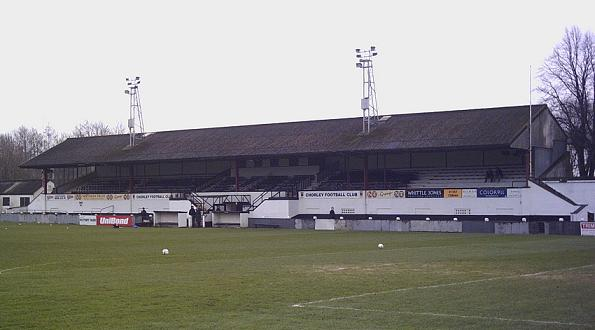
- Interactive map of Victory Park
- Full name: Victory Park
- Location: Chorley, Lancashire, England
- Coordinates: 53°38′44″N 2°37′45″W
- Capacity: 4,300 (975 seated)
- Surface: Grass

Construction
- Built: 1919
- Opened: 1920

Tenants
- Chorley F.C. Preston North End Reserves; Bolton Wanderers W.F.C. (2025–26); Chorley Borough (1988–89); Chorley Lynx (1989–96, 2001–04)

Victory Park is a football ground in Chorley, Lancashire, England. The home ground of Chorley F.C., it opened in 1920. It has hosted some big games, including their FA Cup game against Wolves in the 2020/21 season. It has one seated stand, accompanied by 3 areas for standing.

== History ==
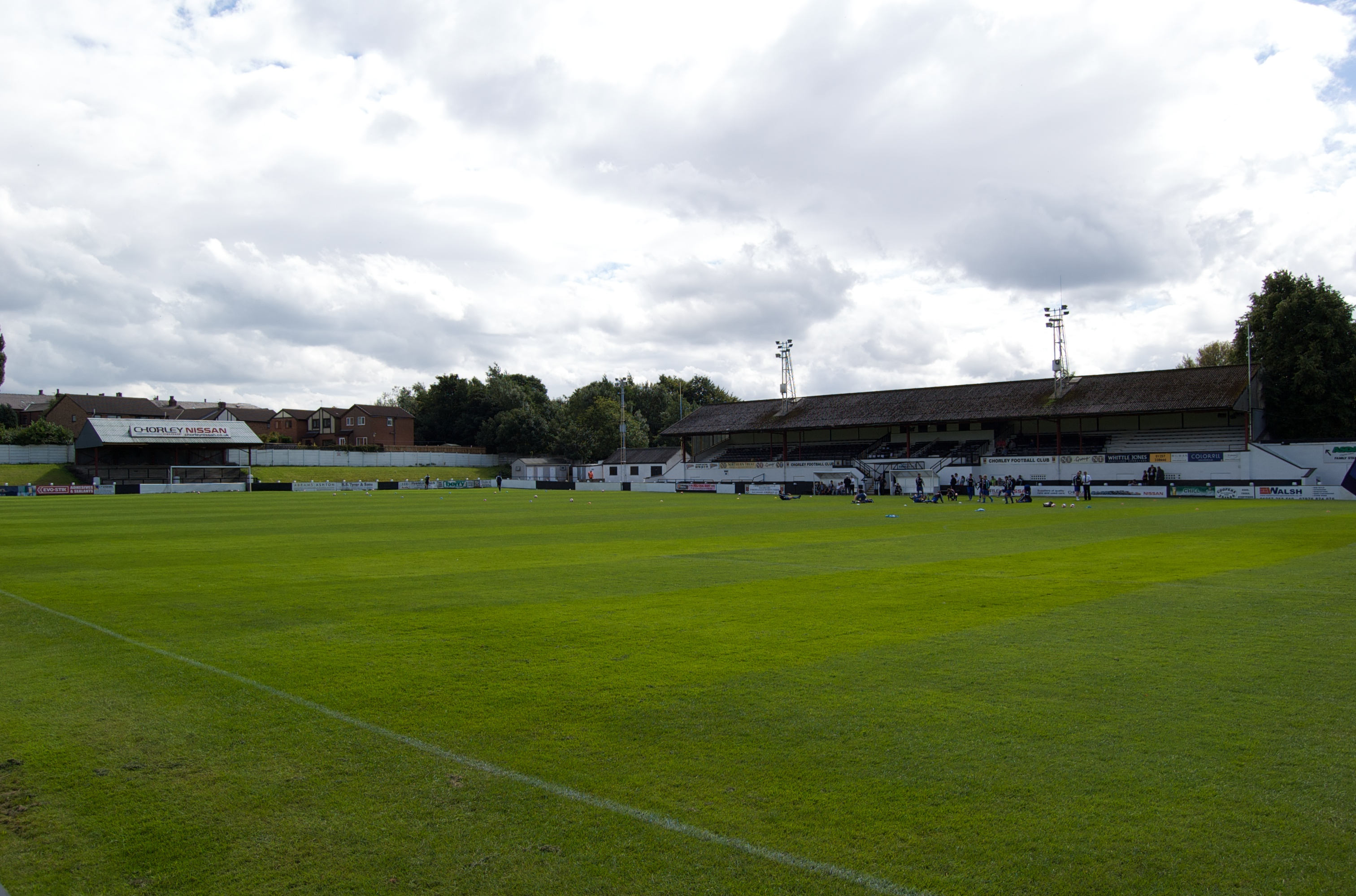
Victory Park

Chorley originally played at Dole Lane (now the Coronation recreation ground), but moved to Rangletts recreation ground in September 1901. Victory Park was built adjacent to the recreation ground in 1919 and was opened in 1920. It was named Victory Park to commemorate the end of the First World War. The original grandstand was gutted by fire on 17 November 1945, just hours after an FA Cup tie against Accrington Stanley, with a new stand being built in May 1947 at a cost of £5,500.

Chorley's record attendance for a game at Victory Park is 9,679 for a FA Cup tie against Darwen on 15 November 1932.

== Rugby league ==
Springfield Borough moved to Victory Park in 1988 and became Chorley Borough RLFC. They played there for one season before moving to Moss Lane, Altrincham and adopting the name Trafford Borough RLFC for the 1989–90 season. This caused a boardroom split leading to the creation of a new Chorley Borough rugby league club based at Victory Park. Chorley's first game was against Trafford Borough in the Lancashire Cup in front of 628 spectators. The record attendance at Victory Park was 2,851 for the visit of Oldham in January 1990.

The club went through a variety of names 'Chorley Chieftains', 'Chorley Magpies', 'Central Lancashire' (non playing period), 'Lancashire Lynx', and finally 'Chorley Lynx'. In 2004 Chorley Lynx folded due to poor attendances and the withdrawal of funding by backer Trevor Hemmings.

== 1883 Stand ==
In the 2017-18 Vanarama National League North season, Chorley started work on the '1883 Stand' that would add an extra 75 seats to Victory Park for sponsors and 1883 Lounge use only. The stand has space on either side to possibly expand in the future.
