= Lionel Emmitt =

Wales international rugby league footballer

Personal information
- Full name: Lionel Emmitt
- Born: 11 May 1930; Bridgend, Wales
- Died: 1 February 2004 (aged 73)

Playing information
- Position: Wing
Club
Years	Team	Pld	T	G	FG	P
1952–54	Oldham RLFC	36	21	0	0	63
1954–59	Blackpool Borough	168	78	0	0	234
1959–59/60	Leigh	14	7	0	0	21
	Total	218	106	0	0	318
Representative
Years	Team	Pld	T	G	FG	P
1959	Wales	1	0	0	0	0

Lionel Emmitt (11 May 1930 – 1 February 2004) was a Welsh professional rugby league footballer who played in the 1950s. He played at representative level for Wales, and at club level for Oldham RLFC, Blackpool Borough and Leigh, as a wing.

== Background ==
Lionel Emmitt's birth was registered in Bridgend district, Wales.

== International honours ==
Lionel Emmitt won a cap for Wales while at Blackpool Borough in 1959 against France.

== Personal life ==
Lionel Emmitt is the grandfather of Jacob Emmitt, who also played rugby league for Wales.
