= Keith Holden =

GB international rugby league footballer (1937–2006)

Personal information
- Full name: Charles Keith Holden
- Born: 31 July 1937 Wigan, England
- Died: 10 September 2006 (aged 69) Wigan, England

Playing information
- Height: 5 ft 10 in (1.78 m)
- Weight: 14 st 4 lb (91 kg)
- Position: Centre
Club
| Years | Team | Pld | T | G | FG | P |
|---|---|---|---|---|---|---|
| 1954–58 | Leigh | 142 | 58 | 0 | 0 | 174 |
| 1958–61 | Wigan | 87 | 36 | 0 | 0 | 108 |
| 1960–63 | Oldham | 62 | 31 | 0 | 0 | 93 |
| 1963–64 | Warrington | 49 | 22 | 0 | 0 | 66 |
| 1965–68 | Wigan | 65 | 22 | 0 | 0 | 66 |
| 1968–70 | Blackpool Borough | 29 | 2 | 0 | 0 | 6 |
| | Total | 434 | 171 | 0 | 0 | 513 |
Representative
| Years | Team | Pld | T | G | FG | P |
| 1959–64 | Lancashire | 2 | 1 | 0 | 0 | 3 |
| 1963 | Great Britain | 1 | 0 | 0 | 0 | 0 |

Charles Keith Holden (31 July 1937 – 10 September 2006) was an English professional rugby league footballer who played in the 1950s and 1960s. He played at representative level for Great Britain, and at club level for Leigh, Wigan (two spells), Oldham RLFC, Warrington and Blackpool Borough, as a centre.

== Background ==
Keith Holden was born in Wigan, Lancashire, England on 31 July 1937. He was the father of the rugby league scrum-half who played in the 1980s for Wigan and Warrington, Keith Holden Jr.

Keith Holden died in Wigan on 10 September 2006, at the age of 69.

== Playing career ==
=== Wigan ===
Holden signed for Wigan from Leigh in 1958 for a transfer fee of £6,660 (based on increases in average earnings, this would be approximately £340,000 in 2017). He played in Wigan's victory in the Lancashire League during the 1958–59 season, and also played left-centre and scored a try in Wigan's 30-13 victory over Hull F.C. in the 1959 Challenge Cup Final during the 1958–59 season at Wembley Stadium, London on Saturday 9 May 1959, in front of a crowd of 79,811 .

=== Oldham ===
After nearly two years at Wigan, Holden moved to Oldham for a transfer fee of £7,000 (based on increases in average earnings, this would be approximately £337,200 in 2017). He made 62 appearances for the club before joining Warrington.

=== Warrington ===
Holden made 49 appearances for Warrington, scoring 22 tries.

=== Return to Wigan ===
Holden returned to Wigan in 1965, he played left-centre and scored a try in the 20-16 victory over Hunslet in the 1965 Challenge Cup Final during the 1964–65 season at Wembley Stadium, London on Saturday 8 May 1965, in front of a crowd of 89,016. Holden played left-centre in Wigan's 16-13 victory over Oldham in the 1966 Lancashire Cup Final during the 1966–67 season at Station Road, Swinton, on Saturday 29 October 1966. He left Wigan in 1968 and joined Blackpool Borough.

=== International honours ===
Keith Holden won a cap for Great Britain while at Warrington in 1963 against Australia.
