= Ray Ashby =

GB international rugby league footballer

Personal information
- Full name: Raymond Ashby
- Born: St Helens, England

Playing information
- Position: Fullback, Centre
Club
Years	Team	Pld	T	G	FG	P
19??–64	Liverpool City
1964–67	Wigan	124	10	1	0	32
1968–70	Blackpool Borough	40	4	3	0	18
	Total	164	14	4	0	50
Representative
Years	Team	Pld	T	G	FG	P
1963	Lancashire	1	0	0	0	0
1964–65	Great Britain	2	0	0	0	0

Ray Ashby (birth unknown) is a former professional rugby league footballer who played in the 1960s. He played at representative level for Great Britain, and at club level for Liverpool City, Wigan, and Blackpool Borough, as a fullback, or centre.

== Playing career ==
=== Club career ===
Ashby started his professional career at Liverpool City. In March 1964, he was signed by Wigan for a fee of £3,500.

Ashby played fullback in Wigan's 20–16 victory over Hunslet in the 1965 Challenge Cup Final during the 1964–65 season at Wembley Stadium, London on Saturday 8 May 1965, in front of a crowd of 89,016. He jointly won the Lance Todd Trophy with Hunslet's Brian Gabbitas for man of the match, and was the first time two players polled the same number of votes.

He returned to Wembley with Wigan the following year in the 1966 Challenge Cup final, but this time lost 2–21 to St Helens.

During the 1966–67 season, Ashby played fullback in Wigan's 16–13 victory over Oldham in the 1966 Lancashire Cup Final at Station Road, Swinton, on Saturday 29 October 1966.

=== International honours ===
Ashby was selected to play for Great Britain against France while he was at Liverpool City in 1964, and was one of only four players in the club's history to be capped for Great Britain. He won a second cap against France while at Wigan in 1965.
