= Geoff Shelton =

GB international rugby league footballer

Personal information
- Full name: Geoffrey Shelton
- Born: third ¼ 1940; Leeds district, England
- Died: August 2012 (aged 72)

Playing information
- Position: Centre
Club
Years	Team	Pld	T	G	FG	P
1958–66	Hunslet	220	77	0		231
1966–68	Oldham	26	3	0		9
1968	Warrington	17	0	0		0
	Total	263	80	0	0	240
Representative
Years	Team	Pld	T	G	FG	P
	Yorkshire
1964–66	Great Britain	7	3	0	0	9

Geoffrey Shelton (birth registered third ¼ 1940 – August 2012) was an English professional rugby league footballer who played in the 1950s and 1960s. He played at representative level for Great Britain and Yorkshire, and at club level for Hunslet, Oldham and Warrington, as a centre.

== Background ==
Shelton's birth was registered in Leeds district, West Riding of Yorkshire, England, he was landlord of the Coach and Horses public house at 459 Huddersfield Road, Waterhead, Oldham, OL4 2HT, he died aged 72, and his funeral was held at Harrogate Crematorium, Wetherby Road, Harrogate at 1pm on Friday August 2012.

== Playing career ==
=== Club career ===
Shelton was transferred from Hunslet to Oldham in 1966 for a transfer fee of £6,250 (based on increases in average earnings, this would be approximately £244,600 in 2013), in February 1968 he was transferred from Oldham to Warrington for £2,500 (also stated as £3,000), before retiring due to injury.

Shelton played at centre, and scored a try in Hunslet's 16-20 defeat by Wigan in the 1965 Challenge Cup Final during the 1964–65 season at Wembley Stadium, London on Saturday 8 May 1965, in front of a crowd of 89,016.

Shelton played at centre, and scored a try in Hunslet's 12-2 victory over Hull Kingston Rovers in the 1962 Yorkshire Cup Final during the 1968–69 season at Headingley, Leeds on Saturday 27 October 1962, and played at centre in the 8-17 defeat by Bradford Northern in the 1965 Yorkshire Cup Final during the 1965–66 season at Headingley, Leeds on Saturday 16 October 1965.

=== Representative honours ===
Shelton won caps for Great Britain while at Hunslet in 1964 against France (2 matches), in 1965 against New Zealand (3 matches), and on the 1966 Great Britain Lions tour against Australia (2 matches).

Shelton won cap(s) for Yorkshire while at Hunslet.
