= 1964–65 Challenge Cup =

Rugby league competition

- Duration: 5 Rounds
- Number of teams: 32
- Highest attendance: 89,016
- Broadcast partners: BBC 1
- Winners: Wigan
- Runners-up: Hunslet
- Lance Todd Trophy: Ray Ashby; Brian Gabbitas (shared)

The 1964–65 Challenge Cup was the 64th staging of rugby league's oldest knockout competition, the Challenge Cup.

The final was contested by Wigan and Hunslet at Wembley Stadium. Wigan won the match 20–16, with Wigan's Ray Ashby and Hunslet's Brian Gabbitas jointly receiving the Lance Todd Trophy.

== First round ==
Date	Team one	Team two	Score
06 Feb	Crosfields	Blackpool	4-27
06 Feb	Dewsbury	Wakefield Trinity	2-11
06 Feb	Doncaster	Whitehaven	4-5
06 Feb	Featherstone Rovers	York	24-7
06 Feb	Halifax	Rochdale Hornets	17-12
06 Feb	Huddersfield	Bramley	5-20
06 Feb	Hull Kingston Rovers	Batley	5-7
06 Feb	Hunslet	Oldham	12-4
06 Feb	Keighley	Salford	8-11
06 Feb	Leeds	Liverpool	19-6
06 Feb	Leigh	Bradford Northern	6-7
06 Feb	St Helens	Castleford	22-9
06 Feb	Swinton	Dewsbury Celtic	48-5
06 Feb	Warrington	Hull FC	7-4
06 Feb	Widnes	Workington Town	2-2
06 Feb	Wigan	Barrow	16-0
10 Feb - replay	Workington Town	Widnes	2-0

== Second round ==
Date	Team one	Team two	Score
27 Feb	Blackpool	Whitehaven	5-2
27 Feb	Bradford Northern	Wakefield Trinity	7-10
27 Feb	Featherstone Rovers	Swinton	2-9
27 Feb	Hunslet	Batley	24-4
27 Feb	Leeds	Bramley	13-9
27 Feb	Warrington	Salford	16-2
27 Feb	Wigan	St Helens	7-2
27 Feb	Workington Town	Halifax	18-5

== Quarter-finals ==
Date	Team one	Team two	Score
13 Mar	Hunslet	Leeds	7-5
13 Mar	Wakefield Trinity	Blackpool	4-0
13 Mar	Warrington	Swinton	10-11
13 Mar	Workington Town	Wigan	4-10

== Semi-finals ==
Date	Team one	Team two	Score
03 Apr	Wigan	Swinton	25-10
10 Apr	Hunslet	Wakefield Trinity	8-0

== Final ==
8 May 1965

Wigan	20 – 16	Hunslet
Try: Holden, Lake (2), Gilfedder; Goal: Gilfedder (3), Ashton	Report	Try: Shelton, Griffiths; Goal: Langton (5)

Wembley Stadium, London
Attendance: 89,016
Referee: Joe Manley (Warrington)
Player of the Match: Ray Ashby & Brian Gabbitas

FB	1	Ray Ashby
RW	2	Billy Boston
RC	3	Eric Ashton (c)
LC	4	Keith Holden
LW	5	Trevor Lake
SO	6	Cliff Hill
SH	7	Frank Parr
PR	8	Danny Gardiner
HK	9	Colin Clarke
PR	10	Brian McTigue
SR	11	Tony Stephens
SR	12	Roy Evans
LF	13	Laurie Gilfedder
Substitutes (not used):
IC	14	Kevin O'Loughlin
IC	15	Geoff Lyon
Player-coach:
Eric Ashton

FB	1	Bill Langton
RW	2	John Griffiths
RC	3	Geoff Shelton
LC	4	Alan Preece
LW	5	Barry Lee
SO	6	Brian Gabbitas
SH	7	Alan Marchant
PR	8	Dennis Hartley
HK	9	Bernard Prior
PR	10	Ken Eyre
SR	11	Bill Ramsey
SR	12	Geoff Gunney
LF	13	Fred Ward (c)
Substitutes (not used):
IC	14	Arthur Render
IC	15	Billy Baldwinson
Player-coach:
Fred Ward
