= Graeme Johns =

Former Wales international rugby league footballer

Personal information
- Full name: Graeme Johns

Playing information
- Position: Fullback
Club
Years	Team	Pld	T	G	FG	P
1975–79	Swinton	63	10	102	2	236
1979–81	Salford	9	0	12	0	24
1981–82	Whitehaven	6
1982–85	Blackpool Borough	47	5	45	0	110
	Total	125	15	159	2	370
Representative
Years	Team	Pld	T	G	FG	P
1979–84	Wales	2	0	0	0	0

Graeme Johns is a former professional rugby league footballer who played in the 1970s and 1980s. He played at representative level for Wales, and at club level for Swinton, Salford and Blackpool Borough.

== Career ==
=== Club career ===
In March 1981, Johns was signed by Whitehaven for a fee of £3,500.

=== International honours ===
Graeme Johns won caps for Wales while at Salford in 1979 against France (interchange/substitute), and while at Blackpool Borough in 1984 against England (interchange/substitute).
