= George Kemel =

GB international rugby league footballer (1931–2021)

Personal information
- Full name: George Kemel
- Born: 1930 or 1931; Prescot, Merseyside, England
- Died: 14 October 2021 (aged 90)

Playing information
- Position: Hooker
Club
Years	Team	Pld	T	G	FG	P
1951–69	Widnes	463	20	9	0	78
Representative
Years	Team	Pld	T	G	FG	P
1965–66	Lancashire	4	0	0	0	0
1965	Great Britain	2	0	0	0	0

George Kemel (1931 – 14 October 2021) was an English professional rugby league footballer who played in the 1950s and 1960s. He played at representative level for Great Britain, and at club level for Widnes, as a hooker.

== Playing career ==
=== Challenge Cup Final appearances ===
George Kemel played hooker in Widnes' 13–5 victory over Hull Kingston Rovers in the 1964 Challenge Cup Final at Wembley Stadium, London on Saturday 9 May 1964, in front of a crowd of 84,488.

=== International honours ===
George Kemel won caps for Great Britain while at Widnes in 1965 against New Zealand (2 matches).
