= Danny Gardiner =

GB international rugby league footballer

Personal information
- Full name: Robert Bernard Gardiner
- Born: third ¼ 1939 Kirkby-in-Furness, England
- Died: 14 January 2015 (aged 75)

Playing information
- Position: Prop, Second-row
Club
Years	Team	Pld	T	G	FG	P
≤1965–65	Workington Town	121
1965–68	Wigan	142+7	2	0	0	6
1969–70	Oldham	24	1	0	0	3
	Total	294	3	0	0	9
Representative
Years	Team	Pld	T	G	FG	P
1964–65	Lancashire	3	0	0	0	0
1965	Great Britain	1	0	0	0	0

Robert Bernard "Danny" Gardiner (third ¼ 1939 – 14 January 2015) was an English professional rugby league footballer who played in the 1960s and 1970s. He played at representative level for Great Britain and Lancashire, and at club level for Workington Town, Wigan and Oldham, as a prop or second-row.

== Background ==
Danny Gardiner was born in Kirkby-in-Furness, Lancashire, England (birth registered in Ulverston district, Lancashire, England).

== Playing career ==
=== International honours ===
Danny Gardiner won a cap for Great Britain while at Wigan in 1965 against New Zealand.

=== Challenge Cup Final appearances ===
Danny Gardiner played left-prop in Wigan's 20-16 victory over Hunslet in the 1965 Challenge Cup Final during the 1964–65 season at Wembley Stadium, London on Saturday 8 May 1965, in front of a crowd of 89,016.

=== County Cup Final appearances ===
Danny Gardiner played left-prop in Wigan's 16-13 victory over Oldham in the 1966 Lancashire Cup Final during the 1966–67 season at Station Road, Swinton, on Saturday 29 October 1966.

== Genealogical information ==
Danny Gardiner was the older brother of the rugby league footballer who played in the 1960s for Workington Town (A-Team plus 4-matches during the 1964–65 season); John Eric Gardiner (birth registered second ¼ 1942 (age 83–84) in Ulverston district, Lancashire, England).
