= Borough Park, Blackpool =

Sports venue in Blackpool, Lancashire, England

- The opening match at the stadium in 1963. This view is looking southeast
- Interactive map of Borough Park, Blackpool
- Address: Princess Street; Blackpool; United Kingdom
- Coordinates: 53°48′30.0″N 3°02′52.6″W

Construction
- Opened: 1963
- Closed: 1997

Borough Park was a rugby league and greyhound racing stadium on Princess Street in Blackpool, Lancashire.

== Rugby league ==
In 1963 a new home was built for the Blackpool Borough rugby league team between Princess Street to the north and Rigby Road to the south next to a gas works. Rugby league was held at the stadium from 1963 until 1987.

== Greyhound racing ==
Greyhound racing arrived on 28 April 1967 with the racing being independent (not affiliated to the sports governing body the National Greyhound Racing Club). The track hosted one of the biggest independent races in the country called the Blackpool Derby and the seaside track ran every Monday, Wednesday and Friday evening with an additional fixture on Saturday evenings during summer.

The track had an 'Outside Sumner' hare system and fourteen bookmakers on course. In 1968 new American type lighting was installed at the cost of £5,000 and one year later a new totalisator was installed.

By the late 1980s race distances were 250, 593 and 765 metres on a 363 metres circumference circuit.

== Closure ==
The greyhound racing ended on 28 November 1997 following an agreement between track directors Michael and Suzanne Boyle and the Stockport developers Penrith Limited. Many of the track's trainers switched to Westhoughton Greyhound Track. The stadium was subsequently demolished by the council to make way for a cinema complex.
