= Blackpool Borough =

English rugby league club, 1954–1997

Club information
- Full name: Blackpool Borough RLFC
- Colours: Tangerine, black and white
- Founded: unknown (reformed 1982)
- Exited: 1997; 29 years ago

Former details
- Ground: The Mechanics, Blackpool, 1992–97 Moss Lane, Altrincham, 1989–92 Victory Park, Chorley, 1988–89 Springfield Park, Wigan, 1987–88 Borough Park, Blackpool, 1963–87 St Anne's Road Greyhound Stadium, until 1962

Blackpool Borough was a rugby league club based in Blackpool, Lancashire, England, that played in the Rugby Football League from 1954 until 1993. The club moved to Wigan in 1987 and was renamed Springfield Borough; to Chorley in 1988 and was renamed Chorley Borough; to Altrincham in 1989 and was renamed Trafford Borough, and finally back to Blackpool in 1992 as Blackpool Gladiators. It folded in 1997.

The team wore tangerine, black and white jerseys.

== History ==
=== Blackpool Borough ===
A Blackpool club were members of the Northern Union Lancashire Second Competition in 1898–99. The first unsuccessful application for a Blackpool team to join the Rugby League was made in December 1950. Blackpool Borough were accepted into the Rugby League for the 1954–55 season. In their early days, they were known as "the Babes". Their first ever league match was played at The Willows, Salford, 14 August 1954. They were defeated 24–13 with a young Wigan lad, Roy Thornley loose forward, scoring their first ever try in the league. The first-ever victory was over Hull Kingston Rovers at Blackpool.

Borough played at Blackpool Greyhound Stadium in St Anne's Road but larger fixtures were played at Blackpool F.C.'s Bloomfield Road stadium. Their record attendance was 12,015 on 10 September 1955 when they drew with the New Zealand tourists 24–24 at Bloomfield Road. The record attendance was set in 1957 at 22,000 for the third round Challenge Cup match against Leigh.

In the first eight years of their existence, they had never finished above 21st. Blackpool Greyhound Stadium was sold for housing and in April 1962. Blackpool Borough Council granted a 21-year lease on a new ground – Borough Park – on the former gas works and coach park site at Rigby Road and Princess Street. The first match at Borough Park was played on Saturday 31 August 1963 when Blackpool beat Salford 36–16. The record defeat came on 26 October 1963 when Wigan won 77 points to 8.

Rugby League Hall of Fame member Brian Bevan played for Blackpool Borough between 1962 and 1964 having retired from playing for Warrington. In Bevan's first year Blackpool finished fourth in the Second Division. Fellow winger and Hall of Fame member Billy Boston also ended his career at Blackpool between 1969 and 1971. Former Australian Representative Tim Pickup began his professional career with Blackpool, on loan from St. Helens. He was player of the year at Fullback for both the 1970 & 71 seasons. Pickup returned home and played for Australia as Five-eighth/Stand-off from 1972 to 1975, returning to England as part of the 1973 Kangaroo Tour and was a member of Australia's victorious 1975 World Cup Squad.

In 1978–79, Blackpool, coached by Albert Fearnley, won promotion to the First Division for the only time by finishing fourth in the Second Division. However the next season, they finished bottom and were relegated back to the Second Division.

In April 1982, Borough were put into liquidation less than nine months after being taken over by a Cardiff businessman. A new company, Savoy Sports and Leisure Ltd, then bought the club and a new Blackpool Borough RLFC was formed on 4 August 1982 and accepted into the Rugby League for the new season. The club was ordered to carry out safety measures on the ground by Lancashire County Council by 1 February 1987 or quit the ground. Blackpool failed to get a safety grant aid of £65,000 from Blackpool Borough Council and were forced to leave. The final game at Borough Park being on 4 January 1987 when a crowd of 386 saw the club lose 8–5 to Whitehaven. Their final six home games were played at Bloomfield Road.

=== Springfield Borough ===
Another consortium took over the club in April 1987 on condition that Borough left Blackpool. Their first new home was Springfield Park, the then home of Wigan Athletic. Wigan RLFC were rumoured to have objected to the proposed 'Wigan Borough' name and so 'Springfield Borough' was adopted. Springfield Borough's club colours were dark blue, tangerine and white. The club logo was the same as the crest used by Wigan Athletic F.C. at the time.

Springfield Borough beat Sheffield Eagles 11–10 in the final rugby league match at Springfield Park. Despite good performances on the field the move was not successful; the pitch was suffering from overuse and in January 1988 Wigan Athletic gave Borough six months to quit.

=== Chorley Borough ===
The club relocated to Victory Park in Chorley and played as Chorley Borough in the 1988–89 season. The club's colours initially consisted of black and white hooped jerseys, which changed later to a primarily black jersey with irregular white bands around the waist and on the sleeves. The club ended up finishing sixteenth out of twenty teams in the Second Division.

The name Chorley Borough was later used between 1989 and 1995 by a different club.

=== Trafford Borough ===
Borough then became Trafford Borough when they moved to Moss Lane, Altrincham (sharing with Altrincham F.C.) for the 1989–90 season. This, however, caused a boardroom split leading to five Blackpool-based directors resigning to form a new club initially based in Chorley.

Trafford Borough adopted the local Trafford crest also used by Trafford F.C., depicting a rampant griffin, and their club colours consisted of royal blue and red jerseys, blue shorts and white socks.

Their tenure at Altrincham was generally unsuccessful, with most home crowds averaging around the 200 mark. It was also during this period that the club achieved their highest defeat, being beat by St. Helens 104–12 on 15 September 1991.

Trafford Borough survived three seasons before returning to Blackpool as Blackpool Gladiators.

=== Blackpool Gladiators ===
Blackpool Gladiators moved to Blackpool Mechanics FC ground in September 1992. In October 1992, the chairman Alan Sherrat put the club up for sale for £50,000. Once back in Blackpool the club colours were tangerine, purple and white jerseys, black shorts and socks.

Rugby Football League chief executive Maurice Lindsay wanted to reduce the number of clubs in the lower division of the league in 1993. The three clubs finishing bottom of the Second Division would be demoted to the National Conference League. The season was a disaster which culminated in their final home game when they were beaten 90–5 by Dewsbury. Blackpool along with the other two expelled clubs, pursued legal action against the RFL decision, but to no avail. Their last game as a professional club was on 11 April 1993 when they lost again to Dewsbury 56–0.

In November 1994, the club were on the receiving end of both a world record score and world record losing margin when they lost 4–142 to Huddersfield Giants, this record stood for almost 24 years until April 2018 when York City Knights defeated West Wales Raiders by 144–0.

The following year, the club was relegated from the National Conference League Premier Division and left to join the Alliance reserve grade. After the 1997 Alliance season Blackpool Gladiators folded.

== Past coaches ==
Also see Category:Blackpool Borough coaches

- Stan Owen (1969)
- Joe Egan (1970–1972)
- Cecil Mountford (1972–1973)
- Albert Fearnley (1978–1979)
- Geoff Lyon (1980–1982)
- Bob Eccles (1992–1993)

== Players earning international caps while at Blackpool Borough ==
- Lionel Emmitt won a cap for Wales while at Blackpool Borough in 1959 against France.
- Graeme Johns won caps for Wales while at Salford in 1979 against France (sub), and while at Blackpool Borough in 1984 against England (sub)
- Donald "Don" Parry won caps for Wales while at Blackpool Borough in 1980 against France, and England, in 1981 against France, and England (2 matches), and in 1982 against Australia. 6-caps 1-try 3-points Hooker.
- Peter Rowe won caps for Wales while at Wigan, Blackpool Borough, and Huddersfield 1969...1979 7-caps + 3-caps (sub), including while at Blackpool Borough in the 1975 Rugby League World Cup against Australia, England, and Australia.
- Hugh Waddell won caps for England while at Blackpool Borough in 1984 against Wales, won caps for Scotland, and won caps for Great Britain while at Oldham in 1988 against France (2 matches), Australia, and New Zealand, and while at Leeds in 1989 against France.

== Other players ==
- Bak Diabira
- Norman Turley circa 1978/79 (ex-Rochdale Hornets)
- Alan Fairhurst circa 1979/80
- Ian Van Bellen circa 1979/80
- Brendan McLoughlin circa 1987/88
- Gary Ainsworth 1990/92
- Charles Armitt circa-1954/57
- Ray Ashby
- David Bacon wing circa-1987/88
- Simon Bamber loose forward circa-1987/88
- Piers Bent 1991–93
- Brian Bevan
- Geoff Bimson scrum-half circa-1987/88
- Tommy Bishop circa-1961
- Dave Bolton
- Billy Boston
- Steve Brennan circa-1985-88 (ex Wigan RLFC 1981–1985)
- Carl Briscoe circa-1987/88 prop (ex-Wigan)
- Paul Broston circa-1987/88
- David Brown circa-1987/88
- Keith Cole
- John Corcoran circa-1981
- Mark Daniels circa-1992/93
- Tony Daniels circa-1992/93
- Allan Blakeley circa-1992/93
- Stan Davies 1956/58
- Steve Donlan circa-1987/88
- Ian Duane circa-1987/88
- Mick Ducie ex-Barrow
- Bob Eccles Prop, Second-row circa-1987/88
- Cliff Eccles second-row circa-1987/88
- Tony Feasey
- Dave Hewitt circa 1991/92 (ex-Salford)
- Peter Hilton circa-1990 – 92 and 1994
- Allan Fallah 1993
- John Emson circa-1987/88
- Peter Fearis circa-1956/67 later of St. Helens
- Gary French circa-1987/88
- Tommy Frodsham stand-off circa-1987/88
- Paul Gamble (Testimonial match 1982) circa-1987/88 on
- Chris Ganley centre circa-1987/88
- Steve Garner hooker circa-1987/88
- Paul Garnett 1990/94 (player and player coach)
- Jimmy Green circa-1987/88
- Denis Gregson circa 1956 ex Salford
- Steve Griffiths circa-1987/88
- Tracey Grundy circa-1987/88 (ex-Wigan)
- Harry Gerrard Hall circa 1966 until 1976 (ex-Warrington Academy)
- Jimmy Hamilton Cumbria prop 1977 Player's No.6 Trophy final
- Paul Hankinson circa-1987/88
- Tony Hodson circa-1987/88
- Keith Holden
- Roy Howarth circa-1987/88
- Jon Hughes 1991–93
- Robert Irving 1981–82
- Denis Jackson ex-Barrow
- Geoff Jamieson circa-1987/88
- Jimmy Johnson wing early-1970s
- Frank Jones ex-Barrow
- Graham Karalius circa-1987/88
- Joe Lewis circa 1972–76
- Denis Litherland circa-1987/88
- Bobby Little ex-Barrow
- Dave Macko ex-Widnes circa 1982
- George Matthews ex-Barrow
- Wally McArthur circa-1956 (ex-Rochdale Hornets)
- Terry McCarrick goal-kicking fullback circa-1960s
- Dave McFarland circa-1987/88
- xIan McKenzie second-row circa-1987/88
- Brian McTigue
- Alec Maitland (Blackpool lad) circa-1963
- Dave Maloney circa-1987/88
- Steve Melling circa-1987/88
- Jim Molyneux (from Wigan) circa-1970s, and 1980s, 3-times Kilkenny Trophy winner
- Mick Nanyn circa-1987/88 (ex-Wigan)
- Mike O'Hara circa-1987/88
- Bill Oxley ex-Barrow
- Brian Parkes circa-1987/88
- Malcolm Pattinson
- Thomas Perenara
- Tim Pickup 1969–71.Australian Rep.1972–75
- Billy Price circa-1987/88
- Andy Ripon 1990–93
- John Risman
- Paul Roberts circa-1987/88
- Derrick Seabrook circa-1987/88
- Joe Smith circa-1987/88
- Mike Smith fullback circa-1987/88
- Michael Stewart centre circa-1987/88
- Adrian Swindells circa-1987/88
- Courtney Thompson wing circa-1987/88
- Mark Viller circa-1987/88
- Tony Waller circa 1987/88
- Les Smith circa – 1978/82 & 1986/87 ex Halifax.
- Dave Walsh circa-1987/88 (ex-Wigan)
- Paul Williams 1991/93
- Ste Wills circa 1982/87
- Danny Wilson circa-1987/88
- Ian Winnard circa-1987/88
- Brian Winstanley player-of-the-year 1966/67
- Chuck Wiseman circa-1960s wing from USA
- David Wood circa-1987/88 (ex-Wigan)

== See also ==
- List of defunct rugby league clubs
- Blackpool Panthers

== Bibliography ==
- Lawrenson, Dave (2007). The Rugby League Miscellany. Vision Sports Publishing. p. 123. ISBN 978-1-905326-30-3.
- Gate, Robert (1991). The Guinness Rugby League Fact Book. Guinness Publishing Ltd. p. 43. ISBN 0-85112-949-8.
- http://members.tripod.com/peterflower/table.htm
- The history of Blackpool Borough
- Two Teams in Wigan!
