= 1963–64 Challenge Cup =

Rugby league competition

- Duration: 5 rounds
- Winners: Widnes
- Runners-up: Hull Kingston Rovers
- Lance Todd Trophy: Frank Collier

The 1963–64 Challenge Cup was the 63rd staging of rugby league's oldest knockout competition, the Challenge Cup.

== First round ==
Date	Team one	Team two	Score
08 Feb	Barrow	Dewsbury	11-6
08 Feb	Blackpool Borough	Doncaster	25-2
08 Feb	Featherstone Rovers	Stanningley Leeds	60-4
08 Feb	Halifax	Batley	0-3
08 Feb	Hull Kingston Rovers	Rochdale Hornets	12-12
08 Feb	Hunslet	Wakefield Trinity	4-4
08 Feb	Keighley	Oldham	4-11
08 Feb	Leigh	Widnes	2-2
08 Feb	Liverpool City	Huddersfield	3-0
08 Feb	St Helens	Castleford	6-13
08 Feb	Salford	Leeds	10-6
08 Feb	Whitehaven	Hull	7-5
08 Feb	Wigan	Swinton	15-15
08 Feb	Workington Town	Warrington	21-3
08 Feb	York	Bramley	5-2
11 Feb	Rochdale Hornets	Hull Kingston Rovers	7-22
12 Feb	Swinton	Wigan	13-8
12 Feb	Wakefield Trinity	Hunslet	7-14
12 Feb	Widnes	Leigh	11-11
17 Feb	Widnes	Leigh	14-2

== Second round ==
Date	Team one	Team two	Score
29 Feb	Batley	Hunslet	6-14
29 Feb	Oldham	Featherstone Rovers	9-7
29 Feb	Blackpool Borough	Thames Board Mills (Warrington)	48-8
29 Feb	Whitehaven	Castleford	5-29
29 Feb	Workington	Swinton	3-11
29 Feb	York	Hull Kingston Rovers	7-23
29 Feb	Widnes	Liverpool City	16-6
29 Feb	Salford	Barrow	4-10

== Quarter-finals ==
Date	Team one	Team two	Score
14 Mar	Widnes	Swinton	5-5
14 Mar	Blackpool Borough	Castleford	4-25
14 Mar	Hull Kingston Rovers	Barrow	38-4
14 Mar	Hunslet	Oldham	5-7
18 Mar	Swinton	Widnes	0-0
23 Mar	Widnes	Swinton	15-3

== Semi-finals ==
Date	Team one	Team two	Score
11 Apr	Hull Kingston Rovers	Oldham	5-5
15 Apr	Oldham	Hull Kingston Rovers	17-14+
18 Apr	Widnes	Castleford	7-7
20 Apr	Hull Kingston Rovers	Oldham	12-2
20 Apr	Castleford	Widnes	5-7

+ Abandoned after 12 minutes of extra time due to bad light.

== Final ==
Widnes beat Hull Kingston Rovers 13–5 in the Challenge Cup played at Wembley Stadium on 9 May before a crowd of 84,488.

This was Widnes’ third Challenge Cup final win in five Final appearances. Frank Collier, their prop forward, was awarded the Lance Todd Trophy for his man-of-the-match performance.

9 May 1964

Widnes	13 – 5	Hull Kingston Rovers
Try: Briers, Myler, Collier; Goal: Randall (2)	Report	Try: Burwell; Goal: Kellett

Wembley, London
Attendance: 84,488
Referee: R.L. Thomas (Oldham)
Player of the Match: Frank Collier

1	Robert Randall
2	Bobby Chisnall
3	Alan Briers
4	Frank Myler
5	William Thompson
6	Ged Lowe
7	Ray Owen
8	Wally Hurstfield
9	George Kemel
10	Frank Collier
11	Jim Measures
12	Arthur Hughes
13	Vince Karalius (c)
Coach:

1	Cyril Kellett
2	Graham Paul
3	Terry Major
4	David Elliott
5	Mike Blackmore
6	Alan Burwell
7	Arthur Bunting
8	Brian Tyson
9	Peter Flanagan
10	Brian Mennell
11	Eric Palmer
12	Len Clark
13	Harry Poole (c)
Coach:
