= Jamie McGhee =

English footballer

Personal information
- Date of birth: 28 September 1989 (age 37)
- Place of birth: Grantham, England
- Position: Winger

Team information
- Current team: Sleaford Town

Senior career*
Years	Team	Apps	(Gls)
2006–2007	Mansfield Town	2	
2007–2008	Mansfield Town	5	
2008–2009	Mansfield Town	5	
2009-2010	Corby Town	25	
2009-2010	Rugby Town	2	
2009-2010	Spalding United	24	
2010-2011	Grantham Town		
2011-2012	Grantham Town		
2012-2013	Grantham Town		
2013-2014	Boston United	17	
2014-2015	Boston United	19	
2015-2016	Boston United	8	
2016-2017	Stamford AFC	18	
2017-2018	Stamford AFC	1	
2018-2019	Harrowby United		
- * Club domestic league appearances and goals

Jamie McGhee (born 28 September 1989) is an English footballer and player/manager of Sleaford Town.

== Early life ==
Born in Grantham, Lincolnshire attending Harrowby Infants and the National school.

== Playing career ==
McGhee is a graduate of the Mansfield Town youth academy, and made his first-team debut for the Stags near the end of the 2006–07 season, appearing as a substitute in the League Two games against Swindon and then Bury.

He was released by Mansfield at the end of the season, and signed for Corby Town in July 2009. During the 2009–10 season he gained experience on loan, making two appearances for Rugby Town in the Southern Football League and also spending time at Spalding United in the United Counties League.

In 2010 McGhee returned to his hometown club Grantham Town in the Northern Premier League Division One South. Over four seasons until 2014 he scored 29 goals in all competitions and was part of the side that reached the play-offs in 2011. Notable moments included a 90th-minute header from a free kick to secure a 1–0 win against Shepshed Dynamo in April 2011.

McGhee joined Boston United on loan in January 2014, debuting against Solihull Moors in the Conference North. The move was made permanent later that year. He made over 35 appearances across the 2013–14 and 2014–15 seasons, scoring twice, including the opening goal in a 2–2 draw with former club Grantham Town in August 2014.

Mid-career moves During the mid-2010s McGhee moved between several non-league clubs. He joined Belper Town on loan from Boston United in January 2015, before returning to Boston in May 2015. In September 2015 he rejoined Grantham Town on a free transfer. He then signed for Stamford A.F.C. in November 2016 and remained there until 2019.

Later playing career McGhee joined Harrowby United in July 2019, initially as a player before transitioning into management. He continued to feature occasionally during the 2020–21 and 2021–22 seasons while taking on managerial

== Managerial career ==
Harrowby United

2018–19

Jamie began his managerial career with Harrowby United in February 2019, taking charge of the first team in the United Counties League Division One. He guided the club to a 7th-place finish in his first partial season.

2019–20

The season was curtailed due to the COVID-19 pandemic. No final league positions were recorded.

2020–21

Harrowby finished 5th in United Counties League Division One. The club also reached the first round proper of the FA Vase. The league season was again cut short due to COVID-19 restrictions.

2021–22

The club finished 10th in Division One and reached the first round proper of the FA Vase.

2022–23

Harrowby finished 9th in Division One.

2023–24

Jamie guided Harrowby to a 5th-place finish in Division One, qualifying for the promotion play-offs. After defeating Clipstone 4–1 in the semi-final, the club beat Newark Town 2–1 in the final to earn promotion to the United Counties League Premier Division North.

2024–25

In Harrowby's first season at Step 5, the club finished 14th in the Premier Division North, securing its status at that level.

2025–26

Harrowby reached the first round proper of the FA Vase. In October 2025 Jamie received a ban from The Football Association and his last match in charge was an away FA Vase first round tie at Coventry United. He later resigned as first team manager of Harrowby United.

Sleaford Town

2025–26

In March 2026, Jamie was appointed manager of Sleaford Town with nine matches remaining. He guided the club to safety on the final day of the season, preserving its Step 6 status in the United Counties League Division One and avoiding back-to-back relegations.

2026–27

Jamie agreed terms with Sleaford Town to remain as first team manager for the 2026–27 season.
