= Moss Lane =

Multi-purpose stadium in Altrincham, Greater Manchester, England

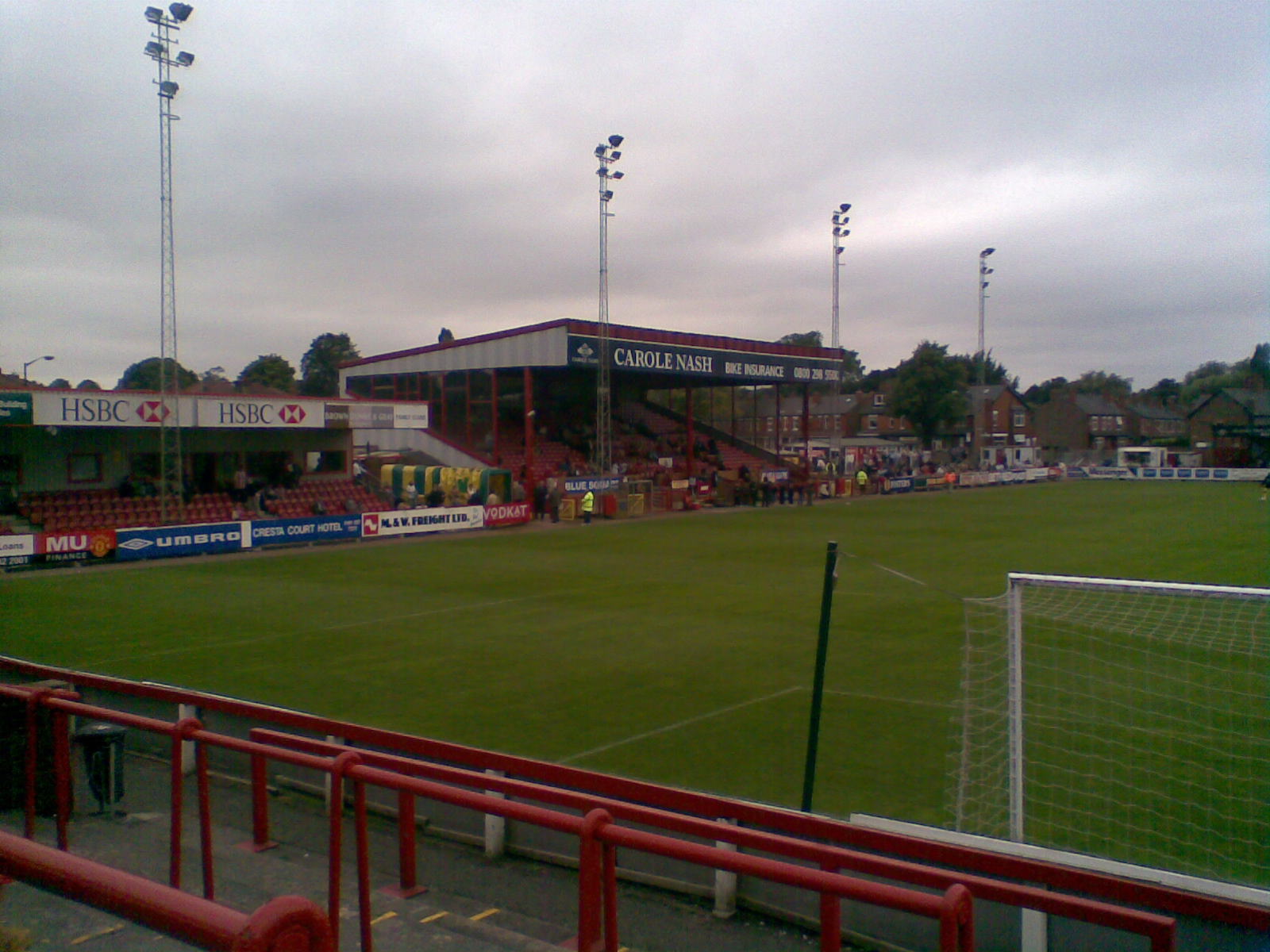
- Main Stand in 2007
- Interactive map of Moss Lane
- Location: Moss Lane; Altrincham; WA15 8AP
- Coordinates: 53°23′00″N 2°20′07″W
- Capacity: 7,873 (1,323 seated)
- Surface: Grass
- Record attendance: 10,275; 28 February 1925

Construction
- Opened: 1910

Tenants
- Altrincham F.C. (1910–present); Trafford Borough RLFC (1989–1992); Manchester United F.C. Under 18s

Moss Lane is a multi-purpose stadium in Altrincham, Greater Manchester, England. It is currently used primarily for football matches and is the home ground of Altrincham. The stadium also hosts games for Manchester United's under 17s side, and women's development team, as well as serving as a backup home venue for Manchester United W.F.C.

The stadium comprises two all-seater stands on one side with a combined capacity of 1,323 spectators and terraces on the other three sides, giving a total capacity of 7,873.

Chorley Borough RLFC moved to Moss Lane for the 1989–90 season and renamed themselves Trafford Borough RLFC. Trafford Borough played at Moss Lane for three seasons before moving to Blackpool as Blackpool Gladiators RLFC for the 1992–93 season.

In 2013, scrap metal processing company J. Davidson acquired naming rights to the stadium.
