= Paul Roberts (rugby league) =

Australian rugby league footballer

Personal information
- Full name: Paul Roberts
- Born: 10 November 1962 (age 62)

Playing information
- Position: Second-row, Centre
Club
Years	Team	Pld	T	G	FG	P
1986–91	South Sydney	70	14	0	0	56

Paul Roberts is an Australian former rugby league footballer who played in the 1980s and 1990s. He played for South Sydney in the New South Wales Rugby League (NSWRL) competition.

== Playing career ==
Roberts made his first grade debut for South Sydney in round 10 of the 1986 against the Canberra Raiders at Seiffert Oval. At the end of the 1986 season, South Sydney finished in second place on the table. Roberts played in the club's major preliminary finals defeat against Canterbury-Bankstown.

Roberts was an integral part of the South Sydney team and in 1989 he played 21 games as the club won the minor premiership. Roberts played in South Sydney's preliminary final defeat against the Canberra Raiders at the Sydney Football Stadium.

In 1990, Roberts played no first grade games for Souths and only managed one appearance for the reserve grade team. This was mainly due to an off-field incident which happened in 1989 when Roberts was glassed in the eye during an altercation at a local pub. In 2013 Roberts recalled the incident saying “There were two guys, big fellas, laying into my cousin. So, you know, whaddya do?, I’ve gone running in to help but, as I did, one of them turned and glassed me. Drove it right into my face". Roberts departed South Sydney at the end of the 1991 season after the club finished 14th on the table. Roberts made a total of 126 appearances for Souths across all grades.
