= 1962–63 Northern Rugby Football League season =

- League: First Division
- Champions: Swinton
- Top point-scorer(s): Kel Coslett 321
- Top try-scorer(s): Ray Glastonbury 41

Promotion and relegation
- Promoted from Second Division: Hunslet; Keighley
- Relegated to Second Division: Oldham; Bramley

Second Division
- Champions: Hunslet

The 1962–63 Northern Rugby Football League season was the 68th season of rugby league football.

== Season summary ==
1962–63 season saw the league split into two divisions with each team playing each other team home and away. The introduction of an even league meant the end of season championship play-off was abolished and the team finishing top of the table was declared champions.

1962-63 finished up with huge fixture backlogs similar to 1946-47 after "the Big Freeze" brought heavy snow and postponed most rugby league matches for two and half months.

Swinton won their fifth Championship. Oldham and Bramley were demoted to the Second Division.

The Challenge Cup winners were Wakefield Trinity who beat Wigan 25–10 in the final.

The 2nd Division Champions were Hunslet who were promoted along with second placed Keighley.

Workington Town (from Cumberland) won the Lancashire League, and Wakefield Trinity won the Yorkshire League. St. Helens beat Swinton 7–4 to win the Lancashire County Cup, and Hunslet beat Hull Kingston Rovers 12–2 to win the Yorkshire County Cup.

== First Division ==
	Team	Pld	W	D	L	Pts
1	Swinton	30	22	1	7	45
2	St. Helens	30	19	1	10	39
3	Widnes	30	19	1	10	39
4	Castleford	30	16	3	11	35
5	Wakefield Trinity	30	16	1	13	33
6	Warrington	30	15	2	13	32
7	Leeds	30	16	0	14	32
8	Wigan	30	14	2	14	30
9	Huddersfield	30	14	0	16	28
10	Hull Kingston Rovers	30	13	1	16	27
11	Featherstone Rovers	30	12	3	15	27
12	Workington Town	30	12	3	15	27
13	Halifax	30	13	1	16	27
14	Hull	30	10	2	18	22
15	Oldham	30	9	1	20	19
16	Bramley	30	9	0	21	18

Champions	Relegated

== Second Division ==
	Team	Pld	W	D	L	PF	PA	Pts
1	Hunslet	26	22	0	4	508	214	44
2	Keighley	26	21	0	5	450	187	42
3	York	26	16	1	9	418	243	33
4	Blackpool Borough	26	15	0	11	281	247	30
5	Rochdale Hornets	26	14	1	11	282	243	29
6	Barrow	26	14	0	12	413	280	28
7	Leigh	26	14	0	12	361	264	28
8	Batley	26	13	1	12	275	322	27
9	Whitehaven	26	12	2	12	318	306	26
10	Doncaster	26	10	0	16	283	329	20
11	Liverpool City	26	9	1	16	159	328	19
12	Salford	26	8	1	17	271	442	17
13	Dewsbury	26	8	0	18	200	345	16
14	Bradford Northern	26	2	1	23	163	632	5

Promoted

== Challenge Cup ==
Wakefield Trinity beat Wigan 25–10 in the challenge Cup Final played at Wembley, in front of a crowd of 84,492.

This was Wakefield Trinity's fifth Cup Final win in their fifth Final appearance and their second in successive seasons. Harold Poynton, their stand-off half was awarded the Lance Todd Trophy for his man-of-the-match performance.

== County championships ==
Prior to the start of the league season in October, each team played eight fixtures in a regional competition, with teams being split into a Western and Eastern Division. The top four teams in each division competed in the play-offs for the Divisional Championship.

=== Western Division ===
Pos	Team	P	W	D	L	PF	PA	Pts
1	Workington Town	8	8	0	0	230	44	16
2	St Helens	8	7	1	0	216	73	15
3	Widnes	8	7	0	1	180	54	14
4	Wigan	8	7	0	1	213	72	14
5	Swinton	8	7	0	1	158	61	14
6	Warrington	8	6	0	2	171	93	12
7	Oldham	8	5	0	3	137	91	10
8	Barrow	8	3	0	5	81	144	6
9	Whitehaven	8	2	0	6	84	174	4
10	Rochdale Hornets	8	2	0	6	47	172	4
11	Leigh	8	1	0	7	81	154	2
12	Blackpool Borough	8	0	1	7	67	162	1
13	Liverpool City	8	0	0	8	57	204	0
14	Salford	8	0	0	8	71	295	0

==== Semi-finals ====
9 October 1962

St Helens	9 – 10	Widnes
Tries: Watson; Goals: Coslett (3)		Tries: Myler, Measures; Goals: Randall (2)

Knowsley Road
Attendance: 20,200

15 October 1962

Workington Town	27 – 9	Wigan
Tries: Pretorius, O'Neill (3), Archer, W. Martin, Glastonbury; Goals: Ferreira (3)		Tries: Carlton (2), Davies

Derwent Park

==== Final ====
10 November 1962

Widnes	9 – 9	Workington Town
Tries: Thompson; Goals: Randall (3)		Tries: Pretorius; Goals: Lowdon (3)

Central Park, Wigan
Attendance: 13,588
Referee: M. Coates (Pudsey)

===== Replay =====
21 November 1962

Widnes	0 – 10	Workington Town
		Tries: Pretorius, Glastonbury; Goals: Lowdon (2)

Central Park, Wigan
Attendance: 7,584
Referee: D.S. Brown (Dewsbury)

=== Eastern Division ===
Pos	Team	P	W	D	L	PF	PA	Pts
1	Huddersfield	8	8	0	0	211	44	16
2	Hull Kingston Rovers	8	8	0	0	189	72	16
3	Featherstone Rovers	8	7	0	1	181	71	14
4	Halifax	8	7	0	1	166	73	14
5	Leeds	8	6	1	1	177	65	13
6	Wakefield Trinity	8	6	0	2	193	65	12
7	Castleford	8	4	0	4	117	137	8
8	Hunslet	8	4	0	4	109	144	8
9	Bramley	8	3	0	5	108	130	6
10	York	8	2	0	6	128	139	4
11	Hull	8	2	0	6	96	142	4
12	Keighley	8	2	0	6	79	155	4
13	Batley	8	1	1	6	63	132	3
14	Bradford Northern	8	1	0	7	86	236	2
15	Doncaster	8	1	0	7	40	160	2
16	Dewsbury	8	1	0	7	56	234	2

==== Semi-finals ====
10 October 1962

Huddersfield	17 – 0	Halifax
Tries: Bowman (3); Goals: Dyson (4)

Fartown
Referee: N.T. Railton

15 October 1962

Hull Kingston Rovers	27 – 11	Featherstone Rovers
Tries: Paul (3), A. Burwell, Hatch; Goals: Kellett (6)		Tries: Greatorex; Goals: Clawson (4)

Craven Park
Attendance: 9,500
Referee: J. Manley

==== Final ====
10 November 1962

Huddersfield	10 – 13	Hull Kingston Rovers
Tries: Heywood, Smales; Goals: Dyson (2)		Tries: Paul (2), Harris; Goals: Kellett (2)

Headingley, Leeds
Attendance: 6,822
Referee: T. W. Watkinson (Manchester)

== Sources ==
- Saxton, Irvin (ed.). History of Rugby League: No.68 1962–1963. League Publications.
- 1962-63 Rugby Football League season at wigan.rlfans.com
- The Challenge Cup at The Rugby Football League website
