= 1958–59 Yorkshire Cup =

- Structure: Regional knockout championship
- Teams: 16
- Winners: Leeds
- Runners-up: Wakefield Trinity

The 1958 Yorkshire Cup was the fifty-first occasion on which the Yorkshire Cup competition had been held. Leeds won the trophy by beating Wakefield Trinity by the score of 24–20.

== Background ==
This season there were no junior/amateur clubs taking part, no new entrants and no "leavers" and so the total of entries remained the same at sixteen.
This in turn resulted in no byes in the first round.

== Competition and results ==
=== Round 1 ===
Involved 8 matches (with no byes) and 16 clubs

| Game No | Fixture date | Home team | Score | Away team | Venue | Att | Rec | Notes | Ref |
|---|---|---|---|---|---|---|---|---|---|
| 1 | Sat 30 Aug 1958 | Batley | 21–5 | Featherstone Rovers | Mount Pleasant | | | | |
| 2 | Sat 30 Aug 1958 | Bradford Northern | 23–31 | York | Odsal | | | | |
| 3 | Sat 30 Aug 1958 | Bramley | 16–34 | Hull F.C. | Barley Mow | | | | |
| 4 | Sat 30 Aug 1958 | Castleford | 5–33 | Hull Kingston Rovers | Wheldon Road | | | | |
| 5 | Sat 30 Aug 1958 | Dewsbury | 12–29 | Keighley | Crown Flatt | | | | |
| 6 | Sat 30 Aug 1958 | Halifax | 52–0 | Doncaster | Thrum Hall | | | | |
| 7 | Sat 30 Aug 1958 | Leeds | 64–17 | Huddersfield | Headingley | 15600 | | | |
| 8 | Sat 30 Aug 1958 | Wakefield Trinity | 10–10 | Hunslet | Belle Vue | | | | |

=== Round 1 - replays ===
Involved 1 match and 2 clubs

| Game No | Fixture date | Home team | Score | Away team | Venue | Att | Rec | Notes | Ref |
|---|---|---|---|---|---|---|---|---|---|
| R | Wed 3 Sep 1958 | Hunslet | 11–15 | Wakefield Trinity | Parkside | | | | |

=== Round 2 - quarterfinals ===
Involved 4 matches and 8 clubs

| Game No | Fixture date | Home team | Score | Away team | Venue | Att | Rec | Notes | Ref |
|---|---|---|---|---|---|---|---|---|---|
| 1 | Tue 9 Sep 1958 | Batley | 23–7 | Hull Kingston Rovers | Mount Pleasant | | | | |
| 2 | Tue 9 Sep 1958 | Halifax | 15–19 | York | Thrum Hall | | | | |
| 3 | Tue 9 Sep 1958 | Hull F.C. | 16–17 | Wakefield Trinity | Boulevard | | | | |
| 4 | Wed 10 Sep 1958 | Leeds | 17–15 | Keighley | Headingley | | | | |

=== Round 3 – semifinals ===
Involved 2 matches and 4 clubs

| Game No | Fixture date | Home team | Score | Away team | Venue | Att | Rec | Notes | Ref |
|---|---|---|---|---|---|---|---|---|---|
| 1 | Wed 17 Sep 1958 | York | 10–13 | Leeds | Clarence Street | | | | |
| 2 | Wed 1 Oct 1958 | Wakefield Trinity | 21–13 | Batley | Belle Vue | | | | |

=== Final ===
The 1958 Yorkshire Cup final was played at Odsal in the City of Bradford, now in West Yorkshire. The attendance was 26,927 and receipts were £3,833.

| Fixture date | Home team | Score | Away team | Venue | Att | Rec | Notes | Ref |
|---|---|---|---|---|---|---|---|---|
| Saturday 18 October 1958 | Leeds | 24–20 | Wakefield Trinity | Odsal | 26,927 | £3,833 | (Note: The receipts are given as £3,833 by the Rothmans Rugby League Yearbook of 1991-92 and 1990-91 but £3 less at £3,832 by "100 Years of Rugby. The History of Wakefield Trinity 1873-1973 by J C Lindley and D W Armitage) (Note: Odsal is the home ground of Bradford Northern from 1890 to 2010 and the current capacity is in the region of 26,000, The ground is famous for hosting the largest attendance at an English sports ground when 102,569 (it was reported that over 120,000 actually attended as several areas of boundary fencing collapse under the sheer weight of numbers) attended the replay of the Challenge Cup final on 5 May 1954 to see Halifax v Warrington) | |

==== Teams and scorers ====
| Leeds | No. | Wakefield Trinity |
|---|---|---|
| | Teams | |
| Pat Quinn | 1 | Frank Mortimer |
| Garry Hemingway | 2 | Fred Smith |
| Jack Lendill | 3 | Donald "Don" Metcalfe |
| Lewis Jones | 4 | Neil Fox |
| Del Hodgkinson | 5 | Stan Smith |
| Gordon Brown | 6 | Keith Holliday |
| Jeff Stevenson | 7 | Ken Rollin |
| Tony Skelton | 8 | Wilfred "Wilf" Adams |
| Barry Simms | 9 | Joby Shaw |
| Don Robinson | 10 | Samuel "Sam" Evans |
| Fred Ward | 11 | Bob Kelly |
| Colin Tomlinson | 12 | Les Chamberlain |
| Alec Dick | 13 | Ken Traill |
| probably Joe Warham | Coach | Ken Traill |
| 24 | score | 20 |
| 18 | HT | 7 |
| | Scorers | |
| | Tries | |
| 6 | T | Donald "Don" Metcalfe (3) |
| Barry Simms (1) | T | Ken Rollin (1) |
| | T | |
| | T | |
| | Goals | |
| 3 | G | Frank Mortimer (2) |
| | G | Neil Fox (2) |
| | Drop Goals | |
| | DG | |
| Referee | | unknown |

Scoring - Try = three (3) points - Goal = two (2) points - Drop goal = two (2) points

=== The road to success ===
First round
Halifax | 52
Doncaster | 0
Bradford Northern | 23
York | 31
Leeds | 64
Huddersfield | 17
Dewsbury | 12
Keighley | 29
Bramley | 16
Hull F.C. | 34
Wakefield Trinity | 10 (15)
Hunslet | 10 (11)
Batley | 21
Featherstone Rovers | 5
Castleford | 5
Hull Kingston Rovers | 33

Second round
Halifax | 15
York | 19
Leeds | 17
Keighley | 15
Hull F.C. | 16
Wakefield Trinity | 17
Batley | 23
Hull Kingston Rovers | 7

Semifinals
York | 10
Leeds | 13
Wakefield Trinity | 21
Batley | 13

Final
Leeds | 24
Wakefield Trinity | 20

== See also ==
- Rugby league county cups
