= Colin Evans (rugby) =

Wales dual-code rugby international footballer

Personal information
- Full name: Colin Evans
- Born: 20 November 1936; Blaenavon, Wales
- Died: 23 November 1992 (aged 56); Leeds, England

Playing information

Rugby union
- Position: Scrum-half
Club
Years	Team	Pld	T	G	FG	P
	Blaenavon RFC
≤1955–55	Tredegar RFC
1955–58	Newport RFC	60	5	0	1
1958–60	Pontypool RFC
	Total	60	5	0	1	0
Representative
Years	Team	Pld	T	G	FG	P
1960	Wales	1

Rugby league
- Position: Scrum-half
Club
Years	Team	Pld	T	G	FG	P
1960–≥63	Leeds
≤1966–66	York
1966–≥72	Keighley	165
	Total	165	0	0	0	0
Representative
Years	Team	Pld	T	G	FG	P
	Rest of the World
1963–69	Wales	2

Coaching information
Club
Years	Team	Gms	W	D	L	W%
1972–≥76	Keighley (assistant)

Colin Evans (20 November 1936 – 23 November 1992) was a Welsh dual-code international rugby union, and professional rugby league footballer who played in the 1950s, 1960s and 1970s. He played representative level rugby union (RU) for Wales, and at club level for Blaenavon RFC, Tredegar RFC, Newport RFC and Pontypool RFC, as a scrum-half, and representative level rugby league (RL) for Wales and Rest of the World, and at club level for Leeds, York and Keighley (captain), as a scrum-half. and at club level was assistant coach at Keighley.

== Background ==
Colin Evans was born in Blaenavon, Wales, he was married to Jean, he worked at Kirstall Forge, Leeds, and he died aged 56 in Leeds, West Yorkshire, England.

== Playing career ==
=== International honours ===
Colin Evans won a cap for Wales (RU) while at Pontypool in 1960 in the 6–14 defeat by England at Twickenham Stadium on Saturday 16 January 1960, won 2 caps for Wales (RL) in 1963–1969 while at Leeds, and Keighley, and played for Rest of the World against France.

=== Championship final appearances ===
Colin Evans played scrum-half, and scored a try in Leeds' 25–10 victory over Warrington in the Championship Final during the 1960–61 season at Odsal Stadium, Bradford on Saturday 20 May 1961, in front of a crowd of 52,177.

=== County Cup Final appearances ===
Colin Evans played scrum-half in Leeds' 9–19 defeat by Wakefield Trinity in the 1961 Yorkshire Cup Final during the 1961–62 season at Odsal Stadium, Bradford on Saturday 11 November 1961.

=== Club career ===
In a "merry-go-round", in 1957 Colin Evans lost his Newport RFC scrum-half place to Brian Scrivens, and so Evans joined Pontypool RFC, where he displaced Billy Watkins, and so Watkins joined Newport RFC, where he displaced Scrivens, a similar pattern occurred for Wales, Watkins won a cap in 1959 against France, Scrivens then displaced Watkins in the Welsh trial, but joined Wigan (RL) on the verge of a cap in October 1959, Evans displaced Watkins for cap in 1960 against England. Colin Evans was transferred from York to Keighley on Wednesday 5 October 1966, he made his début for Keighley against Halifax at Thrum Hall, Halifax on Saturday 8 October 1966.

== Honoured at Keighley Cougars ==
Colin Evans is a Keighley Cougars Hall of Fame Inductee.
