= Brian Scrivens =

English rugby footballer (1937–2025)

Personal information
- Born: 1 September 1937 Weston-super-Mare, Somerset, England
- Died: 25 January 2025 (aged 87) Glenridding, Cumbria, England

Playing information

Rugby union
- Position: Scrum-half
Club
Years	Team	Pld	T	G	FG	P
1955–59	Newport RFC	80	11
Representative
Years	Team	Pld	T	G	FG	P
1958–59	Crawshays RFC

Rugby league
- Position: Scrum-half
Club
Years	Team	Pld	T	G	FG	P
1959–61	Wigan	19	1	0	0	3

Brian Douglas Abraham Joseph Scrivens (1 September 1937 – 25 January 2025) was an English-born (of Welsh parents) rugby union, and professional rugby league footballer who played in the 1950s and 1960s. He played invitational level rugby union (RU) for Crawshays RFC, and at club level for Newport RFC, as a scrum-half, and club level rugby league (RL) for Wigan, as a scrum-half.

== Background ==
Brian Scrivens was born in Weston-super-Mare, Somerset, England on 1 September 1937.

Scrivens died on 25 January 2025, at the age of 87.

== Playing career ==
=== Championship appearances ===
Brian Scrivens played in Wigan's victory in the Championship during the 1959–60 season.

=== Notable tour matches ===
Brian Scrivens played in Newport RFC's 11-0 victory over Australia (RU) in 1957.

=== Club career ===
In a "merry-go-round", in 1957 Colin Evans lost his Newport RFC Scrum-half place to Brian Scrivens, and so Evans joined Pontypool RFC, where he displaced Billy Watkins, and so Watkins joined Newport RFC, where he displaced Scrivens, a similar pattern occurred for Wales, Watkins won a cap in 1959 against France, Scrivens then displaced Watkins in the Welsh trial, but joined Wigan (RL) on the verge of a cap in October 1959, Evans displaced Watkins for cap in 1960 against England. Brian Scrivens was selected for Newport RFC in the Snelling Sevens, but following an injury in the second round, he was replaced by Clive Lewis.

Brian Scrivens made his début for Wigan in the 6-0 victory over Workington Town at Derwent Park on Saturday 12 December 1959, he scored his only try for Wigan in the 47-3 victory over Blackpool Borough at Central Park, Wigan on Saturday 19 December 1959, and he played his last match for Wigan in the 15-17 defeat by Leigh at Central Park, Wigan, on Saturday 15 October 1960.

== Outside of rugby ==
Brian Scrivens' parents were originally from Cardiff and transferred to Newport during World War II, he attended Brynglas Secondary School, where one of his teachers was Arthur Hedley Rowland ((13 January 1919 — 30 August 2007) Newport RFC and Monmouthshire County RFC, Croix de Guerre for bravery in World War II), Scrivens was approached by St. Helens (RL) when aged both 14, and 16, he worked at Bulldog Tools, Wigan, and following retirement in September 1996 he moved to Glenridding, Cumbria, where he has been the chairman of Patterdale Parish Council.
