= 1961–62 Yorkshire Cup =

- Structure: Regional knockout championship
- Teams: 16
- Winners: Wakefield Trinity
- Runners-up: Leeds

The 1961–62 Yorkshire Cup was the fifty-fourth occasion on which the Yorkshire Cup competition had been held.

Wakefield Trinity winning the trophy by beating Leeds by the score of 19–9

The match was played at Odsal in the City of Bradford, now in West Yorkshire. The attendance was 16,329 and receipts were £2,864

This was Wakefield Trinity's second consecutive triumph and the club's fourth appearance out of five in a period of nine years (which included four as cup winners and one as runner-up)

== Background ==
This season there were no junior/amateur clubs taking part, no new entrants and no "leavers" and so the total of entries remained the same at sixteen.

This in turn resulted in no byes in the first round.

== Competition and results ==
=== Round 1 ===
Involved 8 matches (with no byes) and 16 clubs

Game No	Fixture date	Home team	Score	Away team	Venue	Att	Rec	Notes	Ref
1	Fri 1 Sep 1961	Castleford	37–8	Halifax	Wheldon Road				
2	Fri 1 Sep 1961	Dewsbury	0–15	Batley	Crown Flatt				
3	Sat 2 Sep 1961	Featherstone Rovers	31–6	Doncaster	Post Office Road				
4	Sat 2 Sep 1961	Hull F.C.	9–8	Huddersfield	Boulevard	11,000			
5	Sat 2 Sep 1961	Keighley	14–23	Hunslet	Lawkholme Lane				
6	Sat 2 Sep 1961	Leeds	46–13	Hull Kingston Rovers	Headingley				
7	Sat 2 Sep 1961	Wakefield Trinity	73–5	Bradford Northern	Belle Vue			(Note: This was both the record score and winning margin at the time. It also equalled Wakefield Trinity's record score (v Broughton Moor Amat in 1950) - Gerry Round kicked 11 goals to equal the club record)	
8	Sat 2 Sep 1961	York	36–15	Bramley	Clarence Street				

=== Round 2 - quarterfinals ===
Involved 4 matches and 8 clubs

Game No	Fixture date	Home team	Score	Away team	Venue	Att	Rec	Notes	Ref
1	Wed 13 Sep 1961	Leeds	20–12	Castleford	Headingley				
2	Tue 19 Sep 1961	Featherstone Rovers	21–11	Batley	Post Office Road				
3	Tue 19 Sep 1961	Hull F.C.	7–13	Wakefield Trinity	Boulevard				
4	Wed 20 Sep 1961	York	31–9	Hunslet	Clarence Street				

=== Round 3 – semifinals ===
Involved 2 matches and 4 clubs

Game No	Fixture date	Home team	Score	Away team	Venue	Att	Rec	Notes	Ref
1	Wed 4 Oct 1961	Leeds	11–3	Featherstone Rovers	Headingley				
2	Wed 4 Oct 1961	Wakefield Trinity	24–4	York	Belle Vue				

=== Final ===
Game No	Fixture date	Home team	Score	Away team	Venue	Att	Rec	Notes	Ref
	Saturday 11 November 1961	Wakefield Trinity	19–9	Leeds	Odsal	16,329	£2,864	(Note: The attendance is given as 16,429 by "100 Years of Rugby. The History of Wakefield Trinity 1873-1973" and 16,329 by RUGBYLEAGUEproject and by the Rothmans Rugby League Yearbook of 1991-92 and 1990-91) (Note: The receipts are quoted as £2,914 by "100 Years of Rugby. The History of Wakefield Trinity 1873-1973" but £2,864 in the Rothmans Rugby League Yearbook of 1991-92 and 1990-91) (Note: Odsal is the home ground of Bradford Northern from 1890 to 2010 and the current capacity is in the region of 26,000, The ground is famous for hosting the largest attendance at an English sports ground when 102,569 (it was reported that over 120,000 actually attended as several areas of boundary fencing collapse under the sheer weight of numbers) attended the replay of the Challenge Cup final on 5 May 1954 to see Halifax v Warrington)	

==== Teams and scorers ====
Wakefield Trinity	№	Leeds
	teams	
Gerry Round	1	Ken Thornett
Fred Smith	2	Garry Hemingway
Alan Skene	3	Dennis Goodwin
Neil Fox	4	Fred Pickup
Colin Greenwood	5	Eddie Ratcliffe
Harold Poynton	6	Lewis Jones
Keith Holliday	7	Colin Evans
Jack Wilkinson	8	Don Robinson
Milan Kosanović	9	Barry Simms
Albert Firth	10	Trevor Whitehead
Brian Briggs	11	Jack Fairbank
Don Vines	12	John Sykes
Derek "Rocky" Turner (c)	13	Colin Tomlinson
Ken Traill	Coach	Dai Prosser
	Football Manager	Joe Warham
19	score	9
5	HT	5
	Scorers	
	Tries	
Derek "Rocky" Turner (1)	T	Garry Hemingway (1)
Alan Skene (1)	T	
Fred Smith (1)	T	
	Goals	
Neil Fox (5)	G	Lewis Jones (3)
	G	
	Drop Goals	
	DG	
Referee		Tom Watkinson (Manchester)

Scoring - Try = three (3) points - Goal = two (2) points - Drop goal = two (2) points

=== The road to success ===
First round
Hull F.C.	9
Huddersfield	8
Wakefield Trinity	73
Bradford Northern	5
York	36
Bramley	15
Keighley	14
Hunslet	23
Leeds	46
Hull Kingston Rovers	13
Castleford	37
Halifax	8
Featherstone Rovers	31
Doncaster	6
Dewsbury	0
Batley	15

Second round
Hull F.C.	7
Wakefield Trinity	13
York	31
Hunslet	9
Leeds	20
Castleford	12
Featherstone Rovers	21
Batley	11

Semifinals
Wakefield Trinity	24
York	4
Leeds	11
Featherstone Rovers	3

Final
Wakefield Trinity	19
Leeds	9

== See also ==
- 1961–62 Northern Rugby Football League season
- Rugby league county cups
