= Don Robinson (rugby league) =

GB & England international rugby league footballer and coach

Personal information
- Full name: Donald Robinson
- Born: 4 June 1932 Castleford, England
- Died: 27 May 2017 (aged 84)

Playing information
- Position: Centre, Prop, Second-row, Loose forward
Club
Years	Team	Pld	T	G	FG	P
1949–56	Wakefield Trinity	199	76	0	0	228
1956–64	Leeds	296	63	0	0	189
1964–65	Doncaster	48	3	0	0	9
	Total	543	142	0	0	426
Representative
Years	Team	Pld	T	G	FG	P
1951–56	Rugby League XIII	≥2
1951–56	Yorkshire	9
1951–56	England	3	1	0	0	3
1954–60	Great Britain	10	0	0	0	0

Coaching information
Club
Years	Team	Gms	W	D	L	W%
1964	Doncaster
1964	Bramley
1978–79	Bramley
	Total	0	0	0	0

Donald Robinson (4 June 1932 – 27 May 2017) was an English World Cup winning professional rugby league footballer who played in the 1940s, 1950s and 1960s, and coached in the 1960s and 1970s. He played at representative level for Great Britain, England, Yorkshire and Rugby League XIII, and at club level for St Joseph's School, Airedale Youth Club, Fryston Colliery, Kippax Juniors, Newmarket Colliery, Wakefield Trinity (captain), Leeds and Doncaster, as a centre, prop, second-row or loose forward, and coached at Doncaster and Bramley (late-1970s).

== Background ==
Robinson was born in Castleford, West Riding of Yorkshire, England, he died aged 84, and his funeral took place at 12:30 pm on Thursday 15 June 2017 at St. Mary Magdalene's Church, Altofts, Normanton.

== Playing career ==
=== Championship final appearances ===
Don Robinson played at prop in Leeds' 25–10 victory over Warrington in the Championship Final during the 1960–61 season at Odsal Stadium, Bradford on Saturday 20 May 1961, in front of a crowd of 52,177.

=== Challenge Cup Final appearances ===
Don Robinson played at second-row and scored a try in Leeds' 9–7 victory over Barrow in the 1956–57 Challenge Cup Final during the 1956–57 season at Wembley Stadium, London on Saturday 11 May 1957, in front of a crowd of 76,318, he played the match with the fractured wrist he had sustained in the previous week's 12–22 defeat by Oldham in the Championship semi-final, the initial diagnosis was that he would be unable to play for up to four months, the doctors at the Leeds General Infirmary developed a special cast, and his injury was kept secret.

=== County Cup Final appearances ===
Don Robinson played at second-row and scored a try in Wakefield Trinity's 17–3 victory over Keighley in the 1951–52 Yorkshire Cup Final during the 1951–52 season at Fartown Ground, Huddersfield on Saturday 27 October 1951, played at second-row in Leeds' 24–20 victory over by Wakefield Trinity in the 1958–59 Yorkshire Cup Final during the 1958–59 season at Odsal Stadium, Bradford on Saturday 18 October 1958, and played at prop in the 9–19 defeat by Wakefield Trinity in the 1961–62 Yorkshire Cup Final during the 1961–62 season at Odsal Stadium, Bradford on Saturday 11 November 1961

=== Notable tour matches ===
Don Robinson played, and scored a try in Leeds' victory over Australia in the 1956–57 Kangaroo tour of Great Britain and France match at Headingley, Leeds.

=== Club career ===
Don Robinson is the second youngest player (behind Jordan Crowther) to make his début as a forward for Wakefield Trinity, aged 17-years and 9-months, he made his début against Dewsbury in the 1949–50 Challenge Cup replay during the 1949–50 season at Crown Flatt, Dewsbury on Wednesday 1 March 1950, he was transferred from Wakefield Trinity to Leeds in January 1956, with Fred Smith going the other way. In addition, Wakefield Trinity also received £3,000 (based on increases in average earnings, this would be approximately £155,300 in 2013), he made his début for Leeds, and scored a try, against York on Saturday 4 February 1956, during the 1957–58 season he played in each of Leeds' 43 league, and cup matches, becoming the first Leeds player to complete an ever-present campaign in the post-World War II period.

=== Representative honours ===
Robinson represented the Rugby League XIII while at Wakefield Trinity in 1951 against France, and in 1954 against Australasia, won caps for England while at Wakefield Trinity in 1951 against France, in 1955 against Other Nationalities, and while at Leeds in 1956 against France, and won caps for Great Britain while at Wakefield Trinity in the 1954 Rugby League World Cup against France, New Zealand, and Australia, and France, in 1955 against New Zealand, and while at Leeds in 1956 against Australia (2 matches), in 1959 against Australia (2 matches); including scoring the fastest try ever scored in a Test match in the 11–10 victory over Australia, in the second, and levelling Test match at Headingley, Leeds, and in 1960 against France.

Robinson played ats a second-row in all four of Great Britain's 1954 Rugby League World Cup matches, including Great Britain's 16–12 victory over France in the 1954 Rugby League World Cup Final at Parc des Princes, Paris on 13 November 1954 and was named man of the match. For his participation in these four matches, Don Robinson was paid a total of £25 (based on increases in average earnings, this would be approximately £1,493 in 2013).

Robinson also represented Great Britain while at Leeds between 1952 and 1956 against France (1 non-Test match).

Robinson was selected for Yorkshire County XIII whilst at Wakefield Trinity during the 1951/52; including against New Zealand, 1954/55 and 1955/56 seasons.
