= Geoff Oakes =

English rugby league footballer (1938–2026)

Personal information
- Full name: Geoffrey Oakes
- Born: 20 May 1938 Belle Vue, Wakefield, England
- Died: 30 May 2026 (aged 88)

Playing information
- Position: Hooker
Club
Years	Team	Pld	T	G	FG	P
1958–1968	Wakefield Trinity	197	8	0	0	24
1964–1967	Warrington	47+1	1	0	0	3
1967–1968	Wakefield Trinity
	Total	245	9	0	0	27

Geoffrey Oakes (20 May 1938 – 30 May 2026) was an English professional rugby league footballer who played in the 1950s and 1960s. He played at club level for Wakefield Trinity (two spells) and Warrington as a hooker.

== Background ==
Geoff Oakes was born in Belle Vue, Wakefield, West Riding of Yorkshire, England on 20 May 1938. He worked at Walton Colliery c. 1960.

Oakes played soccer as a goalkeeper at Thornes House Grammar School and started playing rugby at age 16.

In 1955, he played two matches for Yorkshire Amateurs U-18 against Lancashire and Cumberland whilst with the Trinity Juniors and signed for Wakefield Trinity in 1956 and remained with Trinity until 1964. Oakes made his first team appearance with Harold Poynton and Reg Parker in 1958 against St Helens. He played in two winning Wembley finals, two championship finals and one Yorkshire Cup.

He signed for Warrington in 1964 and whilst there won a Lancashire Cup winners medal. In 1967 he returned to Wakefield and retired in 1968 after breaking a leg in a match against St Helens, missing the "water splash" final, having played in all previous rounds.

Oakes's other sporting interest was golf, and he was a former member and the past captain of the City of Wakefield Golf Club. He played in many pro-ams around the world, winning 25 events including Monaco, Trinidad and Tobago, Acapulco and Biarritz. Professionals played alongside included Mike Slater, Hedley Muscroft, Ronan Rafferty, Paul Carrigill, Bill Ferguson and local professional Adrian Ambler.

Oakes also became interested in Horse Riding and took part in one day hunter trials, winning at Heath, Wakefield and hunted several times with Rockwood and Badsworth hunts.

While owning the Quarry Inn, Horbury, he improved his cooking skills and continued to do so in retirement.

Geoff had two children and two grandchildren. He died on 30 May 2026, aged 88.

== Playing career ==
=== Championship final appearances ===
Oakes played hooker in Wakefield Trinity's 3–27 defeat by Wigan in the Championship Final during the 1959–60 season at Odsal Stadium, Bradford on Saturday 21 May 1960, and played hooker in the 5–14 defeat by Huddersfield in the Championship Final during the 1961–62 season at Odsal Stadium, Bradford on Saturday 19 May 1962.

=== Challenge Cup Final appearances ===
Oakes played hooker in Wakefield Trinity's 38–5 victory over Hull F.C. in the 1959–60 Challenge Cup Final during the 1959–60 season at Wembley Stadium, London on Saturday 14 May 1960, and played hooker in the 12–6 victory over Huddersfield in the 1961–62 Challenge Cup Final during the 1961–62 season at Wembley Stadium, London on Saturday 12 May 1962.

=== County Cup Final appearances ===
Oakes played hooker in Wakefield Trinity's 16–10 victory over Huddersfield in the 1960–61 Yorkshire Cup Final during the 1960–61 season at Headingley, Leeds on Saturday 29 October 1960, and played hooker in Warrington's 16–5 victory over Rochdale Hornets in the 1965–66 Lancashire Cup Final during the 1965–66 season at Knowsley Road, St. Helens on Friday 29 October 1965.

=== Club career ===
Oakes, Reg Parker and Harold Poynton made their début for Wakefield Trinity in the 17–12 victory over St. Helens at Belle Vue, Wakefield on Saturday 1 February 1958, he made his début for Warrington on Saturday 21 November 1964, and played his last game for Warrington on Wednesday 28 September 1966.
