= Barry Simms =

GB international rugby league footballer

Personal information
- Full name: Barry Simms
- Born: c. 1939
- Died: 27 June 2020

Playing information
- Position: Hooker
Club
Years	Team	Pld	T	G	FG	P
1957–64	Leeds	142	12	0	0	36
Representative
Years	Team	Pld	T	G	FG	P
1962	Great Britain	1	0	0	0	0

Barry Simms (c. 1939 – 27 June 2020) was a professional rugby league footballer who played in the 1950s and 1960s. He played at representative level for Great Britain, and at club level for Leeds, as a hooker.

== Playing career ==
=== Leeds ===
Barry Simms played hooker in Leeds' 25-10 victory over Warrington in the Championship Final during the 1960–61 season at Odsal Stadium, Bradford on Saturday 20 May 1961, in front of a crowd of 52,177.

Barry Simms played hooker in Leeds' 24-20 victory over Wakefield Trinity in the 1958 Yorkshire Cup Final during the 1958–59 season at Odsal Stadium, Bradford on Saturday 18 October 1958, and played hooker in the 9-19 defeat by Wakefield Trinity in the 1961 Yorkshire Cup Final during the 1961–62 season at Odsal Stadium, Bradford on Saturday 11 November 1961.

His playing career was cut short by a knee injury which forced him to retire in 1964.

=== International honours ===
Barry Simms won a cap for Great Britain while at Leeds in 1962 against France.
