= List of Leeds Rhinos head coaches =

The following is a list of head coaches of Leeds Rhinos Rugby League Football Club and their major honours from the beginning of the club's official managerial records in 1936 to the present day. Each manager's entry includes the dates of his tenure and honours won while under his care. As of 2022 Leeds Rhinos have had 23 full-time coaches as well as 3 intern coaches.

== Statistics ==
- The statistics include all competitive first team fixtures.
- Information correct as of 20 April 2022.

Key

= Intern head coach
P = Matches played; W = Matches won; D = Matches drawn; L = Matches lost;

Name	From	To	P	W	D	L	Win %
(Wales) Dai Prosser	1936	1957					
(England) Joe Warham	1958	1962					
(Wales) Roy Francis	1963	1969	219	139	4	76	63%
(England) Joe Warham	1969	1970					
(England) Derek Turner	1970	1973					
(England) Eric Ashton	1973	1974					
(Wales) Roy Francis	June 1974	May 1975	44	29	1	14	66%
(England) Syd Hynes	June 1975	April 1981					
(England) Robin Dewhurst	June 1981	October 1983					
(England) Maurice Bamford	December 1986	April 1988					
(England) Mal Reilly	August 1988	September 1989					
(England) David Ward	September 1989	May 1991					
(England) Doug Laughton	May 1991	September 1995	153	91	7	55	56%
(New Zealand) Dean Bell	September 1995	September 1997	44	19	1	24	53%
(Australia) Graham Murray	December 1997	October 1999	65	48	1	16	74%
(Australia) Dean Lance	November 1999	April 2001	43	27	0	16	63%
(England) Daryl Powell	April 2001	October 2003	55	32	4	19	58%
(Australia) Tony Smith	November 2003	14 October 2007	134	98	3	33	73%
(New Zealand) Brian McClennan	7 November 2007	25 October 2010	102	73	1	28	66%
(England) Brian McDermott	25 October 2010	2 July 2018	265	162	6	97	61%
(England) Kevin Sinfield (Caretaker)	3 July 2018	5 November 2018	12	6	1	5	50%
(Australia) David Furner	6 November 2018	7 May 2019	15	5	0	10	33%
(England) Richard Agar (Caretaker)	8 May 2019	9 September 2019	15	8	0	7	53%
(England) Richard Agar	9 September 2019	21 March 2022	50	25	0	25	50%
(England) Jamie Jones-Buchanan (Caretaker)	21 March 2022	20 April 2022	4	2	1	3	40%
(Australia) Rohan Smith	20 April 2022	19 June 2024	61	31	0	30	51%
(England) Chev Walker & Scott Grix (Caretakers)	19 June 2024	10 July 2024	0	0	0	0	0%
(Australia) Brad Arthur	10 July 2024	Present	4	2	0	2	50%

== Coaches with honours ==
Name	Tenure	Honours
(Wales) Dai Prosser	1936–1957	Challenge Cup 1940–41, 1941–42, 1957–56
(England) Joe Warham	1958–1962	RFL Championship 1960–61
(Wales) Roy Francis	1963–1969	Challenge Cup 1967–68; RFL Championship 1968–69
(England) Derek Turner	1970–1973	RFL Championship 1971–72
(England) Syd Hynes	1975–1981	Challenge Cup 1976–77, 1977–78
(Australia) Graham Murray	1998–1999	Challenge Cup 1999
(Australia) Tony Smith	2004–2007	Super League 2004, 2007; League Leaders Shield 2004; World Club Challenge 2005
(New Zealand) Brian McClennan	2008–2010	Super League 2008, 2009; League Leaders Shield 2009; World Club Challenge 2008
(England) Brian McDermott	2011–2018	Super League 2011, 2012, 2015, 2017; League Leaders Shield 2015; Challenge Cup 2014, 2015; World Club Challenge 2012
(England) Richard Agar	2019–2022	Challenge Cup 2020
