= Del Hodgkinson =

English rugby league footballer

Personal information
- Full name: Delmas C. Hodgkinson
- Born: c. 1939 Leeds, England
- Died: September 2015 (aged 76) Leeds, England

Playing information
- Position: Wing
Club
Years	Team	Pld	T	G	FG	P
1956–62	Leeds	130	80	0	0	240
Representative
Years	Team	Pld	T	G	FG	P
1958	Yorkshire	1	0	0	0	0

Del Hodgkinson (c. 1939 – September 2015) was an English former professional rugby league footballer who played in the 1950s. He played at club level for Leeds, as a wing.

== Background ==
Hodgkinson's birth was registered in Leeds North district, West Riding of Yorkshire, England.

== Playing career ==
=== Club career ===
Hodgkinson played on the wing, and scored a try in Leeds' 9–7 victory over Barrow in the 1956–57 Challenge Cup Final during the 1956–57 season at Wembley Stadium, London on Saturday 11 May 1957, in front of a crowd of 76,318, he was aged-18 at the time.

Hodgkinson scored six tries in Leeds' 64–17 victory over Huddersfield in the 1958 Yorkshire Cup first round match during the 1958–59 season at Headingley, Leeds on Saturday 30 August 1958.

Hodgkinson played on the wing in Leeds' 24–20 victory over Wakefield Trinity in the 1958 Yorkshire Cup Final during the 1958–59 season at Odsal Stadium, Bradford on Saturday 18 October 1958.

He was forced to retire prematurely from the sport due to a persistent shoulder injury.
