= Geoff Robinson =

Geoff Robinson or Geoffrey Robinson may refer to:

== Sport ==
- Geoff Robinson (cricketer) (1944–2015), English cricketer
- Geoff Robinson (rugby, born 1934) (1934–2011), English rugby union and rugby league footballer
- Geoff Robinson (rugby league, born 1957) (1957–2024), Australian rugby league player
- Geoffrey Robinson (sport shooter), British sports shooter
- INcontroL (1985–2019), stage name of Geoff Robinson, American esports player and commentator

== Other people ==
- Geoff Robinson (broadcaster) (born 1943), British-born New Zealand broadcaster
- Geoff Robinson (sculptor), Australian artist, winner of 2014 Melbourne Prize for Urban Sculpture
- Geoffrey Robinson (bishop) (1937–2020), Roman Catholic Australian Auxiliary Bishop of Sydney
- Geoffrey Robinson (politician) (born 1938), British MP

== See also ==
- Geoffrey Robertson (born 1946), Australian and British barrister
- Jeff Robinson (disambiguation)
