= Albert Firth =

English rugby league footballer

Personal information
- Born: 3 July 1937 Wakefield, England
- Died: 5 January 2015 (aged 77) Osgodby, Scarborough, England

Playing information
- Height: 5 ft 11 in (1.80 m)
- Weight: 14 st 7 lb (92 kg)
- Position: Prop, Second-row
Club
Years	Team	Pld	T	G	FG	P
1953–62	Wakefield Trinity	217	70	0	0	210
1962–64	York
1964–67	Leeds	47	0	0	0	0
	Total	264	70	0	0	210
Representative
Years	Team	Pld	T	G	FG	P
1959–61	Yorkshire	3	0	0	0	0

Albert Firth (3 July 1937 – 5 January 2015), also known by the nickname of "Budgie", was an English professional rugby league footballer who played in the 1950s and 1960s. He played at representative level for Yorkshire, and at club level for Stanley Rangers ARLFC, Wakefield Trinity, York and Leeds, as a prop or second-row.

== Background ==
Albert Firth was born in Wakefield, West Riding of Yorkshire, England, and he died aged 77 in Osgodby, Scarborough, North Yorkshire, England.

== Playing career ==
=== County honours ===
Albert Firth was selected for Yorkshire County XIII whilst at Wakefield Trinity during the 1959/60 season, and in 1961.

=== Championship appearances ===
Albert Firth played at second-row in Wakefield Trinity's 3–27 defeat by Wigan in the Championship Final during the 1959–60 season at Odsal Stadium, Bradford on Saturday 21 May 1960.

=== Challenge Cup Final appearances ===
Albert Firth played at second-row in Wakefield Trinity's 38–5 victory over Hull F.C. in the 1959–60 Challenge Cup Final during the 1959–60 season at Wembley Stadium, London on Saturday 14 May 1960, and played at prop in the 12–6 victory over Huddersfield in the 1961–62 Challenge Cup Final during the 1961–62 season at Wembley Stadium, London on Saturday 12 May 1962.

=== County Cup Final appearances ===
Albert Firth played at second-row in Wakefield Trinity's 16–10 victory over Huddersfield in the 1960–61 Yorkshire Cup Final during the 1960–61 season at Headingley, Leeds on Saturday 29 October 1960, and played at prop in the 19–9 victory over Leeds in the 1961–62 Yorkshire Cup Final during the 1961–62 season at Odsal Stadium, Bradford on Saturday 11 November 1961.

=== Club career ===
Albert Firth made his début for Wakefield Trinity during April 1954, and he played his last match for Wakefield Trinity during the 1962–63 season, he was transferred from Wakefield Trinity to York in December 1962, and he was transferred from York to Leeds in October 1964.

== Contemporaneous Article Extract ==
"Outlines – Albert Firth – Albert is one of many players on our present register who commenced his career as a member of the Wakefield City Schools' side. Unlike the majority, however he had to seek his Rugby League football at that stage, for his school in Stanley did not play Rugby. Whilst with the Wakefield City Schools' team he gained County honours against Cumberland. In those days he played in the forwards; a number of occasions being at loose forward. Schooldays over, he naturally joined his local team – Stanley Rangers – for whom he made several appearances at centre three-quarter. In whichever position he played, however, his work was so successful that Trinity secured his signature at sixteen years of age. Albert signed for Wakefield Trinity in July, 1953 and, after a short period in the "A” team, made his senior début in November 1953 against Huddersfield here at Belle Vue. There was another appearance in the senior team during that season, but in the following campaign he made his mark and from there he has not looked back. In his first full season of 1954–5, he made thirty appearances and scored 13 tries – his most successful term until this present season. In September he made his County début for Yorkshire against Cumberland at Hull and there are strong hopes that this will form only the first of many similar representative appearances. Still only in his early twenties, with 127 first team appearances (and over forty tries) behind him, he still has much to give Trinity in the important seasons ahead. The continuance of his career and the further fulfilment of much promise will be watched with interest and satisfaction"

== Outside of Rugby League ==
He later became a landlord at The Angel Inn, and other pubs in Scarborough, North Yorkshire, England.

== Personal life ==
Albert Firth's first wife Peggy was the eldest sister of Molly who married Stanley Smith, and Lily who married Leslie Chamberlain.
