= Dave Valentine =

GB International rugby league footballer

- Valentine with rugby league's World Cup, 1954

Personal information
- Full name: David Donald Valentine
- Born: 12 September 1926 Hawick, Scottish Borders, Scotland
- Died: 14 August 1976 (aged 49) Leeds, Yorkshire, England

Playing information

Rugby union
- Position: Flanker
Club
| Years | Team | Pld | T | G | FG | P |
|---|---|---|---|---|---|---|
| | Hawick RFC |
Representative
| Years | Team | Pld | T | G | FG | P |
| 1947 | Scotland | 2 | | | | 0 |

Rugby league
- Position: Second-row, Loose forward, Lock
Club
| Years | Team | Pld | T | G | FG | P |
|---|---|---|---|---|---|---|
| 1947–57 | Huddersfield | 356 | | | | 216 |
Representative
| Years | Team | Pld | T | G | FG | P |
| 1948–54 | Great Britain | 15 | 2 | | | 6 |
| 1949–55 | Other Nationalities | 16 | 4 | | | 12 |
| 1949–52 | British Empire XIII | 2 | 1 | | | 3 |
| 1954 | Combined Nationalities | 1 | | | | 0 |

Coaching information
Club
| Years | Team | Gms | W | D | L | W% |
| | Huddersfield |
| 1966–67 | Batley |
| | Total | 0 | 0 | 0 | 0 |
- Source: As of 4 February 2021
- Relatives: Alec Valentine (brother); Rob Valentine (brother)

David Donald Valentine (12 September 1926 – 14 August 1976) was a Scottish representative rugby union and World Cup winning rugby league footballer, a dual-code rugby international who played in the 1940s and 1950s, and coached in the 1960s.

== Rugby union ==
He made his rugby union international début as a flanker for Scotland against Ireland in the 1947 Five Nations Championship, and was also selected in the fixture that year against England.

His younger brother Alec Valentine also played for Scotland, and his younger brother Rob played rugby union for South of Scotland, and later switched to rugby league playing for Great Britain.

In October 1947 Valentine signed to play rugby league with English club Huddersfield, where he would join another five ex-Hawick players.

== Rugby league ==
Valentine's rugby league career was with the Huddersfield club where he played as a loose forward. He played in all three Tests of the 1948–49 victorious Ashes series.

He played for the British Empire XIII versus New Zealand on Wednesday 23 January 1952 at Stamford Bridge, and in the 2nd and 3rd Tests of the 1952 Ashes series.

Dave Valentine played loose forward in Huddersfield's 15-10 victory over St. Helens in the 1952–53 Challenge Cup Final during the 1952-53 season at Wembley Stadium, London on Saturday 25 April 1953, in front of a crowd of 89,588.

In 1954 Valentine was selected for Great Britain's tour of Australia playing in all three Tests. He was also the British squad captain for their successful 1954 Rugby League World Cup campaign, playing in all four matches and hoisting the Cup as the victorious captain following Great Britain's 16-12 victory at Parc des Princes in the Final over France, in front of a huge 31, 000 crowd.

Dave Valentine also represented Great Britain while at Huddersfield between 1952 and 1956 against France (1 non-Test match).

All told he earned eleven Test caps in addition to the four World Cup appearances.

Valentine played loose forward, and was captain in Huddersfield's 4-11 defeat by Bradford Northern in the 1949–50 Yorkshire Cup Final during the 1949–50 season at Headingley Rugby Stadium, Leeds on Saturday 29 October 1949, played loose forward, played loose forward, scored a try, and was captain in the 18-8 victory over Batley in the 1952–53 Yorkshire Cup Final during the 1952–53 season at Headingley Rugby Stadium, Leeds on Saturday 15 November 1952, played loose forward, and was captain in the 15-8 victory over York in the 1957–58 Yorkshire Cup Final during the 1957–58 season at Headingley Rugby Stadium, Leeds on Saturday 19 October 1957, and played loose forward, and was captain in the 10-16 defeat by Wakefield Trinity in the 1960–61 Yorkshire Cup Final during the 1960–61 season at Headingley Rugby Stadium, Leeds on Saturday 29 October 1960.

Valentine's Testimonial match at Huddersfield took place in 1956. He retired in 1957, having made 356 appearances for Huddersfield.

== Coaching career ==
Dave Valentine was the coach in Huddersfield's 6-12 defeat by Wakefield Trinity in the 1961–62 Challenge Cup Final during the 1961–62 season at Wembley Stadium, London on Saturday 12 May 1962, in front of a crowd of 81,263, and was the coach in the 14-5 victory over Wakefield Trinity in the Championship Final during the 1961–62 season at Odsal Stadium, Bradford on Saturday 19 May 1962.

=== Club career ===
Dave Valentine was the coach of Batley from June 1966 to December 1967.

== Post-playing ==
Since 2004, the management of the Scotland national rugby league team have given the Dave Valentine Award to their player of the year.

Arriva Yorkshire honoured 13 rugby league footballers on Thursday 20 August 2009, at a ceremony at Wheldon Road, the home of the Castleford. A fleet of new buses were named after the 'Arriva Yorkshire Rugby League Dream Team'. Members of the public nominated the best ever rugby league footballers to have played in West Yorkshire, supported by local rugby league journalists; James Deighton from BBC Leeds, and Tim Butcher, editor of Rugby League World. The 'Arriva Yorkshire Rugby League Dream Team' is; Trevor Foster MBE, Neil Fox MBE, Albert Goldthorpe, Alan Hardisty, Stan Kielty, Lewis Jones, Roger Millward MBE, Malcolm Reilly, Garry Schofield, Keith Senior, David Topliss, Dave Valentine, and Adrian Vowles.
