= 1961–62 Challenge Cup =

F.noli

- Duration: 5 rounds
- Winners: Wakefield Trinity
- Runners-up: Huddersfield
- Lance Todd Trophy: Neil Fox

The 1961–62 Challenge Cup was the 61st staging of rugby league's oldest knockout competition, the Challenge Cup.

== First round ==
Date	Team one	Score one	Team two	Score two
10 Feb	Barrow	14	Whitehaven	3
10 Feb	Blackpool	18	Liverpool	2
10 Feb	Brookhouse	4	Doncaster	7
10 Feb	Castleford	12	Bradford Northern	0
10 Feb	Dewsbury	5	Halifax	3
10 Feb	Featherstone Rovers	21	Batley	14
10 Feb	Hunslet	53	Oldham St Annes	10
10 Feb	Keighley	3	Wigan	25
10 Feb	Leeds	34	Bramley	6
10 Feb	Oldham	32	Hull FC	16
10 Feb	Salford	2	St Helens	15
10 Feb	Swinton	0	Hull Kingston Rovers	2
10 Feb	Wakefield Trinity	40	Warrington	18
10 Feb	Widnes	3	Leigh	13
10 Feb	Workington Town	14	Rochdale Hornets	2
10 Feb	York	7	Huddersfield	8

== Second round ==
Date	Team one	Score one	Team two	Score two
03 Mar	Blackpool	4	Wakefield Trinity	16
03 Mar	Castleford	27	Hunslet	14
03 Mar	Featherstone Rovers	14	Doncaster	2
03 Mar	Hull Kingston Rovers	14	Barrow	5
03 Mar	Leigh	7	Leeds	7
03 Mar	Oldham	0	Workington Town	5
03 Mar	St Helens	2	Huddersfield	13
03 Mar	Wigan	50	Dewsbury	2
05 Mar	Leeds	16	Leigh	17

== Quarterfinals ==
Date	Team one	Score one	Team two	Score two
24 Mar	Castleford	4	Huddersfield	4
24 Mar	Featherstone Rovers	23	Leigh	9
24 Mar	Wakefield Trinity	5	Wigan	4
24 Mar	Workington Town	3	Hull Kingston Rovers	15
28 Mar	Huddersfield	10	Castleford	4

== Semifinals ==
Date	Team one	Score one	Team two	Score two
11 Apr	Wakefield Trinity	9	Featherstone Rovers	0
14 Apr	Huddersfield	6	Hull Kingston Rovers	0

== Final ==
Wakefield Trinity beat Huddersfield 12-6 in the Challenge Cup Final played at Wembley Stadium before a crowd of 81,263. This was Wakefield Trinity’s third Challenge Cup final win in four Final appearances. Neil Fox, their centre, was awarded the Lance Todd Trophy for his man-of-the-match performance. This has been the only time in a Rugby League Challenge Cup final that a place kick has not been converted. Fox dropped three goals for Wakefield Trinity, then worth two points each.

12 May 1962

Wakefield Trinity	12 – 6	Huddersfield
Try Fox, Hirst; Drop Goals Fox (3)	Report	Try Smales, Ramsden

Wembley, London
Attendance: 81,263
Referee: D T H Davies (Manchester)
Player of the Match: Neil Fox

1	Gerry Round
2	Fred Smith
3	Alan Skene
4	Neil Fox
5	Kenneth Hirst
6	Harold Poynton
7	Keith Holliday
8	Jack Wilkinson
9	Geoff Oakes
10	Albert Firth
11	Brian Briggs
12	Dennis Williamson
13	Derek Turner (c)
Coach:
Ken Traill

1	Frank Dyson
2	Aiden Breen
3	Leo Booth
4	Ray Haywood
5	Mike Wicks
6	Harry Deighton
7	Thomas Smales (c)
8	Ted Slevin
9	Don Close
10	Ken Noble
11	Mick Clark
12	Ken Bowman
13	Peter Ramsden
Coach:
Dave Valentine
