= Dennis Williamson =

English rugby league footballer

Personal information
- Full name: Dennis Williamson
- Born: circa-1939

Playing information
- Height: 6 ft 1 in (185 cm)
- Weight: 15 st 7 lb (98 kg)
- Position: Second-row
Club
Years	Team	Pld	T	G	FG	P
≤1956–≤61	Whitehaven
≤1961–≥62	Wakefield Trinity	23	3	0	0	9
	Total	23	3	0	0	9

Dennis Williamson is a former professional rugby league footballer who played in the 1950s and 1960s. He played at club level for Whitehaven (two spells), and Wakefield Trinity, as a second-row.

== Playing career ==
=== Challenge Cup Final appearances ===
Dennis Williamson played at second-row in Wakefield Trinity’s 12-6 victory over Huddersfield in the 1961–62 Challenge Cup Final during the 1961–62 season at Wembley Stadium, London on Saturday 12 May 1962.
