= Garry Hemingway =

English rugby league footballer

Personal information
- Full name: John Garry Hemingway
- Born: 10 May 1933 Thorne, Doncaster, England
- Died: 13 June 2002 (aged 69) Barrow-in-Furness, England

Playing information

Rugby union
- Position: Wing
Club
Years	Team	Pld	T	G	FG	P
≤1957–57	Old Thornensians RUFC
Representative
Years	Team	Pld	T	G	FG	P
1950	Sheffield and South Yorkshire	≥1
1954	Yorkshire	≥1

Rugby league
- Position: Wing
Club
Years	Team	Pld	T	G	FG	P
1957–62	Leeds	87	82			≥246

John Garry Hemingway (10 May 1933 – 13 June 2002) was an English rugby union, and professional rugby league footballer who played in the 1950s and 1960s. He played representative level rugby union (RU) for Yorkshire and Sheffield and South Yorkshire, and at club level Old Thornensians RUFC (in Thorne, Doncaster), as a wing, and club level rugby league (RL) for Leeds, as a wing.

== Background ==
Garry Hemingway was born in Thorne, Doncaster. He was a pupil at Thorne Grammar School and the English Schools' Athletics Championships long jump champion two years in succession, in 1951 and 1952. He undertook his national service (extended to 3-years) in the Royal Air Force from 1950 to 1953, including at RAF Cosford, Shropshire. He became a Physical Training Instructor (PTI) and in 1954, worked as a temporary (unqualified) teacher at Thorne Secondary Modern School and the Stainforth Secondary Modern School.

In 1955, Hemingway began a 3-year Diploma of Education Teacher Training course at Cheltenham Training College at Francis Close Hall, St. Pauls, Cheltenham (now a campus of the University of Gloucestershire), where he was the college rugby union team's top try-scorer. After 2-years he left the college with Certificate of Education to pursue a professional rugby league career with Leeds. He became a French language and physical education teacher at Kirkstall County Secondary School in Leeds from the 1950s to the 1980s where he taught, amongst others, the future rugby league footballer; John Holmes. In the late-1960s, he coached Yorkshire Schoolboys rugby league team with George Cranage (of Cross Green Secondary Modern School).

Hemingway retired to near Grange-over-Sands close to the Lake District with his wife Shirley. He died aged 69 in Barrow-in-Furness, Cumbria; his funeral took place in Barrow-in-Furness, Cumbria, England.

== Playing career ==
=== Club career ===
Garry Hemingway played in Old Thornensians RUFC's victory in the Yorkshire Shield during the 1951–52 season, he set Old Thornensians RUFC's "most tries scored in a season" record with 30 tries, later extended by his older brother Tom Hemingway with 31 tries, he transferred from rugby union to rugby league during September 1957, he made his début for Leeds against Salford on Saturday 5 October 1957. In the 1959-60 season a knee ligament injury ruled him out for nearly two years, he returned for the 1961-62 season, he scored a try in the pre-1962-63 season Lazenby Cup match against Hunslet on Monday 13 August 1962, but following re-occurrence of the knee injury during the match, he subsequently retired from rugby league.

=== County honours ===
Garry Hemingway represented Yorkshire against Ulster during 1954, and represented Sheffield and South Yorkshire against Derbyshire during 1950.

=== County Cup Final appearances ===
Garry Hemingway played on the wing, and scored two tries in Leeds' 24–20 victory over Wakefield Trinity in the 1958–59 Yorkshire Cup Final during the 1958–59 season at Odsal Stadium, Bradford on Saturday 18 October 1958, and played on the wing, and scored a try in the 9–19 defeat by Wakefield Trinity in the 1961–62 Yorkshire Cup Final during the 1961–62 season at Odsal Stadium, Bradford on Saturday 11 November 1961.
