= 1965–66 Lancashire Cup =

- Structure: Regional knockout championship
- Teams: 14
- Winners: Warrington
- Runners-up: Rochdale Hornets

1965–66 was the fifty-third occasion on which the Lancashire Cup completion had been held.

Warrington won the trophy by beating Rochdale Hornets by the score of 16-5

The match was played at Knowsley Road, Eccleston, St Helens, Merseyside, (historically in the county of Lancashire). The attendance was 21,360 and receipts were £3,800

It would be almost another 20 years before the attendance would again exceed 20,000

== Background ==
The total number of teams entering the competition remained the same at 14.

The same fixture format was retained, and due to the number of clubs this resulted in no bye but one “blank” or “dummy” fixture in the first round, and one bye in the second round

== Competition and results ==
=== Round 1 ===
Involved 7 matches (with no bye but one “blank” fixture) and 14 clubs

Game No	Fixture date	Home team	Score	Away team	Venue	Att	Rec	Notes	Ref
1	Fri 10 Sep 1965	St. Helens	7-8	Swinton	Knowsley Road	14,500			
2	Sat 11 Sep 1965	Blackpool Borough	9-14	Rochdale Hornets	Borough Park				
3	Sat 11 Sep 1965	Leigh	21-7	Liverpool City	Hilton Park				
4	Sat 11 Sep 1965	Oldham	21-14	Barrow	Watersheddings				
5	Sat 11 Sep 1965	Salford	14-5	Workington Town	The Willows				
6	Sat 11 Sep 1965	Widnes	9-12	Warrington	Naughton Park				
7	Sat 11 Sep 1965	Wigan	25-23	Whitehaven	Central Park				
8		blank		blank					

=== Round 2 - Quarter-finals ===
Involved 3 matches (with one bye) and 7 clubs

Game No	Fixture date	Home team	Score	Away team	Venue	Att	Rec	Notes	Ref
1	Wed 15 Sep 1965	Rochdale Hornets	4-0	Swinton	Athletic Grounds				
2	Wed 15 Sep 1965	Salford	5-8	Leigh	The Willows				
3	Thu '16 Sep 1965	Oldham	28-13	Wigan	Watersheddings				
4		Warrington		bye					

=== Round 3 – Semi-finals ===
Involved 2 matches and 4 clubs

Game No	Fixture date	Home team	Score	Away team	Venue	Att	Rec	Notes	Ref
1	Thu 23 Sep 1965	Rochdale Hornets	19-0	Leigh	Athletic Grounds				
2	Wed 06 Oct 1965	Warrington	21-10	Oldham	Wilderspool				

=== Final ===
Game No	Fixture date	Home team	Score	Away team	Venue	Att	Rec	Notes	Ref
	Friday 29 October 1965	Warrington	16-5	Rochdale Hornets	Knowsley Road	21,360	£3,800	1	

==== Teams and scorers ====
Warrington	№	Rochdale Hornets
	Teams	
Geoff Bootle	1	Roy Pritchard
Ray Fisher	2	Tony Pratt
Joe Pickavance	3	Graham Starkey
Jackie Melling	4	J Chamberlain
Brian Glover	5	Gerry Unsworth
Willie Aspinall	6	M Garforth
John Smith	7	Johnny Fishwick
Bill Payne	8	Peter Birchall
Geoff Oakes	9	Kevin Ashcroft
Charlie Winslade	10	Stan Owen
Geoff Robinson	11	Ken Parr
Mal Thomas	12	Apisai Toga
Bill Hayes	13	Mick Baxter
	14	Voate Drui (for Parr)
	15	
16	score	5
10	HT	5
	Scorers	
	Tries	
Jackie Melling (2)	T	Graham Starkey
Brian Glover (1)	T	
Ray Fisher (1)	T	
	Goals	
Geoff Bootle (2)	G	Graham Starkey (2)
	Drop Goals	
	DG	
Referee		Eric Clay (Rothwell)

Scoring - Try = three (3) points - Goal = two (2) points - Drop goal = two (2) points

=== The road to success ===
First round
Widnes	9
Warrington	12
blank
blank
Oldham	21
Barrow	14
Wigan	25
Whitehaven	23
Blackpool Borough	9
Rochdale Hornets	14
St. Helens	7
Swinton	8
Salford	14
Workington Town	5
Leigh	21
Liverpool City	7

Second round
Warrington
bye
Oldham	28
Wigan	13
Rochdale Hornets	4
Swinton	0
Salford	5
Leigh	8

Semi-finals
Warrington	21
Oldham	10
Rochdale Hornets	19
Leigh	0

Final
Warrington	16
Rochdale Hornets	5

== Notes and comments ==
1 * Knowsley Road was the home ground of St. Helens from 1890 to 2010. The final capacity was in the region of 18,000, although the actual record attendance was 35,695, set on 26 December 1949, for a league game between St Helens and Wigan

== See also ==
- 1965–66 Northern Rugby Football League season
- Rugby league county cups
