= Alec Valentine =

Scottish international rugby union player (1928–1997)

Personal information
- Nationality: British (Scottish)
- Born: 5 February 1928 Hawick, Scotland
- Died: 11 May 1997 (aged 69)

Rugby union career
International career
Years	Team	Apps	(Points)
1953	Scotland	3	(0)

Sport
- Sport: rugby union / athletics
- Event: Hammer throw
- Club: Hawick

Alec Richard Valentine (5 February 1928 – 11 May 1997) was a Scottish international rugby union player and hammer thrower.

== Biography ==
He was born in Hawick and came from a sporting family. Valentine was capped three times for Scotland in 1953, playing Flanker. He also played for RNAS Anthorn, and the Royal Navy, captaining the side.

Valentine finished second behind József Csermák in the hammer throw event at the 1954 AAA Championships but because he was the highest placed British athlete, he was considered the British champion.

He represented the Scottish team at the 1954 British Empire and Commonwealth Games in Vancouver, Canada, where he participated in the hammer throw event.

Four years later, he represented the Scottish Empire and Commonwealth Games team again at the 1958 British Empire Games in Cardiff, Wales, participating in one event, the hammer throw.

== Family ==
His older brother Dave was also capped for Scotland, and his youngest brother Rob Valentine was capped for South of Scotland both brothers were subsequently capped at rugby league for Great Britain.
