= Don Close =

GB international rugby league player (1937-1998)

Donald Close

Personal information
- Full name: Donald Close
- Born: c. 1937
- Died: c. 1998 (aged c. 60–61)

Playing information
- Height: 5 ft 9 in (1.75 m)
- Weight: 14 st 12 lb (94 kg)
- Position: Hooker
Club
Years	Team	Pld	T	G	FG	P
1957–≥68	Huddersfield	407	7	0	0	21
Representative
Years	Team	Pld	T	G	FG	P
	Yorkshire
1967	Great Britain	1	0	0	0	0

Donald Close (c. 1937 – c. 1998) was a professional rugby league footballer who played as a hooker in the 1950s and 1960s.

He played at representative level for Great Britain and Yorkshire, and at club level for Leeds), and Huddersfield.

== Background ==
Close worked as a coal miner.

== Playing career ==
=== International honours ===
Close won a cap for Great Britain while at Huddersfield in 1967 against France.

=== County honours ===
Close won cap(s) for Yorkshire while at Huddersfield.

=== Challenge Cup Final appearances ===
Close played hooker in Huddersfield's 6-12 defeat by Wakefield Trinity in the 1961–62 Challenge Cup Final during the 1961–62 season at Wembley Stadium, London on Saturday 12 May 1962, in front of a crowd of 81,263.

=== County Cup Final appearances ===
Close played hooker in Huddersfield's 10-16 defeat by Wakefield Trinity in the 1960–61 Yorkshire Cup Final during the 1960–61 season at Headingley, Leeds on Saturday, 29 October 1960.

=== Testimonial match ===
Close's Testimonial match at Huddersfield took place in 1968.
