= Jeff Robinson =

Jeff Robinson may refer to:

- Jeff Robinson (basketball) (born 1988), American basketball player
- Jeff Robinson (Siena basketball) (born 1969/1970), American basketball player
- Jeff Robinson (relief pitcher) (born 1960), American baseball player
- Jeff Robinson (starting pitcher) (1961–2014), American baseball player
- Jeff Robinson (American football) (born 1970), National Football League Long snapper
- Jeffrey Robinson (born 1945), author

== See also ==
- Geoffrey Robinson (disambiguation)
