= Jack Lendill =

English rugby league footballer

Personal information
- Full name: Jack Lendill
- Born: 2 February 1934; Leeds, England
- Died: November 2021 (aged 87)

Playing information
- Position: Centre, Stand-off
Club
| Years | Team | Pld | T | G | FG | P |
|---|---|---|---|---|---|---|
| 1954–59 | Leeds | 101 | 18 | 0 | 0 | 54 |

Jack Lendill (2 February 1934 – November 2021) was an English professional rugby league footballer who played in the 1950s. He played at club level for Leeds, as a centre or stand-off.

== Background ==
Lendill was born in Leeds, West Riding of Yorkshire, England.

== Playing career ==
=== Challenge Cup Final appearances ===
Lendill played stand-off in Leeds' 9-7 victory over Barrow in the 1956–57 Challenge Cup Final during the 1956–57 season at Wembley Stadium, London on Saturday 11 May 1957, in front of a crowd of 76,318.

=== Club career ===
Lendill made his début for Leeds against Bradford Northern on Saturday 23 January 1954, he scored a game-changing try just before half-time in the 16-10 victory over Halifax during the 1956–57 Challenge Cup quarter-final match at Thrum Hall, Halifax on Saturday 9 March 1957, his last try for Leeds came against Hunslet in 1959.

== Personal life ==
Jack Lendill is the older brother of the rugby league footballer who played in the 1950s for Leeds, Peter Lendill.
