= 1960–61 Yorkshire Cup =

- Structure: Regional knockout championship
- Teams: 16
- Winners: Wakefield Trinity
- Runners-up: Huddersfield

The 1960–61 Yorkshire Cup was the fifty-third occasion on which the Yorkshire Cup competition was held.

Wakefield Trinity won the trophy by beating Huddersfield by a score of 16–10 in the final played at Headingley, Leeds, now in West Yorkshire. The attendance for this match was 17,456, and receipts were £2,937. This was Wakefield Trinity's first of two consecutive triumphs and the club's third appearance out of five in a period of nine years (which included four as cup winners and one as runner-up).

== Background ==
This season, there were no junior/amateur clubs taking part, no new entrants and no "leavers". Therefore, the total of entries remained the same at sixteen. This in turn resulted in no byes in the first round.

== Competition and results ==
=== Round 1 ===
Involved 8 matches (with no byes) and 16 clubs.

Game No	Fixture date	Home team	Score	Away team	Venue	Att	Rec	Notes	Ref
1	Fri 26 Aug 1960	Bramley	10–7	Hull Kingston Rovers	Barley Mow				
2	Fri 26 Aug 1960	Dewsbury	14–2	York	Crown Flatt				
3	Sat 27 Aug 1960	Batley	2–20	Huddersfield	Mount Pleasant	2,000			
4	Sat 27 Aug 1960	Bradford Northern	7–25	Castleford	Odsal				
5	Sat 27 Aug 1960	Featherstone Rovers	36–10	Doncaster	Post Office Road				
6	Sat 27 Aug 1960	Keighley	18–15	Hull F.C.	Lawkholme Lane				
7	Sat 27 Aug 1960	Leeds	16–0	Hunslet	Headingley				
8	Sat 27 Aug 1960	Wakefield Trinity	3–0	Halifax	Belle Vue				

=== Round 2 - quarterfinals ===
Involved 4 matches and 8 clubs.

Game No	Fixture date	Home team	Score	Away team	Venue	Att	Rec	Notes	Ref
1	Tue 6 Sep 1960	Dewsbury	13–13	Leeds	Crown Flatt				
2	Tue 6 Sep 1960	Keighley	5–3	Featherstone Rovers	Lawkholme Lane				
3	Wed 7 Sep 1960	Huddersfield	15–3	Castleford	Fartown	3,656			
4	Wed 7 Sep 1960	Wakefield Trinity	40–6	Bramley	Belle Vue				

=== Round 2 - replays ===
Involved 1 match and 2 clubs.

Game No	Fixture date	Home team	Score	Away team	Venue	Att	Rec	Notes	Ref
R	Mon 12 Sep 1960	Leeds	22–16	Dewsbury	Headingley				

=== Round 3 – semifinals ===
Involved 2 matches and 4 clubs.

Game No	Fixture date	Home team	Score	Away team	Venue	Att	Rec	Notes	Ref
1	Fri 7 Oct 1960	Leeds	9–12	Huddersfield	Headingley	7,478			
2	Wed 12 Oct 1960	Keighley	4–5	Wakefield Trinity	Odsal			(Note: Keighley opted to play the match at Odsal in the hope of a possibly larger attendance and gate receipts)	

=== Final ===
Game No	Fixture date	Home team	Score	Away team	Venue	Att	Rec	Notes	Ref
	Saturday 29 October 1960	Wakefield Trinity	16–10	Huddersfield	Headingley	17,456	£2,937	(Note: This was Huddersfield's 20th appearance, Wakefield's 14th - in a Yorkshire Cup final) (Note: The attendance is given as 17,629 by the official Huddersfield 1961 Yearbook but given as 17,629 by "100 Years of Rugby. The History of Wakefield Trinity 1873-1973" and 17,456 by RUGBYLEAGUEproject and by the Rothmans Rugby League Yearbook of 1991-92 and 1990-91) (Note: The receipts are quoted as £2,936 by "100 Years of Rugby. The History of Wakefield Trinity 1873-1973" but £2,937 in the Rothmans Rugby League Yearbook of 1991-92 and 1990-91) (Note: Headingley, Leeds, is the home ground of Leeds RLFC with a capacity of 21,000. The record attendance was 40,175 for a league match between Leeds and Bradford Northern on 21 May 1947.)	

==== Teams and scorers ====
Wakefield Trinity	№	Huddersfield
	teams	
Donald Metcalfe	1	Frank Dyson
Fred Smith	2	Aidan Brown
Alan Skene	3	Brian Curry
Neil Fox	4	Ernie Ashcroft (c)
John Etty	5	Aidan Breen
Harold Poynton	6	Don Lockwood
Ken Rollin	7	Thomas Smales
Jack Wilkinson	8	Ted Slevin
Geoff Oakes	9	Don Close
Leslie "Les" Chamberlain	10	Ken Noble
Brian Briggs	11	Don Devereux
Albert Firth	12	Ken Bowman
Derek "Rocky" Turner (c)	13	Dave Valentine
Ken Traill	Coach	Ernie Ashcroft
16	score	10
10	HT	3
	Scorers	
	Tries	
Neil Fox (2)	T	Aidan Breen (1)
John Etty (1)	T	Don Lockwood (1)
Fred Smith (1)	T	
	Goals	
Neil Fox (2)	G	Frank Dyson (2)
Referee		Norman T. Railton (Wigan)

Scoring - Try = three (3) points - Goal = two (2) points - Drop goal = two (2) points

=== The road to success ===
First round
Keighley	18
Hull F.C.	15
Featherstone Rovers	36
Doncaster	10
Wakefield Trinity	3
Halifax	0
Bramley	10
Hull Kingston Rovers	7
Dewsbury	14
York	2
Leeds	16
Hunslet	0
Batley	2
Huddersfield	20
Bradford Northern	7
Castleford	25

Second round
Keighley	5
Featherstone Rovers	3
Wakefield Trinity	40
Bramley	6
Dewsbury	13 (16)
Leeds	13 (22)
Huddersfield	15
Castleford	3

Semifinals
Keighley	4
Wakefield Trinity	5
Leeds	9
Huddersfield	12

Final
Wakefield Trinity	16
Huddersfield	10

== See also ==
- 1960–61 Northern Rugby Football League season
- Rugby league county cups
