= Wilfred Adams =

English rugby league footballer

Wilf Adams
Personal information
- Full name: Wilfred Adams
- Born: second quarter of 1934 Pontefract district, England
- Died: circa 2001 (aged 66–67) Wakefield

Playing information
- Height: 6 ft 4 in (1.93 m)
- Weight: 20 st 0 lb (127.0 kg; 280.0 lb)
- Position: Prop
Club
| Years | Team | Pld | T | G | FG | P |
|---|---|---|---|---|---|---|
| <1951–51 | Streethouse Intermediates |
| 1951–60 | Wakefield Trinity | 67 | 6 | 0 | 0 | 18 |
| | Total | 67 | 6 | 0 | 0 | 18 |

Wilfred "Wilf" Adams (birth registered second quarter of 1934 – c. 2001) was an English professional rugby league footballer who played in the 1950s and 1960s. He played at club level for Streethouse Intermediates, and Wakefield Trinity, as a prop.

== Background ==
Wilf Adams' birth was registered in Pontefract district, West Riding of Yorkshire, England, and he died aged c. 66–67 in his sleep while at home in Wakefield, West Yorkshire, England.

== Playing career ==
=== County Cup Final appearances ===
Wilf Adams played at prop in Wakefield Trinity's 20-14 defeat by Leeds in the 1958 Yorkshire Cup Final during the 1958–59 season at Odsal Stadium, Bradford on Saturday 18 October 1958.

=== Contemporaneous Article Extract ===
"Wilf Adams - Blind-side prop: Could be the choice to step into the injured Malcolm Sampson's role at No. 10. Signed from Streethouse Intermediates 1951. Regular choice during '53/4 and '58/9 seasons, but had only made six senior appearances (this season) when Trinity recalled him for the last league match ten days ago after successful work in the Reserves"
