= Frank Dyson =

GB international rugby league footballer & coach

Personal information
- Born: 14 March 1931; Huddersfield, England
- Died: 31 October 1979 (aged 48)

Playing information
- Height: 5 ft 9 in (175 cm)
- Weight: 13 st 4 lb (84 kg; 186 lb)
- Position: Fullback
Club
Years	Team	Pld	T	G	FG	P
1949–63	Huddersfield	367	52	958		2072
1963–65	Oldham	60	7	206		433
	Total	427	59	1164	0	2505
Representative
Years	Team	Pld	T	G	FG	P
	Yorkshire
1959	Great Britain	1	0	0	0	0

Coaching information
Club
Years	Team	Gms	W	D	L	W%
196?–6?	Oldham RLFC	0	0	0	0

Frank Dyson (14 March 1931 – 31 October 1979), also known by the nickname of "Spanky", was an English professional rugby league footballer who played in the 1950s and 1960s, and coached in the 1960s. He played at representative level for Great Britain and Yorkshire, and at club level for Huddersfield and Oldham, as a prolific left-footed goal-kicking fullback, and he coached at club level for Oldham.

== Background ==
Dyson was born in Huddersfield, West Riding of Yorkshire, following his retirement from rugby, he was the landlord of The Harp public house on Bradford Road in Fartown during the 1960s, and 1970s, and he died aged 48.

== Playing career ==
Dyson made his début for Huddersfield in 1949. His testimonial match for the club took place in 1959. Later that year, during the 1959–60 Kangaroo tour, he won his only cap for Great Britain in the 11-10 victory over Australia at Headingley Rugby Stadium, Leeds on Saturday 21 November 1959, in front of a crowd of 30,301.

Dyson won cap(s) for Yorkshire while at Huddersfield.

Dyson played fullback in Huddersfield's 6-12 defeat by Wakefield Trinity in the 1961–62 Challenge Cup Final during the 1961–62 season at Wembley Stadium, London on Saturday 12 May 1962, in front of a crowd of 81,263. He also played at fullback in Huddersfield's 14-5 victory over Wakefield Trinity in the Championship Final during the 1961–62 season at Odsal Stadium, Bradford on Saturday 19 May 1962. With 2,072 points, he became Huddersfield's record point scorer.

Dyson played fullback, and scored 3-conversions in Huddersfield's 15-8 victory over York in the 1957–58 Yorkshire Cup Final during the 1957–58 season at Headingley Rugby Stadium, Leeds on 19 October 1957, and played fullback, and scored 2 conversions in the 10-16 defeat by Wakefield Trinity in the 1960–61 Yorkshire Cup Final during the 1960–61 season at Headingley Rugby Stadium, Leeds on 29 October 1960.

Dyson left Huddersfield in 1963 and joined Oldham, scoring 7-tries and 206 conversions in two seasons at the club.
