= Alan Skene =

South Africa dual-code rugby international footballer

Alan Leslie Skene
Personal information
- Full name: Alan Leslie Skene
- Born: 2 October 1932 Cape Town, South Africa
- Died: 13 August 2001 (aged 68) George, Western Cape, South Africa

Playing information
- Height: 5 ft 10.5 in (179 cm)
- Weight: 11 st 4 lb (72 kg; 158 lb)

Rugby union
- Position: Centre
Club
Years	Team	Pld	T	G	FG	P
1958	Western Province
Representative
Years	Team	Pld	T	G	FG	P
1958	South Africa	1	0	0	0	0

Rugby league
- Position: Centre, Stand-off
Club
Years	Team	Pld	T	G	FG	P
1958–63	Wakefield Trinity	136	69	0	0	207
1963	South Sydney	16	2	0	0	6
	Total	152	71	0	0	213
Representative
Years	Team	Pld	T	G	FG	P
1961–62	Rugby League XIII	2	2	0	0	6
1963	South Africa	≥2

Alan Leslie Skene (2 October 1932 – 13 August 2001) was a South African dual-code international rugby union, and professional rugby league footballer who played in the 1950s and 1960s. He played representative level rugby union for South Africa, and at provincial level for Western Province, as a centre, and representative level rugby league for South Africa and Rugby League XIII, and at club level for Wakefield Trinity, and South Sydney Rabbitohs, as a centre, or stand-off.

== Background ==
Alan Skene was born in Cape Town, South Africa, he was a pupil at Muizenberg High School in Muizenberg, and he died aged 68 in George, Western Cape, South Africa.

== Rugby union ==
Alan Skene won a cap for South Africa while at Western Province playing inside centre against France at Ellis Park Stadium, Johannesburg on 16 August 1958.

== Rugby league ==
=== Club career ===
Alan Skene made his début for Wakefield Trinity, alongside fellow South African Jan Lotriet, in the 19–7 victory over Castleford at Wheldon Road, Castleford on Thursday 25 December 1958.

Skene played at centre in Wakefield Trinity's 3–27 defeat by Wigan in the Championship Final during the 1959–60 season at Odsal Stadium, Bradford on Saturday 21 May 1960. He also played at centre, and scored two tries in Wakefield Trinity's 38–5 victory over Hull F.C. in the 1959–60 Challenge Cup Final at Wembley Stadium, London on Saturday 14 May 1960, and played at centre in the 12–6 victory over Huddersfield in the 1961–62 Challenge Cup Final during the 1961–62 season at Wembley Stadium, London on Saturday 12 May 1962.

Skene played at centre in Wakefield Trinity's 16–10 victory over Huddersfield in the 1960–61 Yorkshire Cup Final during the 1960–61 season at Headingley, Leeds on Saturday 29 October 1960, and played at centre, and scored a try in the 19–9 victory over Leeds in the 1961–62 Yorkshire Cup Final during the 1961–62 season at Odsal Stadium, Bradford on Saturday 11 November 1961.

In 1963, Skene played for Australian club, South Sydney.

=== Representative honours ===
Skene represented Rugby League XIII while at Wakefield Trinity, and won caps for South Africa while at Wakefield Trinity in 1963 against Australia (2 matches).
