= Geoff Robinson (rugby, born 1934) =

English rugby footballer

Personal information
- Full name: Geoffrey Robinson
- Born: fourth ¼ 1934 Wigton district, England
- Died: 15 December 2011 (aged 77)

Playing information

Rugby union
Club
| Years | Team | Pld | T | G | FG | P |
|---|---|---|---|---|---|---|
| ≤1952–≤52 | Workington RFC |
Representative
| Years | Team | Pld | T | G | FG | P |
| ≤1958–≥58 | Cumberland & Westmorland |

Rugby league
- Position: Loose forward
Club
| Years | Team | Pld | T | G | FG | P |
|---|---|---|---|---|---|---|
| –59 | Whitehaven |
| 1959–65 | Oldham | 177 | 20 | | | 60 |
| 1965–66 | Warrington | 37 | 3 | 0 | 0 | 9 |
| | Total | 214 | 23 | 0 | 0 | 69 |
Representative
| Years | Team | Pld | T | G | FG | P |
| 1956–62 | Cumberland | 5 | 3 | 0 | 0 | 9 |

Geoffrey Robinson (December 1934 – 15 December 2011) was an English rugby union, and professional rugby league footballer who played in the 1950s and 1960s. He played representative level rugby union (RU) for Cumberland & Westmorland, and at club level for Workington RFC, and representative level rugby league (RL) for Cumberland, and at club level for Whitehaven and Oldham and Warrington, as a loose forward.

== Background ==
Geoffrey Robinson's birth was registered in Wigton district, Cumberland, England, and he died aged 77.

== Playing career ==
=== County honours ===
Geoff Robinson represented Cumberland & Westmorland (RU) while at Workington RFC, and represented Cumberland (RL) while at Whitehaven.

=== County Cup Final appearances ===
Geoff Robinson played at second-row in Warrington's 16–5 victory over Rochdale Hornets in the 1965 Lancashire Cup Final during the 1965–66 season at Knowsley Road, St. Helens on Friday 29 October 1965.

=== Notable tour matches ===
Geoff Robinson played loose forward in Whitehaven's 14–11 victory over Australia in the 1956–57 Kangaroo tour of Great Britain and France match at the Recreation Ground, Whitehaven on Saturday 20 October 1956, in front of a crowd of 10,917.

=== Club career ===
Geoff Robinson played loose forward in Whitehaven's defeat by Leeds in the 1957 Challenge Cup semi-final during the 1956–57 season at Odsal Stadium, Bradford, he was transferred from Whitehaven to Oldham in 1959 for £9,000 (based on increases in average earnings, this would be approximately £532,700 in 2014).

== Honoured at Whitehaven ==
Geoff Robinson is a Whitehaven Hall of Fame Inductee.
