= Fred Smith (rugby league, born 1935) =

English rugby league footballer (1935–2004)

Personal information
- Full name: Fred Smith
- Born: April–June 1935; Gorton, Manchester, England
- Died: 24 April 2004 (aged 69); Wakefield, England

Playing information
- Height: 5 ft 9.5 in (177 cm)
- Weight: 11 st 2 lb (71 kg)
- Position: Wing
Club
Years	Team	Pld	T	G	FG	P
≤1956–56	Leeds
1956–65	Wakefield Trinity	267	188	0	0	564
	Total	267	188	0	0	564
Representative
Years	Team	Pld	T	G	FG	P
≤1961–≥62	Yorkshire	5	≥2	≥0	≥0	≥6

Fred "Freddy" Smith (birth registered second quarter 1935 – 24 April 2004) was an English professional rugby league footballer who played in the 1950s and 1960s. He played at representative level for Yorkshire (despite being born in Lancashire), and at club level for Leeds and Wakefield Trinity, as a wing.

== Background ==
Smith was born in Gorton, Manchester, Lancashire, England, and he died in Wakefield, West Yorkshire, England.

== Playing career ==
=== International honours ===
Fred Smith was a non-playing substitute for Great Britain while at Wakefield Trinity.

=== County honours ===
Fred Smith represented Yorkshire (despite being born in Lancashire) while at Wakefield Trinity.

=== Championship final appearances ===
Fred Smith played on the wing, and scored a try in Wakefield Trinity's 3–27 defeat by Wigan in the Rugby Football League Championship Final during the 1959–60 season at Odsal Stadium, Bradford on Saturday 21 May 1960.

=== Challenge Cup Final appearances ===
Fred Smith played on the wing, and scored a try in Wakefield Trinity's 38–5 victory over Hull F.C. in the 1959–60 Challenge Cup Final during the 1959–60 season at Wembley Stadium, London on Saturday 14 May 1960, and played in the 12–6 victory over Huddersfield in the 1961–62 Challenge Cup Final during the 1961–62 season at Wembley Stadium, London on Saturday 12 May 1962.

=== County Cup Final appearances ===
Fred Smith played on the wing, and scored 2-tries in Wakefield Trinity's 25–3 victory over Hunslet in the 1956–57 Yorkshire Cup Final during the 1956–57 season at Headingley, Leeds on Saturday 20 October 1956, played on the wing in the 20–24 defeat by Leeds in the 1958–59 Yorkshire Cup Final during the 1958–59 season at Odsal Stadium, Bradford on Saturday 18 October 1958, played on the wing, and scored a try in the 16–10 victory over Huddersfield in the 1960–61 Yorkshire Cup Final during the 1960–61 season at Headingley, Leeds on Saturday 29 October 1960, and played on the wing, and scored a try in the 19–9 victory over Leeds in the 1961–62 Yorkshire Cup Final during the 1961–62 season at Odsal Stadium, Bradford on Saturday 11 November 1961.

=== Notable tour matches ===
Fred Smith played on the wing in Wakefield Trinity's 17–12 victory over Australia in the 1956–57 Kangaroo tour of Great Britain and France match at Belle Vue, Wakefield on Monday 10 December 1956.

=== Transfer from Leeds to Wakefield Trinity ===
Fred Smith was transferred from Leeds to Wakefield Trinity in January 1956, with Don Robinson going the other way. In addition, Wakefield Trinity also received £3,000 (based on increases in average earnings, this would be approximately £155,300 in 2013).

=== Career records ===
Fred Smith's record for the most tries for Wakefield Trinity in a match set against Keighley in 1959 with 7-tries has since been equalled by Keith Slater in 1971, and the record for the most tries for Wakefield Trinity in a season set during the 1959–60 season with 38-tries has since been equalled by David Smith in the 1973–74 season, but over fifty years on, both of Fred Smith's records for Wakefield Trinity remain unbeaten.

== Contemporaneous article extract ==
"Fred Smith: When Don Robinson moved to Leeds in January 1956, Fred Smith came to Belle Vue as part of the transfer agreement. In his first full season of 1956/57 he scored 30 tries – only one other player had ever scored more for the club. In 1958/59 he extended Denis Boocker's and Neil Fox's joint record to 37 and in 1959/60 took his seasons total to 38. Also holds the record of tries in a match – seven against Keighley in 1958/9".
