= Les Chamberlain =

English rugby league footballer

Personal information
- Full name: Leslie Chamberlain
- Born: 10 February 1934 Leeds North district, England
- Died: 2 March 2015 (aged 81) Leeds, England

Playing information
- Position: Prop, Second-row, Loose forward
Club
Years	Team	Pld	T	G	FG	P
1955–61	Wakefield Trinity	110	14	0	0	42
1961–63	Bramley
1963–63	Hull Kingston Rovers	22	2	0	0	6
1963–68	Leeds	107	6	0	0	18
	Total	239	22	0	0	66

Leslie Chamberlain (10 February 1934 – 2 March 2015) was an English professional rugby league footballer who played in the 1950s and 1960s. He played at club level for Wakefield Trinity, Bramley, Hull Kingston Rovers and Leeds, as a prop, second-row, or loose forward.

== Background ==
Les Chamberlain's birth was registered in Leeds North district, West Riding of Yorkshire, England, and he died aged 81 in Leeds, West Yorkshire, England.

== Playing career ==
=== Championship final appearances ===
Les Chamberlain played at second-row in Wakefield Trinity's 3–27 defeat by Wigan in the Championship Final during the 1959–60 season at Odsal Stadium, Bradford on Saturday 21 May 1960.

=== County League appearances ===
Les Chamberlain played in Wakefield Trinity's victories in Yorkshire League during the 1958–59 season and 1959–60 season.

=== Challenge Cup Final appearances ===
Les Chamberlain played at second-row (replacing the injured Malcolm Sampson) in the 38–5 victory over Hull F.C. in the 1959–60 Challenge Cup Final during the 1959–60 season at Wembley Stadium, London on Saturday 14 May 1960.

=== County Cup Final appearances ===
Les Chamberlain played loose forward in Wakefield Trinity's 23–5 victory over Hunslet in the 1956–57 Yorkshire Cup Final during the 1956–57 season at Headingley, Leeds on Saturday 20 October 1956, played at second-row in the 20–14 defeat by Leeds in the 1958–59 Yorkshire Cup Final during the 1958–59 season at Odsal Stadium, Bradford on Saturday 18 October 1958, played at prop in the 16–10 victory over Huddersfield in the 1960–61 Yorkshire Cup Final during the 1960–61 season at Headingley, Leeds on Saturday 29 October 1960, and played second-row in Leeds 2–18 defeat by Wakefield Trinity in the 1964–65 Yorkshire Cup Final during the 1964–64 season at Fartown Ground, Huddersfield on Saturday 31 October 1964.

=== Notable tour matches ===
Les Chamberlain played loose forward, in Wakefield Trinity's 17–12 victory over Australia in the 1956–57 Kangaroo tour of Great Britain and France match at Belle Vue, Wakefield on Monday 10 December 1956.

=== Club career ===
Les Chamberlain made his début for Wakefield Trinity playing loose forward in the 20–8 victory over Dewsbury at Belle Vue, Wakefield on Saturday 24 December 1955, scored two tries against Huddersfield at Belle Vue, Wakefield during Easter 1956, and played for the 'A' Team when they won a League and Cup double during the 1955–56 season, he was being considered for Yorkshire when he suffered a broken leg against Workington Town Saturday 18 October 1958, he made his return a year later against Batley in October 1959, he played his last match for Wakefield Trinity in the 8–15 defeat by Leeds at Belle Vue, Wakefield on Saturday 29 April 1961, and made his début for Leeds against Widnes at Naughton Park, Widnes on Saturday 7 December 1963.

== Contemporaneous Article Extract ==
"Les Chamberlain, a product of Leeds and District Amateur R.L., made his senior début in December 1955. He played regularly at loose forward, and in the second-row, appearing in Trinity's Yorkshire Cup Final teams of 1956 and 1958. A broken leg halted his career in October, 1958 and he took no part in senior football during the following season. He came back into our pack in October, 1959, and played in our Wembley side and also in the N.R.L. Championship Final. Last season, mainly at prop forward, he made 25 appearances. His full playing record with us is:- Appearances 110. Tries 14. Points 42."

== Personal life ==
Les Chamberlain's wife Lily was the youngest sister of Molly who married Stanley Smith, and Peggy who married Albert Firth.
