= Jeff Stevenson (rugby league) =

Former GB international rugby league footballer

Personal information
- Full name: Jeffrey M. Stevenson
- Born: 15 May 1932 Meanwood, Leeds, England
- Died: 13 October 2007 (aged 75) York, England

Playing information
- Height: 5 ft 5 in (1.65 m)
- Weight: 9 st 10 lb (62 kg)
- Position: Scrum-half
Club
Years	Team	Pld	T	G	FG	P
1952–59	Leeds	228	67	0	0	201
1959–62	York	95	25	1	0	77
1962–64	Hunslet
	Total	323	92	1	0	278
Representative
Years	Team	Pld	T	G	FG	P
1956–58	Rugby League XIII	3	1	0	0	3
1957	Great Britain & France	1	0	0	0	0
1955–60	Great Britain	20	5	0	0	15

Jeff Stevenson (15 May 1932 – 13 October 2007) was an English professional rugby league footballer who played in the 1950s and 1960s. He played at representative level for Great Britain, Great Britain & France and Rugby League XIII, and at club level for Leeds, York and Hunslet, as a scrum-half.

== Background ==
Jeffrey Murray Stevenson was born in Meanwood, Leeds, West Riding of Yorkshire, England. The youngest of seven children born to Harold and Kate, he attended Buslingthorpe School on Meanwood Road and went on to join the RAF. From his first marriage he had two daughters Beverley and Tracey and was a well–liked Publican running the Anchor Inn Hunslet, The Fox and finally The Burtonstone in York. Jeff remarried and settled in his adopted city of York. He died from lung cancer in 2007 aged 75 in York, North Yorkshire, England.

== Playing career ==
=== Club career ===
Stevenson played scrum-half, and was man of the match winning the Lance Todd Trophy in Leeds' 9–7 victory over Barrow in the 1957 Challenge Cup Final during the 1956–57 season at Wembley Stadium, London on 11 May 1957, in front of a crowd of 76,318.

Stevenson played scrum-half in Leeds', 24–20 victory over Wakefield Trinity in the 1958 Yorkshire Cup Final during the 1958–59 season at Odsal Stadium, Bradford, on Saturday 25 October 1958, and played scrum-half in Hunslet's 12–2 victory over Hull Kingston Rovers in the 1962 Yorkshire Cup Final during the 1962–63 season at Headingley, Leeds on Saturday 27 October 1962.

=== International honours ===
Stevenson represented Great Britain & France in the 37-31 victory over New Zealand at Carlaw Park, Auckland on 3 July 1957, won caps for Great Britain while at Leeds in 1955 against New Zealand (3 matches), in 1956 against Australia (3 matches), in 1957 against France (3 matches), in the 1957 Rugby League World Cup against France (1-try), Australia, New Zealand, in 1957 against France (2 matches), in 1958 against France, while at York in 1959 against Australia (2 matches), in 1960 against France (2 matches).

Stevenson also represented Great Britain while at Leeds between 1952 and 1956 against France (1 non-Test match).

Stevenson played scrum-half for Rugby League XIII while at Leeds in the 8-26 defeat by France on Saturday 22 November 1958 at Knowsley Road, St. Helens.
