= Stanley Smith (rugby league, born 1937) =

English rugby league footballer

Stan Smith
Personal information
- Full name: Stanley Smith
- Born: 28 May 1937; Wakefield district, England
- Died: 14 November 2012 (aged 75)

Playing information
- Position: Wing
Club
Years	Team	Pld	T	G	FG	P
1954–61	Wakefield Trinity	59	39	0	0	117
1961–61	Bramley
	Total	59	39	0	0	117

Stanley "Stan" Smith (28 May 1937 – 14 November 2012) was an English professional rugby league footballer who played in the 1950s and 1960s. He played at club level for Wakefield Trinity and Bramley, as a wing.

== Background ==
Stan Smith's birth was registered in Wakefield district, West Riding of Yorkshire, England, he was a pupil at Manygates Secondary Modern School in the late 1940s, and early 1950s, he worked at West Riding Bus Company c. 1960, he lived on Agbrigg Road, Wakefield, he was on the committee of Duke of York ARLFC, Agbrigg Road, Sandal, Wakefield, and he died aged 75.

== Playing career ==
Stan Smith played on the wing in Wakefield Trinity's 20-24 defeat by Leeds in the 1958–59 Yorkshire Cup Final during the 1958–59 season at Odsal Stadium, Bradford on Saturday 18 October 1958.

=== Contemporaneous description ===
Stanley Smith, after successful work with the Wakefield Schools R.L. side, was a member of our own "Trinity Juniors." He signed for Trinity in 1954 and made his senior début in December of that year. In the following season he made 15 appearances and scored 8 tries, but then came a break in his career with a call for Military Service. He has helped Trinity’s senior side on many occasions since his return from the forces without being able to command a regular berth. It is, of course, with that in mind – that he and Chamberlain will have the chance of regular senior football – that these transfers have been made. Smith’s full record with Trinity is:- Appearances 59. Tries 39. Points 117.

— Wakefield Trinity RLFC Official Programme, 23 September 1961

== Genealogical information ==
Stan Smith's marriage to Molly (née Geary) (born 1937) was registered between January and March 1961 in Wakefield district. Smith's wife Molly is the middle sister of Peggy who married Albert Firth, and Lily who married Leslie Chamberlain.

== Note ==
During the late 1920 and 1930s there was a rugby league footballer who played for Wakefield Trinity, Leeds, England and Great Britain who was also called Stanley "Stan" Smith. These Stanley "Stan" Smith's are clearly not the same person, nor were they related.
