= Stan Owen =

Welsh RL coach and former GB & Wales international rugby league footballer (1932–2019)

Personal information
- Full name: Stanley Gordon Owen
- Born: 7 March 1929; Pontypridd, Rhondda Cynon Taf, Wales
- Died: 12 September 2019 (aged 90); Wigan, Greater Manchester, England

Playing information

Rugby union
Club
Years	Team	Pld	T	G	FG	P
	Pontypridd RFC

Rugby league
- Position: Prop
Club
Years	Team	Pld	T	G	FG	P
1951–64	Leigh	415	44	0	0	132
1964	St Helens	12	1	0	0	3
1964–68	Rochdale Hornets	95
1968–69	Blackpool Borough	22	2	0	0	6
	Total	544	47	0	0	141
Representative
Years	Team	Pld	T	G	FG	P
1958	Great Britain	1	0	0	0	0
1965	Other Nationalities	1
1963	Wales	1	0	0	0	0

Coaching information
Club
Years	Team	Gms	W	D	L	W%
1969	Blackpool Borough

Stanley Gordon Owen (7 March 1932 – 12 September 2019) was a Welsh rugby union, and professional rugby league footballer who played in the 1950s and 1960s. He played club level rugby union (RU) for Pontypridd RFC, and representative level rugby league (RL) for Great Britain, Wales, Other Nationalities and English League XIII, and at club level for Leigh, St. Helens, Rochdale Hornets and Blackpool Borough, as a prop.

== Background ==
Stan Owen was born in Pontypridd, Wales, and he died aged 90 in Wigan Infirmary.

== Playing career ==
Owen signed for Leigh in November 1951 and in a 13-year stay at the club made 415 appearances for the club, second only in number of appearances for Leigh to Albert Worrall. He played for Leigh in the 4–15 defeat by St. Helens in the 1963–64 Lancashire Cup Final at Knowsley Road on Saturday 26 October 1963. In 1964 he transferred to St. Helens but after playing only 12 games for St. Helens he transferred to Rochdale Hornets for whom he made 95 appearances between 1964 and 1968 including Rochdale's 5–16 defeat by Warrington in the 1965–66 Lancashire Cup Final at Knowsley Road, on Friday 29 October 1965. His final move was to join Blackpool Borough in 1968 where he made 21 appearances before retiring from playing and became Borough's coach.

=== International honours ===
Stan Owen won a cap for Great Britain (RL) while at Leigh in 1958 against France, and represented Other Nationalities (RL) while at Rochdale Hornets, he played at prop, in the 2-19 defeat by St. Helens at Knowsley Road, St. Helens on Wednesday 27 January 1965, to mark the switching-on of new floodlights.

Stan Owen also represented English League XIII (RL) playing at prop in the 19–8 victory over France at Headingley, Leeds on Wednesday 16 April 1958, and Wales (RL) while at Leigh in a non-Test match on Thursday 19 May 1955 against France 'B' at Stade Marcel Saupin, Nantes, and in a non-Test match on Sunday 17 February 1963 against France at Stadium Municipal, Toulouse.
