= Keith Slater (rugby league) =

English rugby league footballer

Personal information
- Full name: Keith Slater
- Born: unknown

Playing information
- Position: Wing
Club
Years	Team	Pld	T	G	FG	P
1968–71/72	Wakefield Trinity	118	82	13	0	272
Representative
Years	Team	Pld	T	G	FG	P
1970–71	Yorkshire	4	2	0	0	6

Keith Slater (birth unknown) is a former rugby union and professional rugby league footballer who played in the 1960s and 1970s. He played representative level rugby union (RUL) for English Schoolboys, and at university level for Cambridge University R.U.F.C., and representative level rugby league (RL) for Yorkshire, and at club level for Wakefield Trinity, as a wing.

== Playing career ==
Keith Slater played rugby union for English Schoolboys in 1963 and was awarded a Cambridge University rugby blue in 1964. He made his début for Wakefield Trinity during October 1968, and he played his last match for Wakefield Trinity during the 1971–72 season.

=== County honours ===
Keith Slater won 3 caps for Yorkshire (RL) while at Wakefield Trinity.

=== Career records ===
In 1971, Keith Slater equaled Wakefield Trinity's "most tries in a match" record, with 7-tries held by Fred Smith, this is still Wakefield Trinity's joint-record.
