= Willie Aspinall =

GB international rugby league footballer (1942–2021)

Personal information
- Full name: William H. Aspinall
- Born: 8 November 1942 St Helens, England
- Died: 23 October 2021 (aged 78)

Playing information
- Height: 5 ft 9 in (175 cm)
- Weight: 11 st 7 lb (73 kg)
- Position: Stand-off
Club
Years	Team	Pld	T	G	FG	P
1962–71	Warrington	268	55	40	30	305
1971–75	Rochdale Hornets	98	22	8	4	86
	Total	366	77	48	34	391
Representative
Years	Team	Pld	T	G	FG	P
1966	Great Britain	1	1	0	0	3
1965–67	Lancashire	7	2	2	0	10
1966	GB tour games	19	9	0	0	27

Willie Aspinall (8 November 1942 – 23 October 2021) was a professional rugby league footballer who played in the 1960s and 1970s. He played at representative level for Great Britain, and at club level for Warrington, and Rochdale Hornets, as a stand-off

== Playing career ==
=== International honours ===
Willie Aspinall won a cap for Great Britain while at Warrington on the 1966 Great Britain Lions tour against New Zealand. He also made 19 non-test match appearances for Great Britain during the 1966 tour.

=== Club career ===
Willie Aspinall gained two winners' medals while at Warrington, the 16–5 victory over Rochdale Hornets in the 1965 Lancashire Cup Final at Knowsley Road, St. Helens on Friday 29 October 1965, and victory in the Lancashire League during the 1967–68 season. He played stand-off, and scored a drop goal in Warrington's 2–2 draw with St. Helens in the 1967 Lancashire Cup Final at Central Park, Wigan on Saturday 7 October 1967, but did not play in the replay.

He played on the wing, in Rochdale Hornets' 16–27 defeat by Warrington in the 1973–74 Player's No.6 Trophy Final at Central Park, Wigan on Saturday 9 February 1974.

== Honoured at Warrington Wolves ==
Willie Aspinall was inducted into the Warrington Wolves Hall of Fame in 2005.
