= Thomas Smales =

Great Britain and England international rugby league footballer (1934–2017)

Tommy Smales
Personal information
- Full name: Thomas Smales
- Born: 19 December 1934 Glasshoughton, West Riding of Yorkshire, England
- Died: 26 October 2017 (aged 82) Leeds, West Yorkshire, England

Playing information
- Height: 5 ft 6 in (1.68 m)
- Weight: 11 st 7 lb (73 kg)
- Position: Scrum-half
Club
Years	Team	Pld	T	G	FG	P
1952–55	Featherstone Rovers	35	13	0	0	39
1955–58	Huddersfield	295	111	1		335
1958–60	Castleford	4	0	0	0	0
1960–63	Huddersfield
1964–67	Bradford Northern	61	13	0		39
1967	North Sydney	9	0	0		0
1967–68	Wakefield Trinity	5	0	0		0
	Total	409	137	1	0	413
Representative
Years	Team	Pld	T	G	FG	P
1962	England	1	0	0	0	0
1962–65	Great Britain	8	2	0	0	6

Coaching information
Club
Years	Team	Gms	W	D	L	W%
1969–70	Castleford	67	46	2	19	69
1976	Featherstone Rovers	16	11	1	4	69
1978–79	Featherstone Rovers	22	6	1	15	27
	Total	105	63	4	38	60
- Relatives: Dale Fennell (nephew)

Thomas Smales (19 December 1934 – 26 October 2017) was an English professional rugby league footballer who played in the 1950s, 1960s and 1970s, and coached in the 1960s and 1970s. He played at representative level for Great Britain and England, and at club level for Castleford, Huddersfield (captain), Bradford Northern, North Sydney Bears and Wakefield Trinity as a scrum-half, and coached at club level for Castleford and Featherstone Rovers (two spells).

== Background ==
Tommy Smales's birth was registered in Pontefract, West Riding of Yorkshire, England, he was the landlord of the Traveller's Rest public house, Pontefract Road, Featherstone for 35-years, from 1969 until 2004, and he died aged 82 in Leeds, West Yorkshire, England.

== Playing career ==
=== Club career ===
Tommy Smales made his début for Featherstone Rovers on Saturday 23 August 1952.

=== Championship final appearances ===
Tommy Smales played scrum-half, and was captain in Huddersfield's 14-5 victory over Wakefield Trinity in the Championship Final during the 1961–62 season at Odsal Stadium, Bradford on Saturday 19 May 1962.

=== Challenge Cup Final appearances ===
Tommy Smales played scrum-half, and was captain in Huddersfield's 6-12 defeat by Wakefield Trinity in the 1961–62 Challenge Cup Final during the 1961–62 season at Wembley Stadium, London on Saturday 12 May 1962, in front of a crowd of 81,263.

=== County Cup Final appearances ===
Tommy Smales played scrum-half, and scored a try in Huddersfield's 15-8 victory over York in the 1957–58 Yorkshire Cup Final during the 1957–58 season at Headingley, Leeds on Saturday 19 October 1957, played scrum-half in the 10-16 defeat by Wakefield Trinity in the 1960–61 Yorkshire Cup Final during the 1960–61 season at Headingley, Leeds on Saturday 29 October 1960, and played scrum-half in Bradford Northern's 17-8 victory over Hunslet in the 1965–66 Yorkshire Cup Final during the 1965–66 season at Headingley, Leeds on Saturday 16 October 1965.

=== International honours ===
Tommy Smales won a cap for England while at Huddersfield in 1962 against France, and won caps for Great Britain while at Huddersfield in 1962 against France, in 1963 against France, and Australia, in 1964 against France (2 matches), and while at Bradford Northern in 1965 against New Zealand (3 matches).

== Coaching career ==
=== Challenge Cup Final appearances ===
Tommy Smales was the coach in Castleford's 7-2 victory over Wigan in the 1969–70 Challenge Cup Final during the 1969–70 season at Wembley Stadium, London on Saturday 9 May 1970, in front of a crowd of 95,255.

=== Club career ===
Tommy Smales was the coach of Castleford, his first game in charge was on Sunday 3 August 1969, and his last game in charge was on Saturday 28 November 1970.

== Genealogical information ==
Tommy Smales was the uncle of the rugby league footballer; Dale Fennell.

== Note ==
Somewhat confusingly, Tommy Smales played in the same era as the unrelated Wigan, Barrow and Featherstone Rovers loose forward of the 1950s and 1960s, Thomas "Tommy" Smales.
