= Rob Valentine (rugby) =

Scottish rugby league & union footballer (1941–2024)

Personal information
- Full name: Robert Angus Valentine
- Born: 22 February 1941 Hawick, Scotland
- Died: 11 June 2024 (aged 83) Melrose, Scotland

Playing information

Rugby union
- Position: Flanker
Club
Years	Team	Pld	T	G	FG	P
≤1958/59–58/59	Hawick Wanderers RFC
1958/59–≤63	Hawick Linden RFC
≤1963–63	Hawick RFC
	Total	0	0	0	0	0
Representative
Years	Team	Pld	T	G	FG	P
≤1963–63	South of Scotland	8

Rugby league
- Position: Prop, Second-row, Loose forward
Club
Years	Team	Pld	T	G	FG	P
1963–70	Huddersfield
1970–73/74	Wakefield Trinity	129	10	1	0	32
1973–75	Keighley
	Total	129	10	1	0	32
Representative
Years	Team	Pld	T	G	FG	P
1967	Great Britain	1	0	0	0	0
1974	Other Nationalities	1	0	0	0	0
- Relatives: Alec Valentine (brother); Dave Valentine (brother)

Robert Angus Valentine (22 February 1941 – 11 June 2024) was a Scottish rugby union and professional rugby league footballer who played in the 1950s, 1960s and 1970s, and coached rugby league in the 1970s.

Valentine played representative level rugby union (RU) for South of Scotland, and at club level for Hawick Wanderers RFC, Hawick Linden RFC and Hawick RFC as a flanker, and representative level rugby league (RL) for Great Britain and Other Nationalities, and at club level for Huddersfield, Wakefield Trinity and Keighley (captain), as a prop, second-row or loose forward, and coached at club level rugby league (RL) for Britannia Works in 1975 in Huddersfield's Pennine League, and formed the Huddersfield colts team in 1976.

== Background ==
Bob Valentine was born in Hawick, Scotland, and he worked as an electrician. He died in Melrose on 11 June 2024, at the age of 83.

== Playing career ==
=== International honours ===
Rob Valentine represented South of Scotland (RU) while at Hawick RFC, his last match being the 0–8 defeat by New Zealand in the 1963–64 New Zealand rugby union tour match at Mansfield Park, Hawick on Saturday 16 November 1963, and represented Other Nationalities (RL) while at Huddersfield, he played loose forward in the 2–19 defeat by St. Helens at Knowsley Road, St. Helens on Wednesday 27 January 1965, to mark the switching-on of new floodlights.

=== County Cup Final appearances ===
Rob Valentine played at prop in Wakefield Trinity's 2–7 defeat by Leeds in the 1973–74 Yorkshire Cup Final during the 1973–74 season at Headingley, Leeds on Saturday 20 October 1973.

=== Player's No.6 Trophy Final appearances ===
Rob Valentine played at second-row and scored a try in Wakefield Trinity's 11–22 defeat by Halifax in the 1971–72 Player's No.6 Trophy Final during the 1971–72 season at Odsal Stadium, Bradford on Saturday 22 January 1972.

=== Club career ===
Rob Valentine transferred from Hawick RFC to Huddersfield in 1963 for a signing-on fee of £4,000 (based on increases in average earnings, this would be approximately £160,800 in 2016), he made his début for Wakefield Trinity during October 1970.

== Genealogical information ==
Rob Valentine is the younger brother of the rugby union, and rugby league footballer; Dave Valentine, and the rugby union footballer; Alec Valentine.
