= Ken Bowman (rugby league) =

English rugby league footballer (1937–2013)

Personal information
- Full name: Kenneth David Bowman
- Born: 6 March 1937 Great Ouseburn, England
- Died: 10 October 2013 (aged 76) Bromborough, Cheshire, England

Playing information
- Height: 5 ft 11 in (1.80 m)
- Weight: 15 st 1 lb (96 kg)
- Position: Wing, Second-row
Club
Years	Team	Pld	T	G	FG	P
1956–65	Huddersfield	247	76	0	0	228
1965–67	Bradford Northern	33	3	0	0	9
	Total	280	79	0	0	237
Representative
Years	Team	Pld	T	G	FG	P
1962–63	Great Britain	3	0	0	0	0
1963	Yorkshire	3	0	0	0	0

Kenneth "Ken" David Bowman (6 March 1937 – 10 October 2013) was an English professional rugby league footballer who played in the 1950s and 1960s. He played at representative level for Great Britain, and at club level for Huddersfield and Bradford Northern, as a wing, or second-row, he died from cancer in The Wirral.

== Early life ==
Bowman was born in Great Ouseburn, Harrogate, West Riding of Yorkshire, and attended Fishergate Primary School. He began playing rugby league at school and for Heworth before turning professional in April 1955, aged 17, to sign for Huddersfield.

== Playing career ==
=== Challenge Cup Final appearances ===
Ken Bowman played at second-row in Huddersfield's 6-12 defeat by Wakefield Trinity in the 1961–62 Challenge Cup Final during the 1961–62 season at Wembley Stadium, London on Saturday 12 May 1962, in front of a crowd of 81,263.

=== County Cup Final appearances ===
Ken Bowman played at second-row and scored a try in Huddersfield's 15-8 victory over York in the 1957–58 Yorkshire Cup Final during the 1957–58 season at Headingley, Leeds on Saturday 19 October 1957, and played at second-row in the 10-16 defeat by Wakefield Trinity in the 1960–61 Yorkshire Cup Final during the 1960–61 season at Headingley, Leeds on Saturday 29 October 1960.

=== Testimonial match ===
Ken Bowman's Testimonial match at Huddersfield took place in 1965. He made 247 appearances for the club before transferring to Bradford Northern in September 1965.

=== International honours ===
Ken Bowman won caps for Great Britain while at Huddersfield in 1962 against France, and in 1963 against France, and Australia.

== Personal life ==
Bowman married his wife, Beryl, in 1957, with whom he had two sons, Chris and Paul. He was a salesman and later a sales manager at Leyland Paints, later named Kalon Group PLC, he moved to the Wirral in 1977, he retired from work in 2002. He was captain of Bromborough Golf Club, a regular church goer. Ken was an active Freemason and a member of Noctorum Lodge 5913. He died aged 76 in Bromborough, Cheshire, England.
