= Brian Briggs =

Great Britain and England international rugby league footballer

Personal information
- Full name: Brian Briggs
- Born: 29 March 1932; Wakefield, England
- Died: 2 August 1996 (aged 64); Canberra, Australia

Playing information
- Height: 6 ft 1 in (185 cm)
- Weight: 13 st 5 lb (85 kg)
- Position: Second-row
Club
Years	Team	Pld	T	G	FG	P
≤1952–52	York
1952–58	Huddersfield
1958–60	St. Helens	83	4	11	0	34
1960–62	Wakefield Trinity
	Total	83	4	11	0	34
Representative
Years	Team	Pld	T	G	FG	P
1954–63	Yorkshire	7	0	0	0	0
1956	England	1	0	0	0	0
1954–56	Great Britain	3	0	0	0	0

Brian Briggs (29 March 1932 – 2 August 1996) was an English professional rugby league footballer who played in the 1950s and 1960s. He played at representative level for Great Britain, England and Yorkshire, and at club level for York, Huddersfield, St. Helens and Wakefield Trinity, as a second-row.

== Background ==
Brian Briggs was born in Wakefield, West Riding of Yorkshire, England.

== Playing career ==
=== Huddersfield ===
Briggs played at second-row in Huddersfield's 15–8 victory over York in the 1957 Yorkshire Cup Final during the 1957–58 season at Headingley, Leeds on Saturday 19 October 1957.

=== St Helens ===
Briggs was signed by St. Helens from Huddersfield on Friday 14 February 1958, and made his St. Helens début against Oldham on Saturday 15 February 1958. He was a stalwart for St. Helens playing over 80 matches mostly in the second-row position. He was a hard running and tough tackling second-row who added great steel to the St. Helens pack at the time. In 83 matches for the club Briggs scored 4 tries, kicked 11 goals for a total points aggregate of 34 points. Brigg's first try for St. Helens came at Hunslet as St. Helens cruised to a 33 points to two victory. On Tuesday 14 April 1959 Brian Briggs scored a try and kicked two goals as St. Helens defeated Hull F.C. at Knowsley Road in front of 18,500 spectators. He partnered Dick Huddart in the second-row in the resounding 1959 Championship Final 44 points to 22 victory over Hunslet, and he played his last match for St. Helens against Wigan in the Championship semi-final defeat on Saturday 7 May 1960.

He played at second-row in St. Helens 2–12 defeat by Oldham in the 1958 Lancashire Cup Final during the 1958–59 season at Central Park, Wigan on Saturday 25 October 1958, and played at second-row in the 4–5 defeat by Warrington in the 1959 Lancashire Cup Final during the 1959–60 season at Central Park, Wigan on Saturday 31 October 1959.

=== Wakefield Trinity ===
Briggs transferred to the emerging great Wakefield Trinity side of the early 1960s for £5,000.

He played at second-row in Wakefield Trinity's 16–10 victory over Huddersfield in the 1960 Yorkshire Cup Final during the 1960–61 season at Headingley, Leeds on Saturday 29 October 1960, and played at second-row in the 19–9 victory over Leeds in the 1961 Yorkshire Cup Final during the 1961–62 season at Odsal Stadium, Bradford on Saturday 11 November 1961.

Briggs played left-second-row in Wakefield Trinity's 12–6 victory over Huddersfield in the 1962 Challenge Cup Final during the 1961–62 season at Wembley Stadium, London on Saturday 12 May 1962.

=== Representative honours ===
Brian Briggs, won a cap for England while at Huddersfield in 1956 against France, and won a cap for Great Britain while at Huddersfield in 1954 against New Zealand.

Briggs managed to earn two caps for Yorkshire whilst at St. Helens, and won further cap(s) for Yorkshire while at Wakefield Trinity.
