= Osgodby, coastal North Yorkshire =

Village and civil parish in North Yorkshire, England

Coordinates: 54.246900°N 0.380000°W

Osgodby
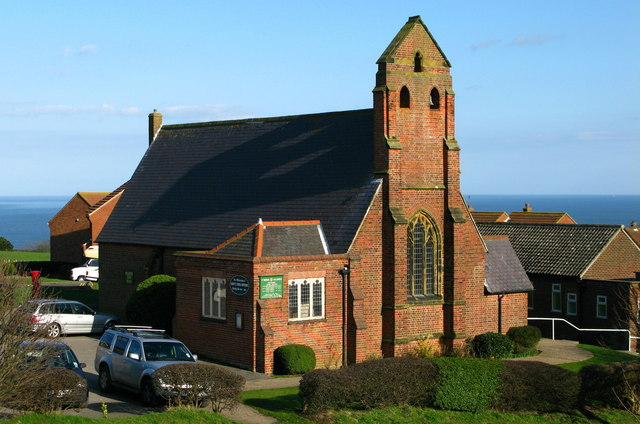
- St Michael & All Angels Church

- Location within North Yorkshire
- Population: 1,248 (2011 census)
- OS grid reference: TA055846
- Civil parish: Osgodby
- Unitary authority: North Yorkshire
- Ceremonial county: North Yorkshire
- Region: Yorkshire and the Humber
- Country: England
- Sovereign state: United Kingdom
- Post town: SCARBOROUGH
- Postcode district: YO11
- Police: North Yorkshire
- Fire: North Yorkshire
- Ambulance: Yorkshire
- UK Parliament: Scarborough and Whitby

Osgodby is a village and civil parish in the district and county of North Yorkshire, England.

Approximately 3 miles (4.8 km) south of Scarborough off the coastal road, Osgodby was a medieval village with a manor house mentioned in the Domesday Book as Asgozbi ('Asgaut's farm or estate'). It appears to have grown until the 13th or 14th century and then declined to a sparsely populated farming area by the 19th century. Housing was developed east of the medieval site in the 1930s and again from the 1960s, with buildings of farms on the site of the manor house being converted into a pub and a restaurant. The oldest surviving building is Stuart House, dated 1615. Remnants of a 13th-century chantry chapel of St Leonard have been incorporated into a barn.

According to the 2011 UK census, Osgodby parish had a population of 1,248, an increase on the 2001 UK census figure of 1,186.

From 1974 to 2023 it was part of the Borough of Scarborough, it is now administered by the unitary North Yorkshire Council.

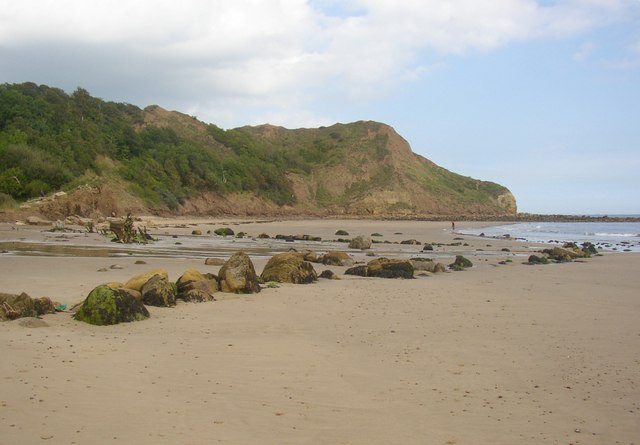
Osgodby Point
