= Bulldog Tools =

British manufacturer of gardening and agricultural tools

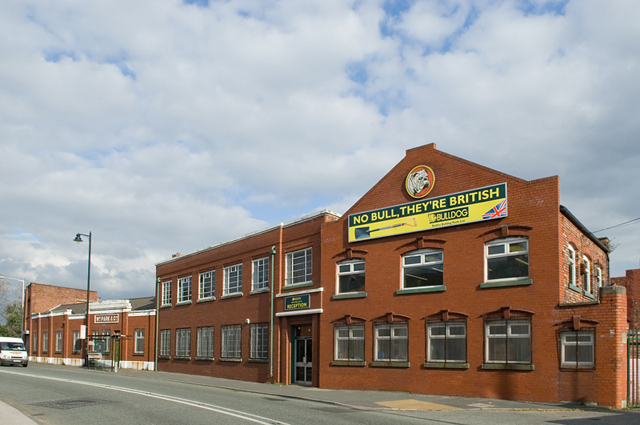
- Bulldog Tools in Wigan
- Company type: Subsidiary
- Industry: Gardening tools
- Founded: 1790; 236 years ago
- Founders: William & Henry Parkes
- Headquarters: Wigan, Greater Manchester, England
- Products: Spades, shovels, forks, rakes, hoes
- Parent: Rollins Group
- Website: bulldogtools.co.uk

Bulldog Tools is a British manufacturer of gardening and agricultural tools based in Ince in Makerfield, Wigan, Greater Manchester, England. The company was founded by William & Henry Parkes, and established in 1780 at the Clarington Forge site in Ince in Makerfield, near Wigan, then in Lancashire. Bulldog Tools is one of the oldest businesses still existing in the Wigan area today, still producing products on the same factory site as originally intended. Bulldog spades were deployed by the British during WW1 to dig trenches and are still issued in the British military today. Today it is owned by the Rollins Group based in Harlow in Essex who acquired Bulldog Tools in 2004.

== Garden tools ==
Tools produced at the factory include spades, shovels, forks, rakes, hoes and various gardening hand tools. These products are made for agricultural and domestic use. The spade and fork heads are solid forged using a single piece of steel and were up until recently made using carbon steel, today a boron steel compound is preferred. The company is one of the last remaining manufacturers of traditional solid forged garden tools in the UK.

== The world's largest spade ==
In 2010, as part of its 230th anniversary celebrations, Bulldog Tools manufactured the world's largest spade at its forge in Wigan. The spade is 3.61 metres high, weighs 180 kg and took 160 hours to make. It held the Guinness World Record until 17 July 2014.
