= Billy Watkins (rugby union, born 1933) =

- Full name: William Raymond Watkins
- Born: 22 March 1933 Newbridge, Wales
- Died: 19 May 2013 (aged 80) Abergavenny, Wales

Rugby union career
- Position: Scrum-half
International career
Years	Team	Apps	(Points)
1959	Wales	1	(0)

William Raymond Watkins (22 March 1933 – 19 May 2013) was a Welsh international rugby union player.

Born in Newbridge, Watkins began playing senior rugby for hometown club Newbridge RFC as a 15-year old.

Watkins, a scrum-half, joined Newport in the 1957–58 season and won a Wales cap during the 1959 Five Nations, picked as a half-back partner to club teammate Malcolm Thomas against France at Colombes.

== See also ==
- List of Wales national rugby union players
