= 1956–57 Challenge Cup =

Rugby Competition Season

- Duration: 5 rounds
- Winners: Leeds
- Runners-up: Barrow
- Lance Todd Trophy: Jeff Stevenson

The 1956–57 Challenge Cup was the 56th staging of rugby league's oldest knockout competition, the Challenge Cup.

== First round ==
Date	Team one	Score one	Team two	Score two
09 Feb	Barrow	53	Wakefield Loco	12
09 Feb	Bradford Northern	20	Dewsbury	7
09 Feb	Doncaster	5	Castleford	15
09 Feb	Halifax	48	Widnes St Maries	0
09 Feb	Hull FC	15	Keighley	12
09 Feb	Hull Kingston Rovers	2	Salford	10
09 Feb	Hunslet	14	Batley	7
09 Feb	Leeds	13	Wigan	11
09 Feb	Leigh	17	Featherstone Rovers	11
09 Feb	Liverpool	2	Widnes	11
09 Feb	Rochdale Hornets	10	Blackpool	18
09 Feb	Swinton	5	Huddersfield	5
09 Feb	Wakefield Trinity	37	York	15
09 Feb	Warrington	14	Bramley	2
09 Feb	Whitehaven	9	St Helens	8
09 Feb	Workington Town	5	Oldham	14
13 Feb	Huddersfield	5	Swinton	0

== Second round ==
Date	Team one	Score one	Team two	Score two
23 Feb	Castleford	2	Barrow	9
23 Feb	Hull FC	3	Halifax	9
23 Feb	Leeds	28	Warrington	6
23 Feb	Leigh	5	Oldham	0
23 Feb	Salford	2	Huddersfield	6
23 Feb	Whitehaven	7	Hunslet	0
27 Feb	Bradford Northern	8	Widnes	10
27 Feb	Wakefield Trinity	9	Blackpool	11

== Quarterfinals ==
Date	Team one	Score one	Team two	Score two
09 Mar	Barrow	10	Huddersfield	0
09 Mar	Blackpool	13	Leigh	24
09 Mar	Halifax	10	Leeds	16
09 Mar	Whitehaven	2	Widnes	0

== Semifinals ==
Date	Team one	Score one	Team two	Score two
30 Mar	Barrow	2	Leigh	2
30 Mar	Leeds	10	Whitehaven	9
28 Apr	Leigh	10	Barrow	15

== Final ==
11 May 1957

Leeds	9 – 7	Barrow
Try Quinn, Hodgkinson, Robinson		Try Jackson; Goals Horne (2)

Wembley, London
Attendance: 76,318 (HT 3-0)
Player of the Match: Jeff Stevenson

Leeds beat Barrow 9–7 in the Challenge Cup Final played at Wembley Stadium before a crowd of 76,318.

This was Leeds' seventh Challenge Cup final win in nine Final appearances. Jeff Stevenson, their scrum half back, was awarded the Lance Todd Trophy for his man-of-the-match performance.
