= 1961–62 Northern Rugby Football League season =

- League: Northern Rugby Football League
- Champions: Huddersfield
- League Leaders: Wigan
- Top point-scorer: Neil Fox 456
- Top try-scorer: Billy Boston 51

The 1961–62 Northern Rugby Football League season was the 67th season of rugby league football.

== Season summary ==
Huddersfield won their seventh Championship when they beat Wakefield Trinity 14–5 in the play-off final.

The Challenge Cup winners were Wakefield Trinity, who beat Huddersfield 12–6 in the final.

At the end of this season the league was split into two divisions, the top 16 in the league formed Division 1 and the bottom 14 formed Division 2.

Wigan won the Lancashire League, and Wakefield Trinity won the Yorkshire League.

== Championship ==
	Team	Pld	W	D	L	Pts
1	Wigan	36	32	1	3	65
2	Wakefield Trinity	36	32	1	3	65
3	Featherstone Rovers	36	28	1	7	57
4	Huddersfield	36	25	2	9	52
5	Workington Town	36	25	0	11	50
6	Widnes	36	25	0	11	50
7	Leeds	36	25	0	11	50
8	Hull Kingston Rovers	36	24	0	12	48
9	St. Helens	36	23	0	13	46
10	Oldham	36	22	1	13	45
11	Swinton	36	21	1	14	43
12	Castleford	36	21	0	15	42
13	Bramley	36	19	4	13	42
14	Warrington	36	19	2	15	40
15	Halifax	36	18	3	15	39
16	Hull	36	18	1	17	37
17	Leigh	36	17	0	19	34
18	Barrow	36	14	1	21	29
19	Keighley	36	13	2	21	28
20	York	36	12	1	23	25
21	Salford	36	12	1	23	25
22	Whitehaven	36	11	2	23	24
23	Blackpool Borough	36	11	1	24	23
24	Rochdale Hornets	36	9	4	23	22
25	Hunslet	36	10	1	25	21
26	Batley	36	9	2	25	20
27	Dewsbury	36	8	2	26	18
28	Doncaster	36	8	1	27	17
29	Liverpool City	36	6	0	30	12
30	Bradford Northern	36	5	1	30	11

Play-offs

=== Play-offs ===
Semi-finals
1	Wigan	11
4	Huddersfield	13
2	Wakefield Trinity	13
3	Featherstone Rovers	8

Championship final
Huddersfield	14
Wakefield Trinity	5

==== Final ====
19 May 1962

Huddersfield	14 – 5	Wakefield Trinity
Tries: Wicks, Smales; Goals: Dyson (4)		Tries: Fox; Goals: Fox

Odsal Stadium, Bradford
Attendance: 37,451
Referee: N. T. Railton (Wigan)

Huddersfield	Number	Wakefield Trinity
	Teams	
Frank Dyson	1	Gerry Round
Aiden Breen	2	Fred Smith
Harry Deighton	3	Alan Skene
Ray Haywood	4	Neil Fox
Mike Wicks	5	Kenneth Hirst
Gwyn Davies	6	Harold Poynton
Thomas Smales	7	Keith Holliday
Ted Slevin	8	Jack Wilkinson
Don Close	9	Milan Kosanović
Ken Noble	10	Albert Firth
Austin Kilroy	11	Brian Briggs
Ken Bowman	12	Don Vines
Peter Ramsden	13	Derek Turner
	Coach	Ken Traill

== Challenge Cup ==
Wakefield Trinity beat Huddersfield 12–6 in the Challenge Cup Final played at Wembley Stadium before a crowd of 81,263. This was Wakefield Trinity's third Challenge Cup Final win in four Final appearances. Neil Fox, their centre, was awarded the Lance Todd Trophy for his man-of-the-match performance. This has been the only time in a Rugby League Challenge Cup Final that a place kick has not been converted. Fox dropped three goals for Wakefield Trinity, then worth two points each.

== County cups ==
St. Helens beat Swinton 25–9 to win the Lancashire County Cup, and Wakefield Trinity beat Leeds 19–9 to win the Yorkshire County Cup.

== Sources ==
- Saxton, Irvin (ed.). History of Rugby League: No.67 1961–1962. League Publications.
- 1961-62 Rugby Football League season at wigan.rlfans.com
- The Challenge Cup at The Rugby Football League website
