= 1972 Rugby League World Cup squads =

This is a list of the teams which took part at the 1972 Rugby League World Cup.

== Australia ==
Coach: Harry Bath

1. Graeme Langlands (c) fullback from St. George
2. Arthur Beetson, prop/second row forward from Eastern Suburbs
3. Ray Branighan, centre/wing from Manly-Warringah
4. Bob Fulton, five-eight/centre form Manly-Warringah
5. John Elford, second row forward from Western Suburbs
6. John Grant, centre/wing/fullback from South Brisbane
7. Mark Harris, centre/wing from Eastern Suburbs
8. Fred Jones, hooker from Manly-Warringah
9. Stephen Knight, centre/wing from Western Suburbs
10. Bob McCarthy, second row forward from South Sydney
11. John O'Neill, prop-forward from Manly-Warringah
12. Bob O'Reilly, prop forward from Parramatta
13. Tommy Raudonikis, half-back from Western Suburbs
14. Paul Sait, centre/lock/second row from South Sydney
15. Geoff Starling, centre/wing/fullback from Balmain
16. Gary Stevens, second row forward from South Sydney
17. Gary Sullivan, lock forward from Newtown
18. Dennis Ward, half-back from Manly-Warringah
19. Elwyn Walters, hooker from South Sydney

== France ==
- Initially called up as a starting member playing as back, Maurice de Matos was replaced by Raymond Toujas due to an injury before the tournament. Roger Garrigue, who was the main halfback and captain, withdrew from the tournament and could not be called up due to a severe injury.

Coach:Antoine Jimenez

1. Francis de Nadai (c) (Limoux)
2. Michel Anglade (Saint-Gaudens)
3. Élie Bonal (Carcassionne)
4. Jean-Marie Bonal (Carcassonne)
5. Jacques Franc (Saint-Jacques)
6. Marius Frattini (Cavaillon)
7. Jacques Garzino (Avignon)
8. Serge Gleyzes (Carcassonne)
9. Bernard Guilhem (Carcassonne)
10. Jean-Marie Imbert (Avignon)
11. Serge Marsolan (Saint-Gaudens)
12. Michel Mazaré (Villeneuve-sur-Lot)
13. Michel Molinier (Saint-Gaudens)
14. Guy Rodriguez (Toulouse)
15. André Ruiz (Carcassonne)
16. Jean-Paul Sauret (Villefranche)
17. Victor Serrano (Saint-Gaudens)
18. Raymond Toujas (Carcassonne)
19. Charles Zalduendo (Toulouse)

== Great Britain ==
- Roger Millward, Mick Harrison and Ken Kelly were selected in the initial squad, but all withdrew due to injury.

Coach: Jim Challinor

1. Clive Sullivan (c), wing from Hull
2. John Atkinson, wing from Leeds
3. Paul Charlton, fullback from Salford
4. Terry Clawson, prop/second row forward from Leeds
5. Colin Dixon, second row/loose forward from Salford
6. Chris Hesketh, centre/stand-off from Salford
7. John Holmes, stand-off from Leeds
8. Robert Irving, second row forward from Oldham
9. David Jeanes, prop forward from Leeds
10. Tony Karalius, hooker from St. Helens
11. Brian Lockwood, second row forward from Castleford
12. Phil Lowe, second row forward from Hull Kingston Rovers
13. Steve Nash, scrum half from Featherstone Rovers
14. George Nicholls, loose forward from Widnes
15. Dennis O'Neill, stand-off from Widnes
16. David Redfearn, wing from Bradford Northern
17. Mike Stephenson, hooker from Dewsbury
18. David Topliss, stand-off from Wakefield Trinity
19. John Walsh, utility back from St. Helens

== New Zealand ==
Coach:Des Barchard

Player	Position	Age	Club	Games	Points
Roy Christian (c)	Centre	29	Auckland	3	0
Mocky Brereton	Wing	25	Canterbury	3	3
Bill Burgoyne	Hooker	26	Auckland	3	3
Tony Coll	Second-row	22	West Coast	2	3
Warren Collicoat	Fullback	21	Auckland	1	0
Graeme Cooksley	Scrum-half	23	Canterbury	1	0
Murray Eade	Loose forward	24	Auckland	3	3
Doug Gailey	Prop	24	Auckland	3	0
Peter Gurnick	Loose forward	23	Auckland	3	0
Don Mann	Prop	30	Auckland	2	0
Mita Mohi	Prop	33	Canterbury	1	0
John O'Sullivan	Centre	22	Auckland	1	0
Phillip Orchard	Wing	24	Wellington	3	6
Bob Paul	Second-row	29	Wellington	2	0
Brian Tracey	Scrum-half	30	Auckland	3	0
Rodney Walker	Loose forward	23	Canterbury	2	0
John Whittaker	Wing	22	Wellington	3	6
Dennis Williams	Five-eighth	19	Auckland	3	3
John Wilson	Fullback	25	Auckland	2	6
