= 1972 Rugby League World Cup group stage =

The 1972 Rugby League World Cup group stage was the main component of the 1972 Rugby League World Cup, with the top two nations qualifying for the World Cup final. The group consisted of hosts France as well as Australia, Great Britain and New Zealand.

== Ladder ==
Team	Pld	W	D	L	PF	PA	PD	Pts	Qualification
Great Britain	3	3	0	0	93	44	+49	6	Advances to the Final
Australia	3	2	0	1	61	41	+20	4	Advances to the Final
France	3	1	0	2	33	53	−20	2	
New Zealand	3	0	0	3	33	82	−49	0	

== Matches ==
=== France vs New Zealand ===
Saturday 28 October

France	20–9	New Zealand
Tries: Jean-Marie Bonal (2); Andre Ruiz; Goals: Bernard Guilhem (4); Jean-Marie Bonal (1); Field Goals: Marius Frattini (1)		Tries: Phillip Orchard (2); Mocky Brereton; Goals:

Stade Vélodrome, Marseille
Attendance: 20,748
Referee: Georges Jameau (France)

France	New Zealand

FB	1	Roger Toujas
RW	2	Serge Marsolan
CE	3	Michel Moliner
CE	4	Andre Ruiz
LW	5	Jean-Marie Bonal
SO	6	Bernard Guilhem
SH	7	Marius Frattini
PR	8	Francis de Nadai (c)
HK	9	Jacques Franc
PR	10	Jacques Garzino
SR	11	Victor Serrano
SR	12	Serge Gleyzes
LF	13	Michel Anglade
Substitutions:
IC	14	Charles Zalduendo
IC	15
Coach:

FB	1	John Whittaker
RW	2	Phillip Orchard
CE	3	John O'Sullivan
CE	4	Roy Christian (c)
LW	5	Mocky Brereton
FE	6	Dennis Williams
HB	7	Brian Tracey
PR	8	Mita Mohi
HK	9	Bill Burgoyne
PR	10	Bob Paul
SR	11	Doug Gailey
SR	12	Peter Gurnick
LK	13	Murray Eade
Substitutions:
IC	14	Graeme Cooksley
IC	15	Tony Coll
Coach:
(New Zealand) Des Barchard

France kicked off the tournament by sharing six tries with the Kiwis but a massive penalty count in their favour allowed the French to dictate play, their five goals and a drop goal to none by the Kiwis proving decisive.

=== Great Britain vs Australia ===
Sunday 29 October

Great Britain	27–21	Australia
Tries: John Atkinson; Phil Lowe; Dennis O'Neill; Mike Stephenson; Clive Sullivan; Goals: Terry Clawson (6/6)		Tries: Bob Fulton (3); Tommy Raudonikis Goals: Graeme Langlands (4); Field Goals: Bob McCarthy (1)

Stade Gilbert Brutus, Perpignan
Attendance: 6,324
Referee: Claude Teisseire (France)

Great Britain	Australia

FB	1	Paul Charlton
RW	2	Clive Sullivan (c)
CE	3	Chris Hesketh
CE	4	John Walsh
LW	5	John Atkinson
SO	6	Dennis O'Neill
SH	7	Steve Nash
PR	8	Terry Clawson
HK	9	Mike Stephenson
PR	10	David Jeanes
SR	11	Brian Lockwood
SR	12	Phil Lowe
LF	13	George Nicholls
Substitutions:
IC	14	John Holmes
IC	15
Coach:
(England) Jim Challinor

FB	1	Graeme Langlands (c)
RW	2	Stephen Knight
CE	3	Geoff Starling
CE	4	Ray Branighan
LW	5	Mark Harris
FE	6	Bob Fulton
HB	7	Tommy Raudonikis
PR	8	John O'Neill
HK	9	Elwyn Walters
PR	10	Arthur Beetson
SR	11	Bob McCarthy
SR	12	John Elford
LK	13	Gary Sullivan
Substitutions:
IC	14	Dennis Ward
IC	15	Paul Sait
Coach:
(Australia) Harry Bath

At Perpignan a monumental struggle finally went Britain's way 27–21 against the Kangaroos, for whom Bob Fulton grabbed three tries in a lost cause. An unusual incident occurred during the second half of the match. Following John Atkinson's try, Australian second rower John Elford came through with a swinging arm that only just missed its mark. The players didn't react to the incident with the British players only celebrating the try and not worrying about Elford's action. Then following Terry Clausen's successful conversion, French referee Claude Teisseire, instead of allowing the Australian's to re-start with a kick-off, instead gave Great Britain a penalty on halfway citing Elford's swinging arm. To rub salt into the Australian's wound, British captain Clive Sullivan opted for the kick at goal from halfway, which Clausen duly landed.

=== France vs Great Britain ===
Wednesday 1 November

France	4–13	Great Britain
Try: Goals: Jean-Marie Bonal (1); Victor Serrano (1)		Try: Phil Lowe (2); Clive Sullivan; Goals:

Stade Lesdiguières, Grenoble
Attendance: 5,321
Referee: F. Gril (France)

France	Great Britain

FB	1	Roger Toujas
RW	2	Serge Marsolan
CE	3	Michel Moliner
CE	4	Andre Ruiz
LW	5	Jean-Marie Bonal
SO	6	Bernard Guilhem
SH	7	Jean-Marie Imbert
PR	8	Francis de Nadai (c)
HK	9	Jacques Franc
PR	10	Jean-Paul Sauret
SR	11	Victor Serrano
SR	12	Serge Gleyzes
LF	13	Guy Rodriguez
Substitutions:
IC	14	Charles Zalduendo
IC	15
Coach:

FB	1	Paul Charlton
RW	2	Clive Sullivan (c)
CE	3	Chris Hesketh
CE	4	John Walsh
LW	5	John Atkinson
SO	6	Dennis O'Neill
SH	7	Steve Nash
PR	8	Terry Clawson
HK	9	Mike Stephenson
PR	10	Brian Lockwood
SR	11	Colin Dixon
SR	12	Phil Lowe
LF	13	George Nicholls
Substitutions:
IC	14
IC	15
Coach:
(England) Jim Challinor

Great Britain overcame France 13–4 to qualify for the final with outstanding second-rower Phil Lowe scoring two tries.

=== Australia vs New Zealand ===
Wednesday 1 November

Australia	9–5	New Zealand
Tries: Bob Fulton; Dennis Ward; Goals: Ray Branighan (1); Field Goals: Bob Fulton (1)		Tries: John Whittaker Goals: John Wilson (1)

Parc des Princes, Paris
Attendance: 8,000
Referee: Mick Naughton (England)

Australia	New Zealand

FB	1	Graeme Langlands (c)
RW	2	John Grant
CE	3	Ray Branighan
CE	4	Geoff Starling
LW	5	Stephen Knight
FE	6	Bob Fulton
HB	7	Dennis Ward
PR	8	John O'Neill
HK	9	Elwyn Walters
PR	10	Bob O'Reilly
SR	11	Gary Sullivan
SR	12	John Elford
LK	13	Paul Sait
Substitutions:
IC	14	Gary Stevens
IC	15
Coach:
(Australia) Harry Bath

FB	1	John Wilson
RW	2	Phillip Orchard
CE	3	Mocky Brereton
CE	4	Roy Christian (c)
LW	5	John Whittaker
FE	6	Dennis Williams
HB	7	Brian Tracey
PR	8	Don Mann
HK	9	Bill Burgoyne
PR	10	Doug Gailey
SR	11	Murray Eade
SR	12	Bob Paul
LK	13	Peter Gurnick
Substitutions:
IC	14	Rodney Walker
IC	15
Coach:
(New Zealand) Des Barchard

New Zealand gave Australia a hard time, the first half being scoreless, before going down 9–5.

=== Great Britain vs New Zealand ===
Saturday 4 November

Great Britain	53–19	New Zealand
Tries: John Atkinson (2); John Holmes (2); Paul Charlton; Chris Hesketh; David Jeanes; Steve Nash; George Nicholls; Mike Stephenson; Clive Sullivan; Goals: John Holmes (10)		Tries: Bill Burgoyne; Tony Coll; Murray Eade; John Whittaker; Dennis Williams Goals: John Wilson (2)

Stade du Hameau, Pau
Attendance: 7,500
Referee: Georges Jameau (France)
Player of the Match: John Holmes

Great Britain	New Zealand

FB	1	Paul Charlton
RW	2	Clive Sullivan (c)
CE	3	Chris Hesketh
CE	4	John Walsh
LW	5	John Atkinson
SO	6	John Holmes
SH	7	Steve Nash
PR	8	David Jeanes
HK	9	Mike Stephenson
PR	10	Brian Lockwood
SR	11	Bob Irving
SR	12	Phil Lowe
LF	13	George Nicholls
Substitutions:
IC	14	David Redfearn
IC	15	Tony Karalius
Coach:
(England) Jim Challinor

FB	1	John Wilson
RW	2	Phillip Orchard
CE	3	Mocky Brereton
CE	4	Roy Christian (c)
LW	5	John Whittaker
FE	6	Dennis Williams
HB	7	Brian Tracey
PR	8	Don Mann
HK	9	Bill Burgoyne
PR	10	Doug Gailey
SR	11	Murray Eade
SR	12	Tony Coll
LK	13	Peter Gurnick
Substitutions:
IC	14	Warren Collicoat
IC	15	Rodney Walker
Coach:
(New Zealand) Des Barchard

Great Britain hammered New Zealand 53–19, a World Cup record score, with young stand-off John Holmes collecting 26 points (10 goals, 2 tries) – another World Cup record.

=== France vs Australia ===
Sunday 5 November

France	9–31	Australia
Tries: Andre Ruiz Goals: Jean-Marie Bonal (3)		Tries: Mark Harris (2); Paul Sait (2); Bob Fulton; John O'Neill; Elwyn Walters; Goals: Ray Branighan (5)

Stadium Municipal, Toulouse
Attendance: 10,332
Referee: Mick Naughton (England)

France	Australia

FB	1	Roger Toujas
RW	2	Serge Marsolan
CE	3	Michel Moliner
CE	4	Andre Ruiz
LW	5	Jean-Marie Bonal
SO	6	Michael Mazare
SH	7	Marius Frattini
PR	8	Charles Zalduendo
HK	9	Jacques Franc
PR	10	Jacques Garzino
SR	11	Victor Serrano
SR	12	Francis de Nadai (c)
LF	13	Serge Gleyzes
Substitutions:
IC	14	Bernard Guilhem
IC	15	Michel Anglade
Coach:

FB	1	Graeme Langlands (c)
RW	2	Ray Branighan
CE	3	Mark Harris
CE	4	Geoff Starling
LW	5	John Grant
FE	6	Bob Fulton
HB	7	Dennis Ward
PR	8	John O'Neill
HK	9	Elwyn Walters
PR	10	Bob O'Reilly
SR	11	Gary Stevens
SR	12	Arthur Beetson
LK	13	Paul Sait
Substitutions:
IC	14
IC	15
Coach:
(Australia) Harry Bath

Australia had to beat France at Toulouse to reach the final in the last game of the preliminaries, a task which proved well within their capabilities.
