= 1972 Rugby League World Cup final =

| Great Britain (United Kingdom) | Australia |
|---|---|
| (RFL) | (ARL) |
| 10 | 10 |
| | 1 | 2 | Total |
|---|---|---|---|
| GBR | 5 | 5 | 10 |
| AUS | 5 | 5 | 10 |
- Date: 11 November 1972
- Stadium: Stade de Gerland
- Location: Lyon, France
- Referee: Georges Jameau (France)
- Attendance: 4,231

Broadcast partners
- Broadcasters: BBC
- Commentators: Eddie Waring

The 1972 Rugby League World Cup final was the conclusive game of the 1972 Rugby League World Cup tournament and was played between Great Britain and Australia on 11 November 1972 at the Stade de Gerland ground in Lyon, France. The final was played before 4,231 fans who witnessed what is (as of 2020) the last British team to win the Rugby League World Cup.

== Background ==
The 1972 Rugby League World Cup was the sixth staging of the Rugby League World Cup since its inauguration in 1954, and the first since the 1970 tournament. The tournament was held in the France from 28 October, culminating in the final between Great Britain and Australia on 11 November.

=== Great Britain ===
Scores and results list Australia's points tally first.

| Opposing Team | For | Against | Date | Venue | Attendance | Stage |
|---|---|---|---|---|---|---|
| Australia | 27 | 21 | 29 October | Stade Gilbert Brutus, Perpignan | 6,300 | Group Stage |
| France | 13 | 4 | 1 November | Stade Lesdiguières, Grenoble | 13,231 | Group Stage |
| New Zealand | 53 | 19 | 4 November | Stade du Hameau, Pau | 7,500 | Group Stage |

Great Britain were undefeated going into the final.

=== Australia ===
Scores and results list Great Britain's points tally first.

| Opposing Team | For | Against | Date | Venue | Attendance | Stage |
|---|---|---|---|---|---|---|
| Great Britain | 21 | 27 | 29 October | Stade Gilbert Brutus, Perpignan | 6,300 | Group Stage |
| New Zealand | 9 | 5 | 1 November | Parc des Princes, Paris | 8,000 | Group Stage |
| France | 5 | 19 | 5 November | Stadium Municipal, Toulouse | 10,332 | Group Stage |

== Match details ==
11 November 1972

| Great Britain | 10–10 (ET) | Australia |
|---|---|---|
| Tries: Clive Sullivan; Mike Stephenson; Goals: Terry Clawson (2) | | Tries: John O'Neill; Arthur Beetson; Goals: Ray Branighan (2) |

Stade de Gerland, Lyon
Attendance: 4,231
Referee: Georges Jameau (France)

| Great Britain | Australia |

| FB | 1 | Paul Charlton |
| RW | 2 | Clive Sullivan (c) |
| RC | 3 | Chris Hesketh |
| LC | 4 | John Walsh |
| LW | 5 | John Atkinson |
| SO | 6 | John Holmes |
| SH | 7 | Steve Nash |
| PR | 8 | Terry Clawson |
| HK | 9 | Mike Stephenson |
| PR | 10 | David Jeanes |
| SR | 11 | Phil Lowe |
| SR | 12 | Brian Lockwood |
| LF | 13 | George Nicholls |
Substitutions:
| IC | 14 | Bob Irving |
Coach:
(England) Jim Challinor

| FB | 1 | Graeme Langlands (c) |
| RW | 2 | John Grant |
| RC | 3 | Mark Harris |
| LC | 4 | Geoff Starling |
| LW | 5 | Ray Branighan |
| FE | 6 | Bob Fulton |
| HB | 7 | Dennis Ward |
| PR | 8 | John O'Neill |
| HK | 9 | Elwyn Walters |
| PR | 10 | Bob O'Reilly |
| SR | 11 | Arthur Beetson |
| SR | 12 | Gary Stevens |
| LK | 13 | Gary Sullivan |
Substitutions:
| IC | 14 | Fred Jones |
Coach:
(Australia) Harry Bath

The game received a poor attendance of only 4,231 spectators with the French public seemingly uninterested in a final that did not involve French, as evident by the fact only games involving France drew crowds of over 10,000. In fact, the final drew the lowest attendance of the tournament.

The game, however, proved a memorable one for both Great Britain and Australia; seeing Great Britain captain Clive Sullivan's long distance try, and Australia's "greatest try never scored", by fullback Graeme Langlands. The try was disallowed by French referee Georges Jameau for offside but was later proved to be onside. Great Britain hooker Mike Stephenson scored the 73rd-minute try that helped level the scores and secure the World Cup.

Australia winger Ray Branighan missed his 79th-minute penalty, Bob Fulton failed three drop goal attempts in the last five minutes, resulting in a 10–10 scoreline at full time. Scores were again level after extra time.
