= Victor Serrano =

Victor Serrano may refer to:

- Víctor Serrano, Puerto Rican long-distance runner
- Victor Serrano (rugby league), French rugby league player
