= AIIA =

AIIA may refer to:

- Australian Information Industry Association
- Australian Institute of International Affairs, a think tank
- Quorum-quenching N-acyl-homoserine lactonase, an enzyme
