= Data3 =

Data#3 Limited
- Industry: Information technology
- Founded: 1977
- Headquarters: Australia
- Revenue: $2.8 billion (2023/2024)
- Number of employees: 1,400
- Website: http://www.data3.com.au

Data^{#}3 Limited (DTL) is a publicly traded information and communications technology (ICT) company. Data^{#}3's head office is located in Brisbane, but the business operates across Australia.

Data^{#}3's official listing date on the Australian Stock Exchange (ASX) was 23 December 1997. The company's three lines of business include software, infrastructure and services.

Data^{#}3's was founded in 1977 and established by Powell, Clark and Associates (PCA).

== Awards ==
In 2010, John Grant was awarded the Pearcey Medal, Australia’s most prestigious Information and Communications Technology (ICT) industry award to an individual who has made an outstanding life-long commitment to the ICT sector.

In July 2024, Data#3 was inducted into the Queensland Business Leaders Hall of Fame in recognition of continuing excellence and outstanding innovation in the provision of technology solutions and services throughout Australia.
