= Stade Vélodrome =

Multi-purpose stadium in Marseille, France

Coordinates: 43°16′11″N 5°23′45″E

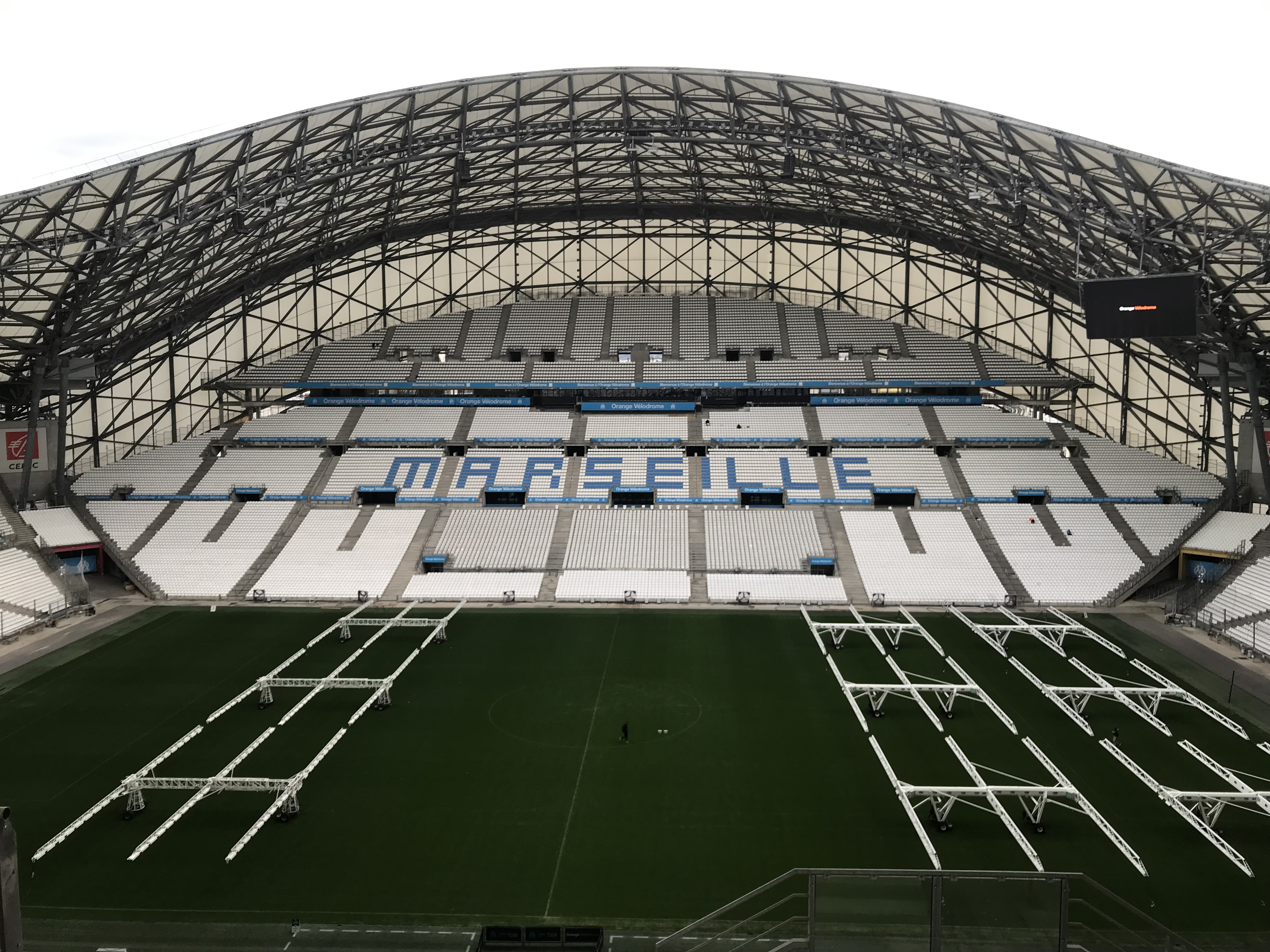
- UEFA
- Interactive map of Stade Vélodrome
- Full name: Stade Vélodrome
- Address: 3 Boulevard Michelet
- Location: Marseille, Bouches-du-Rhône, France
- Owner: City of Marseille
- Operator: Olympique de Marseille
- Capacity: 67,394
- Executive suites: 73
- Surface: AirFibr hybrid grass
- Record attendance: Football: 66,312 (Olympique de Marseille vs. Montpellier HSC, 19 April 2025); Rugby: 66,760 (Toulouse vs. Bordeaux Bègles, 28 June 2024); Concert: 73,158 (Jul, 24 May 2025)
- Field size: 105 × 68 metres (344 ft × 223 ft)
- Public transit: at Rond-Point du Prado at Michelet Huveaune

Construction
- Groundbreaking: April 28, 1935; 91 years ago
- Built: 1935–1937
- Opened: June 13, 1937; 89 years ago
- Renovated: 1984, 1998, 2014
- Architects: Henri Ploquin (original); SCAU (current)
- General contractor: Bouygues Construction

Tenants
- Olympique de Marseille (1937–present); FC Martigues (temporarily); RC Toulon (occasional matches); France national football team (selected matches); France national rugby union team (selected matches)

Website
- cepacvelodrome.com

The Stade Vélodrome (French pronunciation: [stad velɔdʁom]; Occitan: Estadi Vélodrome), known for sponsorship reasons as the CEPAC Vélodrome since July 2026, is a multi-purpose stadium in Marseille, France. It is home to the Olympique de Marseille football club of Ligue 1 since it opened in 1937 and has been a venue in the 1938 and 1998 FIFA World Cups; the 1960, 1984 and 2016 editions of the UEFA European Championship and the 2007 and 2023 Rugby World Cup and football at the 2024 Summer Olympics. It occasionally hosts RC Toulon rugby club of the Top 14. It is the second largest stadium in France, behind Stade de France in Saint-Denis (Paris) with a capacity of 67,394 spectators. The stadium is also used regularly by the France national rugby union team.

The record attendance for a club game before the 2014 renovation at the Stade Vélodrome was 58,897 in a UEFA Cup semi-final against Newcastle United in 2004. Since expansion to 67,394, the record attendance at the ground now stands at 66,312 for the match against Montpellier USC that occurred on 19 April 2025. The first-ever match to be played was between Marseille and Torino in 1937.

The French rugby union team began an impressive run of victories at the stadium in the early 2000s. They defeated New Zealand 42–33 in November 2000, and in 2001 defeated Australia by one point. They beat South Africa in 2002, followed by a win over England in 2003. However, their run of luck was broken in 2004 when they lost 14–24 to Argentina. The venue was used by France for a game against New Zealand in November 2009. In 2018, the stadium hosted its first Six Nations match with France hosting Italy.

France is not the only rugby team to have used the Vélodrome in recent years. On 18 April 2009, Toulon took their home fixture in the Top 14 against Toulouse to the Vélodrome, drawing 57,039 spectators to see a 14–6 Toulon win which played a key role in the Toulonnais' successful fight against relegation in the 2008–09 season. Toulon has taken two home matches to the Vélodrome in each of the succeeding two seasons. The Vélodrome was also the venue for both semi-finals in the 2010–11 Top 14 season, and was used for the Toulon v Munster semi-final of the 2013–14 Heineken Cup.

On 28 May 2022, The Velodrome hosted the 2022 European Rugby Champions Cup Final between La Rochelle v Leinster in front of 59,682 spectators. On 29 June, The Velodrome will host the 2024 Top 14 Final due to the Stade de France being unavailable because of the 2024 Summer Olympics.

The 20th stage of the 2017 Tour de France, an individual time trial through the streets of Marseille, started and finished in the stadium.

== History ==
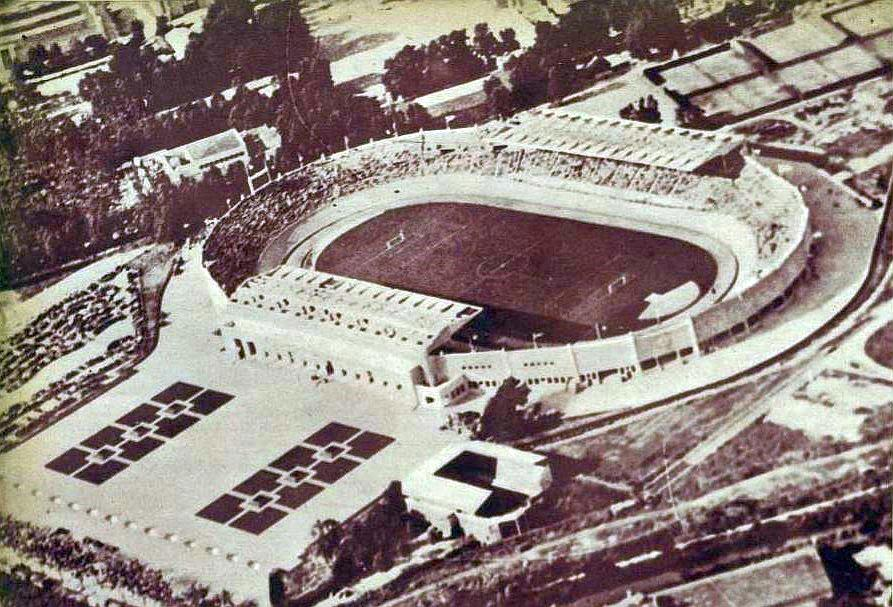
The Vélodrome in 1937.

In 1935, the architectural firm Pollack Ploquin was chosen to build a stadium in Marseille. Henri Ploquin (who designed in 1932 with Charles Bouhana the Stade Municipal Louis Darragon) designed the stadium. For economic reasons, only the Stade Vélodrome was built. On 28 April 1935, the foundation stone was laid for the Vélodrome by Marseille Mayor Ribot, on a site between downtown and the suburban areas of St. Giniez and Sainte-Marguerite on military grounds belonging to the city. The Stade Vélodrome opened on 13 June 1937, when a friendly match was played between Olympique Marseille (OM) and Italian of Torino FC (which ended 2–1 to Olympique Marseille). On 29 August 1937 (the second day of the France national football championship) a match took place between OM and Cannes. This was the first official match at the stadium.

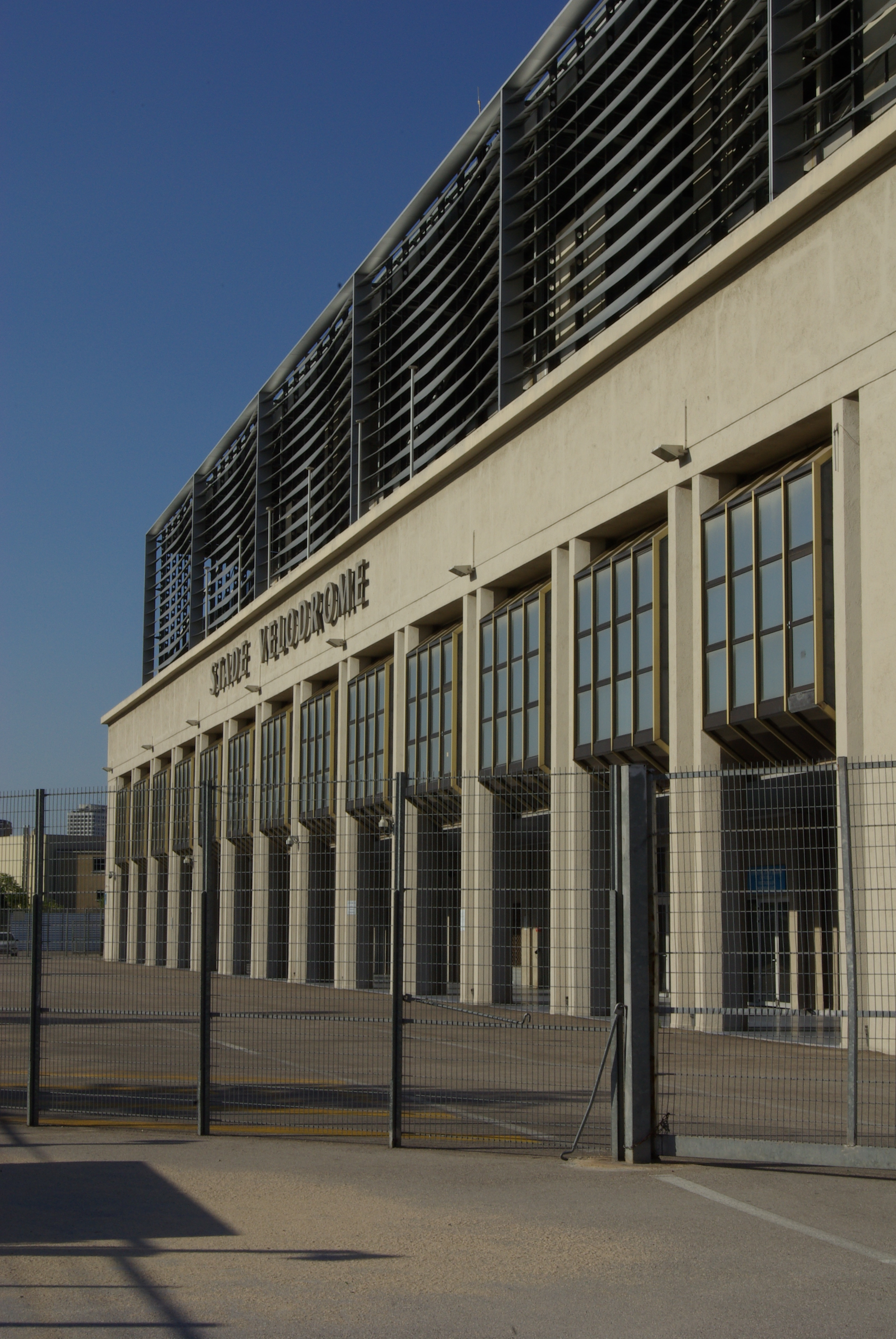
The entrance to the Stade Vélodrome, the only legacy of the 1937 enclosure until its destruction in 2013.

As its name suggests, Stade Vélodrome was used for cycling competitions but as these races became less common, seating replaced the track which circled the stadium. The Vélodrome remained famous for fans of OM (Olympique Marseille) since the sloped track which was under the extended seating acted as a slide to invade the pitch at the end of matches.

Olympique de Marseille was long hostile to the Stade Vélodrome, calling it the "stadium of the City Council". For fans of the Olympians between the wars, the real home of OM was Stade de l'Huveaune, owned by Olympique de Marseille and partly financed by fans in the early 1920s. After World War II, however, Marseille no longer owned the Stadium Huveaune. Seeking support from the city, Chairman Marcel Leclerc had OM play at Huveaune from 1945 to 1960. The City Council then relented, and Olympique de Marseille moved to the Vélodrome. During the 1970s, OM shared the Stade with the Marseille XIII Rugby League.

=== First renovations ===
1970 marked the first modifications to the Vélodrome, with the replacement of the floodlights on the Ganay and Jean-Bouin tribunes by four 60 meter towers for nighttime events. In March 1971, the capacity of the stadium was increased by nearly 6000 seats, with the reduction of the cycling track and the removal of the cinder running track. This brought the total capacity of the stadium to 55,000 people, including the standing area.

Olympique returned to the Stade de l'Huveaune for the 1982–1983 season as Stade Vélodrome was under construction in preparation for the UEFA Euro 1984. The playing surface was completely replaced during this time. The semifinal between France and Portugal had set a record for attendance at an international match with 54,848 spectators. The capacity of the stadium was later reduced to 42,000 with the construction of lodges.

The cycling track was removed altogether once Bernard Tapie was appointed president of OM in 1985. He chose to remove it and rearrange the corners of the stadium, bringing the capacity up to 48,000. This renovation marked the end of the era of Vélodrome as a multi-use facility. The area around the stadium was also transformed with the creation of the second line of the metro which served the stadium from two stations and with the construction of the Palais des Sports nearby.

=== 1998 World Cup and beyond ===
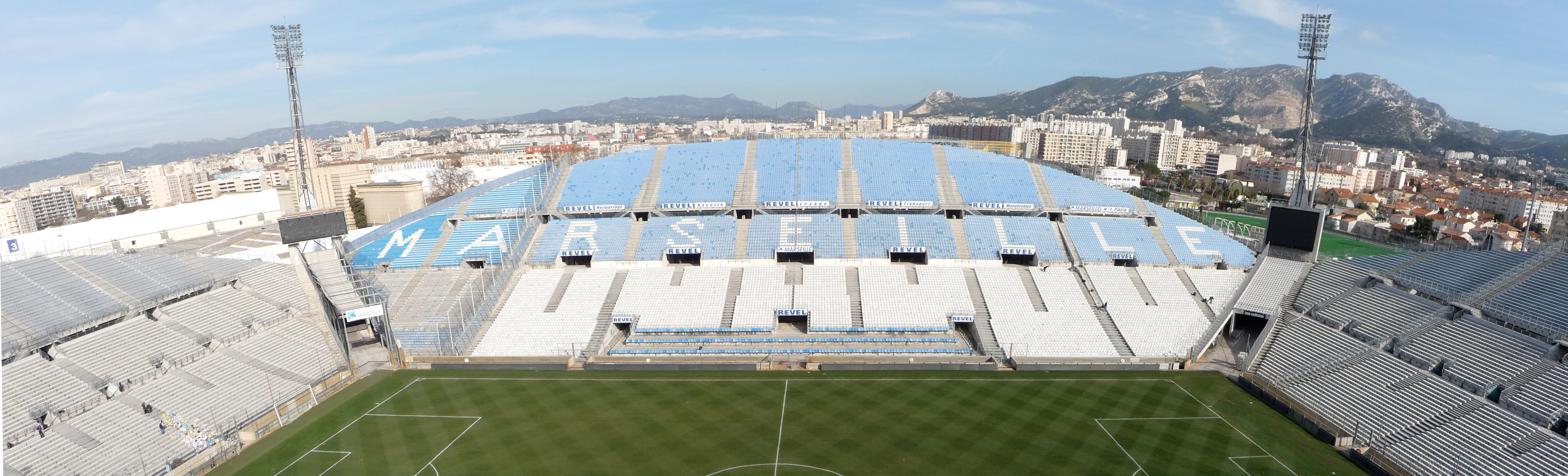
The Stade Vélodrome in its 1998-2011 configuration.

The Stade Vélodrome was completely renovated for the 1998 World Cup; its capacity increased from 42,000 to 60,031 seats (equivalent to 51 km or 32 mi of seats). The Vélodrome hosted the final draw, which took place on 4 December 1997 (the first time the final draw was held in an outdoor venue) and seven matches, including France's first match against South Africa, the quarterfinal between Argentina and the Netherlands and the semifinal between Brazil and the Netherlands. As of 2011, the record attendance for a football game (58,897 spectators) was the Newcastle United UEFA Cup semifinal on 6 May 2004 (2–0). During the 2007 Rugby World Cup the Vélodrome hosted six games, including two quarter-finals: Australia versus England (which holds the overall attendance record with 59,120 spectators) and South Africa versus Fiji. On 16 July 2009, during preparations for a Madonna concert, one of four winches used to hoist the structure failed; the 60-ton roof fell (leaving two dead, eight wounded and crushing a crane).

Widely criticized and unloved by the Marseillais for its architecture (no roof, exposure to strong mistral winds and poor acoustics), the Stade Vélodrome has since 2003 been the subject of several projects to modernize and enlarge it. In July 2009, following an extraordinary council of the City of Marseille concerning the City Hall renovation project, a motion was passed launching a public-private partnership (PPP). On 21 June 2010, following France's winning bid for UEFA Euro 2016, Marseille announced that the stadium would receive another renovation (a roof and an increase in capacity from 60,031 to 67,000), making it a UEFA Elite Stadium. Works began in the spring of 2011 and were completed in summer 2014.

== Attendance ==
In 2002, Division 1 was renamed Ligue 1. Olympique de Marseille's average attendance for each season since 1998–99 is listed below.

Season	Average	Division
1998–99	49,726	Division 1
1999–2000	51,686	Division 1
2000–01	50,755	Division 1
2001–02	50,030	Division 1
2002–03	48,233	Ligue 1
2003–04	47,203	Ligue 1
2004–05	49,970	Ligue 1
2005–06	42,753	Ligue 1
2006–07	47,715	Ligue 1
2007–08	48,784	Ligue 1
2008–09	50,134	Ligue 1
2009–10	48,912	Ligue 1
2010–11	50,500	Ligue 1
2011–12	35,937	Ligue 1
2012–13	29,383	Ligue 1
2013–14	44,375	Ligue 1
2014–15	53,733	Ligue 1
2015–16	37,682	Ligue 1
2016–17	41,650	Ligue 1
2017–18	42,733	Ligue 1
2018–19	43,458	Ligue 1
2019–20	52,805 (of 14 matches played)	Ligue 1
2020–21	N/A	Ligue 1
2021–22	52,193	Ligue 1
2022–23	62,571	Ligue 1
2023–24	60,799	Ligue 1
2024–25	63,682	Ligue 1
2025–26	62,612	Ligue 1

== Tournament results ==
=== 1938 FIFA World Cup ===
Date	Time (WEST)	Team #1	Result	Team #2	Round	Attendance
5 June 1938	17:00	Italy	2–1 (a.e.t.)	Norway	Round of 16	18,000
16 June 1938	18:00	Italy	2–1	Brazil	Semi-finals	30,000

=== 1960 European Nations' Cup ===
Date	Time (CET)	Team #1	Result	Team #2	Round	Attendance
6 July 1960	21:30	Czechoslovakia	0–3	Soviet Union	Semi-finals	25,184
9 July 1960	18:00	Czechoslovakia	2–0	France	Third place play-off	9,438

=== UEFA Euro 1984 ===
Date	Time (CEST)	Team #1	Result	Team #2	Round	Attendance
17 June 1984	20:30	Portugal	1–1	Spain	Group 2	24,364
23 June 1984	20:00	France	3–2 (a.e.t.)	Portugal	Semi-finals	54,848

=== 1998 FIFA World Cup ===
Date	Time (CEST)	Team #1	Result	Team #2	Round	Attendance
12 June 1998	21:00	France	3–0	South Africa	Group C	55,077
15 June 1998	14:30	England	2–0	Tunisia	Group G	54,587
20 June 1998	21:00	Netherlands	5–0	South Korea	Group E	55,000
23 June 1998	21:00	Brazil	1–2	Norway	Group A	55,000
27 June 1998	16:00	Italy	1–0	Norway	Round of 16	55,000
4 July 1998	16:00	Netherlands	2–1	Argentina	Quarter-finals	55,000
7 July 1998	21:00	Brazil	1–1 (a.e.t.) (4–2 p)	Netherlands	Semi-finals	55,000

=== 2007 Rugby World Cup ===
The Vélodrome hosted six games of the 2007 Rugby World Cup, including two quarter-final games.

Date	Competition	Home team		Away team		Attendance
8 September 2007	2007 Rugby World Cup Pool C	New Zealand	76	Italy	14	58,612
12 September 2007	2007 Rugby World Cup Pool C	Italy	24	Romania	18	44,241
22 September 2007	2007 Rugby World Cup Pool D	Argentina	63	Namibia	3	55,067
30 September 2007	2007 Rugby World Cup Pool D	France	64	Georgia	7	58,695
6 October 2007	2007 Rugby World Cup Quarter-finals	Australia	10	England	12	59,102
7 October 2007	2007 Rugby World Cup Quarter-finals	South Africa	37	Fiji	20	55,943

=== UEFA Euro 2016 ===
The Vélodrome hosted six games at UEFA Euro 2016, including a semi-final. In 2016, the stadium became the first in Europe to have hosted three European Championship semi-finals after France's previous hosting of the tournament in 1960 and 1984.

Date	Time (CEST)	Team #1	Result	Team #2	Round	Attendance
11 June 2016	21:00	England	1–1	Russia	Group B	62,343
15 June 2016	21:00	France	2–0	Albania	Group A	63,670
18 June 2016	18:00	Iceland	1–1	Hungary	Group F	60,842
21 June 2016	21:00	Ukraine	0–1	Poland	Group C	58,874
30 June 2016	21:00	Poland	1–1 (a.e.t.) (3–5 p)	Portugal	Quarter-finals	62,940
7 July 2016	21:00	Germany	0–2	France	Semi-finals	64,078

=== 2023 Rugby World Cup ===
Date	Time (CEST)	Team #1	Result	Team #2	Round	Attendance
9 September 2023	21:00	England	27–10	Argentina	Pool D	63,118
10 September 2023	17:45	South Africa	18–3	Scotland	Pool B	63,586
21 September 2023	21:00	France	96–0	Namibia	Pool A	63,486
1 October 2023	21:00	South Africa	49–18	Tonga	Pool B	60,000
14 October 2023	17:00	Wales	17–29	Argentina	Quarter-finals	62,576
15 October 2023	17:00	England	30–24	Fiji	Quarter-finals	61,863

=== 2024 Summer Olympics ===
Date	Team #1	Result	Team #2	Round	Attendance
24 July 2024	France	3–0	United States	Men's group A	48,721
25 July 2024	Germany	3–0	Australia	Women's group B	9,731
27 July 2024	New Zealand	1–4	United States	Men's group A	9,468
28 July 2024	United States	4–1	Germany	Women's group B	12,845
30 July 2024	New Zealand	0–3	France	Men's group A	45,790
31 July 2024	Australia	1–2	United States	Women's group B	13,036
2 August 2024	Egypt	1–1 (a.e.t.) (5–4 p)	Paraguay	Men's quarter-finals	23,753
3 August 2024	Canada	0–0 (a.e.t.) (2–4 p)	Germany	Women's quarter-finals	12,517
5 August 2024	Morocco	1–2	Spain	Men's semi-finals	59,882
6 August 2024	Brazil	4–2	Spain	Women's semi-finals	14,201

== Structure ==
1	Tribune Jean-Bouin
2	Virage Sud Chevalier Roze
3	Tribune Ganay
4	Virage Nord De Peretti
5	Disabled seating (258 seats)
6	Press gallery
7	Loges
8	Rostrum
9	VIP hall
10	Projectors
11	Local
12	Closets
13	Offices
14	TV studio
15	Big screens

The four stands in the stadium are named after athletes (runner Jean Bouin and 1920s cyclist Gustave Ganay), a historical figure of the 1720 plague epidemic (Chevalier Roze) and a popular Olympique de Marseille supporter (Patrice De Peretti, nicknamed "Depe", who died suddenly in July 2000).

== Rugby League ==
Other than the Rugby League World Cup games in 1954, 1972 and 1975, 14 other test matches were played at the stadium between 1938 and 1985. The France national team played in 16 of the internationals played at Stade Vélodrome. Four of the five international crowds between 1948 and 1951 constituted full houses of approximately 32,000, as rugby league remained the dominant rugby code in Marseille at the time.

=== Rugby League World Cup ===
Over three separate tournaments, the Vélodrome hosted games of the Rugby League World Cup.

Date	Competition	Home team		Away team		Attendance
7 November 1954	1954 Rugby League World Cup group stage	Australia	34	New Zealand	15	20,000
28 October 1972	1972 Rugby League World Cup group stage	France	20	New Zealand	9	20,748
17 October 1975	1975 Rugby League World Cup group stage	France	12	New Zealand	12	10,000

=== Rugby League Test matches ===
List of rugby league test matches played at Stade Vélodrome.

Test#	Date	Result	Attendance	Notes
1	16 January 1938	Australia def. France 16–11	23,100	1938 France vs Australia series
2	18 January 1947	France def. Wales 14–5	24,500	1946–47 European Rugby League Championship
3	11 April 1948	England def. France 25–10	32,000	1947–48 European Rugby League Championship
4	9 January 1949	Australia def. France 29–10	15,796	1949 France vs Australia series
5	10 April 1949	France def. Wales 11–0	30,000	1948–49 European Rugby League Championship
6	15 January 1950	France def. Other Nationalities 8–3	30,000	1949–50 European Rugby League Championship
7	15 April 1950	France def. Wales 28–13	16,860	1950–51 European Rugby League Championship
8	25 November 1951	France def. England 42–13	31,810	1951–52 European Rugby League Championship
9	23 November 1952	France def. Other Nationalities 29–10	17,611	1949–50 European Rugby League Championship
10	13 December 1953	France def. Wales 23–22	25,000	1953–54 European Rugby League Championship
11	15 November 1965	France def. New Zealand 14–3	30,431	1965 France vs New Zealand series
12	17 December 1967	France drew with Australia 7–7	5,193	1967–68 France vs Australia series
13	20 December 1981	France def. Great Britain 19–2	6,500	
14	24 November 1985	New Zealand def. France 22–0	1,492	1985 France vs New Zealand series

== Location and accessibility ==
The stadium is four kilometres from the Old Port of Marseille, in the neighbourhoods of Sainte-Marguerite and Saint-Giniez in the southern part of Marseille. It is bound to the south by the Huveaune river and to the north by the Parc Chanot and the headquarters of regional public TV station, France 3 Provence-Alpes. To its west runs the Boulevard Michelet and to the east the Marseille Palais des Sports and the Delort stadium.

The Vélodrome is serviced by the bus and metro networks of the Régie des transports de Marseille. Besides several bus services operating in the area, two stations of the Marseille Metro line 2 are close to the stadium. Supporters wishing to reach the Ganay or North stands must alight at the Sainte-Marguerite Dromel station whereas the Rond-Point du Prado station caters for the South stand and the Jean-Bouin stand. This line, which also serves the Marseille Saint-Charles train station, has additional trains on matchdays.

Marseille Provence Airport is thirty kilometres from the Vélodrome.

== Current situation ==
The Stade Vélodrome has increased its seating capacity in 2014 (in prevision of the UEFA Euro 2016 hosted by France), and continues to host games for Olympique de Marseille. Previously it held 60,031 spectators; following its renovation, it is now able to hold 67,000, including 7,000 VIP seats. The cost of the project was €267 million. The expansion and modernization of equipment was part of the French bid to organize Euro 2016. Marseille mayor Jean-Claude Gaudin's bid also provided for the creation of a new district.

=== Construction ===
Marseille has increased the stadium's capacity and installed a roof, as required by UEFA standards. The project also includes multiple reception areas and media space, better access for the disabled and better seating. The new stadium has been officially inaugurated on 16 October 2014.

=== Approaches ===
The esplanade Ganay has been preserved and refurbished. The RTM car park has been replaced with office towers and housing. RTM users benefit from a larger underground car park. Trees and wind turbines contribute to a new-neighbourhood HQE (high environmental quality).

=== Cost ===
The total project estimate is €267 million, with €150M for the stadium and the remnant for the surrounding shopping mall, hotel and housing, the private sector to cover two-thirds of the investment; the remainder will be shared by the region, the department of Bouches-du-Rhône, MPM and the city of Marseille for 20m euros. The French government contributed to upgrade the area's infrastructure. After several studies, the mayor selected the contract of partnership arrangements included in a PPP (public-private partnership).

=== Olympique de Marseille ===
"Olympique de Marseille will be closely associated with the project", said Jean-Claude Gaudin. The club remains a tenant of the stadium. Elected officials want ticket prices to be controlled.

=== Naming rights ===
The naming rights for the stadium were bought by French telecommunications multinational Orange. The 10-year-deal was announced on 3 June 2016 by the Mayor of Marseille. The deal is reported to be worth €2.7 million annually.

During the 2024 Olympics, it was called Marseille Stadium due to the ban by the International Olympic Committee on venues with corporate names.

In June 2026, the naming rights were bought by BPCE Group, who opted to use the Caisse d'Épargne PAC name, which will rename the stadium to the CEPAC Vélodrome starting 2 July 2026.

== Concerts ==
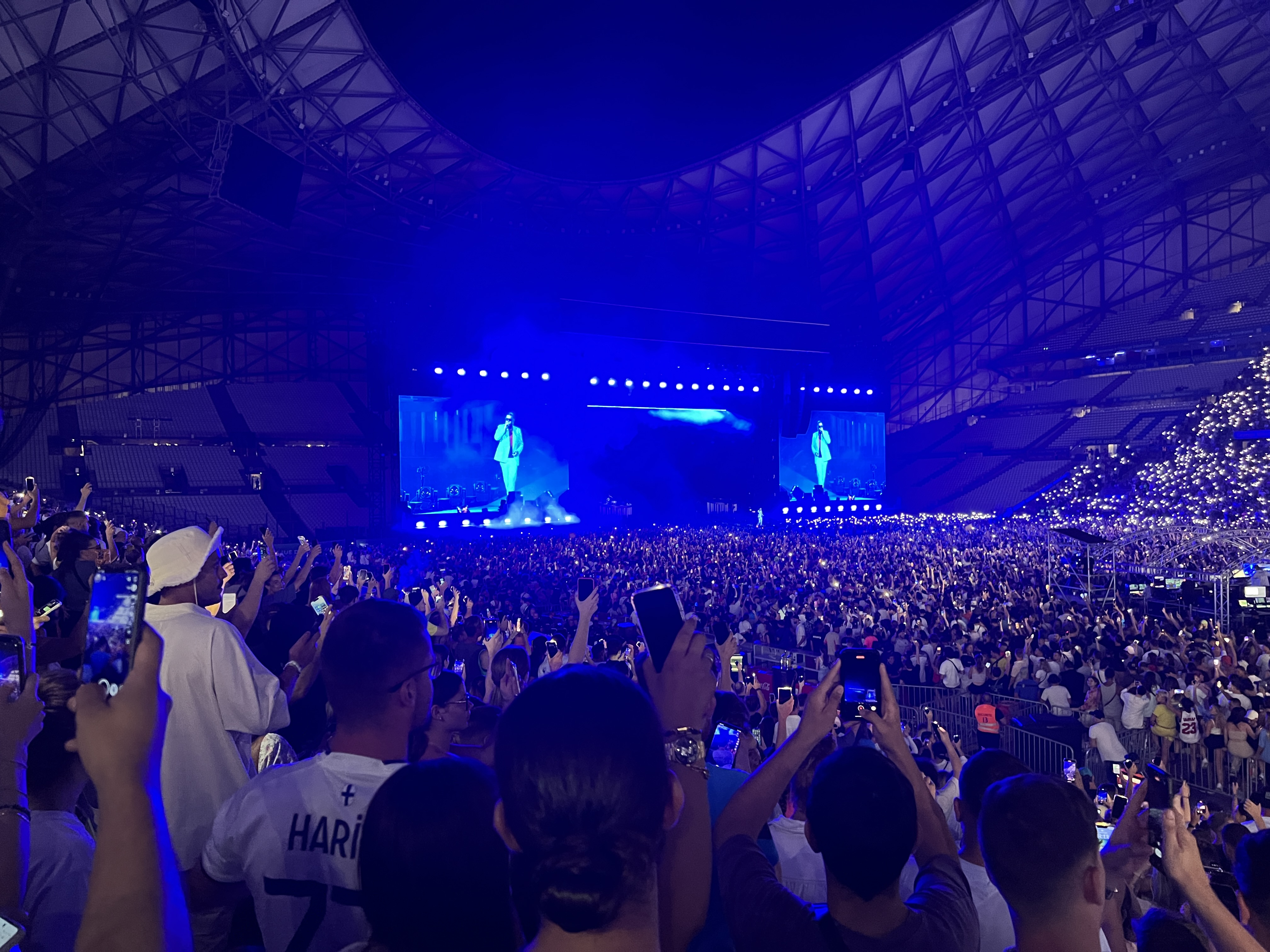
SCH at the Orange Vélodrome, 2023.

Concerts at Stade Vélodrome
Date	Artist	Tour	Attendance	Revenues
5 September 1980	Julio Iglesias	–	3,500	–
18 May 1983	Joan Baez	–	–	–
21 November 1984	Metallica	Bang That Head That Doesn't Bang	–	–
18 July 1989	Pink Floyd	A Momentary Lapse of Reason Tour	–	–
20 June 1990	The Rolling Stones	Steel Wheels/Urban Jungle Tour	–	–
14 July 1993	U2	Zoo TV Tour	–	–
5 September 1993	Jean-Michel Jarre	Europe In Concert	40,000	–
16 July 2000	Johnny Hallyday	100% Johnny Hallyday	50,000	–
15 June 2002	Luciano Pavarotti	–	25,000	–
5 July 2003	The Rolling Stones	Licks Tour	–	–
3 June 2008	The Police	The Police Reunion Tour	47,337	$5,290,050
9 June 2009	AC/DC	Black Ice World Tour	57,000	$5,123,160
5 June 2015	Paul McCartney	Out There	–	–
13 May 2016	AC/DC	Rock or Bust World Tour	60,000	–
18 July 2017	Céline Dion	Céline Dion Live 2017	43,128	$5,095,778
26 June 2018	The Rolling Stones	No Filter Tour	53,409	$9,591,041
9 July 2019	Muse	Simulation Theory World Tour	55,330	$4,432,254
12 October 2019	Soprano	Phoenix Tour	–	–
4 June 2022	Jul	Jul en Concert	52,000	–
11 June 2022	Indochine	Central Tour	59,400	–
18 June 2022	Soprano	Chasseur D'Étoiles Tour	–	–
19 June 2022	Soprano	Chasseur D'Étoiles Tour	–	–
11 June 2023	Beyoncé	Renaissance World Tour	56,352	$7,070,570
8 July 2023	Mylène Farmer	Nevermore 2023	48,000	–
15 July 2023	Muse	Will of the People World Tour	51,000	–
22 July 2023	SCH	Decennium Tour	53,400	–
8 June 2024	Rammstein	Rammstein Stadium Tour	53,000	–
23 May 2025	Jul	–	73,128	–
24 May 2025	Jul	–	73,158	–
31 May 2025	Bruce Springsteen & E Street Band	Land of Hope & Dreams Tour	61,613	–
6 June 2025	Ed Sheeran	+–=÷× Tour	71,500	–
7 June 2025	Ed Sheeran	+–=÷× Tour	71,500	–
1 July 2026	Bad Bunny	Debí Tirar Más Fotos World Tour	–	–

== Gallery ==
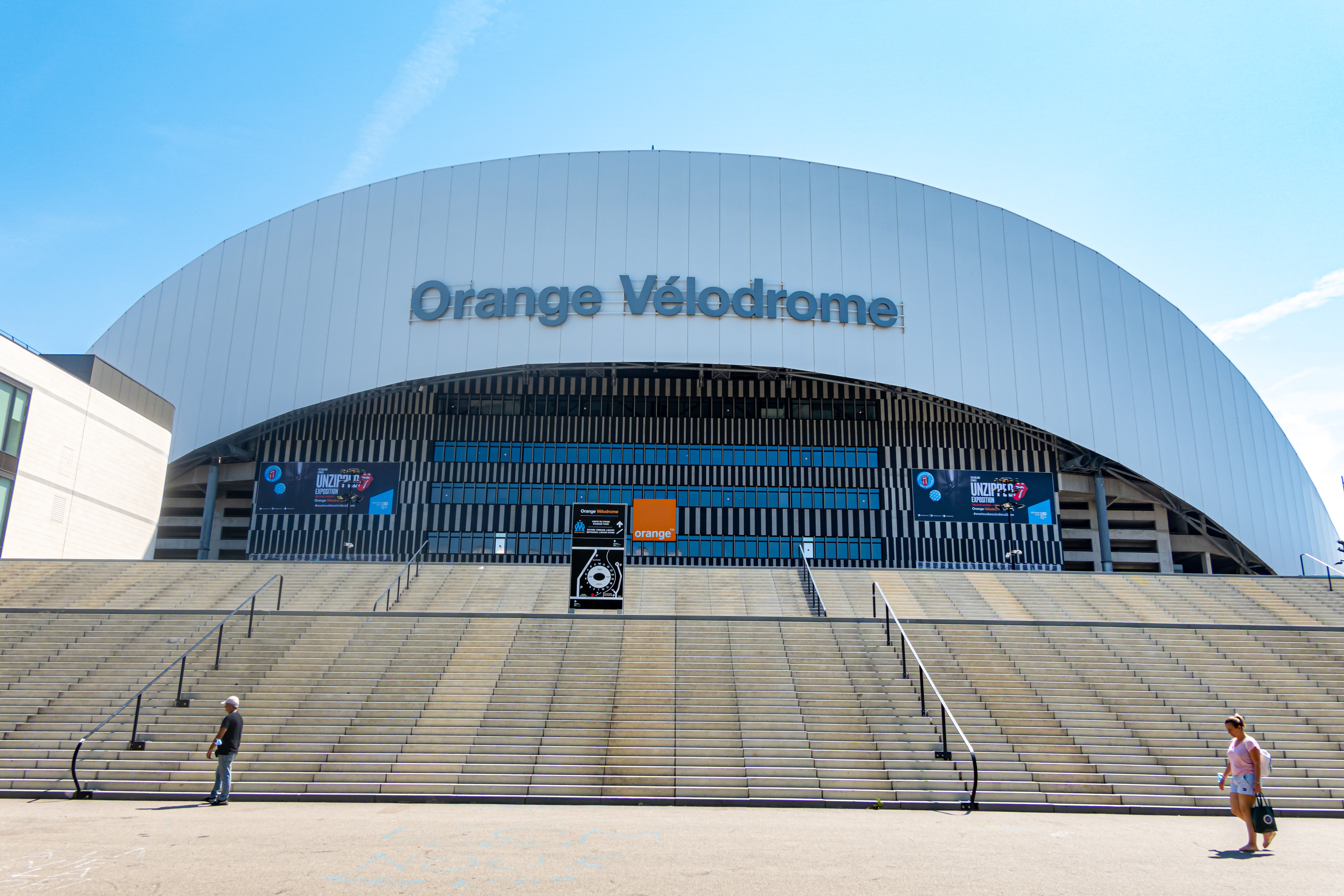
Main entrance facing the Boulevard Michelet

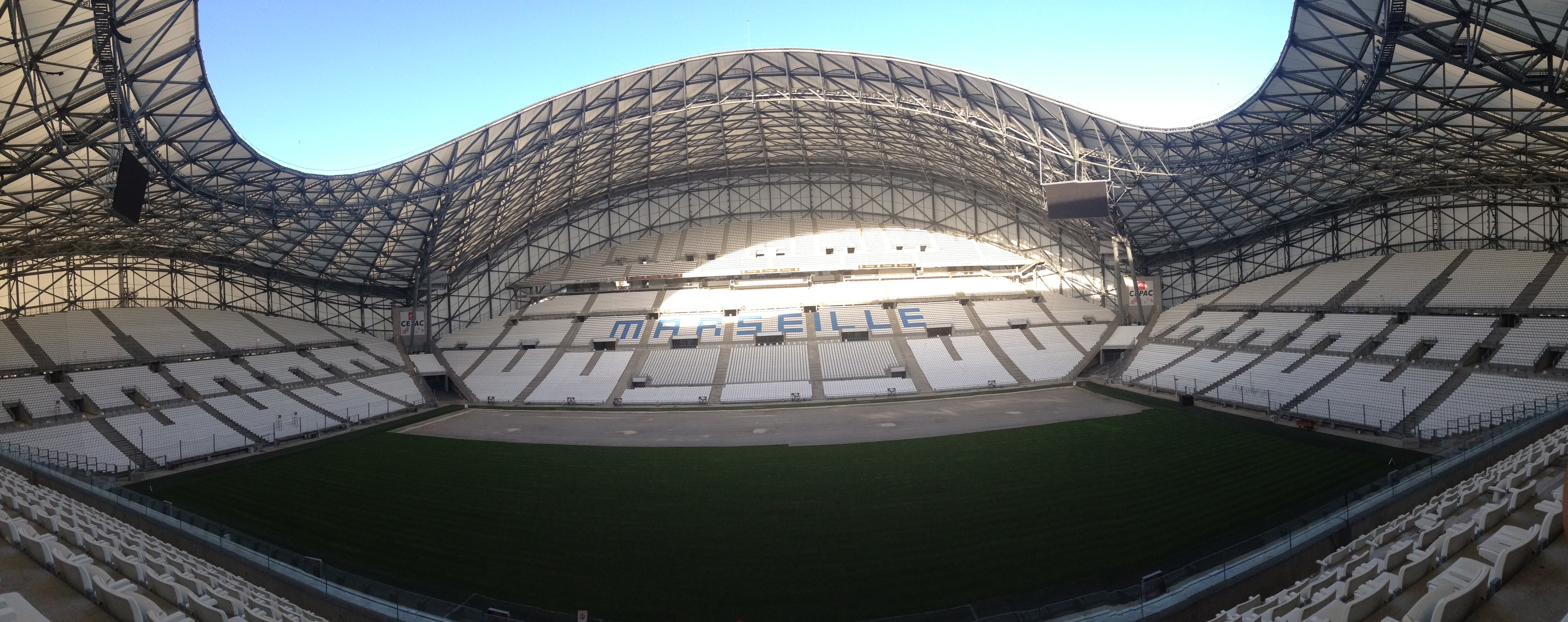
Inside the stadium

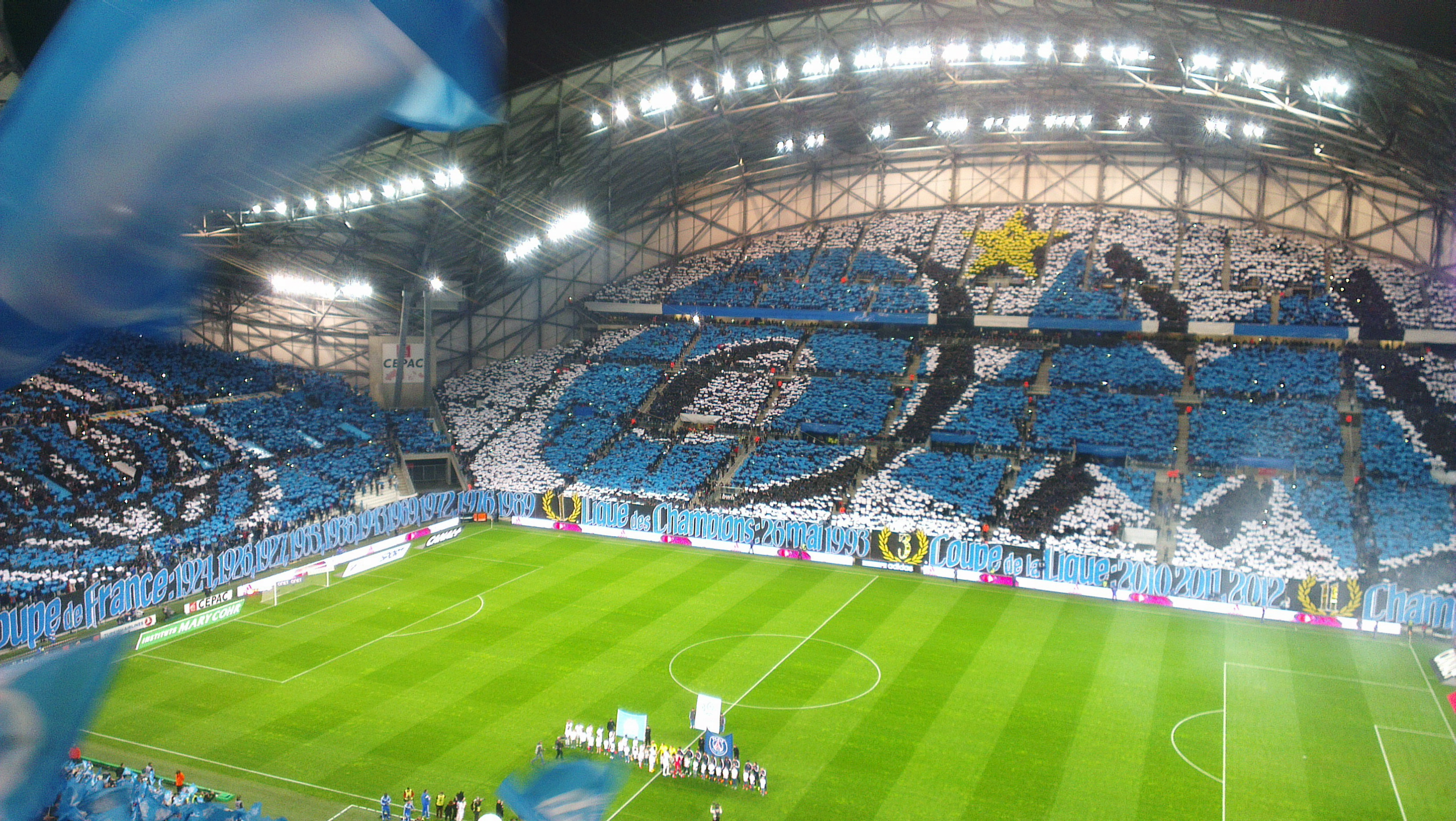
Fans demonstration before a match against Paris Saint-Germain

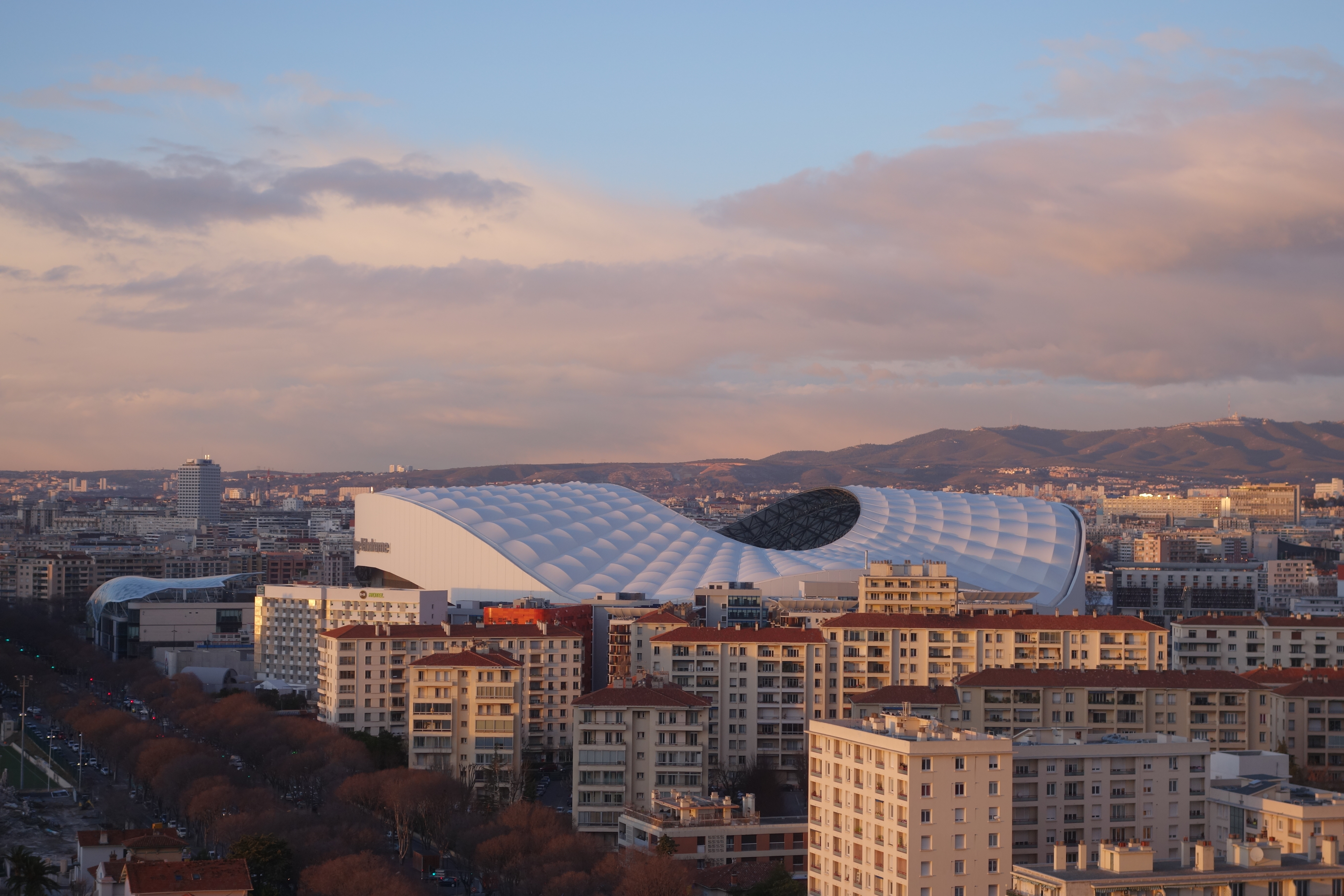
Aerial view of the stadium

== See also ==
- List of football stadiums in France
- List of European stadiums by capacity
- List of association football stadiums by capacity
- Lists of stadiums

Preceded by Lugi Ganna Velodrome; Varese	UCI Track Cycling World Championships; Venue; 1972	Succeeded by Velódromo de Anoeta; San Sebastián
