= John Elford =

Australia international rugby league footballer (1947–2024)

Personal information
- Born: 1 March 1947 Casino, New South Wales, Australia
- Died: 4 February 2024 (aged 76)

Playing information
- Position: Second-row
Club
Years	Team	Pld	T	G	FG	P
1966–76	Western Suburbs	116	14	0	0	42
Representative
Years	Team	Pld	T	G	FG	P
1972	New South Wales	1	0	0	0	0
1972	Australia	4	2	0	0	6

John Elford (1 March 1947 – 4 February 2024) was an Australian rugby league footballer who played in the 1960s and 1970s. He played his entire first grade Australian club football for Western Suburbs and also played for both the New South Wales and Australia representative sides. A New South Wales Rugby League obituary described him as "[a] great defender and a confident ball player."

== Personal life ==
Elford was born in Casino, New South Wales, Australia. Elford was a surf lifesaving sprint champion before starting his professional league career. He died on 4 February 2024, at the age of 76.

== Career ==
Scouted by Noel Kelly, he came to the Western Suburbs club in 1966 as a winger but later was shifted to the forwards where he remained the rest of his career. By 1968 he was playing on the wing for Sydney Seconds.

In 1969 Elford appealed against the league's transfer and retention system, that prevented him from joining another club. He claimed that players had attended training with the "smell of alcohol on their breath," and they, "later became sick on the field." He went on to accuse a coach of wanting, "to fight everyone in the first grade behind a shed, one at a time" He took no part in the 1969 season.

Despite his previous problems with Magpies, he signed a contract to stay with the club for five years at the start of 1972. Later that year he made his representative debut for New South Wales, in what was described as, "a powerhouse display," by, "a rugged young second-rower who delights in the role of crashing defence and can split the opposition in attacking bursts."

Elford was then subsequently selected for the Australian national side that same year, scoring two tries in a match against New Zealand. He would be selected for the Australian side in the 1972 Rugby League World Cup held in France but broke his arm in a warm-up fixture prior to the tournament and could not take part. He is listed on the Australian Players Register as Kangaroo No. 461.

His promising career was however often halted by injuries, and he was forced out of the entire 1973 season. In 1975, the tendons were operated on and he had a new plate placed in his arm. His career finished in 1976 after another broken arm.

After his retirement from Sydney football, he returned to captain/coach his junior club, the Smithtown Tigers. They won a premiership in 1977 and lost a grand final in 1978.

== Sources ==
- Alan Whiticker & Glen Hudson (2007). The Encyclopedia of Rugby League Players. Wetherill Park, New South Wales: Gary Allen Pty Ltd. ISBN 978-1-877082-93-1.
