= Brian Tracey =

New Zealand rugby league footballer and coach (born 1942)

Personal information
- Full name: Brian John Tracey
- Born: 15 November 1942 (age 83) Auckland, New Zealand

Playing information
- Position: Scrum-half
Club
Years	Team	Pld	T	G	FG	P
196?–7?	Ponsonby
Representative
Years	Team	Pld	T	G	FG	P
19??–??	Auckland
1972	New Zealand	3	0	0	0	0

Coaching information
Club
Years	Team	Gms	W	D	L	W%
198?–8?	Te Atatu

Brian John Tracey (born 1942) is a New Zealand former professional rugby league footballer who represented New Zealand in the 1972 World Cup.

== Playing career ==
Tracey played for the Ponsonby club in the Auckland Rugby League competition.

In 1972, Tracey was selected in the New Zealand national rugby league team squad for the World Cup and went on to play in all three matches at the tournament.

In 1973 Tracey was part of the Auckland side that won the national Rothmans trophy.

== Coaching career ==
Tracey later coached the Te Atatu Roosters in the Auckland Rugby League competition, sharing the Hyland Memorial Cup as best coach with Mount Albert's Mike McLennan in 1984 and winning it outright in 1986.
