= Michel Anglade =

French rugby league player (1946–2025)

Personal information
- Born: 12 October 1946 Auch, France
- Died: 21 April 2025 (aged 78)

Playing information

Rugby union
- Position: Flanker
Club
Years	Team	Pld	T	G	FG	P
1967–72	Tarbes

Rugby league
- Position: Loose forward
Club
Years	Team	Pld	T	G	FG	P
1972–76	Saint-Gaudens
Representative
Years	Team	Pld	T	G	FG	P
1972–75	France	5

Michel Anglade (12 October 1946 – 21 April 2025) was a French rugby union and league player.

== Rugby union career ==
=== Club level ===
Before switching to rugby league, Anglade played for Tarbes between 1967 and 1972, playing as flanker, with said team, he reached the semi-final of the 1967-68 French Rugby Union Championship against Lourdes in Bordeaux.

== Rugby league career ==
In 1972, Anglade switched codes to rugby league, joining Saint-Gaudens, where he played as lock forward between 1972 and 1976, with which he won the French Rugby League Championship in 1974 against US Villeneuve by 21–8. He also represented his country at the 1972 and 1975 Rugby League World Cups.

== Death ==
Anglade died on 21 April 2025, at the age of 78.

=== Clubs ===
- Saint-Gaudens (1972–1976)

==== Club honours ====
- French Champion in 1973–74 (Saint-Gaudens)
- Lord Derby Cup in 1972-73 (Saint-Gaudens)

=== International level ===
- 7 caps for France 1972–1975, against :
  - New Zealand : 1972, 1975,
  - Australia : 1972,
  - England : 1975,
  - Wales : 1975.
