= Bob Paul (rugby league) =

New Zealand international rugby league footballer

Personal information
- Full name: Robert Henry Paul
- Born: 6 December 1942 (age 82); New Zealand

Playing information
- Position: Prop, Second-row
Representative
Years	Team	Pld	T	G	FG	P
	Wellington
1972	New Zealand	3	0	0	0	0

Bob Paul is a New Zealand former rugby league footballer who represented New Zealand in the 1972 World Cup.

== Playing career ==
Paul played for Wellington. In 1972 he was selected for the New Zealand national rugby league team. He played in three test matches, one against Australia and two at the 1972 World Cup.

He played for the New Zealand Māori side in 1972.
