= Phil Lowe =

English rugby league footballer (1950–2024)

Personal information
- Full name: Philip Thomas Lowe
- Born: 19 January 1950 Kingston upon Hull, East Riding of Yorkshire, England
- Died: 20 March 2024 (aged 74)

Playing information
- Height: 6 ft 2 in (1.88 m)
- Weight: 16 st 3 lb (103 kg)
- Position: Second-row
Club
Years	Team	Pld	T	G	FG	P
1967–83	Hull Kingston Rovers	418	179	0	0	537
1974–76	Manly Sea Eagles	72	25	0	0	75
	Total	490	204	0	0	612
Representative
Years	Team	Pld	T	G	FG	P
1968–78	Yorkshire	4	2	0	0	6
1970–81	England	5	2	0	0	6
1970–78	Great Britain	12	8	0	0	24

Coaching information
Club
Years	Team	Gms	W	D	L	W%
1983–87	York

Philip Thomas Lowe (19 January 1950 – 20 March 2024) was an English professional rugby league footballer and coach who played in the 1960s, 1970s and 1980s as a second-row forward. He was a member of Great Britain's 1972 World Cup winning team, and also represented England, and Yorkshire. At club level he played for Hull Kingston Rovers and Manly-Warringah Sea Eagles, and coached at York F.C. after finishing his playing career.

Teammate Mike Stephenson recalled, "Phil had a magnificent physique. He had a high leg movement and the ability to stride out of a tackle. A giant of a man and a brilliant exponent of a forward running out wide in the centre areas".

== Background ==
Lowe was born in Hull, East Riding of Yorkshire, England to his father Herbert William, a bricklayer, and his mother Marion, a kitchen supervisor.

== Club career ==
=== Hull Kingston Rovers ===
Lowe played at second-row in Hull Kingston Rovers' 8–7 victory over Hull F.C. in the 1967–68 Yorkshire Cup Final during the 1967–68 season at Headingley, Leeds on Saturday 14 October 1967. Lowe was Hull Kingston Rovers's 'Player of the Season' in 1968–69.

Lowe was a member of the 1970 Great Britain Lions tour, the last British Ashes winning squad, making his international debut on the New Zealand leg of the tour, scoring twice on his debut in a 33–16 in Auckland. The Ashes, similar to the cricket series of the same name, is a best-of-three series of test matches between the English (previously British) and Australian national rugby league football teams. Whilst playing for Hull Kingston Rovers, Lowe helped Great Britain to victory in the 1972 Rugby League World Cup final. Lowe was again Hull Kingston Rovers's 'Player of the Season' in 1972–73. His 26 tries in the 1972–73 season was a club record by a Hull Kingston Rovers forward, beating William Sandham's 25 tries scored in the 1912–13 season. During the 1973 Kangaroo tour of Great Britain and France Lowe was selected to play in all three Ashes test matches against the Australians.

=== Manly ===
In 1974, Lowe was lured to Australia by Manly-Warringah secretary Ken Arthurson to play for the two-time defending Sydney premiers, with Manly paying Hull Kingston Rovers a £15,000 transfer fee. There he joined fellow Great Britain international Mal Reilly, and hard hitting local junior Terry Randall in what was one of the strongest back rows in the Sydney premiership. He played three seasons in the New South Wales Rugby League premiership, including, their victory in the 1976 NSWRFL season's Grand Final over Parramatta, scoring his team's only try of the match. Among his teammates that day included Australian internationals Graham Eadie, Russel Gartner, Bob Fulton, and Terry Randall as well as fellow Englishmen Gary Stephens and Steve "Knocker" Norton. In three seasons with the Sea Eagles, Lowe played 72 games and scored 25 tries.

=== Hull KR / Manly dispute ===
In April 1977, Lowe became involved in a dispute between Manly and Hull KR. Manly claimed that they signed Lowe for a further two seasons, but Hull KR refused to release Lowe unless they were paid an additional fee of £10,000. The matter had been referred to the International Board, and the Rugby League Council requested Hull KR not to select Lowe until a ruling had been made. After seeking legal advice, the club played Lowe in the first round of the 1976–77 Premiership in a 18–13 win against Warrington, but the Council subsequently expelled Rovers from the tournament.

In June 1977, Manly agreed to cancel Lowe's contract, with Rovers paying an undisclosed fee as compensation. In July 1977, the High Court ruled that the League's ban on Lowe "was unlawful, or outside the League's bylaws", and granted an injunction which prevented any disciplinary action being taken against Hull KR on the matter.

Lowe was also selected for the 1977 World Cup, but withdrew due to the ongoing contract dispute between Hull KR and Manly.

=== Return to Hull KR ===
Lowe played at second-row in Hull Kingston Rovers' 26–11 victory over St. Helens in the 1977 BBC2 Floodlit Trophy Final during the 1977–78 season at Craven Park, Hull on Tuesday 13 December 1977. Lowe played at second-row in the 3–13 defeat by Hull F.C. in the 1979 BBC2 Floodlit Trophy Final during the 1979–80 season at the Boulevard on Tuesday 18 December 1979. Lowe was a member of the Hull Kingston Rovers squad that won the Rugby League Championship in 1978–79 season.

Lowe played at second-row in Hull Kingston Rovers' 10–5 victory over Hull F.C. in the 1979–80 Challenge Cup Final at Wembley Stadium on 3 May 1980. During the 1980 New Zealand rugby league tour of Great Britain and France Lowe played for Hull KR against New Zealand. His testimonial match at Hull Kingston Rovers took place in 1981, and during the 1982 Kangaroo tour of Great Britain and France, Lowe was selected as a reserve in Hull KR's match against the Australians.

Lowe played at second-row in the 7–8 defeat by Leeds in the 1980–81 Yorkshire Cup Final on 8 November 1980, in the 9–18 defeat by Widnes in the 1980–81 Challenge Cup Final on 2 May 1981, in Hull Kingston Rovers' 11–7 victory over Hull F.C. in the 1980–81 Premiership Final at Headingley on 16 May 1981, and in Hull Kingston Rovers' 4–12 defeat by Hull F.C. in the 1981–82 John Player Trophy Final at Headingley on 23 January 1982.

== Coaching career ==
Lowe announced his retirement from playing in February 1983, and the following March, began a coaching spell at York, assisting them to both promotion and a place in the semi-finals of the Challenge Cup. He resigned in March 1987. He also undertook the role as a director of Hull Kingston Rovers. In 1995, he was the manager of England's Rugby League World Cup team.

== Personal life ==
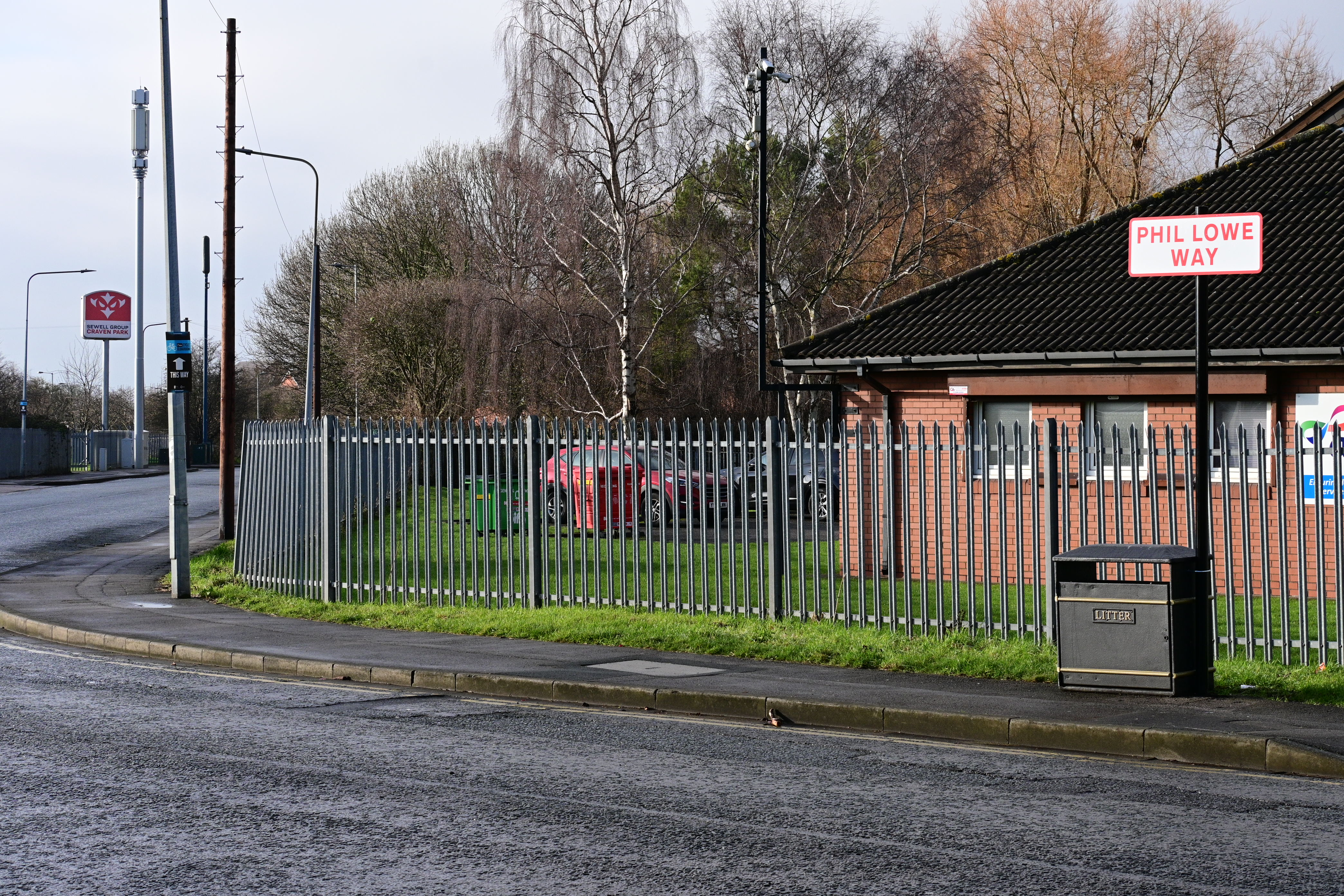
The street leading to Hull Kingston Rovers' Craven Park stadium was renamed Phil Lowe Way in December 2025

Lowe was married to his wife Avril whom they had two children, an elder daughter, Kate, and a younger son, Andrew. After leaving rugby, Lowe began working in hospitality, eventually becoming a landlord, running several pubs around the Hull and East Riding area. He was a qualified electrician, and was also involved in property investment.

Before his death, Lowe relinquished control of The Shakespeare public house (in Baxtergate, Hedon), to his daughter. Phil Lowe died on 20 March 2024, at the age of 74. His funeral took place at Hull Kingston Rovers current ground, Craven Park, on 15 April 2024. The street leading to the ground, originally named Poorhouse Lane, was renamed to Phil Lowe Way in December 2025.

== Honours ==
Hull Kingston Rovers

- Yorkshire Cup: 1967–68
- BBC2 Floodlit Trophy: 1977–78
- RFL Championship: 1978–79
- Challenge Cup: 1979–80
- Rugby League Premiership: 1980–81

Manly

- NSWRL Premiership: 1976

Great Britain

- Rugby League Ashes: 1970
- Rugby League World Cup: 1972
