= Dennis Ward (rugby league) =

Australia international rugby league footballer (1944–2021)

Personal information
- Full name: Dennis Ward
- Born: 27 January 1944 Sydney, New South Wales, Australia
- Died: 11 December 2021 (aged 77) Gold Coast, Queensland, Australia

Playing information
- Position: Halfback
Club
Years	Team	Pld	T	G	FG	P
1964–67	Canterbury-Bankstown	26	6	0	0	18
1968–72	Manly Sea Eagles	80	22	0	30	214
1973–75	Western Suburbs (Newcastle)
1977–1978	Wynnum-Manly
	Total	106	28	0	30	232
Representative
Years	Team	Pld	T	G	FG	P
1969	City Firsts	1	0	0	1	2
1969–73	New South Wales	5	1	0	1	5
1969–72	Australia	6	1	0	0	3

Coaching information
Club
Years	Team	Gms	W	D	L	W%
1977–1978	Wynnum-Manly	42	17	0	25	40

Dennis Ward (27 January 1944 – 11 December 2021) was an Australian professional rugby league footballer. He was a halfback who played first grade in the NSWRFL Premiership for Canterbury-Bankstown and Manly-Warringah from 1965 to 1972, winning the 1972 Grand Final with Manly. He also played for City Firsts, New South Wales and Australia in representative football.

== Early life ==
Dennis Ward was born in Sydney, New South Wales, Australia.

== Club career ==
Ward played for Canterbury-Bankstown for three seasons between 1964–1965 and 1967, Manly-Warringah Sea Eagles for five seasons between 1968 and 1972, New South Wales in 1969 and 1973 and for the Australian national team in six test matches and four world cup matches between 1969 and 1972. He was named man-of-the-match in Manly-Warringah's 1972 grand final victory. Ward later became the Queensland Rugby League coaching director and the National Coaching Director for the New Zealand Rugby League.

After retiring from the NSWRFL at the end of the 1972 season, Ward played 63 first grade games from 1973 to 1975 for Newcastle Rugby League side Western Suburbs Rosellas, and was the club's captain-coach from 1973 to 1974. In 1973 he was the first player selected directly from Wests for a Kangaroo Tour. He is listed on the Australian Players Register as Kangaroo No. 435. Dennis Ward was subsequently named at halfback in Wests Rosellas' team of the century.

== Representative career ==
Ward first played representative football when he was chosen for the City Firsts side in 1969. It would be the only time he played in the City vs Country game.

He was also chosen for NSW in the 1969 and 1972 Interstate series against Queensland.

Ward gained selection for Australia the 1969 tour of New Zealand and played in two tests against the Kiwis. He next played for the Kangaroos in the 1972 Rugby League World Cup in France, including playing in the World Cup final against Great Britain in Lyon. During the WCF, Ward was involved in "the greatest try never scored", later shown on TV to be legitimately scored by Australian fullback Graeme Langlands who chased and dived to catch Ward's bomb in mid-air, but it was disallowed by French referee Georges Jameau who believed the Australian captain to be offside.

Ward was then chosen from Newcastle to the 1973 Kangaroo tour of Great Britain and France, and although playing a number of games on the tour he did not play in a test match against either Great Britain or France.

== Coaching ==
In 1977, Ward captain-coached the Wynnum-Manly club in the Brisbane Rugby League premiership, remaining on as coach for the 1978 season. Despite ostensibly retiring from playing after the 1977 season, Ward returned to the field in Round 10 of the 1978 BRL Season, scoring a try to lead Wynnum-Manly to a 24–13 upset win over the Easts Tigers. Ward also played as halfback in Wynnum-Manly's 35–4 loss to the Redcliffe Dolphins the following week. In the 1990s he became the Coaching and development director for the Queensland Rugby League.
