= Mocky Brereton =

NZ international rugby league footballer & coach

Personal information
- Full name: Maurice Patrick Brereton
- Born: 13 April 1947 (age 79) Greymouth, New Zealand

Playing information
- Position: Wing, Centre
Club
Years	Team	Pld	T	G	FG	P
19??–69	Greymouth Marist
1970–80	Marist-West Suburbs		156
	Total	0	156	0	0	0
Representative
Years	Team	Pld	T	G	FG	P
1966–69	West Coast
1969–75	New Zealand	24	3	0	0	9
1970–79	Canterbury	53	46
	South Island
	Southern Zone

Coaching information
Club
Years	Team	Gms	W	D	L	W%
1977	Marist-West Suburbs

Maurice "Mocky" Patrick Brereton is a New Zealand former professional rugby league footballer who represented New Zealand in the 1970 and 1972 World Cups and one match in the 1975 World Championship Series.

== Playing career ==
Brereton was originally from the West Coast. He was educated at Marist Brothers High School, Greymouth. and made his New Zealand national rugby league team debut in 1969 while playing for the Greymouth Marist club.

Brereton then moved to Christchurch, joining the Marist-Western Suburbs club in the Canterbury Rugby League competition in 1970. He was part of the 1970 and 1972 World Cup Squads. In 1975 he played one match in the World Championship Series but was not selected for the squad for the October finals. Instead he played for Canterbury in the side that defeated Auckland in the New Zealand Rugby League final. Brereton played in 24 tests and scored 25 tries in 50 matches for the Kiwis. Brereton also represented the South Island, Southern Zone, New Zealand Marist and Rest of New Zealand.

Brereton's 46 tries for Canterbury is a district record, as is his 156 tries for Marist-Western Suburbs.

== Later years ==
Brereton coached Marist-Western Suburbs in 1977 and was elected the club president of the Marist-Western Suburbs club in 1985.

== Personal life ==
Brereton was a Police detective from his playing days until his retirement in 1995, after 25 years in the force. In 1971 he was the New Zealand Police's "Sportsman of the Year". In 2006 it was announced he was suffering from Parkinson's disease. He works as the publican at the Ashley Hotel.
