= Dennis O'Neill (rugby league) =

GB international rugby league footballer

Personal information
- Born: c 1948 (age 77–78)

Playing information
- Position: Stand-off
Club
Years	Team	Pld	T	G	FG	P
1966–78	Widnes	277	112	3	0	342
1978–80	Whitehaven
1980–81	Oldham	31	7	0	0	21
	Total	308	119	3	0	363
Representative
Years	Team	Pld	T	G	FG	P
1968–72	Lancashire	8	3	0	0	9
1971–72	Great Britain	3	1	0	0	3

Dennis O'Neill is a World Cup winning former professional rugby league footballer who played in the 1960s and 1970s. He played at representative level for Great Britain and Lancashire, and at club level for Widnes and Oldham, as a stand-off.

== Playing career ==
=== Club career ===
Dennis O'Neill played stand-off, and scored a try in Widnes 8–15 defeat by Wigan in the 1971–72 Lancashire Cup Final during the 1970–71 season at Knowsley Road, St. Helens on Saturday 28 August 1971, and played right-centre in the 6-2 victory over Salford in the 1974–75 Lancashire Cup Final during the 1974–75 season at Central Park, Wigan on Saturday 2 November 1974.

Dennis O'Neill played right wing in Widnes' 7–15 defeat by Bramley in the 1973 BBC2 Floodlit Trophy Final during the 1973–74 season at Naughton Park, Widnes on Tuesday 18 December 1973.

Dennis O'Neill played right-centre in Widnes' 2–3 defeat by Bradford Northern in the 1974–75 Player's No.6 Trophy Final during the 1974–75 season at Wilderspool Stadium, Warrington on Saturday 25 January 1975.

Dennis O'Neill appeared as a substitute (replacing right wing Alan Prescott) in Widnes' 5–20 defeat by St, Helens in the 1975–76 Challenge Cup, London Final during the 1975–76 season at Wembley Stadium, London on Saturday 8 May 1976, in front of a crowd of 89,982, and played left wing in the 7-16 defeat by Leeds in the 1976–77 Challenge Cup Final during the 1976–77 season at Wembley Stadium, London on Saturday 7 May 1977, in front of a crowd of 80,871.

In October 1978, he was signed by Whitehaven.

=== International honours ===
Dennis O'Neill won caps for Great Britain while at Widnes in 1971 against New Zealand, and in the 1972 Rugby League World Cup against Australia (1-try), and France.

== Personal life ==
Dennis O'Neill is the brother of the rugby league footballer James "Jim"/"Jimmy" O'Neill.
