= John Grant (rugby league) =

Australia international rugby league footballer

Personal information
- Born: 19 March 1950 (age 76) Brisbane, Australia

Playing information
- Position: Wing
Club
Years	Team	Pld	T	G	FG	P
1971–78	Souths (Brisbane)
1972–73	Warrington	10	4	0	0	12
	Total	10	4	0	0	12
Representative
Years	Team	Pld	T	G	FG	P
1972–73	Queensland	7	0	0	0	0
1972	Australia	3	0	0	0	0

John Grant (born 19 March 1950) is an Australian businessman, rugby league football administrator and former chairman of the Australian Rugby League Commission which controls rugby league in Australia. A former player of the 1970s, he was a Queensland interstate representative three-quarter back and a member of the Australian team which lost the 1972 World Cup to Great Britain in France. Grant had been playing his club football for the Brisbane Rugby League's Souths club under coach Wayne Bennett. Following the World Cup, Grant joined English club Warrington, playing for them during their table-topping 1972–73 season.

Grant had completed an engineering degree at the University of Queensland before taking up a scholarship with Brisbane City Council. He went on to head the information technology company Data3 and become chairman of the Australian Information Industry Association. In 2011 Grant was named as the inaugural chairman of the Australian Rugby League Commission. The 2012 NRL season was the commission's first in control of the League.

In February 2018, Peter Beattie replaced Grant as chairman of the commission.
