= Bill Burgoyne =

New Zealand international rugby league footballer

Personal information
- Full name: William John Edward Burgoyne
- Born: 20 December 1946 New Zealand
- Died: 16 November 1999 (aged 52)

Playing information
- Position: Hooker
Club
Years	Team	Pld	T	G	FG	P
	Marist Saints
	Bay Roskill Vikings
	Total	0	0	0	0	0
Representative
Years	Team	Pld	T	G	FG	P
1968–69	Auckland
1972–74	New Zealand	4	1	0	0	3
- Relatives: Leilani Tamu (daughter)

William John Edward Burgoyne (20 December 1946 – 16 November 1999) was a New Zealand rugby league player who represented New Zealand in the 1972 World Cup.

== Playing career ==
Burgoyne played for both the Marist Saints and the Bay Roskill Vikings in the Auckland Rugby League competition. In 1968 he was selected for Auckland. He again played for Auckland in 1969, including in Auckland's 14-15 loss to Australia. He played for the New Zealand Māori side in 1972.

He was first selected for the New Zealand national rugby league team in 1972, as part of the squad for that year's World Cup. He played in three games at the tournament, scoring a try against Great Britain. He played one more test for New Zealand, again against Great Britain, in 1974.

== Personal life ==
Burgoyne's daughter Leilani Tamu is a writer, a former diplomat and a former candidate for the New Zealand Green Party. She has spoken frankly about her father's severe gambling addiction, indirectly leading to his early death at the age of 52.
