= Victor Serrano (rugby league) =

France international rugby league player (1944–2022)

Personal information
- Born: January 11, 1944; Bellreguart, Spain
- Died: 27 April 2022 (aged 78); Toulouse, France

Playing information
- Height: 5 ft 9 in (1.75 m)
- Weight: 13 st 7 lb (86 kg)
- Position: Prop, Second-row, Loose forward
Club
Years	Team	Pld	T	G	FG	P
1964-74	Saint-Gaudens
Representative
Years	Team	Pld	T	G	FG	P
1968–75	France	14	0	5		10

Victor Serrano (1944 – 27 April 2022) was a French rugby league player. He played as prop, second-row and lock. He is often nicknamed "Nestor".

== Biography ==
During his childhood, he played for the football Miramont-de-Comminges club since age ten, before joining the Saint-Gaudens rugby league club, next to his residence site.

Serrano played for Saint-Gaudens at club level. He also represented France between 1968 and 1975, playing the 1968, 1972 and 1975 Rugby League World Cups. Outside the game, he worked as an electrician.

== Honours ==
- Rugby league:
  - French Championship:
  - 2 times Champion in: 1969, 1973, (Saint-Gaudens)
  - 5 times finalist in 1965, 1966, 1968, 1970, 1971 (Saint-Gaudens)
