= Australian Information Industry Association =

The Australian Information Industry Association (AIIA) is the peak body representing the information and communications technology (ICT) industry in Australia.

The AIIA’s membership includes computer hardware and software services to multinational companies and local small-to-medium-sized enterprises. The association provides member companies with business productivity tools, advisory services and market intelligence.

The AIIA was formed in 1978 as the Australian Computer Equipment Suppliers’ Association, revising its name to the Australian Information Industry Association in January 1985 to reflect the broadening scope of the ICT sector.

For nearly 30 years, the AIIA has been hosting the state and national iAwards program.

== Activities ==
The AIIA focuses on shaping policy at a federal and state government level.

== Leadership ==
The current CEO, Ron Gauci, was appointed in 2018 and the current Chairman, Robert Hillard, was appointed in 2019.
