= André Ruiz =

Former France dual-code international rugby footballer

Personal information
- Born: 30 March 1947 (age 78); Séméac, Hautes-Pyrénées, Occitania, France
- Height: 1.73 m (5 ft 8 in)
- Weight: 12 st; 77 kg (170 lb)

Playing information

Rugby union
- Position: Centre
Club
Years	Team	Pld	T	G	FG	P
1968–1968	Stadoceste Tarbais	2	0	0	0	0
Representative
Years	Team	Pld	T	G	FG	P
1968–1968	France	2	0	0	0	0

Rugby league
- Position: Centre
Club
Years	Team	Pld	T	G	FG	P
1970–77	AS Carcassonne
Representative
Years	Team	Pld	T	G	FG	P
1970–77	France	19	4	0	0	12

André Ruiz (born 30 March 1947) is a French rugby footballer who represented his country in both rugby league and rugby union, including in the four Rugby League World Cups.

== Playing career ==
Ruiz originally played rugby union and in 1968 played in two test matches for the France national rugby union team.

He then switched to rugby league and represented the France national rugby league team, making his debut at the 1970 Rugby League World Cup. He went on to play in 19 internationals for France, including in the 1972, 1975 and 1977 Rugby League World Cups.
