= Gary Sullivan (rugby league) =

Australian rugby league footballer

Personal information
- Born: 18 October 1947 (age 78) Kurri Kurri, New South Wales, Australia

Playing information
- Position: Forward
Club
Years	Team	Pld	T	G	FG	P
1966–69	Kurri Kurri
1970–75	Newtown	107	13	0	0	39
	Total	107	13	0	0	39
Representative
Years	Team	Pld	T	G	FG	P
1970–72	Australia	7	2	0	0	6
1972–73	New South Wales	3	1	0	0	3
1973	City NSW	1	0	0	0	0

Gary Sullivan is an Australian former professional rugby league footballer who played in the 1960s and 1970s, and busted caps in the 1990s. An Australian international and New South Wales interstate representative forward, he played club football in the New South Wales Rugby Football League Premiership for Newtown.

== Rugby League career ==
After playing for Kurri Kurri, Sullivan moved to Sydney to play in the New South Wales Rugby Football League premiership for Newtown in 1970. After only six first-grade games he was selected for Australia's victorious 1970 World Cup squad at lock. Following Ron Coote's decision to stand down from representative football in 1972, Sullivan made his New South Wales début before being selected in two Tests against New Zealand. He scored two tries in Australia's 36–11 win at the SCG before playing in the Second Test in Brisbane. At the end of the year Sullivan was selected for Australia's 1972 World Cup campaign. He was selected to play at lock forward in the tournament final against Great Britain which was drawn at 10-10.

Sullivan later played in the Newcastle Rugby League in the late 1970s and early 1980s.

In 2010 he was named at lock forward in Kurri Kurri Rugby League Club's team of the century.

== Criminal activities ==
Between 1985 and 1991, Sullivan with the help of his stepfather, Bill Orchard, stole more than $3 million in 14 separate armed robberies of banks and armoured cars. These crimes took place in a variety of locations in South East Queensland such as Logan City, Brisbane, and the Gold Coast.

In 1991, when Sullivan and his stepfather were finally apprehended, they had pulled off 6 out of the top 10 heists in total amount stolen in Queensland history. Once Sullivan and Orchard were apprehended, they both made individual confessions to at least some of the offenses.

On 13 December 1991, Sullivan and Orchard were convicted of 12 offenses of Armed Robbery and 2 offenses of Armed Robbery in Accompany of Violence. Each were sentenced to 20 years in prison with eligibility of parole beginning after 7 years.

On 28 May 2026 Sullivan was arrested in Southport, Queensland and charged with shooting three men during an armed robbery of an Armaguaurd van at Chadstone Shopping Centre on 16 May 1994.
