= Murray Eade =

New Zealand international rugby league footballer and coach

Personal information
- Full name: Murray Keith Eade
- Born: Auckland Region, New Zealand

Playing information
- Position: Loose forward
Club
Years	Team	Pld	T	G	FG	P
	Ellerslie
1978–81	Eastern United
	Total	0	0	0	0	0
Representative
Years	Team	Pld	T	G	FG	P
	Auckland
1971–78	New Zealand	16	3	0	0	9

Coaching information
Club
Years	Team	Gms	W	D	L	W%
1978–81	Eastern United

Murray Eade is a New Zealand former rugby league footballer who represented New Zealand in the 1972 and 1975 World Cups.

== Playing career ==
Eade played for Ellerslie in the Auckland Rugby League competition and also represented Auckland. In 1971 Eade was part of the Auckland team that defeated Australia 15-14 at Carlaw Park.

Eade was first selected for the New Zealand national rugby league team in 1971 and was then selected to be part of the 1972 World Cup squad. In 1972 Eade won the Rothville Trophy as player of the year in the Auckland competition.

He was made vice captain of Auckland in 1973 and in 1974 was part of their side that defeated Wales 31-5 in 1975. Eade was selected as part of the 1975 World Cup squad and continued to play for the Kiwis until 1978. In total he played in sixteen test matches for New Zealand.

== Coaching career ==
In 1978 Eade was appointed the player-coach of Eastern United, a combined senior team from the Howick and Pakuranga clubs. The team finished the 1979 season undefeated with only three draws. Eade continued as player coach until he was replaced after a poor 1981 season.
