= 1972 Rugby League World Cup =

Sixth Rugby League World Cup

1972 World Cup
- Number of teams: 4
- Host country: France
- Winner: Great Britain (3rd title)
- Matches played: 7
- Attendance: 62,456 (8,922 per match)
- Points scored: 240 (34.29 per match)
- Top scorer: (United Kingdom) John Holmes (26)
- Top try scorer: (Australia) Bob Fulton (5)

The sixth Rugby League World Cup was held in France in October and November 1972. Australia were the holders, while New Zealand had beaten all three of the other nations in 1971 and France were on their home soil. Great Britain won the title and levelled the score of World titles with the Australians at 3-3.

The final was held at Stade Gerland in Lyon. Great Britain played Australia and, with scores level and unchanged after extra time, claimed the cup on league placing.

This was the last World Cup to be played under the four-tackle rule.

== Venues ==
Marseille	Paris	Toulouse
Stade Vélodrome	Parc des Princes	Stadium Municipal
Capacity: 55,000	Capacity: 48,712	Capacity: 37,000
Perpignan	Pau	Grenoble
Stade Gilbert Brutus	Stade du Hameau	Stade Lesdiguières
Capacity: 13,000	Capacity: 12,000	Capacity: 12,000
	Stade du Hameau - Pau	

=== Final Venue ===
Lyon
Stade de Gerland
Capacity: 45,000

== Results ==
=== Group stage ===
Team	Pld	W	D	L	PF	PA	PD	Pts	Qualification
Great Britain	3	3	0	0	93	44	+49	6	Advances to the Final
Australia	3	2	0	1	61	41	+20	4	Advances to the Final
France	3	1	0	2	33	53	−20	2	
New Zealand	3	0	0	3	33	82	−49	0	

28 October 1972	France	20 – 9	New Zealand	Stade Vélodrome, Marseille

29 October 1972	Great Britain	27 – 21	Australia	Stade Gilbert Brutus, Perpingnan

1 November 1972	France	4 – 13	Great Britain	Stade Lesdiguières, Grenoble

1 November 1972	Australia	9 – 5	New Zealand	Parc des Princes, Paris

4 November 1972	Great Britain	53 – 19	New Zealand	Stade du Hameau, Pau

5 November 1972	France	9 – 31	Australia	Stadium Municipal, Toulouse

=== Final ===
11 November 1972

Great Britain	10–10 (AET)	Australia
Tries: Clive Sullivan; Mike Stephenson; Goals: Terry Clawson (2)		Tries: John O'Neill; Arthur Beetson; Goals: Ray Branighan (2)

Stade de Gerland, Lyon
Attendance: 4,231
Referee: Georges Jameau (France)

Great Britain	Australia

FB	1	Paul Charlton
RW	2	Clive Sullivan (c)
RC	3	Chris Hesketh
LC	4	John Walsh
LW	5	John Atkinson
SO	6	John Holmes
SH	7	Steve Nash
PR	8	Terry Clawson
HK	9	Mike Stephenson
PR	10	David Jeanes
SR	11	Phil Lowe
SR	12	Brian Lockwood
LF	13	George Nicholls
Substitutions:
IC	14	Bob Irving
IC	15
Coach:
(England) Jim Challinor

FB	1	Graeme Langlands (c)
RW	2	John Grant
RC	3	Mark Harris
LC	4	Geoff Starling
LW	5	Ray Branighan
FE	6	Bob Fulton
HB	7	Dennis Ward
PR	8	John O'Neill
HK	9	Elwyn Walters
PR	10	Bob O'Reilly
SR	11	Arthur Beetson
SR	12	Gary Stevens
LK	13	Gary Sullivan
Substitutions:
IC	14	Fred Jones
IC	15
Coach:
(Australia) Harry Bath

The French public seemed uninterested in a final that did not involve the home team, as just over 4,200 spectators turned up. The game will always be remembered by the British for their captain Clive Sullivan's wonderful long distance try and by the Australians for perhaps "the greatest try never scored", later shown on TV to be legitimately scored by Australian fullback Graeme Langlands but disallowed by French referee Georges Jameau. Mike Stephenson scored the 73rd-minute try that helped Great Britain level the scores and secure the World Cup. Had Aussie winger Ray Branighan succeeded with a 79th-minute penalty or Bob Fulton landed one of three drop goal attempts in the last five minutes, the cup could easily have gone to Australia. But for the first time in the competition's history the scores were level at full-time. An additional twenty minutes extra time was played, but no further score resulted, and Great Britain were awarded the cup by virtue of a better position in the table.

== Try scorers ==
5

- (Australia) Bob Fulton

4

- (United Kingdom) Clive Sullivan

3

- (United Kingdom) John Atkinson
- (United Kingdom) Phil Lowe
- (United Kingdom) Mike Stephenson

2

- (Australia) Mark Harris
- (Australia) John O'Neill
- (Australia) Paul Sait
- (France) Jean-Marie Bonal
- (France) Andre Ruiz
- (United Kingdom) John Holmes
- (New Zealand) Phillip Orchard
- (New Zealand) John Whittaker

1

- (Australia) Arthur Beetson
- (Australia) Tommy Raudonikis
- (Australia) Elwyn Walters
- (Australia) Dennis Ward
- (United Kingdom) Paul Charlton
- (United Kingdom) Chris Hesketh
- (United Kingdom) David Jeanes
- (United Kingdom) Steve Nash
- (United Kingdom) George Nicholls
- (United Kingdom) Dennis O'Neill
- (New Zealand) Mocky Brereton
- (New Zealand) Bill Burgoyne
- (New Zealand) Tony Coll
- (New Zealand) Murray Eade
- (New Zealand) Dennis Williams

== Tour games ==
After the World Championship, Australia and New Zealand arranged short three-game tours against English clubs.

Australia

Date	Opponents	Score	Venue	Attendance
15 November	St Helens	Won 24–9	St Helens	9,311
17 November	Wigan	Drew 18–18	Wigan	6,300
19 November	Bradford Northern	Won 29–16	Bradford	2,820

New Zealand

Date	Opponents	Score	Venue	Attendance
15 November	Leeds	Lost 6–11	Leeds	
17 November	Huddersfield	Won 32–2	Huddersfield	
19 November	Salford	Lost 4–50	Salford	
