= Bob Irving (rugby league) =

Great Britain and England international rugby league footballer

Personal information
- Full name: Robert A. Irving
- Born: 15 February 1948 (Note: Bob Irving's obituary in The Independent misstates his month of birth as December; it was February.) Huddersfield, England
- Died: 18 April 1999 (aged 51) Blackpool, England

Playing information
- Position: Second-row
Club
Years	Team	Pld	T	G	FG	P
1965–73	Oldham	296	80	0	0	240
1973–77	Wigan	152+2	40	0	0	120
1977–78	Salford	39	7	0	0	21
1978–80	Barrow	48+3	14	0	0	42
1981–82	Blackpool Borough	16	4	0	0	12
1982–83	Swinton	25	10	0	0	30
	Total	581	155	0	0	465
Representative
Years	Team	Pld	T	G	FG	P
1971–75	Yorkshire	11	3	0	0	9
1975	England	3	0	0	0	0
1967–72	Great Britain	11	0	0	0	0

Robert A. Irving (15 February 1948 – 18 April 1999) was an English World Cup winning professional rugby league footballer who played in the 1960s and 1970s. A Great Britain and England international, and Yorkshire representative second-row, he played at club level for Oldham, Wigan, Salford, Barrow, Blackpool Borough and Swinton.

== Background ==
Bob Irving was born in Castle Hill, Huddersfield, West Riding of Yorkshire, England, he was a hotelier in Blackpool, and studied for a degree, becoming a senior lecturer in business studies at Blackpool and The Fylde College. He was active in the Catholic Church, and undertook charity work in his spare time, regularly manning a soup kitchen for homeless and displaced people, and he died aged 51, following a heart attack in Blackpool, Lancashire, England.

== Playing career ==
=== Club career ===
Irving played rugby league for St Joseph's (in Huddersfield) until the age of 16 when he turned professional with Oldham in January 1965. Within a few weeks, he was playing in the first team.

Bob Irving played at second-row in Oldham's 13–16 defeat by Wigan in the 1966–67 Lancashire Cup Final during the 1966–67 season at Station Road, Swinton on Saturday 29 October 1966, and played at second-row in the 2–30 defeat by St. Helens in the 1968–69 Lancashire Cup Final during the 1968–69 season at Central Park, Wigan on Friday 25 October 1968, played at second-row in Wigan's 19–9 victory over Salford in the 1973–74 Lancashire Cup Final during the 1973–74 season at Wilderspool Stadium, Warrington on Saturday 13 October 1973, and played at prop in the 13–16 defeat by Workington Town in the 1977–78 Lancashire Cup Final during the 1977–78 season at Wilderspool Stadium, Warrington on Saturday 29 October 1977.

Irving joined Blackpool Borough for the 1981–82 season as a player-coach. He joined Swinton in March 1982 after being relieved of his coaching duties.

=== International honours ===
Irving won caps for England while at Wigan in the 1975 Rugby League World Cup against Wales, France, and Australia, and won caps for Great Britain while at Oldham in 1967 against France (2 matches), and Australia (3 matches), in 1970 against Australia (sub), and New Zealand, in 1971 against New Zealand, in 1972 against France (sub), and in the 1972 Rugby League World Cup against New Zealand, and Australia (sub).

== Honoured at Oldham ==
Robert Irving is an Oldham Hall of Fame Inductee.
