= Geoff Starling =

Australia international rugby league footballer

Personal information
- Born: 14 December 1952 (age 73)

Playing information
- Position: Centre, Wing, Lock
Club
Years	Team	Pld	T	G	FG	P
1971–74	Balmain	65	22	5	0	76
Representative
Years	Team	Pld	T	G	FG	P
1971–73	Australia	11	5	0	0	14
1971–72	New South Wales	3	1	0	0	3
1972	City NSW	1	0	0	0	0

Geoff Starling (14 December 1952) is an Australian former professional rugby league footballer who played in the 1970s. An Australia international and New South Wales interstate representative three-quarter back, he played club football in the NSWRFL Premiership for Sydney's Balmain Tigers club.

In 1970 Starling was playing in the Jersey Flegg competition for the Balmain club. The following season he started playing first grade, gaining selection for the Australian national team, becoming Kangaroo No. 459, and the youngest player to ever represent Australia. He was 18 years and 181 days old when playing a 1971 Kangaroo Tour match against a New Zealand XIII at Huntly. That season he also played for the New South Wales side. The following year he made his Test match début against New Zealand. Starling was also selected to represent Australia in the 1972 World Cup, playing in the final which was drawn with Great Britain. In 1973 Starling was selected to go on the end of season Kangaroo tour, helping Australia to victory in the Ashes series.

In 1974 Starling contracted a debilitating disease that absorbed his energy, yet defied diagnosis. Over four weeks he lost 19 kg (42 lb), forcing him into an early retirement. He spent time in hospital in 1975 and attempted a comeback in 1976. Years later his ailment was diagnosed as Addison's disease.

In 2007 Starling was inducted into the Balmain Tigers Hall of Fame.
