= Paul Sait =

Australian rugby league footballer (1947–2023)

Personal information
- Full name: Paul Joseph Sait
- Born: 4 September 1947
- Died: 23 November 2023 (aged 76)

Playing information
- Position: Centre, Lock, Second-row
Club
Years	Team	Pld	T	G	FG	P
1968–78	South Sydney	160	31	0	0	93
Representative
Years	Team	Pld	T	G	FG	P
1969–74	New South Wales	5	2	0	0	6
1970–75	Australia	16	2	0	0	6
1971–75	NSW City	3	0	0	0	0

Paul Joseph Sait (4 September 1947 – 23 November 2023) was an Australian rugby league footballer and coach. A versatile centre or running forward who played in the 1960s and 1970s for South Sydney. He made seven Test appearances for the Australian national representative side and represented in nine World Cup matches in two World Cups and in ten Kangaroo tour matches.

== Club career ==
Sait featured in the talented South Sydney sides of the early seventies. He played in the 1969 Grand Final loss to Balmain and then in the Premiership victories of 1970 and 1971.

Sait played 221 club games for South Sydney between 1969 and 1979 with 163 of those games in 1st Grade. He scored 44 tries for the club.

In 2004 he was named by Souths in their South Sydney Dream Team, consisting of 17 players and a coach representing the club from 1908 through to 2004.

== Representative career ==
Sait debuted for Australia in the centres in the 1970 World Cup in Britain though the remainder of his representative career was played at second-row forward. His first Test appearance was on the 1971 tour of New Zealand. He played in the 1972 World Cup in France and toured Great Britain with the Kangaroos in 1973 playing in four Tests and nine tour matches. He played lock on the 1973 tour of England and France including all the tests. Sait is listed on the Australian Players Register as Kangaroo No. 451.

== Coaching ==
Sait went on to coach at Souths in the 1980s.

== Death ==
Sait died on 23 November 2023, at the age of 76.

== Sources ==
- Andrews, Malcolm (2006) The ABC of Rugby League, Austn Broadcasting Corpn, Sydney
