= Mark Harris (rugby league) =

Australian rugby league footballer (1947–2020)

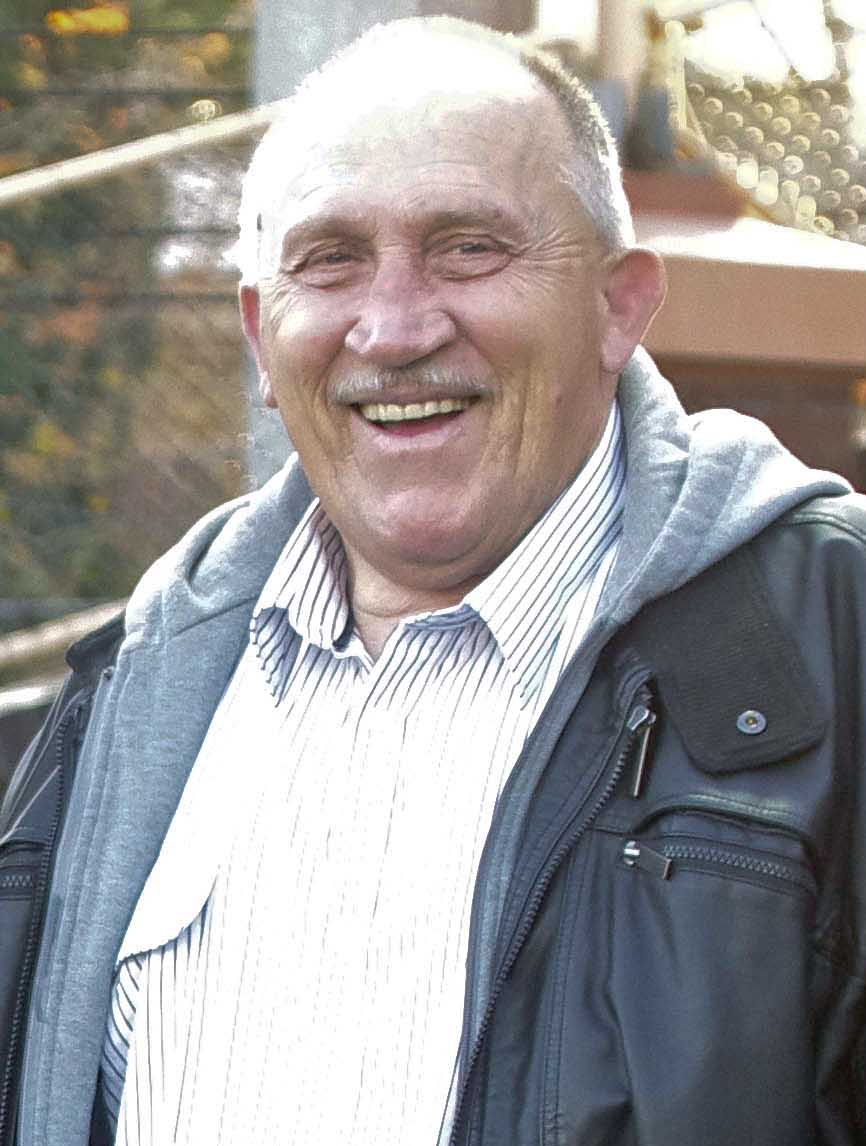
- Harris in 2015

Personal information
- Born: 22 August 1947 Brisbane, Queensland, Australia
- Died: 15 January 2020 (aged 72)

Playing information
- Position: Centre
Club
Years	Team	Pld	T	G	FG	P
1970–79	Eastern Suburbs	190	88	17	0	298
1980–81	North Sydney	33	5	3	0	21
	Total	223	93	20	0	319
Representative
Years	Team	Pld	T	G	FG	P
1970–78	New South Wales	11	9	0	0	27
1970–77	Australia	11	6	0	0	18
1972–77	City NSW	4	6	0	0	18
- Football career

Profile
- Position: Kickoff specialist

Career history
- 1973: Montreal Alouettes

Mark Walter Harris (22 August 1947 – 15 January 2020) was an Australian professional rugby league footballer who played for the Eastern Suburbs (1970–79) and North Sydney (1980–81) clubs. He also represented the Montreal Alouettes in the Canadian Football League. A destructive hard running centre, Harris made 190 appearances for the Roosters and a further 33 for the Bears.

== Playing career ==
A Brisbane junior, Harris was playing in Papua New Guinea for the Kone Tigers club when recruited into the NSWRFL Premiership by Sydney's Eastern Suburbs club. In a Fox Sports interview in 2019 just before his death, Harris said he was playing Rugby Union on the Sunshine Coast when recruited by Easts. Harris who was an instant success won the prestigious media award 'Rookie Of The Year' in his first season. He was selected to represent Australia in the 1970 Rugby League World Cup. In 1972 he won another prestigious award taking out the Sun-Herald player of the year award. He was also selected to represent Australia in the 1972 Rugby League World Cup. Harris played in just the one test match for Australia, that was against New Zealand in 1972.

=== Gridiron football career ===
Harris turned down a place on the 1973 Kangaroo tour of Great Britain and France to trial with an American football team, the Philadelphia Eagles. He failed to make the roster after he tried out as a kicker. After failing to get a contract, Harris played Canadian football for the Montreal Alouettes in the Canadian Football League. Harris played 7 matches as a long range kickoff specialist during the 1973 CFL season.

=== Return to rugby league ===
Harris returned to the Roosters and was a member of some of Eastern Suburbs greatest teams, winning premierships with that club in 1974 and 1975. He was selected to represent Australia in the 1975 Rugby League World Cup. Harris was also a member of the 1974 and '77 pre-Season cup winning sides, the 1975 and '77 midweek cups. During the 1976 NSWRFL season, Harris played as a centre for Eastern Suburbs in their 1976 World Club Challenge match against British champions St. Helens in Sydney. He was selected to represent Australia in the 1977 Rugby League World Cup.

Harris played out the final years of his career with the North Sydney club.

== Post-playing career ==
Harris was a member of the National Rugby League judiciary in 2000. He died on 15 January 2020 from throat cancer at the age of 72.
