= David Jeanes =

Great Britain international rugby league footballer

Personal information
- Full name: Horace David Jeanes
- Born: 27 December 1943 (age 81) Skipton, England

Playing information
- Weight: 16 st 5 lb (104 kg)

Rugby union
Club
Years	Team	Pld	T	G	FG	P
	Keighley RUFC
	Wakefield RFC
	Total	0	0	0	0	0

Rugby league
- Position: Prop
Club
Years	Team	Pld	T	G	FG	P
1968–72	Wakefield Trinity	168
1972–75	Leeds	83
1977–≥79	Huddersfield	36
	Total	287	0	0	0	0
Representative
Years	Team	Pld	T	G	FG	P
≥1968–≤75	Yorkshire	≥4
1971–72	Great Britain	8	3

Horace David Jeanes (27 December 1943) is an English former rugby union and World Cup winning professional rugby league footballer who played in the 1960s and 1970s. He played club level rugby union (RU) for Keighley RUFC and Wakefield RFC, and representative level rugby union for Yorkshire and rugby league (RL) for Great Britain and Yorkshire, and at club level for Wakefield Trinity (captain), Leeds and Huddersfield, as a prop.

== Background ==
David Jeanes was born in Skipton, West Riding of Yorkshire, England. He grew up on Greatwood Avenue, and attended the town's Parish Church Primary School. Due to a shortage of places at the nearest grammar school, Ermysted’s, Jeanes instead joined Keighley Boys' Grammar School, where he learned to play rugby union.

== Rugby union career ==
After leaving school, Jeanes began playing rugby union for Keighley RUFC. After moving to Wakefield with his family, he joined Wakefield RFC. He attracted the attention of the town's rugby league team, Wakefield Trinity, and was offered a contract to play for the club.

== Rugby league career ==
=== Wakefield Trinity ===
Prior to his professional career, Jeanes played one game of rugby league in 1961 with amateur club Silsden in an under-19's cup final against Keighley Albion.

Jeanes played left-prop, and scored a try in Wakefield Trinity's 17-10 victory over Hull Kingston Rovers in the Championship Final during the 1967–68 season at Headingley, Leeds on Saturday 4 May 1968.

Jeanes played left-prop in Wakefield Trinity's 10-11 defeat by Leeds in the 1967–68 Challenge Cup "Watersplash" Final during the 1967–68 season at Wembley Stadium, London on Saturday 11 May 1968, in front of a crowd of 87,100.

Jeanes played left-prop and was captain in Wakefield Trinity's 11-22 defeat by Halifax in the 1971–72 Player's No.6 Trophy Final during the 1971–72 season at Odsal Stadium, Bradford on Saturday 22 January 1972.

=== Leeds ===
In September 1972, Jeanes was signed by Leeds for a fee of £8,000.

He played right-prop in Leeds' 12-7 victory over Salford in the 1972–73 Player's No.6 Trophy Final during the 1972–73 season at Fartown Ground, Huddersfield on Saturday 24 March 1973.

Jeanes played left-prop in Leeds 7-2 victory over Wakefield Trinity in the 1973–74 Yorkshire Cup Final during the 1973–74 season at Headingley, Leeds on Saturday 20 October 1973.

=== Representative honours ===
Jeanes won cap(s) for Yorkshire while at Wakefield Trinity.

Jeanes played right-prop in Great Britain's 10–10 draw with Australia in the 1972 Rugby League World Cup Final at Stade de Gerland, Lyon on 11 November 1972. Great Britain were awarded the Rugby League World Cup by virtue of a better position in the final qualification league table.

== Honours ==
Wakefield Trinity

- Championship: 1968

Leeds

- Player's No.6 Trophy: 1972–73
- Yorkshire Cup: 1973

Great Britain

- Rugby League World Cup: 1972
