= Terry Clawson =

English rugby league footballer

Personal information
- Full name: Terence A. Clawson
- Born: 9 April 1940 Normanton, West Riding of Yorkshire, England
- Died: 2 September 2013 (aged 73) Pontefract, West Yorkshire, England

Playing information
- Position: Prop, Second-row
Club
Years	Team	Pld	T	G	FG	P
1957–65	Featherstone Rovers	191	39	483	0	1083
1965–68	Bradford Northern	128+2	15	230	0	505
1968–71	Hull Kingston Rovers	110+1	9	204	0	435
1971–73	Leeds	63	5	165	0	345
1973–75	Oldham	22	1	26	0	55
1974–75	York	28	2	4	0	14
1976–77	Bradford Northern	17+4	1	19	0	41
1978	Featherstone Rovers	24	2	0	0	6
1978–79	Wakefield Trinity	9	0	2	0	4
1979	Huddersfield	3	1	0	0	3
1980	Hull F.C.	2	0	0	0	0
	Total	604	75	1133	0	2491
Representative
Years	Team	Pld	T	G	FG	P
1960–71	Yorkshire	8+1	0	3	0	6
1962–74	Great Britain	14	0	25	0	50
1974	GB tour games	9	0	21	0	42

Coaching information
Club
Years	Team	Gms	W	D	L	W%
1978	Featherstone Rovers	13	4	0	9	31
	South Newcastle
	Total	13	4	0	9	31

Terence A. Clawson (9 April 1940 – 2 September 2013) was an English World Cup winning professional rugby league footballer who played from the 1950s through to the 1980s. He played at representative level for Great Britain between 1962 and 1974, and was part of the 1972 Rugby League World Cup winning squad. He also played for Yorkshire, and at club level for Featherstone Rovers (two spells) (captain), Bradford Northern (two spells), Leeds, Hull Kingston Rovers, Oldham, York, Wakefield Trinity, Hull F.C. and South Newcastle (of the Newcastle Rugby League in Newcastle, New South Wales, Australia), as a goal-kicking prop or second-row. He coached at club level for South Newcastle and Featherstone Rovers.

== Background ==
Clawson as born in Normanton, West Riding of Yorkshire, England. He worked as a coal miner both during and after his playing career. In 2000, he released an autobiography entitled All the Wrong Moves. Clawson died aged 73 in Pontefract, West Yorkshire.

== Playing career ==
=== Featherstone Rovers ===
Clawson started his career at Featherstone Rovers, making his début aged 17 against Bramley on Saturday 28 December 1957. He won his first club trophy in 1959, Terry Clawson played loose forward in Featherstone Rovers' 15–14 victory over Hull F.C. in the 1959–60 Yorkshire Cup Final during the 1959–60 season at Headingley, Leeds on Saturday 31 October 1959. In 1963, it was discovered that Clawson had contracted tuberculosis, threatening to bring his rugby league career to an end. He made a full recovery however, although he missed the majority of the 1963–64 season.

Clawson won caps for Yorkshire while at Featherstone Rovers; during the 1960–61 season against Lancashire, and during the 1962–63 season against Cumberland, and Lancashire.

=== Bradford Northern ===
In January 1965, Clawson was transferred to Bradford Northern for a fee believed to be just over £3,000. He appeared in over 130 games for Bradford, scoring more than 500 points.

Terry Clawson played at second-row and scored four goals in Bradford Northern's 17–8 victory over Hunslet in the 1965–66 Yorkshire Cup Final during the 1965–66 season at Headingley, Leeds on Saturday 16 October 1965.

=== Hull Kingston Rovers ===
In October 1968, Hull Kingston Rovers signed Clawson in an exchange deal which saw Geoff Wriglesworth and Frank Foster join Bradford Northern. He went to make 111 appearances for the club before joining Leeds in 1971.

=== Leeds ===
Clawson played for Leeds in the 1971–72 Challenge Cup Final during the 1971–72 season at Wembley Stadium, but ended up on the losing side in a 13–16 defeat by St. Helens. A week later, he played and scored three conversions in Leeds 9–5 victory over St Helens in the Championship Final during the 1971–72 season at Station Road, Swinton on Saturday 20 May 1972, and was awarded the Harry Sunderland Trophy for his man of the match performance.

Clawson played at prop (replaced by interchange/substitute Tony Fisher) and scored 5-goals in Leeds' 36–9 victory over Dewsbury in the 1972–73 Yorkshire Cup Final during the 1972–73 season at Odsal Stadium, Bradford on Saturday 7 October 1972, and played at prop in the 7–2 victory over Wakefield Trinity in the 1973–74 Yorkshire Cup Final during the 1973–74 season at Headingley, Leeds on Saturday 20 October 1973.

Clawson played at prop and scored two goals in Leeds' 12–7 victory over Salford in the 1972–73 Player's No.6 Trophy Final during the 1972–73 season at Fartown Ground, Huddersfield on Saturday 24 March 1973.

Clawson later joined Oldham.

=== Later career ===
Clawson spent 12 months at Oldham before moving on to York. He went to have second spells at Bradford Northern and Featherstone Rovers, and also played for Wakefield Trinity, Huddersfield and Hull F.C., where he played his last match in 1980, aged 40.

=== Australian career ===
During the 1970s Clawson captained-coached in Australia's Newcastle Rugby League with the Souths club. He was later named in a South Newcastle team of the century in 2010.

=== International honours ===
Terry Clawson won caps for Great Britain while at Featherstone Rovers in 1962 against France (2 matches), while at Leeds in the 1972 Rugby League World Cup against Australia, France and Australia, while at Oldham in 1973 against Australia (3 matches), and in 1974 against France (2 matches), Australia (2 matches), and New Zealand (2 matches).

== Genealogical information ==
Terry Clawson is the father of Martin, who played in the 1980s for Bradford Northern, and Neil, who played in the 1980s and 1990s for Featherstone Rovers, Oldham and Swinton.
