= John O'Neill (rugby league) =

Australian RL coach and former Australia international rugby league footballer

Personal information
- Born: 9 May 1943 Griffith, New South Wales, Australia
- Died: 9 August 1999 (aged 56) Sydney, New South Wales, Australia

Playing information
- Position: Prop
Club
Years	Team	Pld	T	G	FG	P
1965–71	South Sydney	128	11	0	0	33
1972–74	Manly-Warringah	51	3	0	0	9
1975–76	South Sydney	23	0	0	0	0
	Total	202	14	0	0	42
Representative
Years	Team	Pld	T	G	FG	P
1967–71	New South Wales	5	0	0	0	0
1970–71	City Firsts	2	0	0	0	0
1970–75	Australia	10	2	0	0	6

Coaching information
Club
Years	Team	Gms	W	D	L	W%
1977	South Sydney	22	3	0	19	14

John O'Neill (9 May 1943 – 9 August 1999) was an Australian representative rugby league prop whose club career was spent with South Sydney and Manly-Warringah during the 1960s and early 1970s. He made 2 Test appearances for the Australian national representative side; represented in 7 World Cup matches in two World Cups and in one World Championship match; and played in 5 Kangaroo tour matches in 1973.

== Early life and club career ==
Born in Griffith but reared in the northern town of Gunnedah, in his early twenties John O'Neill showed promise in appearances for Country against both City and the French tourists and was spotted by Sydney premiership talent scouts 1964.

O'Neill came to South Sydney in 1965 and his aggressive play in the scrums and charging runs close to the rucks caused him to be noticed. His toughness and solidity earned him the nickname "Lurch", and in his debut season O'Neill played for South Sydney in the Grand final against the champion St George team. A tall and strongly framed man, O'Neill was able to develop consistently as he built up his weight from 88 kilograms or 13 stone 12 pounds in 1965 to 104 kilograms or 16 stone 5 pounds by 1970. Between 1967 and 1971 he played in five grand finals for South Sydney, winning all but the 1969 contest against Balmain.

In 1971 the financial problems at South Sydney caused him along with teammate Ray Branighan to leave for Manly until the end of 1974. There O'Neill played in two more premiership sides, and his battle with Cronulla strongman Cliff Watson in the brutal 1973 grand final (won by Manly 10–7) is regarded as one of the toughest conflicts seen in the Australian game.

== Representative career ==
O'Neill first played for New South Wales in 1967, and made his international debut in the 1970 World Cup. It was in this match that his remarkable strength in the toughest conflicts first showed itself. He continued to hit opponents in a way that would have been remarkable for anyone with a split shin, and refused to take first aid even when blood spilt into his sock! John O'Neill remained a regular international player until he retired, He is listed on the Australian Players Register as Kangaroo No. 449.

In 1975, still a major force in representative rugby league, O'Neill returned to South Sydney. Paradoxically, though he was superb in representative games, he was disappointing in club rugby league and retired during the 1976 season. O'Neill coached South Sydney in 1977 but could win only one of the last eighteen games and he stood down.

During his playing days, O'Neill had developed a highly profitable building business with his Rabbitoh teammate Gary Stevens, which by 1977 would prevent him from devoting his attention fully to coaching. In the 1980s, he used the profits from this business to build a home at Lake Conjola.

== Death and accolades ==
In 1995, after being named in Australia's best rugby league team since the limited tackle rule was introduced, O'Neill was diagnosed with cancer. He fought a long battle, but died on 9 August 1999 at the age of 56. It is estimated that 4,000 people attended his funeral, showing the respect in which he was held.

In 1990, O'Neill was named in the front row for Manly in their best team from 1947 to 1990. Later in 2006 he was named in the front row for Manly's 60th anniversary Dream Team.

In 2004 he was named by Souths in their South Sydney Dream Team, consisting of 17 players and a coach representing the club from 1908 through to 2004.In February 2008, O'Neill was named in the list of Australia's 100 Greatest Players (1908–2007) which was commissioned by the NRL and ARL to celebrate the code's centenary year in Australia.
