= Elwyn Walters =

Australia international rugby league footballer

Personal information
- Full name: Elwyn Aubrey Walters
- Born: 25 June 1943 (age 83) Murwillumbah, New South Wales, Australia

Playing information
- Position: Prop, Hooker, Second-row
Club
Years	Team	Pld	T	G	FG	P
1967–73	South Sydney	129	17	0	0	51
1974–76	Eastern Suburbs	58	5	0	0	15
1977	Manly-Warringah	5	0	0	0	0
	Total	192	22	0	0	66
Representative
Years	Team	Pld	T	G	FG	P
1969–74	New South Wales	11	2	0	0	6
1969–74	Australia	20	2	0	0	6
1969–74	NSW City	5	1	0	0	3

Elwyn Aubrey Walters (born 25 June 1943) is an Australian former rugby league footballer who played for South Sydney and Eastern Suburbs clubs and for the Australian national side.

Walters came to South Sydney in the mid-1960s from the Brisbane Norths club. He was a tough hooker noted for his dummy half play and uncompromising defence.

== Club career ==
He won five premierships, three with Souths (1967, 1968 and 1970) and two with Eastern Suburbs (1974 and 1975). Walters missed the premiership victory by Souths in the 1971 grand final through injury. During the 1976 NSWRFL season, Walters played in the forwards, helping Eastern Suburbs to victory in their unofficial 1976 World Club Challenge match against British champions St. Helens in Sydney.

Walters played 129 games for South Sydney, 58 matches for Eastern Suburbs and 5 games for Manly.

In 2004 he was named by Souths in their South Sydney Dream Team, consisting of 17 players and a coach representing the club from 1908 through to 2004.

== Representative career ==
Whilst playing for South Sydney, Walters was selected to represent Australia on two Kangaroo tours of Great Britain and France (1968 and 1973) and for two World Cup tournaments (1970 and 1972).

He represented NSW in 11 matches and played in 12 test matches for Australia.

== Sources ==
- Andrews, Malcolm (2006) The ABC of Rugby League, Austn Broadcasting Corpn, Sydney
