= Mike Stephenson =

English rugby league footballer and commentator

Mike Stephenson MBE
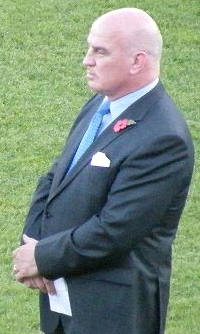
- Stephenson in 2008

Personal information
- Full name: Michael Stephenson
- Born: 27 January 1947 (age 79) Dewsbury, England

Playing information
- Position: Hooker
Club
Years	Team	Pld	T	G	FG	P
1966–73	Dewsbury	219+1	53	0	0	159
1974–78	Penrith Panthers	69	21	0	0	63
	Total	289	74	0	0	222
Representative
Years	Team	Pld	T	G	FG	P
1971–72	Great Britain	5	2	0	0	6
1969–73	Yorkshire	7+1	1	0	0	3
1969	GB Under 24	1	0	0	0	0

Coaching information
Club
Years	Team	Gms	W	D	L	W%
1975	Penrith	16	6	0	10	38

Michael (Stevo) Stephenson MBE (born 27 January 1947) is an English former rugby league commentator and rugby league footballer.

Stephenson was born in Dewsbury, West Riding of Yorkshire. He is commonly known as "Stevo", the nickname that he is known by in rugby league and on TV, played at club level for Dewsbury, and Australian side Penrith, and also played for Yorkshire and Great Britain, with whom he won the 1972 Rugby League World Cup. Stephenson played in the hooker position for most of his playing career.

Stephenson was responsible for the setting-up of the Rugby League Heritage Centre at the George Hotel in Huddersfield.

He was appointed an MBE (Member of the Most Excellent order of the British Empire), for his services to rugby league and sports broadcasting in the New Year Honours List 2017.

== Playing career ==
Stephenson began his professional playing career at his hometown club Dewsbury in 1966, after being signed from local amateur club Shaw Cross RLFC. He went on to make his Great Britain debut in Castleford in 1971 against the touring New Zealand side. His greatest moment in international rugby league was being a member of Great Britain's victorious 1972 World Cup-winning side; Stevo scored a try against Australia in the World Cup Final.

Stephenson won caps for Great Britain while at Dewsbury in 1971 against New Zealand, in 1972 against France, and in the 1972 World Cup against France, New Zealand and Australia.

Stephenson's time in the Dewsbury first team coincided with an upturn in the club's fortunes on the pitch. He played in Dewsbury's 9–36 defeat by Leeds in the 1972–73 Yorkshire Cup Final and scored 2 tries in Dewsbury's 22–13 victory over Leeds in the 1972-73 Championship Final. He left Dewsbury after their championship winning season in 1973 to join Australian Rugby League outfit Penrith. He played 69 games for Penrith between 1974 and 1978, scoring 21 tries. Stevo was also player-coach of the side for a brief, unsuccessful spell. He ended his playing career in 1978 and settled in Sydney.

== Broadcasting career ==
Stevo began his broadcasting career in Australia with brief spells at radio and television stations in Sydney. He first appeared on British airwaves in 1988, when he was invited to co-commentate on the rugby league Ashes series in Australia for BBC Radio 2 with Eddie Hemmings.

In 1990, Stevo joined the new British satellite television broadcaster BSB as a match summariser for its Rugby League coverage. At BSB, he joined up again with Hemmings, who had also been signed up by the broadcaster. The pairing were kept together when BSB and Sky Television merged to form BSkyB in 1991; the combined satellite TV network inherited BSB's rugby league TV contract. Eddie and Stevo became household names and synonymous with Super League and Rugby League, providing the voices of the sport for the first 20 years of Super League.

Stephenson announced at the start of the 2016 season that he would be retiring from commentating at the end of the season after 26 years. His last game on the microphone was the 2016 Super League Grand Final.

== Honours ==
=== Club ===
- RFL Championship: 1972–73

=== International ===
- World Cup: 1972

=== Individual ===
- Harry Sunderland Trophy: 1973
- Member of the Order of the British Empire (MBE): 2016

Achievements
Preceded by Bill Ashurst	Rugby league transfer record Dewsbury to Penrith; 1973–78	Succeeded by Steve Norton
