= Gary Stevens (rugby league) =

Australian rugby league footballer (1944–2025)

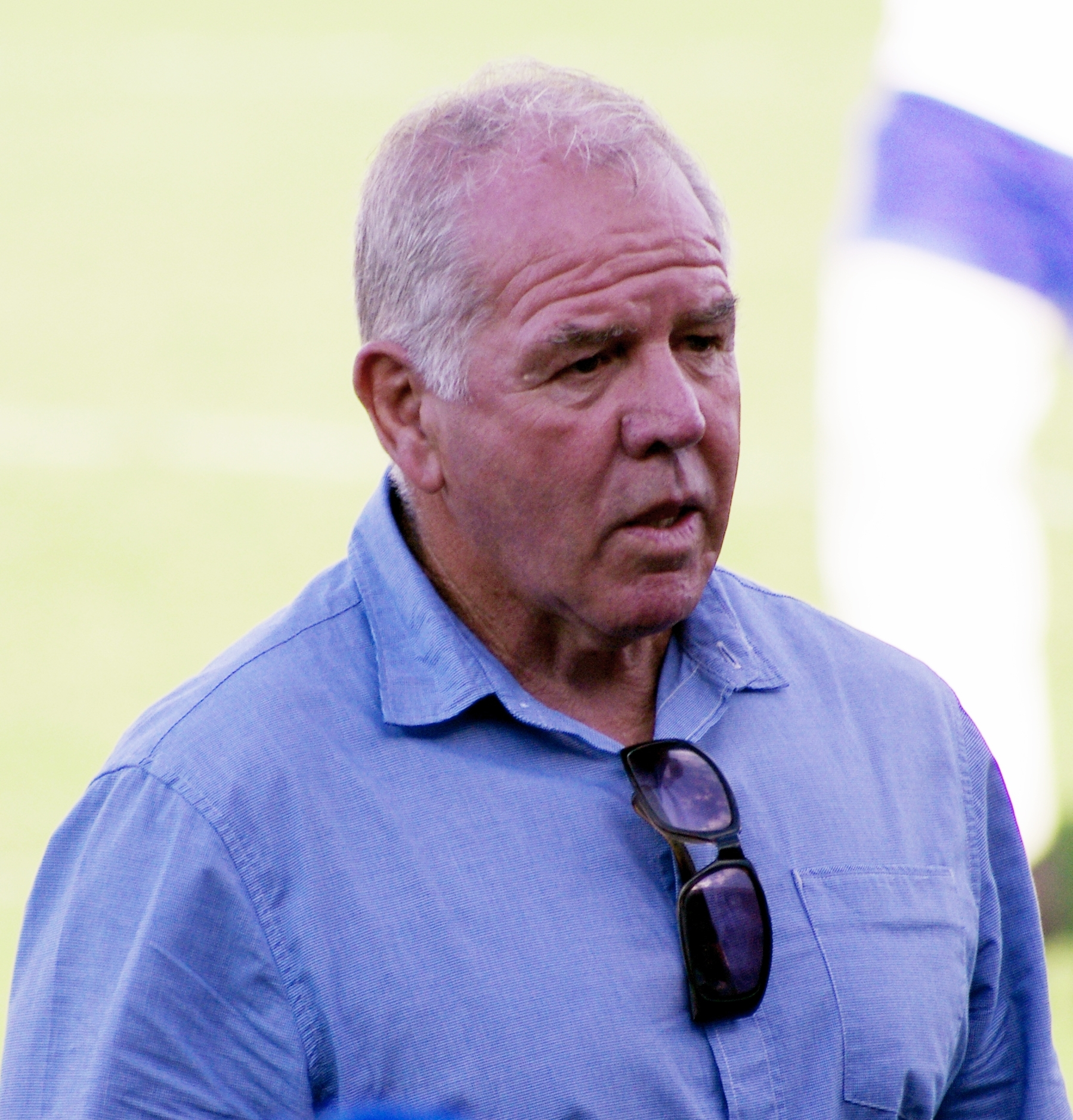

Personal information
- Born: 4 January 1944; Sydney, New South Wales, Australia
- Died: 29 January 2025 (aged 81)

Playing information
- Position: Second-row
Club
Years	Team	Pld	T	G	FG	P
1965–76	South Sydney	163	12	0	0	36
1977–78	Canterbury Bulldogs	26	0	0	0	0
	Total	189	12	0	0	36
Representative
Years	Team	Pld	T	G	FG	P
1972–75	Australia	5	0	0	0	0
- Relatives: Arthur Oxford (grandfather)

Gary Stevens (4 January 1944 – 29 January 2025) was an Australian rugby league footballer, a hard tackling second-row forward, of the 1960s and 1970s for the South Sydney Rabbitohs, Canterbury-Bankstown Bulldogs and the Australian national representative side. He is the grandson of Souths club great Arthur Oxford.

== Club career ==
Stevens played 163 games with South Sydney between 1965 and 1976, scoring 12 tries. He played in the 1970 and 1971 victorious Rabbitohs Grand Final teams. A Souths junior, he was promoted to grade in 1964. He eventually captained Souths in 1976.

At the end of the 1976 season Stevens joined Canterbury-Bankstown with whom he played 26 games in 1977 and 1978.

== Representative career ==
Stevens represented Australia in five Test matches (1972–1975) and appeared six times for New South Wales (1972–1975). Stevens went on to play in the 1972 Australian World Cup campaign before touring Great Britain with the victorious 1973 Australian Kangaroos. He played against France in 1973 before representing Australia in two tests against the touring Great Britain side in 1974. The following year he was also selected in Australia's World Cup squad.

== Death ==
Stevens died on 29 January 2025, at the age of 81.

== Sources ==
- Canterbury Bulldogs profile
- The Encyclopaedia of Rugby League Players – South Sydney Rabbitohs, Alan Whiticker & Glen Hudson, Bas Publishing, 2005.
