= 1975 Eastern Suburbs Roosters season =

← 1974	1976 →

The 1975 Eastern Suburbs season was the 68th in the club's history. They competed in the NSWRFL's 1975 Premiership, winning all but 3 of their 25 matches and finishing premiers, as well as the 1975 Amco Cup, which they also won.

Easts' 1975 season has since been described as one of the most dominant in Australian rugby league history.

== Team line-up ==
Jack Gibson (Coach),

- Arthur Beetson,
- John Brass,
- Ron Coote,
- Russell Fairfax,
- Mark Harris,
- Grant Hedger,
- Ian Mackay,
- Johnny Mayes,
- Bill Mullins,
- Des O'Reilly,
- John Peard,
- Bruce Pickett,
- Barry 'Bunny' Reilly,
- John Rheinberger,
- Ian Schubert,
- Kevin Stevens,
- Elwyn Walters.

== Ladder ==
	Team	Pld	W	D	L	PF	PA	PD	Pts
1	Eastern Suburbs	22	20	0	2	431	198	+233	40
2	Manly-Warringah	22	15	0	7	439	314	+125	30
3	St. George	22	12	2	8	341	294	+47	26
4	Canterbury-Bankstown	22	11	2	9	330	287	+43	24
5	Western Suburbs	22	10	2	10	365	289	+76	21
6	Parramatta	22	10	1	11	391	373	+18	21
7	Balmain	22	10	1	11	288	357	-69	21
8	Cronulla-Sutherland	22	9	1	12	370	375	-5	19
9	North Sydney	22	9	0	13	322	414	-92	18
10	Newtown	22	7	2	13	349	422	-73	16
11	Penrith	22	7	1	14	312	452	-140	15
12	South Sydney	22	6	0	16	298	461	-163	12

- Western Suburbs were stripped of one competition point due to an illegal replacement in one game.

== Season summary ==
- Eastern Suburbs won their 11th Premiership by a record margin, defeating St George in the decider 38–0.It was also their biggest win of the season.
- Eastern Suburbs won the Minor Premiership, losing just 2 matches during the regular season.
- Eastern Suburbs won the club championship
- Eastern Suburb won the 1975 Amco Cup
- Easts' Halfback Johnny Mayes was the premiership's leading try scorer.
- Eastern Suburbs won a record 19 consecutive matches during the season.
- Representatives : Arthur Beetson(AUS). John Brass(Aus), Ron Coote(Aus), Mark Harris(Aus), Ian Mackay(Aus), Johnny Mayes(Aus)

== Results ==
Premiership

- Round1, Eastern Suburbs 15(?)Defeated Balmain 12(?) played at Sydney Sports Ground
- Round 2, St George 11(?) defeated Eastern Suburbs 3 at(?) Kogarah Jubilee Oval.
- Round 3, Cronulla Sutherland 17(?) defeated Eastern Suburbs 13)(?)
- Round 4, Eastern Suburbs 22 defeated Manly Warringah 16 at Brookvale Oval
- Round 5, Eastern Suburbs 22 defeated Western Suburbs 16 at the Sydney Cricket Ground.
- Round 6, Eastern Suburbs 25 defeated Penrith 12 at Penrith Park.
- Round 7, Eastern Suburbs 29 defeated Canterbury Bankstown 10 at Sydney Cricket Ground.
- Round 8,
- Eastern Suburbs 15(Schubert, Harris, Walters Tries; Brass 3 Goals) defeated Newtown 6(D. Oliveri, J. Bradstock Tries) at Henson Park.
- Eastern Suburbs 7(Schubert Try; Brass 2 Goals) defeated Balmain 5(M.Fish Try; J. Cunningham Goal) at Leichhardt Oval.

Preceded by 1974	Season; 1975	Succeeded by 1976
