= 1974 Eastern Suburbs season =

← 1973	1975 →

The 1974 Eastern Suburbs season was the 68th in the club's history. They competed in the NSWRFL's 1974 premiership, finishing the regular season as minor premiers. They went on to play in and win the grand final. Easts also competed in the 1974 Amco Cup.

== Player line-up ==
- Ian Baker
- Greg Bandiera
- Arthur Beetson
- John Brass
- Harry Cameron
- Ron Coote
- John Dykes
- Russell Fairfax
- Eric Ferguson
- Laurie Freier
- Mark Harris
- Les Hayes
- Kel Jones
- Pat Kelly
- Doug Lucas
- Ian Mackay
- Johnny Mayes
- Arthur Mountier
- Bill Mullins
- Greg McCarthy
- Graham Olling
- John Peard
- Bruce Pickett
- Jim Porter
- Barry Reilly
- Mick Souter
- Kevin Stevens
- Terry Stevens
- Ray Strudwick
- Elwyn Walters

== 1974 Premiership ==
Results;

- Round 1, Eastern Suburbs 31(7 Tries; 5 Goals) defeated Penrith 6(2 Tries)
- Round 2, Eastern Suburbs 44(10 Tries; 7 Goals) defeated Cronulla Sutherland 13(3 Tries; 2 Goals)

== 1974 Pre-Season Cup ==
Wills Pre-season Cup Results;

- Final, Eastern Suburbs 43(Pat Kelly 3, Harris 2, Mullins 2, Walters, Bruce Pickett Tries; Brass 8 Goals) defeated South Sydney 0

== Season Highlights ==
- Eastern Suburbs won their 10th Premiership, their first in 29 years, defeating Canterbury Bankstown 19–4 in the decider.
- Eastern Suburbs won the Minor Premiership.
- Eastern Suburbs won the Club Championship.
- Eastern Suburbs won the Pre-Season Cup defeating South Sydney 43–0 in the final.

Preceded by 1973	Season; 1974	Succeeded by 1975
