= 1974 NSWRFL season =

Rugby league competition

1974 New South Wales Rugby Football League
- Teams: 12
- Premiers: Eastern Suburbs (10th title)
- Minor premiers: Eastern Suburbs (12th title)
- Matches played: 138
- Points scored: 4382
- Total attendance: 1,278,823
- Top points scorer: Graham Eadie (216)
- Wooden spoon: Balmain Tigers (2nd spoon)
- Rothmans Medal: Graham Eadie
- Top try-scorer(s): Kevin Junee (23); Bill Mullins (23)

The 1974 New South Wales Rugby Football League premiership was the 67th season of Sydney's professional rugby league football competition, Australia's first. Twelve teams, including six of 1908's foundation clubs and another six from across Sydney, competed for the J. J. Giltinan Shield during the season, which culminated in a grand final match for the WD & HO Wills Cup between the Eastern Suburbs and Canterbury-Bankstown clubs. This season NSWRFL teams also competed for the inaugural Amco Cup.

== Season summary ==
The preseason saw Eastern Suburbs defeat South Sydney 43–0 in the final of the preseason competition at the Sydney Sports Ground, while Parramatta beat Cronulla 20–8 in the playoff for third at Belmore Oval.

This season the NSWRFL made the financial commitment to bring suburban football grounds up to a higher standard in order to take more games to the fans on a home-and-away basis.

Twenty-two regular season rounds were played from March until August, resulting in a top five of Eastern Suburbs, Manly-Warringah, Canterbury-Bankstown, Western Suburbs and Souths who battled it out in the finals. This season would mark the first time since 1950 where St. George failed to make the finals and the first time since 1911 that Balmain would finish last and take out the wooden spoon.

The 1974 Rothmans Medal was awarded to Manly-Warringah's fullback Graham Eadie. Rugby League Week awarded their player of the year award to Eastern Suburbs' forward Arthur Beetson.

=== Teams ===
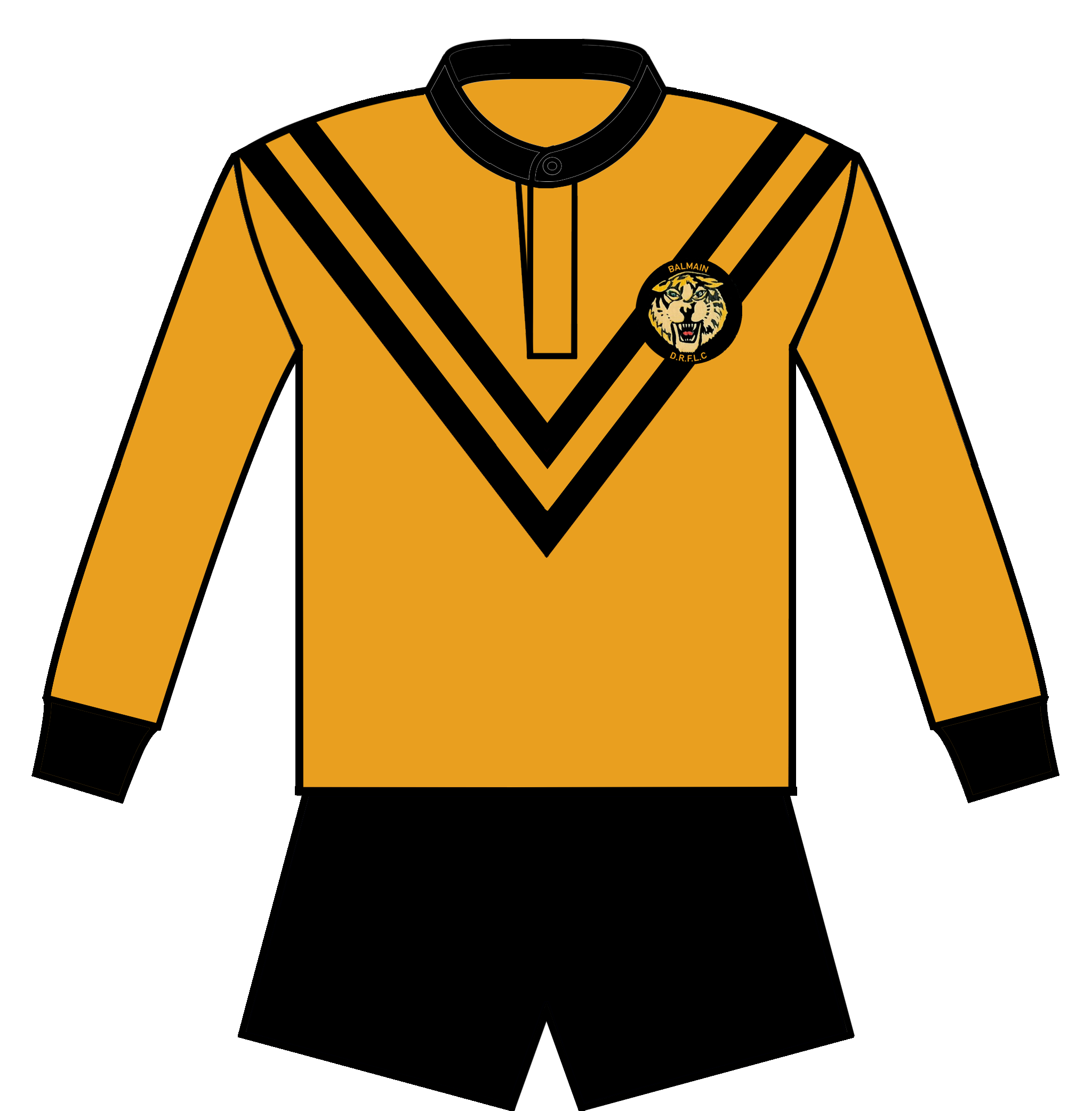
Balmain Tigers 67th season Ground(s): Leichhardt Oval & Lidcombe Oval; Coach: Alan Mason; Captain: John Spencer

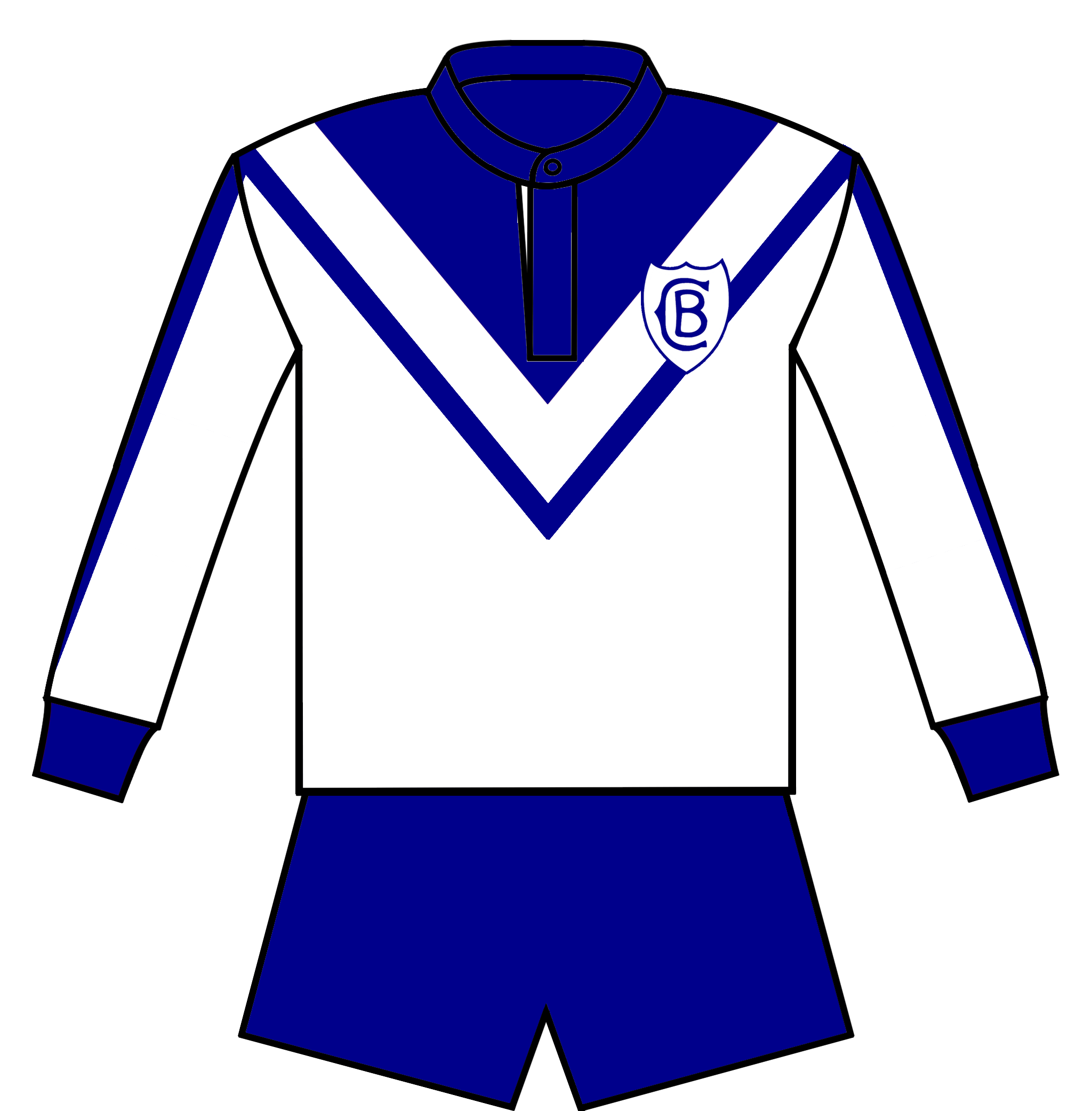
Canterbury-Bankstown 44th season Ground: Belmore Sports Ground; Coach: Malcolm Clift; Captain: Barry Phillis

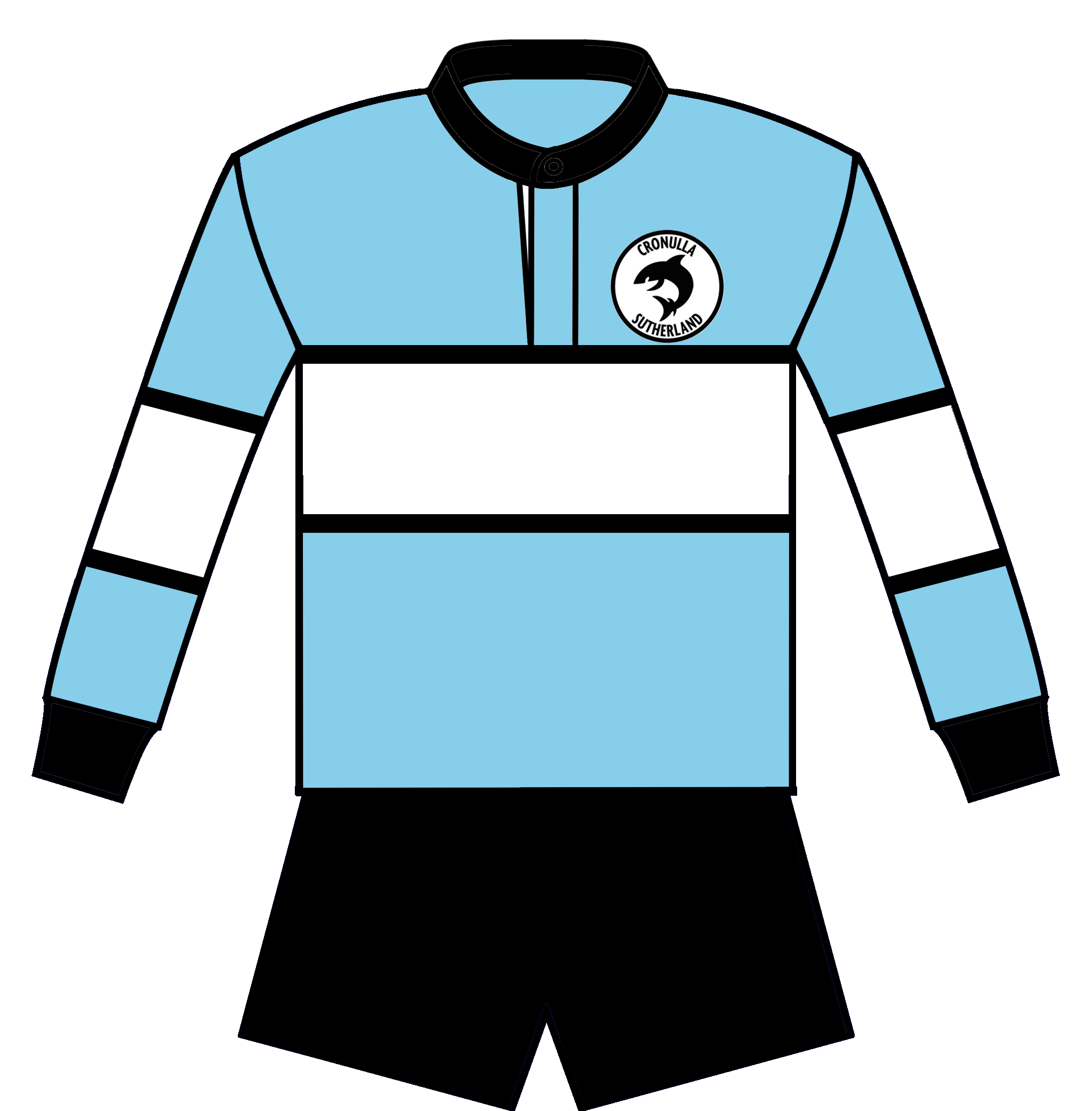
Cronulla-Sutherland 8th season Ground: Endeavour Field; Coach: Noel Thornton; Captain: Greg Pierce

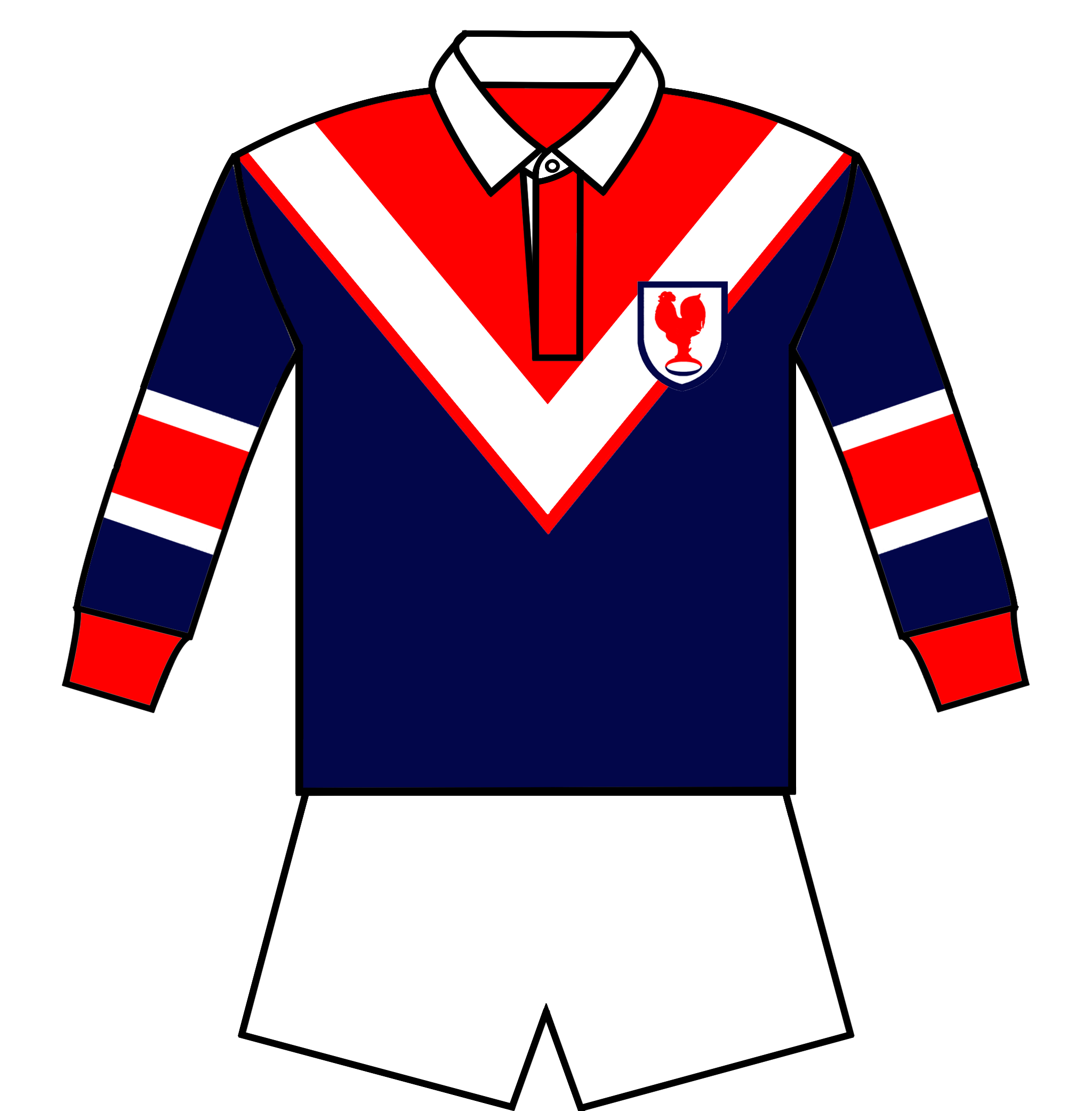
Eastern Suburbs 67th season Ground: Sydney Sports Ground; Coach: Jack Gibson; Captain: Arthur Beetson

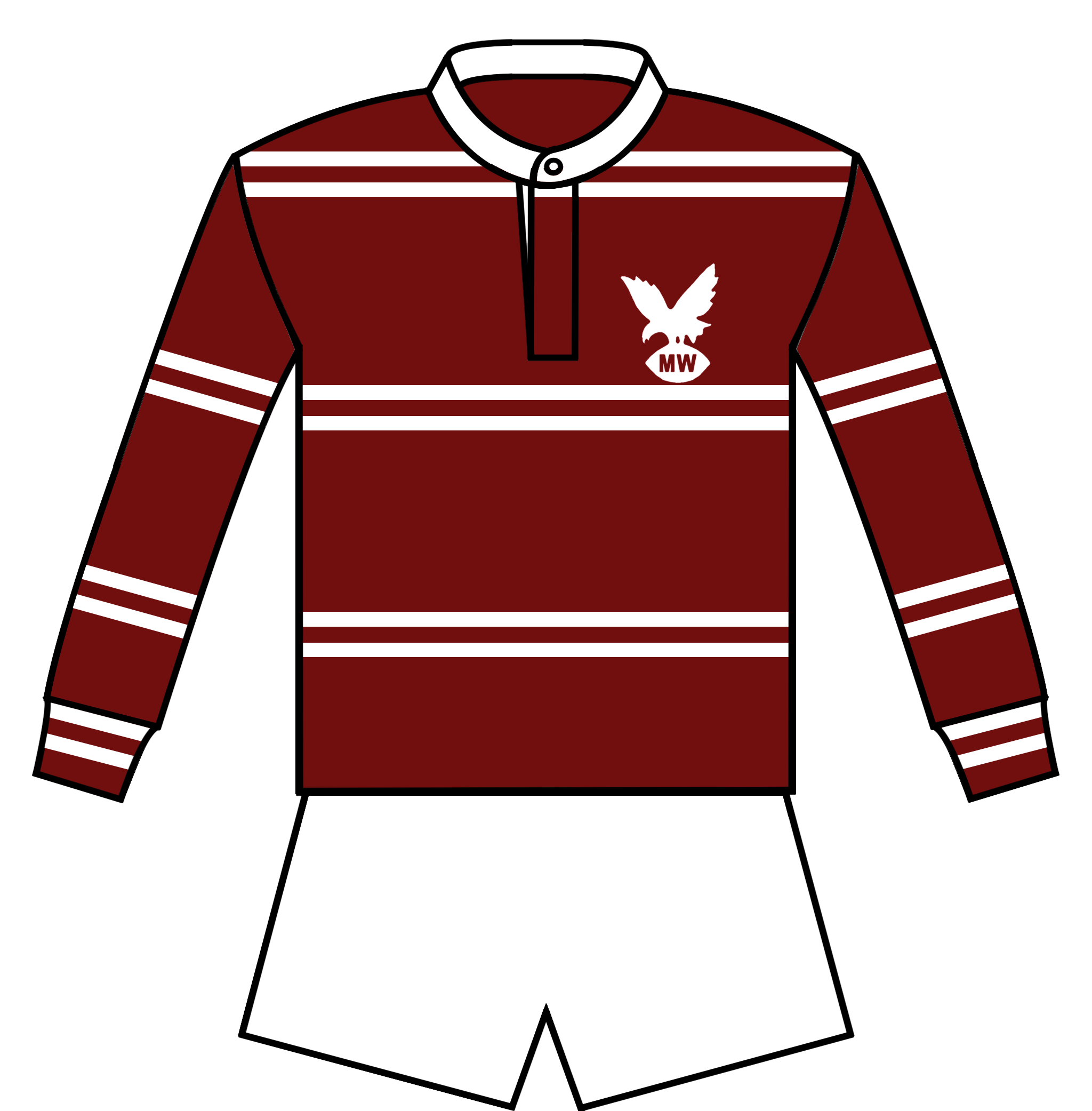
Manly-Warringah 28th season Ground: Brookvale Oval; Coach: Ron Willey; Captain: Fred Jones

Newtown 67th season Ground: Henson Park; Coach: Clarrie Jeffries; Captain: Lionel Williamson

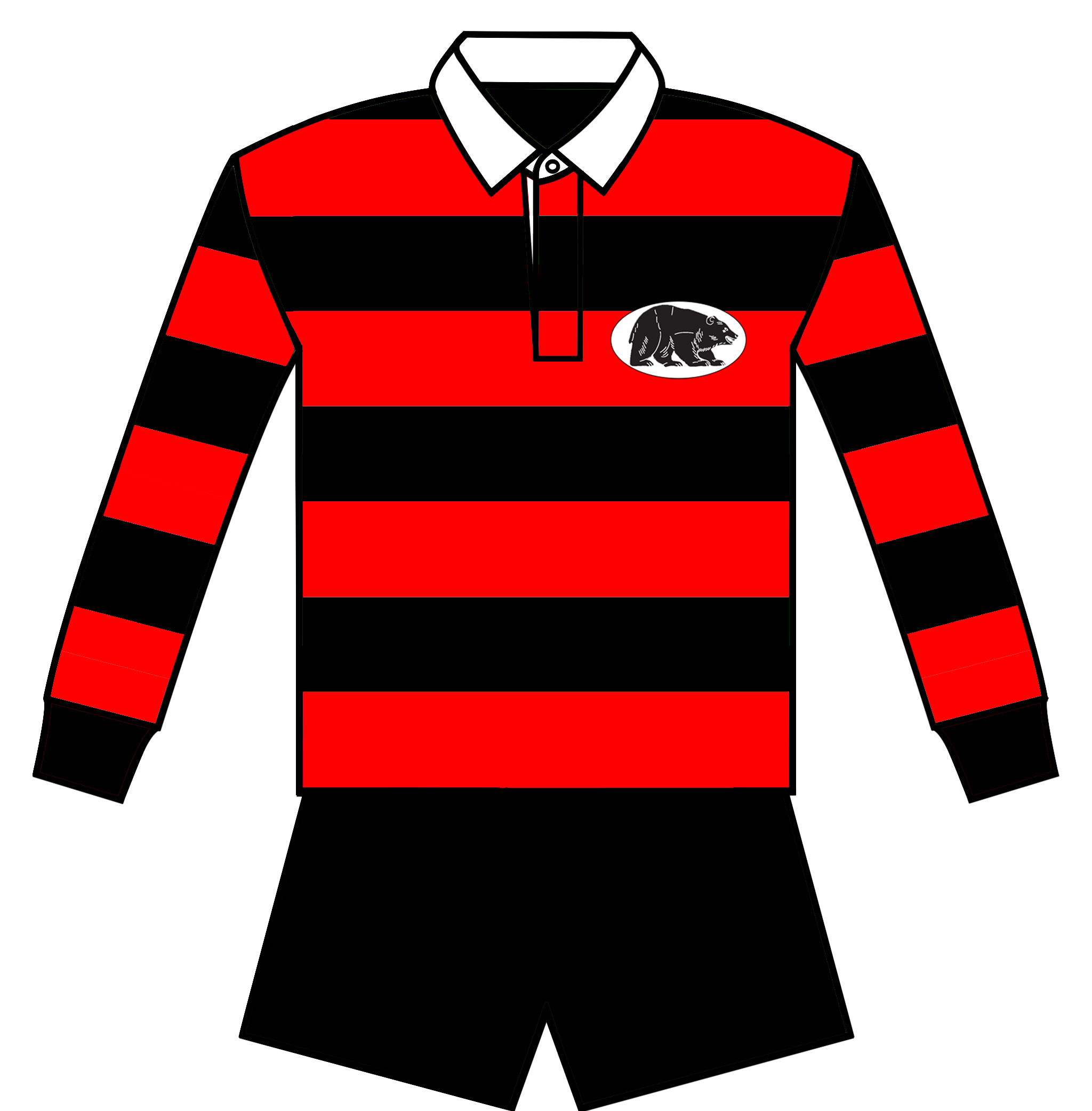
North Sydney 67th season Ground: North Sydney Oval; Coach: Noel Kelly; Captain: Tim Pickup

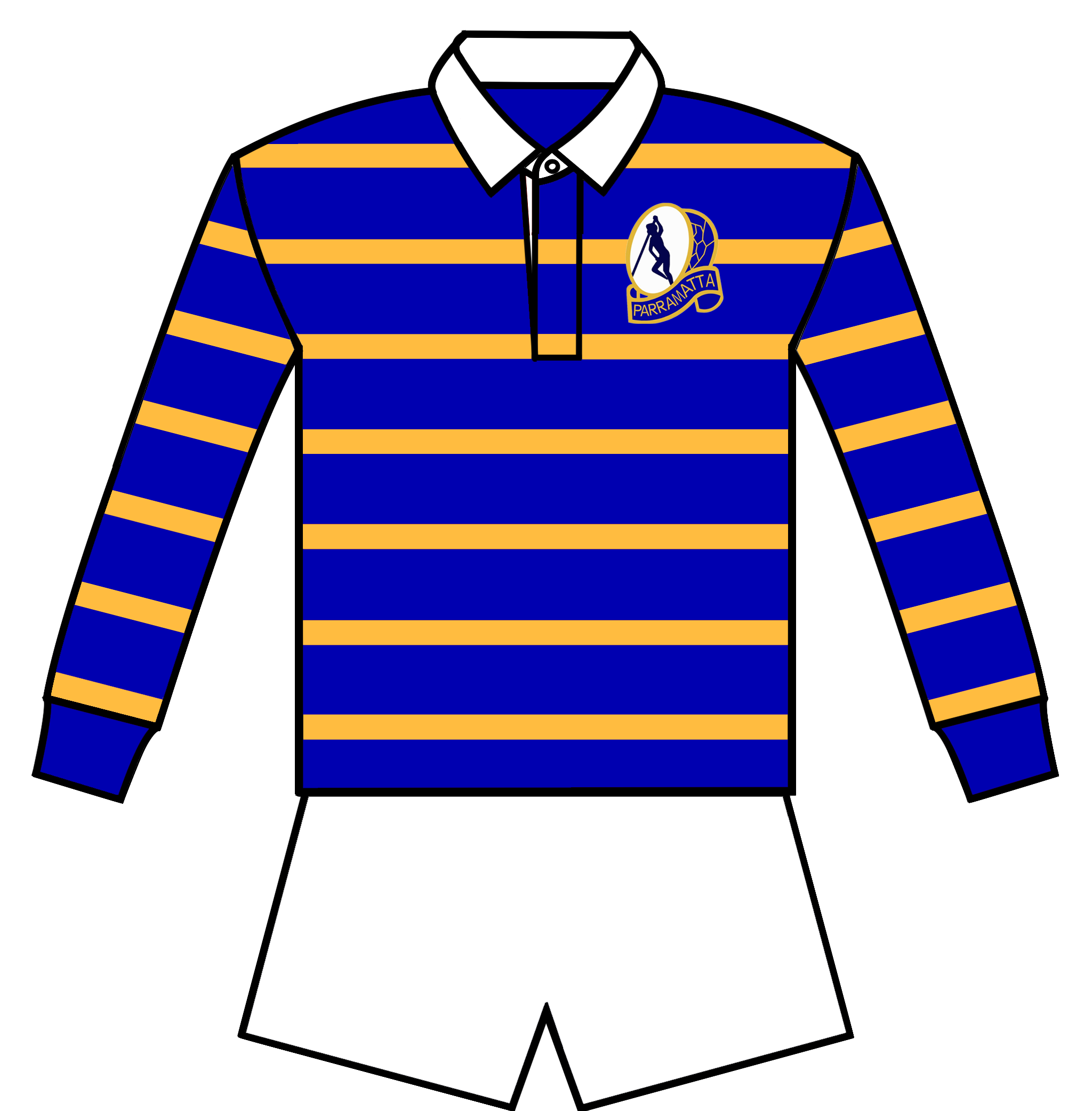
Parramatta 28th season Ground: Cumberland Oval; Coach: Dave Bolton; Captain: Denis Pittard

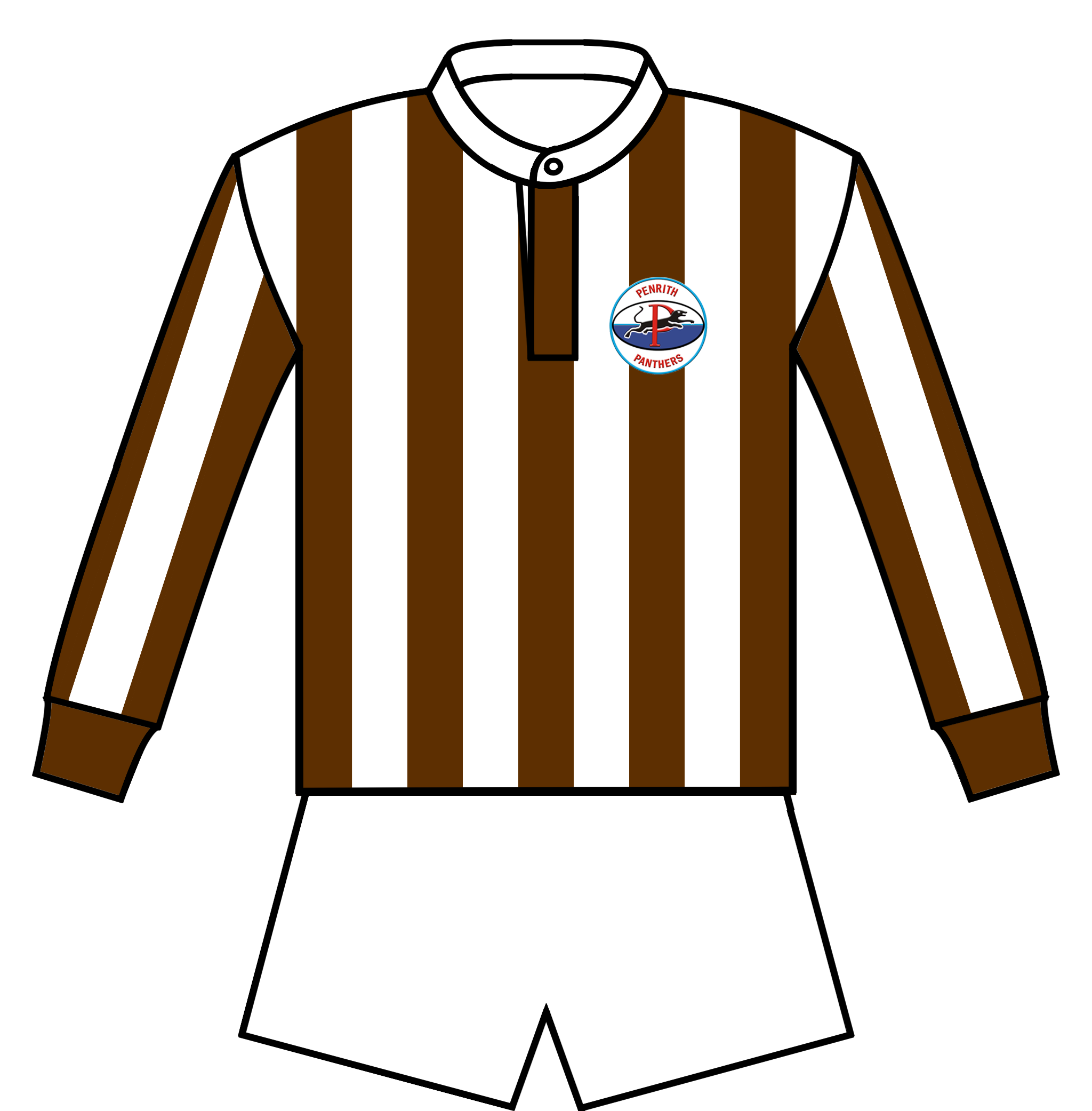
Penrith 8th season Ground: Penrith Football Stadium; Coach: Jack Clare; Captain: Mike Stephenson

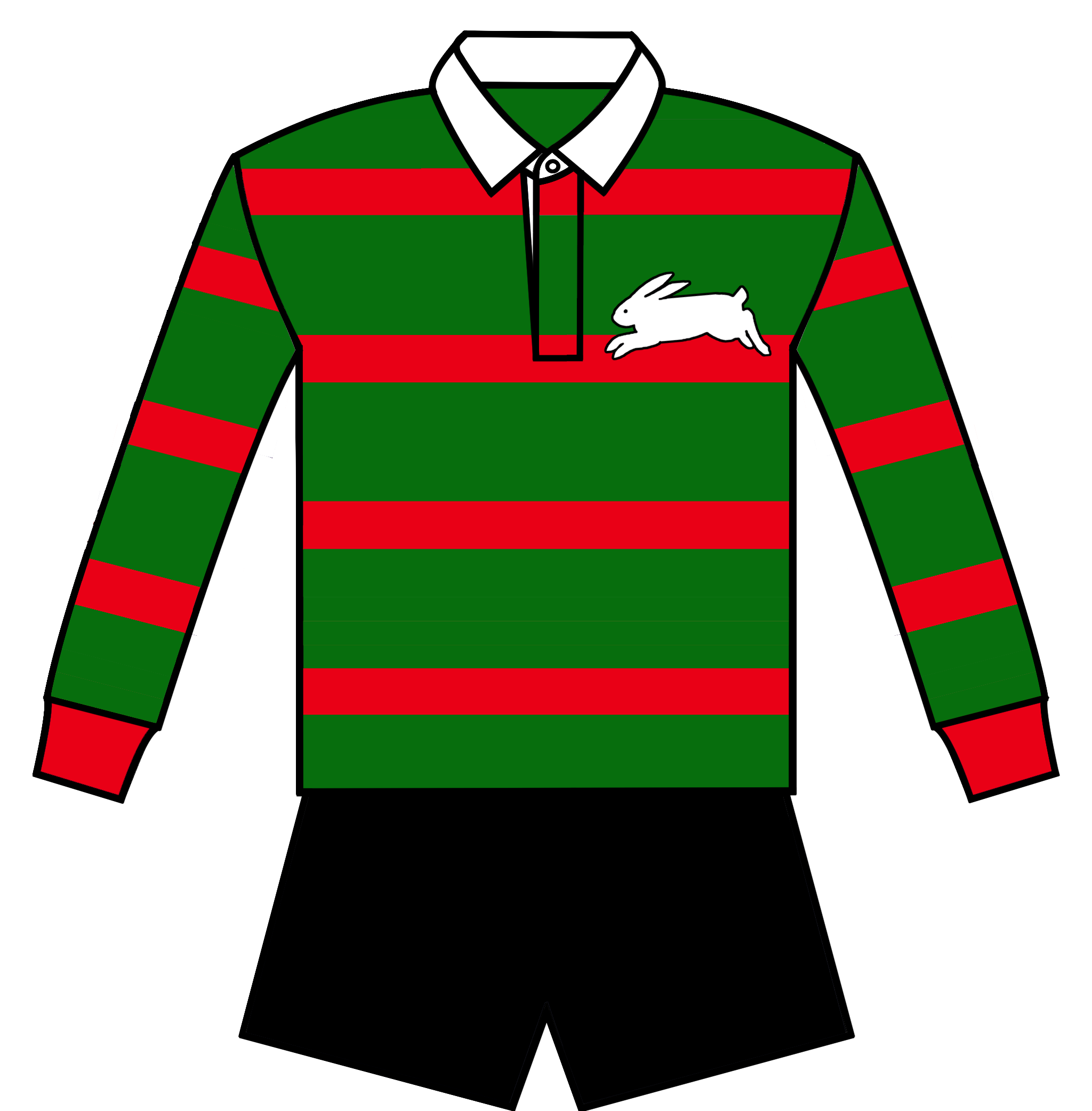
South Sydney 67th season Ground: Redfern Oval; Coach: Clive Churchill; Captain: Bob McCarthy

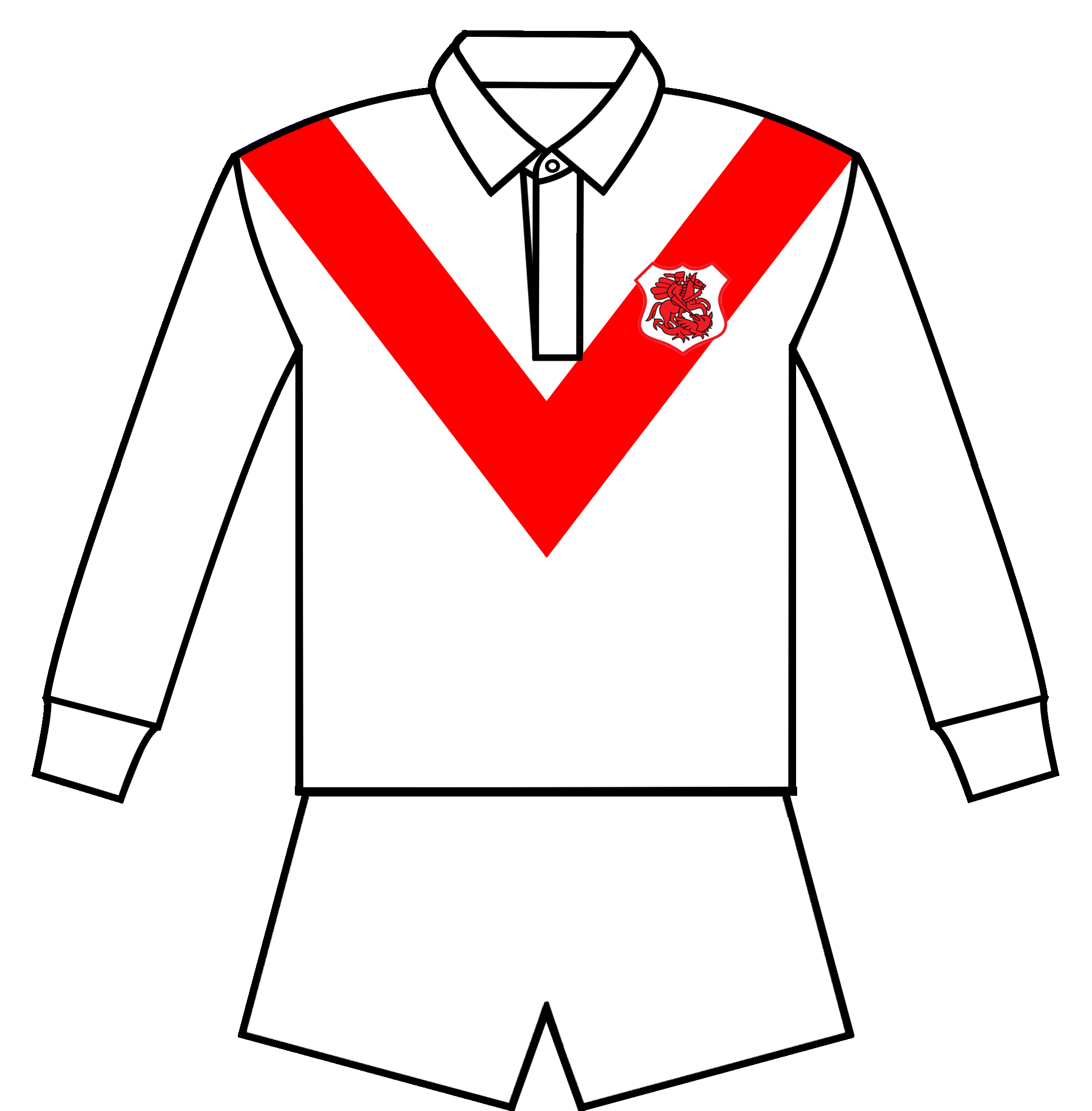
St. George Dragons 54th season Ground: Kogarah Oval; Captain-coach: Graeme Langlands

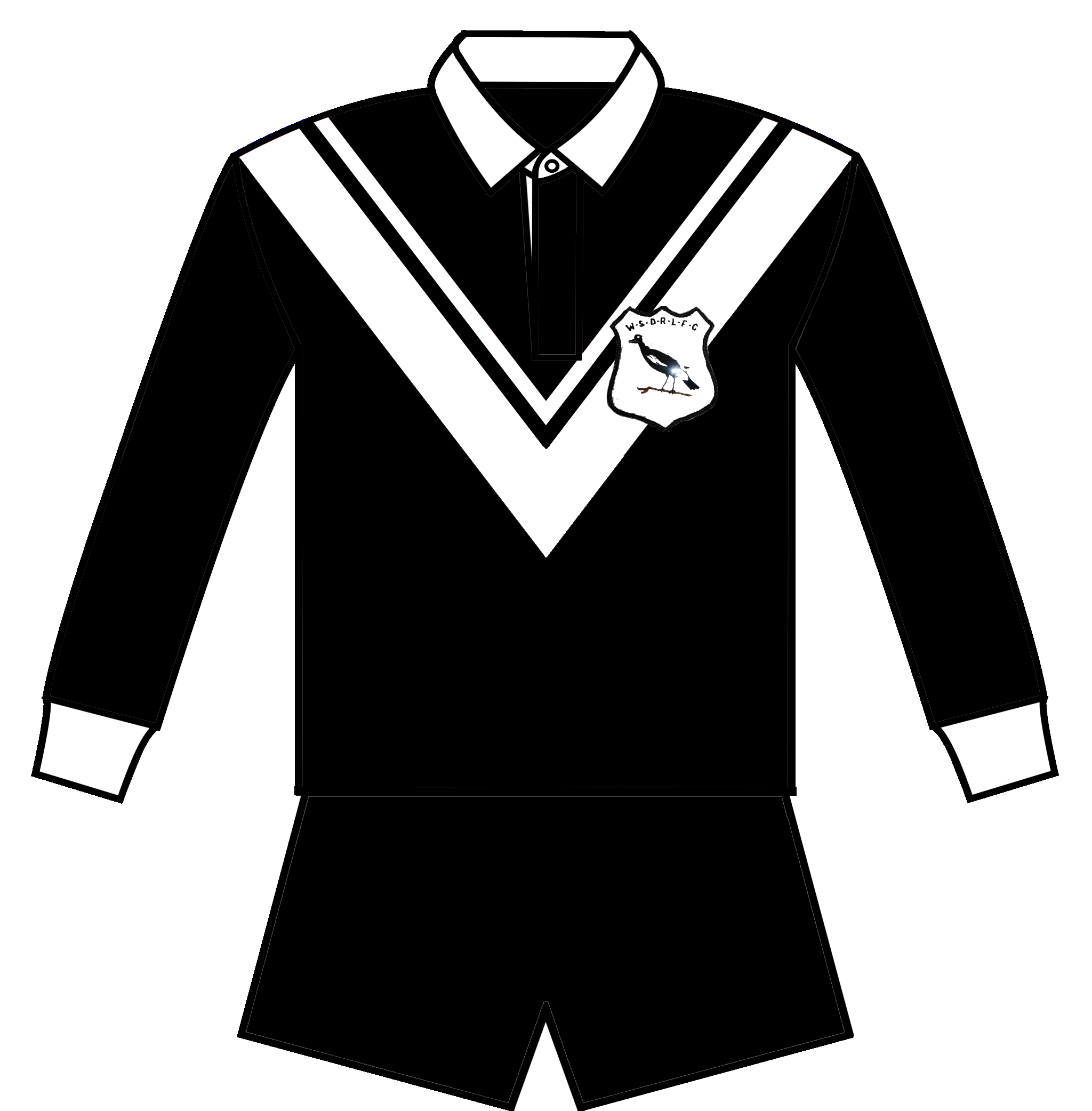
Western Suburbs 67th season Ground(s): Lidcombe Oval & Sydney Sports Ground; Coach: Don Parish; Captain: Tommy Raudonikis

== Regular season ==
Team	1	2	3	4	5	6	7	8	9	10	11	12	13	14	15	16	17	18	19	20	21	22	23	24	25	F1	F2	F3	GF
Balmain Tigers	WES −57	NEW −32	**EAS** **−37**	SOU −8	**CBY** **−8**	PEN −15	CRO −7	STG −10	X	PAR +10	**MAN** **−21**	**NOR**; **0**	X	X	**NEW**; **0**	**WES** **+5**	EAS −26	**SOU** **−5**	CBY −2	**PEN** **+13**	**CRO** **−7**	**STG** **−10**	NOR −4	**PAR** **+18**	MAN −23				
Canterbury-Bankstown	**SOU** **+1**	**STG** **+8**	**PEN** **+17**	**CRO** **+9**	BAL +8	NOR −8	PAR +3	**MAN** **+2**	X	NEW −4	**EAS** **−4**	WES −17	X	X	STG −11	SOU +15	PEN +3	CRO +26	**BAL** **+2**	**NOR** **−4**	**PAR** **+14**	MAN −7	**WES** **+14**	**NEW** **−1**	EAS −10	MAN +6	EAS +2	X	EAS −15
Cronulla-Sutherland Sharks	NEW −8	EAS −31	SOU +2	CBY −9	PEN −4	**STG** **−35**	**BAL** **+7**	NOR +1	**PAR** **+21**	MAN +9	WES −10	X	**NEW** **+1**	X	**EAS** **−25**	X	**SOU** **−10**	**CBY** **−26**	**PEN** **−3**	STG +14	BAL +7	**NOR** **+6**	PAR −17	**MAN** **−1**	**WES** **−12**				
Eastern Suburbs Roosters	**PEN** **+25**	**CRO** **+31**	BAL +37	**NOR** **−9**	**PAR** **+41**	**MAN** **+10**	WES +22	**NEW** **+2**	X	**SOU** **+7**	CBY +4	X	PEN −10	X	CRO +25	STG −1	**BAL** **+26**	NOR +8	PAR +2	MAN +19	**WES** **+8**	NEW +11	**STG** **+32**	SOU +15	**CBY** **+10**	X	**CBY** **−2**	**WES** **+23**	**CBY** **+15**
Manly Warringah Sea Eagles	NOR −12	**PAR** **+36**	STG +12	**WES** **+9**	NEW +22	EAS −10	**SOU** **+13**	CBY −2	X	**CRO** **−9**	BAL +21	X	**NOR** **+33**	**PEN** **+16**	PAR +15	X	**STG** **+18**	WES −5	**NEW** **+27**	**EAS** **−19**	SOU −1	**CBY** **+7**	PEN +15	CRO +1	**BAL** **+23**	**CBY** **−6**	**WES** **−3**		
Newtown Jets	**CRO** **+8**	**BAL** **+32**	NOR +5	PAR +7	**MAN** **−22**	WES +13	**STG** **+25**	EAS −2	SOU −5	**CBY** **+4**	PEN −4	X	CRO −1	X	BAL; 0	X	**NOR** **−2**	**PAR** **+23**	MAN −27	**WES** **−18**	STG −8	**EAS** **−11**	**SOU**; **0**	CBY +1	**PEN** **−1**				
North Sydney Bears	**MAN** **+12**	WES; 0	**NEW** **−5**	EAS +9	**SOU** **−2**	**CBY** **+8**	PEN +5	**CRO** **−1**	X	STG +3	**PAR** **+34**	BAL; 0	MAN −33	X	**WES** **−10**	X	NEW +2	**EAS** **−8**	SOU −5	CBY +4	**PEN** **+6**	CRO −6	**BAL** **+4**	**STG** **−6**	PAR +14				
Parramatta Eels	**STG** **−13**	MAN −36	**WES** **+4**	**NEW** **−7**	EAS −41	SOU +6	**CBY** **−3**	**PEN** **+16**	CRO −21	**BAL** **−10**	NOR −34	X	STG +15	X	**MAN** **−15**	X	WES −6	NEW −23	**EAS** **−2**	**SOU** **−10**	CBY −14	PEN −8	**CRO** **+17**	BAL −18	**NOR** **−14**				
Penrith Panthers	EAS −25	**SOU** **−22**	CBY −17	STG −5	**CRO** **+4**	**BAL** **+15**	**NOR** **−5**	PAR −16	X	WES +6	**NEW** **+4**	X	**EAS** **+10**	MAN −16	SOU −3	X	**CBY** **−3**	**STG** **+1**	CRO +3	BAL +13	NOR −6	**PAR** **+8**	**MAN** **−15**	**WES** **−18**	NEW +1				
South Sydney Rabbitohs	CBY −1	PEN +22	**CRO** **−2**	**BAL** **+8**	NOR +2	**PAR** **−6**	MAN −13	**WES** **+1**	**NEW** **+5**	EAS −7	**STG** **−19**	X	X	X	**PEN** **+3**	**CBY** **−15**	CRO +10	BAL +5	**NOR** **+5**	PAR +10	**MAN** **+1**	WES −8	NEW; 0	**EAS** **−15**	STG +4	**WES** **−16**			
St. George Dragons	PAR +13	CBY −8	**MAN** **−12**	**PEN** **+5**	**WES** **−10**	CRO +35	NEW −25	**BAL** **+10**	X	**NOR** **−3**	SOU +19	X	**PAR** **−15**	X	**CBY** **+11**	**EAS** **+1**	MAN −18	PEN −1	WES −8	**CRO** **−14**	**NEW** **+8**	BAL +10	EAS −32	NOR +6	**SOU** **−4**				
Western Suburbs Magpies	**BAL** **+57**	**NOR**; **0**	PAR −4	MAN −9	STG +10	**NEW** **−13**	**EAS** **−22**	SOU −1	X	**PEN** **−6**	**CRO** **+10**	**CBY** **+17**	X	X	NOR +10	BAL −5	**PAR** **+6**	**MAN** **+5**	**STG** **+8**	NEW +18	EAS −8	**SOU** **+8**	CBY −14	PEN +18	CRO +12	SOU +16	MAN +3	EAS −23	
Team	1	2	3	4	5	6	7	8	9	10	11	12	13	14	15	16	17	18	19	20	21	22	23	24	25	F1	F2	F3	GF

Bold – Home game
X – Bye
Opponent for round listed above margin

=== Ladder ===
	Team	Pld	W	D	L	PF	PA	PD	Pts
1	Eastern Suburbs	22	19	0	3	513	198	+315	38
2	Manly-Warringah	22	15	0	7	526	316	+210	30
3	Canterbury-Bankstown	22	13	0	9	364	308	+56	26
4	Western Suburbs	22	12	1	9	402	305	+97	25
5	South Sydney	22	12	1	9	317	327	-10	25
6	North Sydney	22	11	2	9	297	272	+25	24
7	Newtown	22	9	2	11	278	261	+17	20
8	St. George	22	10	0	12	331	363	-32	20
9	Penrith	22	9	0	13	353	465	-112	18
10	Cronulla-Sutherland	22	9	0	13	314	437	-123	18
11	Parramatta	22	5	0	17	237	454	-217	10
12	Balmain	22	4	2	16	255	481	-226	10

=== Ladder progression ===
- Numbers highlighted in green indicate that the team finished the round inside the top 5.
- Numbers highlighted in blue indicates the team finished first on the ladder in that round.
- Numbers highlighted in red indicates the team finished last place on the ladder in that round.
- Underlined numbers indicate that the team had a bye during that round.

	Team	1	2	3	4	5	6	7	8	9	10	11	12	13	14	15	16	17	18	19	20	21	22	23	24	25
1	Eastern Suburbs Roosters	2	4	6	6	8	10	12	14	14	16	18	18	18	18	20	20	22	24	26	28	30	32	34	36	38
2	Manly Warringah Sea Eagles	0	2	4	6	8	8	10	10	10	10	12	12	14	16	18	18	20	20	22	22	22	24	26	28	30
3	Canterbury-Bankstown	2	4	6	8	10	10	12	14	14	14	14	14	14	14	14	16	18	20	22	22	24	24	26	26	26
4	Western Suburbs Magpies	2	3	3	3	5	5	5	5	5	5	7	9	9	9	11	11	13	15	17	19	19	21	21	23	25
5	South Sydney Rabbitohs	0	2	2	4	6	6	6	8	10	10	10	10	10	10	12	12	14	16	18	20	22	22	23	23	25
6	North Sydney Bears	2	3	3	5	5	7	9	9	9	11	13	14	14	14	14	14	16	16	16	18	20	20	22	22	24
7	Newtown Jets	2	4	6	8	8	10	12	12	12	14	14	14	14	14	15	15	15	17	17	17	17	17	18	20	20
8	St. George Dragons	2	2	2	4	4	6	6	8	8	8	10	10	10	10	12	14	14	14	14	14	16	18	18	20	20
9	Penrith Panthers	0	0	0	0	2	4	4	4	4	6	8	8	10	10	10	10	10	12	14	14	14	16	16	16	18
10	Cronulla-Sutherland Sharks	0	0	2	2	2	2	4	6	8	10	10	10	12	12	12	12	12	12	12	14	16	18	18	18	18
11	Parramatta Eels	0	0	2	2	2	4	4	6	6	6	6	6	8	8	8	8	8	8	8	8	8	8	10	10	10
12	Balmain Tigers	0	0	0	0	0	0	0	0	0	2	2	3	3	3	4	6	6	6	6	8	8	8	8	10	10

== Finals ==
Home	Score	Away	Match Information
Home	Score	Away	Date and Time	Venue	Referee	Crowd
Qualifying Finals
Manly-Warringah	14–20	Canterbury-Bankstown	31 August 1974	Sydney Cricket Ground	Keith Page	23,600
Western Suburbs	24–8	South Sydney	1 September 1974	Sydney Sports Ground	Laurie Bruyeres	26,276
Semi-finals
Eastern Suburbs	17–19	Canterbury-Bankstown	7 September 1974	Sydney Cricket Ground	Keith Page	31,432
Manly-Warringah	20–23	Western Suburbs	8 September 1974	Sydney Cricket Ground	Laurie Bruyeres	40,050
Preliminary final
Eastern Suburbs	25–2	Western Suburbs	14 September 1974	Sydney Cricket Ground	Laurie Bruyeres	43,072
Grand final
Canterbury-Bankstown	4–19	Eastern Suburbs	21 September 1974	Sydney Cricket Ground	Laurie Bruyeres	57,214

=== Chart ===
Qualifying final
2	Manly	14
3	Canterbury	20
4	Western Suburbs	24
5	South Sydney	8

Major semi-final
1	Eastern Suburbs	17
Canterbury	19
Minor semi-final
Manly	20
Western Suburbs	23

Preliminary final
Eastern Suburbs	25
Western Suburbs	2

Grand final
Canterbury	4
Eastern Suburbs	19

=== Grand final ===
Canterbury-Bankstown	Position	Eastern Suburbs
1. Garry Dowling	FB	1. Russell Fairfax
2. Chris Anderson	WG	2. Jim Porter
3. Stan Cutler	CE	3. John Brass
4. Peter Winchester	CE	4. Mark Harris
5. Terry Murphy	WG	5. Bill Mullins
6. Mark Hughes	FE	6. John Peard
7. Don Moseley	HB	7. Johnny Mayes
13. Brian Lockwood	PR	13. Ken Jones
12. George Peponis	HK	12. Elwyn Walters
11. Bill Noonan	PR	10. Ian Mackay
10. Geoff Connell	SR	11. Arthur Beetson (c)
9. John McDonell (c)	SR	9. Barry "Bunny" Reilly
8. John Peek	LK	8. Ron Coote
18. Henry Tatana	Reserve	16. Harry Cameron
	Reserve	24. Greg Bandiera
Malcolm Clift	Coach	Jack Gibson

Eastern Suburbs 19 (Tries: Beetson, Harris, Mullins. Goals: Peard 3, Brass 2.)

defeated

Canterbury-Bankstown 4 (Goals: Cutler 2.)

== Player statistics ==
The following statistics are as of the conclusion of Round 22.

Top 5 point scorers

Points	Player	Tries	Goals	Field Goals
200	Graham Eadie	10	85	0
188	John Brass	7	83	1
136	Eric Simms	2	65	0
136	Reg Walton	4	62	0
135	John Dorahy	6	58	1

Top 5 try scorers

Tries	Player
21	Kevin Junee
19	Bill Mullins
14	Bob Fulton
14	Chris Anderson
14	Glenn West

Top 5 goal scorers

Goals	Player
85	Graham Eadie
83	John Brass
65	Eric Simms
62	Reg Walton
60	Henry Tatana
