= 1975 NSWRFL season =

Rugby league competition

1975 New South Wales Rugby Football League
- Teams: 12
- Premiers: Eastern Suburbs (11th title)
- Minor premiers: Eastern Suburbs (13th title)
- Matches played: 140
- Points scored: 4,444
- Attendance: 1,528,180
- Top points scorer(s): Graham Eadie (242)
- Wooden spoon: South Sydney; Rabbitohs (4th spoon)
- Rothmans Medal: Steve Rogers
- Top try-scorer(s): Johnny Mayes (16)

The 1975 New South Wales Rugby Football League premiership was the 68th season of Sydney's professional rugby league football competition, Australia's first. Twelve teams, including six of 1908's foundation clubs and another six from across Sydney competed for the J. J. Giltinan Shield during the season, which culminated in a grand final match for the WD & HO Wills Cup between the Eastern Suburbs and St. George clubs. NSWRFL teams also competed for the 1975 Amco Cup.

== Season summary ==
Each side faced each other twice in twenty-two regular season rounds from March to August, resulting in a top five of Eastern Suburbs, Manly-Warringah, St. George, Canterbury-Bankstown and Parramatta who battled it out for the premiership over six finals matches. With three sides finishing in equal fifth place, two elimination finals playoffs also had to be played.

Western Suburbs had 1 point deducted for fielding an ineligible player in round 8. After losing two consecutive matches in rounds 2 and 3, defending premiers Eastern Suburbs posted nineteen consecutive wins to close out the regular season; a streak than ran from round 4 to round 22 and remained the record for the most consecutive wins in premiership history until Melbourne Storm equalled the record in 2021; Round 3 to Round 23, although they were later eliminated by eventual Premiers Penrith Panthers in the preliminary final.

The 1975 season's Rothmans Medallist was Cronulla-Sutherland centre Steve Rogers. Rugby League Week gave their player of the year award to Manly-Warringah back Bob Fulton.

=== Teams ===
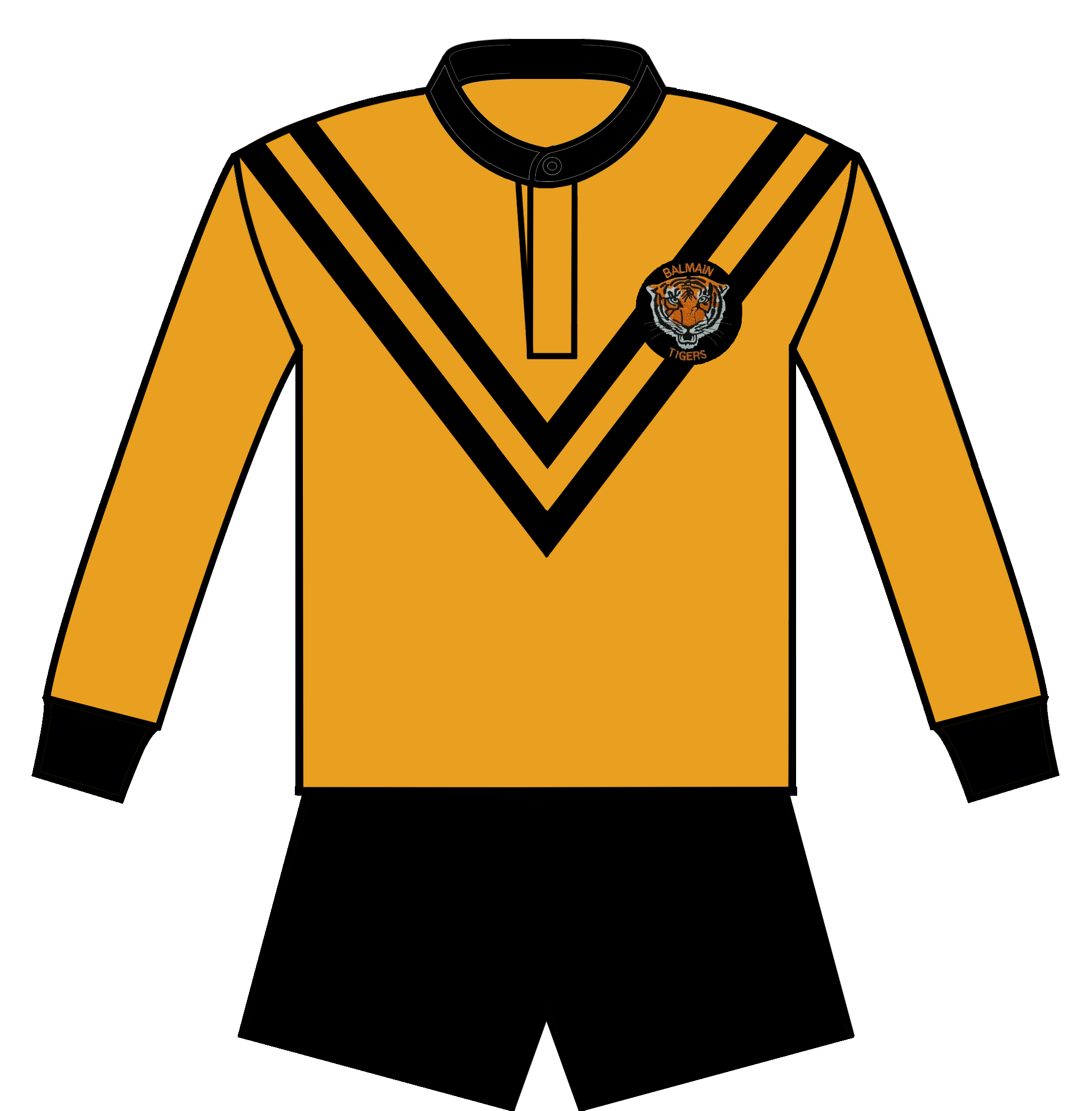
Balmain; Tigers 68th season Ground: Leichhardt Oval; Coach: Paul Broughton; Captain: Brian Lockwood, Keith Outten

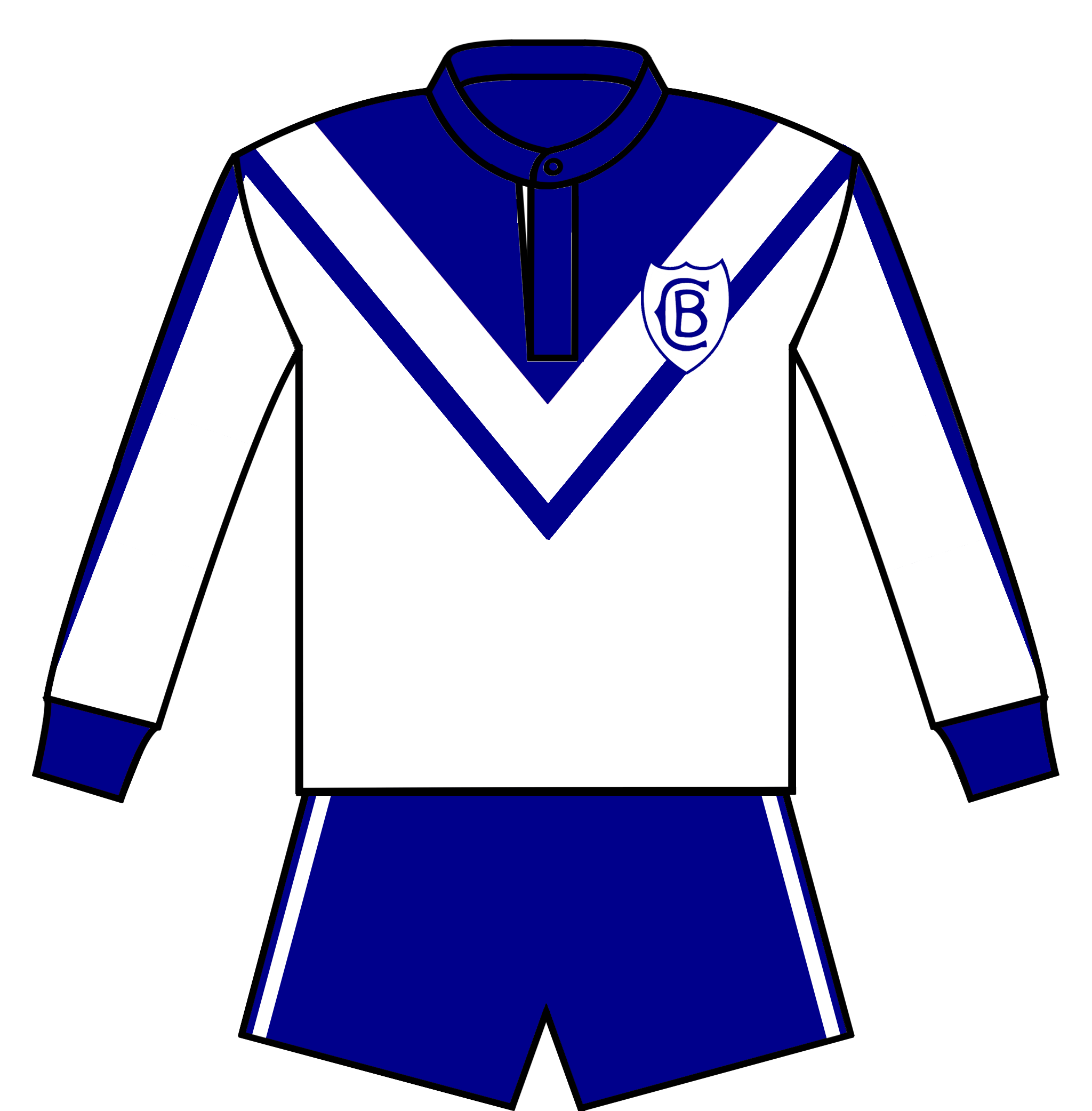
Canterbury-Bankstown 45th season Ground: Belmore Sports Ground; Coach: Malcolm Clift; Captain(s): Tim Pickup, John Peek, Barry Phillis

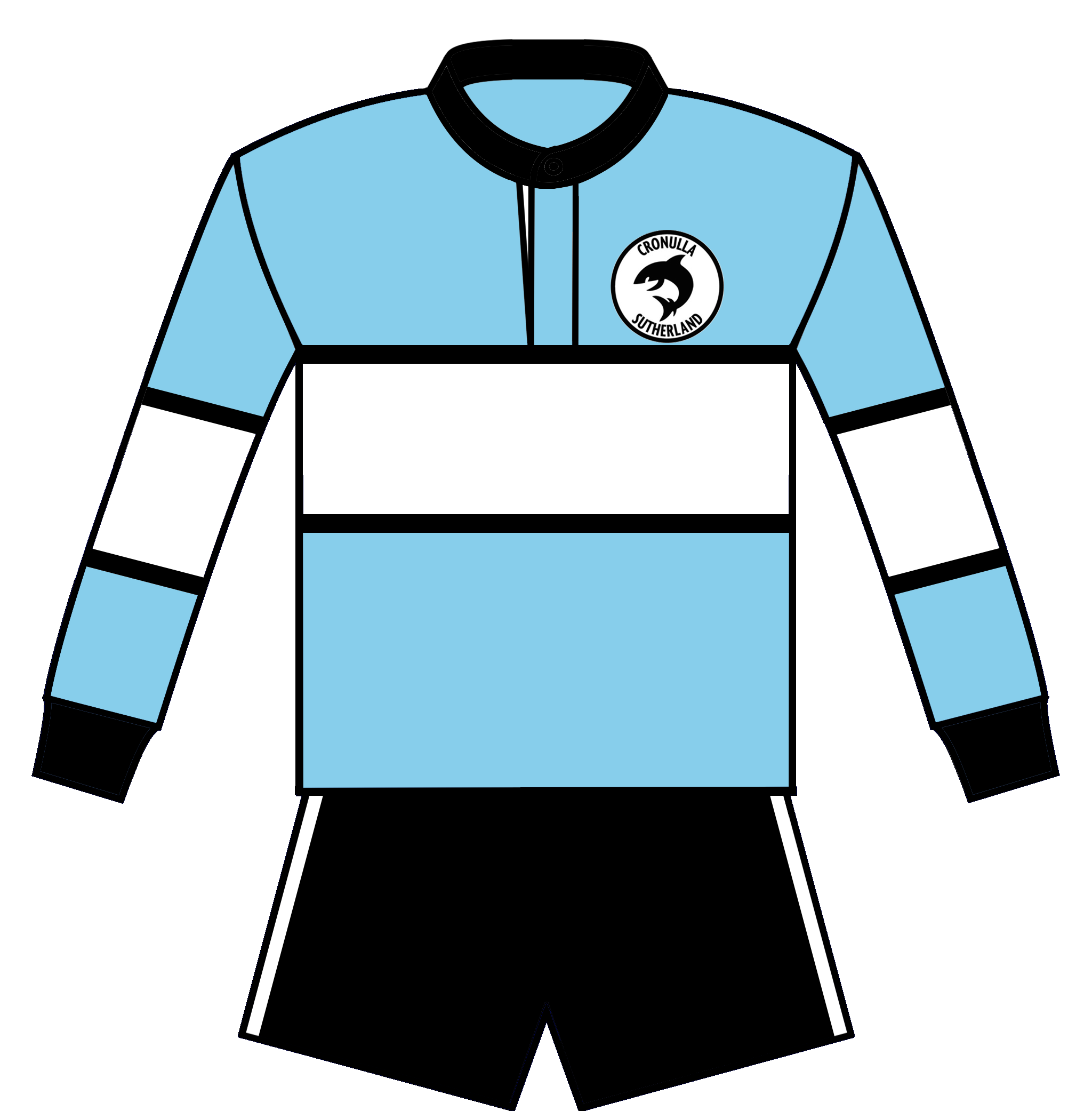
Cronulla-Sutherland; Sharks 9th season Ground: Endeavour Field; Coach: Johnny Raper; Captain: Greg Pierce

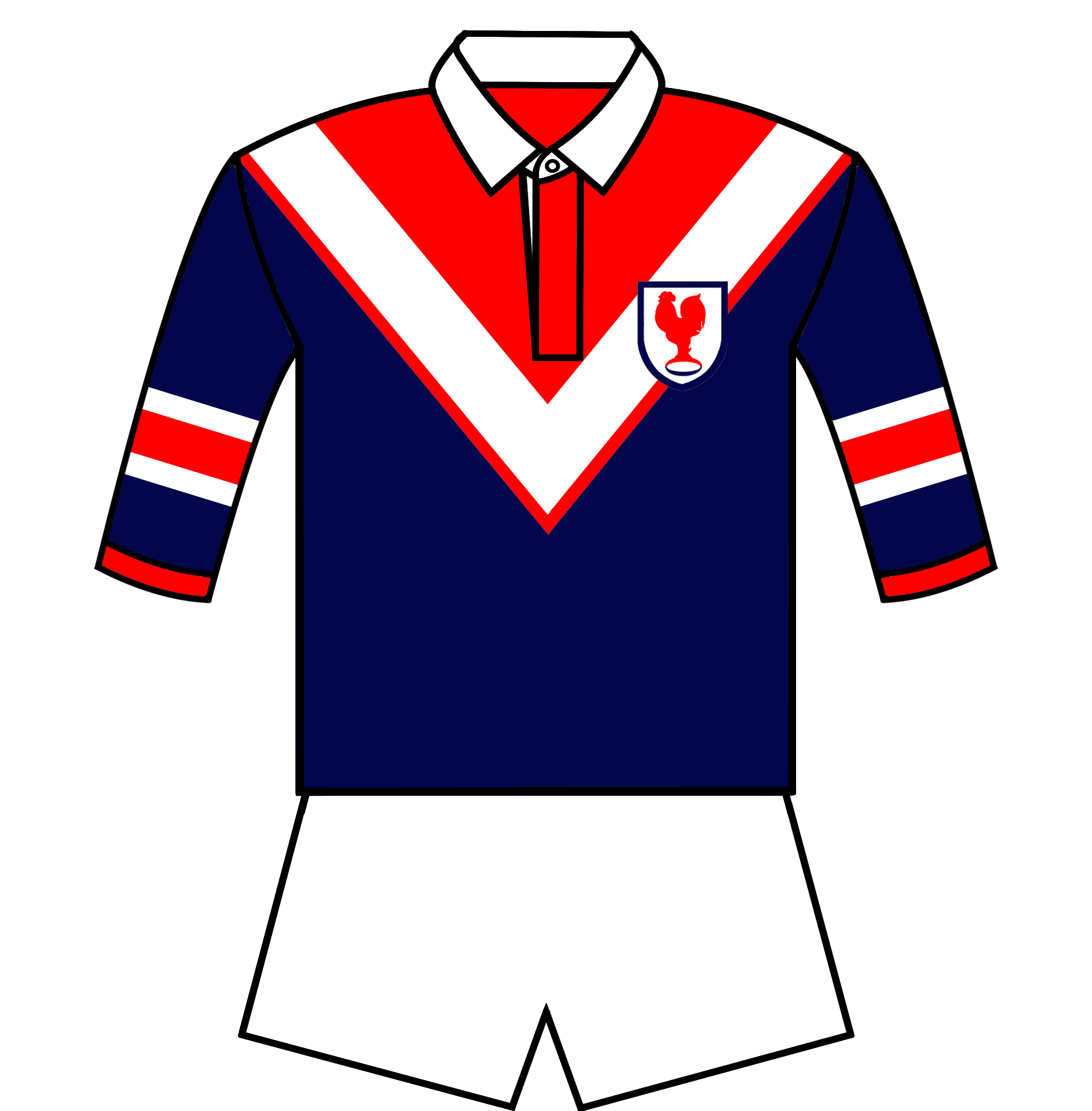
Eastern Suburbs; Roosters 68th season Ground: Sydney Sports Ground; Coach: Jack Gibson; Captain: Arthur Beetson

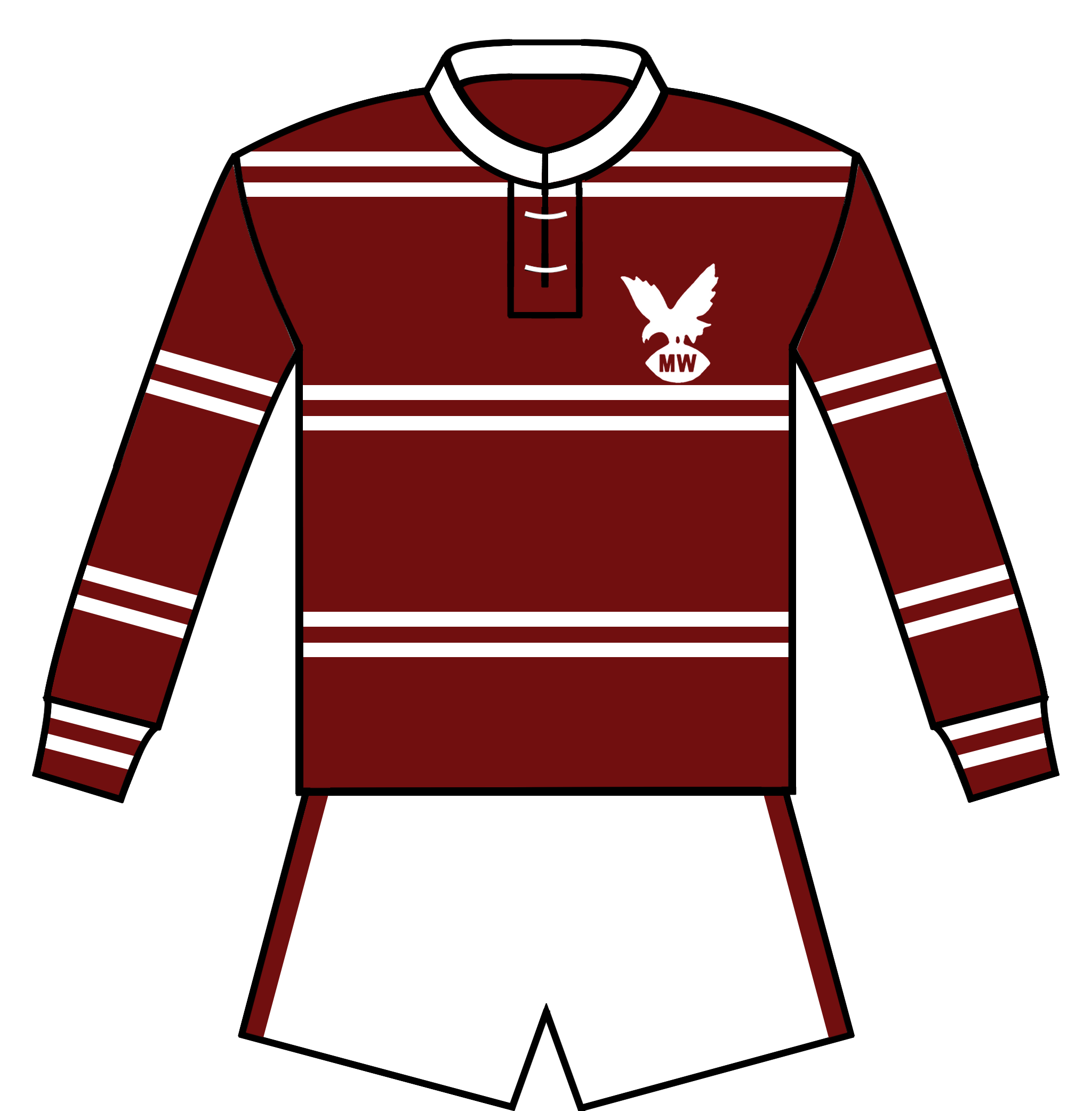
Manly-Warringah; Sea Eagles 29th season Ground: Brookvale Oval; Coach: Frank Stanton; Captain(s): Bob Fulton / Mal Reilly

Newtown; Jets 68th season Ground: Henson Park; Coach: Clarrie Jeffries; Captain: Barry Cox

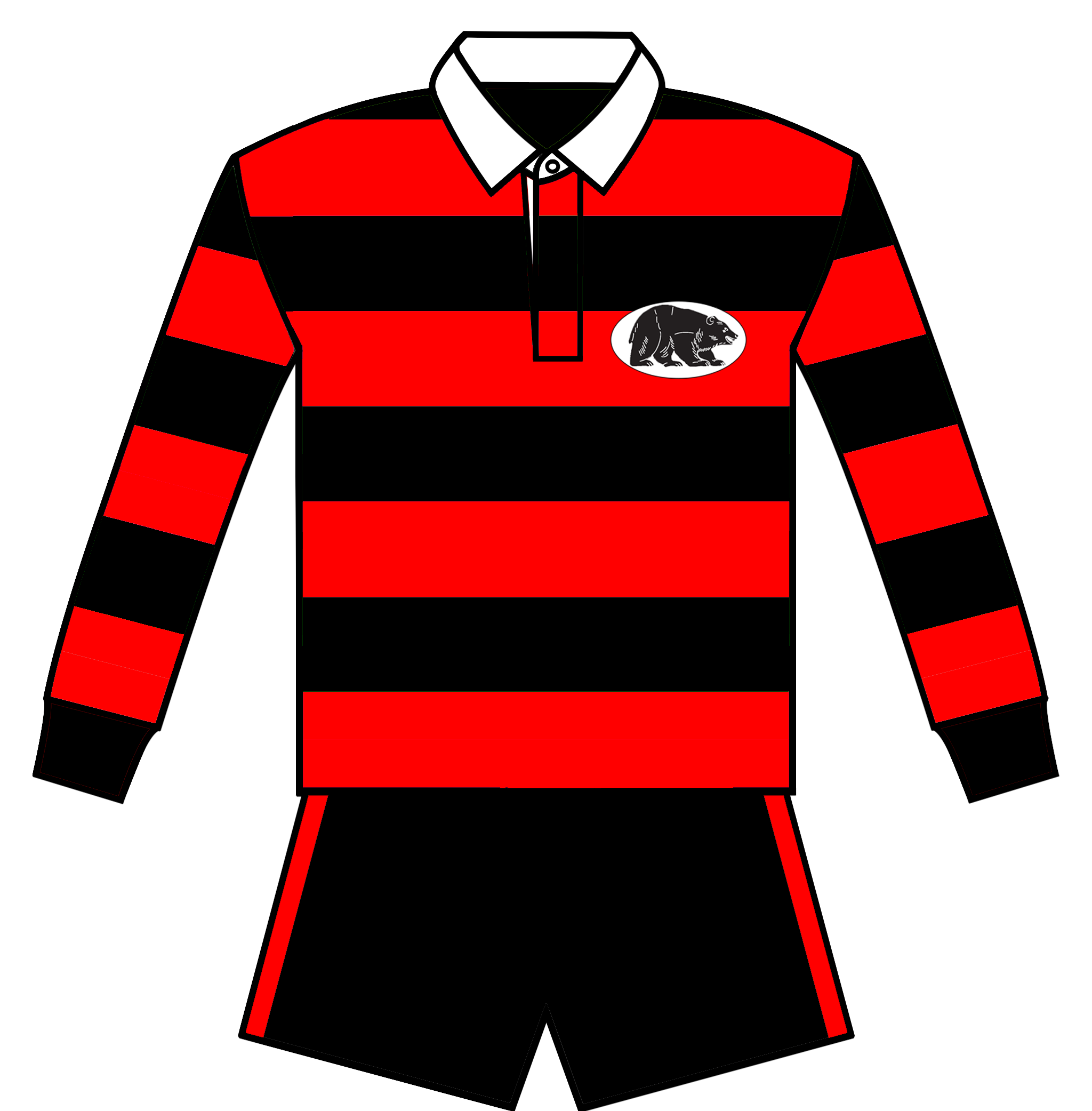
North Sydney; Bears 68th season Ground: North Sydney Oval; Coach: Noel Kelly; Captain: Bruce Walker

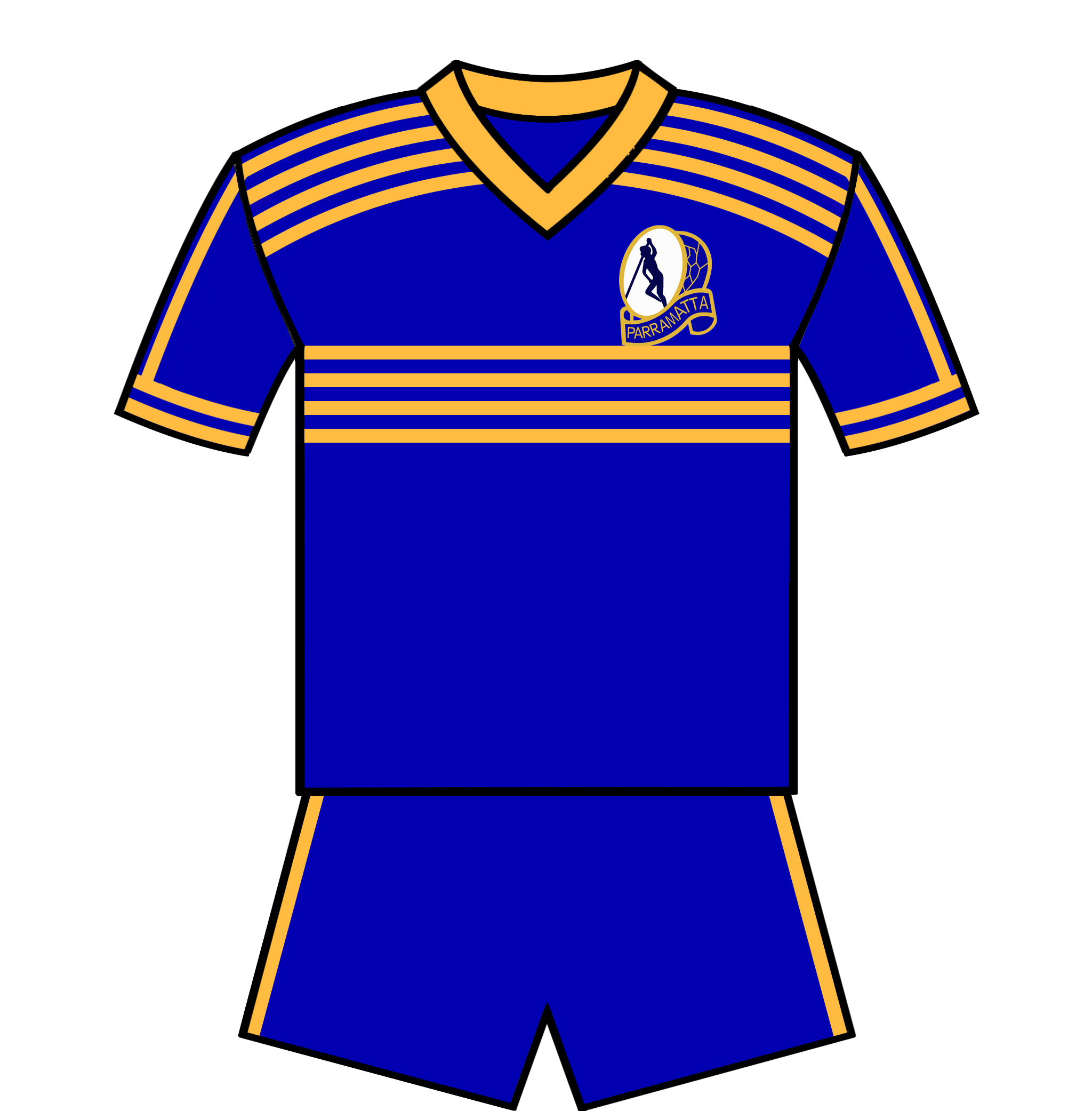
Parramatta; Eels 29th season Ground: Cumberland Oval; Coach: Norm Provan; Captain(s): John Baker,→ Denis Fitzgerald

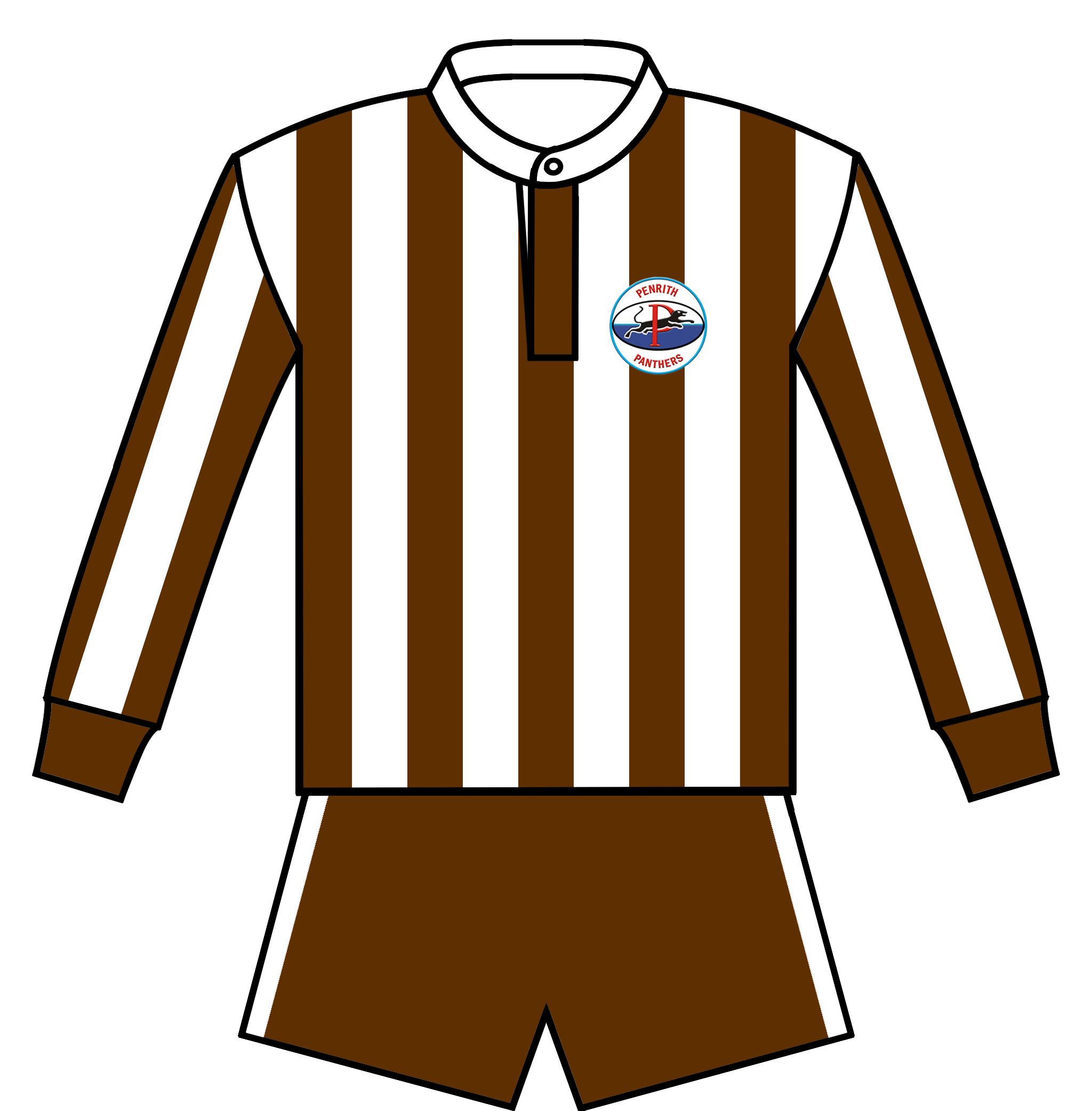
Penrith; Panthers 9th season Ground: Penrith Football Stadium; Coach: Barry Harris & Mike Stephenson; Captain: Zac Olejarnik

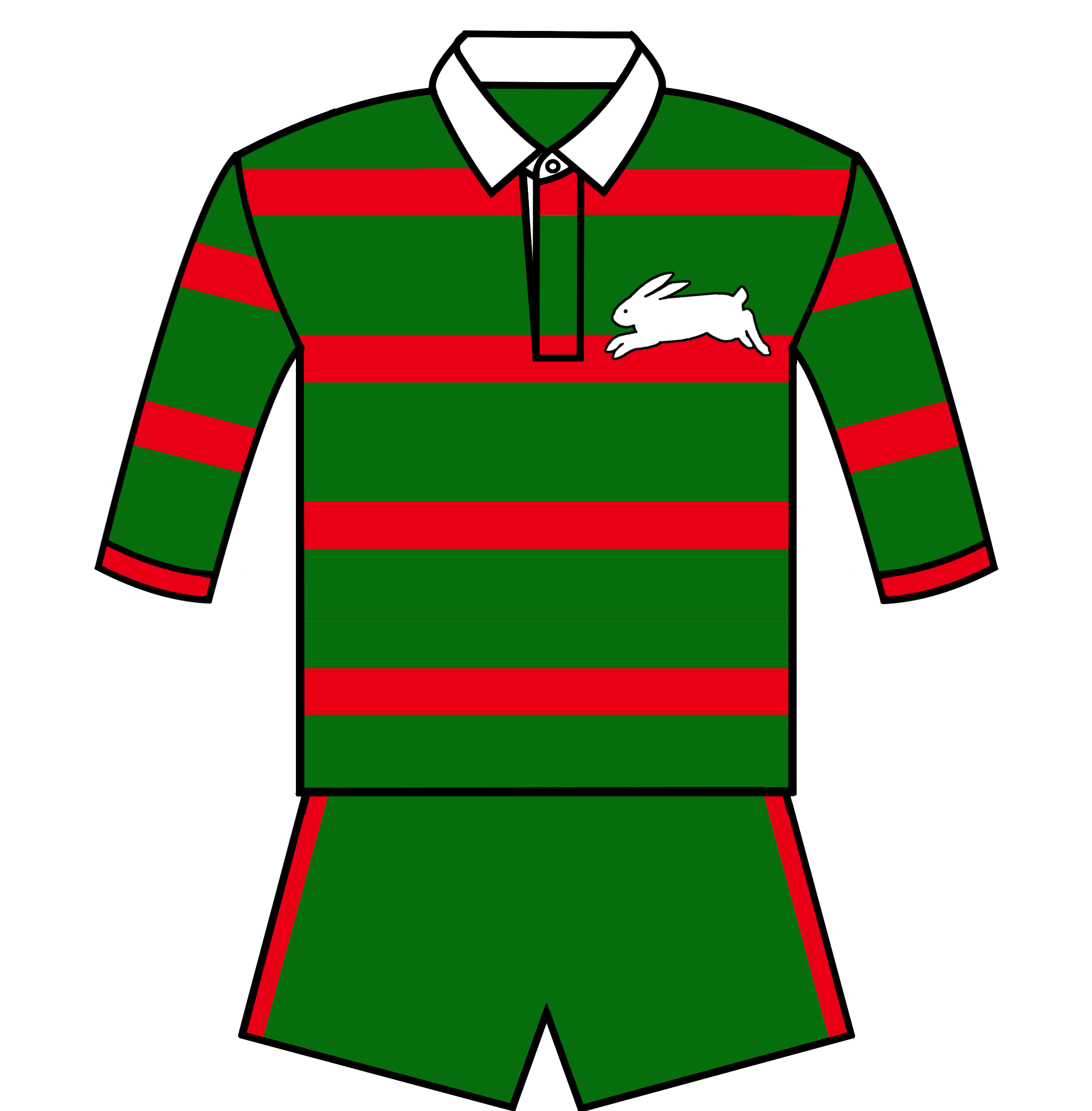
South Sydney; Rabbitohs 68th season Ground: Redfern Oval; Coach(s): Clive Churchill / Bob McCarthy; Captain: Bob McCarthy

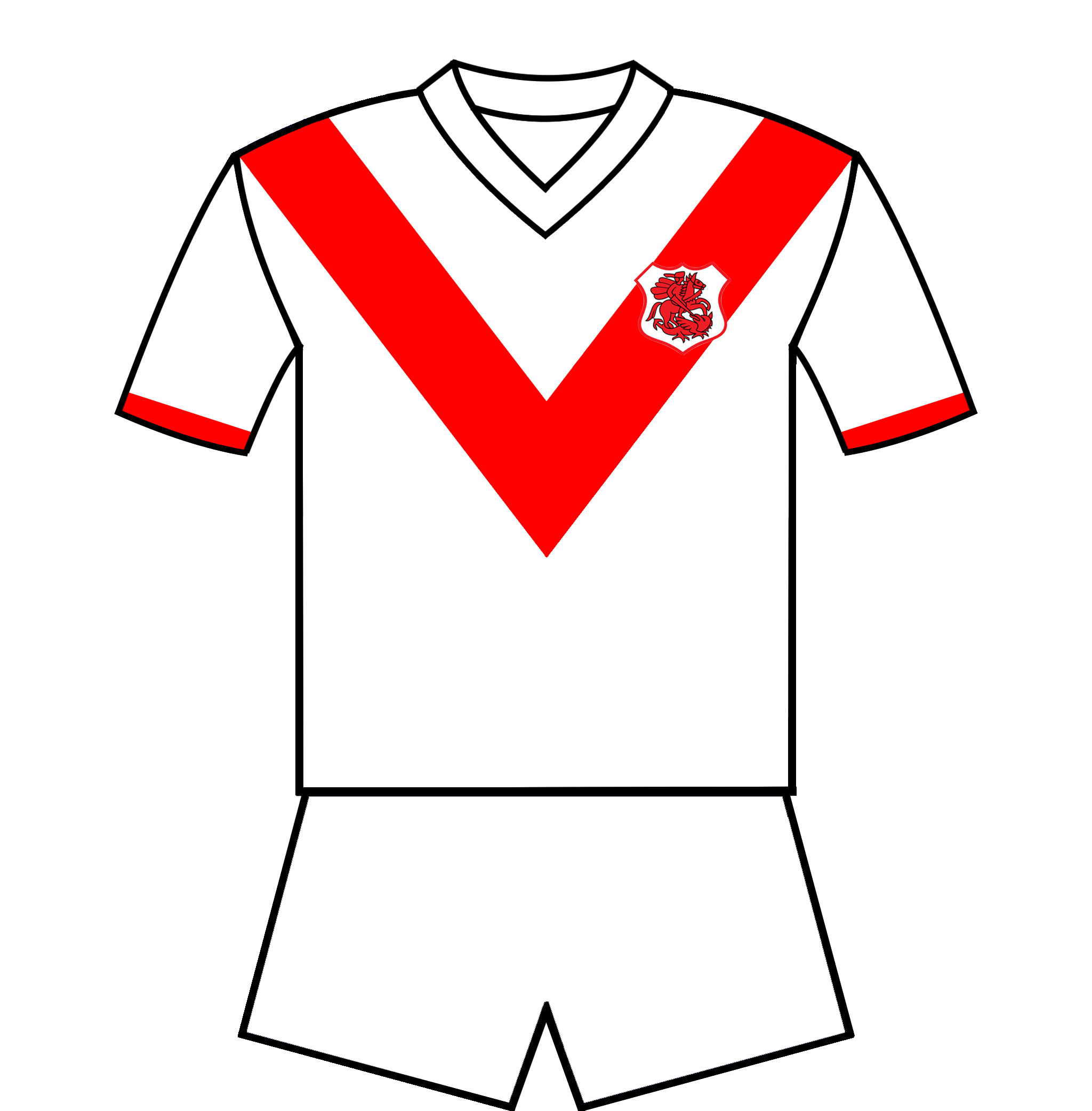
St. George; Dragons 55th season Ground: Kogarah Oval; Captain-coach: Graeme Langlands

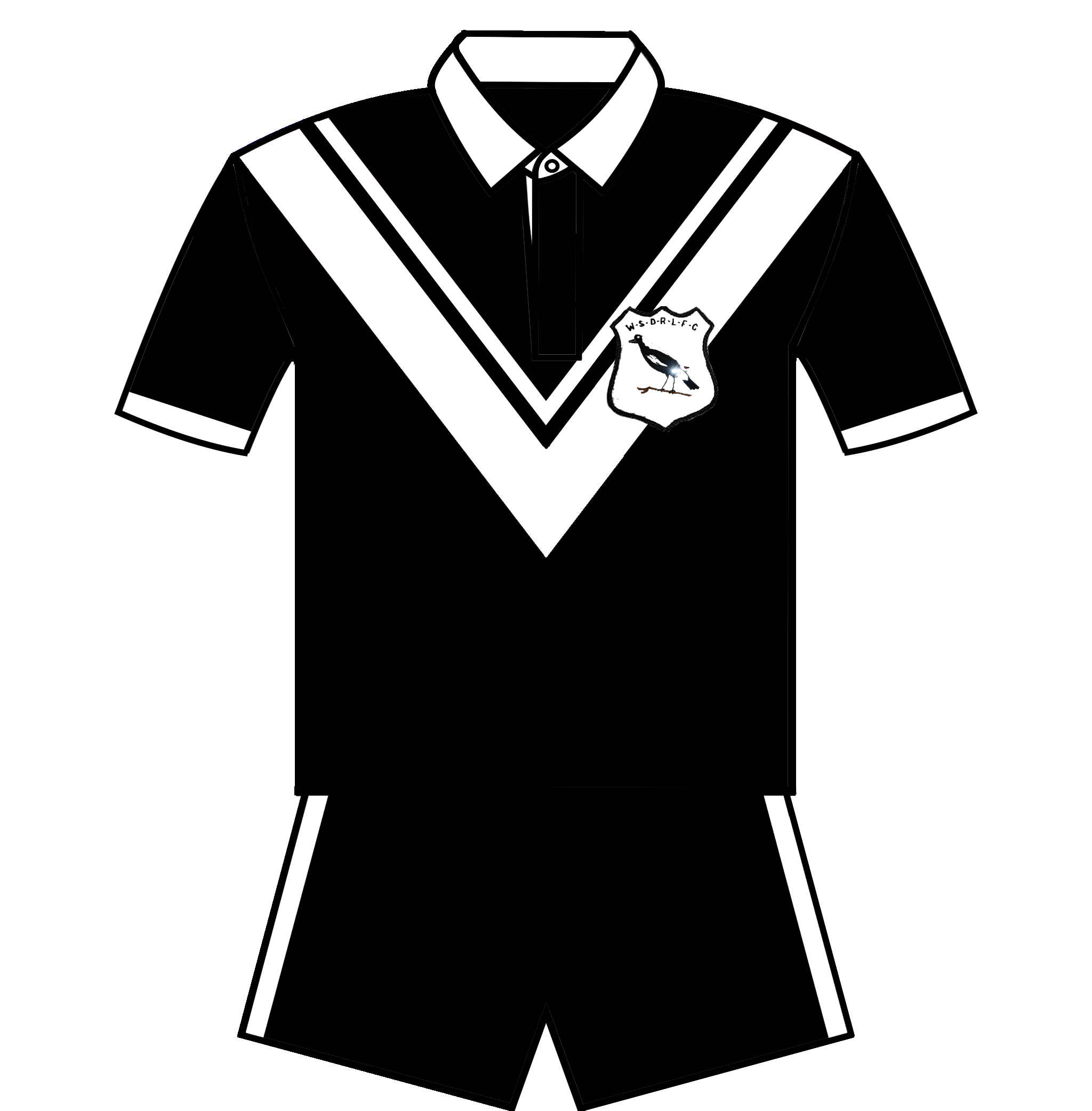
Western Suburbs; Magpies 68th season Ground: Lidcombe Oval; Coach: Don Parish; Captain: Tom Raudonikis

== Regular season ==
Team	1	2	3	4	5	6	7	8	9	10	11	12	13	14	15	16	17	18	19	20	21	22	F1	F2	F3	F4	F5	GF
Balmain Tigers	EAS −3	**PAR** **+3**	NOR −7	NEW −10	SOU −37	**STG** **−26**	**CRO** **+2**	MAN −13	WES −16	PEN +15	**CBY** **+5**	STG +3	**EAS** **−2**	**NOR** **+13**	**NEW** **+2**	**SOU** **+15**	PAR −21	CRO −1	**MAN** **+3**	**WES**; **0**	**PEN** **+7**	CBY −1	X	**PAR** **−11**				
Canterbury-Bankstown	**STG** **+4**	**CRO** **−11**	MAN −12	WES +1	**PEN** **+22**	**SOU** **+13**	EAS −19	**PAR** **+5**	NOR +44	**NEW**; **0**	BAL −5	SOU +3	STG +1	**MAN** **+18**	**WES**; **0**	PEN −15	CRO −8	**EAS** **−22**	PAR −1	**NOR** **−1**	NEW +25	**BAL** **+1**	X	X	**PAR** **−1**			
Cronulla-Sutherland Sharks	**PEN** **−2**	CBY +11	EAS +4	PAR −7	**NOR** **+4**	**NEW** **+2**	BAL −2	**STG**; **0**	**SOU** **+30**	MAN −6	WES −6	NEW −9	PEN −25	**EAS** **−2**	**PAR** **+14**	NOR +13	**CBY** **+8**	**BAL** **+1**	STG −3	SOU −6	**MAN** **−10**	**WES** **−14**						
Eastern Suburbs Roosters	**BAL** **+3**	STG −8	**CRO** **−4**	MAN +6	**WES** **+6**	PEN +13	**CBY** **+19**	SOU +3	PAR +5	**NOR** **+14**	NEW +9	**PEN** **+17**	BAL +2	CRO +2	**MAN** **+1**	WES +1	**STG** **+34**	CBY +22	**SOU** **+19**	**PAR** **+19**	NOR +23	**NEW** **+27**	X	X	X	**STG** **−3**	**MAN** **+15**	**STG** **+38**
Manly Warringah Sea Eagles	**WES** **+2**	PEN +19	**CBY** **+12**	**EAS** **−6**	PAR −15	NOR +8	NEW +13	**BAL** **+13**	**STG** **+1**	**CRO** **+6**	SOU +4	**NOR** **+6**	WES −18	CBY −18	EAS −1	**PAR** **+19**	**PEN** **+17**	**NEW** **+5**	BAL −3	STG −3	CRO +10	**SOU** **+54**	X	X	**STG** **−7**	**PAR** **+10**	EAS −15	
Newtown Jets	PAR −9	**NOR** **−8**	**SOU** **−7**	**BAL** **+10**	**STG** **−17**	CRO −2	**MAN** **−13**	WES +11	**PEN** **+14**	CBY; 0	**EAS** **−9**	**CRO** **+9**	**PAR** **+11**	SOU +6	BAL −2	STG −6	NOR −7	MAN −5	**WES** **+3**	PEN; 0	**CBY** **−25**	EAS −27						
North Sydney Bears	SOU −4	NEW +8	**BAL** **+7**	STG −3	CRO −4	**MAN** **−8**	**WES** **−13**	PEN +25	**CBY** **−44**	EAS −14	PAR −12	MAN −6	**SOU** **+2**	BAL −13	**STG** **+6**	**CRO** **−13**	**NEW** **+7**	WES +3	**PEN** **+21**	CBY +1	**EAS** **−23**	**PAR** **−15**						
Parramatta Eels	**NEW** **+9**	BAL −3	STG −10	**CRO** **+7**	**MAN** **+15**	WES −17	**PEN** **+5**	CBY −5	**EAS** **−5**	SOU −7	**NOR** **+12**	**WES** **−4**	NEW −11	**STG**; **0**	CRO −14	MAN −19	**BAL** **+21**	PEN +15	**CBY** **+1**	EAS −19	**SOU** **+32**	NOR +15	WES +5	BAL +11	CBY +1	MAN −10		
Penrith Panthers	CRO +2	**MAN** **−19**	**WES** **+9**	SOU −5	CBY −22	**EAS** **−13**	PAR −5	**NOR** **−25**	NEW −14	**BAL** **−15**	STG −9	EAS −17	**CRO** **+25**	WES +5	**SOU** **+2**	**CBY** **+15**	MAN −17	**PAR** **−15**	NOR −21	**NEW**; **0**	BAL −7	**STG** **+6**						
South Sydney Rabbitohs	**NOR** **+4**	WES −11	NEW +7	**PEN** **+5**	**BAL** **+37**	CBY −13	STG −7	**EAS** **−3**	CRO −30	**PAR** **+7**	**MAN** **−4**	**CBY** **−3**	NOR −2	**NEW** **−6**	PEN −2	BAL −15	**WES** **−11**	**STG** **−17**	EAS −19	**CRO** **+6**	PAR −32	MAN −54						
St. George Dragons	CBY −4	**EAS** **+8**	**PAR** **+10**	**NOR** **+3**	NEW +17	BAL +26	**SOU** **+7**	CRO; 0	MAN −1	**WES** **+7**	**PEN** **+9**	**BAL** **−3**	**CBY** **−1**	PAR; 0	NOR −6	**NEW** **+6**	EAS −34	SOU +17	**CRO** **+3**	**MAN** **+3**	WES −14	PEN −6	X	X	MAN +7	EAS +3	X	EAS −38
Western Suburbs Magpies	MAN −2	**SOU** **+11**	PEN −9	**CBY** **−1**	EAS −6	**PAR** **+17**	NOR +13	**NEW** **−11**	**BAL** **+16**	STG −7	**CRO** **+6**	PAR +4	**MAN** **+18**	**PEN** **−5**	CBY; 0	**EAS** **−1**	SOU +11	**NOR** **−3**	NEW −3	BAL; 0	**STG** **+14**	CRO +14	**PAR** **−5**					
Team	1	2	3	4	5	6	7	8	9	10	11	12	13	14	15	16	17	18	19	20	21	22	F1	F2	F3	F4	F5	GF

Bold – Home game
X – Bye
Opponent for round listed above margin

=== Ladder ===
	Team	Pld	W	D	L	PF	PA	PD	Pts
1	Eastern Suburbs	22	20	0	2	431	198	+233	40
2	Manly	22	15	0	7	439	314	+125	30
3	St. George	22	12	2	8	341	294	+47	26
4	Canterbury	22	11	2	9	330	287	+43	24
5	Western Suburbs	22	10	2	10	365	289	+76	21
6	Parramatta	22	10	1	11	391	373	+18	21
7	Balmain	22	10	1	11	288	357	-69	21
8	Cronulla	22	9	1	12	370	375	-5	19
9	North Sydney	22	9	0	13	322	414	-92	18
10	Newtown	22	7	2	13	349	422	-73	16
11	Penrith	22	7	1	14	312	452	-140	15
12	South Sydney	22	6	0	16	298	461	-163	12

- Western Suburbs were stripped of 1 competition point due to an illegal replacement in one game.

=== Ladder progression ===
- Numbers highlighted in green indicate that the team finished the round inside the top 5.
- Numbers highlighted in blue indicates the team finished first on the ladder in that round.
- Numbers highlighted in red indicates the team finished last place on the ladder in that round.

	Team	1	2	3	4	5	6	7	8	9	10	11	12	13	14	15	16	17	18	19	20	21	22
1	Eastern Suburbs Roosters	2	2	2	4	6	8	10	12	14	16	18	20	22	24	26	28	30	32	34	36	38	40
2	Manly Warringah Sea Eagles	2	4	6	6	6	8	10	12	14	16	18	20	20	20	20	22	24	26	26	26	28	30
3	St. George Dragons	0	2	4	6	8	10	12	13	13	15	17	17	17	18	18	20	20	22	24	26	26	26
4	Canterbury-Bankstown	2	2	2	4	6	8	8	10	12	13	13	15	17	19	20	20	20	20	20	20	22	24
5	Western Suburbs Magpies	0	2	2	2	2	4	6	6	8	8	10	12	14	14	15	14	16	16	16	17	19	21
6	Parramatta Eels	2	2	2	4	6	6	8	8	8	8	10	10	10	11	11	11	13	15	17	17	19	21
7	Balmain Tigers	0	2	2	2	2	2	4	4	4	6	8	10	10	12	14	16	16	16	18	19	21	21
8	Cronulla-Sutherland Sharks	0	2	4	4	6	8	8	9	11	11	11	11	11	11	13	15	17	19	19	19	19	19
9	North Sydney Bears	0	2	4	4	4	4	4	6	6	6	6	6	8	8	10	10	12	14	16	18	18	18
10	Newtown Jets	0	0	0	2	2	2	2	4	6	7	7	9	11	13	13	13	13	13	15	16	16	16
11	Penrith Panthers	2	2	4	4	4	4	4	4	4	4	4	4	6	8	10	12	12	12	12	13	13	15
12	South Sydney Rabbitohs	2	2	4	6	8	8	8	8	8	10	10	10	10	10	10	10	10	10	10	12	12	12

== Finals ==
Balmain, Parramatta and Western Suburbs tied for fifth place, necessitating a play-off drawn from a hat.

Home	Score	Away	Match Information
Home	Score	Away	Date and Time	Venue	Referee	Crowd
Playoffs
Western Suburbs	13–18	Parramatta	26 August 1975	Sydney Cricket Ground	Greg Hartley	9,920
Parramatta	19–8	Balmain	28 August 1975	Sydney Cricket Ground	Gary Cook	19,914
Qualifying Finals
Manly-Warringah	3–10	St. George	30 August 1975	Sydney Cricket Ground	Laurie Bruyeres	23,492
Canterbury-Bankstown	5–6	Parramatta	31 August 1975	Sydney Cricket Ground	Gary Cook	19,312
Semi-finals
Eastern Suburbs	5–8	St. George	6 September 1975	Sydney Cricket Ground	Laurie Bruyeres	28,851
Manly-Warringah	22–12	Parramatta	7 September 1975	Sydney Cricket Ground	Gary Cook	26,109
Preliminary final
Eastern Suburbs	28–13	Manly-Warringah	13 September 1975	Sydney Cricket Ground	Laurie Bruyeres	31,645
Grand final
St. George	0–38	Eastern Suburbs	20 September 1975	Sydney Cricket Ground	Laurie Bruyeres	63,047

=== Chart ===
Qualifying final
2	Manly	3
3	St. George	10
4	Canterbury	5
5	Parramatta	6

Major semi-final
1	Eastern Suburbs	5
St. George	8
Minor semi-final
Manly	22
Parramatta	12

Preliminary final
Eastern Suburbs	28
Manly	13

Grand final
St. George	0
Eastern Suburbs	38

=== Grand final ===
St. George	Position	Eastern Suburbs
1. Graeme Langlands (Ca./Co)	FB	1. Ian Schubert
2. Paul Mills	WG	2. Bruce Pickett
3. Roy Ferguson	CE	3. John Brass
4. Ted Goodwin	CE	4. John Rheinberger
5. John Chapman	WG	5. Bill Mullins
6. John Bailey	FE	6. John Peard
7. Billy Smith	HB	7. Johnny Mayes
13. Barry Beath	PR	13. Ian Mackay
12. Steve Edge	HK	12. Elwyn Walters
11. Henry Tatana	PR	18. Grant Hedger
10. Peter Fitzgerald	SR	11. Arthur Beetson (c)
9. Robert Stone	SR	10. Ron Coote
8. Lindsay Drake	LK	8. Kevin Stevens
14. Robert Finch	Reserve	9. Barry Reilly
15. Bruce Starkey	Reserve	19. Des O'Reilly
	Coach	Jack Gibson

This was the first grand final to be telecast in colour. The star-studded Eastern Suburbs line up had lost only 2 matches in the 22-game regular season and were clear starting favourites. However, St. George looked a chance early on when utility back "Lord Ted" Goodwin put on a chip and chase. Goodwin collided with Eastern Suburbs' fullback Ian Schubert, came off second best and was out of touch for the remainder of the match. Things were also wrong with captain-coach Graeme Langlands who was struggling with his coordination following an ill-directed pain killing injection that numbed his right leg and severely affected his form.

At half-time, Eastern Suburbs were up 5–0. Just after the break the Roosters' prop Ian McKay crashed over from close range and the floodgates opened. Eastern Suburbs unleashed a torrent of tries with Johnny Mayes, Arthur Beetson, John Brass, Bruce Pickett and boom recruit Schubert all scoring.

Despite his numbed leg, Langlands returned in the second half hoping it would come good. It didn't and he was replaced. By the end of the game, St. George had been completely demoralised by Easts in a 38–0 record Grand final defeat. Fellow Immortal and peer Australian Captain Arthur Beetson attempted in vain to console the forlorn Langlands at match end.

Easts' eight tries in the grand final matched South Sydney's record achievement in the 1951 final (subsequently equalled again by Manly in 2008).

20 September 1975

Eastern Suburbs Roosters	38 – 0	St. George Dragons
Tries: Johnny Mayes 2 John Brass 2 Ian Mackay 1 Arthur Beetson 1 Bruce Pickett 1 Ian Schubert 1 Goals: John Peard 7/8; John Brass 0/1; Field Goals: John Brass 0/1	1st: 5 - 0; 2nd: 33 - 0 Report	Goals: Henry Tatana 0/1

Sydney Cricket Ground
Attendance: 63,047
Referee: Laurie Bruyeres
Player of the Match: Ian Schubert (Note: Awarded retrospectively in 2008.)

== Player statistics ==
The following statistics are as of the conclusion of Round 22.

Top 5 point scorers

Points	Player	Tries	Goals	Field Goals
223	Graham Eadie	13	92	0
183	John Brass	4	85	1
183	John Dorahy	11	75	0
156	Steve Rogers	8	66	0
153	Eric Simms	5	68	2

Top 5 try scorers

Tries	Player
14	Johnny Mayes
14	Mark Harris
13	Bob Fulton
13	Graham Eadie
12	Jim Porter

Top 5 goal scorers

Goals	Player
92	Graham Eadie
85	John Brass
75	John Dorahy
68	Eric Simms
66	Steve Rogers
