= 1976 Eastern Suburbs Roosters season =

← 1975	1977 →

The 1976 Eastern Suburbs season was the 69th in the club's history. They competed in the NSWRFL's 1976 Premiership, finishing the regular season 5th (out of 12) to reach the play-offs. They were then knocked out in their first finals match by Canterbury-Bnakstown. Easts also competed in the 1976 Amco Cup.

This season Eastern Suburbs became the first rugby league team, and one of the first in Australian sport, to sport a sponsor's name on their jersey.

== Ladder ==
	Team	Pld	W	D	L	PF	PA	PD	Pts
1	Manly-Warringah	22	16	0	6	499	252	+247	32
2	Parramatta	22	14	2	6	347	238	+109	30
3	St. George	22	14	0	8	328	298	+30	28
4	Eastern Suburbs	22	13	1	8	399	250	+149	27
5	Canterbury-Bankstown	22	12	3	7	361	337	+24	27
6	Balmain	22	12	1	9	318	287	+31	25
7	Western Suburbs	22	11	2	9	379	313	+66	24
8	Cronulla-Sutherland	22	9	1	12	378	393	-15	19
9	Penrith	22	8	1	13	352	333	+19	17
10	South Sydney	22	8	0	14	297	421	-124	16
11	North Sydney	22	6	1	15	272	526	-254	13
12	Newtown	22	3	0	19	264	546	-282	6

== World Club Challenge ==
Rugby league's inaugural World Club Challenge was contested between Australia's, Eastern Suburbs Roosters and England's St Helens R.F.C., it was played at the Sydney Cricket Ground on 29 June 1976.

Eastern Suburbs 25( Fairfax, Stevens, Ayliffe, Schubert, Townshend Tries; Brass 5 Goals) defeated St Helens RFC 2(G.Pimblett Goal) played at the Sydney Cricket Ground.

The lineups were: Eastern Suburbs • Coach:Jack Gibson • Russell Fairfax • Ian Schubert • Mark Harris • John Brass • Bill Mullins • Trevor Barnes • Kevin Stevens • Barry Reilly • Arthur Beetson(c) • Ian Mackay • Royce Ayliffe • Elwyn Walters • Kel Jones : • Robert Laurie • John Mayes • Grant Hedger • G.Townsend.

St Helens FC • Geoff Pimblett • L.Jones • E.Cunningham • D.Noonan • R.Mathias • W.Benyon • K. Gwilliam • D.Hull • George Nicholls • E. Chisnall • K.Coslett(c) • A.Karalius • J.Mantle:• P.Glynn, F.Wilson • J. Heaton • M. James.

Preceded by 1975	Season; 1976	Succeeded by 1977
