= 1974 Cronulla-Sutherland Sharks season =

- NSWRFL rank: 10th
- 1974 record: Wins: 9; draws: 0; losses: 13
- Points scored: For: 314 (64 tries, 61 goals); against: 437 (93 tries, 79 goals)

Team information
- Coach: Noel Thornton
- Captain: Greg Pierce Ken Maddison John Maguire
- Stadium: Endeavour Field
- Avg. attendance: 6,894

Top scorers
- Tries: Ray Corcoran (10)
- Goals: Steve Rogers (23)
- Points: Steve Rogers (52)
← 1973	1975 →

The 1974 Cronulla-Sutherland Sharks season was the eighth in the club's history. They competed in the NSWRFL's 1974 Premiership as well as the 1974 Amco Cup.

== Ladder ==
	Team	Pld	W	D	L	PF	PA	PD	Pts
1	Eastern Suburbs	22	19	0	3	513	198	+315	38
2	Manly-Warringah	22	15	0	7	526	316	+210	30
3	Canterbury-Bankstown	22	13	0	9	364	308	+56	26
4	Western Suburbs	22	12	1	9	402	305	+97	25
5	South Sydney	22	12	1	9	317	327	-10	25
6	North Sydney	22	11	2	9	297	272	+25	24
7	Newtown Jets	22	9	2	11	278	261	+17	20
8	St. George	22	10	0	12	331	363	-32	20
9	Penrith	22	9	0	13	353	465	-112	18
10	Cronulla-Sutherland	22	9	0	13	314	437	-123	18
11	Parramatta	22	5	0	17	237	454	-217	10
12	Balmain	22	4	2	16	255	481	-226	10
