= Paul Mills (disambiguation) =

Paul Mills (born 1972) is an American basketball coach.

Paul Mills may also refer to:

- Paul Mills (figure skater), Canadian former pair skater
- Paul Mills (rugby league), Australian rugby league player
