= 1975 Cronulla-Sutherland Sharks season =

- NSWRFL rank: 8th
- 1975 record: Wins: 9; draws: 1; losses: 12
- Points scored: For: 370 (68 tries, 83 goals); against: 375 (68 tries, 85 goals, 1 field goal)

Team information
- Coach: Johnny Raper
- Captain: Greg Pierce John Maguire
- Stadium: Endeavour Field
- Avg. attendance: 9,213

Top scorers
- Tries: Dave Chamberlin (9)
- Goals: Steve Rogers (66)
- Points: Steve Rogers (156)
← 1974	1976 →

The 1975 Cronulla-Sutherland Sharks season was the ninth in the club's history. They competed in the NSWRFL's 1975 Premiership as well as the 1975 Amco Cup.

== Ladder ==
	Team	Pld	W	D	L	PF	PA	PD	Pts
1	Eastern Suburbs	22	20	0	2	431	198	+233	40
2	Manly-Warringah	22	15	0	7	439	314	+125	30
3	St. George	22	12	2	8	341	294	+47	26
4	Canterbury-Bankstown	22	11	2	9	330	287	+43	24
5	Western Suburbs	22	10	2	10	365	289	+76	21
6	Parramatta	22	10	1	11	391	373	+18	21
7	Balmain	22	10	1	11	288	357	-69	21
8	Cronulla-Sutherland	22	9	1	12	370	375	-5	19
9	North Sydney	22	9	0	13	322	414	-92	18
10	Newtown Jets	22	7	2	13	349	422	-73	16
11	Penrith	22	7	1	14	312	452	-140	15
12	South Sydney	22	6	0	16	298	461	-163	12

- Western Suburbs were stripped of one competition point due to an illegal replacement in one game.
