= 1976 Cronulla-Sutherland Sharks season =

- NSWRFL rank: 8th
- 1976 record: Wins: 9; draws: 1; losses: 12
- Points scored: For: 378 (80 tries, 69 goals); against: 393 (77 tries, 81 goals)

Team information
- Coach: Johnny Raper
- Captain: Greg Pierce Roger Millward
- Stadium: Endeavour Field
- Avg. attendance: 8,116

Top scorers
- Tries: Martin Raftery (14)
- Goals: Barry Andrews (27)
- Points: Steve Rogers (74)
← 1975	1977 →

The 1976 Cronulla-Sutherland Sharks season was the 10th in the club's history. They competed in the NSWRFL's 1976 Premiership as well as the 1976 Amco Cup.

== Ladder ==
	Team	Pld	W	D	L	PF	PA	PD	Pts
1	Manly-Warringah	22	16	0	6	499	252	+247	32
2	Parramatta	22	14	2	6	347	238	+109	30
3	St. George	22	14	0	8	328	298	+30	28
4	Eastern Suburbs	22	13	1	8	399	250	+149	27
5	Canterbury-Bankstown	22	12	3	7	361	337	+24	27
6	Balmain	22	12	1	9	318	287	+31	25
7	Western Suburbs	22	11	2	9	379	313	+66	24
8	Cronulla-Sutherland	22	9	1	12	378	393	-15	19
9	Penrith	22	8	1	13	352	333	+19	17
10	South Sydney	22	8	0	14	297	421	-124	16
11	North Sydney	22	6	1	15	272	526	-254	13
12	Newtown Jets	22	3	0	19	264	546	-282	6
