= Peter Winchester =

Australian rugby league footballer

Personal information
- Full name: Peter Winchester
- Born: 12 November 1949 (age 77) Camperdown, New South Wales, Australia

Playing information
- Position: Five-eighth, Centre
Club
Years	Team	Pld	T	G	FG	P
1973–76	Canterbury-Bankstown	43	4	0	0	12
- Source: As of 17 April 2019

Peter Winchester nicknamed "Chester" is an Australian former rugby league footballer who played in the 1970s. He played for Canterbury-Bankstown in the New South Wales Rugby League (NSWRL) competition.

== Background ==
Winchester played junior rugby league for Lewisham Old Boys.

== Playing career ==
Winchester made his first grade debut for Canterbury-Bankstown in Round 1 1973 against Manly-Warringah. Originally a five-eighth, Winchester moved to the centres in the 1974 season. Winchester played at centre for Canterbury against Eastern Suburbs in the 1974 NSWRL grand final, the clubs first since the 1967 grand final defeat by South Sydney.

Easts defeated Canterbury 19-4 at the Sydney Cricket Ground to win their first premiership since 1945. In 1975 and 1976, Winchester became a regular member of the reserve grade team and retired from playing before the start of the 1977 season. In total, Winchester played 101 games for the club across all grades.

== Post playing ==
Winchester later became a director of the club after the board at the time stood down due to the 2002 salary cap scandal which occurred where Canterbury were docked 37 competition points and fined $500,000 for exceeding the cap amount in 2000 and 2001.
