= Ray Strudwick =

Australian rugby league footballer

Personal information
- Born: 22 June 1949 (age 75); Darlinghurst, New South Wales, Australia

Playing information
- Position: Wing, Centre
Club
Years	Team	Pld	T	G	FG	P
1969–72	Canterbury-Bankstown	49	10	0	0	30
1973–74	Eastern Suburbs	9	3	0	0	9
1975	Parramatta	6	1	0	0	3
	Total	64	14	0	0	42
- Source: As of 17 March 2025

Ray Strudwick is an Australian former rugby league footballer who played in the 1960s and 1970s. He played for Canterbury-Bankstown, Eastern Suburbs and Parramatta in the New South Wales Rugby League (NSWRL) competition.

== Early life ==
Strudwick was born on 22 June 1949 at Darlinghurst. He attended Picnic Point High School and played junior rugby league with Bankstown Sports Club.

== Playing career ==
Strudwick made his first grade debut for Canterbury-Bankstown on 28 March 1969, winning 18–0 against Newtown. He was a regular first grade player for most of that season, scoring 10 tries. Strudwick was the Berries first grade player number 340.

In 1970, Strudwick began the year as a member of the team that won the preseason Wills Cup competition, defeating St. George 20–11 including a try by Strudwick. He went on to play every first grade game bar one during the season, scoring seven tries.

During 1971–72, Strudwick played mostly reserve grade. His team won the Reserve Grade Premiership in both years. He played only 14 first grade games in that period. In 1972, despite playing only six first grade games, Strudwick was featured on the cover of The Rugby League News.

For the 1973 season, Strudwick transferred to Easts. He became Easts first grade player number 638. Strudwick played nine premiership games over the next two seasons, scoring three tries.

In 1975, Strudwick turned out for Parramatta, scoring one try in six premiership games. He was the Eels first grade player number 334.

Strudwick played his last premiership game on 11 May 1975, losing 13–18 to his old club Canterbury-Bankstown, but scoring a try for the Eels. He was a bench player for the 1975 Amco Cup final, which the Eels lost 7–17 to Easts.

Strudwick's first grade premiership career spanned 64 games, scoring 14 tries over six seasons with three different clubs.
