= Terry Murphy (rugby league) =

Australian rugby league footballer

Personal information
- Full name: Terrence Andrew Murphy
- Born: 2 April 1952 (age 72); Sydney, New South Wales, Australia

Playing information
- Position: Wing, Centre
Club
Years	Team	Pld	T	G	FG	P
1970–74	Canterbury-Bankstown	37	7	0	0	21
1975	Newtown Jets	17	5	0	0	15
	Total	54	12	0	0	36
- Source: As of 19 April 2019

Terry Murphy is an Australian former rugby league footballer who played in the 1970s. He played for Canterbury-Bankstown and Newtown in the New South Wales Rugby League (NSWRL) competition.

== Playing career ==
Murphy made his first grade debut for Canterbury-Bankstown in 1970 against St George. Murphy spent his first 2 seasons at Canterbury mainly playing for the reserve grade team but by 1973 became the first choice winger for the club. That season, Canterbury reached the finals but were eliminated by Newtown in the first week.

In 1974, Canterbury reached their first grand final since their last appearance in 1967 against South Sydney. Murphy was selected to play on the wing as a late inclusion for Bernie Lowther. Canterbury went on to lose the 1974 NSWRL grand final against Eastern Suburbs 19–4. The grand final defeat would be Murphy's last for the club. In total, he played 81 games for Canterbury across all grades.

In 1975, Murphy joined Newtown and played 17 games for the club scoring 5 tries in his only season there before retiring.
