= Ken Jones (rugby league) =

Australian rugby league footballer (born 1950)

Personal information
- Born: 23 May 1950 (age 76)

Playing information
- Position: Prop
Club
Years	Team	Pld	T	G	FG	P
1971–76	Eastern Suburbs	29	0	0	0	0

Ken Jones (born 23 May 1950) is an Australian former rugby league footballer.

A Bondi United junior, Jones made his first–grade debut for Eastern Suburbs in the 1970 NSWRFL season and won the club's most improved player award. He had a season with Bramley in 1972-73, playing 11 matches for the English club. In 1974, Jones was a prop in the Eastern Suburbs side which defeated Canterbury in the grand final.
