= Noel Thornton =

Australian rugby league footballer and coach (1943–2018)

Personal information
- Full name: Noel Francis James Thornton
- Born: 3 June 1943 Warwick, Queensland, Australia
- Died: 11 January 2018 (aged 74) Sydney, New South Wales, Australia

Playing information
- Position: Hooker
Club
Years	Team	Pld	T	G	FG	P
1965–1966	Western Suburbs	35	2	0	0	6
1968–1969	Cronulla-Sutherland	43	5	0	0	15
	Total	78	7	0	0	21

Coaching information
Club
Years	Team	Gms	W	D	L	W%
1974	Cronulla-Sutherland	22	9	0	13	41
- Source: Whiticker/Hudson

Noel Thornton (3 June 1943 − 11 January 2018) was an Australian rugby league footballer who played in the 1960s and later became a coach in the 1970s.

== Playing career ==
Thornton's career started at Western Suburbs, and he played two seasons with them between 1965 and 1966. Thornton played hooker during his career. He also played for Cronulla-Sutherland for two seasons between 1968 and 1969, and went on to coach the club for the 1974 NSWRFL season.
