= John Rheinberger =

Australian rugby league footballer (born 1954)

Personal information
- Born: 6 August 1954 (age 72) Sydney, New South Wales, Australia

Playing information
- Position: Centre
Club
Years	Team	Pld	T	G	FG	P
1975	Eastern Suburbs	2	0	0	0	0

John Rheinberger (Sydney, New South Wales) is an Australian former rugby league and rugby union footballer. He made just two appearances for Eastern Suburbs. One of those two appearances came in 1975, including the 1975 Grand Final in which Easts beat the St George Dragons 38–0, a record grand final score at the time. Rheinberger, who played in the centre position, was virtually plucked out of obscurity by Easts' coach Jack Gibson. Rheinberger had spent the early months of the 1974 season trialling with the Eastern Suburbs rugby union fourth grade side as a winger, Ironically, they were unable to find a place for him.

Following the 1975 grand final John Rheinberger never played in another first grade match, suffering a serious shoulder injury in the following year's pre-season. Rheinberger made his return in the club's Under 23s side that year, and again won a premiership. He was also a talented cricketer who represented Australian Schoolboys in 1972, and had a long career in Indoor Cricket.
