= Paul Mills (rugby league) =

Australian rugby league footballer

Personal information
- Full name: Paul Mills
- Born: Australia

Playing information
- Position: Wing
Club
| Years | Team | Pld | T | G | FG | P |
|---|---|---|---|---|---|---|
| 1971–75 | St. George | 56 | 15 | 0 | 0 | 45 |

Paul Mills is an Australian former rugby league footballer who played in the 1970s.

== Playing career ==
Originally from the Waratah - Mayfield Club, in Newcastle, New South Wales, Mills was a speedy winger with the St George Dragons and played with them for five seasons between 1971 and 1975. Mills played wing in the 1975 Grand Final, although he left the club after that match.
