= Johnny Mayes =

Australia rugby league player (1947–2025)

Personal information
- Born: 29 April 1947 New South Wales, Australia
- Died: 30 July 2025 (aged 78) Evans Head, New South Wales, Australia

Playing information
- Position: Halfback
Club
Years	Team	Pld	T	G	FG	P
1968–72	Eastern Suburbs	47	21	0	2	65
1973	Manly-Warringah	24	16	0	1	49
1974–77	Eastern Suburbs	63	34	0	0	102
	Total	134	71	0	3	216
Representative
Years	Team	Pld	T	G	FG	P
1975	Australia	3	0	0	0	0
1978	Newcastle

Johnny Mayes (29 April 1947 – 30 July 2025) was an Australian rugby league halfback who represented Australia in the 1975 World Cup. He also played in three consecutive premiership-winning teams from 1973 to 1975, the first for Manly-Warringah and the latter two for Eastern Suburbs.

== Club career ==
=== Eastern Suburbs (1968–1972) ===
Mayes had a slow start to his career with Eastern Suburbs owing to competition from established 1967–68 Kangaroo tour half Kevin Junee. He first played first grade in 1968, but was still mostly in reserve grade for several years. When Junee was injured in the years after winning the Rothmans Medal in 1970, Mayes spent a considerable amount of time in first grade and for part of 1972 actually relegated Junee to the reserves - though by finals time Junee had displaced him again, playing in the club's 19–14 grand final loss to Manly-Warringah.

=== Manly-Warringah (1973) ===
Being a similar type of halfback to Junee, Mayes naturally sought another club to be sure of a first grade berth and Manly, with Dennis Ward dropping out, picked him up for the 1973 season. Mayes' growth as a player that year was remarkable. He scored sixteen tries - four in one match against Penrith - and won Rugby League Week's Player of the Year award. He was freely tipped to go on the 1973 Kangaroo tour but was not chosen, and was, remarkably, swapped for Junee so he could return to Easts the following year.

=== Eastern Suburbs (1974–1977) ===
This rather unusual swap was surprisingly beneficial for Mayes. Junee was the 1974 season's leading try-scorer, whilst Mayes' courageous defence and frequent darting runs helped Easts develop a powerful attack and solid defence that ensured the team dropped only seven games under coach Jack Gibson in 1974 and 1975. In the 1975 grand final Mayes scored a brilliant try after an arcing run cross-field by winger Bruce Pickett and another one after running through a gaping hole, whilst he scored four tries for the second time against Canterbury-Bankstown.

However, with Junee's return to Easts and the unexpected emergence of the relatively unknown Kevin Hastings, Mayes spent much of 1976 in reserve grade again despite actually being the incumbent Australian test halfback. During the 1976 season, Mayes played in Easts victory in their unofficial 1976 World Club Challenge match against reigning British champions St. Helens at the Sydney Cricket Ground. With Junee gone for good, he fought with Hastings for a first grade spot in 1977 before returning to Newcastle where he captained the Newcastle representative team to a win over New Zealand in 1978.

In all Mayes played 134 first grade games for 71 tries and three field goals (two two-point and one one-point). In 1975 he was the season's leading try-scorer with sixteen.

His feat of playing in three consecutive premiership sides for different clubs is comparable only with Glenn Lazarus in the early 1990s for Canberra and the Brisbane Broncos, who played in four premiership sides between 1989 and 1993 and with Cooper Cronk who won three premierships with the Melbourne Storm and the Sydney Roosters from 2017 to 2019.

== International career ==
At the end of the 1975 season, Mayes was selected to represent Australia in that year's Rugby League World Cup, playing in the 24–8 win over New Zealand at Carlaw Park in Auckland and the 18–6 win over Wales at the St Helens Ground in Swansea. His final game for Australia came in a 16–13 loss to England at Central Park in Wigan.

== Death ==
Mayes died from a brain tumour on 30 July 2025, at the age of 78.

== See also ==
- Whiticker, Alan and Hudson, Glen; The Encyclopedia of Rugby League Players. ISBN 1-875169-76-8
