= Malcolm Clift =

Australian RL coach and former rugby league footballer

Personal information
- Full name: Malcolm Douglas Clift
- Born: 31 October 1936 (age 90) Canterbury, New South Wales, Australia

Playing information
- Position: Centre
Club
Years	Team	Pld	T	G	FG	P
1954	Canterbury-Bankstown	4	0	0	0	0

Coaching information
Club
Years	Team	Gms	W	D	L	W%
1973–77	Canterbury-Bankstown	118	62	7	49	53
1985	Leeds	28	16	2	10	57
1991	Gold Coast Seagulls	22	2	1	19	9
	Total	168	80	10	78	48
- Source: As of 25 October 2019

Malcolm Clift (born 31 October 1936) is an Australian former rugby league footballer and former coach of Canterbury-Bankstown, Leeds and the Gold Coast Seagulls.

== Background ==
Clift was born in Canterbury, New South Wales, Australia.

== Career ==
Clift began his career at Canterbury-Bankstown as a centre. In 1960 he had his last playing season, and started coaching. He coached Canterbury-Bankstown to the 1974 Grand Final, which the club lost against Eastern Suburbs. Clift stopped coaching for a period between 1977 and 1982. In 1985, he coached English side Leeds, but left after one season.

Clift later coached the Gold Coast Seagulls. He retired in 1991 after coaching for one season at the Gold Coast. That year, the club endured a horror year on the field, only winning two matches and finished last with the Wooden Spoon.

After his retirement, Clift assisted Chris Anderson with his coaching term.

== Sources ==
- Whiticker, Alan & Hudson, Glen (2006) The Encyclopedia of Rugby League Players, Gavin Allen Publishing, Sydney
