= Barry Reilly =

Australian RL coach & former rugby league footballer (1948–2021)

Personal information
- Full name: Barry Reilly
- Born: 24 March 1948 Warwick, Queensland, Australia
- Died: 5 May 2021 (aged 73)

Playing information
- Height: 163 cm (5 ft 4 in)
- Weight: 79 kg (12 st 6 lb)
- Position: Second-row, Lock
Club
Years	Team	Pld	T	G	FG	P
1967–71	Eastern Suburbs	78	12	0	0	36
1972	Cronulla-Sutherland	7	0	0	0	0
1973–79	Eastern Suburbs	120	8	0	0	9
	Total	205	20	0	0	45

Coaching information
Club
Years	Team	Gms	W	D	L	W%
1990	Eastern Suburbs	2	1	0	1	50

Barry 'Bunny' Reilly (24 March 1948 – 5 May 2021) was an Australian rugby league footballer who played in the 1960s and 1970s.

== Career ==
He played in the NSWRFL Premiership for the Eastern Suburbs Roosters from 1966 to 1971 and 1973–79, and the Cronulla-Sutherland Sharks in 1972.

Reilly was also known as 'The Axe' because of his defensive technique, which it was said allowed him to chop down opposition attackers like an axe. He was also a member of the Eastern Suburbs premiership-winning sides in 1974 and 1975. During the 1976 NSWRFL season, Reilly played as a prop forward for Eastern Suburbs in their unofficial 1976 World Club Challenge match against British champions St. Helens in Sydney.

Also a backrower, Reilly played almost 200 matches for the Roosters and was named as a bench player in that club's 'Team of the Century'.

During the 1990 season, Reilly helped out the club as a caretaker coach.

Reilly died on 5 May 2021 from kidney failure.
