= Bruce Pickett =

Australian rugby league footballer

Personal information
- Full name: Bruce Pickett
- Born: 26 August 1952 (age 74) Sydney, New South Wales, Australia

Playing information
- Position: Wing
Club
Years	Team	Pld	T	G	FG	P
1973	Newtown Jets	12	6	0	0	18
1974–77	Eastern Suburbs	40	15	0	0	45
1978–79	Newtown Jets	16	2	0	0	6
	Total	68	23	0	0	69
- Source: As of 19 April 2019

Bruce Pickett is an Australian former rugby league footballer who played in the 1970s. He played for Eastern Suburbs and Newtown in the New South Wales Rugby League competition.

== Playing career ==
A Newtown junior, Pickett made his first grade debut for Newtown in 1973. Under the coaching of Jack Gibson, Newtown finished 4th in 1973. Pickett played in all of Newtown's finals matches as the club fell short of a grand final appearance losing to Cronulla-Sutherland in the preliminary final.

In 1974, Pickett departed the club and signed with Easts at the same time that Jack Gibson was announced as their new coach. Pickett missed out on playing in the club's 1974 premiership winning team which defeated Canterbury in the grand final.

In 1975, Eastern Suburbs went on to claim the 1975 minor premiership and reach the 1975 NSWRL grand final against St George. Easts went on to win their second straight premiership defeating St George 38–0 at the Sydney Cricket Ground with Pickett scoring a try. The match is mainly remembered for the white boots worn by St George player Graeme Langlands. The 38–0 scoreline remained as the heaviest defeat in a grand final until Manly defeated Melbourne 40–0 in the 2008 decider.

Pickett played with Eastern Suburbs until the end of the 1977 season before re-joining Newtown. In his 2 seasons back at Newtown, the club finished last on the table claiming the wooden spoon in 1978 and in 1979 finished second last above North Sydney on the table.
