= Ian Mackay (rugby league) =

Australian rugby league footballer

Personal information
- Full name: Ian Mackay
- Born: 21 October 1952 (age 74) Sydney, New South Wales, Australia

Playing information
- Position: Prop
Club
Years	Team	Pld	T	G	FG	P
1973–76	Eastern Suburbs	70	4	0	0	12
1977	South Sydney	13	0	0	0	0
	Total	83	4	0	0	12
Representative
Years	Team	Pld	T	G	FG	P
1975	Australia	3	0	0	0	0
- Source: As of 17 April 2019

Ian Mackay is an Australian former rugby league footballer who played in the 1970s. He played for Eastern Suburbs and South Sydney in the New South Wales Rugby League (NSWRL) competition.

== Background ==
Mackay played his junior rugby league for Alexandria Rovers in the South Sydney competition but signed with rivals Eastern Suburbs in 1973.He also played for Paddington Colts in the Eastern Suburbs Junior League from 1969 to 1972.

== Playing career ==
Mackay made his first grade debut for Easts in 1973. In 1974, Eastern Suburbs won the minor premiership under the coaching of Jack Gibson. Mackay was selected to play at prop in Easts 19-4 victory over Canterbury-Bankstown in the 1974 NSWRL grand final at the Sydney Cricket Ground winning their first premiership in 29 years.

In 1975, Mackay was selected to play for Australia at the World Cup and featured in 3 matches. At club level, Eastern Suburbs went on to claim the 1975 minor premiership and reach the 1975 NSWRL grand final against St George. Easts went on to win their second straight premiership defeating St George 38-0 at the Sydney Cricket Ground with Mackay scoring a try. The match is mainly remembered for the white boots worn by St George player Graeme Langlands. The 38-0 scoreline remained as the heaviest defeat in a grand final until Manly defeated Melbourne 40-0 in the 2008 decider.

Mackay left Easts at the end of 1976 and joined arch rivals South Sydney. Mackay played one season for Souths in 1977 making 13 appearances before retiring.
