= Codebreaker (disambiguation) =

A codebreaker is a person who performs cryptanalysis. Codebreaker or Code breaker may also refer to:

== Film and TV ==
- Code Breakers (film), a 2005 American TV film about West Point
- The Code-Breakers, a 2006 British documentary film about software
- Codebreaker (film), a 2011 British film about Alan Turing
- The Codebreaker, an episode of the television documentary series American Experience about the life of cryptanalyst Elizebeth Smith Friedman

== Literature ==
- The Code Breaker, a 2021 book by Walter Isaacson
- The Codebreakers, a 1967 book on history of cryptography by David Kahn
- Code:Breaker, a 2008 manga by Akimine Kamijyo

== Other ==
- Rugby Codebreakers, a statue group of the dual code Rugby players Billy Boston, Clive Sullivan and Gus Risman in Cardiff Bay
- Codebreaker or double knee facebreaker, a wrestling move
- Code Breaker, a video game cheat device
- Codebreaker (video game), an Atari 2600 video game

== See also ==
- Code talker, a wartime language speaker
- Signals intelligence
