= United Linux =

Linux distribution

United Linux was an attempt by a consortium of Linux distributors to create a common base distribution for enterprise use, so as to minimize duplication of engineering effort and form an effective competitor to Red Hat. The founding members of United Linux were SUSE, Turbolinux, Conectiva (now merged with MandrakeSoft to form Mandriva) and Caldera International (later renamed to SCO Group). The consortium was announced on May 30, 2002. The end of the project was announced on January 22, 2004.

United Linux mascot

== Formation ==
With the rise of Linux during the 1990s, Linux distributions proliferated. Since the Linux kernel and GNU were both free software, anyone could put together and market a distribution. Many industry observers feared fragmentation and wide-ranging incompatibility, similar to the UNIX wars of the early 1990s.

The first moves towards the United Linux project were made at COMDEX in November 1999. There were a number of false starts, but the participants consistently agreed that a unified Linux platform for business made sense. The key factors for success were identified early in 2000.

Starting in March and April 2002, the United Linux board put together a base technical specification, getting input from the four consortium members and their business partners and vendors.

UnitedLinux, LLC was formed May 29, 2002 and the project was announced to the world on May 30, 2002. Two legal agreements were signed by the founding members at this time, the Master Transaction Agreement (MTA) and the Joint Development Contract (JDC); the JDC was also signed by UnitedLinux, LLC. These contracts provided, in part, that intellectual property related to UnitedLinux Software (with certain exceptions) would be assigned to UnitedLinux, LLC. Further, "[e]ach member shall have a broad, royalty-free license to all intellectual property rights in the UnitedLinux Software, entitling each member to "use, copy, modify, distribute, market, advertise, sell, offer for sale, sublicense ... in any manner the Software, including the rights to make derivative works of the Software, to provide access to the Source Code and/or Object Code to any third party, to incorporate the Software into other products or bundle the Software with other products for its own business purposes and any other unlimited right of exploitation"; existing open source licenses, such as the GNU General Public License, also continued to apply. Disputes were to be settled via International Chamber of Commerce (ICC) arbitration.

A first beta was released to United Linux member partners on August 14, 2002, a public beta was released on September 25, 2002 and United Linux 1.0 was released on November 19, 2002.

For a detailed case study in what led one of the four partners to embrace the ideals of United Linux see Caldera OpenLinux.

== Technical overview ==
The distribution was based on SUSE Linux and the Linux Standard Base, with the plan being for SUSE to do most of the engineering work and SCO, Turbolinux and Conectiva primarily to market the distribution in their territories and markets.

It was planned that version 1.0 would take six to eight months to release, be the current version for one year and be supported for another year after the release of 2.0. Minimum technical requirements were:

- Linux kernel 2.4.18 or higher
- GNU C Library 2.2.5
- Linux Standard Base compliant
- OpenI18N (formerly LI18NUX) compliant (internationalization and localization)
- GB 18030 compliant (the standard CJK character encoding used in China)
- GCC 3.1
- XFree86 4.2
- KDE 3.0

== Ending ==
On January 20, 2004, SCO filed a lawsuit against Novell, the then-current owner of SuSE.

The end of United Linux was announced in a Novell press conference on January 22, 2004 by Richard Seibt, president of the SUSE division. The stated reason was that the SCO v. IBM lawsuit and SCO's public attacks on Linux had made the alliance unworkable.

It emerged that no real work had been done on United Linux since soon after SCO v. IBM had started, and that SUSE had ceased active participation around this time. The last United Linux announcements were of Oracle Corporation support for it on 13 March 2003, and of AMD64 CPU support on 22 April 2003.

While some have reported that UnitedLinux ended, in fact the group did not gain consensus to dissolve the partnership and the legal entity remains in effect.

The SCO v. Novell complaint was amended on February 3, 2006 to add copyright infringement claims, relating to Novell's distribution of SuSE Linux. Novell responded on April 10 by filing a Request for Arbitration with the ICC, and asking that SCO's claims be stayed in the district court. They argued in the Request that through the MTA and JDC, "the UnitedLinux members agreed that each member would have an irrevocable, perpetual, and worldwide license to use and unlimitedly exploit any intellectual property rights of the other members in the UnitedLinux Software, which would be transferred to the LLC for this very purpose." Novell's motion to stay was granted in part, for those of SCO's claims relating to SuSE.

On September 14, 2007, SCO filed for bankruptcy, and on November 13, the court ruled at SCO's request that the arbitration was automatically stayed.

SuSE filed a motion to lift this stay on November 10, 2009. However, SCO objected on December 15, and SUSE's motion was denied on January 15, 2010.

== See also ==
- DCC Alliance
