= DCC Alliance =

The DCC Alliance (DCCA) was an industry association designed to promote a common subset of the Debian Linux operating system that multiple companies within the consortium could distribute. It was founded by Ian Murdock in 2005 and was wound up in 2007.

== History ==
The main force behind the DCC Alliance was Ian Murdock, the original founder of the Debian project. The DCC Alliance was formed whilst Murdock was CEO of Progeny Linux Systems, and he remained the key spokesperson for the consortium during their visible existence. The founding of the DCC Alliance was announced at LinuxWorld San Francisco on the 9 August 2005, following a number of pre-announcements.

The stated intention was to assemble a standards-based core of Debian, provide a predictable release cycle and Linux Standards Base compliance.

DCC Alliance shipped their first code 6 months after the original pre-announcements, providing a Linux Standards Base (LSB) 3.0 compliant set of program packages based on those available from Debian.

The Alliance's primary goals were to:

- Assemble a 100 percent Debian common core that addresses the needs of enterprise business users
- Maintain certification of the common core with the Free Standards Group open specification, the Linux Standard Base
- Use the Alliance's combined strength to accelerate the commercial adoption of Debian
- Work with the Debian project to ensure predictable release cycles and features important to commercial adoption

== Membership ==
There were two classes of membership in the DCC Alliance:

- Members, those organisation creating products based on the DCC-provided core subset of packages.
  - Knoppix, LinEx, Linspire, MEPIS, Progeny, Sun Wah Linux, Xandros
- Associate Members, Independent software vendors, hardware vendors, OEMs and community partners providing related support or business.
  - credativ, Skolelinux, UserLinux

Membership remained open to additional organizations with an interest in Debian-based solutions. The most visible absent from any involvement was the Ubuntu distribution who declined to join the Alliance. The Ubuntu founder, Mark Shuttleworth, stated in 2006 that he did not believe that the DCC Alliance had any future.

One of the founding members, MEPIS, later left the DCCA, citing "creative differences". MEPIS transitioned their SimplyMEPIS Linux distribution from a Debian Unstable/DCCA-provided core to an Ubuntu-based one.

In 2006 Ian Murdock left the DCC Alliance to chair the Linux Standard Base workgroup and later moved his employment to Sun Microsystems. In 2007, Progeny, the original driver behind the consortium was wound up. In 2006, Xandros was still claiming that Xandros "leads the engineering team at the DCCA".

== Name ==
When originally formed, the names given to the media were that of the "Debian Core Consortium", and then "Debian Common Core". Following trademark notification from the Debian project, the name was withdrawn and replaced—without a formal announcement—by "DCC Alliance". Ian Murdock explained that the D should no longer be treated as an abbreviation of Debian, but of DCC—becoming a recursive acronym for "DCC Common Core".

Notably, the "Debian" trademark that was being denied to Mr. Murdock and the DCC Alliance originates from a combination of the -ian part of Mr. Murdock's own given name, concatenated to that of his wife's name; Debra Murdock, and the decision over the infringement of the trademark fell to Branden Robinson, then Debian Project Leader (DPL), who was an employee of Progeny Linux Systems (and of Mr. Murdock) during the time at which the decision was made. Mr. Robinson stated that this would not represent a conflict of interest.
