= SFR (disambiguation) =

SFR is a French telecommunications company.

SFR may also refer to:

- Seth "Freakin" Rollins, professional wrestler
- Società per le Strade Ferrate Romane, a 19th century Italian railway company
- Société française radio-électrique, former French radio company
- Sodium-cooled fast reactor
- Special function register in a microcontroller
- Speed Factory Racing, a Spanish auto racing team
- Star forming region
- Strange Famous Records
- Swiss franc (SFr.)
- Single-family rental
- SFR, Inc., current publisher of Dragon Dice

== See also ==
- Socialist Federal Republic of Yugoslavia (SFR Yugoslavia)
