= DCCA =

DCCA may refer to:

- Daly City, California, a city in California
- Diameter Credit-Control Application
- DCC Alliance, a now-defunct Debian-based industry consortium
- Delaware Center for the Contemporary Arts, a museum in Wilmington, Delaware.
- Dichloroisocyanuric acid
