= Open High School =

Open High School:

- Open High School (Virginia)
- Open High School of Utah
- Open High School Sydney
