= Ralf Brown's Interrupt List =

Comprehensive list of features of x86-based computers

Ralf Brown's Interrupt List (aka RBIL, x86 Interrupt List, MS-DOS Interrupt List or INTER) is a comprehensive list of interrupts, calls, hooks, interfaces, data structures, CMOS settings, memory and port addresses, as well as processor opcodes for x86 machines from the 1981 IBM PC up to 2000 (including many clones), (Note: Contents of INTER release 61 (as formatted ASCII text): INTERRUP.LST  5.700.679 bytes,  151.173 lines FARCALL.LST      81.446 bytes,    2.178 lines MEMORY.LST      144.149 bytes,    3.606 lines PORTS.LST       879.133 bytes,   23.893 lines CMOS.LST         77.175 bytes,    2.015 lines I2C.LST         141.061 bytes,    3.563 lines OPCODES.LST     624.174 bytes,   33.936 lines MSR.LST          81.345 bytes,    2.190 lines SMM.LST           7.939 bytes,      291 lines 86BUGS.LST      119.004 bytes,    3.004 lines               7.856.105 bytes,  225.849 lines) most of it still applying to IBM PC compatibles today. It also lists some special function registers for the NEC V25 and V35 microcontrollers.

== Overview ==
The list covers operating systems, device drivers, and application software; both documented and undocumented information including bugs, incompatibilities, shortcomings, and workarounds, with version, locale, and date information, often at a detail level far beyond that found in the contemporary literature. A large part of it covers system BIOSes and internals of operating systems such as MS-DOS, OS/2, and Windows, as well as their interactions.

It has been a widely used resource by IBM PC compatible system developers, analysts, as well as application programmers in the pre-Windows era. Parts of the compiled information have been used for and in the creation of several books on systems programming, some of which have also been translated into Chinese, Japanese and Russian. As such the compilation has proven to be an important resource in developing various closed and open source operating systems, including Linux and FreeDOS.

The project is the result of the research and collaborative effort of more than 650 listed contributors worldwide over a period of 15 years, of which about 290 provided significant information (and some 55 of them even more than once). The original list was created in January 1985 by Janet Jack and others, and, named "Interrupt List for MS-DOS", it was subsequently maintained and mailed to requestors on Usenet by Ross M. Greenberg until 1986. As of October 1987, it is maintained by Ralf D. Brown, a researcher at Carnegie Mellon University's Language Technologies Institute. Information from several other interrupt listings was merged into the list in order to establish one comprehensive reference compilation. Over the years, Michael A. Shiels, Timothy Patrick Farley, Matthias R. Paul, Robin Douglas Howard Walker, Wolfgang Lierz and Tamura Jones became major contributors to the project, providing information all over the list. The project was also expanded to include other PC development-related information and therefore absorbed a number of independently maintained lists on PC I/O ports (by Wim Osterholt and Matthias R. Paul), BIOS CMOS memory contents (by Atley Padgett Peterson), processor opcodes (by Alex V. Potemkin) and bugs (by Harald Feldmann). Brown and Paul also conducted several systematic surveys on specific hard- and software details among a number of dedicated user groups in order to validate some info and to help fill some gaps in the list.

Originally, the list was distributed in an archive named INTERRUP in various compression formats as well as in the form of diffs. The distribution file name was changed to include a version in the form INTERnyy (with n = issue number, and yy = 2-digit release year) in 1988. In mid 1989 the distribution used ZIP compression to keep its size manageable. When the archive reached the size of a 360 KB floppy in June 1991, the distribution split into several files following an `INTERrrp.ZIP` naming scheme (with rr = revision starting with 26 for version 91.3, and p = part indicator of the package starting with letter A). Officially named "MS-DOS Interrupt List" and "x86 Interrupt List" (abbreviated as "INTER") by its maintainer, the community coined the unofficial name "Ralf Brown's Interrupt List" (abbreviated as "RBIL") in the 1990s.

The publication is currently at revision 61 as of 17 July 2000 with almost 8 MB of ASCII text including close to 9600 entries plus about 5400 tables, fully cross linked, which would result in more than 3700 pages (at 60 lines per page) of condensed information when printed. Of this, the interrupt list itself makes up some 5.5 MB for more than 2500 pages printed.

While the project is not officially abandoned and the website is still maintained (as of 2025), new releases have not been forthcoming for a very long time, despite the fact that information was still pending for release even before the INTER61 release in 2000. New releases were planned for at several times in 2001 and 2002, but when they did not materialize, portions of the new information on DOS and PC internals provided by Paul were circulated in preliminary form in the development community for peer-review and to assist in operating system development.

== See also ==
- BIOS interrupt call
- DOS API
- INT (x86 instruction)
- Malware analysis
