= IPG =

IPG may refer to:

- Immobilized pH gradient, a method used in isoelectric focusing
- Impedance phlebography, a medical test
- Implanted pulse generator (neurostimulator), a battery-powered device designed to deliver electrical stimulation to the brain
- Independent Publishers Group, a book distributor
- Interactive program guide, another name for an electronic program guide, a graphical user interface for cable TV boxes, satellite TV boxes, VCRs, DVRs and televisions which displays programming information
- Internet Press Guild an invitation-only group of journalists, editors and industry analysts
- Interpacket gap (interframe gap), a networking term describing a part of total latency on a link
- The Interpublic Group of Companies, a marketing and communications group
- Intertape Polymer Group, a packaging products manufacturer
- IPG Photonics, a fiber laser manufacturer
- iPod games file extension
