= Progeny =

Progeny may refer to:

- A genetic descendant or offspring
- Progeny Linux Systems, a defunct company which provided Linux platform technology
- Progeny (Stargate Atlantis), an episode of the television series Stargate Atlantis
- "Progeny", a song on the Celtic Frost album Monotheist
- Progeny (film), a 1998 movie about an alien abduction
- "Progeny", a short story from author Philip K. Dick
- The Progeny, a title occasionally used to refer to Sophocles' lost play, the Epigoni
- Progeny: Seven Shows from Seventy-Two, a live album box set from band Yes
- "Progeny" (Legends of Tomorrow), an episode of Legends of Tomorrow

Also see:

- Progyny, a company that provides fertility services.
