= John Freeman (rugby) =

Wales international rugby league footballer

Johnny Freeman
Personal information
- Full name: John Freeman
- Born: 17 April 1934 Cardiff, Wales
- Died: 22 June 2017 (aged 83) Butetown, Wales

Playing information

Rugby union
- Position: Centre
Club
Years	Team	Pld	T	G	FG	P
≤1954–54	CIACS

Rugby league
- Position: Wing, Centre
Club
Years	Team	Pld	T	G	FG	P
1954–67	Halifax	396	290	15	0	900
Representative
Years	Team	Pld	T	G	FG	P
1963	Wales	1	0	0	0	0

John "Johnny" Freeman (17 April 1934 – 22 June 2017) was a Welsh rugby union, and professional rugby league footballer who played in the 1950s and 1960s. He played club level rugby union (RU) for Cardiff International Athletic Club, as a centre, and representative level rugby league (RL) for Wales, and at club level for Halifax, as a wing, or centre.

== Background ==
Johnny Freeman was born in Cardiff, Wales on 17 April 1934. He attended South Church Street school, and played rugby at Cardiff International Athletic Club (CIACS) alongside Billy Boston.

== Playing career ==
=== Club career ===
Johnny Freeman was paid a joining fee of £1,050 by Halifax in 1954.

During the 1955–56 season, Freeman played on the wing in Halifax's 2–13 defeat by St.Helens in the 1955–56 Challenge Cup Final at Wembley Stadium, London on Saturday 28 April 1956, and played on the wing, and scored a try in Halifax's 9–10 defeat by Hull F.C. in the Championship Final at Maine Road, Manchester on Saturday 12 May 1956.

Johnny Freeman holds Halifax's tries in a season record with 48 scored in the 1956–57 season.

Johnny Freeman played on the wing in Halifax's 10–0 victory over Featherstone Rovers in the 1963–64 Yorkshire Cup Final during the 1963–64 season at Belle Vue, Wakefield on Saturday 2 November 1963.

He played on the wing in the 15–7 victory over St. Helens in the Championship Final during the 1964–65 season at Station Road, Swinton on Saturday 22 May 1965.

Johnny Freeman's Testimonial match at Halifax took place in 1967 against Keighley at Thrum Hall, Halifax, and he retired at the end of the same season.

Freeman is a Halifax Hall of Fame Inductee, and is the club's all-time leading try scorer with 290 scored between 1954 and 1967.

=== International honours ===
Johnny Freeman represented Wales (RL) while at Halifax in 1963 against France at Stade des Minimes, Toulouse on Sunday 17 February 1963.

After scoring 38 tries in the first 20 games of the 1957–58 Northern Rugby Football League season, Johnny Freeman also looked set to take a place on the 1958 British Lions tour to Australasia. However, a knee injury in December 1957 cut short his international ambitions, and put him out of the game for a year.

== Playing style ==
In the book "The Glory of Their Times: Crossing the Colour Line in Rugby League", Robert Gate's description of Johnny Freeman was... "It appeared that every time Freeman got the ball he scored or at least threatened to score. Certainly the crowds began to expect miracles when he was in possession. Here was a man who could go the length of the field, who could break tackles when apparently held, who could find that extra gear, when already seemingly flat out, who could go past defenders on the inside or the outside, who would be first to any kick forward and who could pluck interception tries out of nothing. He had star quality, good looks and an effortless movement which was captivating."

== Personal life ==
Johnny Freeman is the cousin of the British and British Empire heavyweight boxing champion, Joe Erskine.
