= Codebreakers Statue =

- Cerflun Torwyr Cod
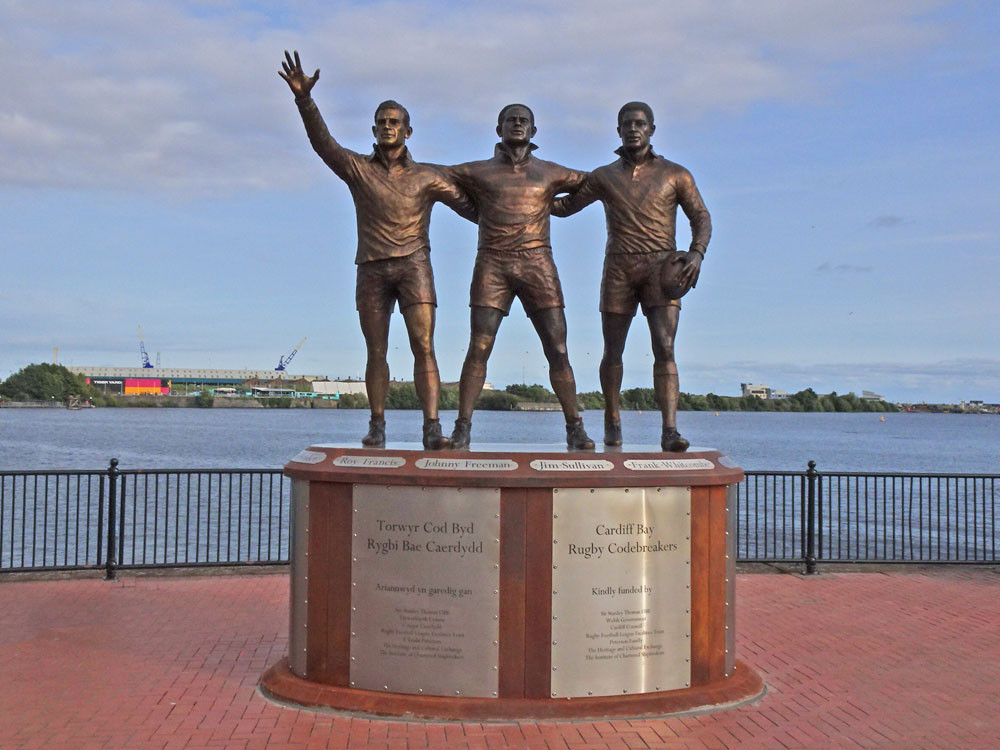
- Location: Cardiff Bay, Wales
- Designer: Steve Winterburn
- Material: Bronze
- Completion date: 2023

The Codebreakers Statue (Welsh: Cerflun Torwyr Cod) is a group statue of the Welsh rugby players Billy Boston, Clive Sullivan, and Gus Risman in Cardiff Bay. Each of the three players began his career in rugby union, before switching to another code of football, rugby league, hence the name "Codebreakers". It is the first statue to depict historical and named Black Welsh men.

== Campaign ==
The "One Team. One Race, Honouring the Cardiff Bay Rugby Codebreakers" campaign was launched in 2020 to raise money to create the statue, headed by its chairman, Sir Stanley Thomas, and vice-chairman, Huw Thomas, the leader of Cardiff City Council, and comprising community leaders from the area.

=== The statue ===
The statue is designed to represent all the players from the Cardiff area who switched codes, with the public invited to choose the three players depicted from a list of 13 notable players from Tiger Bay, Butetown, Grangetown, Adamsdown, and Splott. The public consultation attracted over 14,000 votes. The ceremony, in Landsea Square, took place in the presence of 88-year-old Boston and relatives of Sullivan and Risman. While Boston, Risman, and Sullivan are depicted in the statue group, the other nominees—Frank Whitcombe, Jim Sullivan, Roy Francis, Colin Dixon, Dennis Brown, Gerald Cordle, Joe Corsi, Johnny Freeman, Dave Willicombe, and William 'Wax' Williams—all have named plaques on the monument.
