= David A. Wiley =

David Wiley
- Wiley in 2025

Academic background
- Education: Marshall University (BA); Brigham Young University (PhD)

Academic work
- Discipline: Education
- Sub-discipline: Educational technology Free content
- Institutions: Brigham Young University; Open High School of Utah; Utah State University; Stanford Law School

David A. Wiley, an American academic, entrepreneur, and writer, is an associate professor in the Department of Marketing, MIS, and Entrepreneurship at Marshall University. He was formerly the chief academic officer of Lumen Learning, education fellow at Creative Commons, and adjunct faculty of instructional psychology and technology at Brigham Young University, where he was previously an associate professor. Wiley's work on generative AI, open content, open educational resources, and informal online learning communities has been reported in many international outlets, including The New York Times, The Hindu, MIT Technology Review, and Wired.

== Early life and education ==
Wiley is originally from Barboursville, West Virginia, where he received his undergraduate degree in vocal performance from Marshall University in 1997. He later earned his doctoral degree in instructional psychology and technology from Brigham Young University in 2000.

== Career ==
In 1998 by Wiley initiated the Open Content Project for evangelizing open content with the Open Publication License. In 2003 Wiley announced, the Open Content Project has been succeeded by Creative Commons, where he joined as "Director of Educational Licenses".

He was also chief openness officer of Flat World Knowledge in 2007, founder of the Open High School of Utah, and was associate professor of instructional technology for the McKay School of Education, and founder and director of the Center for Open and Sustainable Learning (COSL), at Utah State University. He has received the National Science Foundation's CAREER award and served as a nonresident fellow of the Center for Internet and Society at Stanford Law School. Fast Company rated Wiley #78 in a list of the top 100 creative people for 2009. Wiley was also named a Peery Social Entrepreneurship Fellow in the Marriott School of Business in 2012. He was awarded the Ashoka Fellowship in 2017 for his work.

=== Center for Open and Sustainable Learning ===
The Center for Open and Sustainable Learning (COSL) operates on the principle that "free and open access to educational opportunity is a basic human right". Because it is getting easier to develop and distribute electronic tools around the globe, COSL sees the use of learning objects as a way to bring "open education" to all areas in an effort to fulfill "a greater ethical obligation than ever before to increase the reach of opportunity".

=== Reusability and learning objects ===
Wiley's early work focused on the design and development of learning objects. On one website, reusability.org, he explains that learning objects are developed to be reused as a solution to the problem of "teacher bandwidth". The "teacher bandwidth" problem is defined as "the number of students we are capable of serving with our distance education offerings".

=== Writings ===
From 2001 to 2004, Wiley wrote a column in the Association for Educational Communications and Technology (AECT) academic journal TechTrends entitled "Back Burner".

Wiley's 10 most influential publications, as ranked by Google Scholar, are:

- Connecting learning objects to instructional design theory D Wiley, 2000
- Instructional use of learning objects (D Wiley, 2000)
- Learning object design and sequencing theory (D Wiley, 2000)
- Learning objects (D Wiley, 2001)
- Using weblogs in scholarship and teaching (T Martindale, DA Wiley, 2004)
- Online Self-organizing Social Systems (DA Wiley, EK Edwards, 2002)
- Exploring research on internet-based learning: From infrastructure to interactions (JR Hill, D Wiley, LM Nelson, S Han, 2004)
- Open content and open educational resources: Enabling universal education (T Caswell, S Henson, M Jensen, D Wiley, 2008)
- On the sustainability of open educational resource initiatives in higher education (D Wiley, 2006)
- A non-authoritative educational metadata ontology for filtering and recommending learning objects (MM Recker, DA Wiley)

Many of Wiley's publications are available from the BYU institutional repository, Scholars Archive.
