= Harbour Centre =

Mixed-use skyscraper in Vancouver, British Columbia

Coordinates: 49.2846°N 123.1123°W

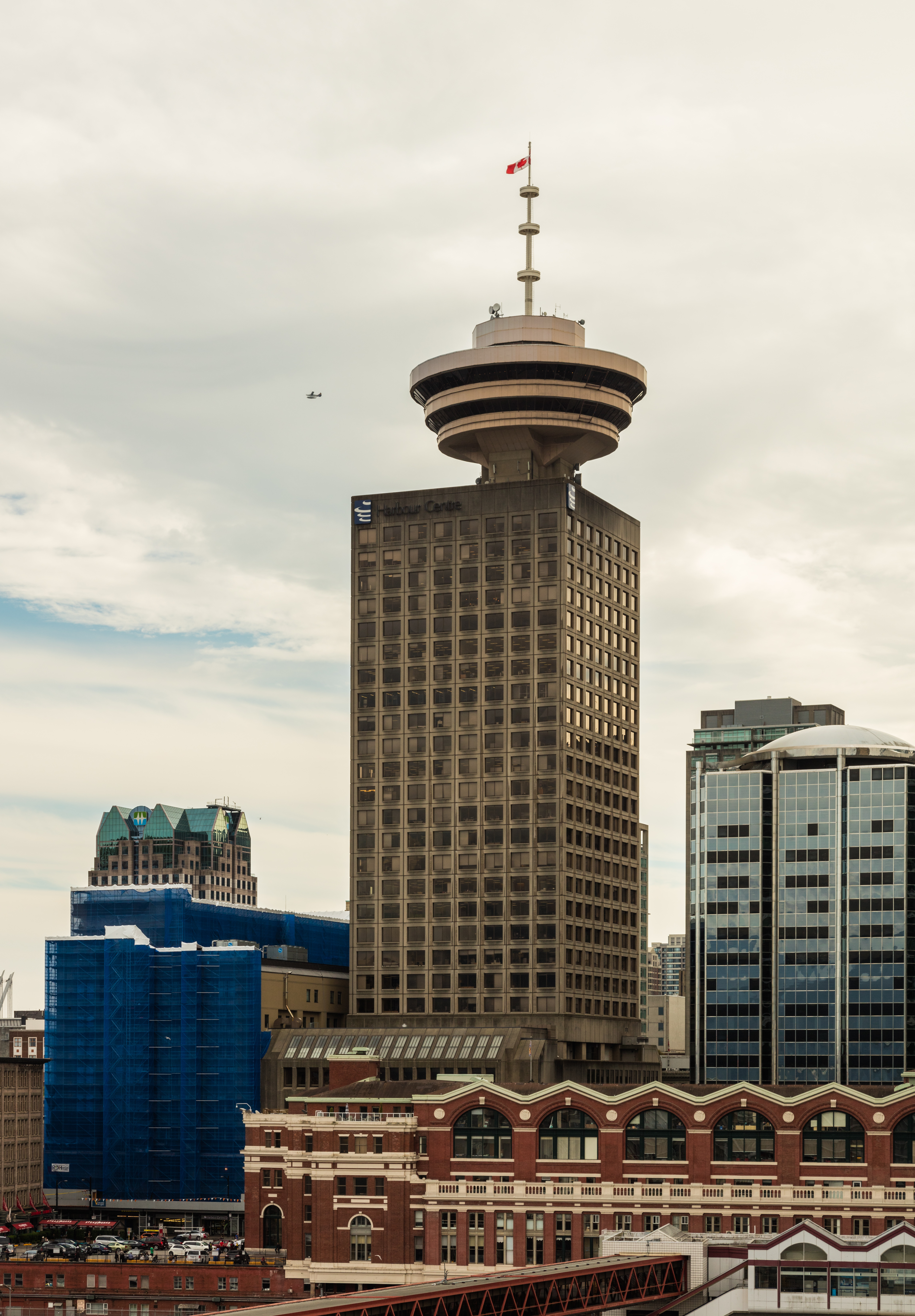

General information
- Type: Mixed-use: Observation, office, commercial, restaurant
- Architectural style: Brutalist / Modernist
- Opening: August 13, 1977; 49 years ago

Height
- Architectural: 147 m (482 ft) (CTBUH)

Technical details
- Floor count: 40

Design and construction
- Architect: WZMH Architects

Website
- harbourcentre.com

Harbour Centre is a skyscraper in the central business district of Downtown Vancouver, British Columbia, Canada, which opened in 1977. The "Lookout" tower atop the office building makes it one of the tallest structures in Vancouver and a prominent landmark on the city's skyline. With its 360-degree viewing deck, it also serves as a tourist attraction with the Top of Vancouver revolving restaurant, offering a physically unobstructed view of the city.

Harbour Centre is located at 555 West Hastings Street in Downtown Vancouver. It is steps away from Waterfront station, a major multi-modal transit hub which serves as the Downtown Vancouver terminal for various TransLink operations including SeaBus, West Coast Express, SkyTrain and buses. Simon Fraser University operates its downtown Harbour Centre campus in the adjoining Spencer building and houses the Center for Dialogue and Canadas World.

Vancouver Coast Guard Radio operated until 2015 from Harbour Centre, providing distress watch and vessel traffic services to the North Arm Fraser River, Burrard Inlet, Indian Arm, English Bay and Howe Sound.

== History ==
The downtown Simpsons-Sears department store was located here before it closed in 1987.

During the dot-com boom of the 1990s, it served as the headquarters for several tech firms, including Stormix Technologies, NetNation and others.

== Height ==
Designed by WZMH Architects, the building is listed as being 28 stories tall, though the tower/observation deck/revolving restaurant extends above the 28 office floors (claimed to be on the 33rd and 35th floors). There is some disagreement as to the building's height. According to the Vancouver Lookout's website the observation deck is 168 m (551 ft) above street level. The CTBUH however lists the building's architectural height as actually being 147 m (482 ft). Furthermore, Skyscraperpage lists the buildings height to the roof as being only 139.6 m (458 ft). This is stated to be the height from the Hastings Street entrance while the height from the back entrance on Cordova Street is 146 m (479 ft). It also lists the buildings pinnacle height to the tip of the antenna as being 177.1 m (581 ft).

The building was British Columbia's tallest measured by pinnacle height until the construction of Living Shangri-La in 2009.

== Tourist attraction ==
The Vancouver Lookout tourist attraction, located atop the Harbour Centre business building, was officially opened on August 13, 1977 by Neil Armstrong, whose footprint was imprinted onto cement and was on display on the viewing/observation deck until disappearing during renovations. Glass elevators whisk visitors 168 meters (553 feet) skyward from street level to the Observation Deck in 40 seconds.

== In television and film ==
In Beyond Belief: Fact or Fiction?, a group of young teenage girls ride the famous glass elevator to the top to dine at the fictional "Above the Clouds" restaurant and the elevator breaks down. (S04E13 - "Above the Clouds"). Harbour Centre can also be seen in the Arrow episode "Dark Waters". The Harbour Centre is visible in the background along with the rest of the downtown Vancouver skyline at the beginning of The X-Files episode "2Shy". This building was also filmed in some episodes from the original MacGyver TV series in and around Vancouver. This building also had some shots from the TV series Danger Bay. There were also some shots from the Schwarzenegger film The 6th Day and the film Blade: Trinity. In The NeverEnding Story, the building is seen in the closing scene, when Bastian is flying with Falkor, to get some revenge over the children. It is also depicted in Final Destination Bloodlines as the Skyview restaurant tower.

== Gallery ==
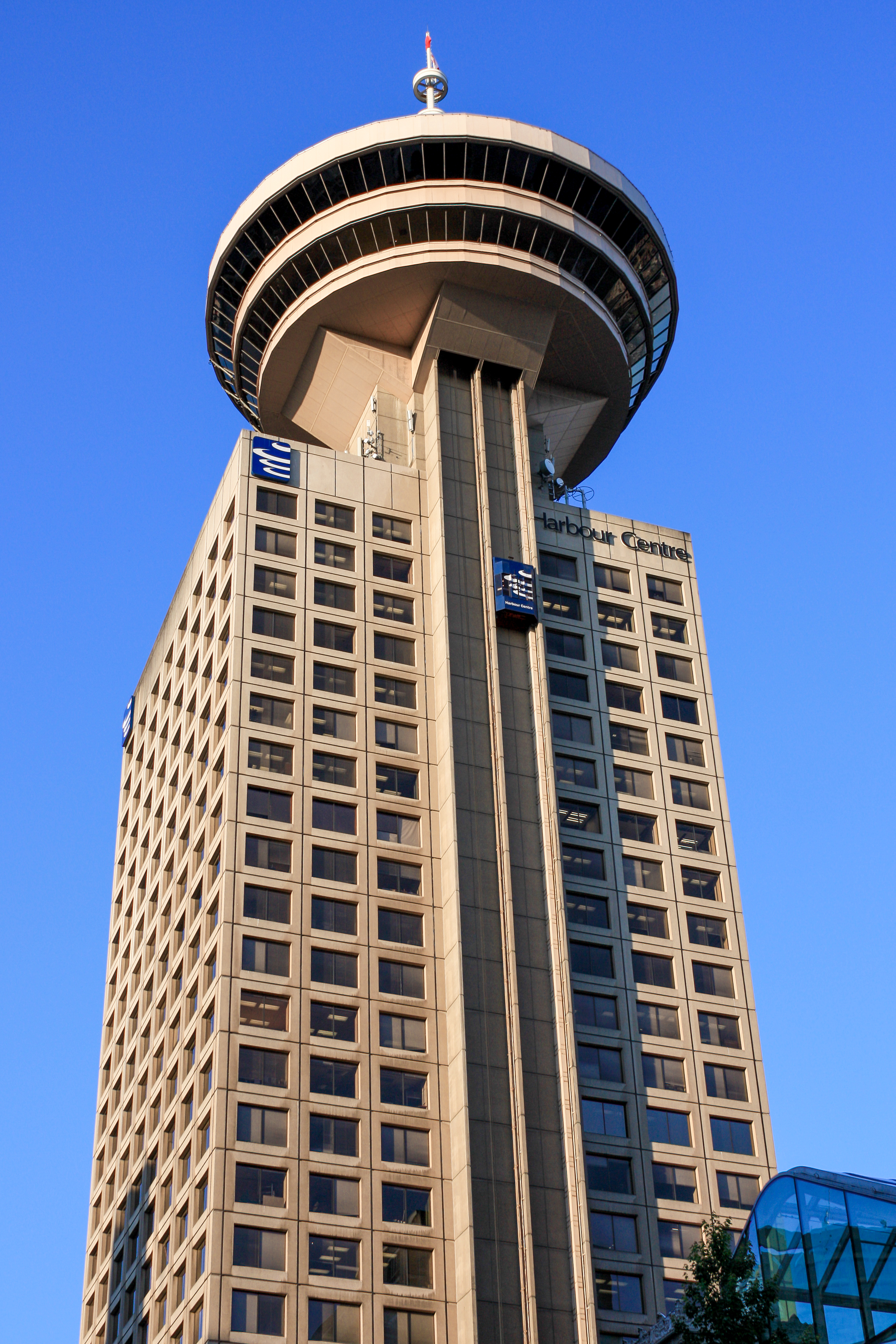
Detail of the Vancouver Lookout

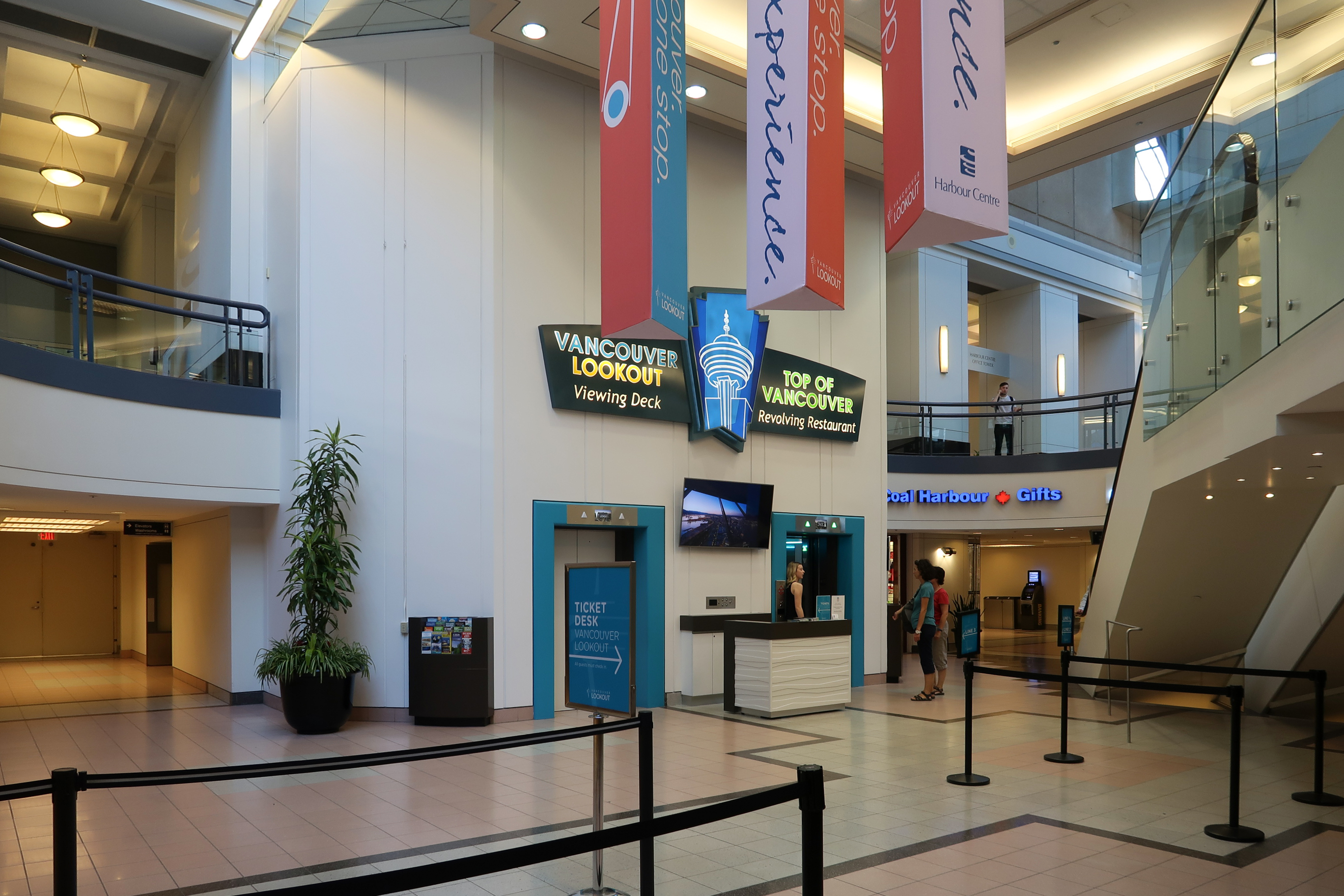
Vancouver Lookout Lobby

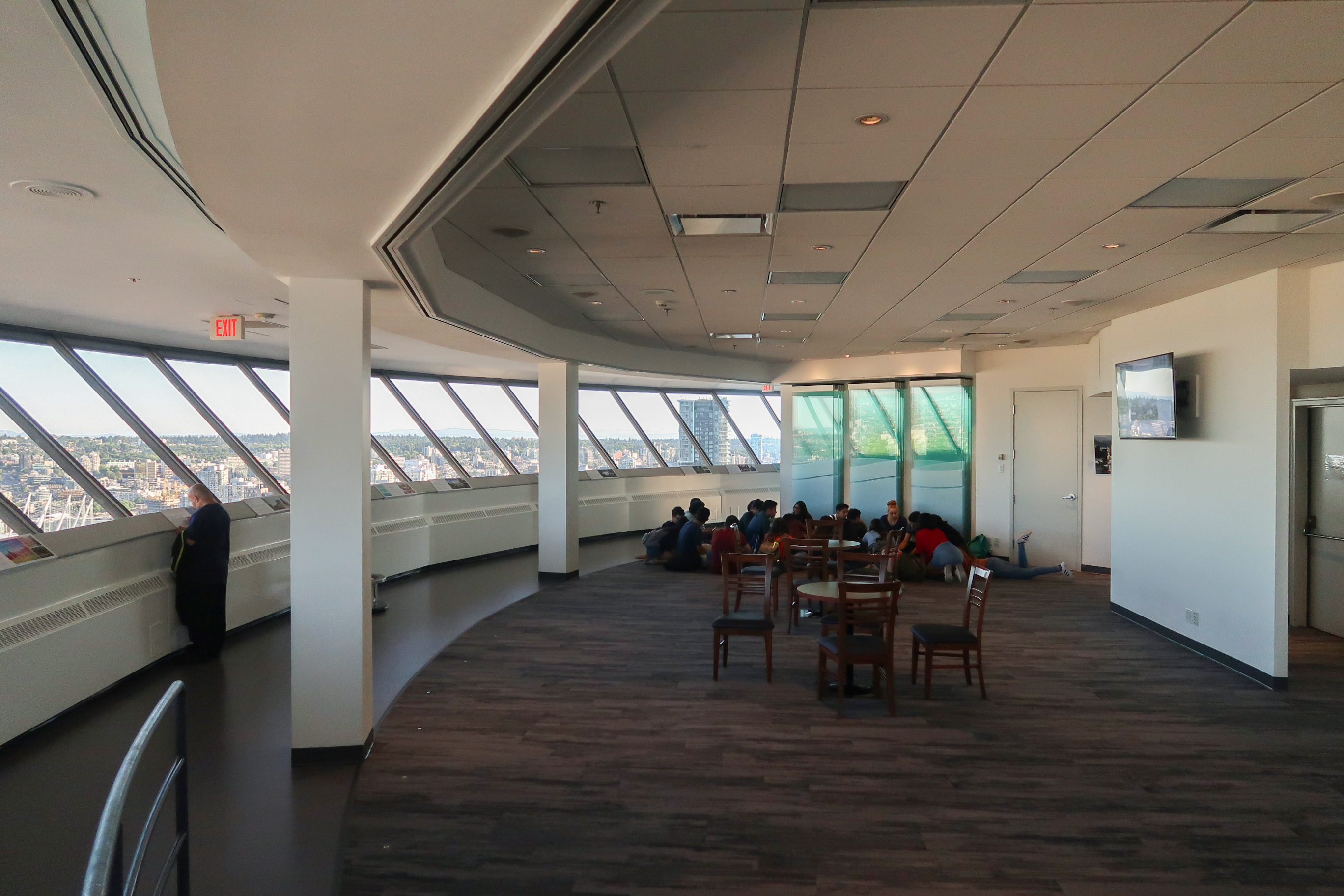
Vancouver Lookout

View from the Vancouver Lookout in 1998

== See also ==
- List of tallest buildings in Vancouver
- Lighthouse of Alexandria, a possible influence on design.
