= Bruce Perens' Open Source Series =

Series of books edited by Bruce Perens

The Bruce Perens' Open Source Series was a series of books edited by Bruce Perens as series editor and published by Prentice Hall PTR. Principal topics were Linux and other open-source software. These books were intended for professional software developers, system and network administrators, and power users.

The series was published between 2002 and 2006; there were 24 titles in the series.

Each book was licensed under the Open Publication License and was made available as a free download several months after publication. It was the first book series to be published under an open content license.
