= Internet Press Guild =

- Formation: April 5, 1996
- Members: ...
- Website: www.netpress.org

The Internet Press Guild (IPG) is an internet-based professional organization for technology journalists. It was originally formed in 1996 to help generalist, non-technical journalists understand and write about the Web and other technology topics. More recently, it is mainly focused on being an active, private forum for members to discuss professional topics.

== About ==
The IPG presents itself as, "A professional organization promoting excellence in journalism about the Internet and technology." A key part of the guild's activities is a private mailing list that connects editors, writers and analysts in the internet press community.

As veteran freelance journalist and IPG member Pam Baker put it in 2009:

If you look closely, you’ll find IPG member bylines on nearly every important technology news story told over several decades. … Incompetence isn’t tolerated in this group; the IPG has been known to eat its own. … IPG members are outstanding technology writers offered membership by invitation only. Such is issued by the most demanding and exacting of all judges: their most accomplished peers. … Many IPG members hold degrees in technology or science rather than in journalism and/or were programmers, consultants and CIOs before they were writers.

== History ==
The Guild descended from the USENET group alt.internet.media-coverage. In the mid-1990s, the journalists who relied on the group became frustrated by the disruptive behavior of a few group members. Several members, including Esther Schindler and Steven J. Vaughan-Nichols, proposed moving their discussions to an invitation-only email list.

As Baker described it in 2009:

IPG began years ago as alt.internet.media-coverage. As the founders of the group tell it: "In response to an infamous net kook who began to alter the signal to noise ratio, the IPG was formed as an invitation-only private mailing list, as happened with a lot of Usenet groups at the time for similar reasons."

On April 5, 1996, the IPG announced its formation in a press release with the byline of Vaughan-Nichols—who has since been named IPG chair. The release described the Guild:

Writers, editors, and analysts from around the world are uniting to take a stand against shoddy, inaccurate reporting about the Internet. The Internet Press Guild … is a non-profit organization dedicated to promoting accuracy and excellence in reporting on and about the Internet. … The IPG will serve as an information clearinghouse for all the hapless reporters out there who are being told to write about the net, but have no idea where to begin.

As described by Vaughan-Nichols, the IPG was originally formed to help generalist, non-technical journalists understand and write about the Web and other technology topics. More recently, it is mainly focused on being an active, private forum for members to discuss professional topics.

=== ACLU award ===
The IPG and its members are recipients of the Civil Liberties Award from the ACLU Foundation, as part of the fight to prevent censorship through the ultimately failed Communications Decency Act of 1996. The Guild filed Friends of the Court Briefings in support of the ACLU in the Reno v. American Civil Liberties Union case, which established first amendment protection for the internet.

At the time, an important factor was the strong presence of a large contingent of well known technology reporters—ranging from reporters in the tech press to more mainstream outlets such CBS News.

=== In defense of online journalism: The SCO case and the IPG ===
In 2003, the SCO Group attempted to assert intellectual ownership of Linux, which came to be known as the SCO-Linux disputes. Pamela Jones, editor of Groklaw was outed on the internet and put under heavy pressure by SCO chief executive Daryl McBride, who funded efforts to disparage her coverage.

The Internet Press Guild came to the defense of Ms. Jones and publicly denounced SCO's attempt to influence press coverage. This incident was one of the first attempts by a corporation to suppress internet reporting and the IPG was able to push back on that specific instance, if not on the trend as a whole.

=== The Care and Feeding documents ===
In the late 1990s, as technology editors were getting deluged with stories about new websites popping up, the Internet Press Guild established a set of guidelines as to how to best respond to such requests. As part of the discussion came the realization that public relations staffers were not aware of the realities facing internet journalists.

To help improve the flow and quality of information, the Guild first published "The Care and Feeding of The Press" document, which was widely circulated on the internet and became part of the educational corpus for many public relations university classes. A later addition "The Care and Feeding of Editors" allowed for a broader discussion of fact management on the internet.

== See also ==
- Bruce Byfield
- Mary Jo Foley
- David Gewirtz
- Ed Bott
- Ross Greenberg – a founding member
- Tristan Louis – a founding member
- Robin "Roblimo" Miller
