= Ross Greenberg =

American software developer (1956–2017)

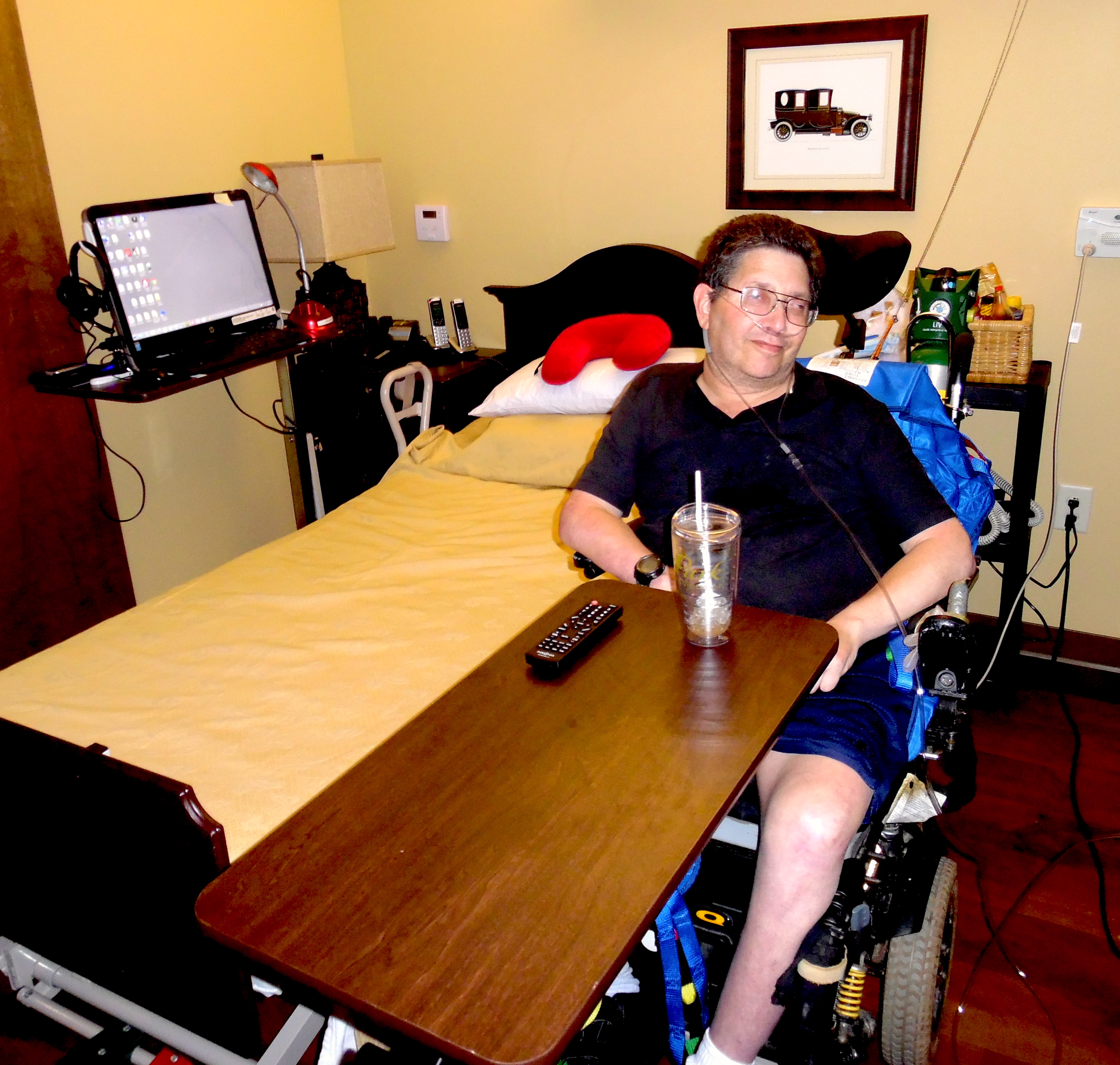
- Ross Greenberg at Chelsey Park Health and Rehab. (August 2016)
- Born: Ross Matthew Greenberg; September 16, 1956; New York City, New York, U.S.
- Died: February 16, 2017 (aged 60); Dahlonega, Georgia, U.S.
- Occupations: programmer; journalist
- Known for: antivirus pioneer
- Notable work: Flushot Plus

Ross Matthew Greenberg (September 16, 1956 – February 16, 2017) was an American software developer, noted for creating one of the first antivirus software products. He also worked in journalism, and was a founding member of the Internet Press Guild.

== Career ==
=== Flushot Plus ===
In 1987, as Software Concepts Design, Greenberg released one of the first two heuristic antivirus software utilities, Flushot Plus. He released it as shareware for $10.

O'Reilly book author Roger A. Grimes described Flushot Plus as "the first holistic program to fight MMC [malicious mobile code]".

=== Journalism ===
In the 1980s, Greenberg was a frequent contributor to PC Magazine, and was the primary sysop of its CompuServe forum, PC MagNet.

In 1996, he became a founder member of the Internet Press Guild.

== Personal life ==
Greenberg was born in New York City, and raised in Syosset. His parents were Muriel and Walter Greenberg. He had two sisters: Toni (Richard) Koweek and Carla G. Kaplan.

Greenberg attended the State University of New York at Stony Brook, graduating in 1978.

Greenberg's wife, Dawn, was from Marietta, Georgia.

Greenberg was survived by his wife, son Wade Maxwell Greenberg of Marietta, step-daughter Chanice Hughes-Greenberg of NYC, and elder sister Toni of Hudson.

=== Health issues and death ===
Greenberg suffered from multiple sclerosis, first diagnosed in the mid-1980s. His elder sister described the form of his illness as "aggressive".

In late 2009, after his condition became too challenging for his family to care for him, Greenberg moved to a nursing home near Atlanta, Georgia. He later moved to a nursing home in Forsyth, Georgia. In August 2015, he was moved to Chelsey Park Health and Rehabilitation Center, Dahlonega, Georgia, where he died after contracting pneumonia, in February 2017.

== See also ==
- Interrupt List for MS-DOS
