= Scox =

Scox may refer to:

- Scox, or Shax, a demon in the Ars Goetia
- SCOX, the NASDAQ stock ticker for the SCO Group
