= Bruce Byfield =

Canadian journalist (born 1958)

- Born: May 13, 1958 (age 68)
- Occupations: Journalist, writer
- Employer(s): Linux.com (contributing editor); Linux Journal (blogger); Linux Pro Magazine (columnist)
- Known for: Writing on free and open source software

Bruce Byfield (born May 13, 1958) is a Canadian journalist who specializes in writing about free and open source software. He has been a contributing editor at Linux.com, and his articles have appeared on the Datamation, LWN, Linux Developer Network, and LinuxPlanet sites. He also writes a monthly blog for the Linux Journal website, which provides introductions to popular free software such as LibreOffice, and Scribus, and a weekly blog for Linux Pro Magazine about free software and the issues surrounding it. In addition to his online publications, he has published in such magazines as Maximum Linux, Ubuntu User and The New Internationalist, and writes a column about the command line for Linux Pro Magazine. His personal blog, Off the Wall, is a collection of short personal essays.

Before becoming a journalist, Byfield was marketing and communications director at Progeny Linux Systems, and product manager at Stormix Technologies. He also designs elearning courses and is a marketing and communications consultant.

Byfield lives in Burnaby, British Columbia. In addition to free and open source software, his interests include parrots, running, science fiction, collecting Northwest Coast Art and listening to punk-folk music. He is the co-founder of the Mature Student Award at the Freda Diesing School of Northwest Coast Art at Northwest Community College, and currently serves on the board of the YVR Art Foundation.

He is unrelated to the conservative journalist, publisher and editor Ted Byfield of Alberta.

== Books ==
- Witches of the Mind: A Critical Study of Fritz Leiber. West Warwick: Necronomicon Press. ISBN 0-940884-35-6.
- Designing with LibreOffice, 2016, Friends of OpenDocument Inc., ISBN 978-1-921320-44-6, (download under CC BY-SA version 3.0 or later)
