= Clive Sullivan =

Welsh rugby league footballer (1943-1985)

Clive Sullivan MBE
Personal information
- Full name: Clive Anthony Sullivan
- Born: 9 April 1943 Splott, Cardiff, Wales
- Died: 8 October 1985 (aged 42) Hull, Humberside, England

Playing information

Rugby union
Club
Years	Team	Pld	T	G	FG	P
	Army Rugby Union

Rugby league
- Position: Wing
Club
Years	Team	Pld	T	G	FG	P
1961–74	Hull F.C.	340	247	0	0	741
1974–80	Hull Kingston Rovers	213	119	0	0	354
1980–81	Oldham	18	3	0	0	9
1981–83	Hull F.C.	11	3	0	0	9
1983–84	Doncaster	9	0	0	0	0
1985	Hull F.C.	1	0	0	0	0
	Total	592	372	0	0	1113
Representative
Years	Team	Pld	T	G	FG	P
1967–73	Great Britain	17	13	0	0	39
1969–79	Wales	15	7	0	0	21

Coaching information
Club
Years	Team	Gms	W	D	L	W%
1973–74	Hull F.C.	0	0	0	0
1983–84	Doncaster RLFC
	Total	0	0	0	0
- Relatives: Tony Sullivan (son)

Clive Anthony Sullivan MBE (9 April 1943 – 8 October 1985) was a Welsh rugby league footballer. A Great Britain and Wales international winger, he played for Hull F.C. and Hull Kingston Rovers in his career, winning Challenge Cup medals with both clubs, and also played for Oldham and Doncaster. Captaining Great Britain in 1972, he was the first black captain for Great Britain in any sport. He was part of the Great Britain team which won the 1972 Rugby League World Cup. His son, Anthony Sullivan, had a successful career with Hull Kingston Rovers, St. Helens, Wales in both rugby league and union, and Cardiff RFC.

== Early life ==
Sullivan was born in Splott, a suburb of Cardiff on 9 April 1943. His mother's family was from Antigua and his father was Jamaican. Sullivan's early playing career was plagued by injury; multiple operations left doctors uncertain he would ever walk normally, and the prospect of a professional career in rugby seemed improbable. In 1961 he joined the army after leaving school and working for a while as a motor mechanic. He was posted to Catterick in the North Riding of Yorkshire, and while there was picked for an inter-corps rugby match on account of being Welsh. Sullivan chose to play in the match as admitting to having a major injury would have led to his being invalided out of the army. His plan was to deliberately play badly to avoid being picked again. However, instinct took over and after scoring a long distance try with no ill effects, he decided to make the most of the army training to further progress his hopes of playing rugby.

== Rugby League career ==
=== Hull ===
After an unsuccessful trial game at Bradford Northern, he was approached by the touch judge from the game and offered a trial at Hull. His trial at Hull was a different story. Dubbed "Mr. X" by the Hull Daily Mail, he scored three tries on his debut against Bramley on 9 December 1961, and signed as a professional the following day.

Sullivan's first three seasons were restricted by his army duties, three knee operations and a nearly fatal car crash in October 1963, although he returned to play again just three months after the accident. He left the army after a spell in Cyprus in 1964. Free of his army commitments he returned to Hull in time to play the last game of the season.

Rugby league club Hull had different ideas about Sullivan and gave the young man, who boasted phenomenal speed, a chance to play rugby league. In his début for Hull, Sullivan had an outstanding game and gained the support of the Hull club and city. Sullivan became known for his exceptional speed. His upper body was deceptively strong, which gave him excellent cover defence. Despite his knees requiring constant attention and further operations, Sullivan played a total of 352 games for Hull, scoring 250 tries. In his 213 games for Hull Kingston Rovers he scored 118 tries.

Sullivan played on the wing and scored a try in Hull FC's 12–9 victory over Featherstone Rovers in the 1969–70 Yorkshire Cup Final at Headingley Rugby Stadium, Leeds on Saturday 20 September 1969,

He was captain-coach of Hull F.C. from 1973 to '74. He was awarded an MBE in the 1974 New Year Honours list for services to rugby league.

=== Hull Kingston Rovers ===
In April 1974, Sullivan joined Hull Kingston Rovers for a fee of £3,250. He made his debut for Rovers against Doncaster in August 1974.

Sullivan played on the wing (replaced by substitute Gerald Dunn) in Hull Kingston Rovers' 16–13 victory over Wakefield Trinity in the 1974–75 Yorkshire Cup Final at Headingley Stadium, Leeds on Saturday 26 October 1974, and played on the wing and scored a try in the 11–15 defeat by Leeds in the 1975–76 Yorkshire Cup Final at Headingley, Leeds on Saturday 15 November 1975.

Sullivan played on the wing and scored a try in Hull Kingston Rovers' 26–11 victory over St. Helens in the 1977 BBC2 Floodlit Trophy Final at Craven Park, Hull on Tuesday 13 December 1977, and played on the wing in the 3–13 defeat by Hull F.C. in the 1979 BBC2 Floodlit Trophy Final at the Boulevard, Hull on Tuesday 18 December 1979.

Sullivan played on the wing in Hull Kingston Rovers' 10-5 victory over Hull F.C. in the 1979–80 Challenge Cup Final at Wembley Stadium, London on Saturday 3 May 1980, in front of a crowd of 95,000

=== Later career ===
In 1980, Sullivan was released by Hull KR at his own request, and subsequently joined Oldham.

Sullivan returned to Hull in 1981 on the coaching staff, but made occasional appearances as a player to cover for injuries. At the age of 39, he played on the wing in the 1981–82 Challenge Cup Final replay (replacing Dane O'Hara, having played in the first match, but had subsequently been reprimanded by Hull for an off-field issue) in Hull F.C.'s 18–9 victory over Widnes at Elland Road, Leeds on Wednesday 19 May 1982, in front of a crowd of 41,171.

=== International career ===
His international career opened for Great Britain in 1967. The following year he played three World Cup matches, grabbing a hat-trick against New Zealand. In 1970, he toured Australasia, but only participated in one test due to injury. He however won a further three test caps against New Zealand in 1971. In 1972 he was handed the captaincy of Great Britain, and played two tests against France. The World Cup took place that same year, and he captained Great Britain to become world champions. He scored a try in each of Great Britain's four games and scored a try to level 10–10 against Australia in the World Cup Final, after a length of the field run.

In 1973 his Great Britain career came to an end with three tests against Australia.

The 1975 Rugby League World Cup saw Sullivan lead Wales in all four matches, scoring a try in the victory over England in the second game for the Welsh team. Wales finished third in the five-team World Cup.

In all, Sullivan represented Great Britain 17 times and appeared at three World Cups, 1968 and 1972 with Great Britain, and in 1975 for Wales.

== Death and commemorations ==
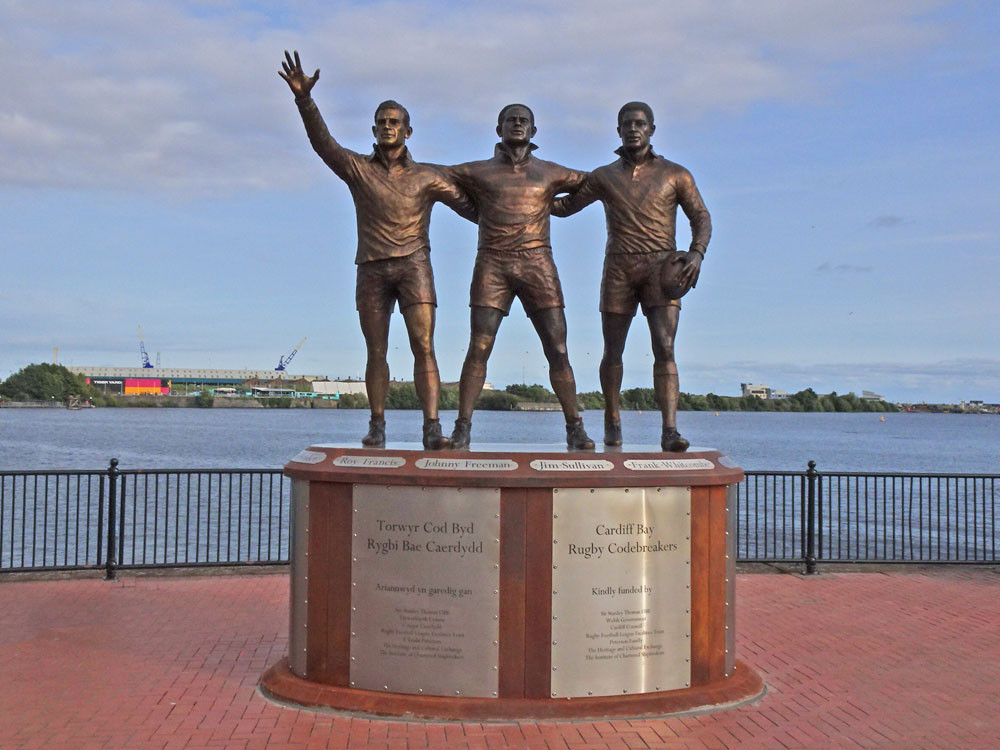
Sullivan features in the Cardiff Bay Rugby Codebreakers statue, together with Gus Risman (left) and Billy Boston (centre)

When Sullivan died of cancer in 1985, aged 42, the city of Hull held him in such high regard that a section of the city's main approach road, the A63 between the Humber Bridge and the city centre, was renamed Clive Sullivan Way in his honour. Since 2001 the Clive Sullivan Memorial Trophy has been awarded to the winner of the Rugby League local derby match between Hull and Hull Kingston Rovers in recognition of his service to both local clubs.

In 1993, Sullivan was one of six inaugural members to be inducted into Hull F.C.'s Hall of Fame. His widow Rosalyn attended the ceremony on his behalf.

In December 2020, Sullivan was named as one of three Welsh rugby league players to be honoured with a new statue in Cardiff Bay, the other two being Billy Boston and Gus Risman. The statue Cardiff Bay Rugby Codebreakers was unveiled in July 2023.

In April 2021, Sullivan was honoured in a Google Doodle to celebrate what would have been his 78th birthday.

In September 2022, Sullivan was inducted into the British Rugby League Hall of Fame.

== Career records ==
Sullivan still holds two records for Hull, which include the most tries in a career (250) and most tries in a match (7, against Doncaster on 15 April 1968), and is one of fewer than twenty-five Welshmen to have scored more than 1,000 points in their rugby league career.

== See also ==
- Andrew Watson (1856–1921), Scottish footballer widely considered to be the world's first black person to play association football at international level.
