= Rugby in Cardiff =

Overview of the sport in Cardiff, Wales

Rugby is played in Cardiff in both rugby league and rugby union forms.

== Cardiff RFC and the Arms Park ==
Between 2003 and 2009 there were two rugby union teams based at Cardiff Arms Park. The Cardiff Blues represented the region in the Celtic League and Heineken Cup, whereas Cardiff RFC represented the city in the Welsh Premier Division. From the start of the 2009–10 season, the Cardiff Blues relocated to the Cardiff City Stadium in the Leckwith area of the city. In May 2012 the Blues relocated back to the Arms Park. Cardiff Blues were renamed to "Cardiff Rugby" for the 2021–22 season.

== Rugby Union Clubs in Cardiff ==
Cardiff has around 23 clubs playing in the WRU national league system. As well as Cardiff RFC, playing in the Welsh Premiership, National Championship side Glamorgan Wanderers RFC play in the Ely area and are a well established first class club having been part of the old Merit Table structure.

Other WRU affiliated clubs in the Cardiff area are:

Cardiff Metropolitan University RFC, Rhiwbina RFC, Fairwater RFC, Old Illtydians RFC, Llandaff North RFC, Rumney RFC, Cardiff HSOB RFC, St. Peters RFC Llandaff RFC, Canton RFC, Whitchurch RFC, Llanrumney RFC, Tongwynlais RFC, Pentyrch RFC, Caerau Ely RFC, Llanishen RFC, Cathays RFC, St. Josephs RFC, Cardiff Saracens RFC, St. Albans RFC and Clwb Rygbi Cymry Caerdydd.

Cardiff University RFC though affiliated, do not play in the WRU league structure and instead compete in the BUCS Leagues for university sides. The side compete in the annual Welsh Varsity Match against Swansea University RFC, the biggest varsity game outside of Oxford – Cambridge in the UK.The match is the highlight of the university sporting year and is played at alternating high-profile venues including, Liberty Stadium in Swansea, Cardiff Arms Park and the Millennium Stadium. The university's Medical School runs its own separate team, Cardiff Medicals RFC which competes in separate competitions and in 2015 are the current UK Medical School Rugby Champions. Former players include current Welsh international Jamie Roberts.

== CIACS ==
Another side, Cardiff Internationals Athletic Club normally shortened to CIACS (pronounced "kayaks") were formed in the docks area of the city, known as Tiger Bay in 1946. CIACS has always reflected the multicultural nature of the docks area, hence the name Cardiff Internationals. The club is best known for having produced Billy Boston, who went on to become a rugby league footballer in the 1950s. The club represents the Grangetown, Cardiff Bay, Butetown and the Docks areas.

There are many other recreational non-affiliated sides playing in the city, including Cardiff Bus RFC, players being employees of the local transport authority.

== Cardiff Demons ==
Rugby league in Cardiff was represented by the successful men's Cardiff Demons RLFC side, a team that produced a handful of Super League players including Elliot Kear and Lloyd White as well as many other Welsh internationals in its short existence. They played at four grounds in and around the Cardiff area. Having previously been at Taffs Well RFC, Old Penarthians RFC, and St. Albans RFC, they finally settled at the St Peters RFC ground in the East of Cardiff. Past players include current Welsh Rugby Union internationals Gethin Jenkins and Andy Powell. The club's finest achievements came through getting through to the fourth round of the Challenge Cup in 2000, bowing out to Keighley Cougars and as winners of the Rugby League Conference National Shield in 2004, beating South Yorkshire side Moorends-Thorne Marauders in the final a competition for amateur clubs based outside the traditional 'heartland' of the sport.

In 2021, the 'Demons' name was resurrected for a new women's side, managed by Wales Rugby League to compete in the RFL Women's Super League South Western Conference, along with The Golden Ferns and Cornish Rebels. Demons won the inaugural title by defeating Eastern Conference Winners Army Rugby League 30–26 in the grand final, with a winning score in the last play of the match.

== Cardiff Blue Dragons Rugby League ==
In 2014, it was decided that the two open Rugby League sides in the city, Cardiff Demons and Cardiff Spartans would merge to form a new club, Cardiff City RLFC. The two clubs, both previously playing their open age sides in the Welsh Conference, would run two open age sides in the 2015 season, playing home games at Cardiff Arms Park, as well as develop the junior sides based at Llandaf North and Rumney. For 2017, Cardiff Blue Dragons Rugby League has entered into a partnership with Glamorgan Wanderers to play at The Memorial Ground. Cardiff Blue Dragons RLFC is now the largest Rugby League club in Wales with age grades up to senior sides for both male and female players. The men's team continues to play in the South Wales Premier.

== Cardiff Metropolitan University Rugby League ==
Cardiff Metropolitan University/UWIC RLFC were consistently one of the best university sides in Great Britain having won the national title twice in the early part of this century. They have produced a number of players for Cardiff Demons and the successful Wales Students side. The side will resume playing in the BUCS Leagues in 2016.

The University of South Wales, which has a campus in Cardiff, also fields Rugby Union and Rugby League sides usually playing at the University Sport Park in Treforest.

In 2023, Cardiff University established a men's Rugby League team playing in the Midlands and West 1 RFL division.

== Cardiff's rugby league history ==
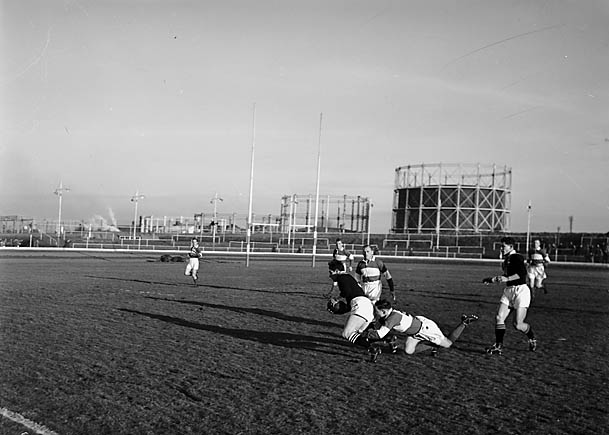
Cardiff Rugby League Club in a match against New Zealand 21 December 1951

The first attempt to bring rugby league to the capital was in 1949 when a Welsh League was formed. Cardiff were joined by teams from Amman Valley, Llanelli, Aberavon, Bridgend, Ystradgynlais, Neath and Pontarddulais.

Cardiff were champions of the first competition in 1949–50 but were denied a double after Ystradgynlais beat them in the Final. Llanelli were winners of the competition the year after but that didn't stop Cardiff being elected to the Rugby Football League Championship in 1951.

The League at the time consisted of 31 clubs in one division who each played a 36-game season. Cardiff finished 30th with a record of 5 wins and 31 defeats – only Liverpool City were below them.

With that the club and Welsh Rugby League at club level, was wound up for 30 years.

In 1981, Cardiff City Blue Dragons were formed and played out of Ninian Park, Cardiff under the management of David Watkins. The club enjoyed reasonable success and attracted high-profile Rugby Union converts such as Steve Fenwick, Tommy David, Brynmor Williams and Paul Ringer. In 1984 the club was moved to Bridgend where it lasted one more season before folding.

The success of Wales at international level in the 1990s led to the formation of South Wales. Coached by Clive Griffiths and managed by Mike Nicholas, the team played at Morfa Stadium, Swansea, Aberavon RFC's Talbot Athletic Ground and at Cardiff Arms Park.

However, the club only lasted one season in Rugby League's debut summer season of 1996. Finishing fifth in Division Two, the club had high hopes that it would be awarded a Super League franchise and although a strong case was put forward by Nicholas and Griffiths the Super League clubs refused to award it a place for the coming season and the club was wound up but the Cardiff Demons under-21 academy side were formed the year after. This side lasted for four seasons and were then replaced by an open-age side who played in the Rugby League Conference.

During 2014, the two main Rugby League clubs in Cardiff, Cardiff Demons and Cardiff Spartans, voluntarily merged to create a new club, Cardiff City RLFC. The kit and badge created for the new side pay homage to the Blue Dragons side of the early 1980s. For the 2017 season, Cardiff ARLFC play their home games at Glamorgan Wanderers RUFC (Memorial Ground), in the Ely suburb of the city. The club also runs a successful age grade set up, at U13, 15s and 17s, as well as Masters and Women's Rugby League. training on Tuesdays and Thursdays.
