= Stormix =

Stormix Technologies Inc. was a company that debuted its Debian-based Linux distribution with "Storm Linux 2000" in late 1999. Headquartered in the Harbour Centre, Vancouver, British Columbia, Stormix was an offshoot of NetNation Communications, at the time, one of the top-ten web hosting companies. In addition to Storm Linux, the company also produced a personal firewall, and began development of a customized rack mount server and dedicated VPN appliance. The company was probably one of the many ones overwhelmed by the dot-com bubble when it did not find more funds to continue the business at the beginning of 2001.
