= Turbolinux =

Japanese Linux distribution

Turbolinux is a discontinued Japanese Linux distribution targeting Asian users.

== Linux distribution ==
Turbolinux
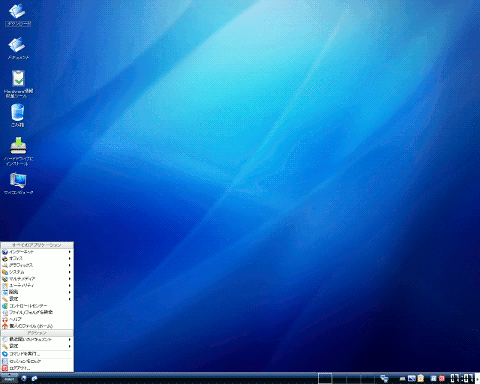
- Screenshot Screenshot
- Developer: Turbolinux
- OS family: Linux (Unix-like)
- Source model: Open source
- Latest release: 12.5 (Turbolinux Client); 16 (TurboLinux Enterprise Server); 4.0 (Appliance Server) / August 29, 2012 (Turbolinux Client); 2022-03? (TurboLinux Enterprise Server); August 29, 2012 (Turbolinux Appliance Server)
- Marketing target: Asian-language users
- Package manager: RPM
- Supported platforms: IA-32, x86-64 TurboLinux Enterprise Server: ARM (15-), x86
- Kernel type: Monolithic (Linux kernel)
- Official website: www.turbolinux.com

The Turbolinux distribution was created as a rebranded Red Hat distribution by (then) Pacific HiTech employee Scott Stone. Scott was the lead release engineer through version 3.6.

Turbolinux was notable for including licensed copies of CyberLink PowerDVD and Windows Media binaries codecs.

TurboLinux Enterprise Server 15 and 16 are based on openEuler.

== Company ==
ターボリナックス株式会社 Turbolinux, Inc.
- Native name: ターボリナックス株式会社
- Formerly: Pacific HiTech, Inc.
- Founded: September 1, 1992; 34 years ago in Salt Lake City, Utah September 1, 2002; 24 years ago in Shibuya, Tokyo (merged into subsidiary) May 1, 2009; 17 years ago in Shibuya, Tokyo (restructured as subsidiary of TL HOLDINGS, Inc.)
- Defunct: December 31, 2019 (Japan parent begins dissolution); March 31, 2020 (Japan parent liquidation ends)
- Fate: defunct
- Headquarters: Tokyo, Japan
- Products: operating system
- Parent: Software Research Associates, Inc. (2002-09-01-) livedoor Co., Ltd. (2004-03-15); TL HOLDINGS, Inc. (2009-05-01-); TurbolinuxHD Corporation (2013-04-01-); GEONEXT Corporation (2014-04-01-); FHT holdings Corp. (2019-04-01-); GreatDB (China Turbolinux, 2016-10-03-)

=== History ===
==== Pacific HiTech, Inc. era ====
Cliff Miller and Iris Miller started Turbolinux in 1992 under the name Pacific HiTech, Inc. in the basement of their home in Salt Lake City, Utah.,

In 1993, Pacific HiTech opened office in Tokyo, Japan.

==== Turbolinux, Inc. era ====
In 1999-06-08, Pacific HiTech announced its name is changed to Turbolinux, Inc., coinciding its expansion of its North American operations.

In January 2000, Turbolinux received $57 million in investment from Compaq Computer, Dell Computer, Intel, and other companies.

The Millers were "terminated without cause" from Turbolinux in July 2000 after a disagreement with venture capitalists.

In October 2000, the company filed an S-1 with the Securities and Exchange Commission. The S-1 indicates that revenue was $2.932 million for the six months ended June 30, 2000.

After several rounds of layoffs, Turbolinux, Inc. and Software Research Associates, Inc. announced in 2002-08-20 the acquisition of Turbolinux, Inc. by Japan-based Software Research Associates, Inc. (SRA). The transferred company would retain a U.S. office, and became SRA's fully owned subsidiary. The acquisition was originally set to 100,000 shares (100% stake) for ¥100,000,000, but final cost was ¥150,000,000. In 2002-09-04, Turbolinux, Inc. announced renaming of TurboLinux Japan, K.K. to Turbolinux, Inc. that had taken place 3 days earlier. The US Turbolinux was renamed to Centerlex, and would continue the server provisioning software business based on the PowerCockpit product line, which SRA did not purchase. In 2003-02-25, Mountain View Data, Inc. announced the acquisition of PowerCockpit. The acquisition affected PowerCockpit versions 2.0 of above.

In 2004-03-15, livedoor Co., Ltd. and Software Research Associates, Inc. announced the complete acquisition of Turbolinux, Inc. by livedoor, with transaction set to close in 2004-05-06.

In 2005-08-05, Turbolinux, Inc. announced issuing 10,000 new shares of common stock to be available to apply between 2005-09-08 and 2005-09-12, and livedoor Co., Ltd. selling 9,000 shares of common stock to public in 2005-09-15. In 2005-09-07, Turbolinux, Inc. announced the offered stock price to be ¥100,000 per share.

Turbolinux completed an IPO on the Osaka Stock Exchange in September 2005 underwritten by Nikko Citigroup, Livedoor Securities Co. Ltd., and Mizuho Investors Securities Co., Ltd.

In 2009-05-01, TL HOLDINGS, Inc./TL Holdings Corporation (TLホールディングス株式会社) announced Turbolinux, Inc. would be run under holding company structure, with TurboLinux Inc., Turbo Solutions Co., Ltd., Zend Japan Ltd., and other overseas group enterprises being subsidiaries of TL HOLDINGS, Inc.

In 2009-05-18, TL HOLDINGS, Inc. announced relocation of Turbolinux, Inc., effective 2009-06-01.

In 2013-03-31, TL HOLDINGS, Inc. announced it would be renamed from TL HOLDINGS, Inc. (TLホールディングス株式会社) to TurbolinuxHD Corporation (ターボリナックスHD株式会社) in 2013-04-01.

In 2014-04-01, GEONEXT Corporation announced renaming from TurbolinuxHD Corporation (ターボリナックスHD株式会社) to GEONEXT Corporation (株式会社ジオネクスト) in the same day.

In 2019-04-01, FHT holdings Corp. announced renaming from GEONEXT Corporation to FHT holdings Corp. (株式会社FHTホールディングス) in the same day.

===== Dissolution =====
On 2019-10-15, FHT Holdings Corp. announced the dissolution of Turbolinux, Inc., with dissolution set at 2019-12-31, and liquidation ending at the end of March 2020. The remaining Turbolinux assets were to be sold to Turbo Systems Co., Ltd.

=== Subsidiaries ===
Sources:

- TurboLinux(Hongkong) Limited: TurboLinux's Hong Kong branch, founded in July 2000.
- TurboLinux Inc., Taiwan Branch: In 2000-09-??, TurboLinux, Inc. announced the opening of the company's Taiwan branch.
- TurboLinux(Korea)?: TurboLinux's Korean branch.
- Konekto, Inc. (コネクト株式会社): Established as in 2002-12-13 as Zend Open Source Systems Japan, Ltd. (ゼンド･オープンソースシステムズ株式会社), but the company's web site was established in 2001-11-02 by 10art-ni Corporation (株式会社テンアートニ). In 2002-12-25, Zend Open Source Systems Japan, Ltd. announced the transfer of Zend web site from 10art-ni Corporation to Zend Open Source Systems Japan, Ltd., followed by the beginning of Zend Open Source Systems Japan, Ltd.'s operation in 2003-01-06. In 2004-09-01, Zend Open Source Systems Japan, Ltd. announced the company was to be renamed to Open Source Japan Ltd. (オー プンソース・ジャパン株式会社) beginning 2004-09-13, with the Zend division split to Zend Japan Ltd. (ゼンド・ジャパン株式会社). In 2006-04-06, Turbolinux Inc. (Japan) announced the acquisition 90% stake (1710 shares) of Zend from Open Source Japan, Ltd. previously signed in 2006-03-30. In 2012-06-14, TL HOLDINGS, Inc. announced renaming the company to Konekto, Inc. (コネクト株式会社), effective 2012-07-01. In 2012-06-29, Konekto, Inc. announced the name change taking place 2 days later. The zend.co.jp domain used by Zend Japan Ltd. was transferred to iGUAZU Corporation (株式会社イグアス), subsidiary of JBCC Holdings Inc., with the web site set to operationaly in middle of January 2013.
- Shanghai Turbolinux Software Inc. (上海拓林思軟件有限公司): In 2008-03-12, Turbolinux, Inc. (Japan) announced establishing Shanghai Turbolinux Software Inc., effective in 2008-04-01.
- Turbo Labo (ターボラボ株式会社): In 2009-10-13, TL HOLDINGS, Inc. announced the establishment of Turbo Labo, with registration of the company set to began in 2009-10-16 and set to end in 2009-10-23, followed by public offer in December 2009. The company would be a joint venture where Turbolinux, Inc. owning 49% and iSOFT Infrastructure Software Co., Ltd. (普華基礎軟件股分有限公司) owning 51%.

==== Former subsidiaries ====
- Turbolinux, Inc. (ターボリナックス株式会社): Originally founded in Yoyogi district, Shibuya, Tokyo in April 1993 as Pacific HiTech, Inc.'s Utah branch. It was incorporated in 1995-07-13 in Tokyo, Japan as Pacific HiTech, KK. (パシフィック・ハイテック株式会社). In 1999-06-28, Pacific HiTech, Inc. announced renaming the subsidiary to TurboLinux Japan, K.K. (ターボリナックス ジャパン株式会社) in 1999-07-01, and relocation of headquarter in 1999-07-19. Following the sales of the Utah-based parent to Software Research Associates, Inc., it was merged into the Japanese branch. In 2002-09-04, Turbolinux, Inc. announced renaming of TurboLinux Japan, K.K. to Turbolinux, Inc. that had taken place 3 days earlier.
- Turbolinux Inc., China Branch/Turbolinux China Co., Ltd. (北京拓林思软件有限公司): Founded in 1999-04-23 as TurboLinux(Beijing) (北京TurboLinux软件公司). In July 1999, the company announced the name change to Turbolinux Inc., China Branch (TurboLinux（中国）). In 2005-05-08, the company announced its relocation to Xinhua Insurance Building in Beijing. In 2011-03-14, TL HOLDINGS, Inc. announced the sales of Turbolinux China Co., Ltd. shares owned by Turbolinux, Inc. as part of its plan to exit from China market. In 2015-12-08, GEONEXT Corporation announced it has started the sales of Turbolinux China Co., Ltd, which includes the 49% stake of the subsidiary, for $135,000 USD, to GreatDB (北京万里开源软件有限公司), the subsidiary's 51% stake holder during the announcement, with transaction set to close in 2016-03-20. In 2016-10-03, GEONEXT Corporation announced it has completed sales of Turbolinux China Co., Ltd. As of 2022, the company survived the former parent company's demise.
- Turbolinux India Private Limited (Turbolinux印度私营有限公司): In 2006-02-07, Turbolinux Inc. (Japan) announced establishing its India branch in Gurgaon with India Action Plan Company Limited (I.A.P.) (インディアアクションプラン株式会社), where Turbolinux would hold 55% share and IAP got 45%. The new company would be established in middle of March 2006 (2006-03-08/2006-02-28) and begin operation in 2006-04-01. In 2011-03-14, TL HOLDINGS, Inc. announced the sales of Turbolinux India Private Limited shares owned by Turbolinux, Inc. as part of its plan to exit from China market. In 2012-03-30, TL HOLDINGS, Inc. announced it has entered agreement to sell Turbolinux India Private Limited to India Action Plan Company Limited, which includes all 1,496,000 shares (55% stakes) of the subsidiary for 1000 yen per share.
- InfiniTalk Co., Ltd. (インフィニトーク株式会社): Originally called LASER5, an operating system division of Itsutsubashi Research Co., Ltd. (株式会社五橋研究所). In 1999-08-05, Itsutsubashi Research Co., Ltd. announced the establishment of LASER5 Co., Ltd. (レーザーファイブ株式会社) from Itsutsubashi's operating system division to a fully owned subsidiary a day before, and would begin operation in late August 1999. In 1999-08-30 (1999-08-31?), the separation of LASER5 from its parent was completed. In 1999-09-22, the subsidiary's own web site laser5.co.jp became operational. In 2006-06-08, Turbolinux, Inc. announced the complete acquisition of LASER5 Co., Ltd. (レーザーファイブ株式会社) via stock exchange, effective 2006-08-01, and expected to close in middle of 2006-08. In 2008-02-19, Turbolinux, Inc. announced renaming the subsidiary to Turbo Solutions K.K. (ターボ ソリューションズ株式会社), effective 2008-04-01. In 2008-04-01, Turbolinux, Inc. the subsidiary name change happening in the same day. In 2010-08-31, TL HOLDINGS, Inc. announced the sales of Turbo Solutions K.K. to Japan Multimedia Services Corporation/JMS Inc. (日本マルチメディアサービス株式会社（JMS）), effective 2010-09-01. As part of the sales, the former subsidiary was renamed to JMS Solutions (JMSソリューションズ株式会社). In 2011-03-01, JMS announced renaming JMS Solutions to InfiniTalk Co., Ltd. (インフィニトーク株式会社) on the same day, followed by InfiniTalk Co., Ltd.'s announcement 10 days later.
- CJ-LINX, Inc. (シージェイ・リンクス/CJ-LINX 株式会社): In 2009-03-25, Turbolinux, Inc. announced establishing CJ-LINX, Inc., to be operational in 2009-06. In 2011-03-14, TL HOLDINGS, Inc. announced the sales and liquidation of CJ-LINX, Inc. as part of its plan to exit from China market. In 2011-03-30, TL HOLDINGS, Inc. announced the sales of CJ-LINX, Inc. and CJ-LINX Finance to Mountain Piece? Promotion (株式会社マウンテンピースプロモーション), effective in 2011-03-31.
