= UserLinux =

Canceled Linux distribution for businesses

UserLinux was a project to create an operating system based on Debian, and targeted at business customers. The goal was to provide businesses with a freely available, high quality operating system accompanied by certifications, service, and support options.

The project was initiated by Bruce Perens in late 2003. Subsequent to 2005 and the major success of Ubuntu, a commercial Linux distribution based on Debian by Canonical Ltd. with much the same aims as UserLinux, the project lost steam. No software was shipped, and the project was ultimately abandoned.
