= Mountain Heights Academy =

Location
- 9067 S 1300 W Suite 204, West Jordan, Utah; United States; 40.592427°N 111.92059°W

Information
- Type: Public charter
- Established: 2009
- Authorizer: Utah State Charter School Board
- Director: DeLaina Tonks
- Teaching staff: 70.99 (FTE)
- Grades: 7-12
- Enrollment: 882 (2023–2024)
- Student to teacher ratio: 12.42
- Website: www.mountainheightsacademy.org

Mountain Heights Academy is a non-profit online charter high school in the United States. It opened in 2009 as Open High School of Utah and was renamed Mountain Heights Academy in 2013.

== History ==
Open High School of Utah was founded by David A. Wiley in 2009. It received its charter in 2007 and opened in 2009. In January 2013, the school was renamed Mountain Heights Academy.

== Teaching ==
Open High School of Utah existed as a virtual high school, with students attending online. Teachers curated Open Educational Resources aligned to the content to Utah state standards.

Creating Open Educational Resources was a fundamental aspect of the school's charter. On 7 September 2010, Open High School of Utah released ten semesters of high school curriculum under a CC-BY license.

== Performance ==
In 2016, Mountain Heights Academy received an "F" from the state. In 2019, it ranked at 411th place out of 950 Utah schools. It spent $819,000 on marketing.
