= Billy Boston =

GB international rugby league footballer (1934–2026)

Sir Billy Boston MBE
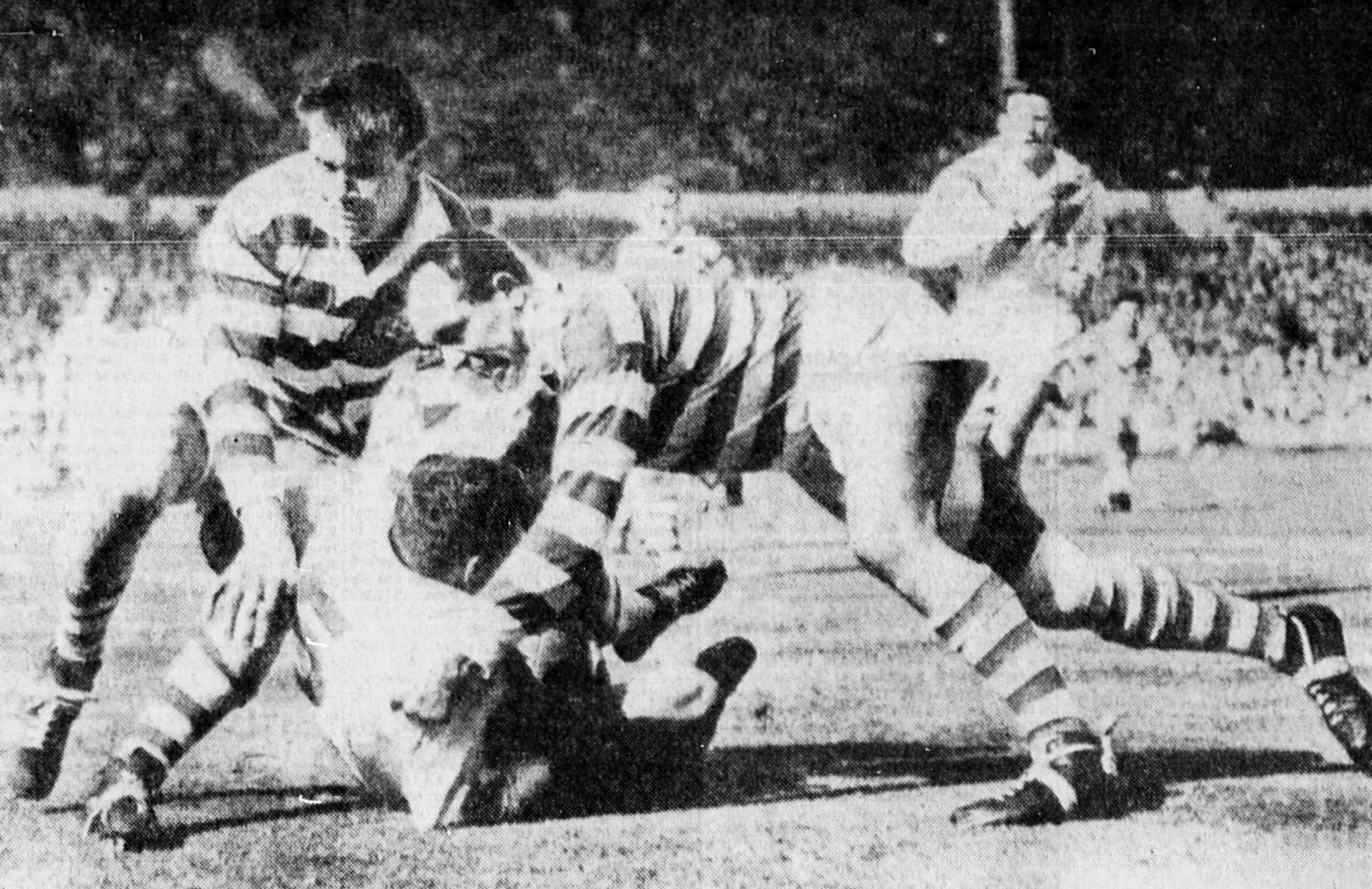
- Boston tackling Wakefield Trinity player Gert Coetzer during the 1962–63 Challenge Cup final

Personal information
- Full name: William John Boston
- Born: 6 August 1934 Butetown, Cardiff, Wales
- Died: 24 August 2026 (aged 92) Wigan, Greater Manchester, England

Playing information

Rugby union
Club
Years	Team	Pld	T	G	FG	P
1950	Neath	1	0	0	0	0
1952	Pontypridd	1	1	0	0	3
	Total	2	1	0	0	3

Rugby league
- Position: Wing, Centre
Club
Years	Team	Pld	T	G	FG	P
1953–68	Wigan	488	478	7	0	1448
1969–70	Blackpool Borough	11	5	0	0	15
	Total	499	483	7	0	1463
Representative
Years	Team	Pld	T	G	FG	P
1954–63	Great Britain	32 (Note: 31 tests and one non-test international)	25 (Note: 24 test tries)	0	0	75 (Note: 72 test points)
1954–1963	tour games	27	53	0	0	159
1955	Other Nationalities	2	5	0	0	15
Medals
Rugby league
Representing Great Britain
World Cup
Winner	1960 Great Britain

Sir William John Boston (6 August 1934 – 24 August 2026) was a Welsh professional rugby league footballer who played as a winger or centre.

Born and raised in Cardiff, Wales, Boston started his career as a rugby union player before joining Wigan in 1953. Regarded as one of the sport's greatest ever players, Boston scored 571 tries in his career, making him the second-highest try scorer in rugby league history.

Boston spent 15 years of his career at Wigan to which he is most well known, where he scored a club-record 478 tries in his 488 appearances for the club. He finished his career at Blackpool Borough before retiring in 1970. Internationally, he represented Great Britain in 31 Test matches, scoring 24 tries, and was part of the team that won the 1960 Rugby League World Cup.

He became one of the original inductees of three halls of fame, namely the Rugby Football League Hall of Fame in 1988, the Welsh Sports Hall of Fame in 1990 and the Wigan Warriors Hall of Fame in 1998, became an MBE, was knighted in June 2025, and had a stand named after him at both Central Park and the Wigan Athletic Stadium.

== Early life ==
Boston was born at Angelina Street, Butetown, Cardiff on 6 August 1934. He was the sixth of eleven children born to John Boston, a merchant seaman from Sierra Leone, and Nellie who was Cardiff-Irish.

== Rugby union career ==
Boston began his career in rugby union with the newly formed Cardiff Internationals Athletic Club (CIACS; pronounced "kayaks"). Boston also represented the Cardiff Schoolboys team in the late 1940s and went on to represent Wales in both the boys clubs' internationals and at Youth level. The young Boston was an integral part of the CIACs "invincible" season of 1951–52, where the team won all of their 32 games.

The young Boston also played Rugby Union for two famous Welsh clubs. Neath RFC gave him a trial in their match against Penarth RFC on 2 December 1950 before Pontypridd RFC selected him to play against Cheltenham on 26 December 1952, where he scored Pontypridd's only try in a 12–3 defeat. However, no offer came from his hometown club Cardiff RFC, with the club having passed on other black and mixed race players (like Johnny Freeman and Colin Dixon), it has since been suggested that the club had issues with racism.

Boston was called up for National Service with the Royal Signals at Catterick, North Yorkshire, which saw him scouted by a number of rugby league clubs. On 13 March 1953 Wigan chairman Joe Taylor and vice-chairman Billy Gore travelled to Boston's home in Cardiff and offered him £1,000 to sign for them. Although that was very large offer, Boston's mother rejected it on his behalf. A second offer of £1,500 was made in cash and the money was spread out on the table in five pound notes to show the family how much money it was. Boston later stated that he still did not want to sign the contract and his mother told him "Don't worry son, I'll get rid of them for you. I'll ask them for so much that they'll go home." Boston's mother told the delegation that Billy would only sign for £3,000, double the increased offer (equivalent to £72,800 in 2025). Within a minute the delegation agreed to the terms. Boston stated that he still did not want to sign, but his mother had given their word and Boston signed the contract. Boston later told one journalist that he cried after signing for Wigan as he knew his dreams of playing rugby union for Cardiff and Wales were over, because any player at the time who played rugby league, was banned from playing rugby union.

== Rugby league career ==
=== Club ===
==== Wigan ====
Boston made his first team debut for Wigan against Barrow in November 1953 scoring a try.

Boston played at centre in Wigan's 13–9 victory over Workington Town in the 1957–58 Challenge Cup Final at Wembley Stadium, London on Saturday 10 May 1958, in front of a crowd of 66,109.

Boston played stand-off in Wigan's 8–13 defeat by Oldham in the 1957–58 Lancashire Cup Final at Station Road, Swinton on Saturday 19 October 1957.

He played on the wing and scored two-tries in the 30–13 victory over Hull F.C. in the 1958–59 Challenge Cup Final at Wembley Stadium on Saturday 9 May 1959, in front of a crowd of 79,811.

Boston scored two tries in Wigan's 1959–60 Northern Rugby Football League season Championship final victory.

Boston played on the wing in the 20–16 victory over Hunslet in the 1964–65 Challenge Cup Final at Wembley Stadium on Saturday 8 May 1965, in front of a crowd of 89,016.

During his time at Wigan, Boston beat Johnny Ring's record of 368 tries, going on to score a record still held to this day of 478 for the club.

==== Blackpool ====
Towards the end of his career, Boston played for Blackpool Borough, making his final appearance in 1970. He scored a total of 571 tries in his career, making him the second highest all-time try scorer in the history of the game after Brian Bevan.

Boston became one of fewer than twenty-five Welshmen to have scored more than 1,000-points in their rugby league career.

=== International ===
Boston played 31 test matches for Great Britain and was the first player to score four tries in a game, against New Zealand. He was the first non-white player to be selected for a Lions tour, doing so on their tour Australia and New Zealand in 1954, on which he set a new record of 36 tries in 18 games. Boston also played in the 1962 tour, scoring a further 22 tries.

In 1955, Boston played his only game for Wales in a match against France 'B'.

He also represented Other Nationalities in the 1955–56 European Rugby League Championship. He also played at centre for them in a friendly, a 2–19 defeat by St. Helens at Knowsley Road, St. Helens on Wednesday 27 January 1965, to mark the switching-on of new floodlights.

== After retirement ==
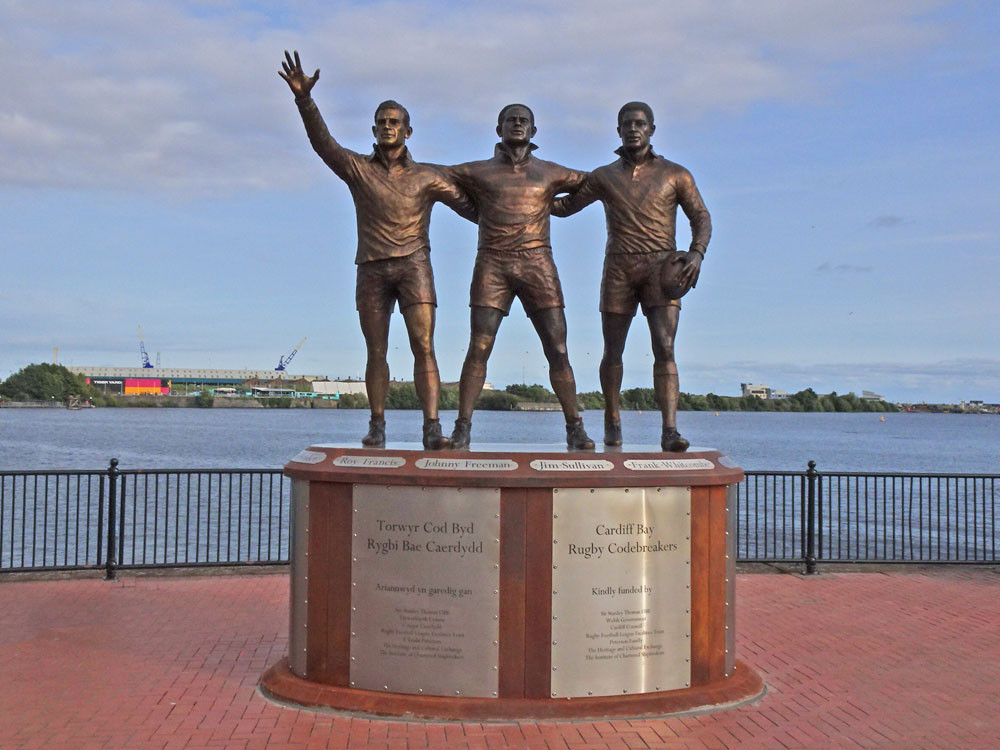
Boston (together with Gus Risman (left) and Clive Sullivan (right)) features in the Codebreakers Statue in Cardiff Bay

After finishing his playing career, he took over the running of the Griffin Hotel pub near Central Park.

Boston became one of the original inductees of three halls of fame: the Rugby Football League Hall of Fame in 1988, the Welsh Sports Hall of Fame in 1990 and the Wigan Warriors Hall of Fame in 1998.

He was appointed Member of the Order of the British Empire (MBE) in the 1996 Birthday Honours "for services to the community in Wigan, Greater Manchester."

The Billy Boston Stand at Central Park was named in his honour. Similarly, the East Stand at the DW Stadium was officially renamed after Billy Boston in 2009. The signage on the stand was changed to give his full title of 'Sir', after he was knighted.

In 2016, he was one of five players to feature on the rugby league statue at Wembley Stadium. A second statue of him was unveiled a month later in Wigan. Boston was one of the first two inductees of the Wales Rugby League Hall of Fame in 2016 (along with Gus Risman) and was awarded an honorary cap and heritage number (#382).

In July 2023, Boston was one of three Welsh rugby union and league players to be depicted in the Codebreakers Statue in Cardiff Bay, the other two being Gus Risman and Clive Sullivan.

On 10 June 2025, Boston became the first ever rugby league player to receive a knighthood for service to the sport, (Note: Glynn Hamilton West who played for Leeds in the early days of the Northern Union was knighted in 1916 for his services to the war effort. Billy Bulmer, another former England international was knighted in 1922 but his knighthood was "for public service". New Zealanders, Graham Lowe and Peter Leitch were knighted in 2013 and 2010 respectively but neither of these were directly for "services to rugby league".) as part of the 2025 Birthday Honours. Boston's investiture took place before the official announcement of the honour, due to uncertainty over Boston's health. The London Gazette notice announcing the knighthood, dated 14 June 2025, noted that it was backdated to 10 June 2025.

== Personal life ==
On 23 July 2026, Boston's wife Joan died at the age of 90. They had been married for 70 years.

== Illness and death ==
In August 2016, Boston revealed he had been diagnosed with vascular dementia. He died from complications of dementia on 24 August 2026, aged 92. His funeral took place at the Brick Community Stadium on 10 September.

=== Tributes ===
On the day of Boston's funeral, Wigan Metropolitan Borough Council renamed the town's Believe Square to the "Sir Billy Boston Square".

== Honours ==
=== Wigan Warriors ===
- First Division
  - Winners (1): 1959–60
- Challenge Cup
  - Winners (3): 1957–58, 1958–59, 1964–65
- Lancashire League
  - Winners (2): 1958–59, 1961–62
- Lancashire Cup
  - Winners (1): 1966–67

=== Great Britain ===
- World Cup
  - Winners (1): 1960
- Ashes Series
  - Winners (3): 1956–57, 1959–60, 1962

=== Other nationalities ===
- European Championship
  - Winners (1): 1955–56

=== Honours ===
- Order of the British Empire:
  - MBE: 1996 (services to the community of Wigan, Greater Manchester)
  - Knights Bachelor: 2025 (services to rugby league football) (Note: Several sources report this as a KBE although the official public record in the London Gazette states it to be a Knights Bachelor and photographs show Boston wearing the Knight Bachelor's insignia)
