= The Code-Breakers =

The Code-Breakers is a two-part (2x22') BBC World documentary on free open-source software (FOSS) and computer programming that started on BBC World TV on 10 May 2006. It investigates how poor countries are using FOSS applications for economic development, and includes stories and interviews from around the world. The film examines whether free and open-source software might be the bridge for the widening digital divide. A 40-minute version of The Code-Breakers is available for free download online as of 2014.

FOSS contains source code that can be used, copied, studied, modified, and redistributed without restriction. It has been around for over 20 years, but most PC owners are not aware that many internet search engines and computer applications run on FOSS.

It's not that FOSS has had bad press, it has had no press because there is no company that 'owns' it. But we found that in the computer industry and among the aficionados, it is well known and its virtues well understood.

— Robert Lamb, executive producer

Directed and filmed by Maximillian Jacobson-Gonzalez, the programs were filmed in nearly a dozen countries around the world, to see how the adoption of FOSS presents opportunities for industry and capacity development, software piracy reduction, and localization and customization for diverse cultural and development needs.

Stories from The Code-Breakers include computer and Internet access for school children in Africa, reaching the poor in Brazil, tortoise breeding programs in the Galapagos, connecting villages in southern Spain, and post-tsunami disaster management in Sri Lanka. The documentary also includes interviews from key figures around the world, such as Nicholas Negroponte, free software advocate Richard Stallman (filmed at the World Summit for the Information Society (WSIS) in Tunisia in 2005), and former Brazilian Minister of Culture and musician Gilberto Gil.

Representatives of Intel, IBM, Sun Microsystems and Microsoft all seem to agree that FOSS is a welcome presence in computer software. According to Jonathan Murray of Microsoft, "The Open Source community stimulates innovation in software, it's something that frankly we feel very good about and it's something that we absolutely see as being a partnership with Microsoft".
