= Progeny Linux Systems =

Defunct company which provided Linux platform technology

Progeny Linux Systems was a company which provided Linux platform technology. Their Platform Services technology supported both Debian and RPM-based distributions for Linux platforms. Progeny Linux Systems was based in Indianapolis. Ian Murdock, the founder of Debian, was the founder and chairman of the board. Its CTO was John H. Hartman, and Bruce Byfield was marketing and communications director.

Progeny created an operating system called Progeny Componentized Linux. Progeny eventually announced via a post to their mailing lists on 1 May 2007 that they were ceasing operations.

== Progeny Componentized Linux ==
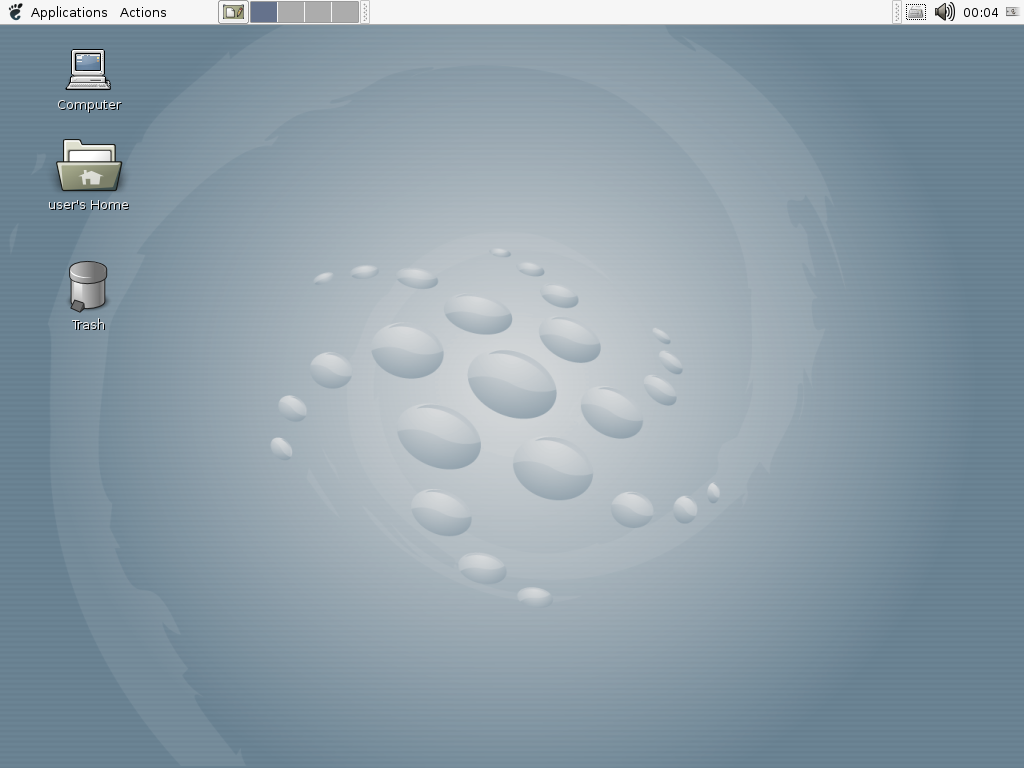
Progeny 3.0 – Developer Edition PR2

Progeny Componentized Linux, usually called Progeny Debian, is a defunct operating system. Progeny Debian was discontinued on 1 October 2001.

Progeny Debian was a commercial version of Debian. Its key selling point were the enhancements like a graphical installation, better hardware support, management tools and customer support.

== See also ==
- Corel Linux
